= Equestrian at the 1968 Summer Olympics – Individual eventing =

Equestrian at the Olympics

Individual eventing at the Games of the XIX Olympiad
- Venue: Campo Marte; Avándaro Golf Club; Estadio Olímpico Universitario
- Date: 18–21 October 1968
- Competitors: 49 from 13 nations

Medalists
1st place, gold medalist(s)		Jean-Jacques Guyon	France
2nd place, silver medalist(s)		Derek Allhusen	Great Britain
3rd place, bronze medalist(s)		Michael Page	United States

The individual eventing at the 1968 Summer Olympics took place between 18 and 21 October. The event was open to men and women. The competition included three segments: dressage, cross-country, and show-jumping. Penalties from each were summed to give a total score.

== Results ==
49 riders competed.

=== Standings after dressage ===
Rank	Rider	Horse	Nation	Time	Penalties
1	Alexander Evdokimov	Fat	Soviet Union	5.53	-48.00
2	German Gazumov	Fugas	Soviet Union	6.21	-49.50
3	Ulrich Vite	Hubertus	East Germany	6.23	-53.01
4	Pavel Deev	Paket	Soviet Union	6.06	-59.51
5	Michael Plumb	Plain Sailing	United States	6.17	-63.00
6	Carlos Moratorio	Hijo Manso	Argentina	6.21	-68.01
6	Jochen Mehrdorf	Lapislazuli	West Germany	6.06	-68.01
8	Reuben Jones	The Poacher	Great Britain	6.20	-68.51
9	Karl-Heinz Fuhrmann	Saturn	East Germany	6.19	-70.50
10	Juliet Jobling-Purser	Jenny	Ireland	5.41	-72.51
11	Jean-Jacques Guyon	Pitou	France	6.06	-73.01
12	Penelope Moreton	Loughlin	Ireland	6.28	-74.01
12	Horst Karsten	Adagio	West Germany	6.21	-74.01
14	Kevin Freeman	Chalan	United States	6.22	-77.01
15	Uwe Plank	Kranich	East Germany	6.27	-79.01
16	Jean Sarrazin	Joburg	France	5.50	-80.51
17	Mauro Checcoli	Surbeam	Italy	6.17	-82.01
18	André Le Goupil	Olivette	France	5.59	-83.01
19	Alessandro Argenton	Diambo de Nora	Italy	6.30	-83.51
20	Bill Roycroft	Warrathoola	Australia	6.18	-84.00
21	Derek Allhusen	Lochinvar	Great Britain	5.58	-85.01
22	Svetozar Gluchkov	Balerina	Soviet Union	5.53	-86.51
22	Jane Holderness-Roddam	Our Nobby	Great Britain	6.13	-86.51
24	Jean-Louis Martin	Quel Feu	France	6.08	-87.51
25	Roberto Pistarini	Warti	Argentina	6.21	-90.00
26	Jorge Bedoya	Naranjo	Argentina	7.00	-91.50
27	Ludwig Gössing	Arved	West Germany	5.59	-94.01
28	Robin Hahn	Taffy	Canada	6.10	-97.01
28	Richard Meade	Cornishman V	Great Britain	5.46	-97.01
28	Thomas Brennan	March Hawk	Ireland	6.01	-97.01
31	Evaristo Avalos	Ludmilla II	Mexico	6.53	-98.01
32	Allan Ehrlick	The Nomad	Canada	6.08	-99.00
33	Helmut Hartmann	Ingwer	East Germany	6.39	-101.01
34	James C. Wofford	Kilkenny	United States	6.24	-101.51
35	Klaus Wagner	Abdulla	West Germany	6.39	-102.00
36	Barry Sonshine	Durlas Eile	Canada	6.12	-103.01
37	Wayne Roycroft	Zhivago	Australia	6.31	-103.50
38	Norman Elder	Questionnaire	Canada	5.49	-106.01
38	Paolo Angioni	King	Italy	6.37	-106.01
40	Michael Page	Foster	United States	6.25	-107.51
41	José Eugenio Acosta	Oligarca	Argentina	6.37	-110.01
42	Giuseppe Ravano	Lord Jim	Italy	6.47	-111.00
43	Ramón Mejía	Centinela	Mexico	7.10	-112.50
44	Brien Cobcroft	Depeche	Australia	6.39	-115.01
45	Ernesto Del Castillo	Codicioso	Mexico	7.09	-117.00
46	James Scanlon	The Furtive	Australia	6.00	-122.01
47	Diana Willson	Chianti Rosso	Ireland	5.59	-122.51
48	Mikio Chiba	Josephine	Japan	7.05	-128.01
–	Eduardo Higareda	Samuray Azteca	Mexico	DSQ	

=== Standings after cross-country ===
Rank	Rider	Horse	Nation	Dressage	Cross-country			Total
Rank	Rider	Horse	Nation	Dressage	Stage B	Stage D	Total	Total
1	Jean-Jacques Guyon	Pitou	France	-73.01	27.20	17.20	44.40	-28.61
2	James C. Wofford	Kilkenny	United States	-101.51	37.60	33.60	71.20	-30.31
3	Pavel Deev	Paket	Soviet Union	-59.51	27.20	-5.60	21.60	-37.91
4	Derek Allhusen	Lochinvar	Great Britain	-85.01	35.20	9.20	44.40	-40.61
5	Richard Meade	Cornishman V	Great Britain	-97.01	37.60	17.20	54.80	-42.21
6	Michael Page	Foster	United States	-107.51	28.80	30.40	59.20	-48.31
7	Reuben Jones	The Poacher	Great Britain	-68.51	11.20	-6.80	4.40	-64.11
8	German Gazumov	Fugas	Soviet Union	-49.50	29.60	-56.80	-27.20	-76.70
9	Juliet Jobling-Purser	Jenny	Ireland	-72.51	37.60	-43.20	-5.60	-78.11
10	Wayne Roycroft	Zhivago	Australia	-103.50	23.20	-2.00	21.20	-82.30
11	Robin Hahn	Taffy	Canada	-97.01	16.00	-4.40	11.60	-85.41
12	Brien Cobcroft	Depeche	Australia	-115.01	19.20	2.80	22.00	-93.01
13	André Le Goupil	Olivette	France	-83.01	18.40	-32.40	-14.00	-97.01
14	Horst Karsten	Adagio	West Germany	-74.01	20.00	-43.20	-23.20	-97.21
15	Michael Plumb	Plain Sailing	United States	-63.00	29.60	-83.60	-54.00	-117.00
16	Bill Roycroft	Warrathoola	Australia	-84.00	24.00	-64.80	-40.80	-124.80
17	Ernesto Del Castillo	Codicioso	Mexico	-117.00	36.00	-55.60	-19.60	-136.60
18	Jane Holderness-Roddam	Our Nobby	Great Britain	-86.51	37.60	-89.60	-52.00	-138.51
19	James Scanlon	The Furtive	Australia	-122.01	23.20	-42.40	-19.20	-141.21
20	Alessandro Argenton	Diambo de Nora	Italy	-83.51	36.00	-112.40	-76.40	-159.91
21	Alexander Evdokimov	Fat	Soviet Union	-48.00	2.40	-120.00	-117.60	-165.60
22	Ramón Mejía	Centinela	Mexico	-112.50	17.60	-78.00	-60.40	-172.90
23	Karl-Heinz Fuhrmann	Saturn	East Germany	-70.50	-3.20	-100.80	-104.00	-174.50
24	Jochen Mehrdorf	Lapislazuli	West Germany	-68.01	32.00	-140.40	-108.40	-176.41
25	Giuseppe Ravano	Lord Jim	Italy	-111.00	18.40	-94.00	-75.60	-186.60
26	Paolo Angioni	King	Italy	-106.01	37.60	-121.60	-84.00	-190.01
27	Klaus Wagner	Abdulla	West Germany	-102.00	28.00	-127.60	-99.60	-201.60
28	Uwe Plank	Kranich	East Germany	-79.01	-55.20	-76.80	-132.00	-211.01
29	Ludwig Gössing	Arved	West Germany	-94.01	3.20	-127.20	-124.00	-218.01
30	Helmut Hartmann	Ingwer	East Germany	-101.01	27.20	-144.40	-117.20	-218.21
31	Diana Willson	Chianti Rosso	Ireland	-122.51	8.00	-114.40	-106.40	-228.91
32	Roberto Pistarini	Warti	Argentina	-90.00	37.60	-187.60	-150.00	-240.00
33	Evaristo Avalos	Ludmilla II	Mexico	-98.01	4.80	-153.60	-148.80	-246.81
34	José Eugenio Acosta	Oligarca	Argentina	-110.01	34.40	-189.60	-155.20	-265.21
35	Norman Elder	Questionnaire	Canada	-106.01	-47.20	-156.00	-203.20	-309.21
36	Barry Sonshine	Durlas Eile	Canada	-103.01	27.20	-274.00	-246.80	-349.81
37	Jean Sarrazin	Joburg	France	-80.51	37.60	-316.80	-279.20	-359.71
38	Carlos Moratorio	Hijo Manso	Argentina	-68.01	21.60	-315.60	-294.00	-362.01
39	Allan Ehrlick	The Nomad	Canada	-99.00	-60.00	-231.60	-291.60	-390.60
–	Ulrich Vite	Hubertus	East Germany	-53.01	23.20	DSQ		
–	Penelope Moreton	Loughlin	Ireland	-74.01	37.60	DSQ		
–	Kevin Freeman	Chalan	United States	-77.01	37.60	DSQ		
–	Mauro Checcoli	Surbeam	Italy	-82.01	23.20	DSQ		
–	Svetozar Gluchkov	Balerina	Soviet Union	-86.51	37.60	DSQ		
–	Jean-Louis Martin	Quel Feu	France	-87.51	36.80	DSQ		
–	Jorge Bedoya	Naranjo	Argentina	-91.50	23.20	DSQ		
–	Thomas Brennan	March Hawk	Ireland	-97.01	28.80	DSQ		
–	Mikio Chiba	Josephine	Japan	-128.01	37.60	DSQ		
–	Eduardo Higareda	Samuray Azteca	Mexico	DSQ	Eliminated			

=== Final standings after jumping ===
Rank	Rider	Horse	Nation	Dressage	Cross-country	Jumping			Total
Rank	Rider	Horse	Nation	Dressage	Cross-country	Obstacles	Time	Total	Total
1st place, gold medalist(s)	Jean-Jacques Guyon	Pitou	France	-73.01	44.40	-10	-0.25	-10.25	-38.86
2nd place, silver medalist(s)	Derek Allhusen	Lochinvar	Great Britain	-85.01	44.40	0	-1.00	-1.00	-41.61
3rd place, bronze medalist(s)	Michael Page	Foster	United States	-107.51	59.20	0	-4.00	-4.00	-52.31
4	Richard Meade	Cornishman V	Great Britain	-97.01	54.80	-20	-2.25	-22.25	-64.46
5	Reuben Jones	The Poacher	Great Britain	-68.51	4.40	0	-5.75	-5.75	-69.86
6	James C. Wofford	Kilkenny	United States	-101.51	71.20	-40	-3.75	-43.75	-74.06
7	Juliet Jobling-Purser	Jenny	Ireland	-72.51	-5.60	0	-1.00	-1.00	-79.11
8	Wayne Roycroft	Zhivago	Australia	-103.50	21.20	-10	-2.75	-12.75	-95.05
9	Robin Hahn	Taffy	Canada	-97.01	11.60	-10	0.00	-10.00	-95.41
10	German Gazumov	Fugas	Soviet Union	-49.50	-27.20	-10	-9.00	-19.00	-95.70
11	Horst Karsten	Adagio	West Germany	-74.01	-23.20	0	-5.75	-5.75	-102.96
12	André le Goupil	Olivette	France	-83.01	-14.00	-10	-0.25	-10.25	-107.26
13	Brien Cobcroft	Depeche	Australia	-115.01	22.00	-10	-5.75	-15.75	-108.76
14	Michael Plumb	Plain Sailing	United States	-63.00	-54.00	0	-2.50	-2.50	-119.50
15	Bill Roycroft	Warrathoola	Australia	-84.00	-40.80	0	-2.75	-2.75	-127.55
16	Alessandro Argenton	Diambo de Nora	Italy	-83.51	-76.40	0	-0.50	-0.50	-160.41
17	James Scanlon	The Furtive	Australia	-122.01	-19.20	-20	-1.00	-21.00	-162.21
18	Jane Holderness-Roddam	Our Nobby	Great Britain	-86.51	-52.00	-20	-5.50	-25.50	-164.01
19	Ernesto del Castillo	Codicioso	Mexico	-117.00	-19.60	-30	-4.00	-34.00	-170.60
20	Ramón Mejía	Centinela	Mexico	-112.50	-60.40	-10	0.00	-10.00	-182.90
21	Aleksandr Yevdokimov	Fat	Soviet Union	-48.00	-117.60	-20	-7.00	-27.00	-192.60
22	Jochen Mehrdorf	Lapislazuli	West Germany	-68.01	-108.40	-20	-3.00	-23.00	-199.41
23	Paolo Angioni	King	Italy	-106.01	-84.00	-20	0.00	-20.00	-210.01
24	Klaus Wagner	Abdulla	West Germany	-102.00	-99.60	-10	-4.25	-14.25	-215.85
25	Karl-Heinz Fuhrmann	Saturn	East Germany	-70.50	-104.00	-40	-3.75	-43.75	-218.25
26	Diana Wilson	Chianti Rosso	Ireland	-122.51	-106.40	0	0.00	0.00	-228.91
27	Uwe Plank	Kranich	East Germany	-79.01	-132.00	-20	0.00	-20.00	-231.01
28	Helmut Hartmann	Ingwer	East Germany	-101.01	-117.20	-20	-3.25	-23.25	-241.46
29	José Eugenio Acosta	Oligarca	Argentina	-110.01	-155.20	-10	-2.75	-12.75	-277.96
30	Evaristo Avalos	Ludmilla II	Mexico	-98.01	-148.80	-30	-1.25	-31.25	-278.06
31	Norman Elder	Questionnaire	Canada	-106.01	-203.20	-20	-3.25	-23.25	-332.46
32	Jean Sarrazin	Joburg	France	-80.51	-279.20	0	0.00	0.00	-359.71
33	Barry Sonshine	Durlas Eile	Canada	-103.01	-246.80	-10	0.00	-10.00	-359.81
34	Carlos Moratorio	Hijo Manso	Argentina	-68.01	-294.00	0	-1.25	-1.25	-363.26
35	Alan Ehrlick	The Nomad	Canada	-99.00	-291.60	-10	0.00	-10.00	-400.60
–	Pavel Deev	Paket	Soviet Union	-59.51	21.60	DSQ			Eliminated
–	Giuseppe Ravano	Lord Jim	Italy	-111.00	-75.60	DSQ			Eliminated
–	Ludwig Gössing	Arved	West Germany	-94.01	-124.00	DSQ			Eliminated
–	Roberto Pistarini	Warti	Argentina	-90.00	-150.00	DSQ			Eliminated
–	Ulrich Vite	Hubertus	East Germany	-53.01	DSQ	Eliminated			
–	Penelope Moreton	Loughlin	Ireland	-74.01	DSQ	Eliminated			
–	Kevin Freeman	Chalan	United States	-77.01	DSQ	Eliminated			
–	Mauro Checcoli	Surbeam	Italy	-82.01	DSQ	Eliminated			
–	Svetozar Glushkov	Balerina	Soviet Union	-86.51	DSQ	Eliminated			
–	Jean-Louis Martin	Quel Feu	France	-87.51	DSQ	Eliminated			
–	Jorge Bedoya	Naranjo	Argentina	-91.50	DSQ	Eliminated			
–	Thomas Brennan	March Hawk	Ireland	-97.01	DSQ	Eliminated			
–	Mikio Chiba	Josephine	Japan	-128.01	DSQ	Eliminated			
–	Eduardo Higareda	Samuray Azteca	Mexico	DSQ	Eliminated				
