= Equestrian at the 1968 Summer Olympics – Team eventing =

Equestrian at the Olympics

Team eventing at the Games of the XIX Olympiad
- Venue: Campo Marte; Avándaro Golf Club; Estadio Olímpico Universitario
- Date: 18–21 October 1968
- Competitors: 48 from 12 nations

Medalists
1st place, gold medalist(s)		Derek Allhusen; Richard Meade; Reuben Jones	Great Britain
2nd place, silver medalist(s)		Michael Page; James C. Wofford; Michael Plumb	United States
3rd place, bronze medalist(s)		Wayne Roycroft; Brien Cobcroft; Bill Roycroft	Australia

The team eventing at the 1968 Summer Olympics took place between 18 and 21 October. The event was open to men and women.

== Competition format ==
The competition included three segments: dressage, cross-country, and show-jumping. Penalties from each were summed to give a total score. Teams consisted of four horse and rider pairs, though only the best three scores counted for the team total. If a team had fewer than three pairs finish, the team received no score.

== Results ==
49 riders competed.

=== Standings after dressage ===
Rank	Nation	Individual results				Total
Rank	Nation	Rider	Horse	Time	Penalties	Total
1	Soviet Union	Alexander Evdokimov	Fat	5.53	-48.00	157.01
1	Soviet Union	German Gazumov	Fugas	6.21	-49.50	157.01
1	Soviet Union	Pavel Deev	Paket	6.06	-59.51	157.01
1	Soviet Union	Svetozar Gluchkov	Balerina	5.53	~~-86.51~~	157.01
2	East Germany	Ulrich Vite	Hubertus	6.23	-53.01	202.52
2	East Germany	Karl-Heinz Fuhrmann	Saturn	6.19	-70.50	202.52
2	East Germany	Uwe Plank	Kranich	6.27	-79.01	202.52
2	East Germany	Helmut Hartmann	Ingwer	6.39	~~-101.01~~	202.52
3	West Germany	Jochen Mehrdorf	Lapislazuli	6.06	-68.01	236.03
3	West Germany	Horst Karsten	Adagio	6.21	-74.01	236.03
3	West Germany	Ludwig Gössing	Arved	5.59	-94.01	236.03
3	West Germany	Klaus Wagner	Abdulla	6.39	~~-102.00~~	236.03
4	France	Jean-Jacques Guyon	Pitou	6.06	-73.01	236.53
4	France	Jean Sarrazin	Joburg	5.50	-80.51	236.53
4	France	André Le Goupil	Olivette	5.59	-83.01	236.53
4	France	Jean-Louis Martin	Quel Feu	6.08	~~-87.51~~	236.53
5	Great Britain	Reuben Jones	The Poacher	6.20	-68.51	240.03
5	Great Britain	Derek Allhusen	Lochinvar	5.58	-85.01	240.03
5	Great Britain	Jane Holderness-Roddam	Our Nobby	6.13	-86.51	240.03
5	Great Britain	Richard Meade	Cornishman V	5.46	~~-97.01~~	240.03
6	United States	Michael Plumb	Plain Sailing	6.17	-63.00	241.52
6	United States	Kevin Freeman	Chalan	6.22	-77.01	241.52
6	United States	James C. Wofford	Kilkenny	6.24	-101.51	241.52
6	United States	Michael Page	Foster	6.25	~~-107.51~~	241.52
7	Ireland	Juliet Jobling-Purser	Jenny	5.41	-72.51	243.53
7	Ireland	Penelope Moreton	Loughlin	6.28	-74.01	243.53
7	Ireland	Thomas Brennan	March Hawk	6.01	-97.01	243.53
7	Ireland	Diana Willson	Chianti Rosso	5.59	~~-122.51~~	243.53
8	Argentina	Carlos Moratorio	Hijo Manso	6.21	-68.01	249.51
8	Argentina	Roberto Pistarini	Warti	6.21	-90.00	249.51
8	Argentina	Jorge Bedoya	Naranjo	7.00	-91.50	249.51
8	Argentina	José Eugenio Acosta	Oligarca	6.37	~~-110.01~~	249.51
9	Italy	Mauro Checcoli	Surbeam	6.17	-82.01	271.53
9	Italy	Alessandro Argenton	Diambo de Nora	6.30	-83.51	271.53
9	Italy	Paolo Angioni	King	6.37	-106.01	271.53
9	Italy	Giuseppe Ravano	Lord Jim	6.47	~~-111.00~~	271.53
10	Canada	Robin Hahn	Taffy	6.10	-97.01	299.02
10	Canada	Allan Ehrlick	The Nomad	6.08	-99.00	299.02
10	Canada	Barry Sonshine	Durlas Eile	6.12	-103.01	299.02
10	Canada	Norman Elder	Questionnaire	5.49	~~-106.01~~	299.02
11	Australia	Bill Roycroft	Warrathoola	6.18	-84.00	302.51
11	Australia	Wayne Roycroft	Zhivago	6.31	-103.50	302.51
11	Australia	Brien Cobcroft	Depeche	6.39	-115.01	302.51
11	Australia	James Scanlon	The Furtive	6.00	~~-122.01~~	302.51
12	Mexico	Evaristo Avalos	Ludmilla II	6.53	-98.01	327.51
12	Mexico	Ramón Mejía	Centinela	7.10	-112.50	327.51
12	Mexico	Ernesto Del Castillo	Codicioso	7.09	-117.00	327.51
12	Mexico	Eduardo Higareda	Samuray Azteca	DSQ		327.51

=== Standings after cross-country ===
Rank	Nation	Individual results					Total
Rank	Nation	Rider	Horse	Dressage	Cross-country	Total	Total
1	Great Britain	Derek Allhusen	Lochinvar	-85.01	44.40	-40.61	-146.93
1	Great Britain	Richard Meade	Cornishman V	-97.01	54.80	-42.21	-146.93
1	Great Britain	Reuben Jones	The Poacher	-68.51	4.40	-64.11	-146.93
1	Great Britain	Jane Holderness-Roddam	Our Nobby	-86.51	-52.00	~~-138.51~~	-146.93
2	United States	James C. Wofford	Kilkenny	-101.51	71.20	-30.31	-195.62
2	United States	Michael Page	Foster	-107.51	59.20	-48.31	-195.62
2	United States	Michael Plumb	Plain Sailing	-63.00	-54.00	-117.00	-195.62
2	United States	Kevin Freeman	Chalan	-77.01	DSQ		-195.62
3	Soviet Union	Pavel Deev	Paket	-59.51	21.60	-37.91	-280.21
3	Soviet Union	German Gazumov	Fugas	-49.50	-27.20	-76.70	-280.21
3	Soviet Union	Alexander Evdokimov	Fat	-48.00	-117.60	-165.60	-280.21
3	Soviet Union	Svetozar Gluchkov	Balerina	-86.51	DSQ		-280.21
4	Australia	Wayne Roycroft	Zhivago	-103.50	21.20	-82.30	-300.11
4	Australia	Brien Cobcroft	Depeche	-115.01	22.00	-93.01	-300.11
4	Australia	Bill Roycroft	Warrathoola	-84.00	-40.80	-124.80	-300.11
4	Australia	James Scanlon	The Furtive	-122.01	-19.20	~~-141.21~~	-300.11
5	West Germany	Horst Karsten	Adagio	-74.01	-23.20	-97.21	-475.22
5	West Germany	Jochen Mehrdorf	Lapislazuli	-68.01	-108.40	-176.41	-475.22
5	West Germany	Klaus Wagner	Abdulla	-102.00	-99.60	-201.60	-475.22
5	West Germany	Ludwig Gössing	Arved	-94.01	-124.00	~~-218.01~~	-475.22
6	France	Jean-Jacques Guyon	Pitou	-73.01	44.40	-28.61	-485.33
6	France	André Le Goupil	Olivette	-83.01	-14.00	-97.01	-485.33
6	France	Jean Sarrazin	Joburg	-80.51	-279.20	-359.71	-485.33
6	France	Jean-Louis Martin	Quel Feu	-87.51	DSQ		-485.33
7	Italy	Alessandro Argenton	Diambo de Nora	-83.51	-76.40	-159.91	-536.52
7	Italy	Giuseppe Ravano	Lord Jim	-111.00	-75.60	-186.60	-536.52
7	Italy	Paolo Angioni	King	-106.01	-84.00	-190.01	-536.52
7	Italy	Mauro Checcoli	Surbeam	-82.01	DSQ		-536.52
8	Mexico	Ernesto Del Castillo	Codicioso	-117.00	-19.60	-136.60	-556.31
8	Mexico	Ramón Mejía	Centinela	-112.50	-60.40	-172.90	-556.31
8	Mexico	Evaristo Avalos	Ludmilla II	-98.01	-148.80	-246.81	-556.31
8	Mexico	Eduardo Higareda	Samuray Azteca	DSQ	Eliminated		-556.31
9	East Germany	Karl-Heinz Fuhrmann	Saturn	-70.50	-104.00	-174.50	-603.72
9	East Germany	Uwe Plank	Kranich	-79.01	-132.00	-211.01	-603.72
9	East Germany	Helmut Hartmann	Ingwer	-101.01	-117.20	-218.21	-603.72
9	East Germany	Ulrich Vite	Hubertus	-53.01	DSQ		-603.72
10	Canada	Robin Hahn	Taffy	-97.01	11.60	-85.41	-744.43
10	Canada	Norman Elder	Questionnaire	-106.01	-203.20	-309.21	-744.43
10	Canada	Barry Sonshine	Durlas Eile	-103.01	-246.80	-349.81	-744.43
10	Canada	Allan Ehrlick	The Nomad	-99.00	-291.60	~~-390.60~~	-744.43
11	Argentina	Roberto Pistarini	Warti	-90.00	-150.00	-240.00	-867.22
11	Argentina	José Eugenio Acosta	Oligarca	-110.01	-155.20	-265.21	-867.22
11	Argentina	Carlos Moratorio	Hijo Manso	-68.01	-294.00	-362.01	-867.22
11	Argentina	Jorge Bedoya	Naranjo	-91.50	DSQ		-867.22
–	Ireland	Juliet Jobling-Purser	Jenny	-72.51	-5.60	-78.11	Eliminated
–	Ireland	Diana Willson	Chianti Rosso	-122.51	-106.40	-228.91	Eliminated
–	Ireland	Penelope Moreton	Loughlin	-74.01	DSQ		Eliminated
–	Ireland	Thomas Brennan	March Hawk	-97.01	DSQ		Eliminated

=== Final standings after jumping ===
Rank	Nation	Individual results						Total
Rank	Nation	Rider	Horse	Dressage	Cross-country	Jumping	Total	Total
1st place, gold medalist(s)	Great Britain	Derek Allhusen	Lochinvar	-85.01	44.40	-1.00	-41.61	-175.93
1st place, gold medalist(s)	Great Britain	Richard Meade	Cornishman V	-97.01	54.80	-22.25	-64.46	-175.93
1st place, gold medalist(s)	Great Britain	Reuben Jones	The Poacher	-68.51	4.40	-5.75	-69.86	-175.93
1st place, gold medalist(s)	Great Britain	Jane Holderness-Roddam	Our Nobby	-86.51	-52.00	-25.50	~~-164.01~~	-175.93
2nd place, silver medalist(s)	United States	Michael Page	Foster	-107.51	59.20	-4.00	-52.31	-245.87
2nd place, silver medalist(s)	United States	James C. Wofford	Kilkenny	-101.51	71.20	-43.75	-74.06	-245.87
2nd place, silver medalist(s)	United States	Michael Plumb	Plain Sailing	-63.00	-54.00	-2.50	-119.50	-245.87
2nd place, silver medalist(s)	United States	Kevin Freeman	Chalan	-77.01	DSQ	Eliminated		-245.87
3rd place, bronze medalist(s)	Australia	Wayne Roycroft	Zhivago	-103.50	21.20	-12.75	-94.95	-331.26
3rd place, bronze medalist(s)	Australia	Brien Cobcroft	Depeche	-115.01	22.00	-15.75	-108.76	-331.26
3rd place, bronze medalist(s)	Australia	Bill Roycroft	Warrathoola	-84.00	-40.80	-2.75	-127.55	-331.26
3rd place, bronze medalist(s)	Australia	James Scanlon	The Furtive	-122.01	-19.20	-21.00	~~-162.21~~	-331.26
4	France	Jean-Jacques Guyon	Pitou	-73.01	44.40	-10.25	-38.86	-505.83
4	France	André Le Goupil	Olivette	-83.01	-14.00	-10.25	-107.26	-505.83
4	France	Jean Sarrazin	Joburg	-80.51	-279.20	0.00	-359.71	-505.83
4	France	Jean-Louis Martin	Quel Feu	-87.51	DSQ	Eliminated		-505.83
5	West Germany	Horst Karsten	Adagio	-74.01	-23.20	-5.75	-102.96	-518.22
5	West Germany	Jochen Mehrdorf	Lapislazuli	-68.01	-108.40	-23.00	-199.41	-518.22
5	West Germany	Klaus Wagner	Abdulla	-102.00	-99.60	-14.25	-215.85	-518.22
5	West Germany	Ludwig Gössing	Arved	-94.01	-124.00	DSQ		-518.22
6	Mexico	Ernesto Del Castillo	Codicioso	-117.00	-19.60	-34.00	-170.60	-631.56
6	Mexico	Ramón Mejía	Centinela	-112.50	-60.40	-10.00	-182.90	-631.56
6	Mexico	Evaristo Avalos	Ludmilla II	-98.01	-148.80	-31.25	-278.06	-631.56
6	Mexico	Eduardo Higareda	Samuray Azteca	DSQ	Eliminated			-631.56
7	East Germany	Karl-Heinz Fuhrmann	Saturn	-70.50	-104.00	-43.75	-218.25	-690.72
7	East Germany	Uwe Plank	Kranich	-79.01	-132.00	-20.00	-231.01	-690.72
7	East Germany	Helmut Hartmann	Ingwer	-101.01	-117.20	-23.25	-241.46	-690.72
7	East Germany	Ulrich Vite	Hubertus	-53.01	DSQ	Eliminated		-690.72
8	Canada	Robin Hahn	Taffy	-97.01	11.60	-10.00	-95.41	-787.68
8	Canada	Norman Elder	Questionnaire	-106.01	-203.20	-23.25	-332.46	-787.68
8	Canada	Barry Sonshine	Durlas Eile	-103.01	-246.80	-10.00	-359.81	-787.68
8	Canada	Allan Ehrlick	The Nomad	-99.00	-291.60	-10.00	-400.60	-787.68
–	Soviet Union	German Gazumov	Fugas	-49.50	-27.20	-19.00	-95.70	Eliminated
–	Soviet Union	Alexander Evdokimov	Fat	-48.00	-117.60	-27.00	-192.60	Eliminated
–	Soviet Union	Pavel Deev	Paket	-59.51	21.60	DSQ		Eliminated
–	Soviet Union	Svetozar Gluchkov	Balerina	-86.51	DSQ	Eliminated		Eliminated
–	Italy	Alessandro Argenton	Diambo de Nora	-83.51	-76.40	-0.50	-160.41	Eliminated
–	Italy	Paolo Angioni	King	-106.01	-84.00	-20.00	-210.01	Eliminated
–	Italy	Giuseppe Ravano	Lord Jim	-111.00	-75.60	DSQ		Eliminated
–	Italy	Mauro Checcoli	Surbeam	-82.01	DSQ	Eliminated		Eliminated
–	Argentina	José Eugenio Acosta	Oligarca	-110.01	-155.20	-12.75	-277.96	Eliminated
–	Argentina	Carlos Moratorio	Hijo Manso	-68.01	-294.00	-1.25	-363.26	Eliminated
–	Argentina	Roberto Pistarini	Warti	-90.00	-150.00	DSQ		Eliminated
–	Argentina	Jorge Bedoya	Naranjo	-91.50	DSQ	Eliminated		Eliminated
–	Ireland	Juliet Jobling-Purser	Jenny	-72.51	-5.60	-1.00	-79.11	Eliminated
–	Ireland	Diana Willson	Chianti Rosso	-122.51	-106.40	0.00	-228.91	Eliminated
–	Ireland	Penelope Moreton	Loughlin	-74.01	DSQ	Eliminated		Eliminated
–	Ireland	Thomas Brennan	March Hawk	-97.01	DSQ	Eliminated		Eliminated
