= Equestrian at the 1964 Summer Olympics – Individual eventing =

Individual eventing at the Games of the XVIII Olympiad
- Venue: Karuizawa Equestrian Venue
- Date: 16–19 October 1964
- Competitors: 48 from 12 nations
- Teams: 12

Medalists
1st place, gold medalist(s)		Mauro Checcoli	Italy
2nd place, silver medalist(s)		Carlos Moratorio	Argentina
3rd place, bronze medalist(s)		Fritz Ligges	United Team of Germany

The individual eventing was an equestrian event held as part of the Equestrian at the 1964 Summer Olympics programme. The event was held from 16–19 October 1964.

== Results ==
There was a dressage test, an endurance test, and a jumping test. The penalties accrued in each were summed to give a final score. It was possible to earn negative penalties in the endurance test; thus, some pairs finished with a negative score.

	Mauro Checcoli on Surbean (ITA)	54.00	-118.4	0.00	-64.40
	Carlos Moratorio on Chalan (ARG)	42.00	-98.4	0.00	-56.40
	Fritz Ligges on Donkosak (EUA)	32.00	-91.2	10.00	-49.20
4.	Michael Page on The Grasshopper (USA)	43.00	-90.4	0.00	-47.40
5.	Anthony Cameron on Black Salmon (IRL)	70.67	-117.2	0.00	-46.53
6.	Horst Karsten on Condora (EUA)	49.00	-95.6	10.00	-36.60
7.	Bill Roycroft on El Dorado (AUS)	65.00	-97.2	0.00	-32.20
8.	Richard Meade on Barberry (GBR)	52.67	-118.4	36.00	-29.73
9.	Reuben Jones on Master Bernard (GBR)	35.00	-91.2	30.00	-26.20
10.	German Gazyumov on Gran (URS)	57.33	-80.8	0.00	-23.47
11.	Paolo Angioni on King (ITA)	65.33	-103.2	20.00	-17.87
12.	Kevin Freeman on Gallopade (USA)	69.67	-96.8	10.00	-17.13
13.	Brien Cobcroft on Stony Crossing (AUS)	100.00	-118.4	10.00	-8.40
14.	Giusepye Ravano on Royal Love (ITA)	69.67	-73.2	0.00	-3.53
15.	Michael Plumb on Bold Minstrel (USA)	42.67	-44.0	0.00	-1.33
16.	Thomas Brennan on Kilkenny (IRL)	57.67	-58.0	0.00	-1.13
17.	Elvio Flores on Legitima (ARG)	68.33	-75.6	10.00	2.73
18.	John Harty on San Michele (IRL)	84.00	-99.2	20.00	4.80
19.	Boris Konkov on Rumb (URS)	63.67	-53.2	0.50	10.97
20.	Gerhard Schulz on Balza X (EUA)	60.67	-51.6	20.00	29.07
21.	Pavel Deyev on Satrap (URS)	61.33	-69.2	40.00	32.13
22.	José González on Condor (MEX)	66.00	-69.6	40.00	36.40
23.	J. L. J. le Goff on Leopard (FRA)	52.67	-54.8	40.00	37.87
24.	Jean de Croutte de Saint Martin on Mon Clos (FRA)	62.67	-34.2	10.00	38.47
25.	Karl-Heinz Fuhrmann on Mohamet (EUA)	58.00	-38.0	30.00	50.00
26.	Saibattal Mursalimov on Dzhigit (URS)	50.67	-6.8	10.00	53.87
27.	Hugues Landon on Laurier (FRA)	50.33	-2.8	10.00	57.53
28.	Harry Freeman on St. Finbarr (IRL)	52.33	16.4	0.00	68.73
29.	Juan Gesualdi on Morrina (ARG)	61.67	6.8	20.00	88.47
30.	John Kelly on Brigalow (AUS)	64.67	13.2	30.00	107.84
31.	Eduardo Higareda on Engano (MEX)	61.67	88.0	10.00	159.67
32.	M. Mendivil on Xihuilt (MEX)	69.67	108.4	0.00	178.07
33.	Lana du Pont on Mr. Wister (USA)	52.33	141.6	30.00	223.93
34.	Mikio Chiba on Mauta (JPN)	63.67	174.8	30.00	268.47
—	Neale Lavis on Mirrabooka (AUS)	58.33	-15.2	—	43.13 (DNF)
—	Alessandro Argenton on Scottie (ITA)	59.67	65.2	—	124.87 (DNF)
—	Julio Henri on Imperioso (ARG)	60.33	113.8	—	174.13 (DNF)
—	James Templer on M'Lord Connolly (GBR)	42.67	—	—	42.67 (DNF)
—	Michael Bullen on Sea Breeze (GBR)	54.33	—	—	54.33 (DNF)
—	Jehan LeRoy on Garden (FRA)	56.67	—	—	56.67 (DNF)
—	Joaquín Madrigal on Principiante (MEX)	69.33	—	—	69.33 (DNF)
—	Masanori Katsumoto on Eiten (JPN)	72.00	—	—	72.00 (DNF)
—	Masaki Matsudaira on Nippo (JPN)	73.33	—	—	73.33 (DNF)
—	Rikutoshi Maeda on Hogetsu (JPN)	76.00	—	—	76.00 (DNF)
—	Jo Hyeong-won on General (KOR)	81.00	—	—	81.00 (DNF)
—	Seo Myeong-won on Marshall (KOR)	84.33	—	—	84.33 (DNF)
—	Kim Yeong-ro on Mudgeogongah (KOR)	86.67	—	—	86.67 (DNF)
—	Kim Mun-sik on Silver Moon Light (KOR)	91.17	—	—	91.17 (DNF)

== Sources ==
- Tokyo Organizing Committee (1964). The Games of the XVIII Olympiad: Tokyo 1964, vol. 2.
