= Equestrian at the 1964 Summer Olympics – Team eventing =

Team eventing at the Games of the XVIII Olympiad
- Venue: Karuizawa Equestrian Venue
- Date: 16–19 October 1964
- Competitors: 48 from 12 nations

Medalists
1st place, gold medalist(s)		Mauro Checcoli, Paolo Angioni, Giuseppe Ravano	Italy
2nd place, silver medalist(s)		Michael Page, Kevin Freeman, Michael Plumb	United States
3rd place, bronze medalist(s)		Fritz Ligges, Horst Karsten, Gerhard Schulz	United Team of Germany

The team eventing was an equestrian event held as part of the Equestrian at the 1964 Summer Olympics programme. The event was held from 16 to 19 October, and consisted merely of summing the scores of the team's top 3 (out of 4) horse and rider pairs in the individual eventing.

== Results ==
	Mauro Checcoli on Surbean (ITA)	-85.80	-64.40
	Paolo Angioni on King (ITA)	-85.80	-17.87
	Giuseppe Ravano on Royal Love (ITA)	-85.80	-3.53
	Michael Page on The Grasshopper (USA)	-65.86	-47.40
	Kevin Freeman on Gallopade (USA)	-65.86	-17.13
	Michael Plumb on Bold Minstrel (USA)	-65.86	-1.33
	Fritz Ligges on Donkosak (EUA)	-56.73	-49.20
	Horst Karsten on Condora (EUA)	-56.73	-36.60
	Gerhard Schulz on Balza X (EUA)	-56.73	29.07
4.	Anthony Cameron on Black Salmon (IRL)	-42.86	-46.53
4.	Thomas Brennan on Kilkenny (IRL)	-42.86	-1.13
4.	John Harty on San Michele (IRL)	-42.86	4.80
5.	Herman Gaziumov on Gran (URS)	19.63	-23.47
5.	Boris Konkov on Rumb (URS)	19.63	10.97
5.	Pavel Deev on Satrap (URS)	19.63	32.13
6.	Carlos Moratorio on Chalan (ARG)	34.80	-56.40
6.	Elvio Flores on Legitima (ARG)	34.80	2.73
6.	Juan Gesualdi on Morrina (ARG)	34.80	88.47
7.	Bill Roycroft on El Dorado (AUS)	67.27	-32.20
7.	Brien Cobcroft on Stony Crossing (AUS)	67.27	-8.40
7.	John Kelly on Brigalow (AUS)	67.27	107.87
8.	J. L. J. le Goff on Leopard (FRA)	133.87	37.87
8.	J. de Croutte on Mon Clos (FRA)	133.87	38.47
8.	Hugues Landon on Laurier (FRA)	133.87	57.53
9.	J. R. Gonzalez on Condor (MEX)	374.14	36.40
9.	Eduardo Higaredo on Engano (MEX)	374.14	159.67
9.	M. Mendivil on Xihuilt (MEX)	374.14	178.07
—	Richard Meade on Barberry (GBR)	—	-29.73
—	Reuben Jones on Master Bernard (GBR)	—	-26.20
—	James Templar on M'Lord Connolly (GBR)	—	DNF
—	Chiba Mikio on Mauta (JPN)	—	268.47
—	Matsudaira Masaki on Nippo (JPN)	—	DNF
—	Maeda Rikutoshi on Hogetsu (JPN)	—	DNF
—	Cho Hyung Won on General (KOR)	—	DNF
—	Suh Myoung Won on Marshall (KOR)	—	DNF
—	Kim Young Ro on Mudgeogongah (KOR)	—	DNF

== Sources ==
- Tokyo Organizing Committee (1964). The Games of the XVIII Olympiad: Tokyo 1964, vol. 2.
