= Argentina at the 1968 Summer Olympics =

- IOC code: ARG
- NOC: Argentine Olympic Committee

in Mexico City
- Competitors: 89 (84 men and 5 women) in 12 sports
- Flag bearer: Carlos Moratorio
- Medals Ranked 41st: Gold 0 Silver 0 Bronze 2 Total 2

Summer Olympics appearances (overview)
- 1900; 1904; 1908; 1912; 1920; 1924; 1928; 1932; 1936; 1948; 1952; 1956; 1960; 1964; 1968; 1972; 1976; 1980; 1984; 1988; 1992; 1996; 2000; 2004; 2008; 2012; 2016; 2020; 2024; 2028

Argentina competed at the 1968 Summer Olympics in Mexico City, Mexico. 89 competitors, 84 men and 5 women, took part in 61 events in 12 sports.

== Medalists ==
Medal	Name	Sport	Event	Date
Bronze	Mario Guilloti	Boxing	Men's welterweight	24 October
Bronze	Alberto Demiddi	Rowing	Men's single sculls	19 October

== Athletics ==
Men

Athlete	Events	Heat		Quarterfinal		Semifinal		Final	
Athlete	Events	Result	Rank	Result	Rank	Result	Rank	Result	Rank
Andrés Calonge	100 m	10.44	2 Q	10.39	5	did not advance			
Andrés Calonge	200 m	20.81	2 Q	21.03	6	did not advance			
Juan Carlos Dyrzka	400 m	47.02	4 Q	46.85	7	did not advance			
Juan Carlos Dyrzka	400 m hurdles	—N/a		49.8	1 Q	48.8	5	did not advance	
Guillermo Cuello	800 m	did not finish		—N/a		did not advance			
Guillermo Cuello	1500 m	did not start		—N/a		did not advance			
Domingo Amaizón	3000 m steeplechase	9:43.06	12	—N/a				did not advance	
Enrico Barney	Pole vault	4.80	17	—N/a				did not advance	

Women

Athlete	Events	Heat		Quarterfinal		Semifinal		Final	
Athlete	Events	Result	Rank	Result	Rank	Result	Rank	Result	Rank
Alicia Kaufmanas	100 m	11.8	6	did not advance					
Alicia Kaufmanas	200 m	24.4	5	did not advance					

== Boxing ==
Athlete	Event	Round of 64	Round of 32	Round of 16	Quarterfinals	Semifinals	Final
Athlete	Event	Opposition Result	Opposition Result	Opposition Result	Opposition Result	Opposition Result	Rank
Roberto Urretavizcaya	Light flyweight	—N/a	Espinal (DOM); W w/o	Donovan (AUS); L 0 – 5	did not advance		
Tito Pereyra	Flyweight	—N/a	Carney (AUS); W 4 – 1	Nakamura (JPN); L 0 – 5	did not advance		
Domingo Casco	Bantamweight	Ladjili (TUN); W 3 – 2	Cervantes (MEX); L DSQ	did not advance			
Miguel García	Featherweight	—N/a	Oduardo (CUB); W 3 – 2	Simion (ROU); W 5 – 0	Waruinge (KEN); L 1 – 4	did not advance	
Pedro Agüero	Lightweight	Arpon (PHI); W 3 – 2	Gadir (SUD); W 5 – 0	Petriglia (ITA); L 2 – 3	did not advance		
Mario Guilloti	Welterweight	Bye	Kajjo (UGA); W 4 – 1	Paduano (CAN); W 5 – 0	Muñíz (USA); W 4 – 1	Bessala (CMR); L 0 – 5	3rd place, bronze medalist(s)
Víctor Galíndez	Light middleweight	—N/a	Bentini (ITA); L 0 – 5	did not advance			

== Cycling ==
Nine cyclists represented Argentina in 1968.

Road race, time trial

Athlete	Event	Time	Rank
Juan Alves	Individual road race	did not finish	
Roberto Breppe	Individual road race	4:48:07	40
Héctor Cassina	Individual road race	did not finish	
Gerardo Cavallieri	Individual road race	did not finish	
José Pittaro	Individual time trial	1:05.57	9
Carlos Álvarez; Roberto Breppe; Ernesto Contreras; Juan Alberto Merlos	Team time trial	2:15:34.24	7

Sprint

Athlete	Event	Round 1 Repechage		Round 2 Repechage		1/8 Finals Repechage		Quarterfinals		Semifinals		Final	
Athlete	Event	Time	Rank	Time	Rank	Time	Rank	Time	Rank	Time	Rank	Time	Rank
José Pittaro	Men's sprint	11.41	2; 1 Q		2; 3	did not advance							
Carlos Roqueiro	Men's sprint	11.15	2; 1 Q		3; 2	did not advance							

Pursuit

Athlete	Event	Qualification		Quarterfinals		Semifinals		Final	
Athlete	Event	Time	Rank	Time	Rank	Time	Rank	Time	Rank
Juan Alberto Merlos	Individual pursuit	4:47.81	12	did not advance					
Carlos Álvarez; Roberto Breppe; Ernesto Contreras; Juan Alberto Merlos	Team pursuit	4:26.22	9	did not advance					

== Equestrian ==
=== Eventing ===
Athlete	Horse	Event	Dressage		Cross-country		Show jumping		Total	
Athlete	Horse	Event	Points	Rank	Points	Rank	Points	Rank	Points	Rank
José Eugenio Acosta	Oligarca	Individual	-110.01	41	-155.20	34	-12.75	=18	-277.96	29
Jorge Bedoya	Naranjo	Individual	-91.50	26	DSQ		did not finish			
Carlos Moratorio	Hijo Manso	Individual	-68.01	=6	-294.00	39	-1.25	6	-363.26	34
Roberto Pistarini	Warti	Individual	-90.00	25	-150.00	33	DSQ		did not finish	
José Eugenio Acosta; Jorge Bedoya; Carlos Moratorio; Roberto Pistarini	Oligarca; Naranjo; Hijo Manso; Warti	Team	-249.51	8	-599.20	11	did not finish			

=== Show jumping ===
Athlete	Horse	Event	Round 1		Round 2		Total	
Athlete	Horse	Event	Points	Rank	Points	Rank	Points	Rank
Jorge Amaya	Gemelo	Individual	DSQ		did not finish			
Carlos Delía	Scandale	Individual	8.00	=9	12.00	=11	20.00	=13
Argentino Molinuevo Jr.	Don Gustavo	Individual	8.00	=9	8.00	=4	16.00	=7
Jorge Amaya; Argentino Molinuevo Jr. Roberto Tagle	Gemelo; Don Gustavo; Ojo Chico	Team	113.50	10	161.50	14	275.00	13

== Fencing ==
Ten fencers, nine men and one woman, represented Argentina in 1968.

Athlete	Event	First round		Second round		Round of 16	Quarterfinals	Semifinals	Final	Repechage					Final round	
Athlete	Event	First round		Second round		Round of 16	Quarterfinals	Semifinals	Final	Round of 32	Round of 16	Quarterfinals	Semifinals	Final	Final round	
Athlete	Event	Record	Rank	Record	Rank	Opposition Result	Opposition Result	Opposition Result	Opposition Result	Opposition Result	Opposition Result	Opposition Result	Opposition Result	Opposition Result	Record	Rank
Alberto Balestrini	Men's épée	1W – 4L	6	did not advance					—N/a	did not advance						
Guillermo Obeid	Men's épée	1W – 4L	6	did not advance					—N/a	did not advance						
Omar Vergara	Men's épée	3W – 2L	2 Q	1W – 4L	6	did not advance			—N/a	did not advance						
Alberto Balestrini; Guillermo Obeid; Guillermo Saucedo; Omar Vergara	Men's team épée	0W – 2L	6	—N/a		did not advance				—N/a			did not advance		—N/a	
Orlando Nannini	Men's foil	1W – 4L	6	did not advance					—N/a	did not advance						
Evaristo Prendes	Men's foil	0W – 4L	6	did not advance					—N/a	did not advance						
Guillermo Saucedo	Men's foil	3W – 1L	1 Q	4W – 1L	2 Q	La Ragione (ITA); L	did not advance		—N/a	Szabó (HUN); L	did not advance					
Orlando Nannini; Evaristo Prendes; Guillermo Saucedo; Omar Vergara	Men's team foil	0W – 2L	3	—N/a		did not advance				—N/a			did not advance		—N/a	
Juan Carlos Frecia	Men's sabre	0W – 6L	7	did not advance		—N/a	did not advance		—N/a			did not advance				
Alberto Lanteri	Men's sabre	2W – 4L	6	did not advance		—N/a	did not advance		—N/a			did not advance				
Román Quinos	Men's sabre	2W – 4L	5	did not advance		—N/a	did not advance		—N/a			did not advance				
Juan Carlos Frecia; Alberto Lanteri; Guillermo Saucedo; Román Quinos	Men's team sabre	0W – 2L	3	—N/a		did not advance				—N/a			did not advance		—N/a	
Sylvia Iannuzzi-San Martín	Women's foil	1W – 5L	7	did not advance		—N/a	did not advance		—N/a			did not advance				

== Sailing ==
Open

Athlete	Event	Race														Final rank	
Athlete	Event	1		2		3		4		5		6		7		Final rank	
Athlete	Event	Score	Rank	Score	Rank	Score	Rank	Score	Rank	Score	Rank	Score	Rank	Score	Rank	Score	Rank
Alberto Obarrio	Finn	~~DNF~~	~~42~~	16	22	13	19	18	24	13	19	8	14	21	27	125	17
Roberto Sieburger; Jorge Vago	Star	15	21	14	20	19	25	18	24	14	20	19	25	~~DNF~~	~~42~~	135	20
Héctor Schenone; Boris Belada; Pedro Sisti	Dragon	~~15~~	~~21~~	9	15	7	13	5	10	17	23	10	16	11	17	92	9

== Shooting ==
Four shooters, all men, represented Argentina in 1968.

25 m pistol

- Oscar Cervo
- Nelson Torno

Trap

- Rodolfo Guarnieri
- Juan Ángel Martini, Jr.

== Swimming ==
Men

Athlete	Event	Heat		Semifinal		Final	
Athlete	Event	Time	Rank	Time	Rank	Time	Rank
Luis Nicolao	100 m freestyle	54.6	=4 Q	53.8	3 Q	53.9	7
Carlos van der Maath	100 m freestyle	56.4	=31	Did not advance			
Luis Nicolao	200 m freestyle	2:01.8	=13	—N/a		Did not advance	
Leonardo Baremboin	100 m backstroke	1:04.0	=17	Did not advance			
Leonardo Baremboin	200 m backstroke	2:25.2	25	—N/a		Did not advance	
Osvaldo Boretto	100 m breaststroke	1:10.3	=15 Q	1:11.8	23	Did not advance	
Alberto Forelli	100 m breaststroke	1:09.3	=4 Q	1:08.9	=6 Q	1:08.7	7
Osvaldo Boretto	200 m breaststroke	2:38.8	17	—N/a		Did not advance	
Alberto Forelli	200 m breaststroke	2:41.7	25	—N/a		Did not advance	
Luis Nicolao	100 m butterfly	59.3	=7 Q	DNS		Did not advance	
Leonardo Baremboin; Alberto Forelli; Luis Nicolao; Carlos van der Maath	4 × 100 m medley relay	4:08.4	10	—N/a		Did not advance	

Women

Athlete	Event	Heat		Semifinal		Final	
Athlete	Event	Time	Rank	Time	Rank	Time	Rank
Adriana Comolli	100 m backstroke	1:13.8	29	Did not advance			
María Procopio	100 m backstroke	1:15.9	34	Did not advance			
Patricia Sentous	100 m backstroke	1:13.5	28	Did not advance			
María Procopio	200 m backstroke	2:49.2	27	—N/a		Did not advance	
Patricia Sentous	200 m backstroke	2:41.5	25	—N/a		Did not advance	
Adriana Comolli	100 m butterfly	1:16.5	26	Did not advance			
