= Argentina at the 1964 Summer Olympics =

- IOC code: ARG
- NOC: Argentine Olympic Committee

in Tokyo
- Competitors: 102 (96 men and 6 women) in 14 sports
- Flag bearer: Jeannette Campbell
- Medals Ranked 30th: Gold 0 Silver 1 Bronze 0 Total 1

Summer Olympics appearances (overview)
- 1900; 1904; 1908; 1912; 1920; 1924; 1928; 1932; 1936; 1948; 1952; 1956; 1960; 1964; 1968; 1972; 1976; 1980; 1984; 1988; 1992; 1996; 2000; 2004; 2008; 2012; 2016; 2020; 2024

Argentina competed at the 1964 Summer Olympics in Tokyo, Japan. 102 competitors, 96 men and 6 women, took part in 78 events in 14 sports.

== Medalists ==
Medal	Name	Sport	Event	Date
Silver	Carlos Moratorio	Equestrian	Individual eventing	19 October

== Athletics ==
Argentina was represented by two male and four female athletes.

Men:

- 400 metres - Juan Carlos Dyrzka (eliminated in round 1, 6th place in heat 3)
- Marathon - Osvaldo Suárez (did not finish)
- 110 metres hurdles - Juan Carlos Dyrzka (eliminated in round 1, 7th place in heat 2)
- 400 metres hurdles - Juan Carlos Dyrzka (eliminated in round 2, 8th place in heat 2)

Women:

- 100 metres - Margarita Formeiro (eliminated in round 1, 7th place in heat 6)
- 200 metres - Susana Ritchie (eliminated in round 1, 5th place in heat 2)
- 4 × 100 metres relay - Argentina was eliminated in round 1 (5th place in heat 2)

Margarita Formeiro, Susana Ritchie, Evelia Farina, Alicia Kaufmanas; (Emilia Dyrzka and Marta Buongiorno did not compete)

- Long jump - Evelia Farina (26th place); Alicia Kaufmanas (30th place)

== Boxing ==
Argentina was represented by 10 male boxers.

- Flyweight - Luis Romo (=17th place)
- Bantamweight - Abel Almaraz (=9th place)
- Featherweight - Hugo Martínez (=17th place)
- Lightweight - Héctor Pace (=9th place)
- Light welterweight - Roberto Amaya (=17th place)
- Welterweight - Felipe Pereyra (=9th place)
- Light middleweight - José Roberto Chirino (=9th place)
- Middleweight - Juan Aguilar (=9th place)
- Light heavyweight - Rafael Gargiulo (=5th place)
- Heavyweight - Santiago Lovell Jr. (=5th place)

== Cycling ==
Ten cyclists represented Argentina in 1964.

Individual road race

- Delmo Delmastro
- Roberto Breppe
- Rubén Placanica

Team time trial

- Héctor Acosta
- Roberto Breppe
- Delmo Delmastro
- Rubén Placanica

Sprint

- Oscar García
- Carlos Alberto Vázquez

1000m time trial

- Carlos Alberto Vázquez

Team pursuit

- Carlos Alberto Álvarez
- Ernesto Contreras
- Juan Alberto Merlos
- Alberto Trillo

== Equestrian ==
The Argentinian equestrian team contained 8 horsemen.

Dressage:

- Individual, Open - Francisco D'Alessandri (13th place)

Eventing:

- Individual, Open - Carlos Moratorio (2nd place) Silver Medal

Elvio Flores (17th place); Juan Gesualdi (29th place); Julio Henry (did not finish)

- Team, Open - Argentina: 6th place

Carlos Moratorio, Elvio Flores, Juan Gesualdi, Julio Henry

Jumping:

- Individual, Open - Jorge Cánaves (12th place); Hugo Arrambide (17th place); Carlos César Delía (or Delia) (22nd place)
- Team, Open - Argentina: 5th place

Jorge Cánaves, Hugo Arrambide, Carlos César Delía

== Fencing ==
Eleven fencers, ten men and one woman, represented Argentina in 1964.

Men's foil

- Orlando Nannini
- Jesús Taboada
- Adolfo Bisellach

Men's team foil

- Adolfo Bisellach, Jesús Taboada, Alberto Lanteri, Orlando Nannini, Félix Galimi

Men's épée

- Zelmar Casco
- Francisco Serp
- Jesús Taboada

Men's team épée

- Félix Galimi, Zelmar Casco, Jesús Taboada, Francisco Serp

Men's sabre

- Alberto Lanteri
- Rafael González
- Juan Carlos Frecia

Men's team sabre

- Rafael González, Juan Carlos Frecia, Julian Velásquez, Alberto Lanteri

Women's foil

- María Romano

== Football ==
The Argentinian football tean finished in =9th place.

Agustín Cejas, Andrés Bertolotti, Antonio Cabrera, Carlos Alberto Bulla, Héctor Ochoa, Horacio Morales, José Malleo, Juan Carlos Domínguez, Juan Risso, Miguel Mori, Miguel Tojo, Néstor Manfredi, Otto Sesana, Roberto Perfumo
Francisco Brandán, José Miguel Marín, Emilio Antonio Pazos, Ricardo Pérez, Juan Carlos Sconfianza - did not compete

== Gymnastics ==
Argentina was represented by one male gymnast.

- Individual all-around - Carlos Pizzini (112th place)
- Floor exercise - Carlos Pizzini (112th place)
- Vault - Carlos Pizzini (=90th place)
- Parallel bars - Carlos Pizzini (106th place)
- Horizontal bar - Carlos Pizzini (122nd place)
- Rings - Carlos Pizzini (=111 place)
- Pommel horse - Carlos Pizzini (=101st place)

== Judo ==
Argentina was represented by three male competitors.

- Lightweight - Oscar Karpenkopf otherwise Óscar Karpencopf (=9th place)
- Middleweight - Rodolfo Pérez (=5th place)
- Heavyweight - Miguel Casella otherwise Michel Angel Casella (=6th place)

== Rowing ==
Argentina was represented by 12 male competitors.

- Single Sculls - Alberto Demiddi (4th place)
- Double Sculls - Juan Carlos Gómez and José María Robledo (12th place)
- Coxless Pairs - Carlos Montaldo and Ricardo Durán (did not start) DNS r3/3
- Coxed Pairs - Natalio Rossi, Juan Pedro Lier and Oscar Rompani (did not start) DNS r3/3
- Coxless Fours - Juan Francisco Zanassi, Atilio Ensunza, Jorge Meana, Juan Alberto Iannuzzi (4th place; heat 2 of round 3)

== Sailing ==
Open

Athlete	Event	Race														Final rank	
Athlete	Event	1		2		3		4		5		6		7		Final rank	
Athlete	Event	Score	Rank	Score	Rank	Score	Rank	Score	Rank	Score	Rank	Score	Rank	Score	Rank	Score	Rank
Ricardo Boneo	Finn	20	318	23	258	~~25~~	~~222~~	19	341	25	222	28	172	25	222	1583	26
Roberto Sieburger; Arnoldo Pekelharing	Star	14	185	15	155	6	553	~~16~~	~~127~~	12	252	13	218	15	155	1518	12
Jorge Salas Chávez; Jorge del Río Sálas; Rodolfo Rivademar	Dragon	7	618	3	986	~~18~~	~~207~~	12	384	15	287	11	421	3	986	3682	10

== Shooting ==
Eight shooters represented Argentina in 1964.

25 m pistol

- Manuel José Fernández
- Juan Carlos Oxoby

50 m pistol

- Humberto Aspitia

50 m rifle, three positions

- Eduardo Armella

50 m rifle, prone

- Melchor López
- Cirilo Nassiff

Trap

- Juan Ángel Martini, Sr.
- José Passera

== Swimming ==
Argentina was represented by 6 male swimmers and one female swimmer.

Men

Athlete	Event	Heat		Semifinal		Final	
Athlete	Event	Time	Rank	Time	Rank	Time	Rank
Carlos van der Maath	100 m freestyle	57.5	45	Did not advance			
Luis Nicolao	100 m freestyle	56.1	=26	Did not advance			
Carlos van der Maath	400 m freestyle	4:30.2	25	—		Did not advance	
Ricardo Morello	1500 m freestyle	18:46.5	28	—		Did not advance	
Pedro Diz	200 m backstroke	2:24.9	=26	Did not advance			
Carlos van der Maath	200 m backstroke	2:19.6	16 Q	2:21.3	16	Did not advance	
Miguel Ángel Navarro	200 m breaststroke	2:49.7	31	Did not advance			
Luis Nicolao	200 m butterfly	2:15.0	9 Q	2:13.7	11	Did not advance	
Carlos van der Maath; Miguel Ángel Navarro; Luis Nicolao; Alfredo Bourdillón	4 × 100 m medley relay	4:15.8	11	—		Did not advance	

Women

Athlete	Event	Heat		Final	
Athlete	Event	Time	Rank	Time	Rank
Susana Peper	100 m backstroke	1:13.2	25	Did not advance	
Susana Peper	200 m breaststroke	3:00.0	22	Did not advance	

== Weightlifting ==
Argentina was represented by two male weightlifters.

- Light heavyweight - Martín Eguiguren (did not finish)
- Heavyweight - Humberto Selvetti (17th place)

== Wrestling ==
Four wrestlers competed on behalf of Argentina.

Greco-Roman:

- Featherweight - Rubén Leibovich - eliminated in 2nd round
- Lightweight - Raúl Romero - eliminated in 1st round
- Welterweight - Carlos Alberto Vario - eliminated in 2nd round
- Middleweight - Julio Graffigna - eliminated in 2nd round

Freestyle:

- Bantamweight - Rubén Leibovich - eliminated in 2nd round
- Featherweight - Raúl Romero - eliminated in 2nd round
- Lightweight - Carlos Alberto Vario - eliminated in 4th round
- Welterweight - Julio Graffigna - eliminated in 3rd round
