= Ireland at the 1968 Summer Olympics =

- IOC code: IRL
- NOC: Olympic Federation of Ireland
- Website: olympics.ie

in Mexico City
- Competitors: 31 in 7 sports
- Flag bearer: Jim McCourt
- Medals: Gold 0 Silver 0 Bronze 0 Total 0

Summer Olympics appearances (overview)
- 1924; 1928; 1932; 1936; 1948; 1952; 1956; 1960; 1964; 1968; 1972; 1976; 1980; 1984; 1988; 1992; 1996; 2000; 2004; 2008; 2012; 2016; 2020; 2024

Other related appearances
- Great Britain (1896–1920)

Ireland competed at the 1968 Summer Olympics in Mexico City, Mexico. 31 competitors, 25 men and 6 women, took part in 32 events in 7 sports. They did not win any medals.

== Athletics ==
Athlete	Event	Heat		Semifinal		Final	
Athlete	Event	Time	Rank	Time	Rank	Time	Rank
Noel Carroll	Men's 400m	46.83	6	Did Not Advance			
Noel Carroll	Men's 800m	1:49.0	3	Did Not Advance			
Frank Murphy	Men's 1500m	3:54.85	10	Did Not Advance			
Pat McMahon	Men's Marathon	–				2:29:21	12
Mick Molloy	Men's Marathon	–				2:48:13	41
John Kelly	Men's 50km Walk	–				DNF	

== Cycling ==
Three cyclists represented Ireland in 1968.

Individual road race

- Peter Doyle DNF
- Morris Foster DNF
- Liam Horner DNF

== Equestrian ==
=== Individual Eventing ===
- Juliet Jobling-Purser on Jenny 10th
- Penelope Moreton on Loughlin 12th
- Thomas Brennan on March Hawk 28th
- Diana Wilson on Chianti Rosso 47th

=== Team Eventing ===
Rider	Horse	Rank
Juliet Jobling-Purser	Jenny	7th
Thomas Brennan	March Hawk	7th
Diana Wilson	Chianti Rosso	7th
Penelope Moreton	Loughlin	7th

== Fencing ==
Four fencers, all men, represented Ireland in 1968.

Men's foil

- Michael Ryan – Eliminated after Round 1
- John Bouchier-Hayes – Eliminated after Round 1
- Fionbarr Farrell – Eliminated after Round 1

Men's team foil

- Fionbarr Farrell, John Bouchier-Hayes, Michael Ryan, Colm O'Brien =16th

Men's épée

- Colm O'Brien – Eliminated in Round 2
- Michael Ryan – Eliminated after Round 1

Men's team épée

- John Bouchier-Hayes, Fionbarr Farrell, Michael Ryan, Colm O'Brien =16th

Men's sabre

- Colm O'Brien – Eliminated after Round 1
- John Bouchier-Hayes – Eliminated after Round 1
- Fionbarr Farrell – Eliminated after Round 1

Men's team sabre

- Colm O'Brien, Fionbarr Farrell, Michael Ryan, John Bouchier-Hayes =9th

== Shooting ==
Three shooters, all men, represented Ireland in 1968.

Trap

- Dermot Kelly 47th

Skeet

- Gerry Brady 38th
- Arthur McMahon 47th

== Swimming ==
Athlete	Event	Heat		Semifinal		Final	
Athlete	Event	Time	Rank	Time	Rank	Time	Rank
Donnacha O'Dea	Men's 100 m freestyle	59.5	55	Did not advance			
Donnacha O'Dea	Men's 100 m butterfly	1:02.8	38	Did not advance			
Donnacha O'Dea	Men's 200 metre individual medley	2:36.6	40	–		Did not advance	
Liam Ball	Men's 100 m breaststroke	1:12.1	27	Did not advance			
Liam Ball	Men's 200 m breaststroke	2:39.8	20	—N/a		Did not advance	
Ann O'Connor	Women's 200 m breaststroke	2:56.4	18	—N/a		Did not advance	
Vivienne Smith	Women's 100 m butterfly	1:13.1	21	Did not advance			
Vivienne Smith	Women's 200 m butterfly	2:39.7	11	—N/a		Did not advance	
