= Fencing at the 1963 Pan American Games =

Fencing at the 1963 Pan American Games lists the results of all fencing-shooting events held at the 1963 Pan American Games in São Paulo, Brazil. Events for both men and women were held.

== Men's events ==
| Event | Gold | Silver | Bronze |
|---|---|---|---|
| Individual épée | Frank Anger; United States | Sergio Vergara Parada; Chile | Alberto Balestrini Bogino; Argentina |
| Team épée | United States of America; United States | Aloysio Alves Borges; Arthur Telles Ribeiro; Carlos Luiz Couto; José Maria Pereira; Brazil | Argentina; Argentina |
| Individual foil | Guillermo Jorge Saucedo Díaz; Argentina | Albert Axelrod; United States | Herbert Cohen; United States |
| Team foil | United States; Edwn Richards; Herbert Cohen; Albert Axelrod; Martin Davis | Argentina; Argentina | Venezuela; Venezuela |
| Individual sabre | Michael Dasaro; United States | Walter Farber; United States | Chaba Pallaghy; United States |
| Team sabre | United States; Edwin Allan Richards; Harold Mayer; Alfonso Hector Morales; Miklos Chaba Pallaghy; Walter Farber; Michael Dasaro | Argentina; Juan Carlos Bascolo; Guillermo Jorge Saucedo Díaz; Alfredo Juan Hernandez; Julián Velásquez; Gloro Fulgencio Diaz Arnesto | Chile; Chile |

== Women's events ==
| Event | Gold | Silver | Bronze |
|---|---|---|---|
| Individual foil | Mireya Rodríguez Solar; Cuba | Harriet King; United States | Janice Romary; United States |
| Team foil | United States; Harriet King; Bonnie Linkmeyer; Maxine Mitchell; Ann Drungis | Venezuela; Venezuela | Argentina; Argentina |

== Medal table ==
| Rank | Nation | Gold | Silver | Bronze | Total |
|---|---|---|---|---|---|
| 1 | United States | 6 | 3 | 3 | 12 |
| 2 | Argentina | 1 | 2 | 3 | 6 |
| 3 | Cuba | 1 | 0 | 0 | 1 |
| 4 | Chile | 0 | 1 | 1 | 2 |
| 4 | Venezuela | 0 | 1 | 1 | 2 |
| 6 | Brazil | 0 | 1 | 0 | 1 |
| Totals (6 entries) | | 8 | 8 | 8 | 24 |
