= Moon-sik =

- Hangul: 문식
- RR: Munsik
- MR: Munsik

Moon-sik, also spelled Moon-shik, Mun-sik, or Mun-shik, is a Korean given name.

People with this name include:

- Chae Mun-shik (채문식, 1925–2010), Speaker of the National Assembly of South Korea (1983–1985)
- Yoon Mun-sik (born 1945), South Korean actor
- Lee Moon-sik (born 1967), South Korean actor
- Choi Moon-sik (born 1971), South Korean footballer
- Kim Moon-shik, represented South Korea in Equestrian at the 1964 Summer Olympics – Individual eventing

Fictional characters with this name include:

- Choi Moon-shik, from 2013 South Korean television series Who Are You?

== See also ==
- List of Korean given names
