= Gesualdi =

Gesualdi is an Italian surname. Notable people with the surname include:

- Emanuele Gesualdi (born 2004), Italian entrepreneur and founder of clothing brand Gesualdi Aviation
- Carlos Rodrigues Gesualdi (born 1963), Argentinean writer, teacher, lecturer, and translator
- Juan Gesualdi (born 1929), Argentine equestrian
