= The Grasshopper (horse) =

Irish-bred American eventing horse

- Breed: Connemara Crossbreed
- Sire: Tutor (Thoroughbred)
- Grandsire: Priori (Thoroughbred)
- Sex: Gelding
- Foaled: 1948, Ireland
- Colour: Bay
- Owner: Mrs. John Galvin

Major wins
- 1959 Pan American Games, individual gold 1963 Pan Am Games, individual gold

Olympic medal record

Equestrian
Silver medal – second place	1964 Tokyo	Team eventing

The Grasshopper was a horse that competed in the sport of eventing, and is most notable for being one of only five horses to have competed in six or more CCIOs. He stood 15.1 hands (61 inches, 155 cm) high. A two time winner of the Pan American Games, and three time participant in the Olympic games, The Grasshopper is in the USA Eventing Hall of Fame.

== Background ==
The Grasshopper, foaled in Ireland under the name "Copper Coin," was by the little Thoroughbred Tutor, who was known as a producer of show jumpers and eventers. He was first purchased by Col. Joe Dudgeon as a ride for his son, Ian. Ian Dudgeon competing The Grasshopper in the 1956 Olympic Games in Stockholm, where they had a clear cross-country round but were eliminated for missing a flag.

=== United States eventing career ===
Grasshopper was then sold to Mrs. John Galvin, who shipped him to her ranch in Santa Barbara, California. Mrs. Galvin invited the United States Eventing Team to her ranch to train two years later, and Michael Page was assigned to ride Grasshopper. The pair had an excellent career, with an individual gold in both the 1959 Pan American Games in Chicago and the 1963 Pan Am Games in São Paulo, Brazil. They continued their career with the 1960 Summer Olympics and the 1964 Tokyo Olympics, the latter in which Grasshopper was on the silver medal team.

The little horse is most known to be one of only five horses in the sport to have competed in six or more CCIOs (Official International Team Competitions). He shares this honor with another great American horse, Kilkenny, as well as three British horses: The Poacher, Random Light and Priceless.

Grasshopper's final rider Michael O. Page said of him:

"Grasshopper was neither very big nor very handsome, but such was his toughness, mentally and physically, that he never started an international event in which he was not expected to produce the fastest time cross-country... I don't expect ever to see another horse like him."

== Achievements ==
- 1955 European Championships – Penelope Moreton
- 1956 Melbourne Olympic Games – Ian Dudgeon
- 1959 Chicago Pan American Games – Michael Page: individual gold and team silver
- 1960 Rome Olympic Games – Michael Page: 7th individually
- 1963 São Paulo Pan American Games – Michael Page: individual and team gold
- 1964 Tokyo Olympic Games – Michael Page: 4th individually, team silver
