= Higareda =

Higareda is a surname. Notable people with the surname include:

- Eduardo Higareda (born 1937), Mexican equestrian
- Martha Higareda (born 1983), Mexican actress, film producer, and writer
- Miriam Higareda (born 1984), Mexican actress, sister of Martha
