= Miguel Navarro =

Miguel Navarro may refer to:

- Miguel Navarro (swimmer) (born 1982), Bolivian swimmer
- Miguel Angel Navarro (Argentine swimmer) (born 1941), Argentine swimmer
- Miguel Navarro (runner) (born 1929), Spanish runner
- Miguel Navarro (footballer)
