= Pistarini =

Pistarini is an Italian surname. Notable people with this surname include:

- Juan Pistarini (1882–1956), Argentinian general and politician
- Pascual Pistarini (1915–1999), Argentinian equestrian and general
- Roberto Pistarini (born 1948), Argentinian equestrian

== See also ==
- Ministro Pistarini International Airport
