= Jean Guyon (disambiguation) =

Jean Guyon (1592-1663) was a French pioneer in Canada.

Jean Guyon may also refer to:

- Jean Guyon (fl. early 16c), French composer
- Jean-Louis-Geneviève Guyon (1794–1870), French military surgeon
- Jean Casimir Félix Guyon (1831–1920), French surgeon and urologist
- Jean-Raymond Guyon (1900-1961), French politician
- Jean-Jacques Guyon (1932–2017), French equestrian
- Jean Guyon (historian) (born 1945), French historian
