= Jean-Louis Martin =

Jean-Louis Martin may refer to:

- Jean-Louis Martin (bishop) (born 1934), Canadian-born Peruvian Roman Catholic bishop
- Jean-Louis Martin (equestrian) (born 1939), French equestrian
- Jean-Louis Martin (politician) (1823–1861), political figure in Quebec
- Jean-Louis Martin (rugby union) (born 1948), French rugby union player
