= Training the Three-Day Event Horse and Rider =

1995 book by James C. Wofford

- Author: James C. Wofford
- Language: English
- Series: Doubleday Equestrian Library Series
- Subject: Eventing
- Genre: Non-fiction
- Publisher: Doubleday
- Publication date: 1995
- Publication place: United States
- ISBN: 0-385-42520-1

Training the Three-Day Event Horse and Rider (ISBN 0-385-42520-1) is a 1995 book written by James C. Wofford, covering each phase of the equestrian sport of eventing, as well as a brief history of the event and a section on choosing a proper horse for the sport. The book ends with a section on conditioning and interval training, and provides several grids for gymnastic jumping. The book is considered a classic by American eventers.

The book is part of the Doubleday Equestrian Library Series (Doubleday, NY). It began printing in 1995, was discontinued, and then began reprinting in 2006.

== Chapters ==
- History and Development of the Three-Day Event
- Selecting and Evaluating the Three-Day Prospect
- Equipment for Horse and Rider
- Dressage
- Cross-Country
- Show Jumping
- Conditioning
- Putting It All Together
  - Appendix I: Interval Notation and Conditioning Gallops
  - Appendix II: Sample Schedules
  - Appendix III: Gymnastic Show Jumping
