= Fritz Ligges =

German equestrian

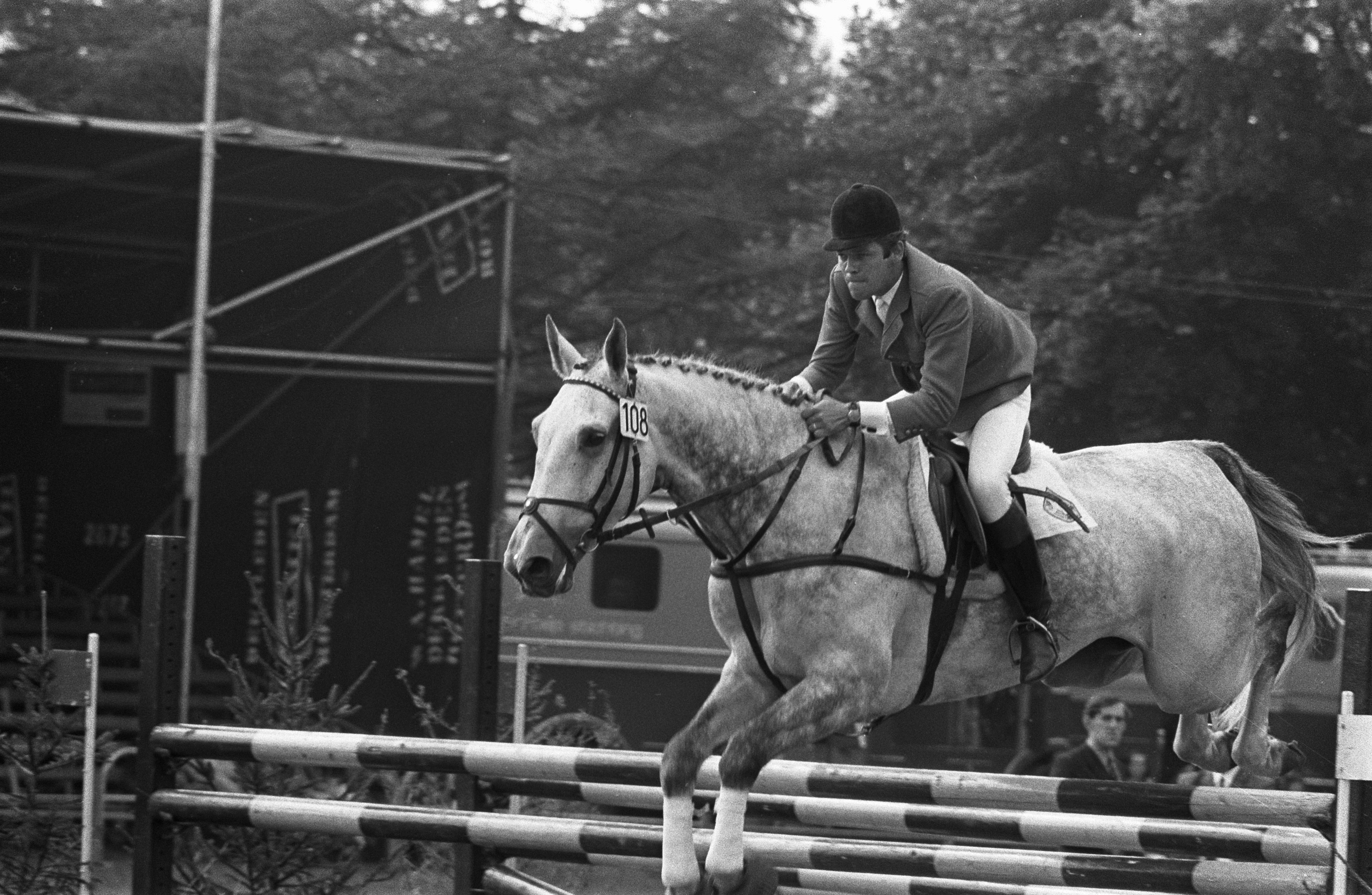

Medal record

Equestrian

Representing Germany

Olympic Games
Bronze medal – third place	1964 Tokyo	Individual eventing
Bronze medal – third place	1964 Tokyo	Team eventing

Representing West Germany

Olympic Games
Gold medal – first place	1972 Munich	Team jumping
Bronze medal – third place	1984 Los Angeles	Team jumping

Fritz Ligges (29 July 1938 in Asseln – 21 May 1996 in Herbern) was a German equestrian and Olympic champion.

== Career ==
=== Olympics career ===
He won a gold medal in show jumping with the West German team at the 1972 Summer Olympics in Munich.

=== Coaching career ===
Ligges was later coach for the national junior team of Germany.
