= Joaquín Madrigal =

Mexican equestrian

Personal information
- Nationality: Mexican
- Born: 17 December 1934 (age 90)

Sport
- Sport: Equestrian

Joaquín Madrigal (born 17 December 1934) is a Mexican equestrian. He competed in two events at the 1964 Summer Olympics.
