= Carlos Rodrigues Gesualdi =

Argentinean writer, teacher, lecturer and translator

Carlos Rodrigues Gesualdi is an Argentinean writer, teacher, lecturer and translator living in Germany, author of children’s novels and of stories published in various countries. His novel "Raros Peinados" is a classic in Argentina.

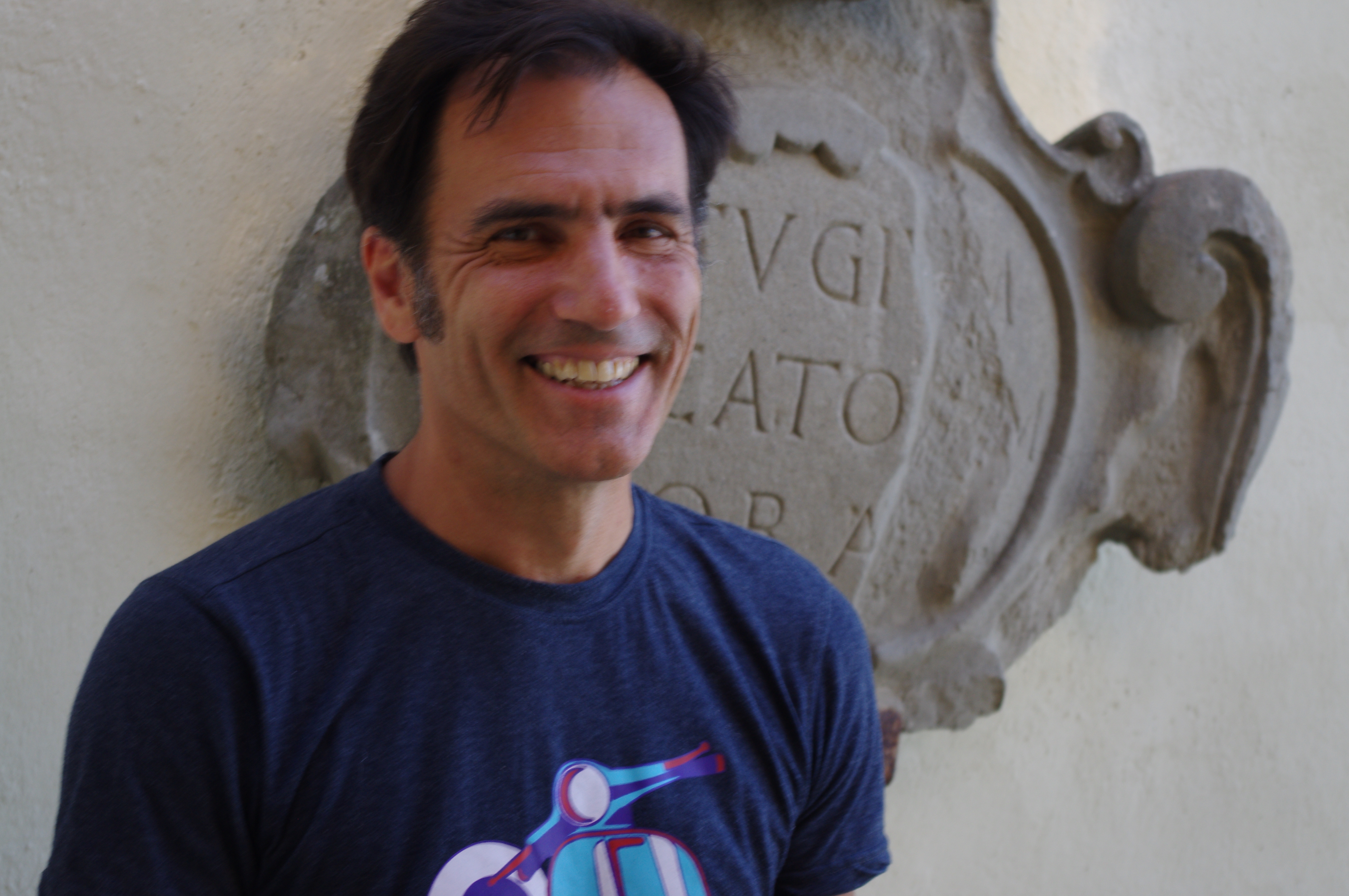
the author in Italy, 2012

== Biography ==
Carlos Rodrigues Gesualdi was born in Buenos Aires in 1963. After passing quickly through the Arts program of the University of Buenos Aires, he graduated in Philosophy. He worked as a professor and researcher in Medieval Philosophy and wrote with his friend Antonio Tursi the book Tres tratados Averroístas. Before writing "Raros Peinados", his big success, he lived in a national park in Venezuela, where he administered a jetty, and after "Palabra de Fantasma" he settled in Germany. There he wrote around 50 stories in three languages, which were published in collections and schoolbooks in different countries.

== Works ==
- "Das Abenteuer des wilden Flusses / Приключение дикой рекой", Hamburg, Amiguitos, 2015
- "Das Abenteuer des wilden Flusses / L‘Aventure de la Riviére Sauvage", Hamburg, Amiguitos, 2015
- "The Wild River Adventure / Das Abenteuer des wilden Flusses", Hamburg, Amiguitos, 2014 (Forewords: Phillip Köster)
- "Das Abenteuer des wilden Flusses / La aventura del Río Salvaje", Hamburg, Amiguitos, 2014 (Vorwort: Phillip Köster)
- The Supermodel / Das Top Model, Hamburg, Amiguitos, 2013.
- Das Top Model / La Modelo Top, Hamburg, Amiguitos, 2013.
- El misterio de Sevilla, Stuttgart, Schmetterling, 2011.
- Escándalo en Mallorca, Stuttgart, Schmetterling, 2011.
- Un amor en Madrid, Stuttgart, Schmetterling, 2010.
- Nuevos amigos en Barcelona, Stuttgart, Schmetterling, 2010.
- Golazo, Buenos Aires, SM (El Barco de Vapor), 2010.
- Una gata con todos los nombres del mundo, Quito, Libresa, 2009.
- Las aventuras de Centellerín, Madrid, Santillana 2008.
- Peces Gordos, Barcelona, Planeta 2007.
- El ángel de Cristina, Buenos Aires, Alfaguara 2006.
- Palabra de Fantasma, Buenos Aires, Alfaguara 1999.
- Raros Peinados, Buenos Aires, Alfaguara 1997.
