= Alberto Balestrini (fencer) =

Argentine fencer (born 1931)

Personal information
- Full name: Alberto Balestrini Bogino
- Born: 19 August 1931 (age 95) Córdoba, Argentina
- Height: 168 cm (5 ft 6 in)
- Weight: 61 kg (134 lb)

Sport
- Sport: Fencing
Medal record
Men's fencing
Representing Argentina
Pan American Games
Bronze medal – third place	1959 Chicago	Epée individual
Bronze medal – third place	1959 Chicago	Epée team
Bronze medal – third place	1963 São Paulo	Epée individual
Bronze medal – third place	1963 São Paulo	Epée team

Alberto Balestrini Bogino (Note: In this Spanish name, the first or paternal surname is Balestrini and the second or maternal family name is Bogino.) (born 19 August 1931) is an Argentine fencer. He competed at the 1960 and 1968 Summer Olympics.
