= Evaristo Avalos =

Mexican equestrian

Personal information
- Born: 24 December 1933 (age 91); Naranjo, Mexico

Sport
- Sport: Equestrian

Evaristo Avalos (born 24 December 1933) is a Mexican equestrian. He competed in two events at the 1968 Summer Olympics.
