= James Scanlon (equestrian) =

Australian equestrian (1948–2013)

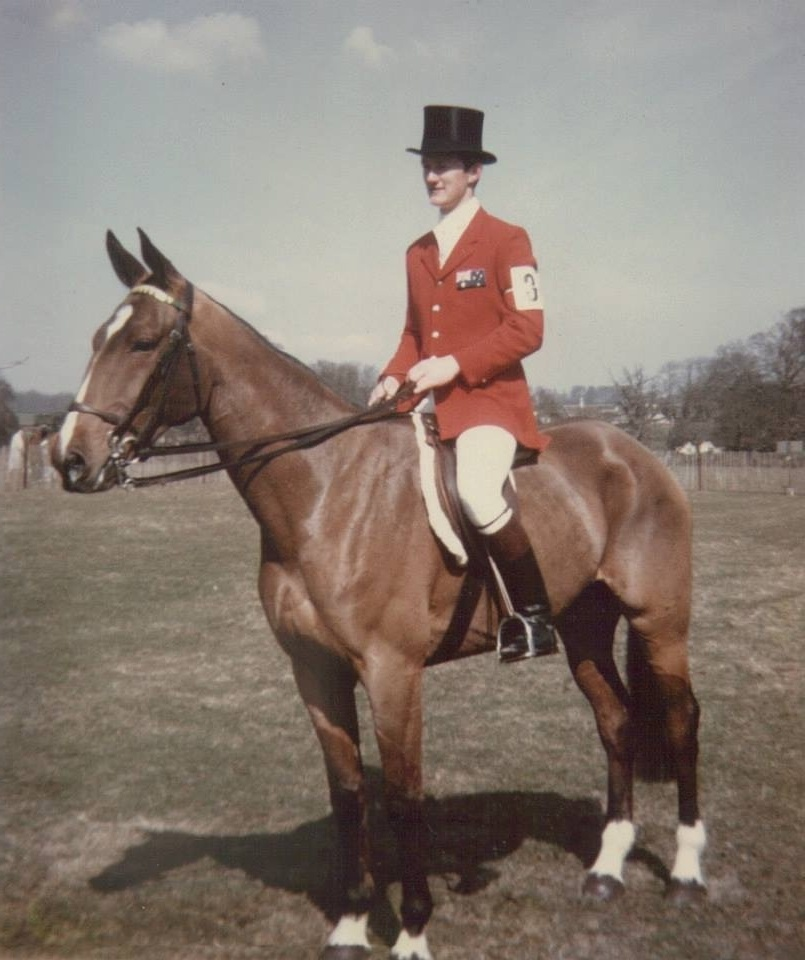

Personal information
- Nickname(s): Jim, Jimbo
- Nationality: Australian
- Born: 26 Jan 1948; Pakenham, Victoria, Australia
- Died: 20 June 2013; Geelong, Victoria, Australia

Sport
- Sport: Equestrian

James Scanlon (26 January 1948 – 20 June 2013) was an Australian equestrian. He competed in two events at the 1968 Summer Olympics. Achieving Bronze Medal in Team, open and 17th place in Individual, open riding Furtive.
