= Luis Schenone =

Argentine sailor

Personal information
- Born: 27 April 1940 (age 84); Buenos Aires, Argentina

Sport
- Sport: Sailing

Luis Schenone (born 27 April 1940) is an Argentine sailor. He competed at the 1960 Summer Olympics, the 1972 Summer Olympics and the 1975 Pan American Games
