= Helmut Hartmann =

German equestrian

Personal information
- Nationality: German
- Born: 2 February 1936 (age 89); Damme, Germany

Sport
- Sport: Equestrian

Helmut Hartmann (born 2 February 1936) is a German equestrian. He competed in two events at the 1968 Summer Olympics.
