= Ulrich Vite =

German equestrian

Personal information
- Nationality: German
- Born: 8 February 1944 (age 81); Wrocław, Poland

Sport
- Sport: Equestrian

Ulrich Vite (born 8 February 1944) is a German equestrian. He competed in two events at the 1968 Summer Olympics.
