= Michael Dasaro =

American businessman murdered in Moscow

Michael Dasaro (died November 13, 1993) was an American businessman who was murdered in Moscow, Russia near the American Embassy at the time. Dasaro was the first American citizen with direct ties to the embassy to be murdered since perestroika.

== Private life ==
After his death, the Moscow press stated that he was homosexual and frequented gay bars.

== Career ==
Dasaro graduated from Harvard University in 1981, where he focused on Russian studies.

In the late 1980s Dasaro was a contract employee in the economics section of the U.S. embassy in Moscow. President Boris Yeltsin had given him the title of "economic counselor".

Dasaro was employed by the International Finance Corporation, the commercial wing of the World Bank, where he focused on privatization initiatives for Russian industrial companies. He later joined the Accounting firm, Ernst & Young, where he worked for the two months prior to his death.

== Death ==
On November 13, 1993, Michael Dasaro was brutally murdered in his apartment in Moscow, near the American embassy. His murder, amidst a backdrop of rising organized crime in Russia, raised concerns about the safety of American citizens and the security of nuclear materials in the country. Dasaro was the first American citizen directly connected to the embassy to be murdered since perestroika began in the 1980's.

Dasaro's death, initially suspected to be a result of a heart attack by Moscow police, was later linked to organized crime. The circumstances of his murder, including the ransacking of his apartment and the possibility of a large sum of money being the motive, pointed towards a targeted crime. Additionally, rumors emerged suggesting his involvement in the underground gay community, adding complexity to the investigation. Despite conflicting reports and suspicions surrounding Dasaro's death, the U.S. State Department refrained from intervening in the Russian investigation, citing ongoing inquiries by Russian authorities.

Prior to his untimely death, Pavel Minashin, the director of the police security service, revealed that Dasaro had inquired about installing security devices in his residence. "Unfortunately," Minashin stated, "he deemed the cost of $500 for the installation of these devices to be excessive, and sadly, not long after, he met his demise."

== See also ==
- Shock Doctrine
