= Fionbarr Farrell =

Irish fencer (born 1945)

Personal information
- Born: 3 March 1945 (age 81) Dublin, Ireland

Sport
- Sport: Fencing

Fionbarr Farrell (born 3 March 1945) is an Irish épée, foil and sabre fencer. He competed in five events at the 1968 Summer Olympics.
