= Barry Sonshine =

Canadian equestrian (1948–2020)

Personal information
- Born: 1 February 1948; Toronto, Ontario, Canada
- Died: 13 December 2020 (aged 72); Toronto, Ontario, Canada

Sport
- Sport: Equestrian

Barry Sonshine (1 February 1948 – 13 December 2020) was a Canadian equestrian. He competed in two events at the 1968 Summer Olympics.
