= Francisco Serp =

Argentine fencer (1930–1960s)

Personal information
- Born: 19 April 1930 Buenos Aires, Argentina
- Died: late 1960s

Sport
- Sport: Fencing

Francisco Serp (19 April 1930 – late 1960s) was an Argentine fencer. He competed in the individual and team épée events at the 1964 Summer Olympics. Serp died in the late 1960s.
