= Jochen Mehrdorf =

German equestrian

Personal information
- Nationality: German
- Born: 14 July 1940 (age 84); Braunschweig, Germany

Sport
- Sport: Equestrian

Jochen Mehrdorf (born 14 July 1940) is a German equestrian. He competed in two events at the 1968 Summer Olympics.
