= Jean Sarrazin (equestrian) =

French equestrian (1934–1969)

Personal information
- Nationality: French
- Born: 5 February 1934; Saint-Nizier-le-Désert, France
- Died: 24 December 1969 (aged 35) near Saint-Nizier-le-Désert, France

Sport
- Sport: Equestrian

Jean Sarrazin (5 February 1934 – 24 December 1969) was a French equestrian. He competed in two events at the 1968 Summer Olympics. Sarrazin died in a car collision near Saint-Nizier-le-Désert, on 24 December 1969, at the age of 35.
