= Vicki Roycroft =

Australian equestrian (born 1953)

Personal information
- Full name: Victoria Roycroft
- Born: Victoria Rose; 17 April 1954 (age 72) Sydney, Australia
- Height: 166 cm (5 ft 5 in)
- Spouse: Wayne Roycroft (m. 1976–2000)

Sport
- Country: Australia
- Sport: Equestrian
- Updated on 27 March 2016

Victoria Roycroft (née Rose; born 17 April 1953) is an Australian equestrian who competed at three Olympic Games. She was born in Sydney. At the 1984 Games she competed in the three-day eventing, whereas at the 1988 and 1996 Games she competed in the show jumping. She also coached at the 1992 Games.

In 1987, Roycroft, on her horse Apache, won the Rome Grand Prix, the first Australian and first woman to do so.

She was married to fellow triple Olympian Wayne Roycroft from 1976 until their separation in 2000. The couple's son Mark died in 2003 at the age of 17 after being caught in a rip off Birdie Beach in the Munmorah State Conservation Area. On 15 April 2023, she reportedly had a heart attack while preparing for a show-jumping competition at the Sydney Royal Easter Show.

In 2000, she received an Australian Sports Medal.
