= Leonardo Baremboin =

Argentine swimmer

Personal information
- Born: 20 August 1950 (age 75) Buenos Aires, Argentina

Sport
- Sport: Swimming

Leonardo Baremboin (born 20 August 1950) is an Argentine former swimmer. He competed in three events at the 1968 Summer Olympics.
