= Alan Ehrlick =

Canadian equestrian

Personal information
- Born: 4 April 1946 (age 78); Toronto, Ontario, Canada

Sport
- Sport: Equestrian

Alan Ehrlick (born 4 April 1946) is a Canadian equestrian. He competed in two events at the 1968 Summer Olympics.
