= Adolfo Bisellach =

Argentine fencer

Personal information
- Born: 13 May 1942 (age 84) Rosario, Santa Fe, Argentina

Sport
- Sport: Fencing

Adolfo Bisellach (born 13 May 1942) is an Argentine fencer. He competed in the individual and team foil events at the 1964 Summer Olympics.
