= Uwe Plank =

German equestrian

Personal information
- Nationality: German
- Born: 16 December 1939 (age 85); Thielbeer, Germany

Sport
- Sport: Equestrian

Uwe Plank (born 16 December 1939) is a German equestrian. He competed in two events at the 1968 Summer Olympics.
