= Aleksandr Yevdokimov =

Soviet equestrian

Personal information
- Nationality: Soviet
- Born: 5 April 1947 (age 79) Mary, Turkmenistan

Sport
- Sport: Equestrian
Medal record
Equestrian
Representing the Soviet Union
European Championships
| Gold medal – first place | 1965 Moscow | Team eventing |
| Gold medal – first place | 1973 Kiev | Individual eventing |
| Silver medal – second place | 1969 Haras-du-Pin | Team eventing |
| Silver medal – second place | 1971 Burghley | Team eventing |
| Silver medal – second place | 1973 Kiev | Team eventing |

Aleksandr Yevdokimov (born 5 April 1947) is a Soviet equestrian. He competed in two events at the 1968 Summer Olympics.
