= André Le Goupil =

French equestrian (1931–2023)

Personal information
- Nationality: French
- Born: 7 January 1931; Martinvast, France
- Died: 17 February 2023 (aged 92)

Sport
- Sport: Equestrian

André Le Goupil (7 January 1931 – 17 February 2023) was a French equestrian. He competed in two events at the 1968 Summer Olympics in. Mexico City.

Le Goupil died on 17 February 2023, at the age of 92.
