= Masanori Katsumoto =

Japanese equestrian

Personal information
- Nationality: Japanese
- Born: 18 September 1933 (age 91)

Sport
- Sport: Equestrian

Masanori Katsumoto (born 18 September 1933) is a Japanese equestrian. He competed in two events at the 1964 Summer Olympics.
