= Nelson Torno =

Argentine sports shooter

Personal information
- Born: 10 November 1927 Buenos Aires, Argentina
- Died: 4 January 2015 (aged 87)

Sport
- Sport: Sports shooting

Nelson Torno (10 November 1927 – 4 January 2015) was an Argentine sports shooter. He competed at the 1968 Summer Olympics and the 1972 Summer Olympics.
