= Ernesto del Castillo =

Mexican equestrian (1929–2019)

Personal information
- Born: 21 November 1929; Tuxpan, Mexico
- Died: 3 January 2019 (aged 89); Delicias, Chihuahua, Mexico

Sport
- Sport: Equestrian

Ernesto del Castillo Ontiveros (21 November 1929 – 3 January 2019) was a Mexican equestrian. He competed in two events at the 1968 Summer Olympics.
