= Pedro Sisti =

Argentine sailor

Personal information
- Born: 1 August 1931 Buenos Aires, Argentina
- Died: 24 November 2017 (aged 86)

Sport
- Sport: Sailing

Pedro Oscar Sisti (1 August 1931 – 24 November 2017) was an Argentine sailor. He competed at the 1968 Summer Olympics and the 1972 Summer Olympics. He was argentinian national champion in the Grumete (1963, 1964 and 1965) and Snipe (1976 and 1978) classes.
