= Svetozar Glushkov =

Russian equestrian

Personal information
- Nationality: Russian
- Born: 23 November 1939 (age 85); Slavgorod, Russia

Sport
- Sport: Equestrian

Svetozar Glushkov (born 23 November 1939) is a Russian equestrian. He competed in two events at the 1968 Summer Olympics.
