= Jesús Taboada =

Argentine fencer

Personal information
- Born: 12 July 1940 (age 86)

Sport
- Sport: Fencing

Jesús Taboada (born 12 July 1940) is an Argentine fencer. He competed in the team and individual foil and épée events at the 1964 Summer Olympics.
