= Rubén Placanica =

Argentine cyclist (1943–2022)

Rubén Placánica
Personal information
- Born: 27 July 1943 Saavedra, Buenos Aires, Argentina
- Died: 14 September 2022 (aged 79) Buenos Aires, Argentina

Cycling career
- Sport: Cycling

Rubén Placánica (27 July 1943 – 14 September 2022) was an Argentine cyclist.

== Biography ==
He competed in the individual road race and team time trial events at the 1964 Summer Olympics.

Placánica died from COVID-19 on 14 September 2022, at the age of 79.
