= Adriana Comolli =

Argentine swimmer

Personal information
- Born: 15 December 1951 (age 74) Rosario, Santa Fe, Argentina

Sport
- Sport: Swimming

Adriana Comolli (born 15 December 1951) is an Argentine former swimmer. She competed in the women's 100 metre backstroke and women's 100 metre butterfly events at the 1968 Summer Olympics.
