= Miguel Angel Navarro (Argentine swimmer) =

Argentine swimmer

Personal information
- Born: 12 October 1941 (age 84)

Sport
- Sport: Swimming

Miguel Angel Navarro (born 12 October 1941) is an Argentine former swimmer. He competed in two events at the 1964 Summer Olympics.
