= Masaki Matsudaira =

Japanese equestrian

Personal information
- Nationality: Japanese
- Born: 10 January 1943 (age 82)

Sport
- Sport: Equestrian

Masaki Matsudaira (born 10 January 1943) is a Japanese equestrian. He competed in two events at the 1964 Summer Olympics.
