= John Harty (equestrian) =

Irish equestrian

Personal information
- Nationality: Irish
- Born: 9 March 1941
- Died: December 1990 (aged 49)

Sport
- Sport: Equestrian

John Harty (9 March 1941 – December 1990) was an Irish equestrian. He competed in two events at the 1964 Summer Olympics.
