= Ludwig Gössing =

German equestrian (1938–2026)

Medal record

Equestrian

Representing West Germany

Olympic Games
Bronze medal – third place	1972 Munich	Team eventing

Ludwig "Lutz" Gössing (13 May 1938 – 27 September 2026) was a German equestrian and Olympic medalist.

== Biography ==
Gössing was born in Dortmund on 13 May 1938. He competed in eventing at the 1972 Summer Olympics in Munich, and won a bronze medal with the German team.

Ludwig Gössing died on 27 September 2026, at the age of 88.
