= Roberto Breppe =

Argentine cyclist

Personal information
- Born: 4 February 1941 (age 85) Paraná, Entre Ríos, Argentina

Cycling career
- Sport: Cycling

Roberto Florencio Breppe Sokosoppi (born 4 February 1941) is a former Argentine cyclist. He competed at the 1964, 1968 and 1972 Summer Olympics. In December 2004, he was named a Citizen of Honor in his hometown of Paraná, Entre Ríos.
