= Jean-Louis Martin (equestrian) =

French equestrian

Personal information
- Nationality: French
- Born: 24 August 1939 Landes, France
- Died: 19 June 2022 (aged 82)

Sport
- Sport: Equestrian

Jean-Louis Martin (24 August 1939 – 19 June 2022) was a French equestrian. He competed in two events at the 1968 Summer Olympics.
