= Wayne Roycroft =

Australian equestrian (born 1946)

Personal information
- Full name: Wayne William Roycroft
- Nationality: Australian
- Born: 21 May 1946 (age 80) Mansfield, Victoria, Australia
- Spouse: Vicki Roycroft (m. 1976–2000)
Medal record
Equestrian
Representing Australia
Olympic Games
Bronze medal – third place	1968 Mexico City	Team eventing
Bronze medal – third place	1976 Montreal	Team eventing
World Championships
Bronze medal – third place	1986 Gawler	Team eventing

Wayne William Roycroft, AM (born 21 May 1946) is an Australian equestrian and coach who won two bronze medals at three Olympics. He was the national eventing coach from 1988 to 2010; Australia won four team and two individual medals in the sport during his reign.

== Biography ==
Roycroft was born in 1946 as the second of three sons to Bill Roycroft, an Olympic equestrian gold medallist, and his wife, Mavis. He won bronze medals in team eventing at the 1968 Mexico City and 1976 Montreal Olympics, competing alongside his father at both the games. He was selected for the 1980 Moscow Olympics but was affected by the boycott of the games. He was the Australian flag bearer at the 1984 Los Angeles Olympics; his father had done the same thing 16 years previously. He coached the Australian eventing team from 1988 to 2010, taking up the role from his father. his first Olympics as a coach were the 1988 Seoul Games; under his reign the eventing team won gold medals at the 1992 Barcelona, 1996 Atlanta, and 2000 Sydney Olympics and a silver medal at the 2008 Beijing games, and Matthew Ryan won an individual gold medal in 1992 and Andrew Hoy won an individual silver medal in 2000. He was chairman of the International Federation for Equestrian Sports Eventing Committee from 2000 to 2009, and also served as chair of Equestrian New South Wales and Equestrian Australia. He is nicknamed "Patch".

In 1976 he married Vicki Rose, who went on to have an Olympic equestrian career of her own, and retired from equestrian competition shortly after the birth of the couple's son, Mark, in 1986. The couple separated in 2000 and Mark died in 2003 at the age of 17 after being caught in a rip off Birdie Beach in the Munmorah State Conservation Area.

== Recognition ==
Roycroft was inducted into the Sport Australia Hall of Fame in 1997 and the Equestrian Australia Hall of Fame in 2011. In 2000, he received an Australian Sports Medal. He was made a Member of the Order of Australia in 2014.
