= Kilkenny (horse) =

Event horse

- Breed: Irish Sport Horse
- Dam: Laughter
- Maternal grandsire: Sandeman
- Sex: 17.0hh Gelding
- Foaled: 1957 in Ireland
- Country: United States and Ireland
- Colour: Bay with a small star
- Breeder: William Dempsey
- Owner: Dorothea B. Wofford

Medal record

Equestrian

Olympic Games
Silver medal – second place	1968 Mexico City	Team 3-Day Event
Silver medal – second place	1972 Munich	Team 3-Day Event

World Championships
Gold medal – first place	1966 Burghley	Team eventing
Bronze medal – third place	1970 Punchtown	Team eventing

Pan American Games
Gold medal – first place	1967 Winnipeg	Team eventing

Kilkenny was a horse that competed in the sport of eventing.

== Competitive career ==
Kilkenny was named after the area in which he was bred – County Kilkenny, Ireland. His breeder was William Dempsey of Ballyhale. Kilkenny was first ridden by an Irish rider, Tommy Brennan, with whom he competed at the 1964 Badminton Horse Trials and in the 1964 Tokyo Olympics. In 1965, he turned briefly to show jumping, becoming a member of the Irish Show Jumping Team and competing at the Rotterdam CSI, jumping 6'7" in a puissance class. He was ridden again in the 1966 Badminton Horse Trials and then at the 1966 Eventing World Championship at Burghley, where he won team gold. Wofford saw the horse running at the World Championships and was impressed by his bravery. His mother purchased Kilkenny that winter, and gave Wofford the ride.

Under Wofford, Kilkenny continued to have great success, first winning the 1967 USET Nationals, before earning the team gold at the Pan-American Games and finishing 4th individually. In 1968, the pair competed at Badminton for a third time, placing 13th. A few months later they finished 8th at the Canadian Championships, before shipping off to the 1968 Olympics.

The Olympics was a success, earning a team silver medal for the Americans. However, a broken caulk in the show jumping resulted in a fall, and disappointedly dropped the pair from second individually down to sixth.

The pair continued finishing well, placing 3rd at the 1969 USET Championships, and winning the bronze medal at the 1970 World Championships in Puncheston. In 1971, Kilkenny finished third at the Canadian Championships, and finished his competitive career at the 1972 Olympic Games, with a team silver medal.

Following his third Olympics, Kilkenny was retired at Ledyard, and carried Wofford out fox hunting for 6 years.

== Accomplishments ==
- One of only three horses (including The Grasshopper and Paket) to compete in three Olympics
- Winner of 2 team gold medals, 2 team silver medals, 1 individual bronze, and a National Championship
- Competed in 4 CCI***s and an amazing 9 CCI****s
- One of only five event horses to have competed in six or more CCIOs (International Team Competitions), in addition to The Grasshopper, The Poacher, Random Light, and Priceless.
- At 3 of the CCIO****s, he finished with the fastest cross-country time (including the 1968 Olympics, where he finished an amazing 30 seconds ahead of the second-fastest)
- Completed every CCI he every started
