= Kim Mun-sik =

South Korean equestrian

Personal information
- Nationality: South Korean
- Born: 1 December 1928

Sport
- Sport: Equestrian

Kim Mun-sik (Kim Moon-shik, born 1 December 1928) was a South Korean equestrian. He competed in two events at the 1964 Summer Olympics.
