= James Templer (British Army officer, born 1936) =

British equestrian (1936–2023)

Major-General James Templer CB OBE
- Born: James Robert Templer; 8 January 1936; Exeter, England
- Died: 14 December 2023 (aged 87)
- Sports career
- Nationality: British
- Sport: Equestrian
Medal record
Equestrian
Representing Great Britain
European Championships
Gold medal – first place	1962 Burghley	Individual eventing

Major-General James Robert Templer, CB, OBE (8 January 1936 – 14 December 2023) was a British Army officer and equestrian.

Educated at Charterhouse and Sandhurst, Templer was commissioned into the Royal Artillery in 1955 and became Assistant Chief of the Defence Staff.

He won the European 3-Day Championship at Burghley in 1962, the International Trials at Munich in 1963 and Badminton in 1964.

Templer competed in two events at the 1964 Summer Olympics on a horse called M’Lord Connolly.

Templer died from complications of Alzheimer's disease on 14 December 2023, at the age of 87.
