= Jean de Croutte de Saint Martin =

French equestrian

Personal information
- Nationality: French
- Born: 16 September 1932
- Died: 7 May 2015 (aged 82)

Sport
- Sport: Equestrian

Jean de Croutte de Saint Martin (16 September 1932 – 7 May 2015) was a French equestrian. He competed in two events at the 1964 Summer Olympics.
