= John Kelly (equestrian) =

Australian equestrian

Personal information
- Full name: John Wilson Kelly
- Nationality: Australian
- Born: 10 July 1925
- Died: 28 November 2004 (aged 79)

Sport
- Sport: Equestrian

John Kelly (10 July 1925 – 28 November 2004) was an Australian equestrian. He competed in two events at the 1964 Summer Olympics.
