= Ramón Mejía =

Mexican equestrian

Personal information
- Born: 31 August 1943 (age 81); Guerrero Negro, Mexico

Sport
- Sport: Equestrian

Ramón Mejía (born 31 August 1943) is a Mexican equestrian. He competed at the 1968 Summer Olympics and the 1972 Summer Olympics.
