= José González (equestrian) =

Mexican equestrian (1917–1988)

Personal information
- Nationality: Mexican
- Born: 4 July 1917
- Died: 18 December 1988 (aged 71) Miguel Hidalgo, Mexico City, Mexico

Sport
- Sport: Equestrian
Medal record
Equestrian
Representing Mexico
Pan American Games
| Gold medal – first place | 1955 Mexico City | Team eventing |

José Refugio González Cabrera (4 July 1917 – 18 December 1988) was a Mexican equestrian. He competed in two events at the 1964 Summer Olympics.
