= Avándaro Golf Club =

Golf course in Valle de Bravo, Mexico

Coordinates: 19°9′34″N 100°7′53″W

Avándaro Golf Club (Spanish: Club de Golf Avandaro) is a golf course located in the Valle de Bravo state of Mexico. Located 110 mi (180 km) west of Mexico City, it hosted the eventing portion of the equestrian competition for the 1968 Summer Olympics.

During the 1968 Games, the club had stables for 120 horses to have the event on the course and the neighboring countryside.

== See also ==
- Festival Rock y Ruedas de Avándaro
