= Jo Hyeong-won =

South Korean equestrian

Personal information
- Native name: 조형원
- Nationality: South Korean
- Born: 12 July 1936 (age 88)

Sport
- Sport: Equestrian

Jo Hyeong-won (Korean: 조형원, also transliterated Cho Hyung-won, born 12 July 1936) is a South Korean equestrian. He competed in two events at the 1964 Summer Olympics.
