= Seo Myeong-won (equestrian) =

South Korean equestrian

Personal information
- Nationality: South Korean
- Born: 29 September 1936 (age 88)

Sport
- Sport: Equestrian

Seo Myeong-won (born 29 September 1936) is a South Korean equestrian. He competed in two events at the 1964 Summer Olympics.
