= Paolo Angioni =

Italian equestrian (1938–2025)

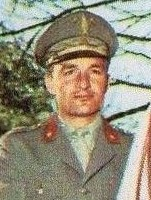
- Angioni in 1968

Personal information
- Nationality: Italian
- Born: 22 January 1938 Cagliari, Italy
- Died: 17 August 2025 (aged 87)
- Height: 1.77 m (5 ft 10 in)
- Weight: 64 kg (141 lb)

Sport
- Sport: Equestrianism
- Event: Eventing
- Club: CEPIM Passo Corese
Medal record
Representing Italy
Olympic Games
Gold medal – first place	1964 Tokyo	Eventing, team

Paolo Angioni (22 January 1938 – 17 August 2025) was an Italian equestrian and Olympic champion. He competed in the mixed three-day eventing, individual and team, at the 1964 and 1968 Olympics and won a team gold medal in 1964. In 1966, Angioni was crushed by his horse at a competition in Poland. He went into a coma, but recovered and continued to compete. In retirement he wrote several books on equestrian history and techniques.

Angioni died on 17 August 2025, at the age of 87.

== Achievements ==
Year	Competition	Venue	Position	Event	Notes
1964	Olympic Games	(Japan) Tokyo	11th	Individual eventing	
1964	Olympic Games	(Japan) Tokyo	1st	Team eventing	
