= Rikutoshi Maeda =

Japanese equestrian

Personal information
- Nationality: Japanese
- Born: 17 February 1931

Sport
- Sport: Equestrian

Rikutoshi Maeda (born 17 February 1931) is a Japanese equestrian. He competed in two events at the 1964 Summer Olympics.
