= Hugues Landon =

French equestrian (1930–2024)

Personal information
- Nationality: French
- Born: 26 June 1930 Cher, France
- Died: 21 July 2024 (aged 94) Yvelines, France

Sport
- Sport: Equestrian
Medal record
Equestrian
Representing France
European Championships
Bronze medal – third place	1959 Harewood	Team eventing

Hugues Landon (26 June 1930 – 21 July 2024) was a French equestrian. He competed in two events at the 1964 Summer Olympics. Landon died in Yvelines on 21 July 2024, at the age of 94.
