= Robin Hahn =

Canadian equestrian (1933–2021)

Personal information
- Born: 19 July 1933; Regina, Saskatchewan, Canada
- Died: 14 August 2021 (aged 88); Dauphin, Manitoba, Canada

Sport
- Sport: Equestrian

Robin Hahn (19 July 1933 – 14 August 2021) was a Canadian equestrian. He competed at the 1968 Summer Olympics, the 1972 Summer Olympics and the 1976 Summer Olympics.
