= Diana Willson =

Irish equestrian (born 1934)

Personal information
- Nationality: Irish
- Born: 12 March 1934 (age 92) Northampton, England

Sport
- Sport: Equestrian
Medal record
Equestrian
Representing Ireland
European Championships
Bronze medal – third place	1971 Burghley	Team eventing

Diana Willson (born 12 March 1934) is an Irish equestrian. She competed in two events at the 1968 Summer Olympics.
