= Julián Velásquez =

Argentine fencer (born 1920)

Julián Velázquez
Personal information
- Born: 7 December 1920 Rosario, Santa Fè, Argentina

Sport
- Sport: Fencing

Julián Velásquez (born 7 December 1920) was an Argentine fencer. He competed in the team sabre event at the 1964 Summer Olympics.
