= Julio Henri =

Argentine equestrian

Personal information
- Nationality: Argentine
- Born: 11 March 1933
- Died: 5 June 2016 (aged 83)

Sport
- Sport: Equestrian

Julio Henri (11 March 1933 – 5 June 2016) was an Argentine equestrian. He competed in two events at the 1964 Summer Olympics.
