= Jorge Bedoya =

Argentine equestrian

Jorge Bedoya Guido
Personal information
- Born: 24 November 1929 Buenos Aires, Argentina
- Died: 30 November 2001 (aged 72)

Sport
- Sport: Equestrian

Jorge Bedoya (24 November 1929 – 30 November 2001) was an Argentine equestrian. He competed in two events at the 1968 Summer Olympics.
