= James C. Wofford =

American equestrian (1944–2023)

Personal information
- Full name: James Cunningham Wofford
- Born: November 3, 1944 Junction City, Kansas, U.S.
- Died: February 2, 2023 (aged 78) Middleburg, Virginia, U.S.
Medal record
Equestrian
Representing the United States
Olympic Games
Silver medal – second place	1968 Mexico City	Team three-day event
Silver medal – second place	1972 Munich	Team three-day event
Pan American Games
Gold medal – first place	1967 Winnipeg	Team eventing
World Championships
Bronze medal – third place	1970 Punchestown	Individual eventing
Bronze medal – third place	1978 Lexington	Team eventing

James Cunningham Wofford (November 3, 1944 – February 2, 2023) was an American equestrian who competed in many international competitions in the sport of eventing. He was most known as a trainer of both horses and riders, and as a retired president of the AHSA and vice-president of the USET.

== Early life and education ==
Wofford was born in Junction City, Kansas, to an equestrian family. His father Col. John W. Wofford, who died when James was 10, rode for the United States Show Jumping Team in the 1932 Los Angeles Olympic Games. Col. Wofford went on to coach eventers and show jumpers at the 1952 Helsinki Olympic Games. This was the first Olympics where civilians were permitted to participate in eventing, and nineteen-year-old Jeb Wofford—Col. Wofford's son and James’ brother—won a bronze medal. Col. Wofford was also the founder and first president of the United States Equestrian Team.

Wofford attended Culver Military Academy for high school. He later went on to graduate from the University of Colorado Boulder in the school of business.

== Riding career ==
Wofford has had a successful riding career, joining the USA Eventing Team in 1965 and remaining a member until 1985. During this time, he trained under Bert de Nemethy and Jack Le Goff.

Wofford competed in the 1968 and 1972 Olympic Games on his famous horse Kilkenny, winning team silver both times, and was also named to the 1980 Olympic Games but did not compete due to the Olympic Committee's boycott of the 1980 Summer Olympics. He was one of 461 athletes to receive a Congressional Gold Medal many years after. He also competed on the US Eventing Team at the 1970 World Championships at Punchestown, Ireland, winning an individual bronze with Kilkenny, and at the 1978 World Championship with Carawich, winning a team bronze.

Wofford's records also include five wins—each on a different horse—at five US National Championships, a team gold medal at the 1967 Pan Am Games, and two wins at the Rolex Kentucky Three Day (1981 with Carawich and 1986 with The Optimist —remarkably coming out of retirement to ride the horse for student and fellow Olympian, Karen O'Connor). He also competed very successfully abroad from 1959 to 1986. In all, Wofford competed at the advanced level over 20 years. During this time, he also raced as a steeplechase jockey, and fox hunted for over 20 years.

Wofford retired as a competitor in 1986. He continued to ride, along with his wife, two daughters, and three grandsons.

== Coaching career ==
Perhaps even more impressive than his riding career is his career as a coach. Wofford began focusing on coaching after his retirement, and has produced riders on nearly every USET Eventing team. He has had at least one student on every US Olympic, World Championship, or Pan Am team since 1978. He was sought after as a clinician.

Notable record of his achievements as a coach include:

- 2004 Athens Olympics: Kimberly Severson and John Williams were both former students. Severson went on to win the individual silver. The team won bronze. Also coached the Canadian team.
- 2003 Pan Am Games, as coach for the silver medal-winning Canadian team.
- 2002 World Equestrian Games in Jerez, Spain, where he coached the Canadian team. The gold medal US team also had former students Kim Vinoski-Severson, David O'Connor and John Williams.
- 2000 Sydney Olympics, where all four US team members—David O'Connor, Karen O'Connor, Nina Fout and Linden Wiesman—had trained with Wofford. David O’Connor went on to win the individual gold medal, and the team won bronze.
- Wofford was named United States Olympic Committee development coach of the year in 1998 and 1999.

== Other involvements ==
James Wofford has written a number of books, including Gymnastics: Systematic Training for Jumping Horses, and Training the Three-Day Event Horse and Rider, 101 Eventing Tips, and Take a Good Look Around. He has also served on many equestrian committees, including:

- AHSA (now USEF) as president
- USET: the first vice-president
- USCTA (now USEA) secretary
- Member of the FEI Eventing Committee for two terms, including two years as vice-chairman
- He did many clinics all over the US

Wofford has also been inducted into the US Eventing Hall of Fame and the Culver Academies Horsemanship Hall of Fame.

== Personal life ==
The second brother to James, Warren Wofford, remains the only USET rider to qualify in both show jumping and eventing. He chose show jumping, but only went as an alternate to the 1956 Stockholm Games. However, Warren did meet his future wife, Dawn Penelope Wofford, who competed on the British Show Jumping Team in the 1956 and 1960 Olympic Games.

Wofford's cousin is both a trainer and rider of flat and steeplechase races. Several members of his family have also been Masters of Foxhounds.

Wofford lived on his Fox Covert Farm in Upperville, Virginia, with his wife, Gail W. Wofford ex-MFH, of almost 40 years until his death.

=== Death ===
Wofford died on February 2, 2023, at the age of 78.
