= Juliet Jobling-Purser =

Irish equestrian

Personal information
- Nationality: Irish
- Born: 2 March 1943 (age 82); Newcastle upon Tyne, England

Sport
- Sport: Equestrian

Juliet Jobling-Purser (born 2 March 1943) is an Irish equestrian. She competed in two events at the 1968 Summer Olympics.
