= Kim Yeong-ro =

South Korean equestrian

Personal information
- Nationality: South Korean
- Born: 28 May 1929

Sport
- Sport: Equestrian

Kim Yeong-ro (Kim Young-ro, born 28 May 1929) was a South Korean equestrian. He competed in two events at the 1964 Summer Olympics.
