= Jean-Jacques Guyon =

French equestrian

Personal information
- Born: 21 December 1932 Paris, France
- Died: 20 December 2017 (aged 84) Paris, France
Medal record
Equestrian
Representing France
Olympic Games
Gold medal – first place	1968 Mexico City	Individual eventing
European Championships
Bronze medal – third place	1967 Punchestown	Team eventing

Jean-Jacques Guyon (21 December 1932 – 20 December 2017) was a French equestrian and Olympic champion from Paris. He won an individual gold medal in eventing at the 1968 Summer Olympics in Mexico City.
