= José Eugenio Acosta =

Argentine equestrian

Personal information
- Born: 17 August 1943; Buenos Aires, Argentina
- Died: 31 July 2006 (aged 62)
- Height: 1.73 m (5 ft 8 in)
- Weight: 73 kg (161 lb)

Sport
- Sport: Equestrian

José Eugenio Acosta (17 August 1942 – 31 July 2006) was an Argentine equestrian. He competed in the 1968 and 1972 Summer Olympics.
