= Bill Roycroft =

Australian equestrian (1915–2011)

Bill Roycroft OBE
Personal information
- Born: James William George Roycroft; 17 March 1915
- Died: 29 May 2011 (aged 96)
Medal record
Equestrian
Representing Australia
Olympic Games
Gold medal – first place	1960 Rome	Team event
Bronze medal – third place	1968 Mexico City	Team event
Bronze medal – third place	1976 Montreal	Team event

James William George Roycroft, OBE (17 March 1915 – 29 May 2011) was an Australian Olympic equestrian champion. He grew up on a dairy farm and learnt to ride horses there. After serving in the army in World War II, he moved with his family to a soldier's block in western Victoria near Camperdown, where he raised his three sons, all of whom went on to compete alongside their father in the Olympics. At his first Olympics, the 1960 Rome Games, he played a key role on the final day of the team three-day event, despite being thrown off his horse the day before, allowing Australia to win the gold medal in the competition. He went on to compete in four more Olympics from 1964 to 1976, winning bronze medals in team eventing at the 1968 Mexico City and 1976 Montreal Games. He later served as coach of the Australian eventing team.

== Biography ==
Roycroft was born as one of seven children on 17 March 1915 in Melbourne and grew up in Flowerdale. His parents ploughed with horses in their dairy farm. Roycroft rode throughout his childhood, racing his horses over tree branches with his friend Lawrence Morgan, later an Olympic equestrian competitor.

At about the age of fourteen he left school and moved with his mother and father's brother to New South Wales, where he was a messenger for the Water Commission in Leeton and later a sharecropper. He then moved back to Flowerdale, where he did odd jobs on local farms while competing in riding.

While in Flowerdale he met Mavis Jones, a show jumper. He signed up as a soldier when World War II broke out, and married Mavis during his first substantial leave from duty. After the war, they moved with their son Barry (born 1944) to a 200-hectare (500-acre) soldier's block near Camperdown in western Victoria, where they set up a dairy farm. The couple had two further sons, Wayne (born 1946) and Clarke (born 1950). Roycroft trained them in riding from an early age while Mavis would select the horses. They also went on to compete in Olympic equestrian events alongside their father – Barry in 1964 (as a reserve rider), 1976, and 1988; Wayne in 1968, 1976, and 1984; and Clarke in 1972. Wayne's wife, Vicki, also competed in equestrian at the Olympics. Mavis died on 17 August 2007 at the age of 86.

As part of the Australian team's preparation for the 1960 Rome Olympics, they took part in the Badminton Horse Trials, and Roycroft was the first Australian to win the individual three-day event there. At the team three-day event at the Olympics, he was thrown from his horse and received a broken shoulder, a dislocated collarbone, and concussion. He completed the cross-country section, and was then airlifted to hospital. The eventing team needed three rider–horse combinations to finish the competition, but only had two remaining (excluding Roycroft) because one of their horses was unable to ride. Consequently, Roycroft left his hospital bed against his doctors' advice to finish the event the next day, allowing his team to win the gold medal. He competed at the next four Olympics, winning bronze medals in the team events at the 1968 Mexico City and 1976 Montreal Games, alongside his son Wayne. He and Wayne were the first father–son combination to win a medal together. At the 1976 Games, he became Australia's oldest Olympic competitor at the age of 61.

He was the Australian flag bearer at the 1968 Mexico City Olympics; Wayne would do the same thing 16 years later. He was also the equestrian team manager at the 1980 Moscow Olympics and later the national coach of the Australian eventing team; Wayne succeeded him in the latter role. He was one of eight Australian flag-bearers of the Olympic flag at the opening ceremony of the 2000 Summer Olympics in Sydney.

Roycroft died in hospital at Camperdown on 29 May 2011, aged 96. At the time of his death, he was Australia's oldest surviving Olympian, having assumed that mantle at the death of shooter Neville Holt in 2008.

== Recognition ==
Roycroft was made an Officer of the Order of the British Empire (OBE) in the 1969 New Year Honours for services in Sporting and International Spheres, and received an Order of Merit from the Australian Olympic Committee in 1978. In 1985 he was inducted into the Sport Australia Hall of Fame and was upgraded to legend status in 1996. He received an Australian Sports Medal in 2000 and a Centenary Medal in 2001. In 2011 he was inducted into the Equestrian Australia Hall of Fame.
