= Roberto Pistarini =

Argentine equestrian

Personal information
- Full name: Roberto Pasqual Pistarini
- Born: 28 April 1948 (age 78) Buenos Aires, Argentina

Sport
- Sport: Equestrian
Medal record
Equestrian
Representing Argentina
World Championships
Silver medal – second place	1966 Burghley	Team eventing

Roberto Pasqual Pistarini (born 28 April 1948) is an Argentine equestrian. He competed in two events at the 1968 Summer Olympics.
