= Penelope Moreton =

Irish equestrian (1932–2025)

Personal information
- Nationality: Irish
- Born: 23 March 1932 Staffordshire, England
- Died: 13 December 2025 (aged 93) Dublin, Ireland

Sport
- Sport: Equestrian
Medal record
Equestrian
Representing Ireland
World Championships
Gold medal – first place	1966 Burghley	Team eventing
European Championships
Silver medal – second place	1965 Moscow	Team eventing

Penelope Moreton (23 March 1932 – 13 December 2025) was an Irish equestrian. She competed in two events at the 1968 Summer Olympics. She died on 13 December 2025, at the age of 93.
