= Elvio Flores =

Argentine equestrian

Personal information
- Nationality: Argentine
- Born: 26 October 1933 Neuquén, Argentina
- Died: 7 September 1996 (aged 62)

Sport
- Sport: Equestrian

Elvio Flores (26 October 1933 – 7 September 1996) was an Argentine equestrian. He competed in two events at the 1964 Summer Olympics.
