= Thomas Brennan (equestrian) =

Irish equestrian

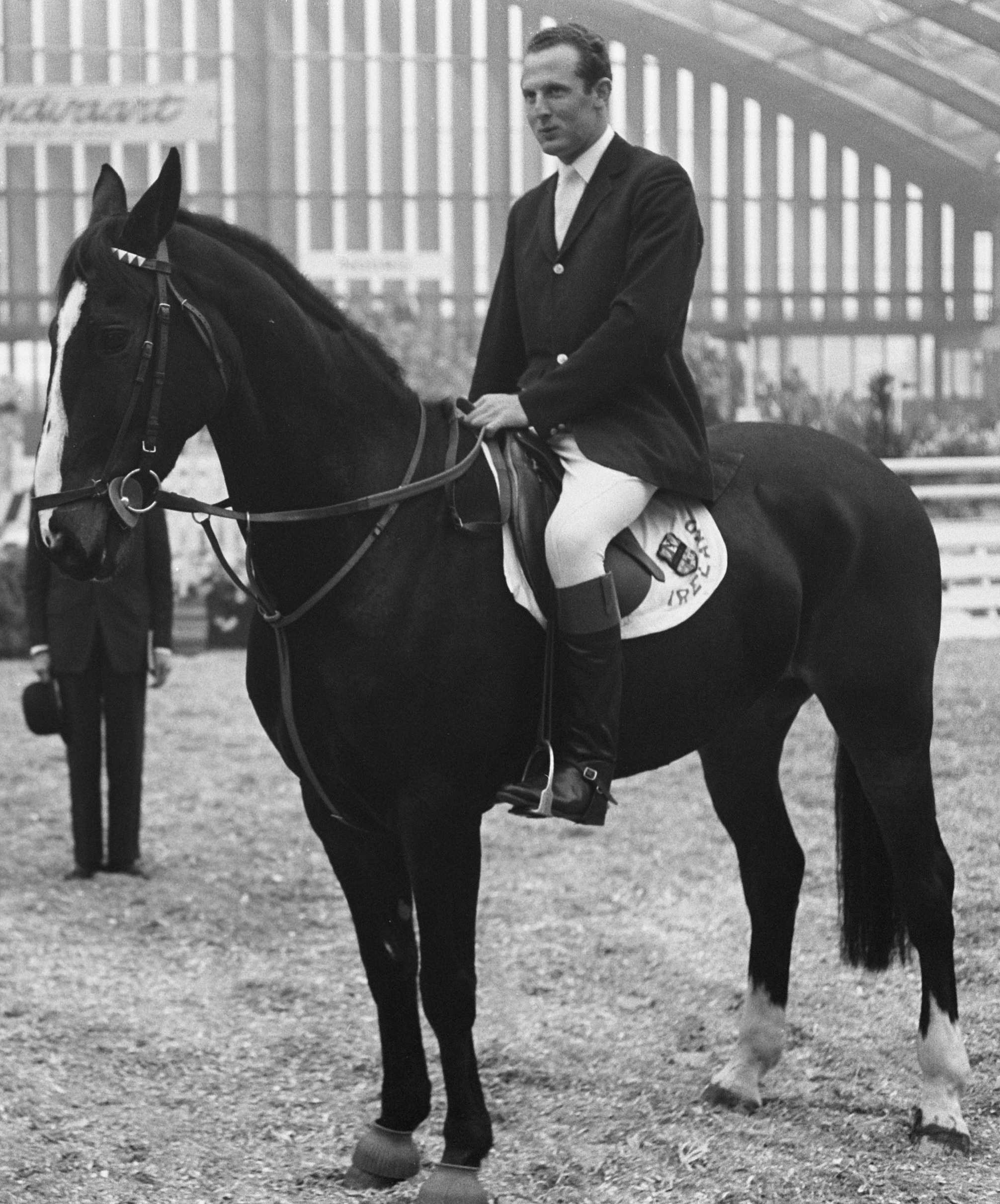
- Thomas Brennan at Jumping Amsterdam 1962, which he won

Personal information
- Nickname: TB
- Born: 29 January 1940 Kilkenny, Ireland
- Died: 20 July 2014 (aged 74)
- Height: 1.90 m (6 ft 3 in)
- Weight: 80 kg (180 lb)

Sport
- Sport: Horse riding
Medal record
Representing Ireland
World Championships
Gold medal – first place	1966 Burghley	Team eventing

Thomas "Tommy" Brennan (29 January 1940 – 20 July 2014) was an Irish equestrian who was successful both in jumping and eventing. He competed at the 1964 and 1968 Olympics in the mixed three-day event, individually and with the Irish team, with the best result of fourth place in the team competition in 1964. He was part of the Irish team that won the gold medal at the 1966 Eventing World Championship. Between 1964 and 1966 Brennan rode Kilkenny, who was later sold to James C. Wofford and won two silver Olympic medals. Brennan also worked with Ambassador, who was sold to Graziano Mancinelli and won an Olympic gold.

During his career Brennan won nine national titles and 67 international jumping competitions. In retirement he helped design cross-country eventing courses, in particularly the course at Punchestown, Ireland, which was used for the 1991 and 2003 European Championships. He also headed the Irish junior (1981–1985) and senior (2007) teams. In 1985 Brennan was awarded the FEI Gold Badge of Honour, and in 1997 inducted into the Irish Sports Council Hall of Fame

Brennan was born in Kilkenny, Ireland, and raised on the family farm in Dunnamaggin, where he trained in horse riding and animal husbandry. He then moved to Dublin to improve his riding skills and study agriculture. Brennan had a sister Kathleen O’Neill and brother Peter.
