= Karl-Heinz Fuhrmann =

German equestrian

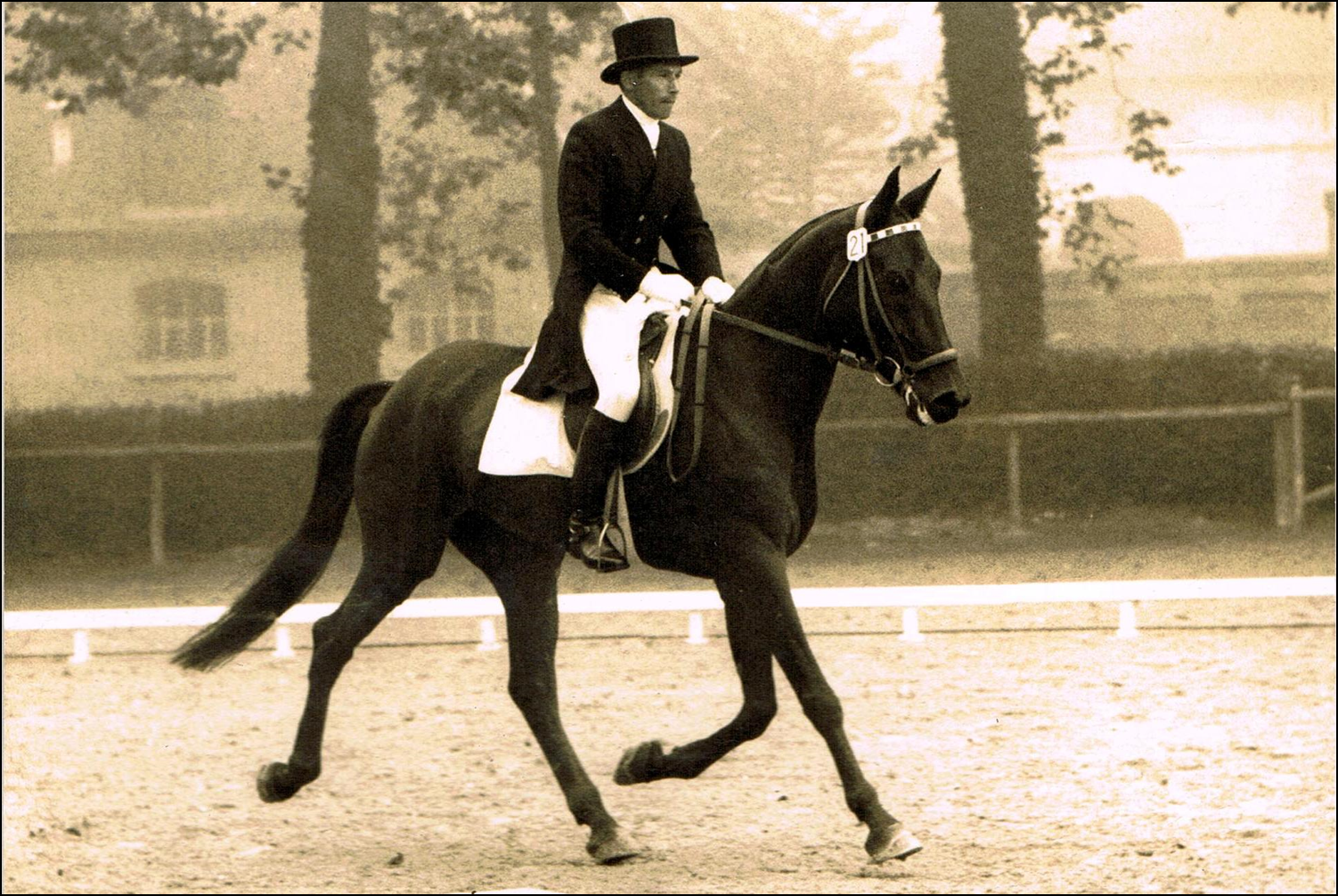

Personal information
- Nationality: German
- Born: 18 May 1937 (age 87); Recklingen, Germany

Sport
- Sport: Equestrian

Karl-Heinz Fuhrmann (born 18 May 1937) is a German equestrian. He competed at the 1964 Summer Olympics and the 1968 Summer Olympics.
