= Kevin Freeman (equestrian) =

American equestrian (1941–2023)

Personal information
- Full name: Kevin John Freeman
- Born: October 21, 1941 Portland, Oregon, U.S.
- Died: March 10, 2023 (aged 81)
Medal record
Equestrian
Representing United States
Olympic Games
Silver medal – second place	1964 Tokyo	Team eventing
Silver medal – second place	1968 Mexico City	Team eventing
Silver medal – second place	1972 Munich	Team eventing
Pan American Games
Gold medal – first place	1963 São Paulo	Team eventing
Silver medal – second place	1963 São Paulo	Individual eventing

Kevin John Freeman (October 21, 1941 – March 10, 2023) was an American equestrian who competed at three Olympic Games, winning silver medals in team eventing in 1964, 1968, and 1972.

== Early life ==
Born in Portland, Oregon, Freeman grew up on a farm in nearby Molalla. After attending Cornell University, Freeman developed his equestrian skills in California. He competed in the 1963 Pan American Games, earning a gold medal in team competition, and a silver as an individual.

== Olympics ==
In 1964, Freeman competed in eventing for the United States at the 1964 Summer Olympics in Tokyo aboard Gallopade, earning a silver medal in team competition and finishing 12th individually. Freeman competed again on the U.S. Team in the 1968 Summer Olympics in Mexico City riding Chalan. Freeman had ridden Chalan only one time before the Olympics and that was the day before the team shipped out for Mexico. In spite of a torrential rain storm on cross-country which obliterated some of the take-offs and landings, the team still won the silver medal.

== After competition ==
Freeman was inducted into the Oregon Sports Hall of Fame in 1991, and in 2009, was inducted into the United States Eventing Association Hall of Fame along with Good Mixture, his horse at the 1972 Olympics. Freeman lived in the Garden Home neighborhood of Portland. He died on March 10, 2023, at the age of 81.
