= Mikio Chiba =

Japanese equestrian

Personal information
- Nationality: Japanese
- Born: 1 May 1935 (age 89)

Sport
- Sport: Equestrian

Mikio Chiba (born 1 May 1935) is a Japanese equestrian. He competed at the 1964 Summer Olympics and the 1968 Summer Olympics.
