= Mauro Checcoli =

Italian equestrian (born 1943)

Medal record

Equestrian

Representing Italy

Olympic Games
Gold medal – first place	1964 Tokyo	Individual eventing
Gold medal – first place	1964 Tokyo	Team eventing

Mauro Checcoli (born 1 March 1943) is an Italian equestrian and Olympic champion from Bologna. He won an individual gold medal in eventing at the 1964 Summer Olympics in Tokyo. He was also a member of the Italian team that received a gold medal in team eventing at the same Olympics.
