= Giuseppe Ravano =

Italian equestrian (born 1943)

Medal record

Equestrian

Representing Italy

Olympic Games
Gold medal – first place	1964 Tokyo	Eventing, team

Giuseppe Ravano (born 5 February 1943) is an Italian equestrian and Olympic champion. He won a team gold medal in eventing at the 1964 Summer Olympics in Tokyo.
