= Juan Gesualdi =

Argentine equestrian (1929–2008)

Juan Carlos Gesualdi
Personal information
- Full name: Juan Carlos Gesualdi Bustos
- Born: 30 July 1929; Buenos Aires, Argentina
- Died: 27 October 2008 (aged 79)

Sport
- Sport: Equestrian

Juan Gesualdi (30 July 1929 – 27 October 2008) was an Argentine equestrian. He competed in two events at the 1964 Summer Olympics.
