= Pavel Deyev =

Soviet equestrian

Personal information
- Nationality: Soviet
- Born: 1 January 1942 Rostov, Russia
- Died: 2 January 2009 (aged 67)

Sport
- Sport: Equestrian
Medal record
Equestrian
Representing the Soviet Union
European Championships
Gold medal – first place	1962 Burghley	Team eventing

Pavel Deyev (1 January 1942 – 2 January 2009) was a Soviet equestrian. He competed at the 1964 Summer Olympics and the 1968 Summer Olympics.
