= German Gazyumov =

Russian equestrian

Personal information
- Nationality: Russian
- Born: 16 February 1936 (age 90) Moscow, Russia
- Died: 2007 Beltsi, Moldova

Sport
- Sport: Equestrian
Medal record
Equestrian
Representing the Soviet Union
European Championships
| Gold medal – first place | 1962 Burghley | Team eventing |
| Silver medal – second place | 1962 Burghley | Individual eventing |

German Gazyumov (born 16 February 1936) is a Russian equestrian. He competed at the 1964 Summer Olympics and the 1968 Summer Olympics. He was married twice has three sons. His first wife and sons now living in Moscow. He has six grandchild. He died in 2007, Moldova.
