= Brien Cobcroft =

Australian equestrian (1934–2010)

Personal information
- Born: 1934
- Died: 2010 (aged 75–76)
Medal record
Equestrian
Olympic Games
Representing Australia
Bronze medal – third place	1968 Mexico City	Eventing, Team

Brien Cobcroft (1934–2010) was an Australian equestrian. He won a bronze medal in team eventing at the 1968 Summer Olympics in Mexico City.
