= Michael Page (equestrian) =

American equestrian

Personal information
- Born: September 23, 1938 (age 87) New York City, New York, U.S.
Medal record
Equestrian
Representing the United States
Olympic Games
Silver medal – second place	1964 Tokyo	Team eventing
Silver medal – second place	1968 Mexico City	Team eventing
Bronze medal – third place	1968 Mexico City	Individual eventing
Pan American Games
Gold medal – first place	1959 Chicago	Individual eventing
Gold medal – first place	1963 São Paulo	Individual eventing
Gold medal – first place	1963 São Paulo	Team eventing
Gold medal – first place	1967 Winnipeg	Team eventing
Silver medal – second place	1959 Chicago	Team eventing
Bronze medal – third place	1967 Winnipeg	Individual eventing

Michael Page (born September 23, 1938) is an American equestrian. At the 1964 Summer Olympics in Tokyo he won a silver medal in team eventing, and a bronze medal in individual eventing. He won a silver medal in team eventing at the 1968 Summer Olympics in Mexico City. Page was born in New York City, New York. Page served as head trainer of Kent School's equestrian team in Kent, Connecticut for twenty eight years, retiring in 2022. The Kent School Equestrian Center was dedicated as the Michael O. Page Equestrian Center in May 2022 in recognition of his service.
