= Eduardo Higareda =

Mexican equestrian (born 1937)

Personal information
- Born: 26 February 1937 (age 89) Mexico City, Mexico

Sport
- Sport: Equestrian
Medal record
Equestrian
Representing Mexico
Pan American Games
Silver medal – second place	1971 Cali	Team jumping

Eduardo Higareda (born 26 February 1937) is a Mexican equestrian. He competed at the 1964 Summer Olympics, the 1968 Summer Olympics and the 1972 Summer Olympics.
