= Equestrian events at the 1968 Summer Olympics =

Equestrian at the Games of the XIX Olympiad
- Venue: Campo Marte; Avándaro Golf Club; Estadio Olímpico Universitario
- Dates: 18–27 October 1968
- No. of events: 6
- Competitors: 125 from 18 nations

Equestrian competitions at the 1968 Summer Olympics in Mexico City, Mexico featured team and individual competitions in show jumping, eventing, and dressage. Mexico City proved a challenging site since it was 2,300 meters above sea level, resulting in 30% less oxygen in the air. The horses at the 1955 Pan American Games, which was also held in Mexico City, arrived a few weeks before the Games to adjust, but had difficulty in the competition. However, racehorses that competed at the same location and who were shipped in the day before, and left the day after the race, performed fine. It was discovered that although horses would adjust immediately to the high altitude during the first few days after arrival, they showed weakness and decreased performance around Day 10, which continued to Day 20. Therefore, nations were advised to ship in horses 3–4 weeks before the competition, which would allow them time to recover from the long travel, as well as adjust to the difference in altitude. Argentina, Ireland, and the USSR were the first to ship horses over, who arrived mid-September. France and Germany were the last countries to send their horses, who arrived 28 September 20 days before the competition was to start.

125 entries (including 22 women) from 18 nations competed: Bolivia, Brazil, Canada, Chile, German Democratic Republic (GDR), France, Federal Republic of Germany (FRG), Great Britain, Ireland, Italy, Japan, Mexico, Poland, Soviet Union, Switzerland, and the USA. The youngest participant was Yevgeny Kuzin from the Soviet Union at 20 years old, while the oldest rider was Lorna Johnstone from Great Britain at 66 years old.

The 1968 Games timed the equestrian events manually and electronically, but for the first time the electronic time was considered official.

== Disciplines ==
=== Show jumping ===
51 riders from 16 countries contested the team and individual competitions. The 14 obstacle course for the team competition had 17 efforts, and was measured at 631 meters in length. However, only 4 of 87 rounds were within the 96 second time, prompting some to believe that the course was incorrectly measured and was really 693 meters in length. The individual competition consisted of 3 courses. The first was a 750-meter course. Round B was similar to a puissance course, with its major obstacle being a 1.70 meters high and 2.20 meters wide oxer. Round C was a 370-meter jump off.

The Irish Team had tough luck this year, after their first rider on course, Diana Conolly-Carew, was eliminated. Due to miscommunication, the Irish chef de’équipe was told that his entire team had been eliminated. Therefore, the horse of second rider Ada Matheson was sent back to the stable, so was not ready when she was called, eliminating her from the competition. The final rider, Ned Campion, later rode, but with two of the riders eliminated the team was also eliminated.

The Canadian show jumping team won the final event of the Mexico City Olympics when it captured the Team Show jumping contest at the Estadio Olympico which guaranteed a worldwide television audience. Canada would not win their next Summer Olympics gold medal until 1984.

=== Dressage ===
8 full teams competed in the dressage event, with 3 riders to a team. Additionally there were 2 individual riders from Mexico, making a total of 26 riders from 9 nations competing. The 1968 Games Grand Prix dressage test had 33 movements and lasted 12 minutes 30 seconds. It was judged by men from Chile, France, and the Netherlands, since none of these countries had riders competing. Germany and the USSR had 2 riders each in the top 4, earning them gold and silver team medals. Josef Neckermann and his mount Mariano were in first after the Grand Prix with 948 points, well ahead of Ivan Kizimov and Ikhor (908 points) and Reiner Klimke and Dux (896 points). These three riders, along with 4 others that made it into the ride-off for individual medals, performed a shortened (6 minute, 45 second) test. However, Kizimov rode a great test for 664 points, compared to Neckermann's 598, allowing him to pull ahead for the individual gold medal.

=== Eventing ===
The eventing cross-country at the 1968 Olympic Games was notoriously difficult, and today would not be acceptable for competition. Originally Oaxtepoc was chosen as the site for the cross-country course, but between the footing (very rocky) and the climate (hot and humid), the organizers decided to move the course to the golf club of Avandaro in the Valle de Bravo. Although it was at higher altitude (1,800 meters v Oaxtepoc's 1,450 meters), it had a mild climate with a cool breeze. However, it was also known for intense rainfall from October to March, a fact that was ignored and which resulted in very serious difficulties for the competitors.

30 of the 49 riders managed to complete Mario Becerril's 35 obstacle course before a heavy rain fell. Although it lasted only 30 minutes, the penultimate obstacle, a 2 meter wide stream, became 12 meters in width and flooded the entire take off point for the horses. In addition to the trouble caused by that fence, there were two equine fatalities which occurred before the rain: the USSR's Ballerina and the Irish eventer Loughlin. When all horses had completed, Jean-Jacques Guyon, Jim Wofford and Pavel Deev were in the top three with less than a 10-point margin between them.

The show-jumping phase also took its toll, after Wofford fell off Kilkenny and dropped into 6th. Deev was in contention for individual gold, but jumped the wrong fence and was eliminated. This allowed Guyon to move up to the gold medal spot, followed by British rider Derek Allhusen on Lochinvar and American Michael Page on Foster.

== Medal summary ==
Games	Gold	Silver	Bronze
Individual dressage	Ivan Kizimov on Ikhor (URS)	Josef Neckermann on Mariano (FRG)	Reiner Klimke on Dux (FRG)
Team dressage	West Germany; Josef Neckermann and Mariano; Reiner Klimke and Dux; Liselott Linsenhoff and Piaff	Soviet Union; Yelena Petushkova and Pepel; Ivan Kizimov and Ikhor; Ivan Kalita and Absent	Switzerland; Henri Chammartin and Wolfdietrich; Marianne Gossweiler and Stephan; Gustav Fischer and Wald
Individual eventing	Jean-Jacques Guyon and Pitou (FRA)	Derek Allhusen and Lochinvar (GBR)	Michael Page and Foster (USA)
Team eventing	Great Britain; Derek Allhusen and Lochinvar; Richard Meade and Cornishman V Reuben Jones and The Poacher	United States; Michael Page and Foster; James C. Wofford and Kilkenny; Michael Plumb and Plain Sailing	Australia; Wayne Roycroft and Zhivago; Brien Cobcroft and Depeche; Bill Roycroft and Warrathoola
Individual jumping	William Steinkraus and Snowbound (USA)	Marion Coakes and Stroller (GBR)	David Broome and Mr. Softee (GBR)
Team jumping	Canada; James Day and Canadian Club; Thomas Gayford and Big Dee; Jim Elder and The Immigrant	France; Jean Rozier and Quo Vadis; Janou Lefèbvre and Rocket; Pierre Jonquères d'Oriola and Nagir	West Germany; Hermann Schridde and Dozent II; Alwin Schockemöhle and Donald Rex; Hans Günter Winkler and Enigk

== Medal table ==
Rank	Nation	Gold	Silver	Bronze	Total
1	Great Britain	1	2	1	4
2	West Germany	1	1	2	4
3	United States	1	1	1	3
4	France	1	1	0	2
4	Soviet Union	1	1	0	2
6	Canada	1	0	0	1
7	Australia	0	0	1	1
7	Switzerland	0	0	1	1
Totals (8 entries)		6	6	6	18

== Officials ==
Appointment of officials was as follows:

Dressage

- (France) Georges Margot (Ground Jury President)
- (Netherlands) Jaap Pot (Ground Jury Member)
- (Chile) Hernan Vigil Simpson (Ground Jury Member)

Jumping

- (Italy) Bruno Bruni (Ground Jury President)
- (Mexico) Eduardo Baz (Ground Jury Member)
- (France) Pierre Clavé (Ground Jury Member)
- (Mexico) Ruben Uriza (Course Designer)
- (Republic of Ireland) John E. Wylie (Technical Delegate)

Eventing

- (West Germany) Edwin Rothkirch (Ground Jury President)
- (France) Bernard Chevallier (Ground Jury Member)
- (Sweden) Gustaf Nyblæus (Ground Jury Member)
- (Mexico) Mario Becerril (Course Designer)
- (United Kingdom) Laurence Rook (Technical Delegate)
