= Equestrian at the 1976 Summer Olympics – Individual eventing =

Equestrian at the Olympics

Individual eventing at the Games of the XXI Olympiad
- Venue: Olympic Equestrian Centre
- Date: 23–25 July
- Competitors: 49 from 13 nations

Medalists
1st place, gold medalist(s)		Edmund Coffin	United States
2nd place, silver medalist(s)		Michael Plumb	United States
3rd place, bronze medalist(s)		Karl Schultz	West Germany

The individual eventing at the 1976 Summer Olympics took place on 23 and 25 July. The event was open to men and women. The competition included three segments: dressage, cross-country, and show-jumping. Penalties from each were summed to give a total score.

The competition was split into three phases:

1. Dressage (23 July)
  Riders performed the dressage test.
2. Endurance (24 July)
  Riders tackled roads and tracks, steeplechase and cross-country portions.
3. Jumping (25 July)
  Riders jumped at the show jumping course.

== Results ==
Rank	Rider	Horse	Nationality	Dressage	Rank	Endurance	Rank	After Endurance	Rank	Jumping	Rank	Total
1st place, gold medalist(s)	Edmund Coffin	Bally-Cor	United States	64.59	6	50.40	2	114.99	2	0.00	1	114.99
2nd place, silver medalist(s)	Michael Plumb	Better & Better	United States	66.25	7	49.60	1	115.85	3	10.00	14	125.85
3rd place, bronze medalist(s)	Karl Schultz	Madrigal	West Germany	46.25	1	63.20	5	109.45	1	20.00	25	129.45
4	Richard Meade	Finvarra	Great Britain	73.75	12	57.60	3	131.35	5	10.00	14	141.35
5	Wayne Roycroft	Laurenson	Australia	80.84	13	97.20	12	178.04	7	0.00	1	178.04
6	Gerry Sinnott	Croghan	Ireland	101.25	37	77.60	7	178.85	8	0.00	1	178.85
7	Jean Valat	Vampire	France	92.50	27	95.20	11	187.70	9	0.00	1	187.70
8	Yuri Salnikov	Rumpel	Soviet Union	86.66	19	102.80	14	189.46	10	0.00	1	189.46
9	Federico Roman	Shamrock	Italy	73.34	10	120.80	16	194.14	14	0.00	1	194.14
10	Bruce Davidson	Irish-Cap	United States	54.16	2	136.00	20	190.16	11	10.00	14	200.16
11	Juliet Graham	Sumatra	Canada	110.84	46	81.60	8	192.44	12	10.25	24	202.69
12	Mervyn Bennett	Regal Reign	Australia	120.84	49	85.20	9	206.04	16	0.00	1	206.04
13	Herbert Blöcker	Albrant	West Germany	108.75	44	94.40	10	203.15	15	10.00	14	213.15
14	Mario Turner	Tempest Blisland	Italy	99.59	36	113.60	15	213.19	18	0.00	1	213.19
15	Eric Horgan	Pontoon	Ireland	72.50	9	120.80	16	193.30	13	20.00	25	213.30
16	Bill Roycroft	Version	Australia	86.66	19	128.80	19	215.46	20	0.00	1	215.46
17	Valery Dvoryaninov	Zeila	Soviet Union	86.25	18	122.00	18	208.25	17	10.00	14	218.25
18	Jean-Yves Touzaint	Aladin	France	112.91	47	101.20	13	214.11	19	10.00	14	224.11
19	Helmut Rethemeier	Pauline	West Germany	70.00	8	152.00	21	222.00	21	20.00	25	242.00
20	Denis Pigott	Hillstead	Australia	92.91	28	153.60	22	246.51	23	0.00	1	246.51
21	Mary Anne Tauskey	Marcus Aurelius	United States	97.06	34	162.40	24	259.46	24	10.00	14	269.46
22	Alessandro Argenton	Woodland	Italy	102.91	39	172.00	25	274.91	25	0.00	1	274.91
23	Cathy Wedge	City Fella	Canada	99.16	35	187.60	26	286.76	27	0.00	1	286.76
24	Princess Anne	Goodwill	Great Britain	91.25	26	204.80	27	296.05	28	3.25	13	299.30
25	Viktor Kalinin	Araks	Soviet Union	85.84	17	218.00	29	303.84	29	10.00	14	313.84
26	Robin Hahn	L'Esprit	Canada	94.16	31	215.20	28	309.36	30	10.00	14	319.36
27	Carlos Alfonso	Ucase	Argentina	117.91	48	321.20	32	439.11	33	10.00	14	449.11
28	Rodolfo Grazzini	Veracruz	Argentina	88.34	23	420.80	34	509.14	34	20.75	29	529.89
29	Juan Roberto Redon	Arrupe	Mexico	105.41	42	574.00	35	679.41	35	20.00	25	699.41
DNF	Ronnie McMahon	San Carlos	Ireland	107.50	43	322.40	33	429.90	32	Disqualified		
DNF	Lucinda Prior-Palmer	Be Fair	Great Britain	62.91	5	59.60	4	122.51	4	did not finish		
DNF	Giovanni Bossi	Boston	Italy	92.91	28	68.80	6	161.71	6	did not finish		
DNF	Hugh Thomas	Playamar	Great Britain	85.00	16	156.00	23	241.00	22	did not finish		
DNF	Jim Day	Viceroy	Canada	60.00	4	220.40	30	280.40	26	did not finish		
DNF	Norman van de Vater	Blue Tom Tit	Ireland	94.16	31	279.20	31	373.36	31	did not finish		
DNF	Otto Ammermann	Volturno	West Germany	58.75	3	Disqualified		did not advance				
DNF	Thierry Touzaint	Ut Majeur	France	73.34	10	did not finish		did not advance				
DNF	Dominique Bentejac	Djerk	France	82.09	14	Disqualified		did not advance				
DNF	Gen Ueda	Pontiff	Japan	82.91	15	did not finish		did not advance				
DNF	David Bárcena	Cachibache	Mexico	87.09	21	did not finish		did not advance				
DNF	Carlos Rawson	Dos de Oro	Argentina	87.50	22	did not finish		did not advance				
DNF	Pyotr Gornushko	Gusar	Soviet Union	88.75	24	did not finish		did not advance				
DNF	Kenkichi Ishiguro	Asodeska	Japan	90.84	25	Disqualified		did not advance				
DNF	Silvia de Luna	Tahuoca	Guatemala	93.34	30	Disqualified		did not advance				
DNF	Ángel Boyenechea	Rasputin	Argentina	94.16	31	Disqualified		did not advance				
DNF	Rita de Luna	Pampa	Guatemala	101.66	38	Disqualified		did not advance				
DNF	José Luis Pérez Soto	Fasinante	Mexico	104.59	40	Disqualified		did not advance				
DNF	Kenji Eto	Inter-Nihon	Japan	105.00	41	Disqualified		did not advance				
DNF	Maríano Bucio	Cocaleco	Mexico	108.75	44	Disqualified		did not advance				
