= Equestrian at the 1976 Summer Olympics – Team eventing =

Team eventing at the Games of the XXI Olympiad
- Venue: Olympic Equestrian Centre
- Date: 23–25 July
- Competitors: 47 from 12 nations

Medalists
1st place, gold medalist(s)		Edmund Coffin; Bruce Davidson; Michael Plumb; Mary Anne Tauskey	United States
2nd place, silver medalist(s)		Otto Ammermann; Herbert Blöcker; Helmut Rethemeier; Karl Schultz	West Germany
3rd place, bronze medalist(s)		Mervyn Bennet; Denis Pigott; Bill Roycroft; Wayne Roycroft	Australia

The team eventing at the 1976 Summer Olympics took place between 23 and 25 July. The event was open to men and women. The competition included three segments: dressage, cross-country and show-jumping. Penalties from each were summed to give a total score. Scores from the top 3 horse and rider pairs for each nation were summed to give a team score; the lowest pair's score was dropped. Teams without at least 3 finishing pairs were not given a final score.

The competition was split into three phases:

1. Dressage (23 July)
  Riders performed the dressage test.
2. Endurance (24 July)
  Riders tackled roads and tracks, steeplechase and cross-country portions.
3. Jumping (25 July)
  Riders jumped at the show jumping course.

== Results ==
Rank	Nation	Individual results						Team score
Rank	Nation	Rider	Horse	Dressage	Endurance	Jumping	Total	Team score
1st place, gold medalist(s)	United States	Edmund Coffin	Bally-Cor	64.59	50.40	0.00	114.99	441.00
1st place, gold medalist(s)	United States	Michael Plumb	Better & Better	66.25	49.60	10.00	125.85	441.00
1st place, gold medalist(s)	United States	Bruce Davidson	Irish-Cap	54.16	136.00	10.00	200.16	441.00
1st place, gold medalist(s)	United States	Mary Anne Tauskey	Marcus Aurelius	97.06	162.40	10.00	~~269.46~~	441.00
2nd place, silver medalist(s)	West Germany	Karl Schultz	Madrigal	46.25	63.20	20.00	129.45	584.60
2nd place, silver medalist(s)	West Germany	Herbert Blöcker	Albrant	108.75	94.40	10.00	213.15	584.60
2nd place, silver medalist(s)	West Germany	Helmut Rethemeier	Pauline	70.00	152.00	20.00	242.00	584.60
2nd place, silver medalist(s)	West Germany	Otto Ammermann	Volturno	58.75	DSQ	EL	EL	584.60
3rd place, bronze medalist(s)	Australia	Wayne Roycroft	Laurenson	80.84	97.20	0.00	178.04	599.54
3rd place, bronze medalist(s)	Australia	Mervyn Bennett	Regal Reign	120.84	85.20	0.00	206.04	599.54
3rd place, bronze medalist(s)	Australia	Bill Roycroft	Version	86.66	128.80	0.00	215.46	599.54
3rd place, bronze medalist(s)	Australia	Denis Pigott	Hillstead	92.91	153.60	0.00	~~246.51~~	599.54
4	Italy	Federico Roman	Shamrock	73.34	120.80	0.00	194.14	682.24
4	Italy	Mario Turner	Tempest Blisland	99.59	113.60	0.00	213.19	682.24
4	Italy	Alessandro Argenton	Woodland	102.91	172.00	0.00	274.91	682.24
4	Italy	Giovanni Bossi	Boston	92.91	68.80	DNF	EL	682.24
5	Soviet Union	Yuri Salnikov	Rumpel	86.66	102.80	0.00	189.46	721.55
5	Soviet Union	Valery Dvoryaninov	Zeila	86.25	122.00	10.00	218.25	721.55
5	Soviet Union	Viktor Kalinin	Araks	85.84	218.00	10.00	313.84	721.55
5	Soviet Union	Pyotr Gornushko	Gusar	88.75	DNF	EL	EL	721.55
6	Canada	Juliet Graham	Sumatra	110.84	81.60	10.25	202.69	808.81
6	Canada	Cathy Wedge	City Fella	99.16	187.60	0.00	286.76	808.81
6	Canada	Robin Hahn	L'Esprit	94.16	215.20	10.00	319.36	808.81
6	Canada	Jim Day	Viceroy	60.00	220.40	DNF	EL	808.81
–	Ireland	Gerry Sinnott	Croghan	101.25	77.60	0.00	178.85	EL
–	Ireland	Eric Horgan	Pontoon	72.50	120.80	20.00	213.30	EL
–	Ireland	Ronnie McMahon	San Carlos	107.50	322.40	DSQ	EL	EL
–	Ireland	Norman van de Vater	Blue Tom Tit	94.16	279.20	DNF	EL	EL
–	France	Jean Valat	Vampire	92.50	95.20	0.00	187.70	EL
–	France	Jean-Yves Touzaint	Aladin	112.91	101.20	10.00	224.11	EL
–	France	Thierry Touzaint	Ut Majeur	73.34	DNF	EL	EL	EL
–	France	Dominique Bentejac	Djerk	82.09	DSQ	EL	EL	EL
–	Great Britain	Richard Meade	Finvarra	73.75	57.60	10.00	141.35	EL
–	Great Britain	Princess Anne	Goodwill	91.25	204.80	3.25	299.30	EL
–	Great Britain	Lucinda Prior-Palmer	Be Fair	62.91	59.60	DNF	EL	EL
–	Great Britain	Hugh Thomas	Playamar	85.00	156.00	DNF	EL	EL
–	Argentina	Carlos Alfonso	Ucase	117.91	321.20	10.00	449.11	EL
–	Argentina	Rodolfo Grazzini	Veracruz	88.34	420.80	20.75	529.89	EL
–	Argentina	Carlos Rawson	Dos de Oro	87.50	DNF	EL	EL	EL
–	Argentina	Ángel Boyenechea	Rasputin	94.16	DSQ	EL	EL	EL
–	Mexico	Juan Roberto Redon	Arrupe	105.41	574.00	20.00	699.41	EL
–	Mexico	David Bárcena	Cachibache	87.09	DNF	EL	EL	EL
–	Mexico	José Luis Pérez Soto	Fasinante	104.59	DSQ	EL	EL	EL
–	Mexico	Maríano Bucio	Cocaleco	108.75	DSQ	EL	EL	EL
–	Japan	Gen Ueda	Pontiff	82.91	DNF	EL	EL	EL
–	Japan	Kenkichi Ishiguro	Asodeska	90.84	DSQ	EL	EL	EL
–	Japan	Kenji Eto	Inter-Nihon	105.00	DSQ	EL	EL	EL
