= Argentina at the 1976 Summer Olympics =

- IOC code: ARG
- NOC: Argentine Olympic Committee

in Montreal Canada
- Competitors: 69 (65 men and 4 women) in 12 sports
- Flag bearer: Hugo Aberastegui
- Medals: Gold 0 Silver 0 Bronze 0 Total 0

Summer Olympics appearances (overview)
- 1900; 1904; 1908; 1912; 1920; 1924; 1928; 1932; 1936; 1948; 1952; 1956; 1960; 1964; 1968; 1972; 1976; 1980; 1984; 1988; 1992; 1996; 2000; 2004; 2008; 2012; 2016; 2020; 2024

Argentina competed at the 1976 Summer Olympics in Montreal, Quebec, Canada. A total of 69 competitors, 65 men and 4 women, took part in 50 events in 12 sports. No medals were won by Argentine athletes for the first time since 1920.

== Athletics ==
Men

Athlete	Events	Heat		Quarterfinal		Semifinal		Final	
Athlete	Events	Result	Rank	Result	Rank	Result	Rank	Result	Rank
Juan Adolfo Turri	Men's shot put	17.76	21	N/A				did not advance	
Tito Steiner	Men's decathlon	N/A						7052	22

Decathlon

Event	Tito Steiner	
Event	Result	Points
100 m hurdles (s)	11.37	717
Long jump (m)	6.73	763
Shot put (m)	13.85	719
High jump (m)	1.84	716
400 m (s)	50.30	792
110 m hurdles (s)	15.82	766
Discus throw (m)	40.26	691
Pole vault (m)	3.80	754
Javelin throw (m)	49.74	629
1500 m (s)	4:43.16	505
Total		7052

== Boxing ==
Athlete	Event	Round of 32	Round of 16	Quarterfinals	Semifinals	Final	
Athlete	Event	Opposition Result	Opposition Result	Opposition Result	Opposition Result	Opposition Result	Rank
Héctor Patri	Light flyweight	Edoh (TOG); W W/O	Abdelwahab (EGY); W W/O	Maldonado (PUR); L 0 – 5	did not advance		
Luis Portillo	Light welterweight	Chanchoun (IRQ); W W/O	Sittler (AUT); W 2 – 0 (KO)	Szczerba (POL); L 0 – 5	did not advance		
Juan Domingo Suárez	Light heavyweight	Tafer (FRA); W 1 – 0 (KO)	Jakab (HUN); W 1 – 0 (KO)	Gortat (POL); L 1 – 4	did not advance		

== Cycling ==
Athlete	Event	Time	Rank
Osvaldo Benvenuti	Men's individual road race	did not finish	
Oswaldo Frossasco	Men's individual road race	did not finish	
Juan Carlos Haedo	Men's individual road race	did not finish	
Raúl Labbate	Men's individual road race	did not finish	
Osvaldo Benvenuti	Men's 1000m time trial	2:24:48	22
Oswaldo Frossasco	Men's 1000m time trial	2:24:48	22
Juan Carlos Haedo	Men's 1000m time trial	2:24:48	22
Raúl Labbate	Men's 1000m time trial	2:24:48	22

== Equestrian ==
=== Dressage ===
Athlete	Horse	Event	Qualifying round		Final		Total	
Athlete	Horse	Event	Score	Rank	Score	Rank	Score	Rank
Guillermo Pellegrini	Rosicler	Individual	1294	26	did not advance			

=== Eventing ===
Athlete	Horse	Event	Dressage		Cross-country		Show jumping		Total	
Athlete	Horse	Event	Penalties	Rank	Penalties	Rank	Penalties	Rank	Penalties	Rank
Carlos Alfonso	Ucase	Individual	117.91	48	321.20	32	10.00	=14	449.11	27
Angel Boyenechea	Rasputin	Individual	94.16	=31	Disqualified					
Rodolfo Grazzini	Veracruz	Individual	88.34	23	420.80	34	20.75	29	529.89	28
Carlos Rawson	Dos de Oro	Individual	87.50	22	did not finish					
Carlos Alfonso, Angel Boyenechea, Rodolfo Grazzini, Carlos Rawson	Ucase, Rasputin, Veracruz, Dos de Oro	Team	270.00	10	did not finish					

=== Show jumping ===
Athlete	Horse	Event	Qualifying round		Total	
Athlete	Horse	Event	Penalties	Rank	Penalties	Rank
Argentino Molinuevo, Jr.	Marsupial	Individual	8.00	=10 Q	27.50	18
Roberto Tagle	Simple	Individual	12.00	=22	did not advance	
Roberto Tagle	Simple	Team	did not finish			

== Fencing ==
Athlete	Event	First round		Second round		Quarterfinal		Semifinal		Final	
Athlete	Event	Opposition Score	Rank	Opposition Score	Rank	Opposition Score	Rank	Opposition Score	Rank	Opposition Score	Rank
Daniel Feraud	Men's épée	Pool 2 Jacobson (SWE); L 1 – 5 Hehn (FRG); L 1 – 5 Lukomsky (URS); W 5 – 4 Varaljay (CAN); W 5 – 5	4	did not advance		—N/a		did not advance			
Juan Daniel Pirán	Men's épée	Pool 1 Johnson (GBR); L 0 – 5 Pusch (FRG); L 1 – 5 Pezza (ITA); L 2 – 5 Tatrallyay (CAN); L 1 – 5	4	did not advance		—N/a		did not advance			
Omar Vergara	Men's épée	Pool 7 Suchanecki (SUI); W 5 – 1 Wiech (POL); W 5 – 4 Zarnegar (IRI); W 5 – 4 Edling (SWE); L 1 – 5	2 Q	Pool 6 Hehn (FRG); L 2 – 5 Boisse (FRA); L 2 – 5 Janikowski (POL); L 3 – 5 Ralph Johnson (GBR); L 1 – 5 Abushakhmetov (URS); L 3 – 5	6	—N/a		did not advance			
Daniel Feraud	Men's foil	Pool 9 Reichert (FRG); L 0 – 5 Kuki (ROU); L 2 – 5 Koziejowski (POL); L 1 – 5 Jhons (CUB); L 1 – 5 Pashapour-Alamdari (IRI); L 2 – 5	6	did not advance		—N/a		did not advance			
Fernando Lupiz	Men's foil	Pool 4 Stankovych (URS); L 2 – 5 Hein (FRG); L 1 – 5 Donofrio (USA); L 4 – 5 Dal Zotto (ITA); L 4 – 5 Chan (HKG); W 5 – 4	5	did not advance		—N/a		did not advance			
Omar Vergara	Men's foil	Pool 8 Behr (FRG); L 1 – 5 Ballinger (USA); L 3 – 5 Akbari (IRI); L 4 – 5 Kawatsu (JPN); L 4 – 5 Jurka (TCH); L 0 – 5	6	did not advance		—N/a		did not advance			
Daniel Feraud, Fernando Lupiz, Juan Daniel Pirán, Omar Vergara	Men's team épée	Pool 4 Switzerland; L 3 – 13; Norway; L 2 – 14; Canada; L 8 (66) – 8 (68)	6	did not advance							
José María Casanovas	Men's sabre	Pool 5 Krovopuskov (URS); L 0 – 5 Kovács (HUN); L 2 – 5 Salazar (CUB); L 1 – 5 Sukunda (CAN); L 4 – 5	5	did not advance		—N/a		did not advance			
Juan Gavajda	Men's sabre	Pool 5 Pop (ROU); L 0 – 5 Westbrook (USA); L 2 – 5 Marót (HUN); L 2 – 5 Mather (GBR); L 2 – 5	5	did not advance		—N/a		did not advance			
José María Casanovas, Juan Gavajda, Fernando Lupiz, Marcelo Méndez	Men's team épée	Pool 4 Hungary; L 2 – 14; Poland; L 6 – 10; Iran; L 4 – 9	3	—N/a		did not advance					

== Field hockey ==
Head Coach: Mario Ranalli

1. Julio César Cufre (GK)
2. Jorge Sabbione
3. Jorge Disera
4. Osvaldo Zanni
5. Jorge Ivorra
6. Luis Antonio Costa
7. Marcelo Garraffo
8. Flavio de Giacomi
9. Fernando Calp
10. Alberto Sabbione
11. Daniel Portugués
12. Alfredo Quaquarini
13. Gustavo Paolucci
14. César Raguso

Group play

	Team	Pts	P	W	D	L	GF	GA
1	Netherlands	10	5	5	0	0	11	3
2	Australia	6	5	3	0	2	14	6
3	India	6	5	3	0	2	12	9
4	Malaysia	4	5	2	0	3	3	7
5	Canada	2	5	1	0	4	4	11
6	Argentina	2	5	1	0	4	4	12

Qualified for semifinals

July 18, 1976

India	4 – 0	Argentina

July 20, 1976

Argentina	1 – 3	Canada

July 21, 1976

Malaysia	2 – 0	Argentina

July 23, 1976

Netherlands	1 – 0	Argentina

July 24, 1976

Australia	2 – 3	Argentina

== Judo ==
Athlete	Event	Round of 64	Round of 32	Round of 16	Quarterfinals	Semifinals	Repechage	Bronze medal	Final	
Athlete	Event	Opposition Result	Opposition Result	Opposition Result	Opposition Result	Opposition Result	Opposition Result	Opposition Result	Opposition Result	Rank
Oscar Strático	Men's -70 kg	—N/a	Mackay (ECU); W	Gamba (ITA); L	did not advance					
Jorge Portelli	Men's -93 kg	Bye	Tsendaivsh (MGL); W	Starbrook (GBR); L	did not advance					
Jorge Portelli	Men's open category	—N/a	Jaime Felipa (AHO); W	Ibañez (CUB); W	Wallas (AUT); W	Remfry (GBR); L	Bye	Cho (KOR); L	did not advance	

== Rowing ==
Athlete	Event	Heats		Repechage		Semifinals		Final	
Athlete	Event	Time	Rank	Time	Rank	Time	Rank	Time	Rank
Ricardo Ibarra	Men's single sculls	7:17.41	1 Q	BYE		6:57.41	1 FA	8:03.05	6
Carlos Denari; Marcelo Gismondi; Jorge Molina; Juan Tuma	Men's coxless four	6:49.33	5	6:30.56	6	did not advance			
Hugo Aberastegui; Hugo Constantini; Ignacio Ruiz; Raúl Tettamanti; Jorge Segurado	Men's coxed four	7:04.38	5	6:26.89	4	did not advance			

== Sailing ==
Open

Athlete	Event	Race														Final rank	
Athlete	Event	1		2		3		4		5		6		7		Final rank	
Athlete	Event	Score	Rank	Score	Rank	Score	Rank	Score	Rank	Score	Rank	Score	Rank	Score	Rank	Score	Rank
Juan C. Firpo	Finn	~~29.0~~	~~23~~	24.0	18	20.0	14	17.0	11	25.0	19	29.0	23	29.0	23	144.0	23
Pedro Ferrero; Jorge Rão; Andrés Robinson	Soling	~~28.0~~	~~22~~	28.0	22	24.0	18	20.0	14	21.0	15	20.0	14	25.0	19	138.0	20

== Shooting ==
Athlete	Event	Round 1	Round 2	Round 3	Round 4	Round 5	Round 6	Total	Rank
Osvaldo Scandola	25 m rapid-fire pistol	294	291	—N/a				585	=27
Oscar Yuston	25 m rapid-fire pistol	283	282	—N/a				565	40
Juan Casey	50 m free pistol	83	90	89	89	86	78	515	=43
Jorge di Giandoménico	50 m rifle 3 positions	271	279	274	282	—N/a		1,106	=51
Ricardo Rusticucci	50 m rifle prone	96	97	97	98	99	96	583	=57
Firmo Roberti	Skeet	—N/a						193	=11

== Swimming ==
Men

Athlete	Event	Heat		Semifinal		Final	
Athlete	Event	Time	Rank	Time	Rank	Time	Rank
Conrado Porta	100 m backstroke	1:01.13	31	did not advance			
Conrado Porta	200 m backstroke	2:09.75	18	—N/a		did not advance	

Women

Athlete	Event	Heat		Semifinal		Final	
Athlete	Event	Time	Rank	Time	Rank	Time	Rank
Claudia Bellotto	100 m backstroke	1:10.27	28	did not advance			
Claudia Bellotto	200 m backstroke	2:32.60	28	—N/a		did not advance	
Susana Coppo	100 m freestyle	1:02.46	40	did not advance			
Susana Coppo	200 m freestyle	2:19.26	37	—N/a		did not advance	
Susana Coppo	400 m freestyle	4:57.41	28	—N/a		did not advance	
Rossana Juncos	100 m freestyle	1:01.89	42	did not advance			
Rossana Juncos	100 m breaststroke	1:21.53	35	did not advance			
Rossana Juncos	100 m butterfly	1:06.76	33	did not advance			
Rossana Juncos	200 m butterfly	2:28.81	30	did not advance			
Patricia Spohn	200 m breaststroke	2:59.51	38	—N/a		did not advance	
Claudia Bellotto, Susana Coppo, Rosanna Juncos, Patricia Spohn	4 × 100 m freestyle relay	4:14.57	12	—N/a		did not advance	
Claudia Bellotto, Susana Coppo, Rosanna Juncos, Patricia Spohn	4 × 100 m medley relay	4:41.82	16	—N/a		did not advance	

== Wrestling ==
Men's freestyle

Athlete	Event	Round 1	Round 2	Round 3	Round 4	Round 5	Round 6	Final	
Athlete	Event	Opposition Result	Opposition Result	Opposition Result	Opposition Result	Opposition Result	Opposition Result	Opposition Result	Rank
Sergio Fiszman	–68 kg	Gilligan (GBR); L (TF)	Mané (SEN); W (TF)	Navaei (IRI); L (TF)	did not advance				
Daniel Verník	–100 kg	N'Diaye (SEN); W (TF)	Yarygin (URS); L (TF)	Drozda (TCH); L (TF)	did not advance				
Carlos Braconi	+100 kg	Isogai (JPN); L (TF)	Sakho (SEN); L (TF)	did not advance					

Men's Greco-Roman

Athlete	Event	Round 1	Round 2	Round 3	Round 4	Round 5	Round 6	Final	
Athlete	Event	Opposition Result	Opposition Result	Opposition Result	Opposition Result	Opposition Result	Opposition Result	Opposition Result	Rank
Sergio Fiszman	–68 kg	Toma (HUN); L (TF)	Nedev (BUL); L (TF)	did not advance					
Daniel Verník	–100 kg	Bye	Skrzydlewski (POL); L (TF)	Schäfer (FRG); L (TF)	Did not advance	—N/a		did not advance	
Carlos Braconi	+100 kg	Gundersen (NOR); L (DQ)	Kolchynskiy (URS); L (TF)	did not advance		—N/a		did not advance	

Key

- DQ – Won/lost by passivity.
- TF – Won/lost by fall.
