= United States at the 1976 Summer Olympics =

- Flag of the United States
- IOC code: USA
- NOC: United States Olympic Committee

in Montreal
- Competitors: 396 (278 men and 118 women) in 19 sports
- Flag bearer: Gary Hall, Sr.
- Medals Ranked 3rd: Gold 34 Silver 35 Bronze 25 Total 94

Summer Olympics appearances (overview)
- 1896; 1900; 1904; 1908; 1912; 1920; 1924; 1928; 1932; 1936; 1948; 1952; 1956; 1960; 1964; 1968; 1972; 1976; 1980; 1984; 1988; 1992; 1996; 2000; 2004; 2008; 2012; 2016; 2020; 2024; 2028

Other related appearances
- 1906 Intercalated Games

The United States competed at the 1976 Summer Olympics in Montreal, Quebec, Canada. 396 competitors, 278 men and 118 women, took part in 189 events in 19 sports.

== Medalists ==
The United States finished third in the final medal rankings, with 34 gold and 94 total medals.

The following U.S. competitors won medals at the games. In the discipline sections below, the medalists' names are bolded.

Medal	Name	Sport	Event	Date
Gold	Mike Bruner	Swimming	Men's 200 meter butterfly	July 18
Gold	Bruce Furniss	Swimming	Men's 200 meter freestyle	July 19
Gold	John Naber	Swimming	Men's 100 meter backstroke	July 19
Gold	Jennifer Chandler	Diving	Women's 3 meter springboard	July 20
Gold	Donald Haldeman	Shooting	Trap	July 20
Gold	Brian Goodell	Swimming	Men's 1500 meter freestyle	July 20
Gold	John Hencken	Swimming	Men's 100 meter breaststroke	July 20
Gold	Lanny Bassham	Shooting	50 meter rifle three positions	July 21
Gold	Matt Vogel	Swimming	Men's 100 meter butterfly	July 21
Gold	Mike Bruner; Bruce Furniss; Jim Montgomery; John Naber; Doug Northway^{[a]} Tim Shaw^{[a]}	Swimming	Men's 4 × 200 meter freestyle relay	July 21
Gold	Phil Boggs	Diving	Men's 3 meter springboard	July 22
Gold	Brian Goodell	Swimming	Men's 400 meter freestyle	July 22
Gold	Jack Babashoff^{[a]} Joe Bottom^{[a]} John Hencken; Jim Montgomery; John Naber; Peter Rocca^{[a]} Matt Vogel; Chris Woo^{[a]}	Swimming	Men's 4 × 100 meter medley relay	July 22
Gold	John Naber	Swimming	Men's 200 meter backstroke	July 24
Gold	Edwin Moses	Athletics	Men's 400 meter hurdles	July 25
Gold	Mac Wilkins	Athletics	Men's discus throw	July 25
Gold	Edmund Coffin	Equestrian	Individual eventing	July 25
Gold	Edmund Coffin; Bruce Davidson; Michael Plumb; Mary Tauskey	Equestrian	Team eventing	July 25
Gold	Jim Montgomery	Swimming	Men's 100 meter freestyle	July 25
Gold	Rod Strachan	Swimming	Men's 400 meter individual medley	July 25
Gold	Shirley Babashoff; Wendy Boglioli; Kim Peyton; Jill Sterkel	Swimming	Women's 4 × 100 meter freestyle relay	July 25
Gold	United States men's national basketball team: Tate Armstrong; Quinn Buckner; Kenny Carr; Adrian Dantley; Walter Davis; Phil Ford; Ernie Grunfeld; Phil Hubbard; Mitchell Kupchak; Thomas LaGarde; Scott May; Steve Sheppard	Basketball	Men's tournament	July 27
Gold	Arnie Robinson	Athletics	Men's long jump	July 29
Gold	Darrell Pace	Archery	Men's individual	July 30
Gold	Luann Ryon	Archery	Women's individual	July 30
Gold	Bruce Jenner	Athletics	Men's decathlon	July 30
Gold	Harvey Glance; Millard Hampton; Lam Jones; Steve Riddick	Athletics	Men's 4 × 100 meter relay	July 31
Gold	Benny Brown; Herman Frazier; Fred Newhouse; Maxie Parks	Athletics	Men's 4 × 400 meter relay	July 31
Gold	Leo Randolph	Boxing	Flyweight	July 31
Gold	Howard Davis	Boxing	Lightweight	July 31
Gold	Ray Leonard	Boxing	Light welterweight	July 31
Gold	Michael Spinks	Boxing	Middleweight	July 31
Gold	Leon Spinks	Boxing	Light heavyweight	July 31
Gold	John Peterson	Wrestling	Freestyle 82 kilograms	July 31
Silver	Steve Gregg	Swimming	Men's 200 meter butterfly	July 18
Silver	Shirley Babashoff; Wendy Boglioli^{[a]} Lelei Fonoimoana^{[a]} Linda Jezek; Lauri Siering; Camille Wright	Swimming	Women's 4 × 100 meter medley relay	July 18
Silver	Peter Rocca	Swimming	Men's 100 meter backstroke	July 19
Silver	Bobby Hackett	Swimming	Men's 1500 meter freestyle	July 20
Silver	Shirley Babashoff	Swimming	Women's 400 meter freestyle	July 20
Silver	Margaret Murdock	Shooting	50 meter rifle three positions	July 21
Silver	Joe Bottom	Swimming	Men's 100 meter butterfly	July 21
Silver	Tim Shaw	Swimming	Men's 400 meter freestyle	July 22
Silver	Shirley Babashoff	Swimming	Women's 200 meter freestyle	July 22
Silver	Kathy McMillan	Athletics	Women's long jump	July 23
Silver	Joan Lind	Rowing	Women's single sculls	July 24
Silver	Peter Rocca	Swimming	Men's 200 meter backstroke	July 24
Silver	John Hencken	Swimming	Men's 200 meter breaststroke	July 24
Silver	Shirley Babashoff	Swimming	Women's 800 meter freestyle	July 24
Silver	Michael Shine	Athletics	Men's 400 meter hurdles	July 25
Silver	Michael Plumb	Equestrian	Individual eventing	July 25
Silver	Calvin Coffey; Mike Staines	Rowing	Men's coxless pair	July 25
Silver	Jack Babashoff	Swimming	Men's 100 meter freestyle	July 25
Silver	John Naber	Swimming	Men's 200 meter freestyle	July 25
Silver	Tim McKee	Swimming	Men's 400 meter individual medley	July 25
Silver	Lee James	Weightlifting	90 kilograms	July 25
Silver	Millard Hampton	Athletics	Men's 200 meters	July 26
Silver	United States women's national basketball team: Cynthia Brogdon; Nancy Dunkle; Lusia Harris; Patrica Head; Charlotte Lewis; Nancy Lieberman; Gail Marquis; Ann Elizabeth Meyers; Mary O'Connor; Patricia Roberts; Susan Rojcewicz; Juliene Simpson	Basketball	Women's tournament	July 26
Silver	Greg Louganis	Diving	Men's 10 meter platform	July 27
Silver	Walter Glasgow; Richard Hoepfner; John Kolius	Sailing	Soling	July 27
Silver	David McFaull; Michael Rothwell	Sailing	Tornado	July 28
Silver	Fred Newhouse	Athletics	Men's 400 meters	July 29
Silver	Randy Williams	Athletics	Men's long jump	July 29
Silver	James Butts	Athletics	Men's triple jump	July 30
Silver	Frank Shorter	Athletics	Men's marathon	July 31
Silver	Rosalyn Bryant; Sheila Ingram; Pamela Jiles; Debra Sapenter	Athletics	Women's 4 × 400 meter relay	July 31
Silver	Charles Mooney	Boxing	Bantamweight	July 31
Silver	Lloyd Keaser	Wrestling	Freestyle 68 kilograms	July 31
Silver	Ben Peterson	Wrestling	Freestyle 90 kilograms	July 31
Silver	Russell Hellickson	Wrestling	Freestyle 100 kilograms	July 31
Bronze	Bill Forrester	Swimming	Men's 200 meter butterfly	July 18
Bronze	Jim Montgomery	Swimming	Men's 200 meter freestyle	July 19
Bronze	Cynthia Potter	Diving	Women's 3 meter springboard	July 20
Bronze	Deborah Wilson	Diving	Women's 10 meter platform	July 20
Bronze	Gary Hall	Swimming	Men's 100 meter butterfly	July 21
Bronze	Wendy Boglioli	Swimming	Women's 100 meter butterfly	July 22
Bronze	Peter Kormann	Gymnastics	Men's floor	July 23
Bronze	Kathy Schmidt	Athletics	Women's javelin throw	July 24
Bronze	Carol Brown; Anita DeFrantz; Carie Graves; Marion Greig; Peggy McCarthy; Gail Ricketson; Lynn Silliman; Anne Warner; Jackie Zoch	Rowing	Women's eight	July 24
Bronze	Dan Harrigan	Swimming	Men's 200 meter backstroke	July 24
Bronze	Rick Colella	Swimming	Men's 200 meter breaststroke	July 24
Bronze	Richard Wohlhuter	Athletics	Men's 800 meters	July 25
Bronze	John Powell	Athletics	Men's discus throw	July 25
Bronze	Wendy Weinberg	Swimming	Women's 800 meter freestyle	July 25
Bronze	Dwayne Evans	Athletics	Men's 200 meters	July 26
Bronze	David Roberts	Athletics	Men's pole vault	July 26
Bronze	Allen Coage	Judo	+93 kilograms	July 26
Bronze	Dennis Conner; Conn Findlay	Sailing	Tempest	July 27
Bronze	Willie Davenport	Athletics	Men's 110 meter hurdles	July 28
Bronze	Herman Frazier	Athletics	Men's 400 meters	July 29
Bronze	Hilda Gurney; Edith Master; Dorothy Morkis	Equestrian	Team dressage	July 29
Bronze	Dwight Stones	Athletics	Men's high jump	July 31
Bronze	John Tate	Boxing	Heavyweight	July 31
Bronze	Gene Davis	Wrestling	Freestyle 62 kilograms	July 31
Bronze	Stanley Dziedzic	Wrestling	Freestyle 74 kilograms	July 31

Medals by sport
Sport	1st place, gold medalist(s)	2nd place, silver medalist(s)	3rd place, bronze medalist(s)	Total
Swimming	13	14	7	**34**
Athletics	6	8	8	**22**
Boxing	5	1	1	**7**
Diving	2	1	2	**5**
Equestrian	2	1	1	**4**
Shooting	2	1	0	**3**
Archery	2	0	0	**2**
Wrestling	1	3	2	**6**
Basketball	1	1	0	**2**
Rowing	0	2	1	**3**
Sailing	0	2	1	**3**
Weightlifting	0	1	0	**1**
Gymnastics	0	0	1	**1**
Judo	0	0	1	**1**
Total	34	35	25	94

Medals by day
Day	Date	1st place, gold medalist(s)	2nd place, silver medalist(s)	3rd place, bronze medalist(s)	Total
1	July 18	1	2	1	**4**
2	July 19	2	1	1	**4**
3	July 20	4	2	2	**8**
4	July 21	3	2	1	**6**
5	July 22	3	2	1	**6**
6	July 23	0	1	1	**2**
7	July 24	1	4	4	**9**
8	July 25	7	7	3	**17**
9	July 26	0	2	3	**5**
10	July 27	1	2	1	**4**
11	July 28	0	1	1	**2**
12	July 29	1	2	2	**5**
13	July 30	3	1	0	**4**
14	July 31	8	6	4	**18**
15	August 1	0	0	0	**0**
Total		34	35	25	94

Medals by gender
Gender	1st place, gold medalist(s)	2nd place, silver medalist(s)	3rd place, bronze medalist(s)	Total	Percentage
Male	30	26	18	**74**	78.72%
Female	3	9	7	**19**	20.22%
Mixed	1	0	0	**1**	1.06%
Total	34	35	25	94	100%

Multiple medalists
Name	Sport	1st place, gold medalist(s)	2nd place, silver medalist(s)	3rd place, bronze medalist(s)	Total
John Naber	Swimming	4	1	0	**5**
Shirley Babashoff	Swimming	1	4	0	**5**
Jim Montgomery	Swimming	3	0	1	**4**
John Hencken	Swimming	2	1	0	**3**
Peter Rocca	Swimming	1	2	0	**3**
Wendy Boglioli	Swimming	1	1	1	**3**
Mike Bruner	Swimming	2	0	0	**2**
Edmund Coffin	Equestrian	2	0	0	**2**
Bruce Furniss	Swimming	2	0	0	**2**
Brian Goodell	Swimming	2	0	0	**2**
Matt Vogel	Swimming	2	0	0	**2**
Jack Babashoff	Swimming	1	1	0	**2**
Joe Bottom	Swimming	1	1	0	**2**
Millard Hampton	Athletics	1	1	0	**2**
Fred Newhouse	Athletics	1	1	0	**2**
Michael Plumb	Equestrian	1	1	0	**2**
Tim Shaw	Swimming	1	1	0	**2**
Herman Frazier	Athletics	1	0	1	**2**

^{a} - Indicates that the athlete competed in preliminaries but not the final.

== Archery ==
After winning both gold medals in the first modern Olympic archery contest at the 1972 Summer Olympics, the US returned only one of the six archers who had competed in Munich, Linda Myers. Even though neither of the reigning gold medallists competed in Montreal, the United States again won both gold medals. Luann Ryon set new Olympic records for women's competition in both the single FITA round and the double FITA round categories. Darrell Pace did the same in the men's competition. All four of the American archers placed in the top eight.

Athlete	Event	Round 1		Round 2		Total	
Athlete	Event	Score	Rank	Score	Rank	Score	Rank
Richard McKinney	Men's individual	1230	2	1241	6	2471	4
Darrell Pace	Men's individual	1264	1	1307 OR	1	2571 OR	1st place, gold medalist(s)
Linda Myers	Women's individual	1180	9	1213	5	2393	7
Luann Ryon	Women's individual	1217	1	1282 OR	1	2499 OR	1st place, gold medalist(s)

== Athletics ==
Key

- Note–Ranks given for track events are within the athlete's heat only
- Q = Qualified for the next round
- q = Qualified for the next round as a fastest loser or, in field events, by position without achieving the qualifying target

Men
Road and track events

Athlete	Event	Heat		Quarterfinal		Semifinal		Final	
Athlete	Event	Time	Rank	Time	Rank	Time	Rank	Time	Rank
Harvey Glance	100 m	10.37	1 Q	10.23	1 Q	10.24	1 Q	10.19	4
Lam Jones	100 m	10.43	1 Q	10.46	2 Q	10.30	3 Q	10.27	6
Steve Riddick	100 m	10.43	1 Q	10.36	2 Q	10.33	5	Did not advance	
Dwayne Evans	200 m	20.96	1 Q	20.56	1 Q	20.83	2 Q	20.43	3rd place, bronze medalist(s)
Millard Hampton	200 m	21.11	1 Q	20.83	2 Q	20.69	2 Q	20.29	2nd place, silver medalist(s)
Mark Lutz	200 m	21.50	5	Did not advance					
Herman Frazier	400 m	46.09	1 Q	46.52	1 Q	45.24	3 Q	44.95	3rd place, bronze medalist(s)
Fred Newhouse	400 m	45.42	1 Q	45.97	1 Q	44.89	1 Q	44.40	2nd place, silver medalist(s)
Maxie Parks	400 m	46.12	1 Q	45.99	3 Q	45.61	3 Q	45.24	5
Mark Enyeart	800 m	1:47.96	3	—N/a		Did not advance			
James Robinson	800 m	1:47.56	2 Q	—N/a		1:46.435		Did not advance	
Rick Wohlhuter	800 m	1:45.71	1 Q	—N/a		1:46.72	1 Q	1:44.12	3rd place, bronze medalist(s)
Matt Centrowitz	1500 m	3:45.02	6	—N/a		Did not advance			
Mike Durkin	1500 m	3:38.89	5	—N/a		Did not advance			
Rick Wohlhuter	1500 m	3:39.94	3 Q	—N/a		3:38.71	2 Q	3:40.64	6
Dick Buerkle	5000 m	13:29.01	9	—N/a				Did not advance	
Paul Geis	5000 m	13:32.36	2 Q	—N/a				13:42.51	12
Duncan MacDonald	5000 m	13:47.14	7	—N/a				Did not advance	
Garry Bjorklund	10,000 m	28:12.24	2 Q	—N/a				28:38.08	13
Edward Mendoza	10,000 m	29:02.97	10	—N/a				Did not advance	
Craig Virgin	10,000 m	28:30.22	6	—N/a				Did not advance	
Willie Davenport	110 m hurdles	13.70	1 Q	—N/a		13.55	3 Q	13.38	3rd place, bronze medalist(s)
Charles Foster	110 m hurdles	13.68	1 Q	—N/a		13.45	1 Q	13.41	4
James Owens	110 m hurdles	14.03	5 Q	—N/a		13.76	4 Q	13.76	6
Edwin Moses	400 m hurdles	49.95	1 Q	—N/a		48.29	1 Q	47.63 WR	1st place, gold medalist(s)
Michael Shine	400 m hurdles	50.91	1 Q	—N/a		49.90	1 Q	48.69	2nd place, silver medalist(s)
Quentin Wheeler	400 m hurdles	50.32	1 Q	—N/a		50.22	4 Q	49.86	4
Doug Brown	3000 m steeplechase	8:33.25	8	—N/a				Did not advance	
Henry Marsh	3000 m steeplechase	8:31.46	6 Q	—N/a				8:23.99	10
Mike Roche	3000 m steeplechase	8:37.36	10	—N/a				Did not advance	
Harvey Glance; Lam Jones; Millard Hampton; Steve Riddick	4 × 100 m relay	38.76	1 Q	—N/a		38.51	1 Q	38.33	1st place, gold medalist(s)
Benny Brown; Herman Frazier; Fred Newhouse; Maxie Parks	4 × 400 m relay	2:59.52	1 Q	—N/a				2:58.65	1st place, gold medalist(s)
Don Kardong	Marathon	—N/a						2:11:15	4
Bill Rodgers	Marathon	—N/a						2:25:14	40
Frank Shorter	Marathon	—N/a						2:10:45	2nd place, silver medalist(s)
Ron Laird	20 km walk	—N/a						1:33:27.6	20
Todd Scully	20 km walk	—N/a						1:36:37.4	29
Larry Walker	20 km walk	—N/a						1:34:19.4	22

Field events

Athlete	Event	Qualification		Final	
Athlete	Event	Result	Rank	Result	Rank
Larry Myricks	Long jump	7.92	3 Q	DNS	
Arnie Robinson	Long jump	7.95	2 Q	8.35	1st place, gold medalist(s)
Randy Williams	Long jump	7.97	1 Q	8.35	2nd place, silver medalist(s)
James Butts	Triple jump	16.55	5 Q	17.17	2nd place, silver medalist(s)
Rayfield Dupree	Triple jump	16.50	8 Q	16.23	12
Tommy Haynes	Triple jump	16.62	4 Q	16.78	5
James Barrineau	High jump	2.16	=1 Q	2.14	11
William Jankunis	High jump	2.16	=3 Q	2.10	13
Dwight Stones	High jump	2.16	10	2.21	3rd place, bronze medalist(s)
Earl Bell	Pole vault	5.10	=1 Q	5.45	6
Terry Porter	Pole vault	5.10	=1 Q	5.20	=13
Dave Roberts	Pole vault	5.10	=1 Q	5.50	3rd place, bronze medalist(s)
Al Feuerbach	Shot put	19.87	6 Q	20.55	4
Peter Shmock	Shot put	19.48	10 Q	19.89	9
George Woods	Shot put	19.35	12 q	20.26	7
John Powell	Discus throw	61.48	9 Q	65.70	3rd place, bronze medalist(s)
Jay Silvester	Discus throw	62.06	6 Q	61.98	8
Mac Wilkins	Discus throw	68.28 OR	1 Q	67.50	1st place, gold medalist(s)
Sam Colson	Javelin throw	86.64	4 Q	86.16	5
Richard George	Javelin throw	78.32	18	Did not advance	
Antony Hall	Javelin throw	79.56	15 Q	71.70	15
Larry Hart	Hammer throw	67.74	15	Did not advance	

Combined event – Decathlon

Athlete	Event	100 m	LJ	SP	HJ	400 m	110H	DT	PV	JT	1500 m	Points	Rank
Fred Dixon	Result	10.94	6.91	14.44	2.03	48.38	18.11	45.82	NM	55.96	4:38.49	6754	23
Fred Dixon	Points	819	802	755	882	880	574	797	0	711	534	6754	23
Bruce Jenner	Result	10.94	7.22	15.35	2.03	47.51	14.84	50.04	4.80	68.52	4:12.61	8618 WR	1st place, gold medalist(s)
Bruce Jenner	Points	819	865	809	882	923	866	873	1005	862	714	8618 WR	1st place, gold medalist(s)
Fred Samara	Result	10.85	7.08	13.00	1.84	50.07	14.87	40.54	4.30	53.60	4:40.21	7504	15
Fred Samara	Points	841	836	665	716	801	862	696	884	680	523	7504	15

Women
Track events

Athlete	Event	Heat		Quarterfinal		Semifinal		Final	
Athlete	Event	Time	Rank	Time	Rank	Time	Rank	Time	Rank
Evelyn Ashford	100 m	11.25	3 Q	11.28	1 Q	11.21	2 Q	11.24	5
Chandra Cheeseborough	100 m	11.25	1 Q	11.36	2 Q	11.26	3 Q	11.31	6
Brenda Morehead	100 m	11.35	1 Q	11.30	2 Q	11.38	6	Did not advance	
Debra Armstrong	200 m	23.18	1 Q	23.20	2 Q	26.16	6	Did not advance	
Chandra Cheeseborough	200 m	23.17	1 Q	23.19	2 Q	23.20	6	Did not advance	
Rosalyn Bryant	400 m	52.01	1 Q	51.74	2 Q	50.62	1 Q	50.65	5
Sheila Ingram	400 m	51.83	1 Q	51.31	1 Q	50.90	3 Q	50.90	6
Debra Sapenter	400 m	52.33	1 Q	21.23	1 Q	51.34	4 Q	51.66	8
Wendy Koenig	800 m	1:59.91	3 Q	—N/a		2:02.31	7	Did not advance	
Madeline Manning	800 m	2:00.62	3 Q	—N/a		2:07.25	8	Did not advance	
Kathy Weston	800 m	2:03.31	5	—N/a		Did not advance			
Francie Larrieu	1500 m	4:07.21	6 q	—N/a		4:09.07	9	Did not advance	
Jan Merrill	1500 m	4:10.92	3 Q	—N/a		4:02.61	5 q	4:08.54	8
Cyndy Poor	1500 m	4:08.89	6	—N/a		Did not advance			
Rhonda Brady	100 m hurdles	13.84	5	—N/a		Did not advance			
Patrice Donnelly	100 m hurdles	13.71	5	—N/a		Did not advance			
Deby LaPlante	100 m hurdles	13.51	4 Q	—N/a		13.36	6	Did not advance	
Debra Armstrong; Evelyn Ashford; Chandra Cheeseborough; Martha Watson	4 × 100 m relay	43.46	2 Q	—N/a				46.35	7
Rosalyn Bryant; Sheila Ingram; Pamela Jiles; Debra Sapenter	4 × 400 m relay	3:25.15	2 Q	—N/a				3:22.81	2nd place, silver medalist(s)

Field events

Athlete	Event	Qualification		Final	
Athlete	Event	Result	Rank	Result	Rank
Kathy McMillan	Long jump	6.25	10 Q	6.66	2nd place, silver medalist(s)
Sherron Walker	Long jump	6.20	14	Did not advance	
Martha Watson	Long jump	5.93	25	Did not advance	
Paula Girven	High jump	1.80	21 Q	1.84	18
Joni Huntley	High jump	1.80	2 Q	1.89	5
Pam Spencer	High jump	1.70	27	Did not advance	
Maren Seidler	Shot put	—N/a		15.60	12
Lynne Winbigler	Discus throw	48.22	14	Did not advance	
Sherry Calvert	Javelin throw	53.08	13	Did not advance	
Kate Schmidt	Javelin throw	61.50	3 Q	63.96	3rd place, bronze medalist(s)
Karin Smith	Javelin throw	53.96	6 q	57.50	8

Combined event – Pentathlon

Athlete	Event	100H	SP	HJ	LJ	200 m	Points	Rank
Gale Fitzgerald	Result	14.16	12.51	1.68	5.89	24.73	4263	13
Gale Fitzgerald	Points	846	750	915	882	870	4263	13
Jane Frederick	Result	13.54	14.55	1.76	5.99	24.70	4566	7
Jane Frederick	Points	926	870	993	904	873	4566	7
Marilyn King	Result	14.45	12.27	1.74	5.62	25.27	4165	17
Marilyn King	Points	811	736	974	821	823	4165	17

== Basketball ==
Summary

Team	Event	Preliminary round						Semifinal	Final / BM	
Team	Event	Opposition Result	Opposition Result	Opposition Result	Opposition Result	Opposition Result	Rank	Opposition Result	Opposition Result	Rank
United States men	Men's tournament	Italy; W 106–86	Puerto Rico; W 95–94	Yugoslavia; W 112–93	Egypt; W 2–0	Czechoslovakia; W 81–76	1 Q	Canada; W 96–77	Yugoslavia; W 95–74	1st place, gold medalist(s)
United States women	Women's tournament	Japan; L 71–84	Bulgaria; W 95–79	Canada; W 89–75	Soviet Union; L 77–112	Czechoslovakia; W 83–67	2	—N/a		2nd place, silver medalist(s)

=== Men's tournament ===
Roster

- Phil Ford
- Steve Sheppard
- Adrian Dantley
- Walter Davis
- William "Quinn" Buckner
- Ernie Grunfeld
- Kenneth Carr
- Scott May
- Michel Armstrong
- Thomas LaGarde
- Philip Hubbard
- Mitchell Kupchak
- Head coach: Dean Smith

Preliminary round

Pos	Team	Pld	W	L	PF	PA	PD	Pts	Qualification
1	United States	5	5	0	396	349	+47	10	Semifinals
2	Yugoslavia	5	4	1	366	343	+23	9	Semifinals
3	Italy	5	3	2	349	344	+5	8	5th–8th classification round
4	Czechoslovakia	5	2	3	418	406	+12	7	5th–8th classification round
5	Puerto Rico	5	1	4	323	363	−40	6	9th–12th classification round
6	Egypt	5	0	5	64	111	−47	5	9th–12th classification round

Source: FIBA archive
Rules for classification: 1) points; 2) head-to-head points; 3) head-to-head goal average; 4) head-to-head number of points scored.

July 18

Italy	86–106	United States

Centre Étienne Desmarteau, Montreal

July 20

United States	95–94	Puerto Rico

Centre Étienne Desmarteau, Montreal

July 21

Yugoslavia	93–112	United States

Centre Étienne Desmarteau, Montreal

July 22

Forfeited

United States	2–0	Egypt

Centre Étienne Desmarteau, Montreal

July 24

United States	81–76	Czechoslovakia

Centre Étienne Desmarteau, Montreal

Semifinal

July 26, 1976

United States	95–77	Canada

Montreal Forum, Montreal

Gold medal game

July 27, 1976

United States	94–74	Yugoslavia

Montreal Forum, Montreal

=== Women's tournament ===
Roster

- Cindy Brogdon
- Susan Rojcewicz
- Ann Meyers
- Lusia Harris
- Nancy Dunkle
- Charlotte Lewis
- Nancy Lieberman
- Gail Marquis
- Patricia Roberts
- Mary Anne O'Connor
- Patricia Head
- Julienne Simpson
- Head coach: Billie Moore

Pos	Team	Pld	W	L	PF	PA	PD	Pts
1	Soviet Union	5	5	0	504	346	+158	10
2	United States	5	3	2	415	417	−2	8
3	Bulgaria	5	3	2	365	377	−12	8
4	Czechoslovakia	5	2	3	351	359	−8	7
5	Japan	5	2	3	405	400	+5	7
6	Canada (H)	5	0	5	336	477	−141	5

Source: FIBA archive
Rules for classification: 1) points; 2) head-to-head points; 3) head-to-head goal average; 4) head-to-head number of points scored.
(H) Hosts

July 19

United States	71–84	Japan

Centre Étienne Desmarteau, Montreal

July 20

United States	95–79	Bulgaria

Centre Étienne Desmarteau, Montreal

July 22

United States	89–75	Canada

Centre Étienne Desmarteau, Montreal

July 23

United States	77–112	Soviet Union

Centre Étienne Desmarteau, Montreal

July 26

United States	83–67	Czechoslovakia

Montreal Forum, Montreal

== Boxing ==
Athlete	Event	Round 1	Round 2	Round 3	Quarterfinal	Semifinal	Final	
Athlete	Event	Opposition Result	Opposition Result	Opposition Result	Opposition Result	Opposition Result	Opposition Result	Rank
Louis Curtis	Light flyweight	Średnicki (POL); L 0–5	Did not advance	—N/a	Did not advance			=17
Leo Randolph	Flyweight	Bye		Gruescu (ROM); W 4–1	Larmour (IRL); W 4–1	Błażyński (POL); W 4–1	Duvalón (CUB); W 3–2	1st place, gold medalist(s)
Charles Mooney	Bantamweight	Rais (MAR); W 5–0	Rodríguez (ESP); W 4–1	Onori (ITA); W 5–0	Chul (KOR); W 3–2	Rybakov (URS); W 4–1	Gu (PRK); L 0–5	2nd place, silver medalist(s)
Davey Armstrong	Featherweight	Bye	Volkov (URS); W 5–0	Badari (HUN); W 5–0	Herrera (CUB); L 2–3	Did not advance		=5
Howard Davis Jr.	Lightweight	Bye		Asprilla (COL); W RSC	Tsvetkov (BUL); W RSC	Rusevski (YUG); W 5–0	Cuțov (ROM); W 5–0	1st place, gold medalist(s)
Ray Leonard	Light welterweight	Carlsson (SWE); W 5–0	Limasov (URS); W 5–0	McKenzie (GBR); W 5–0	Beyer (GDR); W 5–0	Szczerba (POL); W 5–0	Aldama (CUB); W 5–0	1st place, gold medalist(s)
Clinton Jackson	Welterweight	Bye	Kicka (POL); W 5–0	Felix (HAI); W KO	Gamarro (VEN); L 2–3	Did not advance		=5
Chuck Walker	Light middleweight	Bye	Rybicki (POL); L 2–3	—N/a	Did not advance			=9
Michael Spinks	Middleweight	Bye		—N/a	Pasiewicz (POL); W 5–0	Năstac (ROM); W WO	Riskiyev (URS); W RSC	1st place, gold medalist(s)
Leon Spinks	Light heavyweight	Fatihi (MAR); W KO	Klimanov (URS); W 5–0	—N/a	Sachse (GDR); W 5–0	Gortat (POL); W 5–0	Soria (CUB); W RSC	1st place, gold medalist(s)
John Tate	Heavyweight	Bye	Biegalski (POL); W 5–0	—N/a	Hussing (FRG); W 3–2	Stevenson (CUB); L KO	Did not advance	3rd place, bronze medalist(s)

== Canoeing ==
Men

Athlete	Event	Heat		Repechage		Semifinal		Final	
Athlete	Event	Time	Rank	Time	Rank	Time	Rank	Time	Rank
Angus Morrison	C-1 500 m	4:56.70	6 R	2:12.92	5	Did not advance			
Angus Morrison	C-1 1000 m	4:35.77	7 R	4:18.11	2 SF	4:25.83	4	Did not advance	
Roland Muhlen; Andreas Weigand	C-2 500 m	2:00.99	5 R	1:57.58	3 SF	1:52.33	4	Did not advance	
Chuck Lyda; András Törő	C-2 1000 m	4:21.19	7 R	4:04.95	5	Did not advance			
Henry Krawczyk	K-1 500 m	2:04.84	6 R	2:03.25	4	Did not advance			
David Gilman	K-1 1000 m	4:05.38	4 R	4:16.10	1 SF	3:54.12	5	Did not advance	
Michael Johnson; William Leach	K-2 500 m	1:55.10	8 R	1:49.95	4	Did not advance			
Bruce Barton; Peter Deyo	K-2 1000 m	3:36.17	4 R	3:36.32	3 SF	3:41.35	6	Did not advance	
Bruce Barton; Peter Deyo; Stephen Kelly; Brent Turner	K-4 1000 m	3:18.12	5 R	3:11.71	4	Did not advance			

Women

Athlete	Event	Heat		Repechage		Semifinal		Final	
Athlete	Event	Time	Rank	Time	Rank	Time	Rank	Time	Rank
Julie Leach	K-1 500 m	2:13.00	2 SF	Bye		2:09.44	3 QF	2:06.92	7
Linda Murray-Dragan; Ann Turner	K-2 500 m	1:59.32	4 R	1:59.15	1 SF	1:57.10	4	Did not advance	

Key: QF – Qualified to medal final; SF – Qualified to semifinal; R – Qualified to repechage

== Cycling ==
Thirteen cyclists represented the United States in 1976.

=== Road ===
Athlete	Event	Time	Rank
David Boll	Road race	5:05:00	56
John Howard	Road race	4:54:26	42
George Mount	Road race	4:47:23	6
Michael Neel	Road race	DNF	
John Howard; Alan Kingsberry; Wayne Stetina; Marc Thompson	Team time trial	2:18:53	19

=== Track ===
Pursuit

Athlete	Event	Qualifying		Round 1	Quarterfinal	Semifinal	Final / BM	
Athlete	Event	Time	Rank	Opposition Result	Opposition Result	Opposition Result	Opposition Result	Rank
Leonard Nitz	Individual pursuit	5:01.54	19	Did not advance				
Paul Deem; Leonard Nitz; Ron Skarin; Ralph Therrio	Team pursuit		10	—N/a	Did not advance			

Sprint

Athlete	Event	Round 1	Repechage 1	Round 2	Repechage 2	Repechage 3	Quarterfinal	Semifinal	Final / BM / Pl.	
Athlete	Event	Opposition Result	Opposition Result	Opposition Result	Opposition Result	Opposition Result	Opposition Result	Opposition Result	Opposition Result	Rank
Leigh Barczewski	Sprint	Spencer (ANT), Vaarten (BEL); L	Gadd (GBR); L DQ	Did not advance						19

Time trial

Athlete	Event	Time	Rank
Robert Vehe	1 km time trial	1:09.057	15

== Diving ==
Men

Athlete	Event	Preliminary		Final	
Athlete	Event	Points	Rank	Points	Rank
Phil Boggs	3 m springboard	621.51	1 Q	619.05	1st place, gold medalist(s)
Robert Cragg	3 m springboard	582.99	2 Q	548.19	5
Greg Louganis	3 m springboard	530.85	8 Q	528.96	6
Greg Louganis	10 m platform	583.50	1 Q	576.99	2nd place, silver medalist(s)
Tim Moore	10 m platform	510.75	8 Q	538.17	5
Kent Vosler	10 m platform	554.37	3 Q	544.14	4

Women

Athlete	Event	Preliminary		Final	
Athlete	Event	Points	Rank	Points	Rank
Jennifer Chandler	3 m springboard	463.32	1 Q	506.19	1st place, gold medalist(s)
Barbara Nejman	3 m springboard	455.49	2 Q	365.07	8
Cynthia Potter	3 m springboard	455.16	3 Q	466.83	3rd place, bronze medalist(s)
Melissa Briley	10 m platform	389.85	4 Q	376.86	7
Janet Ely	10 m platform	343.92	9	Did not advance	
Debbie Wilson	10 m platform	398.37	3 Q	401.07	3rd place, bronze medalist(s)

== Equestrian ==
Dressage

Athlete	Horse	Event	Grand Prix		Grand Prix Special	
Athlete	Horse	Event	Points	Rank	Points	Rank
Hilda Gurney	Keen	Individual	1607	4 Q	1167	10
Edith Master	Dahlwitz	Individual	1481	14	Did not advance	
Dorothy Morkis	Monaco	Individual	1559	7 Q	1249	5
Hilda Gurney; Edith Master; Dorothy Morkis	as above	Team	4647	3rd place, bronze medalist(s)	—N/a	

Eventing

Athlete	Horse	Event	Dressage		Cross-country		Jumping		Total	
Athlete	Horse	Event	Faults	Rank	Faults	Rank	Faults	Rank	Faults	Rank
Edmund Coffin	Bally-Cor	Individual	64.59	6	50.40	2	0.00	=1	114.99	1st place, gold medalist(s)
Bruce Davidson	Irish-Cap	Individual	54.16	2	136.00	20	10.00	=14	200.16	10
Michael Plumb	Better & Better	Individual	66.25	7	49.60	1	10.00	=14	125.85	2nd place, silver medalist(s)
Mary Anne Tauskey	Marcus Aurelius	Individual	97.09	34	162.40	24	10.00	=14	269.49	21
Edmund Coffin; Bruce Davidson; Michael Plumb; Mary Anne Tauskey	as above	Team	185.00	2	236.00	1	20.00	=3	441.00	1st place, gold medalist(s)

Jumping

Athlete	Horse	Event	Round 1		Round 2		Total		Jump off	
Athlete	Horse	Event	Faults	Rank	Faults	Rank	Faults	Rank	Faults	Rank
Buddy Brown	A Little Bit	Individual	16.50	29	Did not advance		16.50	29	Did not advance	
Frank Chapot	Viscount	Individual	4.00	=2 Q	12.00	=7	16.00	=5	Did not advance	
Dennis Murphy	Do Right	Individual	12.00	=22	Did not advance		12.00	=22	Did not advance	
Buddy Brown; Frank Chapot; Michael R. Matz; Robert Ridland	Sandsablaze; Viscount; Grande; Southside	Team	40.00	7 Q	24.00	3	64.00	4	—N/a	

== Fencing ==
18 fencers represented the United States in 1976.

Individual
Men

Athlete	Event	Round 1 pool		Round 2 pool		Semifinal pool		Elimination rounds					Final pool	
Athlete	Event	Round 1 pool		Round 2 pool		Semifinal pool		Round 1	Round 2	Barrage 1	Barrage 2	Barrage 3	Final pool	
Athlete	Event	W–L	Rank	W–L	Rank	W–L	Rank	Opposition Result	Opposition Result	Opposition Result	Opposition Result	Opposition Result	W–L	Rank
Edward Ballinger	Foil	3–2	2 Q	3–2	3 Q	2–3	5	Did not advance						=17
Edward Donofrio	Foil	4–1	3 Q	3–2	4 Q	1–4	4 Q	Dal Zotto (ITA); L 4–10	Did not advance	Pietruszka (FRA); L 5–10	Did not advance			=13
Martin Lang	Foil	2–3	4 Q	0–5	6	Did not advance								35
Scotty Bozek	Épée	2–2	4	Did not advance										41
Brooke Makler	Épée	2–3	4	Did not advance										44
George Masin	Épée	2–3	=4	Did not advance										=46
Paul Apostol	Sabre	2–2	3 Q	2–3	4 Q	2–3	4 Q	Krovopuskov (URS); L 4–10	Did not advance	Irimiciuc (ROM); L 6–10	Did not advance			=13
Stephen Kaplan	Sabre	2–2	3 Q	1–4	5	Did not advance								28
Peter Westbrook	Sabre	3–1	2 Q	3–2	2 Q	2–3	4 Q	Nazlymov (URS); L 4–10	Did not advance	Bierkowski (POL); L 8–10	Did not advance			=13

Women

Athlete	Event	Round 1 pool		Round 2 pool		Semifinal pool		Elimination rounds					Final pool	
Athlete	Event	Round 1 pool		Round 2 pool		Semifinal pool		Round 1	Round 2	Barrage 1	Barrage 2	Barrage 3	Final pool	
Athlete	Event	W–L	Rank	W–L	Rank	W–L	Rank	Opposition Result	Opposition Result	Opposition Result	Opposition Result	Opposition Result	W–L	Rank
Sheila Armstrong	Foil	1–4	5	Did not advance										41
Nikki Franke	Foil	2–3	5	Did not advance										38
Ann O'Donnell	Foil	0–4	5	Did not advance										44

Team

Athlete	Event	Round 1				Round 2	Quarterfinal	Semifinal	Final / BM / Pl.	
Athlete	Event	Opposition Result	Opposition Result	Opposition Result	Rank	Opposition Result	Opposition Result	Opposition Result	Opposition Result	Rank
Edward Ballinger; Edward Donofrio; Martin Lang; Brooke Makler; Ed Wright	Men's foil	Hong Kong; W 15–1	Poland; L 2–9	Iran; W 12–4	2 Q	—N/a	Italy; L 3–9	Did not advance	Placement final Great Britain; L 7–8	=7
Scotty Bozek; Brooke Makler; George Masin; Paul Pesthy	Men's épée	Thailand; W 9–4	Romania; L 5–10	Soviet Union; L 4–12	3	Did not advance				=11
Paul Apostol; Stephen Kaplan; Thomas Losonczy; Alex Orban; Peter Westbrook	Men's sabre	Canada; W 9–7	Italy; L 3–9	—N/a	2 Q	—N/a	Soviet Union; L 1–9	Did not advance	Placement final Poland; L 3–9	=7
Sheila Armstrong; Gay D'Asaro; Nikki Franke; Denise O'Connor; Ann O'Donnell	Women's foil	Iran; W 11–5	Great Britain; L 7–9	Italy; L 2–14	3	—N/a	Did not advance			=9

== Gymnastics ==
Men
Team

Athlete	Event	Apparatus												Total	
Athlete	Event	F		PH		R		V		PB		HB		Total	
Athlete	Event	C	O	C	O	C	O	C	O	C	O	C	O	Score	Rank
Marshall Avener	Team	8.65	8.95	9.20	9.50	9.20	8.95	9.05	9.20	9.20	9.05	9.10	9.40	109.45	43
Tom Beach	Team	8.95	9.20	8.85	9.20	9.20	9.40	9.20	9.30	9.15	9.00	9.45	9.65	110.55	32
Bart Conner	Team	8.95	8.95	8.55	8.70	8.95	9.20	9.20	9.30	9.55	9.40	9.40	9.20	109.35	46
Peter Kormann	Team	9.30	9.70 q	9.00	9.40	9.05	9.15	9.10	9.25	9.05	9.05	9.20	9.50	110.75	31 Q
Kurt Thomas	Team	9.10	9.55	9.25	9.70	9.05	9.25	9.20	8.45	9.40	9.30	9.30	9.50	111.05	30 Q
Wayne Young	Team	8.90	9.30	9.05	9.40	9.30	9.60	9.20	9.40	9.35	9.20	9.35	9.50	111.55	27 Q
Total	Team	91.90		92.55		92.40		92.35		92.65		94.25		556.10	7

Individual finals

Athlete	Event	Apparatus												Total	
Athlete	Event	F		PH		R		V		PB		HB		Total	
Athlete	Event	P	F	P	F	P	F	P	F	P	F	P	F	Score	Rank
Peter Kormann	All-around	9.500	9.650	9.200	9.300	9.100	9.500	9.175	9.600	9.050	9.450	9.350	9.600	112.475	15
Kurt Thomas	All-around	9.325	9.200	9.475	9.300	9.150	9.400	8.825	9.100	9.350	9.050	9.400	9.600	111.175	21
Wayne Young	All-around	9.100	9.550	9.225	9.550	9.450	9.600	9.300	9.550	9.275	9.450	9.425	9.550	113.025	12
Peter Kormann	Floor	9.500	9.800	—N/a										19.300	3rd place, bronze medalist(s)

Women
Team

Athlete	Event	Apparatus								Total	
Athlete	Event	V		UB		BB		F		Total	
Athlete	Event	C	O	C	O	C	O	C	O	Score	Rank
Kolleen Casey	Team	9.50	9.45	9.45	9.60	9.15	8.65	9.40	9.30	74.50	41
Kimberly Chace	Team	9.50	9.35	9.55	9.75	9.20	9.25	9.35	9.50	75.45	24 Q
Carrie Englert	Team	9.20	9.30	9.40	9.40	9.30	8.85	9.35	9.60	74.40	42
Kathy Howard	Team	9.25	9.20	9.25	9.55	9.00	8.70	9.50	9.70	74.15	46
Debra Willcox	Team	9.60	9.45	9.60	9.50	9.20	9.15	9.15	9.40	75.05	=29 Q
Leslie Wolfsberger	Team	9.30	9.30	9.60	9.70	9.20	8.65	9.25	9.65	74.65	=34 Q
Total	Team	94.00		95.70		90.65		94.70		375.05	6

Individual finals

Athlete	Event	Apparatus								Total	
Athlete	Event	V		UB		BB		F		Total	
Athlete	Event	P	F	P	F	P	F	P	F	Score	Rank
Kimberly Chace	All-around	9.425	9.500	9.650	9.700	9.225	9.450	9.425	9.500	75.875	14
Debra Willcox	All-around	9.525	9.600	9.550	9.450	9.175	9.250	9.275	9.500	75.325	=18
Leslie Wolfsberger	All-around	9.300	9.400	9.650	9.600	8.925	9.450	9.450	9.550	75.325	=18

== Handball ==
Summary

Team	Event	Preliminary round					Final / BM / Pl.	
Team	Event	Opposition Result	Opposition Result	Opposition Result	Opposition Result	Rank	Opposition Result	Rank
United States men	Men's tournament	Romania; L 19–32	Poland; L 20–26	Hungary; L 21–36	Czechoslovakia; L 20–28	5	9th place final Japan; L 20–27	10

=== Men ===
Roster

- Richard Abrahamson
- Roger Baker
- Peter Buehning, Jr.
- Randolph Dean
- Robert Dean
- Vincent DiCalogero
- Ezra Glantz
- William Johnson
- Patrick O'Neill
- Sandor Rivnyak
- James Rogers
- Kevin Serrapede
- Robert Sparks
- Harry Winkler
- Coach: Dennis Berkholtz

Preliminary round

Pos	Team	Pld	W	D	L	GF	GA	GD	Pts	Qualification
1	Romania	4	3	1	0	91	71	+20	7	Gold medal game
2	Poland	4	3	0	1	80	71	+9	6	Bronze medal game
3	Hungary	4	2	0	2	92	82	+10	4	Fifth place game
4	Czechoslovakia	4	1	1	2	85	82	+3	3	Seventh place game
5	United States	4	0	0	4	80	122	−42	0	Ninth place game
–	Tunisia (Note: Tunisia withdrew after 2 matches.)	0	0	0	0	0	0	0	0	Withdrawn

Notes:

18 July 1976; 20:30	Czechoslovakia	28–20	United States	PEPS, Quebec City
18 July 1976; 20:30	Jarý 5	(15–13)	Abrahamson 7	PEPS, Quebec City

20 July 1976; 19:00	Romania	32–19	United States	PEPS, Quebec City; Referees: Rodil, Ohlsen (DEN)
20 July 1976; 19:00	Birtalan 8	(16–8)	Abrahamson, Rogers 5	PEPS, Quebec City; Referees: Rodil, Ohlsen (DEN)

22 July 1976; 20:30	Hungary	36–21	United States	Complexe sportif Claude-Robillard, Montreal
22 July 1976; 20:30	Varga 9	(18–9)	Ra. Dean 6	Complexe sportif Claude-Robillard, Montreal

24 July 1976; 19:00	Poland	26–20	United States	Complexe sportif Claude-Robillard, Montreal
24 July 1976; 19:00	Klempel, Przybysz 8	(14–10)	Rogers 8	Complexe sportif Claude-Robillard, Montreal

9th place game

27 July 1976; 14:00	Japan	27–20	United States	Complexe sportif Claude-Robillard, Montreal
27 July 1976; 14:00	three players 5	(12–8)	Ra. Dean 6	Complexe sportif Claude-Robillard, Montreal

== Judo ==
Athlete	Event	Round of 64	Round of 32	Round of 16	Quarterfinal	Semifinal	Repechage 1	Repechage 2	Final / BM	
Athlete	Event	Opposition Result	Opposition Result	Opposition Result	Opposition Result	Opposition Result	Opposition Result	Opposition Result	Opposition Result	Rank
Joseph Bost	–63 kg	—N/a	Alexander (GBR); L 0000–0001	Did not advance						=18
Patrick Burris	–70 kg	—N/a	Miranda (PUR); W 1000–0000	Vial (FRA); L 0000–0001	Did not advance					=13
Teimoc Johnston-Ono	–80 kg	—N/a	Bye	Jatowitt (AUT); L 0000–0100	Did not advance					=13
Thomas Martin	–93 kg	Bye	Þorsteinsson (ISL); W 1000–0000	Röthlisberger (SUI); L 0000–0010	Did not advance					=12
Allen Coage	+93 kg	—N/a	Bye	Felipa (AHO); W 1000–0000	Wallas (AUT); W 0010–0000	Neureuther (FRG); L 0000–0000 Y	—N/a	Bye	Bronze medal final Jalaa (MGL); W 0200–0000	3rd place, bronze medalist(s)
Jimmy Wooley	Open	—N/a	Schädler (LIE); W 1000–0000	Novák (TCH); L 0000–1000	Did not advance					=11

== Modern pentathlon ==
Three pentathletes represented the United States in 1976.

Athlete	Event	Riding (cross-country steeplechase)				Fencing (épée)			Shooting (25 m rapid fire pistol)			Swimming (300 m freestyle)			Running (4000 m cross-country)			Total	
Athlete	Event	Time	Penalties	Rank	MP points	V–D	Rank	MP points	Time	Rank	MP points	Score	Rank	MP points	Time	Rank	MP points	MP points	Rank
Michael Burley	Individual	1:47.5	32	18	1068	22–24	=24	760	180	=41	692	3:27.95	10	1212	12:26.6	2	1327	5059	16
John Fitzgerald	Individual	1:48.0	64	27	1036	30–16	4	952	194	=7	1000	3:25.47	8	1232	13:53.4	42	1066	5286	6
Robert Nieman	Individual	1:49.6	64	28	1036	23–23	=18	784	176	44	604	3:13.61	1	1324	13:24.2	24	1153	4901	26
Michael Burley; John Fitzgerald; Robert Nieman	Team	—N/a		7	3140	—N/a	4	2535	—N/a	12	2296	—N/a	1	3768	—N/a	7	3546	15285	5

== Rowing ==
Men

Athlete	Event	Heat		Repechage		Semifinal		Final	
Athlete	Event	Time	Rank	Time	Rank	Time	Rank	Time	Rank
Jim Dietz	Single sculls	7:24.98	5 R	7:14.46	3 SF	7:09.13	5 FB	7:58.70	7
Calvin Coffey; Mike Staines	Coxless pair	6:52.37	2 SF	Bye		6:33.25	1 FA	7:26.73	2nd place, silver medalist(s)
Ken Dreyfuss; John Matthews; Darrell Vreugdenhil	Coxed pair	7:49.00	5 R	N/A	2 SF	7:24.78	6 FB	8:15.65	11
Bill Belden; Lawrence Klecatsky	Double sculls	6:46.33	4 R	6:34.81	1 SF	6:33.88	4 FB	7:16.59	8
Tony Brooks; Jim Moroney; Gary Piantedosi; Hugh Stevenson	Coxless four	6:15.07	1 SF	Bye		6:03.79	4 FB	6:43.06	8
Fred Borchelt; John Hartigan; Pat Hayes; Michael Plumb; Robert Zagunis	Coxed four	6:36.52	3 SF	Bye		6:14.87	4 FB	6:54.92	11
Peter Cortes; Kenneth Foote; Neil Halleen; John Van Blom	Quadruple sculls	5:55.05	3 R	5:55.23	2 FA	—N/a		6:34.33	6
Richard Cashin; Steve Christiansen; John Everett; David Fellows; Michael Hess; Chip Lubsen; Mark Norelius; Alan Shealy; David Weinberg	Eight	5:42.05	3 R	5:48.60	3 FB	—N/a		6:11.07	9

Women

Athlete	Event	Heat		Repechage		Final	
Athlete	Event	Time	Rank	Time	Rank	Time	Rank
Joan Lind	Single sculls	3:40.67	2 R	4:03.87	1 FA	4:06.21	2nd place, silver medalist(s)
Sue Morgan; Laura Staines	Pair	3:46.76	4 R	3:58.41	3 FB	4:02.91	7
Diane Braceland; Jan Palchikoff	Double sculls	3:33.15	5 R	3:45.19	2 FA	3:58.25	5
Pam Behrens; Judy Geer; Mimi Kellogg; Catherine Menges; Nancy Storrs	Four	3:32.77	3 R	N/A	4 FA	3:56.50	6
Lisa Hansen; Liz Hills; Karen McCloskey; Irene Moreno	Quadruple sculls	3:18.02	4 R	3:27.82	3 FB	3:46.06	7
Carol Brown; Anita DeFrantz; Carie Graves; Marion Greig; Peggy McCarthy; Gail Ricketson; Lynn Silliman; Anne Warner; Jackie Zoch	Eight	3:05.52	2 R	N/A	1 FA	3:38.68	3rd place, bronze medalist(s)

Qualification legend: FA = Final A (medal); FB = Final B (non-medal); SF = Semifinal; R = Repechage

== Sailing ==
Athlete	Event	Race							Total	
Athlete	Event	1	2	3	4	5	6	7	Points	Rank
Peter Commette	Finn	15.0	18.0	11.7	~~20.0~~	19.0	19.0	13.0	95.7	11
David Whitehurst; Robert Whitehurst	470	17.0	~~RET~~	10.0	0.0	22.0	22.0	18.0	89.0	9
Norman Freeman; John Mathias	Flying Dutchman	11.7	~~19.0~~	15.0	13.0	8.0	0.0	18.0	65.7	6
David McFaull; Michael Rothwell	Tornado	14.0	~~16.0~~	0.0	8.0	3.0	3.0	8.0	36.0	2nd place, silver medalist(s)
Dennis Conner; Conn Findlay	Tempest	3.0	3.0	5.7	10.0	~~15.0~~	8.0	3.0	32.7	3rd place, bronze medalist(s)
Walter Glasgow; Richard Hoepfner; John Kolius	Soling	14.0	5.7	~~17.0~~	3.0	13.0	11.7	0.0	47.4	2nd place, silver medalist(s)

- Alternate:Dick Tillman

== Shooting ==
Athlete	Event	Score	Rank
Hershel Anderson	50 m pistol	556	10
Richard Crawford	50 m pistol	534	=37
Bill McMillan	25 m rapid fire pistol	586	=20
Tom Treinen	25 m rapid fire pistol	576	=36
Martin Edmondson	50 m running target	558	14
Louis Theimer	50 m running target	564	8
Victor Auer	50 m rifle prone	588	=31
David Ross	50 m rifle prone	590	=20
Lanny Bassham	50 m rifle three positions	1162	1st place, gold medalist(s)
Margaret Murdock	50 m rifle three positions	1162	2nd place, silver medalist(s)
Charvin Dixon	Trap	181	=11
Donald Haldeman	Trap	190	1st place, gold medalist(s)
Bradley Simmons	Skeet	186	=44
John Satterwhite	Skeet	192	=14

== Swimming ==
Men

Athlete	Event	Heat		Semifinal		Final	
Athlete	Event	Time	Rank	Time	Rank	Time	Rank
Jack Babashoff	100 m freestyle	51.53	3 Q	51.46	3 Q	50.81	2nd place, silver medalist(s)
Joe Bottom	100 m freestyle	51.47	1 Q	51.92	6 Q	51.79	6
Jim Montgomery	100 m freestyle	52.13	8 Q	50.39 WR	1 Q	49.99 WR	1st place, gold medalist(s)
Bruce Furniss	200 m freestyle	1:50.93 OR	1 Q	—N/a		1:50.29 WR	1st place, gold medalist(s)
Jim Montgomery	200 m freestyle	1:51.77	5 Q	—N/a		1:50.58	3rd place, bronze medalist(s)
John Naber	200 m freestyle	1:52.78	8 Q	—N/a		1:50.50	2nd place, silver medalist(s)
Casey Converse	400 m freestyle	4:00.65	12	—N/a		Did not advance	
Brian Goodell	400 m freestyle	3:55.24 OR	1 Q	—N/a		3:51.93 WR	1st place, gold medalist(s)
Tim Shaw	400 m freestyle	3:56.40 OR	2	—N/a		3:52.54	2nd place, silver medalist(s)
Brian Goodell	1500 m freestyle	15:34.11	4 Q	—N/a		15:02.40 WR	1st place, gold medalist(s)
Bobby Hackett	1500 m freestyle	15:25.49	2 Q	—N/a		15:03.91	2nd place, silver medalist(s)
Paul Hartloff	1500 m freestyle	15:20.74 OR	1 Q	—N/a		15:32.08	7
Bob Jackson	100 m backstroke	58.02	4 Q	57.65	6 Q	57.69	6
John Naber	100 m backstroke	56.80	1 Q	56.19 WR	1 Q	55.49 WR	1st place, gold medalist(s)
Peter Rocca	100 m backstroke	58.12	5 Q	56.88	2 Q	56.34	2nd place, silver medalist(s)
Dan Harrigan	200 m backstroke	2:02.25 OR	2 Q	—N/a		2:01.35	3rd place, bronze medalist(s)
John Naber	200 m backstroke	2:02.01 OR	1 Q	—N/a		1:59.19 WR	1st place, gold medalist(s)
Peter Rocca	200 m backstroke	2:03.31	3 Q	—N/a		2:00.55	2nd place, silver medalist(s)
Larry Dowler	100 m breaststroke	1:05.32	8 Q	1:05.19	=9	Did not advance	
John Hencken	100 m breaststroke	1:03.88 OR	1 Q	1:03.62 WR	1 Q	1:03.11 WR	1st place, gold medalist(s)
Chris Woo	100 m breaststroke	1:05.39	10 Q	1:04.86	8 Q	1:05.13	8
Rick Colella	200 m breaststroke	2:21.08 OR	2 Q	—N/a		2:19.20	3rd place, bronze medalist(s)
John Hencken	200 m breaststroke	2:21.23	3 Q	—N/a		2:17.26	2nd place, silver medalist(s)
Charles Keating	200 m breaststroke	2:22.22	4 Q	—N/a		2:20.79	5
Joe Bottom	100 m butterfly	56.26	6 Q	55.26	3 Q	54.50	2nd place, silver medalist(s)
Gary Hall	100 m butterfly	55.35	2 Q	55.32	4 Q	54.65	3rd place, bronze medalist(s)
Matt Vogel	100 m butterfly	55.40	3 Q	54.80	2 Q	54.35	1st place, gold medalist(s)
Mike Bruner	200 m butterfly	2:01.35	3 Q	—N/a		1:59.23 WR	1st place, gold medalist(s)
Bill Forrester	200 m butterfly	2:01.95	7 Q	—N/a		1:59.96	3rd place, bronze medalist(s)
Steve Gregg	200 m butterfly	2:00.24 OR	1 Q	—N/a		1:59.54	2nd place, silver medalist(s)
Steve Furniss	400 m individual medley	4:27.76 OR	2 Q	—N/a		4:29.23	6
Tim McKee	400 m individual medley	4:29.14	4 Q	—N/a		4:24.62	2nd place, silver medalist(s)
Rod Strachan	400 m individual medley	4:27.15 OR	1 Q	—N/a		4:23.68 WR	1st place, gold medalist(s)
Mike Bruner; Bruce Furniss; Jim Montgomery; John Naber; Doug Northway^{[b]} Tim Shaw^{[b]}	4 × 200 m freestyle relay	7:30.33	1 Q	—N/a		7:23.22 WR	1st place, gold medalist(s)
Jack Babashoff^{[b]} Joe Bottom^{[b]} John Hencken; Jim Montgomery; John Naber; Peter Rocca^{[b]} Matt Vogel; Chris Woo^{[b]}	4 × 100 m medley relay	3:47.28	1 Q	—N/a		3:42.22 WR	1st place, gold medalist(s)

Women

Athlete	Event	Heat		Semifinal		Final	
Athlete	Event	Time	Rank	Time	Rank	Time	Rank
Shirley Babashoff	100 m freestyle	58.06	10 Q	56.95	3 Q	56.95	5
Kim Peyton	100 m freestyle	57.26	4 Q	56.89	2 Q	56.81	4
Jill Sterkel	100 m freestyle	57.41	6 Q	57.19	6 Q	57.06	7
Shirley Babashoff	200 m freestyle	2:01.64	2 Q	—N/a		2:01.22	2nd place, silver medalist(s)
Jennifer Hooker	200 m freestyle	2:03.72	7 Q	—N/a		2:04.20	6
Jill Sterkel	200 m freestyle	2:03.94	=9	—N/a		Did not advance	
Shirley Babashoff	400 m freestyle	4:16.07	2 Q	—N/a		4:10.46	2nd place, silver medalist(s)
Brenda Borgh	400 m freestyle	4:17.20	=5 Q	—N/a		4:17.43	6
Kathy Heddy	400 m freestyle	4:19.34	=7 Q	—N/a		4:15.50	5
Shirley Babashoff	800 m freestyle	8:47.74	3 Q	—N/a		8:37.59	2nd place, silver medalist(s)
Nicole Kramer	800 m freestyle	8:46.81 OR	2 Q	—N/a		8:47.33	5
Wendy Weinberg	800 m freestyle	8:49.78	5 Q	—N/a		8:42.60	3rd place, bronze medalist(s)
Linda Jezek	100 m backstroke	1:04.69	4 Q	1:06.01	11	Did not advance	
Renee Magee	100 m backstroke	1:06.44	19	Did not advance			
Tauna Vandeweghe	100 m backstroke	1:05.00	8 Q	1:06.29	12	Did not advance	
Melissa Belote	200 m backstroke	2:17.63	5 Q	—N/a		2:17.27	5
Maryanne Graham	200 m backstroke	2:19.07	10	—N/a		Did not advance	
Miriam Smith	200 m backstroke	2:22.05	13	—N/a		Did not advance	
Renee Laravie	100 m breaststroke	1:16.76	=20	Did not advance			
Marcia Morey	100 m breaststroke	1:17.30	25	Did not advance			
Lauri Siering	100 m breaststroke	1:15.41	13 Q	1:14.84	11	Did not advance	
Janis Hape	200 m breaststroke	2:45.57	25	—N/a		Did not advance	
Marcia Morey	200 m breaststroke	2:41.85	16	—N/a		Did not advance	
Lauri Siering	200 m breaststroke	2:41.66	15	—N/a		Did not advance	
Wendy Boglioli	100 m butterfly	1:01.84 OR	2 Q	1:01.75	4 Q	1:01.17	3rd place, bronze medalist(s)
Lelei Fonoimoana	100 m butterfly	1:02.75	9 Q	1:02.23	7 Q	1:01.95	7
Camille Wright	100 m butterfly	1:02.22	4 Q	1:01.89	5 Q	1:01.41	4
Karen Moe	200 m butterfly	2:14.53 OR	6 Q	—N/a		2:12.90	4
Donna Lee Wennerstrom	200 m butterfly	2:15.56	10	—N/a		Did not advance	
Camille Wright	200 m butterfly	2:14.77	9	—N/a		Did not advance	
Jeanne Haney	400 m individual medley	5:10.53	13	—N/a		Did not advance	
Donna Lee Wennerstrom	400 m individual medley	4:55.16	3 Q	—N/a		4:55.34	6
Shirley Babashoff; Wendy Boglioli; Kim Peyton; Jill Sterkel	4 × 100 m freestyle relay	3:50.27	3 Q	—N/a		3:44.82 WR	1st place, gold medalist(s)
Shirley Babashoff; Wendy Boglioli^{[b]} Lelei Fonoimoana^{[b]} Linda Jezek; Lauri Siering; Camille Wright	4 × 100 m medley relay	4:20.87	4 Q	—N/a		4:14.55	2nd place, silver medalist(s)

^{b} - Athlete swam in the heat but not the final.
Note: Times in the preliminary rounds ranked across all heats.

== Weightlifting ==
Athlete	Event	Snatch		Clean & jerk		Total	
Athlete	Event	Weight	Rank	Weight	Rank	Weight	Rank
Dan Cantore	–67.5 kg	120.0	=13	152.5	=10	272.5	11
Fred Lowe	–75 kg	135.0	=10	170.0	=9	305.0	11
Samuel Bigler	–82.5 kg	130.0	=12	177.5	=7	307.5	10
Phil Grippaldi	–90 kg	~~150.0~~	DQ	~~205.0~~	DQ	DQ	
Lee James	–90 kg	165.0	=2	197.5	3	362.5	2nd place, silver medalist(s)
Mark Cameron	–110 kg	~~162.5~~	DQ	~~212.5~~	DQ	DQ	
Gary Drinnon	–110 kg	152.5	14	200.0	=8	352.5	12
Sam Walker	+110 kg	142.5	9	182.5	9	325.0	9
Bruce Wilhelm	+110 kg	172.5	2	215.0	5	387.5	5

== Wrestling ==
Key:

- TO – Victory by fall.
- DQ - Loser disqualified for passivity.
- D1 - Loser disqualified for passivity, winner also judged to be passive.

Athlete	Event	Elimination stage								Final stage			
Athlete	Event	Opposition Result (Penalty points)	Opposition Result (Penalty points)	Opposition Result (Penalty points)	Opposition Result (Penalty points)	Opposition Result (Penalty points)	Opposition Result (Penalty points)	Opposition Result (Penalty points)	TPP	Opposition Result (Penalty points)	Opposition Result (Penalty points)	FPP	Rank
William Rosado	Freestyle 48 kg	Dmitriyev (URS); L TO (4.0)	Khishigbaatar (MGL); L 11–13 (3.0)	EL			—N/a		7.0	—N/a	Did not advance		
James Haines	Freestyle 52 kg	Măndilă (ROM); W 13–3 (0.5)	Abreu (CUB); L 12–13 (3.0)	Ivanov (URS); L 10–18 (3.5)	EL		—N/a		7.0	—N/a	Did not advance		
Joe Corso	Freestyle 57 kg	Ditta (PAK); W 20–8 (0.0)	Żedzicki (POL); L TO (4.0)	Arai (JPN); L TO (4.0)	EL		—N/a		8.0	—N/a	Did not advance		
Gene Davis	Freestyle 62 kg	Oidov (MGL); W 15–8 (1.0)	Toulotte (FRA); W TO (0.0)	Giray (FRG); W TO (0.0)	Timofeyev (URS); W 29–13 (0.0)	Farahvashi (IRN); L 12–18 (3.0)	Yang (KOR); L TO (4.0)	—N/a	8.0	—N/a	EL	5.0	3rd place, bronze medalist(s)
Lloyd Keaser	Freestyle 68 kg	Övermark (FIN); W 20–4 (0.0)	Navaei (IRN); W TO (0.0)	Sugawara (JPN); W DQ (0.0)	Weisenberger (FRG); W TO (0.0)	Ramos (CUB); W DQ (0.0)	Zhekov (BUL); W 9–5 (1.0)	—N/a	1.0	—N/a	Pinigin (URS); L 1–12 (3.5)	3.5	2nd place, silver medalist(s)
Stanley Dziedzic	Freestyle 74 kg	Düvchin (MGL); W DQ (0.0)	Herrick (PUR); W TO (0.0)	Karlsson (SWE); W 11–5 (1.0)	Bye	Ashuraliyev (URS); W 9–6 (1.0)	—N/a		2.0	Barzegar (IRN); L 8–11 (3.0)	Date (JPN); L 5–10 (3.0)	6.0	3rd place, bronze medalist(s)
John Peterson	Freestyle 82 kg	Shacklady (GBR); W TO (0.0)	Bouchoule (FRA); W DQ (0.0)	Seger (FRG); W 14–4 (0.5)	Kovács (HUN); W 10–3 (1.0)	Novozhilov (URS); W 20–4 (0.0)	Uzun (TUR); W 13–5 (0.5)	—N/a	2.0	—N/a		0.5	1st place, gold medalist(s)
Ben Peterson	Freestyle 90 kg	Morcov (ROM); W 7–4 (1.0)	Akhmedov (BUL); W 14–13 (1.0)	Yatsu (JPN); W 19–2 (0.0)	Morgan (CUB); W TO (0.0)	Kurczewski (POL); W 13–4 (0.5)	Stottmeister (GDR); W 13–8 (1.0)	—N/a	3.5	—N/a	Tediashvili (URS); L 5–11 (3.0)	4.0	2nd place, silver medalist(s)
Russell Hellickson	Freestyle 100 kg	Peache (GBR); W TO (0.0)	Shimizu (JPN); W DQ (0.0)	Soukhteh-Saraei (IRN); W TO (0.0)	Bayanmönkh (MGL); W 14–5 (0.5)	Yarygin (URS); L 13–19 (3.0)	—N/a		3.5	—N/a	Kostov (BUL); W 12–6 (1.0)	4.0	2nd place, silver medalist(s)
Jimmy Jackson	Freestyle +100 kg	Geris (CAN); W TO (0.0)	Andiyev (URS); L TO (4.0)	Balla (HUN); L 9–10 (3.0)	EL			—N/a	7.0	—N/a		Did not advance	
Michael Farina	Greco-Roman 48 kg	Bora (TUR); L 4–19 (4.0)	Seres (HUN); W TO (0.0)	Shumakov (URS); L DQ (4.0)	EL		—N/a		8.0	Did not advance			=8
Bruce Thompson	Greco-Roman 52 kg	Krauß (FRG); L 7–15 (3.5)	Holidis (GRE); W TO (0.0)	Rácz (HUN); L 6–8 (3.0)	EL		—N/a		6.5	—N/a	Did not advance		
Joseph Sade	Greco-Roman 57 kg	Krysta (TCH); L TO (4.0)	Jargalsaikhan (MGL); W 22–11 (0.5)	Grilo (POR); W 30–1 (0.0)	Suga (JPN); L TO (4.0)	EL	—N/a		8.5	Did not advance			
Gary Alexander	Greco-Roman 62 kg	Hjelt (FIN); L TO (4.0)	Réczi (HUN); L DQ (4.0)	EL					8.0	—N/a		Did not advance	
Patrick Marcy	Greco-Roman 68 kg	Bahamou (MAR); W TO3 (0.0)	Ranzi (ITA); L 4–10 (3.0)	Wehling (GDR); L DQ (4.0)	EL			—N/a	7.0	—N/a		Did not advance	
John Matthews	Greco-Roman 74 kg	Barban (CUB); L 10–13 (3.0)	Huhtala (FIN); L DQ (4.0)	EL			—N/a		7.0	Did not advance			
Daniel Chandler	Greco-Roman 82 kg	Hegedűs (HUN); W 9–8 (1.0)	Petković (YUG); L 5–14 (3.5)	Takanishi (JPN); L TO (4.0)	EL			—N/a	8.5	—N/a		Did not advance	
James Johnson	Greco-Roman 90 kg	Sarr (SEN); W TO (0.0)	Ivanov (BUL); L TO (4.0)	Nišavić (YUG); L DQ (4.0)	EL		—N/a		8.0	—N/a	Did not advance		=8
Brad Rheingans	Greco-Roman 100 kg	Hem (NOR); W 4–3 (1.0)	Moshtaghi (IRN); W TO (0.0)	Skrzydlewski (POL); W 9–7 (1.0)	Balboshin (URS); L TO (4.0)	—N/a			7.0	Did not advance			4
William Lee	Greco-Roman +100 kg	Tomov (BUL); W TO (0.0)	Matsunaga (JPN); W DQ (0.0)	Tomanek (POL); L DQ (4.0)	Codreanu (ROM); L D1 (4.0)	—N/a			8.0	Did not advance			5
