= Touzaint =

Touzaint is a surname. Notable people with the surname include:

- Jean-Yves Touzaint (born 1948), French equestrian
- Nicolas Touzaint (born 1980), French equestrian
- Thierry Touzaint (born 1953), French equestrian
