= Shooting at the 1976 Summer Olympics – Mixed 50 metre running target =

Sports shooting at the Olympics

Mixed 50 metre running target at the Games of the XXI Olympiad
- Venue: Montreal, Canada
- Date: 22–23 July 1976
- Competitors: 27 from 16 nations

Medalists
1st place, gold medalist(s)		Aleksandr Gazov	Soviet Union
2nd place, silver medalist(s)		Aleksandr Kedyarov	Soviet Union
3rd place, bronze medalist(s)		Jerzy Greszkiewicz	Poland

The mixed 50 metre running target was a shooting sports event held as part of the Shooting at the 1976 Summer Olympics programme. It was the second appearance of the event. The competition was held on 22 to 23 July 1976 at the shooting ranges in Montreal. 27 shooters from 16 nations competed.

== Results ==
Place	Shooter	Total
1	Aleksandr Gazov (URS)	579
2	Aleksandr Kedyarov (URS)	576
3	Jerzy Greszkiewicz (POL)	571
4	Thomas Pfeffer (GDR)	571
5	Wolfgang Hamberger (FRG)	567
6	Helmut Bellingrodt (COL)	567
7	Karl-Axel Karlsson (SWE)	565
8	Michael Theimer (USA)	564
9	Gyula Szabó (HUN)	562
10	Tibor Bodnár (HUN)	561
11T	Gunnar Svensson (SWE)	561
11T	Christoph-Michael Zeisner (FRG)	561
13	Hanspeter Bellingrodt (COL)	560
14	Martin Edmondson (USA)	558
15T	Zygmunt Bogdziewicz (POL)	553
15T	Li Man-gu (PRK)	553
17	Kenneth Skoglund (NOR)	552
18	Giovanni Mezzani (ITA)	550
19	Graeme McIntyre (NZL)	547
20	Pedro Ramírez (PUR)	545
21T	Lino Cerati (ITA)	543
21T	John Gough (GBR)	543
23	John Anthony (GBR)	537
24	Grant Taylor (NZL)	536
25	Daniel Nadeau (CAN)	526
26	Arturo Iglesias (GUA)	506
27	Víctor Giordani (GUA)	504
