= Swimming at the 1976 Summer Olympics – Women's 800 metre freestyle =

Women's 800 metre freestyle at the Games of the XXI Olympiad
- Venue: Montreal Olympic pool
- Date: 24 July 1976 (heats); 25 July 1976 (final)
- Competitors: 19 from 11 nations
- Winning time: 8:37.14 WR

Medalists
1st place, gold medalist(s)		Petra Thümer	East Germany
2nd place, silver medalist(s)		Shirley Babashoff	United States
3rd place, bronze medalist(s)		Wendy Weinberg	United States

The final of the women's 800 metre freestyle event for the 1976 Summer Olympics was held on July 25, 1976, in Montreal, after the preliminary heats on July 24, 1976.

== Results ==
=== Heats ===
Heat 1

Rank	Athlete	Country	Time	Notes
1	Nicole Kramer	United States	8:46.81	Q, OR
2	Shannon Smith	Canada	8:52.66	Q
3	Lisa Geary	Canada	8:56.49	
4	Allison Calder	New Zealand	8:57.24	
5	Carine Verbauwen	Belgium	8:57.31	
6	Laura Bortolotti	Italy	9:00.16	

Heat 2

Rank	Athlete	Country	Time	Notes
1	Petra Thümer	East Germany	8:46.58	Q, OR
2	Regina Jäger	East Germany	8:49.19	Q
3	Wendy Weinberg	United States	8:49.78	Q
4	Wendy Quirk	Canada	8:53.93	
5	Eleonora Pandini	Italy	9:12.47	
6	Fernanda Pérez	Colombia	9:36.10	
-	Maria Guimarães	Brazil	-	DQ

Heat 3

Rank	Athlete	Country	Time	Notes
1	Shirley Babashoff	United States	8:47.74	Q
2	Jenny Turrall	Australia	8:51.41	Q
3	Rosemary Milgate	Australia	8:53.65	Q
4	Annelies Maas	Netherlands	8:57.38	
5	Tracey Wickham	Australia	9:01.93	
6	Antonia Real	Spain	9:07.24	
7	Diana Hatler	Puerto Rico	9:43.51	

=== Final ===
Rank	Athlete	Country	Time	Notes
1	Petra Thümer	East Germany	8:37.14	WR
2	Shirley Babashoff	United States	8:37.59	
3	Wendy Weinberg	United States	8:42.60	
4	Rosemary Milgate	Australia	8:47.21	
5	Nicole Kramer	United States	8:47.33	
6	Shannon Smith	Canada	8:48.15	
7	Regina Jäger	East Germany	8:50.40	
8	Jenny Turrall	Australia	8:52.88	
