= Bost =

Bost may refer to:

== Places ==
- Alternative name for Lashkargah, Afghanistan
  - Boost Defenders, a cricket team from the region
  - Bost Airport, near Lashkargah
- Bost, Allier, a commune in central France

== People ==
- Bost (Μποστ) (1918–1995), pen name of Chrysanthos Mentis Bostantzoglou, Greek playwright, painter, and cartoonist
- Carlton Bost (born 1975), American musician
- Dee Bost (born 1989), American professional basketball player
- Eric M. Bost, United States Ambassador to South Africa, 2006–2009
- Jacques-Laurent Bost (1916–1990), French journalist
- John Bost (1817–1881), Swiss Calvinist pastor and musician
- Joseph Bost (born 1956), American judoka
- Josiane Bost (born 1956), former French racing cyclist
- Matthieu Bost, one half of the French dancehall reggae production team Bost & Bim
- Mike Bost (born 1960), American politician from Illinois
- Paul Bost (1905–1974), American racecar driver

== Other uses ==
- Bankside Open Spaces Trust (BOST), a charity operating in London
- Bost Motorsports, a former NASCAR Busch Series team owned by Danny Bost
- Bost's Bread, a brand of baked bread formerly distributed in the Western Carolinas, Virginia and Tennessee
- Bost Building, also known as Columbia Hotel, a historic landmark in Homestead, Pennsylvania
- Bost University, a private, non-sectarian university in Lashkarga, Helmand Province, Afghanistan

== See also ==
- Burst (village), Belgium
