= Lino Cerati =

Italian sports shooter (1938–2025)

Personal information
- Born: 13 July 1938 Mogadishu, Italian Somaliland
- Died: 8 November 2025 (aged 87) Cremona, Italy

Sport
- Sport: Sports shooting

Lino Cerati (13 July 1938 – 8 November 2025) was an Italian sports shooter. He competed in the men's 50 metre running target event at the 1976 Summer Olympics. Cerati died in Cremona on 8 November 2025, at the age of 87.
