= Víctor Giordani =

Guatemalan sports shooter

Personal information
- Nationality: Guatemalan
- Born: 22 January 1951 (age 74)

Sport
- Sport: Sports shooting

Víctor Giordani (born 22 January 1951) is a Guatemalan sports shooter. He competed in the men's 50 metre running target event at the 1976 Summer Olympics.
