= Gunnar Svensson (sport shooter) =

Swedish sports shooter

Personal information
- Full name: Sven Gunnar Svensson
- Nationality: Swedish
- Born: 30 March 1953 (age 72) Karlstad, Sweden

Sport
- Sport: Sports shooting

Sven Gunnar Svensson (born 30 March 1953), known as Gunnar Svensson, is a retired Swedish sports shooter.

At the 1974 ISSF World Shooting Championships in Thun, Switzerland, he helped Sweden to win a team silver medal in the 50 metre running target event. Later, in Montreal, Canada, he competed in the men's 50 metre running target event at the 1976 Summer Olympics, finishing in a tie for 11th place.
