= Li Man-gu =

North Korean sports shooter

Personal information
- Nationality: North Korean
- Born: 10 November 1950 (age 74)

Sport
- Sport: Sports shooting

Li Man-gu (born 10 November 1950) is a North Korean sports shooter. He competed in the men's 50 metre running target event at the 1976 Summer Olympics.
