= Lisa Geary =

Canadian swimmer

Personal information
- Born: 7 November 1961 (age 64) Grande Prairie, Alberta, Canada

Sport
- Sport: Swimming

Lisa Geary (born 7 November 1961) is a Canadian former swimmer. She competed in the women's 800 metre freestyle at the 1976 Summer Olympics.
