= Fernando Lupiz =

Argentine fencer (born 1953)

Personal information
- Born: 12 April 1953 (age 73) Buenos Aires, Argentina

Sport
- Sport: Fencing

Fernando Lúpiz (born 12 April 1953) is an Argentine fencer and actor. He competed at the 1972 and 1976 Summer Olympics. He later became known for playing Zorro on stage.

== Early life ==
Lúpiz was born in Buenos Aires, Argentina on 12 April 1953. He is the son of fencer Enrique Lúpiz and the great nephew of Argentine actor Fernando Ochoa. Lúpiz took interest in fencing from an early age.

== Career ==
He became the Junior and Senior National champion in Argentina. In 1975, he placed fourth in the Pan American Games in Mexico. During his fencing career, he won two Silver Olimpia Awards in fencing; one in 1977 and one in 1979.

== Acting career ==
In 1974, Lúpiz met American actor Guy Williams, who had retired from Hollywood and moved to Argentina. Together, the two men performed at the Real Madrid Circus where they put on a show entitled The Son of Zorro. Under Williams' influences, Lúpiz became interested in acting. He studied theater with Lito Cruz and Augusto Fernández and became good friends with director Alejandro Doria.

His first television roles were for the channel ATC in 1979. He went on to play leads in various telenovelas like Tramposa, El groncho y la dama and Pasiones. Beginning in 1990, Lúpiz starred in two seasons of the comedy series Detective de señoras. More recently, he has appeared in the Channel 13 telenovela Collar de esmeraldas (2006) and the fantasy film La luz del bosque (2008).

In 2000, Lúpiz began playing Zorro on stage in Argentina in the El Zorro play. He received four Sea Star Awards for his role as the masked vigilante in five additional Zorro plays.

== Filmography ==
=== Television ===
- 1979: Chantecler, ATC.
- 1980: Anastasia en la sombra, ATC.
- 1982: La búsqueda, Canal 13.
- 1982: Cuando vuelvas a mí, Canal 13.
- 1984: Tramposa, Canal 13.
- 1984: Lucía Bonelli
- 1987: Mesa de noticias, ATC.
- 1987: El lobo, Canal 9.
- 1987: La cuñada.
- 1988: Pasiones.
- 1988–1989: Matrimonios y algo más, Canal 13.
- 1991: Detective de señoras, Canal 13.
- 1992: Mi socio imposible.
- 1993: Dos al toque, Telefé.
- 1994: Brigada Cola, Telefé.
- 1995: Aprender a volar, Canal 13.
- 1995: Por siempre mujercitas, Canal 9.
- 1996: Poliladron, Canal 13.
- 1997: Mamá x 2, Canal 9.
- 1997: Gane volando, ATC.
- 1998: Telesuerte, en Canal 9.
- 1999: ¡Trillizos, dijo la partera!
- 1994–2000: Susana Giménez (8 sketches) Telefé.
- 2000: Primicias (10 episodes) Canal 13.
- 2003: Soy gitano, Canal 13.
- 2003: Los simuladores, as himself
- 2003: Ensayo
- 2003–2004: El club del Zorro, Canal 13 (2003/2004).
- 2006: Collar de esmeraldas
- 2006: Doble filo

=== Film ===
- 1982: Los pasajeros del jardín, directed by Alejandro Doria.
- 1982: El impenetrable, directed by Carlos Orgambide.
- 1988: El profesor punk, directed by Enrique Carreras.
- 2006: La luz del bosque
- 2018 Don't Cry for Me England

=== Theater ===
- 1984: En boca cerrada, directed by Agustín Alezzo
- 1988: Qué familia de locos, directed by Enrique Carreras
- 1990-1991: Matrimonios y algo más..., directed by Hugo Moser
- 1991: Mentirosos, with Claudio García Satur
- 1994: Brigada Cola, with Emilio Disi
- 1999: Las alegres mujeres de Shakespeare, directed by Claudio Hochman
- 2000–2001: El Zorro, directed by Claudio Hochman
- 2002: Vuelve el Zorro, directed by Claudio Hochman
- 2003: El Zorro y las monedas de oro, directed by Carlos Moreno.
- 2004: El Zorro III, la espada de la libertad, directed by Carlos Moreno.
- 2005–2006: La guarida del Zorro, el diamante de la corona, directed by Carlos Moreno
- 2005–2006: 5 gays.com, directed by Rafael Pence
- 2007: Mi mujer se llama Mauricio
- 2008: Mister Nueva York, directed by Carlos Evaristo
- 2009: El Zorro, el tesoro de la montaña azul
- 2015 The Canterville Ghost (producer)
- 2015: La jaula de las locas
