= Daniel Nadeau =

Canadian sports shooter (born 1954)

Personal information
- Born: 28 February 1954 (age 72) Quebec City, Quebec
- Height: 178 cm (5 ft 10 in)
- Weight: 70 kg (154 lb)

Sport
- Sport: Sports shooting

Daniel Nadeau (born 28 February 1954) is a Canadian former sports shooter. He competed at the 1976 Summer Olympics.
