= Martin Edmondson =

American sports shooter

Personal information
- Nationality: American
- Born: March 20, 1944 (age 82) San Antonio, Texas, United States

Sport
- Sport: Sports shooting

Martin Edmondson (born March 20, 1944) is an American sports shooter. He competed in the men's 50 metre running target event at the 1976 Summer Olympics.
