= Norman van de Vater =

Irish equestrian

Personal information
- Nationality: Irish
- Born: 27 August 1930 (age 95) Cwmbach, Wales

Sport
- Sport: Equestrian
Medal record
Equestrian
Representing Ireland
European Championships
Bronze medal – third place	1977 Burghley	Team eventing

Norman van de Vater (born 27 August 1930) is an Irish equestrian. He competed in two events at the 1976 Summer Olympics.
