= Eric Horgan =

Irish equestrian

Personal information
- Nationality: Irish
- Born: 27 August 1947 (age 78)

Sport
- Sport: Equestrian
Medal record
Equestrian
Representing Ireland
European Championships
Bronze medal – third place	1977 Burghley	Team eventing
Bronze medal – third place	1989 Burghley	Team eventing

Eric Horgan (born 27 August 1947) is an Irish equestrian. He competed in two events at the 1976 Summer Olympics.
