= Claudia Bellotto =

Argentine swimmer

Personal information
- Born: 9 July 1960 (age 66)

Sport
- Sport: Swimming

Claudia Bellotto (born 9 July 1960) is an Argentine former swimmer. She competed in four events at the 1976 Summer Olympics.
