= Juliet Graham =

Canadian equestrian

Personal information
- Nationality: Canadian
- Born: 17 June 1954 (age 72) Leamington Spa, England

Sport
- Sport: Equestrian

Juliet Graham (born 17 June 1954) is a Canadian equestrian. She competed in two events at the 1976 Summer Olympics.
