= Silvia de Luna =

Guatemalan equestrian (born 1957)

Personal information
- Nationality: Guatemalan
- Born: 10 October 1957 (age 68)

Sport
- Sport: Equestrian
Medal record
Equestrian
Representing Guatemala
Central American and Caribbean Games
Bronze medal – third place	2006 Cartagena	Team dressage
Bronze medal – third place	2014 Veracruz	Team dressage

Silvia de Luna (born 10 October 1957) is a Guatemalan former equestrian. She competed in the individual eventing at the 1976 Summer Olympics.
