= Kenkichi Ishiguro =

Japanese equestrian

Personal information
- Nationality: Japanese
- Born: 10 August 1946 (age 78)

Sport
- Sport: Equestrian

Kenkichi Ishiguro (born 10 August 1946) is a Japanese equestrian. He competed in two events at the 1976 Summer Olympics.
