= Regina Jäger =

German swimmer

Personal information
- Born: 1 November 1960 (age 65) Dessau-Roßlau, Germany

Sport
- Sport: Swimming

Regina Jäger (born 1 November 1960) is a German former swimmer. She competed in two events at the 1976 Summer Olympics.
