= Raúl Labbate =

Argentine cyclist

Personal information
- Born: 8 March 1952 (age 74) Pergamino, Argentina

Cycling career
- Sport: Cycling

Raúl Labbate (born 8 March 1952) is an Argentine former cyclist. He competed in the individual road race and team time trial events at the 1976 Summer Olympics.
