= Patricia Spohn =

Argentine swimmer

Personal information
- Born: 18 March 1961 (age 65)

Sport
- Sport: Swimming

Patricia Spohn (born 18 March 1961) is an Argentine former swimmer. She competed in three events at the 1976 Summer Olympics.
