= Gerry Sinnott =

Irish equestrian

Personal information
- Nationality: Irish
- Born: 31 July 1951 (age 73)

Sport
- Sport: Equestrian

Gerry Sinnott (born 31 July 1951) is an Irish equestrian. He competed in two events at the 1976 Summer Olympics.
