= Jean Valat =

French equestrian

Personal information
- Nationality: French
- Born: 26 October 1951 (age 75)

Sport
- Sport: Equestrian

Jean Valat (French: [ʒɑ̃ vala]; born 26 October 1951) is a French equestrian. He competed in two events at the 1976 Summer Olympics.
