= Pyotr Gornushko =

Russian equestrian

Personal information
- Nationality: Russian
- Born: 12 July 1953 (age 72) Gigant, Russia

Sport
- Sport: Equestrian
Medal record
Equestrian
Representing the Soviet Union
European Championships
Gold medal – first place	1975 Luhmühlen	Team eventing
Bronze medal – third place	1975 Luhmühlen	Individual eventing

Pyotr Gornushko (born 12 July 1953) is a Russian equestrian. He competed in two events at the 1976 Summer Olympics.
