= Rita de Luna =

Guatemalan equestrian (1929–1996)

Personal information
- Nationality: Guatemalan
- Born: 1 September 1929; Gdańsk, Poland
- Died: 15 March 1996 (aged 66); Guatemala City, Guatemala

Sport
- Sport: Equestrian

Rita del Pilar Mombiela de Luna de la Vega (1 September 1929 – 15 March 1996) was a Guatemalan equestrian. She competed in the individual eventing at the 1976 Summer Olympics. De Luna died in Guatemala City on 15 March 1996, at the age of 66.
