= Viktor Kalinin =

Russian equestrian

Personal information
- Nationality: Russian
- Born: 19 March 1940 (age 86) Tambov, Russia

Sport
- Sport: Equestrian
Medal record
Equestrian
Representing the Soviet Union
European Championships
Gold medal – first place	1975 Luhmühlen	Team eventing

Viktor Kalinin (born 19 March 1940) is a Russian equestrian. He competed in two events at the 1976 Summer Olympics.
