= Michael Theimer =

American sports shooter

Personal information
- Nationality: American
- Born: {}

Sport
- Sport: Sports shooting

Michael Theimer (born 1950) is an American sports shooter. He competed in the men's 50 metre running target event at the 1976 Summer Olympics.
