= Valery Dvoryaninov =

Soviet equestrian

Personal information
- Nationality: Soviet
- Born: 6 November 1947 Tashkent, Uzbekistan
- Died: 20 August 2026 (aged 78)

Sport
- Sport: Equestrian

Valery Dvoryaninov (6 November 1947 – 20 August 2026) was a Soviet equestrian. He competed in two events at the 1976 Summer Olympics. He won two gold medals at the 1979 Summer Spartakiad of the Peoples of the USSR and was also a USSR national champion.
