= Carlos Braconi =

Argentine wrestler (born 1947)

Personal information
- Nationality: Argentine
- Born: 23 September 1947 (age 77)

Sport
- Sport: Wrestling

Carlos Braconi (born 23 September 1947) is an Argentine wrestler. He competed in two events at the 1976 Summer Olympics.
