= Kenji Eto =

Japanese equestrian

Personal information
- Nationality: Japanese
- Born: 22 January 1948 (age 77)

Sport
- Sport: Equestrian

Kenji Eto (born 22 January 1948) is a Japanese equestrian. He competed in two events at the 1976 Summer Olympics.
