= Nicole Kramer =

American swimmer (born 1962)

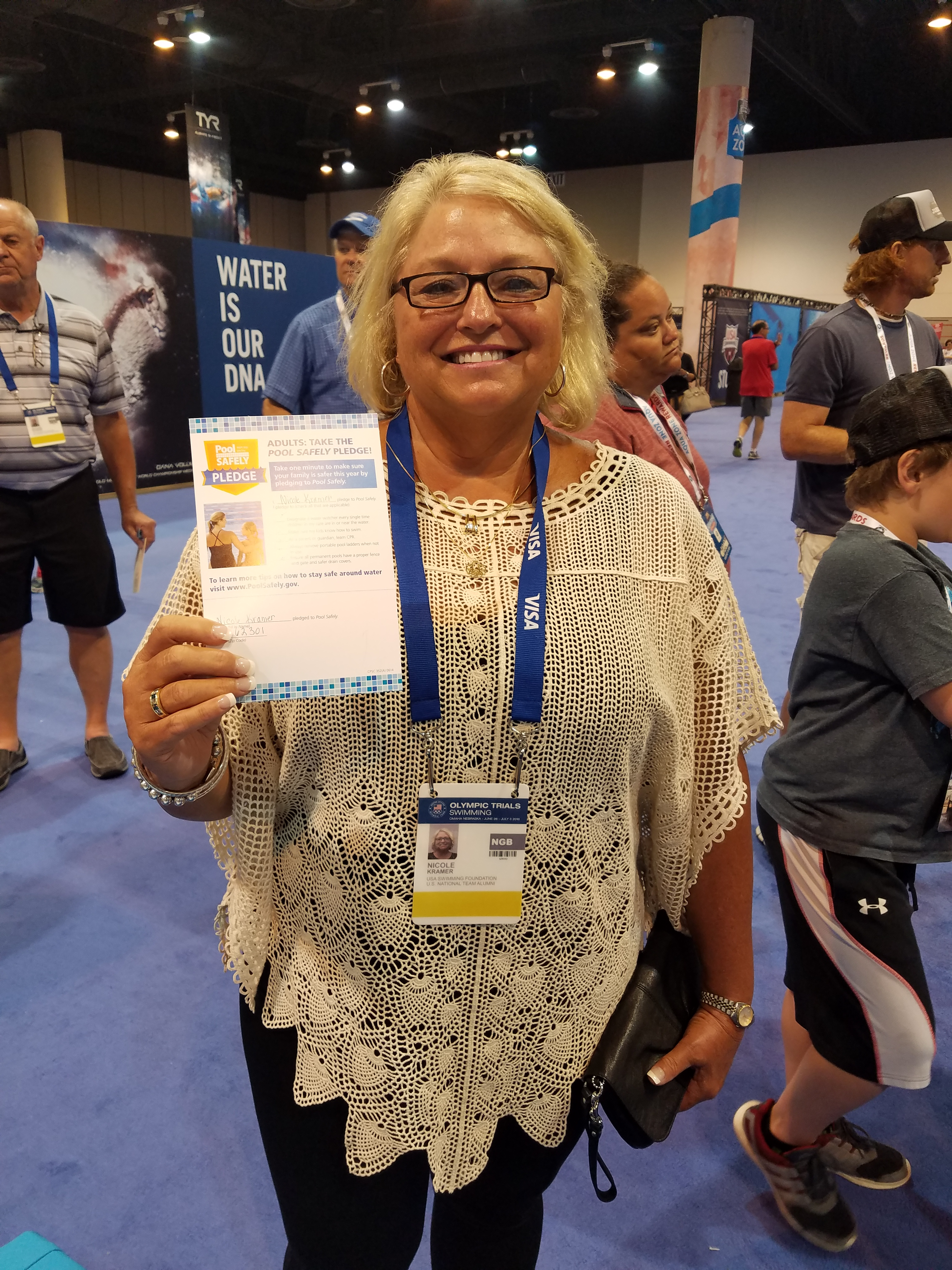

Personal information
- Full name: Nicole Kramer
- National team: United States
- Born: February 8, 1962 (age 64) Quincy, Illinois
- Occupations: Swim coach, instructor Nicole's Swim School
- Height: 5 ft 0 in (1.52 m)
- Weight: 110 lb (50 kg)

Sport
- Sport: Swimming
- Strokes: Freestyle
- Club: Sheridan Swim Club (Quincey, MA); Mission Viejo Nadadores
- Coach: Ken LeMaster (Sheridan Swim Club); Mark Schubert (Nadadores); Jack Nelson (76 Olympics)

Nicole Kramer (born February 8, 1962) is an American former competition swimmer who swam for the Mission Viejo Nadadores, and represented the United States as a 14-year-old at the 1976 Summer Olympics in Montreal, Quebec. At the Montreal Olympics, she broke the standing Olympic record for the 800 meter event with a time of 8:46.81 in a preliminary heat, but in a highly competitive field finished fifth in the event final with a time of 8:47.33.

== Early life ==
Kramer was born August 2, 1962 in Quincy, Illinois. Prior to moving to Mission Viejo, she swam for Quincy's Sheridan Swim Club beginning at the age of 8 in 1970. From 1974-1975 she was trained at Sheridan Swim Club under Coach Ken LeMaster. LeMaster swam for Oklahoma State, where he was an Assistant Coach for two years.

Nadores Coach Mark Schubert

In 1975, Kramer relocated to attend Mission Viejo High School, and swim with the strong program of the Mission Viejo Nadadores in Orange County where in peak training she swam 10-13 miles a day. With the demands of her swim training and the need to travel to meets, Nicole had a tutor, and for convenience roomed with the family of one of the Mission Viejo swimmers. With the Mission Viejo Nadadores, she trained under Hall of Fame Head Coach Mark Schubert, a former swimmer for the University of Kentucky. At Mission Viejo, she trained with elite American Olympians Shirley Babashoff, Maryanne Graham, and Marcia Morey. The Mission Viejo team, as part of the Mission Viejo Company under Vice President Jim Toepfer, had access to outstanding facilities by 1976 including four recreation centers that housed a 50 meter Olympic pool in Marguerite Center, and three 25-yard junior Olympic pools. They also had access to Mission Viejo High School's 25-yard pool.

== 1976 Olympic trials ==
In a qualifying heat at the Olympic trials, Kramer placed second in the 800 freestyle event with a time of 8:42.9, breaking the standing women's record, as did Shirley Babashoff, who placed first with an 8:39.6. At the 1976 trials in Long Beach, California, she placed sixth in the finals of the 400-meter swim with a time of 4:19.23. In preparation for the 1976 Olympics, Kramer trained with the U.S. team at West Point Military Academy in Virginia under Head U.S. Women's swim team under Head Olympic Coach Jack Nelson.

== 1976 Montreal Olympics ==
At the 1976 Montreal Olympics Kramer finished fifth in the event final of the women's 800-meter freestyle with a time of 8:47.33. She is the youngest swimmer (14 years, 167 days) to compete for the United States in a Summer Olympics since 1976. In her first preliminary round, in a very fast field, Kramer broke the standing Olympic record in the women's 800-meter freestyle with a time of 8:46.81, though she finished second to East German Petra Thumer who swam an 8:46.58, also qualifying for the finals and breaking the standard Olympic record . With the highly competitive East German team, which has since been found to have been using steroids, and the more experienced American swimmers competing in the finals, her final time in the event granted her only a fifth place finish.

After her swimming career, she returned to Quincy, Illinois and taught and coached swimming at Nicole's Swim School.
