= Aleksandr Kedyarov =

Soviet sport shooter

Olympic medal record

Shooting

Representing Soviet Union
Silver medal – second place	1976 Montreal	50 m running target

Aleksandr Petrovich Kedyarov (Russian: Александр Петрович Кедяров, born December 24, 1947) is a Soviet sport shooter and won a silver medal in the 50 metre running target event at the 1976 Summer Olympics in Montreal.
