= Roberto Tagle =

Argentine equestrian

Personal information
- Born: 30 September 1945 (age 79); Córdoba, Argentina

Sport
- Sport: Equestrian

Roberto Tagle (born 30 September 1945) is an Argentine equestrian. He competed at the 1968 Summer Olympics, the 1972 Summer Olympics and the 1976 Summer Olympics.
