= Thierry Touzaint =

French equestrian

Personal information
- Nationality: French
- Born: 26 December 1953 (age 72)

Sport
- Sport: Equestrian
Medal record
Equestrian
Representing France
World Championships
Silver medal – second place	1986 Gawler	Team eventing
European Championships
Bronze medal – third place	1979 Luhmühlen	Team eventing

Thierry Touzaint (born 26 December 1953) is a French equestrian. He competed in two events at the 1976 Summer Olympics.
