= Mervyn Bennett (equestrian) =

Australian equestrian (born 1944)

Personal information
- Nationality: Australian
- Born: 7 September 1944 (age 81) Nowra, New South Wales, Australia
Medal record
Equestrian
Representing Australia
Olympic Games
Bronze medal – third place	1976 Montreal	Team eventing

Mervyn Bennett (born 7 September 1944) is an Australian equestrian. He won a bronze medal in team eventing at the 1976 Summer Olympics in Montreal, Quebec, Canada.
