= Rodolfo Grazzini =

Argentine equestrian

Personal information
- Nationality: Argentine
- Born: 3 June 1945 (age 79)

Sport
- Sport: Equestrian

Rodolfo Grazzini (born 3 June 1945) is an Argentine equestrian. He competed in two events at the 1976 Summer Olympics.
