= Olympic Equestrian Centre, Bromont =

Sports venue in Bromont, Quebec

Coordinates: 45°17′19″N 72°40′22″W

The Olympic Equestrian Centre, Bromont is a horse sports venue located in Bromont, Quebec. Built in 1975, it hosted the equestrian (except for team jumping which was held at Olympic Stadium in Montreal) and the riding portion of the modern pentathlon competitions for the 1976 Summer Olympics.

Since the 1976 Games, the venue has hosted numerous equestrian events.
