= Hugh Thomas (equestrian) =

British equestrian

Medal record

Equestrian

Representing Great Britain

World Championships
Bronze medal – third place	1974 Burghley	Individual eventing

Hugh Thomas is a British former Olympic equestrian rider, technical delegate, course designer and event organiser.

== Career ==
Hugh's career began in the Hampshire Hunt Pony Club. As a rider, he won bronze in the Eventing World Championships in 1974, came second place at Badminton Horse Trials in 1976 and competed in the 1976 Summer Olympics.

Hugh then was a BBC commentator on equestrian sports and worked for British Equestrian Promotions. He designed the course at the 1988 Summer Olympics, was the FEI technical delegate at the 1996 Summer Olympics and was chairman of the British Equestrian Federation for three years.

In 1988, Hugh became Course Designer and Director of Badminton Horse Trials, the largest paid-entry sports event in the United Kingdom and the second largest in the world.

In the run up to the London Olympics, in June 2012, in protest at the decision by LOCOG to ban spectators from attending the horse inspections in violation of FEI rules, Thomas resigned his position as a member of the ad hoc committee, branding it as "disgraceful". He had previously fought to ensure the inspection was open in two previous games with this announcement going viral.

In 2019, he was awarded the BEWA Lifetime Achievement Award.

== Personal life ==
Hugh Thomas is the godfather of Zara Tindall.
