= Helmut Rethemeier =

German equestrian

Medal record

Equestrian

Representing West Germany

Olympic Games
Silver medal – second place	1976 Montreal	Team eventing

World Championships
Silver medal – second place	1978 Lexington	Team eventing
Silver medal – second place	1982 Luhmühlen	Team eventing
Silver medal – second place	1982 Luhmühlen	Individual eventing
Bronze medal – third place	1978 Lexington	Individual eventing

European Championships
Silver medal – second place	1981 Horsens	Individual eventing

Helmut Rethemeier (born 8 June 1939) is a German equestrian and Olympic medalist. He competed in eventing at the 1976 Summer Olympics in Montreal, and won a silver medal with the German team.
