= Michael Plumb =

American equestrian

Personal information
- Full name: John Michael Plumb
- Born: March 28, 1940 (age 86) Islip, New York, U.S.
Medal record
Equestrian
Representing the United States
Olympic Games
Gold medal – first place	1976 Montreal	Team eventing
Gold medal – first place	1984 Los Angeles	Team eventing
Silver medal – second place	1964 Tokyo	Team eventing
Silver medal – second place	1968 Mexico City	Team eventing
Silver medal – second place	1972 Munich	Team eventing
Silver medal – second place	1976 Montreal	Individual eventing
World Championships
Silver medal – second place	1974 Burghley	Team eventing
Silver medal – second place	1974 Burghley	Individual eventing
Bronze medal – third place	1978 Lexington	Team eventing
Bronze medal – third place	1982 Luhmühlen	Team eventing
Pan American Games
Gold medal – first place	1963 Sao Paulo	Team eventing
Gold medal – first place	1967 Winnipeg	Individual eventing
Gold medal – first place	1967 Winnipeg	Team eventing
Silver medal – second place	1959 Chicago	Individual eventing
Silver medal – second place	1959 Chicago	Team eventing

John Michael Plumb (born March 28, 1940) is an American equestrian and Olympic champion who competes in the sport of three-day eventing. He holds the title of the US Olympic competitor who has competed in the greatest number of Olympics, winning two team gold medals, three team silvers and one individual silver.

He has also competed at the World Equestrian Games and Pan-American Games, winning medals at both, as well as competing in the Rolex Kentucky Three Day and steeplechase events. He has been named to the Hall of Fame of the United States Eventing Association (USEA), as well as winning annual USEA awards, and is the only equestrian rider to have been inducted to the United States Olympic Hall of Fame. He was previously married to fellow Olympian Donnan Plumb, and the couple has three sons.

== Personal life ==
Plumb was born in Islip, New York, and grew up in Syosset, New York. His father, Charles, was a steeplechase rider and huntsman, and his mother, Meem, was also an equestrian. Plumb began riding at the Meadow Brooks Hounds Pony Club, where he participated in Pony Club. In 1972, he graduated from the University of Delaware. He married Donnan Sharp Plumb, a dressage rider who competed in the 1968 Summer Olympics; they later divorced. The couple had three sons – Hugh, Matt and Charlie; Charlie became a successful event rider. Matt and Hugh have had a successful auto racing career in sports car racing.

== Career ==
=== Competition ===
Plumb began his international competitive three-day event career at the 1959 Pan American Games in Chicago, Illinois. Throughout his career he competed for the United States in several other Pan-American Games, and won three gold medals, including an individual gold in 1963 and team golds in 1963 and 1967. Plumb also competed at several Eventing World Championships, accruing four medals. In 1974 he assisted the US team to a silver, while also taking silver in the individual competition, and helped the US team to bronze medals in both 1978 and 1982.

As of 2008, Plumb was the US Olympic athlete with the greatest number of appearances in any sport at the Games. He was named to the US team in every Olympic games between 1960 (his first) and 1984, as well as appearing for the last time at the 1992 Summer Olympics, and competed at all of the Games except for 1980, when the US did not compete. During his seven Olympic appearances, he gathered multiple medals. At the 1960 Summer Olympics, Plumb took an individual 15th, while the US team did not finish the competition. At the 1964 Games, he repeated his individual performance, while the US team improved to take the silver medal. At these Games, he became the first rider ever to win a medal on a horse that he had never previously ridden in competition. Plumb had planned to ride his main event horse, Markham, but on the flight to the Games in Tokyo, the horse panicked, possibly due to a bad experience previously suffered in a horse trailer. In order to keep him from destroying his stall and potentially the aircraft, the horse was euthanized. Plumb instead rode Bold Minstrel, a horse loaned to him by another top-level eventer.

In 1968, at Ciudad de Mexico, Plumb took an individual 14th, while the US team again finished with a silver. In 1970, when Jack le Goff became coach of the United States eventing team, Plumb was one of only three active US riders with international experience in the sport. Between then and 1984, when le Goff retired, the US eventing team, with Plumb as part, amassed three team and three individual medals, as well as additional triumphs at the World Equestrian Games and Pan-American Games. At the 1972 Summer Olympics, the US team took the silver medal for the third Games in a row, while Plumb finished 20th individually. At the 1976 Games, Plumb achieved his only individual medal, taking silver, while the US team took gold. Plumb qualified for the 1980 U.S. Olympic team but did not compete due to the U.S. Olympic Committee's boycott of the 1980 Summer Olympics in Moscow, Russia. He was one of 461 athletes to receive a Congressional Gold Medal instead. Despite the US boycott, Plumb competed at the alternate games in Fontainebleau, France. The team repeated this performance at the 1984 Olympics, while Plumb took an individual 10th place. In 1988, he was slated to make the US Equestrian Team, but was not able to compete due to a fall that resulted in a broken collarbone. In 1992, Plumb competed in his last Olympics, placing 48th individually while the team took 10th.

Plumb has ridden in steeplechase competitions, and in 1976 placed second at the Maryland Hunt Cup, an event which his father had won in 1929. He has also competed multiple times at the Rolex Kentucky Three Day.

=== Influence ===
In 2002, Plumb was named as one of the 50 most influential horsemen of the 20th century by the equine magazine Chronicle of the Horse. In 2003, Plumb was inducted to the United States Eventing Association Hall of Fame, along with one of his horses, Plain Sailing. Good Mixture, another of Plumb's horses, was inducted in 2009. In 2008, Plumb became the first (and to date, only) equestrian to be inducted into the United States Olympic Hall of Fame. The United States Eventing Association awarded Plumb their Leading Rider of the Year Award on ten occasions. Plumb is known for his training abilities with both horses and other riders, and as of 2018 he continued to ride and train at his stables in Southern Pines, North Carolina.

Plumb is reticent about discussing his accomplishments, but colleagues have referred to him as the "ultimate team member" who could be counted on to be at the top of his game and a consistent performer. As team captain at the 1992 Barcelona Olympics, he was noted for helping his teammates understand everything that was going on around them. His athleticism and personal courage have been praised by those who know him, such as Michael Page, chef d’equipe for the 1986 US World Championship team, who recounted how Plumb medaled at the competition despite three broken ribs. Plumb admits to being completely focused on riding and "not a social person", with former coach Jack le Goff saying that "horses are his only reason for being on earth".

== Sources ==
- Bryant, Jennifer O. (2000). Olympic Equestrian:The Sports and the Stories from Stockholm to Sydney. The Blood-Horse, Inc. ISBN 1-58150-044-0.
