= Carlos Rawson =

Argentine equestrian

Personal information
- Nationality: Argentine
- Born: 18 June 1946 (age 78)

Sport
- Sport: Equestrian

Carlos Rawson (born 18 June 1946) is an Argentine equestrian. He competed in two events at the 1976 Summer Olympics.
