= Joseph Bost =

American judoka

Personal information
- Born: 4 August 1956 (age 68)
- Occupation: Judoka

Sport
- Sport: Judo

Profile at external databases
- JudoInside.com: 89533

Joseph Bost (born August 4, 1956) is a former member of the 1976 US Judo Olympic Team. At the Olympics he lost in the first round.
