= Karl Schultz =

German equestrian (born 1937)

Medal record

Equestrian

Representing West Germany

Olympic Games
Silver medal – second place	1976 Montreal	Team eventing
Bronze medal – third place	1972 Munich	Team eventing
Bronze medal – third place	1976 Montreal	Individual venting

European Championships
Silver medal – second place	1977 Burghley	Individual eventing
Silver medal – second place	1977 Burghley	Team eventing

Karl Schultz (born 6 November 1937) is a German equestrian and Olympic medalist. He was born in Schleswig-Holstein. He competed in eventing at the 1972 Summer Olympics in Munich and at the 1976 Summer Olympics in Montreal.
