= Ángel Boyenechea =

Argentine equestrian

Personal information
- Nationality: Argentine
- Born: 20 January 1947 (age 78)

Sport
- Sport: Equestrian

Ángel Boyenechea (born 20 January 1947) is an Argentine equestrian. He competed in two events at the 1976 Summer Olympics.
