= Cathy Wedge =

Canadian equestrian

- Born: Catherine Wedge; 29 December 1950 (age 75); Saskatoon, Saskatchewan, Canada
- Occupation: Judge
- Known for: 1978 Equestrian Team Gold
- Partner: Leslie Hall Pinder (2014–2021; Pinder's death)

Cathy Wedge
Medal record

Equestrian

Representing Canada

World Championships
Gold medal – first place	1978 Lexington	Team eventing

Pan American Games
Gold medal – first place	1971 Cali	Team eventing

Catherine "Cathy" Wedge (born 29 December 1950) is a Canadian jurist who has served as a justice of the Supreme Court of British Columbia since 2001. She is also a retired equestrian who rode several times on the Canadian Equestrian Team between 1971 and 1978.

== Early years ==
Catherine Wedge was born on 29 December 1950 in Saskatoon, Saskatchewan, Canada. Her father was a lawyer and her mother was a justice of the Court of Queen's Bench for Saskatchewan. Her maternal grandfather was Emmett Matthew Hall, a justice of the Supreme Court of Canada. Wedge began to ride at the Saskatoon Pony Club when she was eight. Wynona Mulcaster was the unpaid instructor at the club from 1945 to 1973 and influenced Wedge's career.

== Equestrian career ==
Wedge entered international competition in 1969, when she won the Working Hunter Championship at the Seattle International Horse Show. At the 1971 Pan American Games in Cali, Colombia she won gold in the three-day team event riding her horse "Sumatra". She was named to the Canadian Olympic team for 1972, but could not compete due to a broken leg. In 1974 she won the Canadian three-day-event on "City Fella". In 1975 Wedge received serious arm and leg injuries in a competition in Massachusetts shortly before an event in Bromont, Quebec where she was scheduled to be part of the Canadian team. The coordinator of the event called her "the most artistic rider we had".

Cathy Wedge, 173 centimetres (68 in) and 57 kilograms (126 lb), represented Canada in the 1976 Summer Olympics in Montreal. She again rode "City Fella". She placed 23rd in the mixed three-day individual equestrianism event, and her team placed 6th in the mixed three-day team equestrianism event. Wedge rode "Abracadabra" in the Canadian team that won gold at the 1978 Eventing World Championship. "Abracadabra" was the second horse of team captain Elizabeth Ashton.

== Legal career ==
Wedge received a law degree from the University of Saskatchewan in 1980 and was admitted to the B.C. bar the following year. She specialized in labour and employment law and was appointed to the Supreme Court of British Columbia by justice minister Anne McLellan in 2001. In 2007 she presided over a civil trial between Francesco Aquilini and former business partners Tom Gaglardi and Ryan Beedie over Aquilini's purchase of the Vancouver Canucks. She ruled in favour of Aquilini.
