= Juan Roberto Redon =

Mexican equestrian

Personal information
- Nationality: Mexican
- Born: 26 November 1950 (age 74)

Sport
- Sport: Equestrian

Juan Roberto Redon (born 26 November 1950) is a Mexican equestrian. He competed at the 1976 Summer Olympics and the 1984 Summer Olympics.
