= Otto Ammermann =

German equestrian

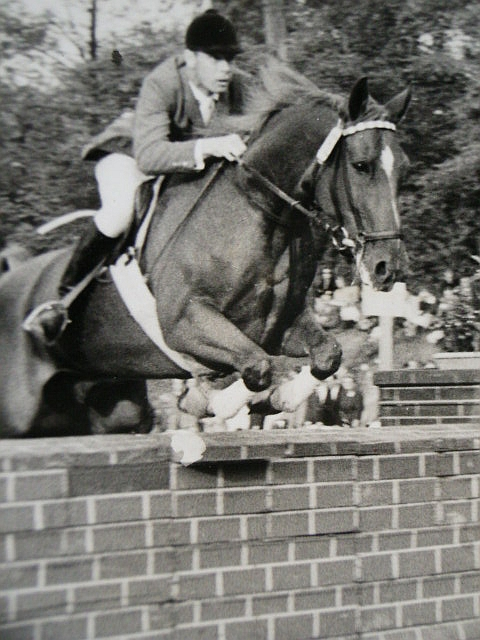

Medal record

Equestrian

Representing West Germany

Olympic Games
Silver medal – second place	1976 Montreal	Team eventing

World Championships
Silver medal – second place	1978 Lexington	Team eventing

European Championships
Bronze medal – third place	1969 Haras-du-Pin	Team eventing

Otto Ammermann (born 7 September 1932 in Stadland) is a German equestrian and Olympic medalist. He competed in eventing at the 1976 Summer Olympics in Montreal, and won a silver medal with the German team.
