= Jean-Yves Touzaint =

French equestrian

Personal information
- Nationality: French
- Born: 8 October 1948 (age 76)

Sport
- Sport: Equestrian

Jean-Yves Touzaint (born 8 October 1948) is a French equestrian. He competed in two events at the 1976 Summer Olympics.
