= Denis Pigott =

Australian equestrian (born 1946)

Personal information
- Born: 15 October 1946 (age 79)
Medal record
Equestrian
Olympic Games
Representing Australia
Bronze medal – third place	1976 Montreal	Eventing, Team

Denis Pigott (born 15 October 1946) is an Australian equestrian. He won a bronze medal in team eventing at the 1976 Summer Olympics in Montreal, and placed 20th in individual eventing.
