= Edmund Coffin =

American saddlemaker and equestrian

Personal information
- Full name: Edmund Sloane Coffin
- Nickname: Tad
- Born: May 9, 1955 (age 71) Toledo, Ohio, U.S.
Medal record
Equestrian
Representing the United States
Olympic Games
Gold medal – first place	1976 Montreal	Individual eventing
Gold medal – first place	1976 Montreal	Team eventing
World Championships
Bronze medal – third place	1978 Lexington	Team eventing
Pan American Games
Gold medal – first place	1975 Mexico City	Individual eventing
Gold medal – first place	1975 Mexico City	Team eventing

Edmund Sloane "Tad" Coffin (born May 9, 1955, in Toledo, Ohio) is an American saddlemaker and equestrian. Coffin won two gold medals in the 1976 Summer Olympics in Montreal riding Bally Cor. He grew up on Long Island, then moved with his family to Strafford, Vermont, but now lives in Charlottesville, Virginia. He is the nephew of clergyman and peace activist William Sloane Coffin.
