= Mary Anne Tauskey =

American equestrian

Personal information
- Born: December 3, 1955 (age 70) Suffern, New York, United States
Medal record
Equestrian
Representing the United States
Olympic Games
Gold medal – first place	1976 Montreal	Team eventing

Mary Anne Tauskey (born December 3, 1955, in Suffern, New York) is an American equestrian and Olympic medalist. She was a member of the gold medal team in eventing at the 1976 Summer Olympics in Montreal, Quebec, Canada. Riding Marcus Aurelius, Mary Anne Tauskey placed 20th and, as the high scorer on the U.S. team, her result was not taken into account when calculating the team scores. She was also a member of the 1975 Pan Am Games eventing gold medal team and was named USEA Rider of the Year in 1977.
