= Equestrian events at the 1976 Summer Olympics =

Equestrian at the Games of the XXI Olympiad
- Venue: Olympic Equestrian Centre; Olympic Stadium
- Dates: 23 July – 1 August 1976
- No. of events: 6
- Competitors: 135 from 23 nations

The equestrian events at the 1976 Summer Olympics in Montreal included show jumping, dressage and eventing. All three disciplines, except for the Nations Cup, were held at the equestrian stadium in Bromont, which had a capacity of 15,000 spectators, and the cross-country and steeplechase were also nearby. Building this stadium provided some headache for the Organizing Committee after the original estimate of 1 million Canadian dollars increased to CAD 4,425.

Poland and Chile were not allowed to ship horses into the host country due to the concern of piroplasmosis, and France and Italy also had to keep some horses home due to veterinary regulations. Overall 23 nations competed: Argentina, Australia, Austria, Belgium, Bolivia, Canada, Denmark, France, Federal Republic of Germany (FRG), Great Britain, Guatemala, Ireland, Italy, Japan, Mexico, Netherlands, Puerto Rico, the Soviet Union, Spain, Sweden, Switzerland, Uruguay, and the US, with the Montreal Games being the first for Guatemala and Puerto Rico in equestrian events.

The 1976 Olympics was also the first Games with a disqualification due to a positive equine drug test, after San Carlos, ridden by Ronald McMahon of Ireland, received treatment following an injury during transport. Although the treatment was needed, the rules did not allow for him to compete.

== Disciplines ==
=== Show jumping ===
Tom Gayford, assisted by Robert Jolicoeur, built the massive courses ridden by 61 riders from 20 countries. All courses were to be ridden at 400 m/min, and had 15 obstacles with 18 jumping efforts, including a 5m water. Round A, 950 meters in length, had verticals up to 1.60 meters and a 2.20 meter wide oxer with a 1.55 meter front rail and a back rail at 1.60 meters. Round B (660 meters) had a narrow 1.70 meter vertical, and the oxers were also raised in height. The final jump off was 470 meters long. Only 39-year-old Alwin Schockemöhle was able to pull off two clear rounds to win gold. The next three highest placed riders had 12 penalties apiece, and they had to jump off for silver and bronze.

The Nations Cup was held in the Olympic Stadium in front of 55,000 spectators, despite a great debate to move it to Bromont after intense rain. However, course dimensions were reduced. Alwin Schockemöhle managed to complete the 2 Nations Cup courses with 4 and 8 penalties respectively, helping Germany finish with team silver.

=== Dressage ===
The 10-minute Grand Prix dressage test was ridden by 27 riders from 11 nations. The Grand Prix awarded up to 500 points per judge—2500 points total—with Christine Stückelberger winning the test on Granat with 1869 points (74.7%). The top 12 riders from the Grand Prix competed in a second test, the Grand Prix Special. The Special, with an 8-minute 45 second time allowed, was also won by Granat with 1486 out of 1950 possible points (76.2%), earning Stückelberger the individual gold medal. They finished 51 points ahead of silver medal winner Harry Boldt and Woycek, who was 40 points ahead of the bronze medal winners, Reiner Klimke riding Mehmed.

The favorites for the team competition were Germany, Switzerland, and the Soviet Union to medal, but the US managed to clinch the bronze ahead of the USSR for their first dressage medal since the 1948 Games.

=== Eventing ===
49 riders from 13 countries competed, including Princess Anne from Great Britain, becoming the first member of the British Royal Family to have participated in the Olympic games. There were also several sets of family members: Guatemala had a mother and daughter pair competing on their team (Rita and Silvia de Luna), while Australia had a father and son (Bill and Wayne Roycroft). The cross-country course designer, Barbara Kemp, was the first woman to design an Olympic equestrian course. It wouldn't be until 1996 when show jumping would have its first woman course designer with Linda Allen. The endurance day track was 27,465 meters in length, of which 7,695 meters was a 36-obstacle cross-country course. The track was very varied, traveling over meadows (2300 meters), gravel roads (1300 meters), through the woods (900 meters) as well as a manicured golf course (3200 meters).

== Medal summary ==
Games	Gold	Silver	Bronze
Individual dressage	Christine Stückelberger on Granat; Switzerland	Harry Boldt on Woycek; West Germany	Reiner Klimke on Mehmed; West Germany
Team dressage	West Germany; Harry Boldt on Woycek; Reiner Klimke on Mehmed; Gabriela Grillo on Ultimo	Switzerland; Christine Stückelberger on Granat; Ulrich Lehmann on Widin; Doris Ramseier on Roch	United States; Hilda Gurney on Keen; Dorothy Morkis on Monaco; Edith Master on Dahlwitz
Individual eventing	Edmund Coffin on Bally-Cor; United States	Michael Plumb on Better & Better; United States	Karl Schultz on Madrigal; West Germany
Team eventing	United States; Edmund Coffin on Bally-Cor; Michael Plumb on Better & Better; Bruce Davidson on Irish-Cap; Mary Anne Tauskey on Marcus Aurelius	West Germany; Karl Schultz on Madrigal; Herbert Blöcker on Albrant; Helmut Rethemeier on Pauline; Otto Ammermann on Volturno	Australia; Wayne Roycroft on Laurenson; Mervyn Bennet on Regal Reign; Bill Roycroft on Version; Denis Pigott on Hillstead
Individual jumping	Alwin Schockemöhle on Warwick Rex; West Germany	Michel Vaillancourt on Branch County; Canada	François Mathy on Gai Luron; Belgium
Team jumping	France; Hubert Parot on Rivage; Jean-Marcel Rozier on Bayard de Maupas; Marc Roguet on Belle de Mars; Michel Roche on Un Espoir	West Germany; Alwin Schockemöhle on Warwick Rex; Hans Günter Winkler on Torphy; Sönke Sönksen on Kwepe; Paul Schockemöhle on Agent	Belgium; Eric Wauters on Gute Sitte; François Mathy on Gai Luron; Edgar-Henri Cuepper on Le Champion; Stanny Van Paesschen on Porsche

== Participating nations ==
In the 1976 Summer Olympics, 135 contestants, including 111 men and 24 women, competed from 23 countries. The youngest participant was Silvia de Luna from Guatemala at 18 years old, while the oldest rider was the Australian Bill Roycroft at 61 years old.

== Medal table ==
Rank	Nation	Gold	Silver	Bronze	Total
1	West Germany	2	3	2	7
2	United States	2	1	1	4
3	Switzerland	1	1	0	2
4	France	1	0	0	1
5	Canada	0	1	0	1
6	Belgium	0	0	2	2
7	Australia	0	0	1	1
Totals (7 entries)		6	6	6	18

== Officials ==
Appointment of officials was as follows:

Dressage

- (Sweden) Gustaf Nyblæus (Ground Jury President)
- (United States) Donald Thackeray (Ground Jury Member)
- (Denmark) H. Sommer (Ground Jury Member)
- (Netherlands) Jaap Pot (Ground Jury Member)
- (United Kingdom) Johanna Hall (Ground Jury Member)

Jumping

- (Italy) Bruno Bruni (Ground Jury President)
- (Poland) Eryk Brabec (Ground Jury Member)
- (Canada) Doug Catto (Ground Jury Member)
- (Canada) Tom Gayford (Course Designer)
- (Italy) Giovanni Marcone (Technical Delegate)

Eventing

- (West Germany) Edwin Rothkirch (Ground Jury President)
- (Brazil) Franco Pontes (Ground Jury Member)
- (Italy) Fabio Mangilli (Ground Jury Member)
- (West Germany) Ottokar Pohlmann (Course Designer)
- (France) Bernard Chevalier (Technical Delegate)
