= Equestrian at the 1972 Summer Olympics – Team eventing =

Team eventing at the Games of the XX Olympiad
- Venue: Riding Facility; Nymphenburg Palace; Olympiastadion
- Date: 29 August–1 September 1972
- Competitors: 72 from 18 nations

Medalists
1st place, gold medalist(s)		Mary Gordon-Watson; Richard Meade; Bridget Parker; Mark Phillips	Great Britain
2nd place, silver medalist(s)		Bruce Davidson; Kevin Freeman; Michael Plumb; James C. Wofford	United States
3rd place, bronze medalist(s)		Ludwig Gössing; Horst Karsten; Harry Klugmann; Karl Schultz	West Germany

The team eventing at the 1972 Summer Olympics took place between 29 August and 1 September. The event was open to men and women.

== Competition format ==
The competition included three segments: dressage, cross-country, and show-jumping. Penalties from each were summed to give a total score. Teams consisted of four horse and rider pairs, though only the best three scores counted for the team total. If a team had fewer than three pairs finish, the team received no score.

== Results ==
=== Final standings after jumping ===
Rank	Nation	Individual results		Total
Rank	Nation	Rider	Total	Total
1st place, gold medalist(s)	Great Britain	Richard Meade	57.73	95.53
1st place, gold medalist(s)	Great Britain	Mary Gordon-Watson	30.27	95.53
1st place, gold medalist(s)	Great Britain	Bridget Parker	7.53	95.53
1st place, gold medalist(s)	Great Britain	Mark Phillips	~~-134.33~~	95.53
2nd place, silver medalist(s)	United States	Kevin Freeman	29.87	10.81
2nd place, silver medalist(s)	United States	Bruce Davidson	24.47	10.81
2nd place, silver medalist(s)	United States	J. Michael Plumb	-43.53	10.81
2nd place, silver medalist(s)	United States	Jimmy Wofford	~~-99.83~~	10.81
3rd place, bronze medalist(s)	West Germany	Harry Klugmann	8.00	-18.00
3rd place, bronze medalist(s)	West Germany	Ludwig Gössing	-0.40	-18.00
3rd place, bronze medalist(s)	West Germany	Karl Schultz	-25.60	-18.00
3rd place, bronze medalist(s)	West Germany	Horst Karsten	DNF	-18.00
4	Australia	Bill Roycroft	29.60	-27.86
4	Australia	Richard Sands	24.87	-27.86
4	Australia	Brian Schrapel	-82.33	-27.86
4	Australia	Clarke Roycroft	-296.12	-27.86
5	East Germany	Rudolf Beerbohm	3.80	-127.93
5	East Germany	Jens Niehls	-60.00	-127.93
5	East Germany	Joachim Brohmann	-71.73	-127.93
5	East Germany	Helmut Gille	-74.20	-127.93
6	Switzerland	Paul Hürlimann	-11.03	-156.43
6	Switzerland	Tony Bühler	-19.87	-156.43
6	Switzerland	Alfred Schwarzenbach	-125.53	-156.43
6	Switzerland	Max Hauri	DNF	-156.43
7	Soviet Union	Sergey Mukhin	-0.13	-190.06
7	Soviet Union	Valentin Gorelkin	-34.93	-190.06
7	Soviet Union	Vladimir Lanyugin	-155.00	-190.06
7	Soviet Union	Mamadzhan Ismailov	DNF	-190.06
8	Italy	Alessandro Argenton	43.33	-203.58
8	Italy	Dino Costantini	-98.18	-203.58
8	Italy	Mario Turner	-148.73	-203.58
8	Italy	Stefano Angioni	DNF	-203.58
9	Ireland	Bill Buller	-56.13	-219.41
9	Ireland	Ronnie McMahon	-67.33	-219.41
9	Ireland	Patrick Conolly-Carew	-95.95	-219.41
9	Ireland	Bill McLernon	DNF	-219.41
10	Poland	Jacek Wierzchowiecki	-30.47	-281.60
10	Poland	Marek Małecki	-109.00	-281.60
10	Poland	Jan Skoczylas	-142.13	-281.60
10	Poland	Wojciech Mickunas	DNF	-281.60
11	France	Michel Robert	-27.13	-338.56
11	France	Armand Bigot	-133.80	-338.56
11	France	Dominique Bentejac	-177.63	-338.56
11	France	François Fabius	~~-205.40~~	-338.56
12	Austria	Ferdinand Croy	-54.27	-485.60
12	Austria	Friedrich Resch	-172.80	-485.60
12	Austria	Wolf-Dieter Rihs	-258.53	-485.60
12	Austria	Rüdiger Wassibauer	DNF	-485.60
–	Canada	Jim Henry	-124.67	DNF
–	Canada	Wendy Irving	-248.60	DNF
–	Canada	Robin Hahn	DNF	DNF
–	Canada	Clint Banbury	DNF	DNF
–	Bulgaria	Yordan Ivanov	-173.75	DNF
–	Bulgaria	Boris Stefanov	DNF	DNF
–	Bulgaria	Gocho Milev	DNF	DNF
–	Bulgaria	Nikola Dimitrov	DNF	DNF
–	Hungary	István Szabácsy	-153.13	DNF
–	Hungary	József Horváth	DNF	DNF
–	Hungary	József Varró	DNF	DNF
–	Hungary	János Krizsán	DNF	DNF
–	Netherlands	Piet van der Schans	-309.13	DNF
–	Netherlands	Eddy Stibbe	DNF	DNF
–	Netherlands	Hans Brugman	DNF	DNF
–	Netherlands	Maarten Jurgens	DNF	DNF
–	Argentina	Gerardo Jáuregui	-301.32	DNF
–	Argentina	José Eugenio Acosta	DNF	DNF
–	Argentina	Carlos Alberto Alvarado	DNF	DNF
–	Argentina	Alejandro Guglielmi	DNF	DNF
–	Mexico	Manuel Mendívil	DNF	DNF
–	Mexico	Maríano Bucio	DNF	DNF
–	Mexico	Ramón Mejía	DNF	DNF
–	Mexico	David Bárcena	DNF	DNF
