= Equestrian at the 1972 Summer Olympics – Individual eventing =

Equestrian at the Olympics

Individual eventing at the Games of the XX Olympiad
- Venue: Riding Facility
- Date: 29 August–1 September 1972
- Competitors: 73 from 19 nations

Medalists
1st place, gold medalist(s)		Richard Meade	Great Britain
2nd place, silver medalist(s)		Alessandro Argenton	Italy
3rd place, bronze medalist(s)		Jan Jönsson	Sweden

The individual eventing at the 1972 Summer Olympics took place between 29 August and 1 September. The event was open to men and women. The competition included three segments: dressage, cross-country, and show jumping. Penalties from each were summed to give a total score.

== Results ==
Rank	Name	Country	Points
1	Richard Meade	Great Britain	57.73
2	Alessandro Argenton	Italy	43.33
3	Jan Jönsson	Sweden	39.67
4	Mary Gordon-Watson	Great Britain	30.27
5	Kevin Freeman	United States	29.87
6	Bill Roycroft	Australia	29.60
7	Richard Sands	Australia	24.87
8	Bruce Davidson	United States	24.47
9	Harry Klugmann	West Germany	8.00
10	Bridget Parker	Great Britain	7.53
11	Rudolf Beerbohm	East Germany	3.80
12	Sergey Mukhin	Soviet Union	−0.13
13	Ludwig Gössing	West Germany	−0.40
14	Paul Hürlimann	Switzerland	−11.03
15	Tony Bühler	Switzerland	−19.87
16	Karl Schultz	West Germany	−25.60
17	Michel Robert	France	−27.13
18	Jacek Wierzchowiecki	Poland	−30.47
19	Valentin Gorelkin	Soviet Union	−34.93
20	Michael Plumb	United States	−43.53
21	Ferdinand Croy	Austria	−54.27
22	Bill Buller	Ireland	−56.13
23	Jens Niehls	East Germany	−60.00
24	Ronnie McMahon	Ireland	−67.33
25	Joachim Brohmann	East Germany	−71.73
26	Helmut Gille	East Germany	−74.20
27	Brian Schrapel	Australia	−82.33
28	Patrick Conolly-Carew	Ireland	−95.95
29	Dino Costantini	Italy	−98.18
30	James C. Wofford	United States	−99.83
31	Marek Małecki	Poland	−109.00
32	Jim Henry	Canada	−124.67
33	Alfred Schwarzenbach	Switzerland	−125.53
34	Armand Bigot	France	−133.80
35	Mark Phillips	Great Britain	−134.33
36	Jan Skoczylas	Poland	−142.13
37	Mario Turner	Italy	−148.73
38	István Szabácsy	Hungary	−153.13
39	Vladimir Lanyugin	Soviet Union	−155.00
40	Friedrich Resch	Austria	−172.80
41	Yordan Ivanov	Bulgaria	−173.75
42	Dominique Bentejac	France	−177.63
43	François Fabius	France	−205.40
44	Wendy Irving	Canada	−248.60
45	Wolf-Dieter Rihs	Austria	−258.53
46	Clarke Roycroft	Australia	−296.12
47	Gerardo Jáuregui	Argentina	−301.32
48	Piet van der Schans	Netherlands	−309.13
AC	Horst Karsten	West Germany	DNF
AC	Manuel Mendívil	Mexico	DNF
AC	Robin Hahn	Canada	DNF
AC	Wojciech Mickunas	Poland	DNF
AC	Eddy Stibbe	Netherlands	DNF
AC	Bill McLernon	Ireland	DNF
AC	Max Hauri	Switzerland	DNF
AC	Stefano Angioni	Italy	DNF
AC	Boris Stefanov	Bulgaria	DNF
AC	Maríano Bucio	Mexico	DNF
AC	Mamadzhan Ismailov	Soviet Union	DNF
AC	József Horváth	Hungary	DNF
AC	József Varró	Hungary	DNF
AC	Rüdiger Wassibauer	Austria	DNF
AC	Ramón Mejía	Mexico	DNF
AC	José Eugenio Acosta	Argentina	DNF
AC	Carlos Alberto Alvarado	Argentina	DNF
AC	Alejandro Guglielmi	Argentina	DNF
AC	David Bárcena Ríos	Mexico	DNF
AC	János Krizsán	Hungary	DNF
AC	Gocho Milev	Bulgaria	DNF
AC	Hans Brugman	Netherlands	DNF
AC	Clint Banbury	Canada	DNF
AC	Nikola Dimitrov	Bulgaria	DNF
AC	Maarten Jurgens	Netherlands	DNF
