= 2018 in equestrianism =

== FEI World Equestrian Games ==
- September 11 – 23: 2018 FEI World Equestrian Games in (United States) Mill Spring, North Carolina (Tryon International Equestrian Center)
  - Germany won both the gold and overall medal tallies.

== 2018 Rolex Grand Slam of Show Jumping ==
- March 8 – 11: The Dutch Masters 2018 (GSSJ #1) in (Netherlands) 's-Hertogenbosch (debut event)
  - Winner: (Belgium) Niels Bruynseels with horse Gancia de Muze
- July 12 – 21: CHIO Aachen 2018 (GSSJ #2) in (Germany) Aachen
  - Winner: (Germany) Marcus Ehning with horse Prêt à tout
- September 5 – 9: 2018 CSIO Spruce Meadows “Masters” (GSSJ #3) in (Canada) Calgary
  - Winner: (Egypt) Sameh El Dahan with horse Suma's Zorro
- December 6 – 9: The CHI Geneva, Switzerland, 2018 (GSSJ #4; final) in Geneva
  - Winner: (Germany) Marcus Ehning with horse Prêt à tout

== 2018 Global Champions Tour ==
- March 22 – 25: LGCT #1 in Mexico City Winner: (United Kingdom) Scott Brash (with horse Ursula XII)
- April 5 – 7: LGCT #2 in (United States) Miami Beach Winner: (Australia) Edwina Tops-Alexander (with horse California)
- April 20 – 22: LGCT #3 in (China) Shanghai Winner: (Belgium) Grégory Wathelet (with horse Coree)
- May 4 – 6: LGCT #4 in (Spain) Madrid Winner: (United Kingdom) Ben Maher (with horse Explosion W)
- May 10 – 12: LGCT #5 in (Germany) Hamburg Winner: (Netherlands) Harrie Smolders (with horse Don VHP Z)
- May 31 – June 2: LGCT #6 in (France) Ramatuelle-Saint-Tropez Winner: (United Kingdom) Ben Maher (with horse Winning Good)
- June 7 – 9: LGCT #7 in (France) Cannes Winner: (Sweden) Peder Fredricson (with horse Hansson WL)
- June 14 – 16: LGCT #8 in (Portugal) Cascais-Estoril Winner: (Belgium) Nicola Philippaerts (with horse H&M Harley vd Bisschop)
- June 28 – 30: LGCT #9 in Monaco Winner: (Republic of Ireland) Shane Breen (with horse Ipswich van de Wolfsakker)
- July 5 – 7: LGCT #10 in (France) Paris Winner: (Egypt) Sameh El Dahan (with horse Suma's Zorro)
- July 13 – 15: LGCT #11 in (France) Chantilly Winner: (Belgium) Nicola Philippaerts (with horse H&M Chilli Willi)
- July 27 – 29: LGCT #12 in (Germany) Berlin Winner: (Italy) Alberto Zorzi (with horse Fair Light van T Heike)
- August 3 – 5: LGCT #13 in (United Kingdom) London Winner: (United Kingdom) Scott Brash (with horse Hello Mr President)
- August 10 – 12: LGCT #14 in (Netherlands) Valkenswaard Winner: (Netherlands) Frank Schuttert (with horse Chianti's Champion)
- September 6 – 9: LGCT #15 in (Italy) Rome Winner: (United Kingdom) Ben Maher (with horse Explosion W)
- November 8 – 10: LGCT #16 in (Qatar) Doha Winner: (United Kingdom) Ben Maher (with horse Explosion W)
- December 13 – 16: LGCT #17 (final) in (Czech Republic) Prague Winner: (Belgium) Jérôme Guery (with horse Garfield de Tiji des Templiers)

== 2017–18 FEI World Cup Jumping ==
- April 8, 2017 – December 2, 2017: 2017 FEI World Cup Jumping – Japan League
  - Winner: (Japan) Keisuke Koike (with horses Nosco de Blondel & Van Schijndel's Diamond)
- April 20, 2017 – June 25, 2017: 2017 FEI World Cup Jumping – Central Asian League
  - Winner: (Uzbekistan) Nurjon Tuyakbaev (with horse King Cornet L)
- April 29, 2017 – October 8, 2017: 2017 FEI World Cup Jumping – China League
  - Winner: (China) Liang Ruiji (with horse Indiana van't Heike)
- May 4, 2017 – November 26, 2017: 2017 FEI World Cup Jumping – South America League
  - North SAL winner: (Colombia) Santiago Medina (with horses Monterrey EJC & Concorde)
  - South SAL winners (tie): (Brazil) Felipe Amaral (with horse Premiere Carthoes BZ) & (Brazil) Artemus de Almeida (with horse Cassilano Jmen)
- May 11, 2017 – October 29, 2017: 2017 FEI World Cup Jumping – (South Africa) South African League
  - Winner: (South Africa) Lisa Williams (with horse Campbell)
- June 2, 2017 – October 8, 2017: 2017 FEI World Cup Jumping – Caucasus League
  - Winner: (Georgia (country)) Shalva Gachechiladze (with 3 different horses)
- June 7, 2017 – March 4, 2018: 2017–18 FEI World Cup Jumping – Central European League
  - North CEL winner: (Estonia) Urmas Raag (with horses Ibelle van de Grote Haart & Carlos)
  - South CEL winner: (Hungary) Mariann Hugyecz (with horse Chacco Boy)
    - March 1 – 4: 2018 FEI Central European League Final in (Poland) Warsaw
      - Winner: (Poland) Jaroslaw Skrzyczynski (with horse Chacclana)
      - Overall CEL winner: (Estonia) Urmas Raag
- August 2, 2017 – March 18, 2018: 2017–18 FEI World Cup Jumping – North American League
  - Eastern NAL winner: (Switzerland) Beat Mändli (with horses Dsarie & Galan S)
  - Western NAL winner: (United States) Richard Spooner (with 3 different horses)
- August 5, 2017 – December 10, 2017: 2017 FEI World Cup Jumping – (Australia) Australian League
  - Winner: (Australia) Billy Raymont (with horses Anton & Oaks Redwood)
- September 21, 2017 – February 3, 2018: 2017–18 FEI World Cup Jumping – Arab League
  - Winner: (Jordan) Ibrahim Bisharat (with 4 different horses)
- October 6, 2017 – December 17, 2017: 2017 FEI World Cup Jumping – South East Asian League
  - Winner: (Thailand) Jaruporn Limpichati (with horse Irregular Choice)
- October 12, 2017 – February 25, 2018: 2017–18 FEI World Cup Jumping – (European Union) Western European League
  - Winner: (Sweden) Henrik von Eckermann (with horses May Lou 194 & Newton Abbot)
- October 18, 2017 – January 14, 2018: 2017–18 FEI World Cup Jumping – New Zealand League
  - Winner: (New Zealand) Rose Alfeld (with horse My Super Nova)

== 2017–18 FEI World Cup Dressage ==
- March 23, 2017 – March 25, 2018: 2017 FEI World Cup Dressage – Pacific League
  - Winner: (Australia) Mary Hanna (with horse Calanta)
- April 19, 2017 – December 3, 2017: 2017 FEI World Cup Dressage – Central European League
  - Winner: (Russia) Inessa Merkulova (with horses Avans and Mister X)
- April 27, 2017 – March 4, 2018: 2017–18 FEI World Cup Dressage – North American League
  - Winner: (United States) Laura Graves (with horse Verdades)
- October 18, 2017 – March 11, 2018: 2017–18 FEI World Cup Dressage – Western European League
  - Winner: (Sweden) Patrik Kittel (with horses Delaunay Old and Deja)

== 2018 Show Jumping World Cup and Dressage World Cup Finals ==
- April 10 – 15: 2018 FEI World Cup Show Jumping and Dressage Finals in (France) Paris
  - Show Jumping winner: (United States) Beezie Madden (with horse Breitling LS)
  - Dressage winner: (Germany) Isabell Werth (with horse Weihegold OLD)

== 2018 FEI Nations Cup Jumping ==
- February 13 – 18: NCJ #1 in (United States) Ocala
  - Individual winners (tie): (Canada) Ian Millar (with horse Dixson) & (Canada) Eric Lamaze (with horse Coco Bongo)
  - Team winners: Canada (Francois Lamontagne (with horse Chanel du Calvaire), Tiffany Foster (with horse Brighton), Ian Millar (with horse Dixson), & Eric Lamaze (with horse Coco Bongo))
- February 14 – 17: NCJ #2 in (United Arab Emirates) Abu Dhabi
  - Individual winners (tie): (New Zealand) Samantha McIntosh (with horse Check In 2) & (Republic of Ireland) David Simpson (with horse Keoki)
  - Team winners: New Zealand (Daniel Meech (with horse Fine), Richard Gardner (with horse Calisto), Bruce Goodin (with horse Backatorps Danny V), & Samantha McIntosh (with horse Check In 2))
- April 19 – 22: NCJ #3 in (Mexico) Coapexpan
  - Individual winners (tie): (Canada) Jonathon Millar (with horse Daveau) & (United States) Alex Granato (with horse Carlchen W)
  - Team winners: Canada (Laura Jane Tidball (with horse Concetto Son), Jenn Serek (with horse Wicked), Jonathon Millar (with horse Daveau), & Keean White (with horse For Freedom Z))
- April 26 – 29: NCJ #4 in (Slovakia) Šamorín
  - Individual winner: (Belgium) Nicola Philippaerts (with horse H&M Chilli Willi)
  - Team winners: Switzerland (Werner Muff (with horse Daimler), Paul Estermann (with horse Curtis Sitte), Martin Fuchs (with horse Chaplin), & Steve Guerdat (with horse Hannah))
- May 17 – 20: NCJ #5 in (France) La Baule-Escoublac
  - Individual winners (tie): (Germany) Maurice Tebbel (with horse Chaccos' Son), (Netherlands) Harrie Smolders (with horse Don VHP Z), & (Spain) Manuel Fernández Saro (with horse Cannavaro 9)
  - Team winners: Brazil (Luiz Felipe de Azevedo (with horse Chaccomo), Felipe Amaral (with horse Germanico T), Yuri Mansur (with horse Vitiki), & Pedro Veniss (with horse Quabri de L'Isle))
- May 29 – June 3: NCJ #6 in (Canada) Langley
  - Individual winners (tie): (Canada) Tiffany Foster (with horse Victor) & (Republic of Ireland) Richie Moloney (with horse Carrabis Z)
  - Team winners: Ireland (Richie Moloney (with horse Carrabis Z), Capt. Brian Cournane (with horse Dino), Daniel Coyle (with horse Cita), & Conor Swail (with horse Rubens LS la Silla))
- May 31 – June 3: NCJ #7 in (Switzerland) St. Gallen
  - Individual winners (tie): Six different show jumpers won first place in this event.
  - Team winners: France (Mathieu Billot (with horse Shiva d'Amaury), Alexandra Francart (with horse Volnay du Boisdeville), Nicolas Delmotte (with horse Ilex VP), & Olivier Robert (with horse Eros))
- June 14 – 17: NCJ #8 in (Poland) Sopot
  - Individual winner: (France) Olivier Robert (with horse Eros)
  - Team winners: Belgium (Olivier Philippaerts (with horse H&M Ikker), Pieter Devos (with horse Claire Z), Jérôme Guery (with horse Garfield de Tiji des Templiers), & Niels Bruynseels (with horse Cas de Liberte))
- June 21 – 24: NCJ #9 in (Netherlands) Rotterdam
  - Individual winners (tie): Seven different show jumpers won first place in this event.
  - Team winners: Belgium (Nicola Philippaerts (with horse H&M Chilli Willi), Niels Bruynseels (with horse Cas de Liberte), Jos Verlooy (with horse Igor), & Pieter Devos (with horse Espoir))
- July 12 – 15: NCJ #10 in (Sweden) Falsterbo
  - Individual winner: (Netherlands) Jur Vrieling (with horse VDL Glasgow V. Merelsnest N.O.P.)
  - Team winners: Netherlands (Maikel van der Vleuten (with horse Idi Utopia), Michel Hendrix (with horse Baileys), Johnny Pals (with horse Chat Botte du Ruisseau Z), & Jur Vrieling (with horse VDL Glasgow V. Merelsnest N.O.P.))
- July 26 – 29: NCJ #11 in (United Kingdom) Hickstead
  - Individual winner: (Brazil) Marlon Modolo Zanotelli (with horse Sirene de la Motte)
  - Team winners: Ireland (Trevor Breen (with horse Bombay), Richie Moloney (with horse Freestyle de Muze), Michael Duffy (with horse EFS Top Contender), & Anthony Condon (with horse SFS Aristio))
- August 8 – 12: NCJ #12 in (Republic of Ireland) Dublin
  - Individual winner: (Mexico) Patricio Pasquel (with horse Babel)
  - Team winners: Mexico (Eugenio Garza Perez (with horse Victer Finn DH Z), Federico Fernández (with horse Landpeter do Feroleto), Patricio Pasquel (with horse Babel), & Enrique González (with horse Chacna))
- August 9 – 12: NCJ #13 in (Hungary) Budapest
  - Individual winner: (Austria) Felix Koller (with horse Captain Future 3)
  - Team winners: Austria (Christian Rhomberg (with horse Saphyr des Lacs), Julia Houtzager-Kayser (with horse Sterrehof's Cayetano Z), Felix Koller (with horse Captain Future 3), & Max Kühner (with horse PSG Final))
- October 4 – 7: 2018 Longines FEI Jumping Nations Cup Final in (Spain) Barcelona
  - Individual winners (tie): Four different show jumpers won first place in this event.
  - Team winners: Belgium (Niels Bruynseels (with horse Gancia de Muze), Pieter Devos (with horse Claire Z), Jos Verlooy (with horse Caracas), & Nicola Philippaerts (with horse H&M Harley V. Bisschop))

== 2018 FEI Nations Cup Dressage ==
- March 27 – 31: NCD #1 in Wellington, Florida
  - Individual winner: (United States) Adrienne Lyle (with horse Salvino)
  - Team winners: United States (Adrienne Lyle (with horse Salvino), Sabine Schut-Kery (with horse Sanceo), Olivia Lagoy-Weltz (with horse Lonoir), Ashley Holzer (with horse Havanna 145))
- May 17 – 20: NCD #2 in (France) Compiègne
  - Individual winner: (Denmark) Cathrine Dufour (with horse Atterupgaards Cassidy)
  - Team winners: Sweden (Antonia Ramel (with horse Brother de Jeu), Rose Mathisen (with horse Zuidenwind 1187), Juliette Ramel (with horse Buriel K.H.), Patrik Kittel (with horse Well Done de la Roche CMF))
- May 23 – 27: NCD #3 in (Denmark) Uggerhalne
  - Individual winner: (Denmark) Daniel Bachmann Andersen (with horse Blue Hors Zepter)
  - Team winners: Sweden (Therese Nilshagen (with horse Dante Weltino Old), Tinne Vilhelmson-Silfvén (with horse Paridon Magi), Jeanna Högberg (with horse Duendecillo P), Paulinda Friberg (with horse Di Lapponia T))
- June 21 – 24: NCD #4 in Rotterdam
  - Individual winner: (Netherlands) Edward Gal (with horse Glock's Zonik N.O.P.)
  - Team winners: Netherlands (Edward Gal (with horse Glock's Zonik N.O.P.), Madeleine Witte-Vrees (with horse Cennin), Emmelie Scholtens (with horse Apache), Hans Peter Minderhoud (with horse Glock's Dream Boy))
- July 12 – 15: NCD #5 in Falsterbo
  - Individual winner: (Sweden) Patrik Kittel (with horse Deja)
  - Team winners: Sweden (Patrik Kittel (with horse Deja), Juliette Ramel (with horse Wall Street JV), Jeanna Högberg (with horse Duendecillo P), Antonia Ramel (with horse Brother de Jeu))
- July 17 – 22: NCD #6 in Aachen
  - Individual winner: (Germany) Isabell Werth (with horse Emilio 107)
  - Team winners: Germany (Isabell Werth (with horse Emilio 107), Helen Langehanenberg (with horse Damsey FRH), Dorothee Schneider (with horse Sammy Davis Jr.), Jessica von Bredow-Werndl (with horse TSF Dalera BB))
- July 26 – 29: NCD #7 (final) in (United Kingdom) Hickstead
  - Individual winner: (France) Pierre Volla (with horse Badinda Altena)
  - Team winners: France (Anne Sophie Serre (with horse Vistoso de Massa), Alexandre Ayache (with horse Zo What), Arnaud Serre (with horse Ultrablue de Massa), Pierre Volla (with horse Badinda Altena))

== 2018 FEI Nations Cup Eventing ==
- April 20 – 22: NCE #1 in (Italy) Vairano Patenora
  - Individual winner: (Netherlands) Alice Naber-Lozeman (with horse Acsi Peter Parker)
  - Team winners: France (Luc Chateau (with horse Propriano de L'Ebat), Maxime Livio (with horse Pica d'Or), Brice Luda (with horse Valere de Bonnieres), & Raphael Cochet (with horse Sherazad de Louviere))
- May 25 – 27: NCE #2 in (United Kingdom) Houghton Hall
  - Individual winner: (United Kingdom) Laura Collett (with horse Mr. Bass)
  - Team winners: Germany (Hanna Knüppel (with horse Carismo 22), Peter Thomsen (with horse Sir Boggles), Ben Leuwer (with horse BGS Urlanmore Prince), & Dirk Schrade (with horse Unteam de la Cense))
- June 29 – July 1: NCE #3 in (Poland) Strzegom
  - Individual winner: (Japan) Yoshiaki Oiwa (with horse Calle 44)
  - Team winners: France (Christopher Six (with horse Totem de Brecey), Maxime Livio (with horse Opium de Verrieres), & François Lemiere (with horse Ogustin du Terroir))
- July 6 – 8: NCE #4 in (United States) The Plains, Virginia
  - Individual winner: (United States) William Coleman (with horse Off The Record)
  - Team winners: Great Britain (Georgie Spence Goss (with horse Halltown Harley), Leslie Law (with horse Voltaire de Tre'), Ben Hobday (with horse Shadow Man), & Sophie Brown (with horse Wil))
- August 11 – 15: NCE #5 in Le Pin-au-Haras
  - Individual winner: (France) Maxime Livio (with horse Pica d'Or)
  - Team winners: France (Maxime Livio (with horse Pica d'Or), Donatien Schauly (with horse Pivoine des Touches), Astier Nicolas (with horse Vinci de la Vigne), & Karim Florent Laghouag (with horse Entebbe de Hus))
- August 24 – 26: NCE #6 in (Republic of Ireland) Millstreet
  - Individual winner: (France) Thomas Carlile (with horse Upsilon)
  - Team winners: France (Thomas Carlile (with horse Upsilon), François Lemiere (with horse Ogustin du Terroir), Christopher Six (with horse Totem de Brecey), & Marie Charlotte Fuss (with horse Anabolia))
- September 21 – 23: NCE #7 in (Belgium) Waregem
  - Individual winner: (Germany) Julia Krajewski (with horse Samourai du Thot)
  - Team winners: Great Britain (Sarah Bullimore (with horse Valentino V), Flora Harris (with horse Amazing), Camilla (Millie) Dumas (with horse Artistiek), & Will Furlong (with horse Collien P2))
- October 11 – 14: NCE #8 (final) in (Netherlands) Boekelo
  - Individual winner: (Germany) Julia Krajewski (with horse Samourai du Thot)
  - Team winners: Germany (Julia Krajewski (with horse Samourai du Thot), Dirk Schrade (with horse Unteam de la Cense), Christoph Wahler (with horse Carjatan S), & Ben Leuwer (with horse BGS Urlanmore Prince))

== Horse racing ==
=== United States ===
US Triple Crown

- May 5: 2018 Kentucky Derby at Churchill Downs
  - Horse: (United States) Justify; Jockey: (United States) Mike E. Smith; Trainer: (United States) Bob Baffert
- May 19: 2018 Preakness Stakes at (Maryland) Pimlico
  - Horse: (United States) Justify; Jockey: (United States) Mike E. Smith; Trainer: (United States) Bob Baffert
- June 9: 2018 Belmont Stakes at (New York (state)) Belmont Park
  - Horse: (United States) Justify; Jockey: (United States) Mike E. Smith; Trainer: (United States) Bob Baffert

Breeders' Cup

- November 2 & 3: 2018 Breeders' Cup at (Kentucky) Churchill Downs.

Other notable races

- January 27: 2018 Pegasus World Cup at (Florida) Gulfstream Park
  - Horse: (United States) Gun Runner; Jockey: (France) Florent Geroux; Trainer: (United States) Steve Asmussen
- June 9: 2018 Metropolitan Handicap at (New York (state)) Belmont Park
  - Horse: (United States) Bee Jersey; Jockey: (Panama) Ricardo Santana Jr.; Trainer: (United States) Steve Asmussen
- July 29: 2018 Haskell Invitational at (New Jersey) Monmouth Park
  - Horse: (United States) Good Magic; Jockey: (United States) Jose Ortiz; Trainer: (United States) Chad Brown
- August 11: 2018 Arlington Million at (Illinois) Arlington Park
  - Horse: (Chile) Robert Bruce; Jockey: (Puerto Rico) Irad Ortiz Jr.; Trainer: (United States) Chad Brown
- August 18: 2018 Pacific Classic Stakes at (California) Del Mar
  - Horse: (United States) Accelerate; Jockey: (Dominican Republic) Joel Rosario; Trainer: (United States) John W. Sadler
- August 25: 2018 Travers Stakes at (New York (state)) Saratoga
  - Horse: (United States) Catholic Boy; Jockey: (Venezuela) Javier Castellano; Trainer: (United States) Jonathan Thomas
- September 29: 2018 Jockey Club Gold Cup at (New York (state)) Belmont Park
  - Horse: (United States) Discreet Lover; Jockey: (Puerto Rico) Manuel Franco; Trainer: (Trinidad and Tobago) Uriah St.Lewis

=== United Kingdom ===
British Classic Races

- May 5: 2018 2,000 Guineas at (United Kingdom) Newmarket
  - Horse: (Japan) Saxon Warrior; Jockey: (Republic of Ireland) Donnacha O'Brien; Trainer: (Republic of Ireland) Aidan O'Brien
- May 6: 2018 1,000 Guineas at (United Kingdom) Newmarket
  - Horse: (United Kingdom) Billesdon Brook; Jockey: (Republic of Ireland) Sean Levey; Trainer: (United Kingdom) Richard Hannon Jr.
- June 1: 2018 Epsom Oaks at (United Kingdom) Epsom
  - Horse: (Republic of Ireland) Forever Together; Jockey: (Republic of Ireland) Donnacha O'Brien; Trainer: (Republic of Ireland) Aidan O'Brien
- June 2: 2018 Epsom Derby at (United Kingdom) Epsom
  - Horse: (Republic of Ireland) Masar; Jockey: (United Kingdom) William Buick; Trainer: (United Kingdom) Charlie Appleby
- September 15: 2018 St Leger at (United Kingdom) Doncaster
  - Horse: (Republic of Ireland) Kew Gardens; Jockey: (United Kingdom) Ryan Moore; Trainer: (Republic of Ireland) Aidan O'Brien

Other notable races and events

- June 19 – 23: Royal Ascot at (United Kingdom) Ascot
- July 28: King George VI & Queen Elizabeth Stakes at (United Kingdom) Ascot
  - Horse: (Republic of Ireland) Poet's Word; Jockey: (United Kingdom) James Doyle; Trainer: (Barbados) Michael Stoute
- August 22: International Stakes at (United Kingdom) York
  - Horse: (United States) Roaring Lion; Jockey: (Republic of Ireland) Oisin Murphy; Trainer: (United Kingdom) John Gosden
- October 20: British Champions Day at (United Kingdom) Ascot

=== Ireland ===
Irish Classic Races

- May 26: 2018 Irish 2,000 Guineas at the (Republic of Ireland) Curragh
  - Horse: (Republic of Ireland) Romanised; Jockey: (Republic of Ireland) Shane Foley; Trainer: (Republic of Ireland) Ken Condon
- May 27: 2018 Irish 1,000 Guineas at the (Republic of Ireland) Curragh
  - Horse: (Republic of Ireland) Alpha Centauri; Jockey: (Republic of Ireland) Colm O'Donoghue; Trainer: (Republic of Ireland) Jessica Harrington
- June 30: 2018 Irish Derby at the (Republic of Ireland) Curragh
  - Horse: (Republic of Ireland) Latrobe; Jockey: (Republic of Ireland) Donnacha O'Brien; Trainer: (Republic of Ireland) Joseph O'Brien
- July 21: 2018 Irish Oaks at the (Republic of Ireland) Curragh
  - Horse: (Republic of Ireland) Sea of Class; Jockey: (United Kingdom) James Doyle; Trainer: (United Kingdom) William Haggas
- September 16: 2018 Irish St. Leger at the (Republic of Ireland) Curragh
  - Horse: (Republic of Ireland) Flag of Honour; Jockey: (United Kingdom) Ryan Moore; Trainer: (Republic of Ireland) Aidan O'Brien

Other notable races

- September 15: 2018 Irish Champion Stakes at (Republic of Ireland) Leopardstown
  - Horse: (United States) Roaring Lion; Jockey: (Republic of Ireland) Oisin Murphy; Trainer: (United Kingdom) John Gosden

=== France ===
French Classic Races

- May 13: 2018 Poule d'Essai des Pouliches (French 1,000 Guineas) at (France) Longchamp
  - Horse: (United Kingdom) Billesdon Brook; Jockey: (Republic of Ireland) Sean Levey; Trainer: (United Kingdom) Richard Hannon Jr.
- May 13: 2018 Poule d'Essai des Poulains (French 2,000 Guineas) at (France) Longchamp
  - Horse: (Japan) Saxon Warrior; Jockey: (Republic of Ireland) Donnacha O’Brien; Trainer: (Republic of Ireland) Aidan O'Brien
- June 3: 2018 Prix du Jockey Club (French Derby) at (France) Chantilly
  - Horse: (Republic of Ireland) Study of Man; Jockey: (France) Stéphane Pasquier; Trainer: (France) Pascal Bary
- June 17: 2018 Prix de Diane (French Oaks) at (France) Chantilly
  - Horse: (France) Laurens; Jockey: (Republic of Ireland) PJ McDonald; Trainer: (United Kingdom) Karl Burke
- July 14: 2018 Grand Prix de Paris at (France) Longchamp
  - Horse: (France) Shakeel; Jockey: (Belgium) Christophe Soumillon; Trainer: (France) Alain de Royer-Dupré
- October 28: 2018 Prix Royal-Oak (French St Leger) at (France) Chantilly
  - Horse: (France) Holdthasigreen; Jockey: (France) Tony Piccone; Trainer: (France) Bruno Audouin

Other notable races

- July 1: 2018 Grand Prix de Saint-Cloud at (France) Saint-Cloud
  - Horse: (United Kingdom) Waldgeist; Jockey: (France) Pierre-Charles Boudot; Trainer: (France) André Fabre
- October 7: 2018 Prix de l'Arc de Triomphe at (France) Longchamp
  - Horse: (United Kingdom) Enable; Jockey: (Italy) Frankie Dettori; Trainer: (United Kingdom) John Gosden

=== Australia ===
Australian Triple Crown

- March 10: 2018 Randwick Guineas at (Australia) Randwick
  - Horse: (Australia) Kementari; Jockey: (South Africa) Glyn Schofield; Trainer: (Australia) James Cummings
- March 24: 2018 Rosehill Guineas at (Australia) Rosehill
  - Horse: (Australia) D'Argento: Jockey: (Australia) Hugh Bowman; Trainer: (Australia) Chris Waller
- April 7: 2018 Australian Derby at (Australia) Randwick
  - Horse: (Australia) Levendi; Jockey: (Australia) Mark Zahra; Trainer: (Australia) Peter Gelagotis

Other notable races

- April 14: 2018 Queen Elizabeth Stakes at (Australia) Randwick
  - Horse: (Australia) Winx; Jockey: (Australia) Hugh Bowman; Trainer: (Australia) Chris Waller
- October 20: 2018 Caulfield Cup at (Australia) Caulfield
  - Horse: (Republic of Ireland) Best Solution; Jockey: (Northern Ireland) Pat Cosgrave; Trainer: (United Arab Emirates) Saeed bin Suroor
- October 27: 2018 Cox Plate at (Australia) Moonee Valley
  - Horse: (Australia) Winx; Jockey: (Australia) Hugh Bowman; Trainer: (Australia) Chris Waller
- November 6: 2018 Melbourne Cup at (Australia) Flemington
  - Horse: (United Kingdom) Cross Counter; Jockey: (Australia) Kerrin McEvoy; Trainer: (United Kingdom) Charlie Appleby

=== Canada ===
Canadian Triple Crown

- June 30: 2018 Queen's Plate at (Ontario) Woodbine
  - Horse: (Canada) Wonder Gadot; Jockey: (United States) John R. Velazquez; Trainer: (United States) Mark Casse
- July 24: 2018 Prince of Wales Stakes at (Ontario) Fort Erie
  - Horse: (Canada) Wonder Gadot; Jockey: (United States) John R. Velazquez; Trainer: (United States) Mark Casse
- August 18: 2018 Breeders' Stakes at (Ontario) Woodbine
  - Horse: (Canada) Neepawa; Jockey: (France) Jerome Lermyte; Trainer: (United States) Mark Casse

Other notable races

- October 13: 2018 Canadian International Stakes at (Ontario) Woodbine
  - Horse: (Republic of Ireland) Desert Encounter; Jockey: (Italy) Andrea Atzeni; Trainer: (United Kingdom) David Simcock

=== Rest of the world ===
Notable races

- March 31: 2018 Dubai World Cup at (United Arab Emirates) Meydan
  - Horse: (Republic of Ireland) Thunder Snow; Jockey: (Belgium) Christophe Soumillon; Trainer: (United Arab Emirates) Saeed bin Suroor
- March 31: 2018 Dubai Sheema Classic at (United Arab Emirates) Meydan
  - Horse: (United States) Hawkbill; Jockey: (United Kingdom) William Buick; Trainer: (United Kingdom) Charle Appleby
- April 29: 2018 Queen Elizabeth II Cup at (Hong Kong) Sha Tin
  - Horse: (Hong Kong) Pakistan Star; Jockey: (Norway) William Buick; Trainer: (Hong Kong) Anthony S. Cruz
- November 25: 2018 Japan Cup at Tokyo
  - Horse: (Japan) Almond Eye; Jockey: (France) Christophe Lemaire; Trainer: (Japan) Sakae Kunieda
- December 9: 2018 Hong Kong Cup at Sha Tin
  - Horse: (United Kingdom) Glorious Forever; Jockey: (Brazil) Silvestre de Sousa; Trainer: (Hong Kong) Frankie Lor
