= Bucio =

Bucio is a Spanish surname with significant usage in Mexico. Notable people with the surname include:

- Arturo Ramírez Bucio (born 1962), Mexican politician
- Maríano Bucio (born 1942), Mexican equestrian
- Olivia Bucio (born 1954), Mexican actress
