= William Buller =

William Buller may refer to:

- William Buller (bishop) (1735–1796), English Anglican clergyman
- William Buller (racing driver) (born 1992), British racing driver
- William Buller (cricketer)
- Bill Buller (1929–2007), Irish equestrian
