= Gachechiladze =

Gachechiladze (Georgian: გაჩეჩილაძე) is a Georgian surname. Notable people with the surname include:

- Gia Gachechiladze (born 1966), Georgian pop singer, actor, and media personality
- Givi Gachechiladze (born 1938), Georgian composer and conductor
- Levan Gachechiladze (1964–2025), Georgian politician and businessman
- Mikheil Gachechiladze (born 1990), Georgian rugby union player
- Shalva Gachechiladze (born 1987), Georgian show jumping champion
- Tamara Gachechiladze (born 1983), Georgian singer, songwriter, and actress
