= Charles Buller (cricketer, born 1846) =

English cricketer

Personal information
- Full name: Charles Francis Buller
- Born: 26 May 1846; Colombo, Western Province, British Ceylon
- Died: 22 November 1906 (aged 60); Lyme Regis, Dorset, England
- Batting: Right-handed
- Bowling: Right-arm roundarm slow
- Relatives: William Buller (father)

Domestic team information
- Years: Team
- 1865–1877: Marylebone Cricket Club
- 1865–1877: Middlesex

Career statistics
Competition	First-class
Matches	90
Runs scored	3,140
Batting average	21.80
100s/50s	2/12
Top score	106
Balls bowled	428
Wickets	12
Bowling average	31.42
5 wickets in innings	1
10 wickets in match	–
Best bowling	5/?
Catches/stumpings	46/–
- Source: Cricinfo, 3 February 2020

Charles Francis Buller (26 May 1846 – 22 November 1906) was a cricketer who was born in Colombo, Ceylon, but played his cricket for Middlesex and the Marylebone Cricket Club. An alumnus of Harrow School whose father William also played first-class cricket for the MCC, Buller was a right-handed batsman and occasional right-handed round arm bowler. Over his career from 1864 to 1877 he scored 3,140 runs at a batting average of 21.80, with two centuries.
