= Angioni =

Angioni is an Italian surname. Notable people with the surname include:

- Franco Angioni (1933–2025), Italian general and politician
- Giulio Angioni (1939–2017), Italian writer and anthropologist
- Paolo Angioni (1938–2025), Italian equestrian
- Stefano Angioni (born 1939), Italian equestrian
