= Skoczylas =

Skoczylas is a surname. Notable people with the surname include:

- Jan Skoczylas (born 1951), Polish equestrian
- Władysław Skoczylas (1883–1934), Polish artist
- Włodzimierz Skoczylas (1923–1993), Polish actor
