= Harry Meade =

British eventing rider (born 1983)

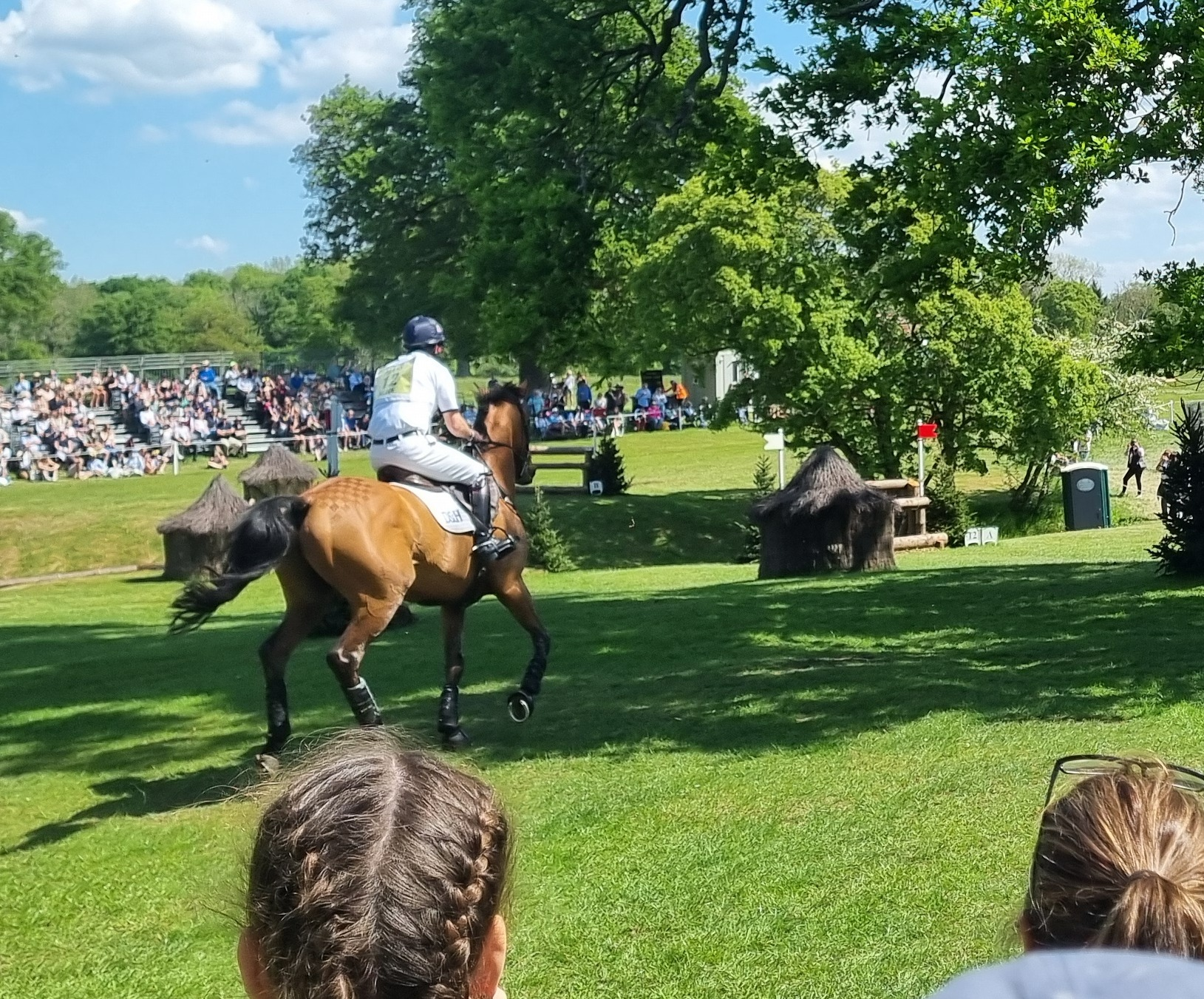
- Harry Meade at the Badminton Horse Trials 2025

Personal information
- Born: 4 July 1983 (age 42)
Medal record
Equestrian
Representing Great Britain
World Championships
Silver medal – second place	2014 Normandy	Team eventing

Harry Meade (born 4 July 1983) is a British eventing rider. In 2004 he was shortlisted for the Young Rider European Championships with the horse Midnight Dazzler. Representing Great Britain, he competed at the 2014 World Equestrian Games in Normandy, France, where he won a team silver medal. At the WEG, Meade and his mount Wild Lone finished the cross country course clear. When his horse was taken to cool down after completing the course, Wild Lone collapsed and died.

Harry is a son of Richard Meade, multiple Olympic gold medalist in eventing.

== Accidents and recovery ==
Meade has come back to compete after serious injury several times. In 2013, he shattered both elbows in a rotational fall at the Wellington Horse Trials, after which he thought he would never be able to compete again. In 2020, he broke his arm and suffered several serious injuries after falling at fence 3 in the CCI3* at the Thoresbury Park International. In the fall, his foot became caught in the stirrup and he was dragged at a gallop, where he was kicked repeatedly in the head before his foot was dislodged. He was later found to have suffered benign paroxysmal positional vertigo from the accident and underwent rehabilitation.

After recovery, he returned to competition. In 2025, he was FEI Eventing world number 1.
