= Murphy Himself =

Show horse

- Breed: Irish Sport Horse
- Sire: Royal Renown (Thoroughbred)
- Grandsire: Gustav (Thoroughbred)
- Dam: Molly (Irish Sport Horse)
- Maternal grandsire: Cappagh Boy (Thoroughbred)
- Sex: 16.3 hh (170 cm) Gelding
- Foaled: 1978 in Ireland
- Colour: Grey
- Breeder: John (Jack) Higgins
- Owner: Ian Stark, Virginia "Ginny" Leng
- Trainer: Ian Stark, Ginny Leng

Murphy Himself
Medal record

Equestrian

World Championships
Silver medal – second place	1990 Stockholm	Individual eventing
Silver medal – second place	1990 Stockholm	Team eventing

Murphy Himself was a horse that excelled in the sport of eventing, primarily under rider Ian Stark.

Born in 1978, Murphy Himself was first ridden by Virginia "Ginny" Leng. She bought him in Northern Ireland in 1981 or 1982 for eventing. Under Leng, Murphy won both Le Touquet and Burghley.

Leng had difficulty controlling the horse. Stark tried him out in 1988, and he agreed to exchange horses with Leng, Murphy Himself for his own horse Griffin. Stark and Murphy experienced great success together, completing Badminton several times, receiving the silver medal at the 1990 FEI World Equestrian Games in Stockholm representing the British Team, and competing in the Barcelona Olympics.

After the ground jury did not pass Murphy in the final horse inspection at Barcelona, the gelding was retired. He was fox hunted a few times, before he was put down due to a shattered hock from an injury in the pasture.

== Achievements ==
- 1st at Avenches (1984) with Ginny Leng
- 1st at 1986 Le Touquet CCI with Ginny Leng
- 1st at 1986 Burghley with Ginny Leng
- 1st at the 1988 Boekelo event
- Individual and Team silver at the Stockholm World Equestrian Games in 1990
- 2nd place at the Badminton Horse Trials in 1991
- Member of the British Eventing Team at the 1992 Barcelona Olympics
