= Barry Roycroft =

Australian equestrian competitor, administrator, and coach

Personal information
- Full name: Barry Thomas Roycroft
- Nationality: Australian
- Born: 25 May 1944 (age 82)

Sport
- Sport: Equestrian
Medal record
Equestrian
Representing Australia
World Championships
| Bronze medal – third place | 1986 Gawler | Team eventing |

Barry Thomas Roycroft, AM (born 25 May 1944) is an Australian equestrian competitor, administrator, and coach.

Roycroft is the eldest son of Bill Roycroft, an Olympic equestrian gold medallist, and his wife, Mavis; his younger brothers, Wayne and Clarke, also competed in the Olympics. He was the reserve rider in Australia's first show jumping team at the 1964 Tokyo Games. He was selected for the 1972 Munich Olympics, but injury to another horse in his team meant that he could not compete. He competed at the 1976 Montreal Olympics in showjumping and the 1988 Seoul Olympics in eventing.

He began elite coaching in equestrian in 1983 and judging competitions in 1985, and has served on several committees relating to the sport. He set up an equestrian exchange program with Japan and founded the Lakes & Craters International Horse Trials in his home town of Camperdown in 1978. He is married to Lynne, who has also refereed equestrian events, and they have three children.

He received an Australian Sports Medal in 2000. At the 2016 Australia Day Honours he was made a Member of the Order of Australia for "significant service to equestrian sports, as an administrator, coach and competitor"; later that year he was inducted into the Equestrian Australia Hall of Fame.
