= World Eventing Championships =

Equestrian competition

The World Eventing Championships, or the eventing competition in the World Equestrian Games (WEG), began in 1966. It includes both a team and individual competition for the best horses and riders in the sport of eventing. The World Championship is held every four years, and is held at the CCI**** level, the second highest level of eventing competition.

== Past winners ==
=== Individual results ===
Individual medalists
Year	Location	Gold	Silver	Bronze
1966	(United Kingdom) Burghley	(Argentina) Carlos Moratorio on Chalan	(United Kingdom) Richard Meade on Barberry	(Republic of Ireland) Virginia Freeman-Jackson on Sam Weller
1970	(Republic of Ireland) Punchestown	(United Kingdom) Mary Gordon-Watson on Cornishman	(United Kingdom) Richard Meade on The Poacher	(United States) James Wofford on Kilkenny
1974	(United Kingdom) Burghley	(United States) Bruce Davidson on Irish Cap	(United States) Michael Plumb on Good Mixture	(United Kingdom) Hugh Thomas on Playamar
1978	(United States) Lexington	(United States) Bruce Davidson on Might Tango	(Republic of Ireland) John Watson on Cambridge Blue	(West Germany) Helmut Rethemeier on Ladalco
1982	(West Germany) Luhmühlen	(United Kingdom) Lucinda Green on Regal Realm	(West Germany) Helmut Rethemeier on Santiago	(United States) Kim Walnes on The Gray Goose
1986	(Australia) Gawler	(United Kingdom) Virginia Leng on Priceless	(New Zealand) Trudy Boyce on Mossman	(United Kingdom) Lorna Clarke on Myross
1990	(Sweden) Stockholm	(New Zealand) Blyth Tait on Messiah	(United Kingdom) Ian Stark on Murphy Himself	(United States) Bruce Davidson on Pirate Lion
1994	(Netherlands) The Hague	(New Zealand) Vaughn Jefferis on Bounce	(United States) Dorothy Trapp on Molokai	(United Kingdom) Karen Dixon on Get Smart
1998	(Italy) Rome	(New Zealand) Blyth Tait on Ready Teddy	(New Zealand) Mark Todd on Broadcast News	(Sweden) Paula Törnqvist on Monaghan
2002	(Spain) Jerez	(France) Jean Teulère on Espoir de la Mare	(United Kingdom) Jeanette Brakewell on Over To You	(Finland) Piia Pantsu on Ypäjä Karuso
2006	(Germany) Aachen	(United Kingdom) Zara Phillips on Toytown	(Australia) Clayton Fredericks on Ben Along Time	(United States) Amy Tryon on Poggio
2010	(United States) Lexington	(Germany) Michael Jung on La Biosthetique - Sam	(United Kingdom) William Fox-Pitt on Cool Mountain	(New Zealand) Andrew Nicholson on Nereo
2014	(France) Normandy	(Germany) Sandra Auffarth on Opgun Louvo	(Germany) Michael Jung on Fischerrocana	(United Kingdom) William Fox-Pitt on Chilli Morning
2018	(United States) Tryon	(United Kingdom) Rosalind Canter on Allstar B	(Republic of Ireland) Padraig McCarthy on Mr Chunky	(Germany) Ingrid Klimke on SAP Hale-Bob OLD
2022	(Italy) Pratoni del Vivaro	(United Kingdom) Yasmin Ingham on Banzai du Loir	(Germany) Julia Krajewski on Amande de B'Neville	(New Zealand) Tim Price on Falco
2026	(Germany) Aachen	(Germany) Michael Jung on fischerChipmunk FRH	(United Kingdom) Rosalind Canter on Lordships Graffalo	(United Kingdom) Laura Collett on London 52

=== Team results ===
Team medalists
Year	Location	Gold	Silver	Bronze
1966	(United Kingdom) Burghley	Ireland; Virginia Freeman-Jackson on Sam Weller; Eddie Boylan on Durlas Eile; Penelope Moreton on Loughlin; Thomas Brennan on Kilkenny	Argentina; Carlos Moratorio on Chalan; Roberto Pistarini on Desidia; Ludovico Fusco on Gatopardo; Enrique Sztyrle on Hijo Manso	not awarded
1970	(Republic of Ireland) Punchestown	Great Britain; Mary Gordon-Watson on Cornishman V Richard Meade on The Poacher; Mark Phillips on Chicago; Stuart Stevens on Benson	France; Michel Cochenet on Quaker; Dominique Bentejac on Trou Normand; Dominique Flament on Qui Dit Mieux; Henri Michel on Duragan	not awarded
1974	(United Kingdom) Burghley	United States; Bruce Davidson on Irish Cap; Michael Plumb on Good Mixture; Edward Emerson on Viktor; Don Sachey on Plain Sailing	Great Britain; Richard Meade on Wayfarer; Bridget Parker on Cornish Gold; Christopher Collins on Smokey; Mark Phillips on Columbus	West Germany; Martin Plewa on Virginia; Herbert Blöcker on Albrant; Horst Karsten on Sioux; Kurt Mergler on Vaibel
1978	(United States) Lexington	Canada; Mark Ishoy on Law and Order; Juliet Bishop on Sumatra; Elizabeth Ashton on Sunrise; Cathy Wedge on Abracadabra	West Germany; Helmut Rethemeier on Ladalco; Otto Ammermann on Volturno; Harry Klugmann on Veberod; Herbert Blöcker on Albrant	United States; Bruce Davidson on Might Tango; James Wofford on Carawich; Edmund Coffin on Bally Cor; Michael Plumb on Laurenson
1982	(West Germany) Luhmühlen	Great Britain; Lucinda Green on Regal Realm; Richard Meade on Kilcashel; Virginia Holgate on Priceless; Rachel Bayliss on Mystic Mistrel	West Germany; Helmut Rethemeier on Ladad; Rüdiger Schwarz on Power Game; Herbert Blöcker on Santiago; Dietmar Hogrefe on Foliant	United States; Kim Walnes on The Grey Goose; Nancy Bliss on Cobblestone; Torrance Fleischmann on Southern Comfort III; Michael Plumb on Blue Stone
1986	(Australia) Gawler	Great Britain; Virginia Leng on Priceless; Lorna Clarke on Myross; Ian Stark on Oxford Blue; Clarissa Strachan on Delphy Dazzle	France; Marie-Christine Duroy on Harley; Armand Bigot on Jacquou du Bois; Thierry Touzaint on Gardenia III; Vincent Berthet on Jupille	Australia; Barry Roycroft on Last Tango; Scott Keach on Trade Commissioner; Wayne Roycroft on Valdez; Andrew Hoy on Just James
1990	(Sweden) Stockholm	New Zealand; Andrew Nicholson on Spinning Rhombus; Andrew Scott on Umptee; Blyth Tait on Messiah; Mark Todd on Bahlua	Great Britain; Karen Straker on Get Smart; Rodney Powell on The Irishman II; Virginia Leng on Griffin; Ian Stark on Murphy Himself	Germany; Edith Beine on Kyang; Matthias Baumann on Alabaster; Marina Loheit on Sundance Kid; Herbert Blöcker on Feine Dame
1994	(Netherlands) The Hague	Great Britain; Karen Dixon on Get Smart; Mary Thomson on King William; Charlotte Bathe on The Cool Customer; Kristina Gifford on General Jock	France; Jean-Lou Bigot on Twist la Beige; Jean Teulere on Rodosto; Marie-Christine Duroy on Summer Song	Germany; Bettina Overesch on Watermill Stream; Cord Mysegaes on Ricardo; Ralf Ehrenbrink on Kildare
1998	(Italy) Rome	New Zealand; Blyth Tait on Ready Teddy; Mark Todd on Broadcast News; Vaughn Jefferis on Bounce; Sally Clark on Squirrel Hill	France; Marie-Christine Duroy on Summer Song; Rodolphe Scherer on Bambi de Brière; Jean-Lou Bigot on Twist la Beige; Philippe Mull on Viens du Frêne	Great Britain; Polly Phillipps on Coral Cover; Gary Parsonage on Magic Rogue; Nigel Taylor on The Frenchmann II; Karen Dixon on Too Smart
2002	(Spain) Jerez	United States; John Williams on Carrick; Kimberly Vinoski on Winsome Adante; David O'Connor on Giltedge; Amy Tryon on Poggio II	France; Cédric Lyard on Fine Merveille; Jean Teulère on Espoir de la Mare; Jean-Luc Force on Crocus Jacob; Didier Courrèges on Free Style	Great Britain; Jeanette Brakewell on Over To You; Pippa Funnell on Supreme Rock; William Fox-Pitt on Tamarillo; Leslie Law on Shear H2O
2006	(Germany) Aachen	Germany; Frank Ostholt on Air Jordan; Hinrich Romeike on Marius; Bettina Hoy on Ringwood Cockatoo; Ingrid Klimke on Sleep Late	Great Britain; Zara Phillips on Toytown; Daisy Dick on Spring Along; William Fox-Pitt on Tamarillo; Mary King on Call Again Cavalier	Australia; Clayton Fredericks on Ben Along Time; Megan Jones on Kirby Park Irish Jester; Andrew Hoy on Master Monarch; Sonja Johnson on Ringwood Jaguar
2010	(United States) Lexington	Great Britain; William Fox-Pitt on Cool Mountain; Mary King on Imperial Cavalier; Nicola Wilson on Opposition Buzz; Kristina Cook on Miners Frolic	Canada; Stephanie Rhodes-Bosch on Port Authority; Selena O'Hanlon on Colombo; Hawley Bennett-Awad on Gin & Juice; Kyle Carter on Madison Park	New Zealand; Andrew Nicholson on Nereo; Mark Todd on Grass Valley; Caroline Powell on Mac Macdonald; Clarke Johnstone on Orient Express
2014	(France) Normandy	Germany; Sandra Auffarth on Opgun Louvo; Michael Jung on Rocana; Ingrid Klimke on Escada; Dirk Schrade on Hop and Skip	Great Britain; William Fox-Pitt on Chilli Morning; Zara Phillips on High Kingdom; Kristina Cook on De Novo News; Harry Meade on Wild Lone	Netherlands; Elaine Pen on Vira; Tim Lips on Keyflow; Merel Blom on Rumour Has It; Andrew Heffernan on Boleybawn Ace
2018	(United States) Tryon	Great Britain; Rosalind Canter on Allstar B Piggy French on Quarrycrest Echo; Tom McEwen on Toledo de Kerser; Gemma Tattersall on Arctic Soul	Ireland; Padraig McCarthy on Mr Chunky; Sarah Ennis on Stellor Rebound; Sam Watson on Ardagh Highlight; Cathal Daniels on Rioghan Rua	France; Thibaut Vallette on Qing du Briot; Maxime Livio on Opium de Verrieres; Sidney Dufresne on Tresor Mail; Donatien Schauly on Pivoine des Touches
2022	(Italy) Pratoni del Vivaro	Germany; Julia Krajewski on Amande de B'Neville; Michael Jung on Chipmunk FRH; Christoph Wahler on Carjatan S Sandra Auffarth on Viamant du Matz	United States; William Coleman on Off The Record; Tamie Smith on Mai Baum; Lauren Nicholson on Vermiculus; Boyd Martin on Tsetserleg TSF	New Zealand; Tim Price on Falco; Jonelle Price on McClaren; Monica Spencer on Artist; Clarke Johnstone on Menlo Park
2026	(Germany) Aachen	Great Britain; Rosalind Canter on Lordships Graffalo; Laura Collett on London 52; Tom McEwen on JL Dublin; Gemma Stevens on Flash Cooley	Germany; Libussa Lubbeke on Caramia FRH; Michael Jung on fischer Chipmunk FRH; Malin Hansen-Hotopp on Carlitos Quidditch K S Julia Krajewski on Uelzener's Nickel	United States; William Coleman on Diablo; Caroline Pamukcu on HSH Blake; Boyd Martin on Cooley Nutcracker; Phillip Dutton on Denim

== Medal count ==
The current historical medal count since 1966 up to 2022 is as follows:

Rank	Nation	Gold	Silver	Bronze	Total
1	Great Britain	12	9	6	27
2	Germany	5	5	5	15
3	New Zealand	5	2	4	11
4	United States	4	3	6	13
5	France	1	5	1	7
6	Ireland	1	3	1	5
7	Argentina	1	1	0	2
7	Canada	1	1	0	2
9	Australia	0	1	2	3
10	Finland	0	0	1	1
10	Netherlands	0	0	1	1
10	Sweden	0	0	1	1
Totals (12 entries)		30	30	28	88

- Note 1: Medal count is sorted by total gold medals, then total silver medals, then total bronze medals, then alphabetically.
- Note 2: Germany includes both Germany and West Germany.

== Incidents ==
- 2010: Four horses and six riders fell during the cross-country portion of the event. Inonothing, ridden by Paul Tapner (AUS) fractured his left hind patella in a fall. Iman de Golfe, ridden by Juan Carlos Garcia (Italy) was hospitalized after he fell and suffered a deep laceration.
- 2014: Maxime Livio (FRA) was disqualified from the eventing competition when her mount Qalao des Mers was found to be positive for a banned substance, Hydroxyethylpromazine sulfoxide. Their positive result resulted in the disqualification of the entire French eventing team from participation, subsequently preventing their participation at the 2016 Rio Olympic Games.
- 2018: Box Qutie ridden by Anna Freskgård (SWE) was euthanized after becoming injured while participating in cross-country.
