= Karen Straker =

British equestrian

Personal information
- Born: 17 September 1964 (age 61) County Durham, England
Medal record
Equestrian
Representing Great Britain
Olympic Games
Silver medal – second place	1988 Seoul	Team eventing
World Championships
Gold medal – first place	1994 Den Haag	Team eventing
Silver medal – second place	1990 Stockholm	Team eventing
Bronze medal – third place	1994 Den Haag	Individual eventing
Bronze medal – third place	1998 Rome	Team eventing
European Championships
Gold medal – first place	1991 Punchestown	Team eventing
Bronze medal – third place	1991 Punchestown	Individual eventing

Karen Dixon MBE (née Straker; born 17 September 1964) is a British equestrian. She was born in County Durham, England. She is a four time Olympian and won a silver medal in team eventing at the 1988 Olympic Games in Seoul.

== Career ==
Straker also competed at the 1992, 1996 and 2000 Olympics. She won World Team Silver in 1990 and World Team Gold in 1994. In addition to this she has taken two individual bronze medals at the Europeans in 1991 and at the Worlds in 1994. Her two most famous former top horses have been "Get Smart" and "Too Smart". She has had five top ten Badminton Horse Trials placings, coming 5th in 1988, 6th in 1989, 9th in 1990, and 10th in 1991 and 1994.

She was appointed MBE in the 1996 New Year Honours.
