= Bill McLernon =

Irish equestrian (born 1934)

Personal information
- Full name: William McLernon
- Nationality: Irish
- Born: 1 August 1934 (age 91) Glenbrook, County Cork, Ireland

Sport
- Sport: Equestrian
Medal record
Equestrian
Representing Ireland
European Championships
Bronze medal – third place	1971 Burghley	Team eventing

William McLernon (born 1 August 1934) is an Irish equestrian. He competed in two events at the 1972 Summer Olympics. McLernon was born in Glenbrook, County Cork on 1 August 1934.
