= Maarten Jurgens =

Dutch equestrian

Personal information
- Nationality: Dutch
- Born: 18 August 1944 (age 80); Nijmegen, Netherlands

Sport
- Sport: Equestrian

Maarten Jurgens (born 18 August 1944) is a Dutch equestrian. He competed in two events at the 1972 Summer Olympics.
