= Paul Hürlimann =

Swiss equestrian

Personal information
- Nationality: Swiss
- Born: 21 November 1933; Wädenswil, Switzerland
- Died: 1 March 2012 (aged 78); Aarau, Switzerland

Sport
- Sport: Equestrian

Paul Hürlimann (21 November 1933 – 1 March 2012) was a Swiss equestrian. He competed in two events at the 1972 Summer Olympics.
