= Wolf-Dieter Rihs =

Austrian equestrian

Personal information
- Nationality: Austrian
- Born: 30 March 1950 (age 74)

Sport
- Sport: Equestrian

Wolf-Dieter Rihs (born 30 March 1950) is an Austrian equestrian. He competed in two events at the 1972 Summer Olympics.
