= Boris Stefanov (equestrian) =

Bulgarian equestrian

Personal information
- Nationality: Bulgarian
- Born: 6 May 1946 (age 79); Targovishte, Bulgaria

Sport
- Sport: Equestrian

Boris Stefanov (Bulgarian: Борис Стефанов; born 6 May 1946) is a Bulgarian equestrian. He competed in two events at the 1972 Summer Olympics.
