= Wendy Dell =

Canadian equestrian

Wendy (Irving) Dell
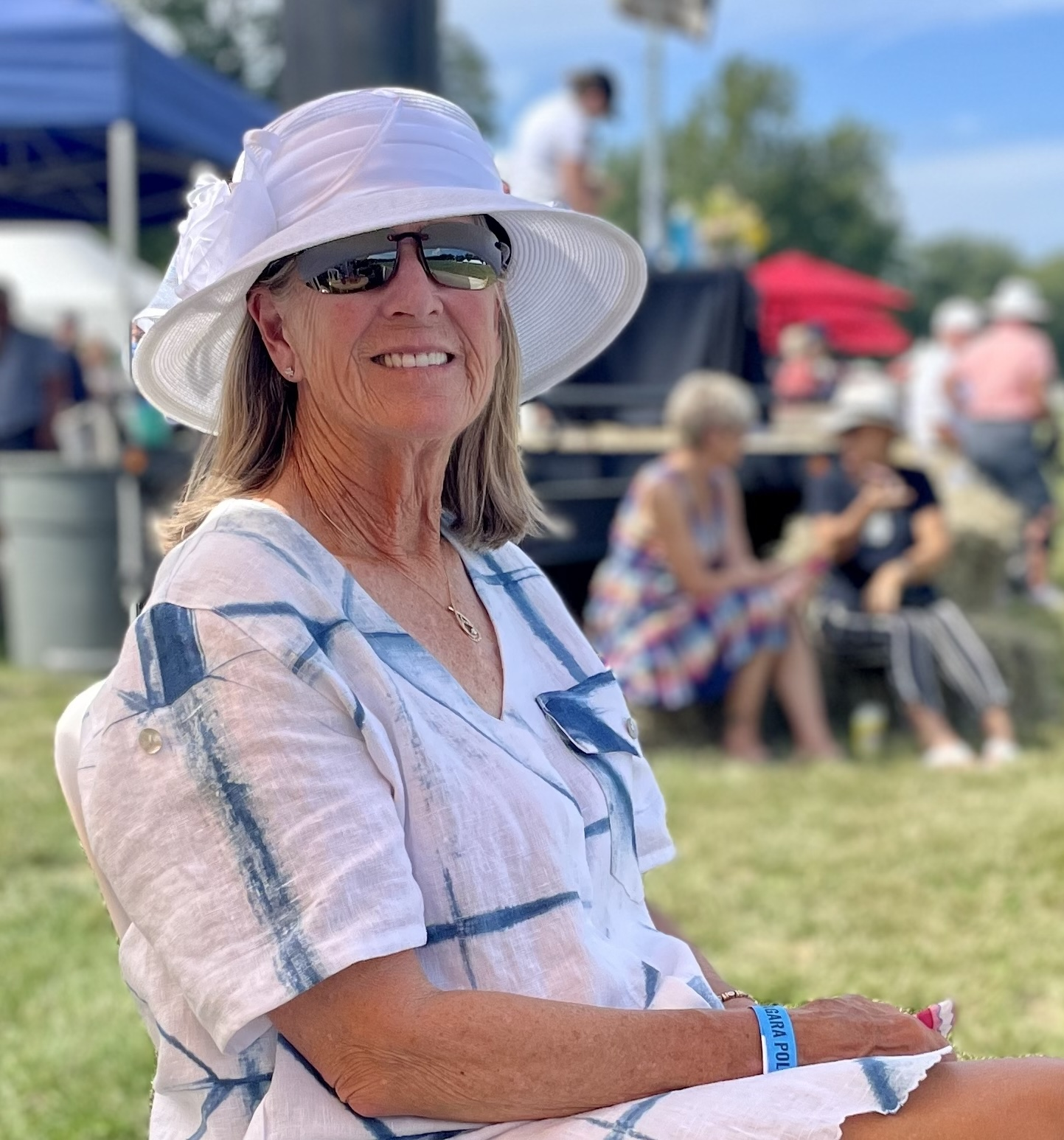
- Dell at Niagara Polo on 10 September 2022, in Niagara on the Lake, Ontario, Canada.

Personal information
- Born: Wendy Irving; 11 November 1951 (age 74) Ottawa, Ontario, Canada
- Spouse: George Dell
- Children: 3

Sport
- Sport: Equestrian
Medal record
Equestrian
Representing Canada
Pan American Games
Gold medal – first place	1971 Cali	Team eventing

Wendy Dell (née Irving; born 11 November 1951) is a Canadian equestrian. She competed in the three-day event at the 1972 Summer Olympics.

Dell is a Canadian equestrian who gained prominence as the first woman to represent Canada in the Olympic three-day event at the 1972 Munich Olympic Games. Born in Hull, Quebec, Canada, she has made contributions to the sport both as a competitor and in various capacities post-competition.

== Early life and career ==
Dell's equestrian career began in her youth, leading to a gold medal win at the 1971 Pan American Games in Cali, Colombia when she was only nineteen years of age.

The cross-country course at Cali was challenging, resulting in the elimination of all teams except Canada. Despite being the only team to finish, the Canadians had every reason to be proud of their achievement in winning the Team Gold Medal.

The equestrian community was initially shocked and amused when Canada entered three 20-year-olds, including two women, into the Three-Day Event, competing mainly against male cavalry officers and disbelieving South Americans. However, the skeptics were silenced when Wendy Irving from Hull, Quebec, secured a gold medal for the team with a flawless ride on High Wind.

After her victories in Cali, Wendy began training for the 1972 Munich Olympics with Mr. Herbert and the team at the Eglinton Equestrian Club, participating in numerous Ontario events. Following the final pre-Olympic Trials at Jokers Hill, she departed with the team for Munich.

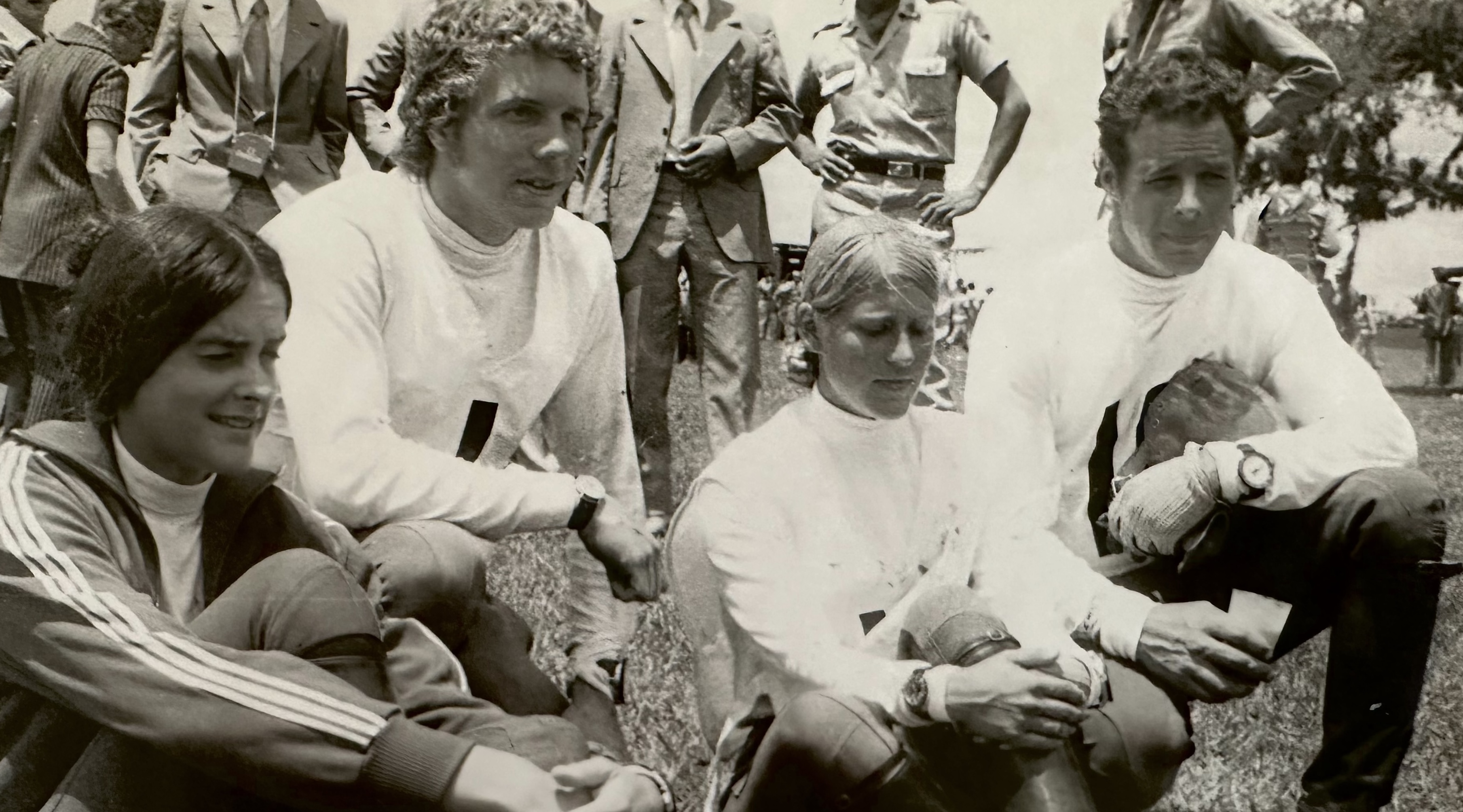
Team representing Canada for the 3-Day Event at the 1971 Pan American Games (left to right) Cathy Wedge, Clint Banbury, Wendy Irving, Robyn Hann

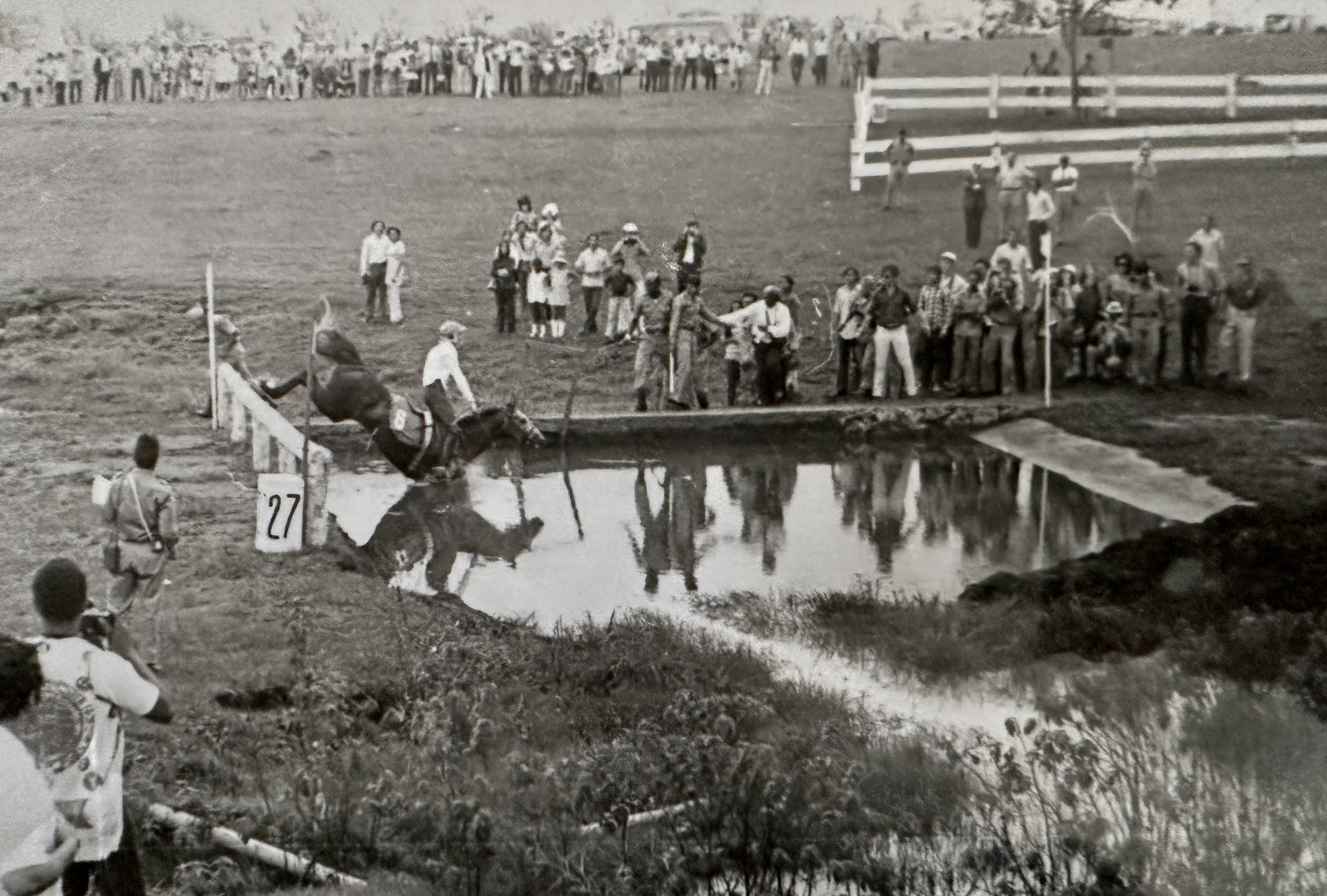
Wendy Dell and High Wind at a water cross-country obstacle at the 1971 Pan American Games in Cali Colombia

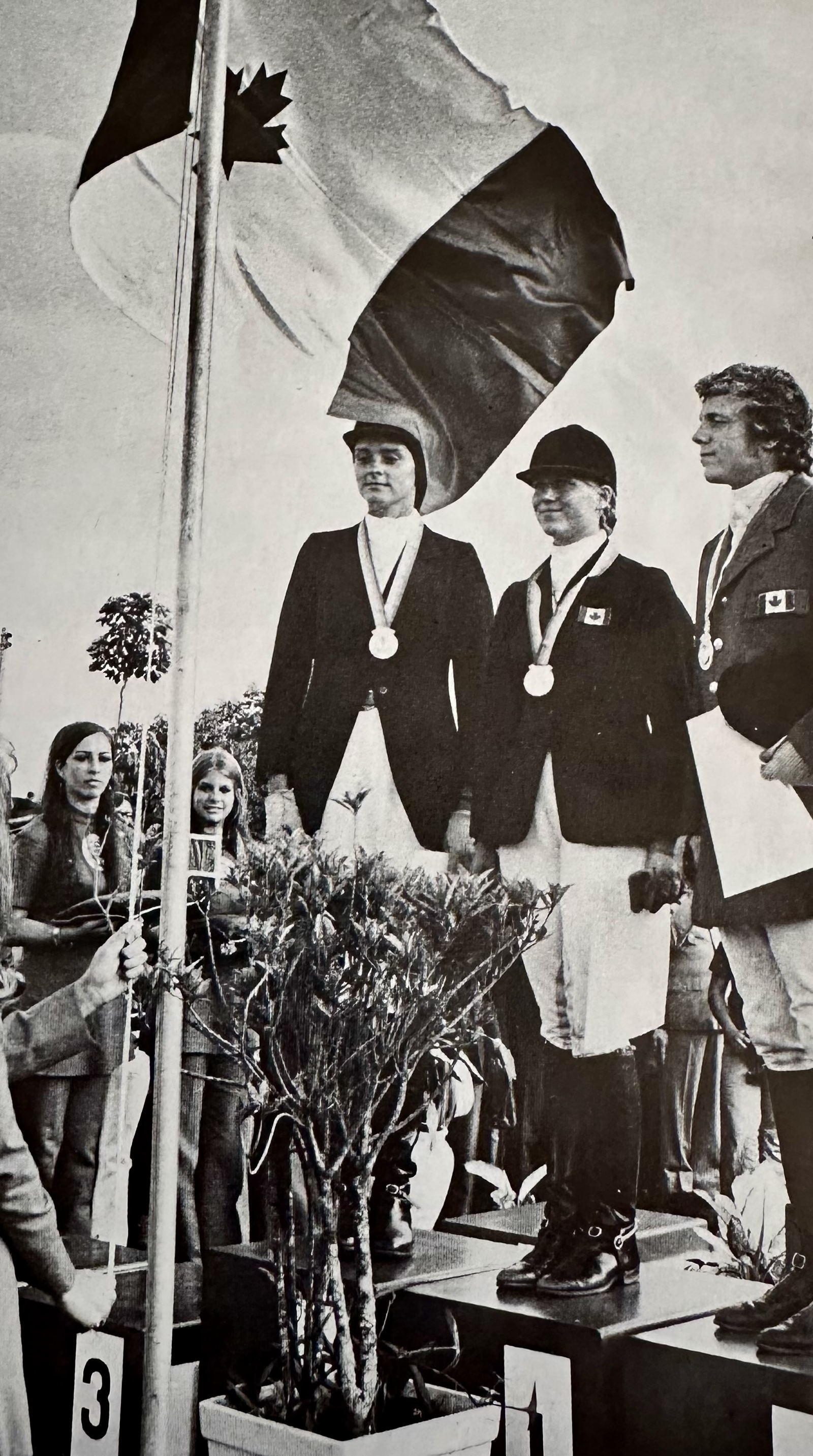
3-Day Event - Team Gold Medal at the Pan American Games in Cali, Colombia (left to right): Cathy Wedge, Wendy Irving, Clint Banbury

== Olympic breakthrough ==
At the 1972 Munich Olympic Games, Dell became the first woman to represent Canada in the Olympic three-day event.

Among the male dominated 73 competitors, Dell, 20 at the time, was the youngest of the only three women to compete among the 19 countries entered. She was one of the only 48 riders to complete the competition (as were the other two women). Nearly a third of the competitors were unable to finish what was known as one of the most difficult cross-country courses in Olympic history - with four fences alone producing 38 refusals, 18 falls and 7 eliminations. The cross-country phase also included the old eventing format with steeplechase and two roads and tracks components – which was over thirty miles long.

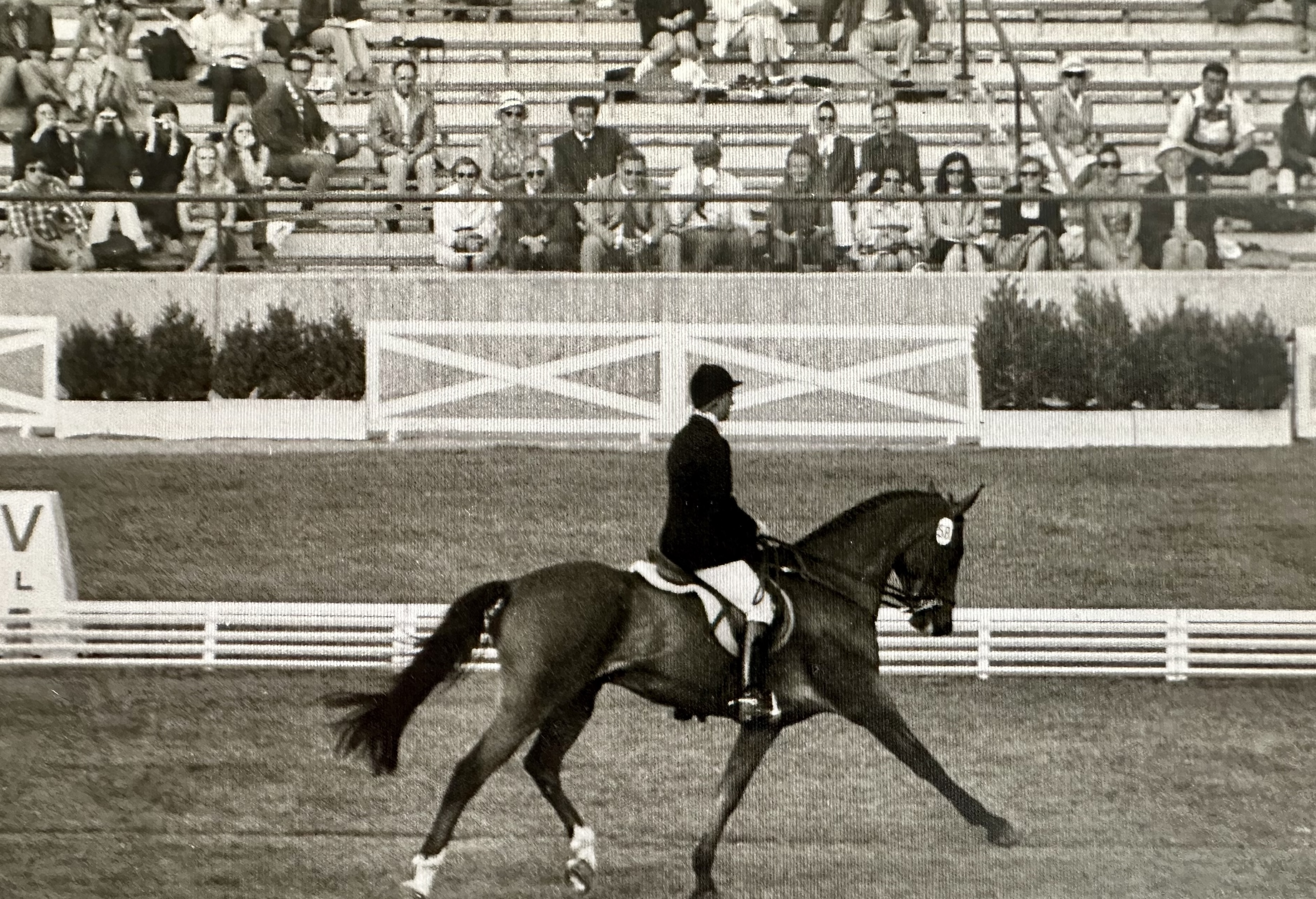
Wendy Dell and High Wind performing at the dressage phase, representing Canada at the 1972 Olympic Games in Munich Germany

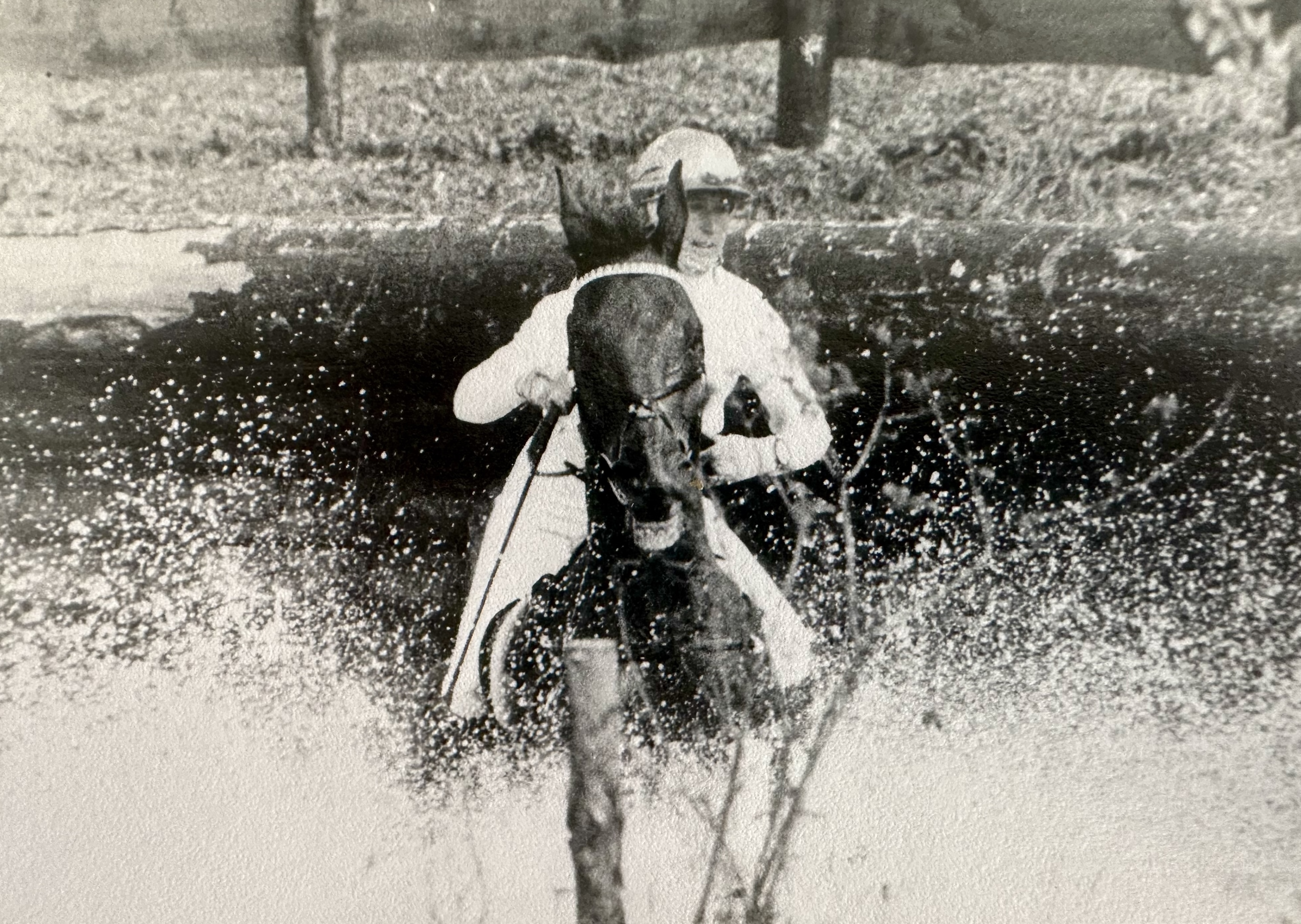
Wendy Dell riding High Wind at the water obstacle, representing Canada at the 1972 Olympic Games in Munich Germany

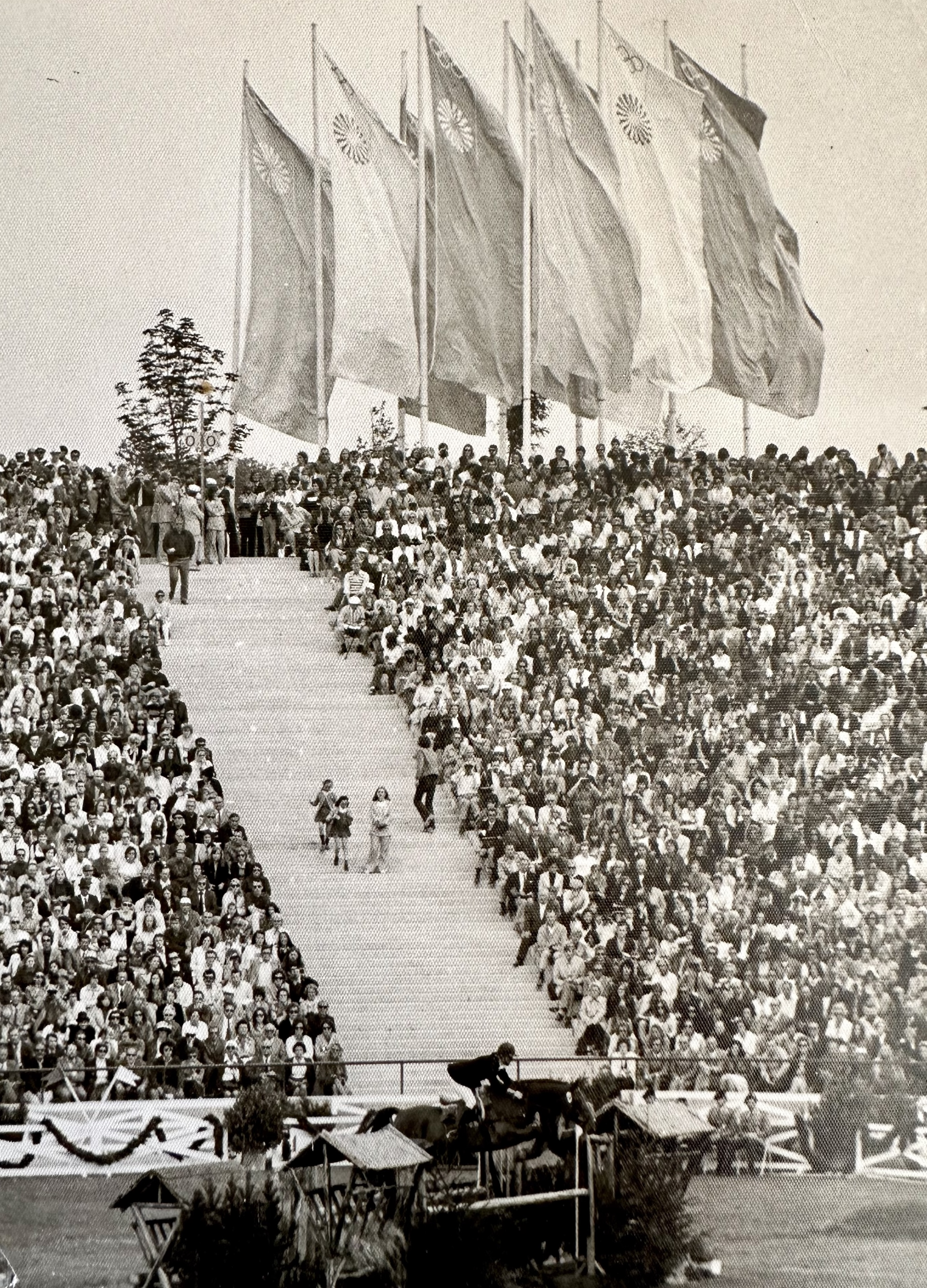
Wendy Dell and High Wind jumping in the stadium phase, representing Canada for the 3-Day Event at the 1972 Olympics in Munich Germany

== Post-competitive contributions ==
After retiring from competitive riding, Dell served as the chair of the Canadian Eventing High Performance Committee.

== Legacy and family ==
Dell's contributions to Canadian equestrian have had a lasting impact. Her husband, George Dell, played a key role in organizing the first Niagara Polo charity event in Niagara on the Lake.

== See also ==
- Equestrian events at the 1972 Summer Olympics
