= Rudolf Beerbohm =

German equestrian

Personal information
- Nationality: German
- Born: 3 November 1941; Süderholz, Germany
- Died: 1 June 2018 (aged 76)

Sport
- Sport: Equestrian

Rudolf Beerbohm (3 November 1941 – 1 June 2018) was a German equestrian. He competed in two events at the 1972 Summer Olympics.
