= Gerardo Jáuregui =

Argentine equestrian

Personal information
- Nationality: Argentine
- Born: 25 May 1942
- Died: 22 October 2020 (aged 78)

Sport
- Sport: Equestrian

Gerardo Jáuregui (25 May 1942 – 22 October 2020) was an Argentine equestrian. He competed in two events at the 1972 Summer Olympics.
