= Mamadzhan Ismailov =

Soviet equestrian

Personal information
- Nationality: Soviet
- Born: 27 July 1936; Tashkent, Uzbekistan
- Died: 7 November 1993 (aged 57)

Sport
- Sport: Equestrian

Mamadzhan Ismailov (27 July 1936 – 7 November 1993) was a Soviet equestrian. He competed in two events at the 1972 Summer Olympics.
