= Ferdinand Croy =

Austrian equestrian (born 1940)

Personal information
- Nationality: Austrian
- Born: 23 June 1940
- Died: 26 February 2026 (age 85)

Sport
- Sport: Equestrian

Ferdinand Croy (born 23 June 1940 - died 26 February 2026) was an Austrian equestrian. He competed in two events at the 1972 Summer Olympics. He died on 26 February 2026 age 85.
