= Madeleine Witte-Vrees =

Dutch equestrian

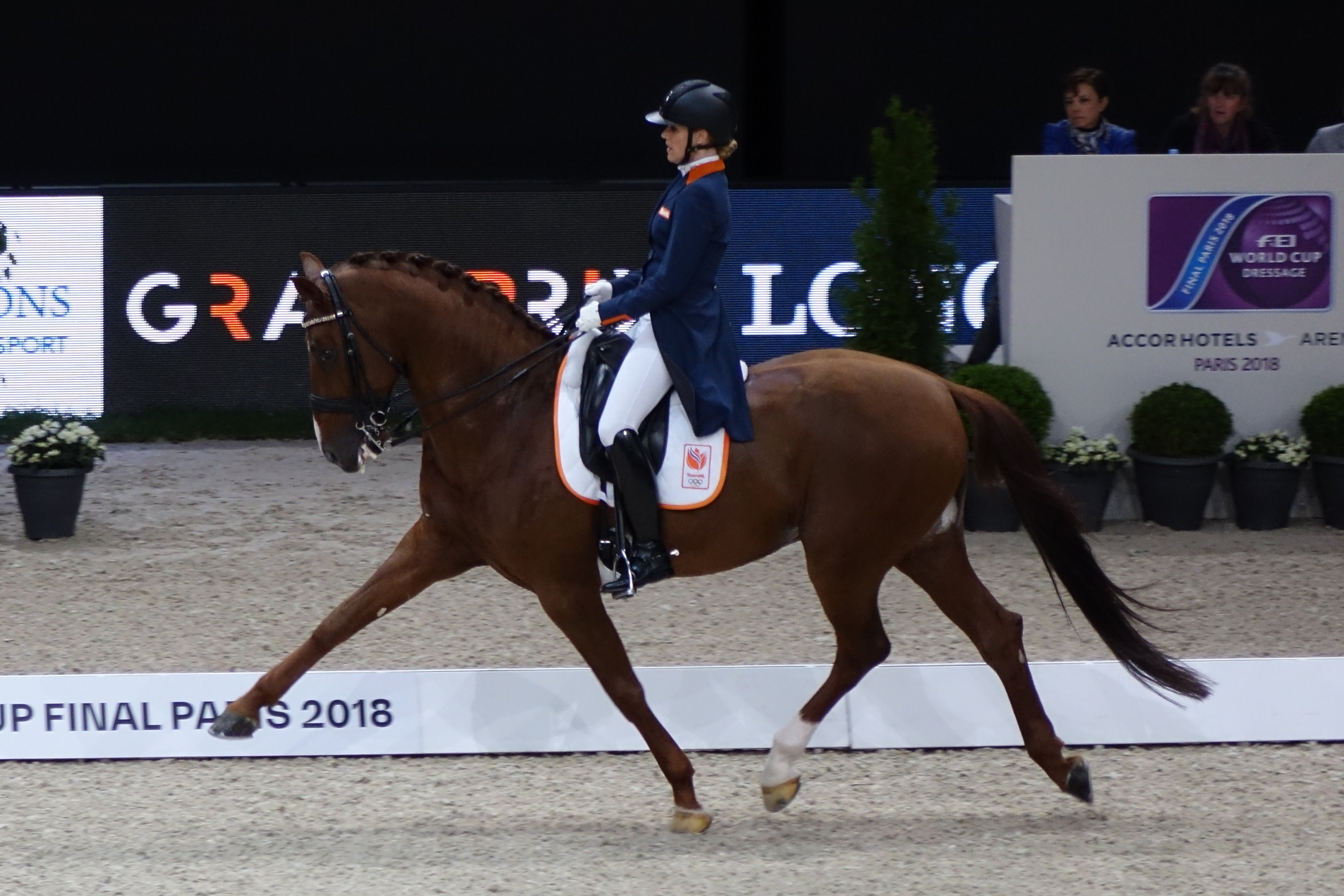
- Madeleine Witte-Vrees in 2018

Personal information
- Full name: Madeleine Witte-Vrees
- Born: Madeleine Vrees; Apr 25, 1972 (age 54) Schijndel, Netherlands

Sport
- Country: Netherlands
- Sport: Equestrian
- Coached by: Nicole Werner

Achievements and titles
- World finals: 2018 FEI World Equestrian Games

Madeleine Witte-Vrees (born 25 April 1972, Schijndel) is a Dutch equestrian athlete. She competed at the 2018 FEI World Equestrian Games and at the 2017 European Championships in Gothenburg. She was also the reserve rider for the Olympic Games in 2016 with her horse Cennin. In 2012 she was seen as one of the potential candidates to represent the Netherlands at the Olympic Games in London, but her top horse Vontango B suddenly died from colic.
