= Yordan Ivanov (equestrian) =

Bulgarian equestrian

Personal information
- Nationality: Bulgarian
- Born: 22 March 1932 (age 93); Maritsa, Bulgaria

Sport
- Sport: Equestrian

Yordan Ivanov (Bulgarian: Йордан Иванов; born 22 March 1932) is a Bulgarian equestrian. He competed in two events at the 1972 Summer Olympics.
