= Helmut Gille =

German equestrian

Personal information
- Nationality: German
- Born: 23 April 1939 (age 85); Salzwedel, Germany

Sport
- Sport: Equestrian

Helmut Gille (born 23 April 1939) is a German equestrian. He competed in two events at the 1972 Summer Olympics.
