= Alejandro Guglielmi =

Argentine equestrian

Personal information
- Nationality: Argentine
- Born: 3 May 1936 (age 88)

Sport
- Sport: Equestrian

Alejandro Guglielmi (born 3 May 1936) is an Argentine equestrian. He competed in two events at the 1972 Summer Olympics.
