= Gocho Milev =

Bulgarian equestrian

Personal information
- Nationality: Bulgarian
- Born: 20 October 1944 (age 80); Dobrichka, Bulgaria

Sport
- Sport: Equestrian

Gocho Milev (Bulgarian: Гочо Милев; born 20 October 1944) is a Bulgarian equestrian. He competed in two events at the 1972 Summer Olympics.
