= Piet van der Schans =

Dutch equestrian

Personal information
- Nationality: Dutch
- Born: 23 June 1934; Sprang-Capelle, Netherlands
- Died: 23 April 2003 (aged 68); Vilaros, Spain

Sport
- Sport: Equestrian

Piet van der Schans (23 June 1934 – 23 April 2003) was a Dutch equestrian. He competed in two events at the 1972 Summer Olympics.
