= Hans Brugman =

Dutch equestrian

Personal information
- Nationality: Dutch
- Born: 10 January 1945 (age 80); Glasgow, Scotland

Sport
- Sport: Equestrian

Hans Brugman (born 10 January 1945) is a Dutch equestrian. He competed in two events at the 1972 Summer Olympics.
