= Wojciech Mickunas =

Polish equestrian

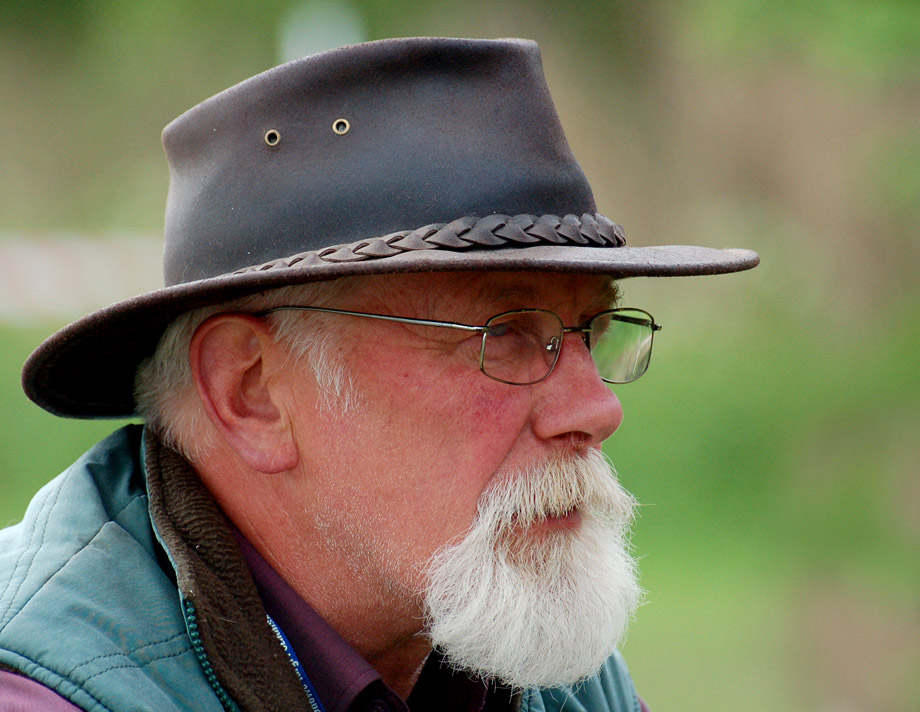
- Wojciech Mickunas in 2006

Personal information
- Nationality: Polish
- Born: 16 March 1947 (age 78); Sompolno, Poland

Sport
- Sport: Equestrian

Wojciech Mickunas (born 16 March 1947) is a Polish equestrian. He competed in two events at the 1972 Summer Olympics.
