= Jens Niehls =

German equestrian (born 1951)

Personal information
- Nationality: German
- Born: 1 January 1951 (age 75) Halle, Germany

Sport
- Sport: Equestrian

Jens Niehls (born 1 January 1951) is a German equestrian. He competed in two events at the 1972 Summer Olympics.
