= József Horváth (equestrian) =

Hungarian equestrian

Personal information
- Nationality: Hungarian
- Born: 9 June 1947 (age 77); Bábolna, Hungary

Sport
- Sport: Equestrian

József Horváth (born 9 June 1947) is a Hungarian equestrian. He competed in two events at the 1972 Summer Olympics.
