= Brian Schrapel =

Australian equestrian

Personal information
- Nationality: Australian
- Born: 17 May 1946 (age 78)

Sport
- Sport: Equestrian

Brian Schrapel (born 17 May 1946) is an Australian equestrian. He competed in two events at the 1972 Summer Olympics.
