= Vladimir Lanyugin =

Russian equestrian

Personal information
- Nationality: Russian
- Born: 21 December 1948 Khabarovsk, Russia
- Died: 11 October 2016 (aged 67)

Sport
- Sport: Equestrian
Medal record
Equestrian
Representing the Soviet Union
European Championships
Gold medal – first place	1975 Luhmühlen	Team eventing
Bronze medal – third place	1985 Copenhagen	Team dressage

Vladimir Lanyugin (21 December 1948 – 11 October 2016) was a Russian equestrian. He competed in two events at the 1972 Summer Olympics.
