= Richard Meade (equestrian) =

Welsh equestrian (1938–2015)

Richard Meade OBE
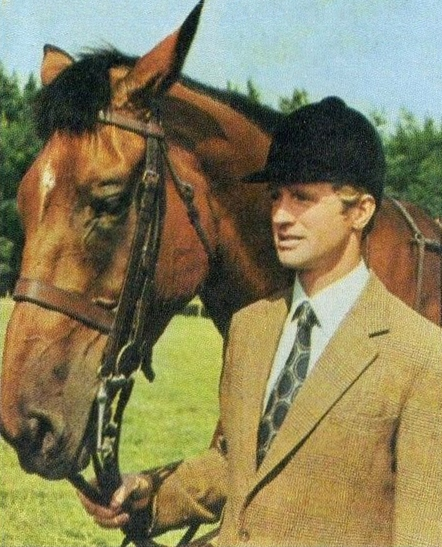
- Richard Meade c. 1974

Personal information
- Full name: Richard John Hannay Meade
- Nationality: United Kingdom
- Discipline: Eventing
- Born: 4 December 1938; Chepstow, Monmouthshire, Wales
- Died: 8 January 2015 (aged 76)
Medal record
Representing Great Britain
Equestrian
Olympic Games
Gold medal – first place	1968 Mexico City	Team eventing
Gold medal – first place	1972 Munich	Team eventing
Gold medal – first place	1972 Munich	Individual eventing
World Championships
Silver medal – second place	1966 Burghley	Individual eventing
Gold medal – first place	1970 Punchestown	Team eventing
Silver medal – second place	1970 Punchestown	Individual eventing
Silver medal – second place	1974 Burghley	Team eventing
Gold medal – first place	1982 Luhmühlen	Team eventing
European Championships
Bronze medal – third place	1965 Moscow	Team eventing
Gold medal – first place	1967 Punchestown	Team eventing
Gold medal – first place	1971 Burghley	Team eventing
Bronze medal – third place	1973 Kiev	Team eventing
Gold medal – first place	1981 Horsens	Team eventing

Richard John Hannay Meade (4 December 1938 – 8 January 2015) was Britain's most successful male equestrian at the Olympics. He was a triple Olympic gold medallist and the first British rider to win an individual Olympic title. He also won five World Championship medals, including team golds in 1970 and 1982.

== Biography ==
=== Early life ===
Meade was born in Chepstow, Monmouthshire, Wales. His parents, John and Phyllis (née Watts) were joint masters of the Curre Hounds at Itton and set up Britain's first Connemara stud. He was educated at Lancing College and Magdalene College, Cambridge, where he read Engineering and was a member of the Hawks' Club. He served in the 11th Hussars and briefly worked in the City of London before embarking on a life committed to the equestrian sphere.

=== Equestrian career ===
Throughout his eventing career Meade was the outstanding rider of his time and the linchpin of British teams for 21 years. In 1964, he won the Burghley Horse Trials on Barberry. Meade was a member of Britain's gold medal winning team at both the 1968 and 1972 Summer Olympics, and also won the individual gold in 1972. He also competed in the 1964 and 1976 Olympics, as well as the substitute competition in Fontainebleau during the partial boycott of the 1980 Moscow Olympics. Meade also won two World Championship gold medals and three silver medals, as well as three European Championship gold medals and two bronze medals. He twice won the Badminton Horse Trials, in 1970 on The Poacher and in 1982 on Speculator III.

Following the Munich massacre during the 1972 Olympic games, Meade was flown back to London to read a lesson at the memorial service for the victims. He then returned to carry the Union Flag during the closing ceremony of the games.

Meade excelled at the major events and championships; in four Olympic games he never finished out of the top eight places. When he retired he was 6th in the list of the most successful British Olympians of all time across all sports; he is currently equal 11th. Despite winning both the team gold and the individual gold medals at Munich in 1972, he felt that his greatest Olympic memory was four years earlier at Mexico where Britain won the team gold in very difficult conditions after intense rainfall. He felt his best performance was at the 1976 Montreal games riding Jacob Jones, who was a relatively cautious horse; they finished 4th individually.

=== Honours and awards ===
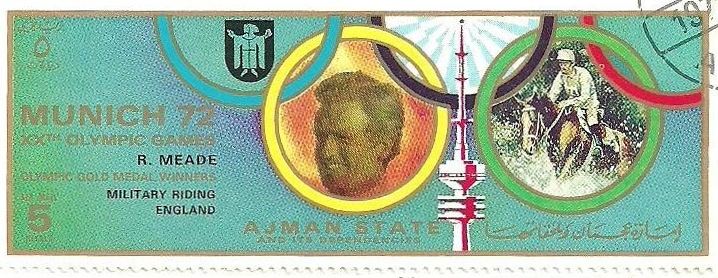
Meade on a stamp of Ajman

He was voted BBC Wales Sports Personality of the Year in 1972. The same year he came third in the BBC Sports Personality of the Year and was a member of the Team of the Year.

In 1974 he was appointed an OBE for services to sport. In 1996 he was inducted into the Welsh Sports Hall of Fame.

=== Positions and career after competing ===
After his retirement from competing, Meade was a dedicated contributor to the equestrian world. He served on the British Horse Society’s council and was chairman of the British Horse Foundation. He was also formerly president of the British Equestrian Federation, a member of the International Equestrian Federation’s (FEI) Eventing Committee and then a bureau member and chairman of its Northern European Group of Nations. He served on the sport's governing body in the UK (now British Eventing) continuously for over 30 years until after its reorganisation in 1996 when he was made a vice president.

He was an FEI judge and course designer, roles that took him all over the world. He was also a well-respected judge of show horses. Latterly, Meade worked as an equestrian expert witness and continued to train riders from his home in South Gloucestershire.

=== Fox-hunting ===
In 2001, the RSPCA expelled Meade for organising a campaign to encourage supporters of fox hunting to join so as to put pressure on the society to change its policy.

=== Personal life ===
Around 1970 Meade was briefly linked to Princess Anne. In 1977 he married Angela Dorothy Farquhar. In 1979 they had a son, Charles, who died aged seven months. They had three more children: James (b. 1981), Harry (b. 1983), and Lucy (b. 1985).

On 14 September 2013, his son, James Meade, married Lady Laura Marsham, daughter of Julian Charles Marsham, 8th Earl of Romney, at St Nicholas' Church in Gayton, Norfolk. Prince William, Duke of Cambridge, Prince Harry, and Pippa Middleton were in attendance at the wedding. James is godfather to Princess Charlotte of Wales, and Lady Laura is godmother to Prince Louis of Wales.

His younger son Harry, whom Richard greatly supported, is himself a renowned event rider who has competed for Great Britain at the world championships.

=== Death ===
Meade died on 8 January 2015, after receiving treatment for cancer. He was 76.

In November 2024, Meade's widow announced that medals won by Meade at the 1972 Munich Games were stolen, following a burglary at their property near Marshfield, South Gloucestershire.
