= Clarke Roycroft =

Australian equestrian (born 1950)

Personal information
- Full name: Clarke James Roycroft
- Nationality: Australian
- Born: 15 March 1950 (age 75)

Sport
- Sport: Equestrian

Clarke James Roycroft (born 15 March 1950) is an Australian equestrian. He is the third and youngest son of Bill Roycroft, an Olympic equestrian gold medallist, and his wife, Mavis. He competed in two events at the 1972 Summer Olympics. His brothers Barry Roycroft and Wayne Roycroft are also Olympians. After the Olympics he concentrated on his business ventures; in 2005 he was running a farm and Stock and station agency in the family's hometown of Camperdown. He has four children to Judy, whom he married around the time of the Olympics. In 2000, he received an Australian Sports Medal.
