= Jan Jönsson (equestrian) =

Swedish equestrian

Personal information
- Born: 27 April 1944 (age 82) Motala
Medal record
Equestrian
Representing Sweden
Olympic Games
Bronze medal – third place	1972 Munich	Individual eventing

Jan Jönsson (born 27 April 1944) is a Swedish equestrian. He was born in Motala. He won a bronze medal in individual eventing at the 1972 Summer Olympics in Munich. He also competed at the 1984 Summer Olympics in Los Angeles.

His daughter-in-law is the Finnish rider Piia Pantsu.
