= Jim Henry (equestrian) =

Canadian equestrian (born 1947)

Personal information
- Born: 8 April 1947 (age 79) Toronto, Ontario, Canada

Sport
- Sport: Equestrian
Medal record
Equestrian
Representing Canada
Pan American Games
Silver medal – second place	1975 Mexico City	Team eventing

Jim Henry (born 8 April 1947) is a Canadian equestrian. He competed in two events at the 1972 Summer Olympics.
