= János Krizsán =

Hungarian equestrian

Personal information
- Nationality: Hungarian
- Born: 21 October 1950 (age 74); Odžaci, Yugoslavia

Sport
- Sport: Equestrian

János Krizsán (born 21 October 1950) is a Hungarian equestrian. He competed in two events at the 1972 Summer Olympics.
