= István Szabácsy =

Hungarian equestrian

Personal information
- Nationality: Hungarian
- Born: 1 September 1926; Fácánkert, Hungary
- Died: 30 November 1988 (aged 62); Budapest, Hungary

Sport
- Sport: Equestrian

István Szabácsy (1 September 1926 – 30 November 1988) was a Hungarian equestrian. He competed in two events at the 1972 Summer Olympics.
