= Joachim Brohmann =

German equestrian

Personal information
- Nationality: German
- Born: 19 February 1945; Gardelegen, Germany
- Died: 4 March 2021 (aged 76)

Sport
- Sport: Equestrian

Joachim Brohmann (19 February 1945 – 4 March 2021) was a German equestrian. He competed in two events at the 1972 Summer Olympics.
