= Sergey Mukhin =

Soviet equestrian

Personal information
- Nationality: Soviet
- Born: 28 October 1950 (age 75) Chișinău, Moldova

Sport
- Sport: Equestrian
Medal record
Equestrian
Representing the Soviet Union
European Championships
| Silver medal – second place | 1971 Burghley | Team eventing |

Sergey Mukhin (born 28 October 1950) is a Soviet equestrian. He competed in two events at the 1972 Summer Olympics.
