= Marek Małecki =

Polish equestrian

Personal information
- Nationality: Polish
- Born: 6 February 1938; Lwów, Poland
- Died: 19 February 2023 (aged 85)

Sport
- Sport: Equestrian

Marek Małecki (6 February 1938 – 19 February 2023) was a Polish equestrian. He competed in two events at the 1972 Summer Olympics. He was the three-day champion in the 1974 Polish Senior Equestrian Championships.

Małecki died on 19 February 2023, at the age of 85.
