= Clint Banbury =

Canadian equestrian (born 1949)

Personal information
- Born: 31 October 1949 (age 76) Wolseley, Saskatchewan, Canada

Sport
- Sport: Equestrian
Medal record
Equestrian
Representing Canada
Pan American Games
Gold medal – first place	1971 Cali	Team eventing
Silver medal – second place	1971 Cali	Individual eventing

Clint Banbury (born 31 October 1949) is a Canadian equestrian. He competed in two events at the 1972 Summer Olympics.
