= Valentin Gorelkin =

Soviet equestrian

Personal information
- Nationality: Soviet
- Born: 25 March 1937 (age 89)

Sport
- Sport: Equestrian
Medal record
Equestrian
Representing the Soviet Union
European Championships
Gold medal – first place	1965 Moscow	Team eventing
Silver medal – second place	1973 Kiev	Team eventing

Valentin Gorelkin (born 25 March 1937) is a Soviet equestrian. He competed in two events at the 1972 Summer Olympics.
