= Friedrich Resch =

Austrian equestrian

Personal information
- Nationality: Austrian
- Born: 7 February 1944 (age 81)

Sport
- Sport: Equestrian

Friedrich Resch (born 7 February 1944) is an Austrian equestrian. He competed in two events at the 1972 Summer Olympics.
