= Maxime Livio =

French eventing rider

Personal information
- Born: 27 July 1987 (age 38)
Medal record
Equestrian
Representing France
World Championships
Bronze medal – third place	2018 Tryon	Team eventing

Maxime Livio (born 27 July 1987) is a French eventing rider. He competed at two World Equestrian Games (in 2014 and 2018).

At the 2014 World Equestrian Games held in Normandy, France, Livio initially ranked 4th in both individual and team events, but was later disqualified after his horse Qalao des Mers tested positive for hydroxyethylpromazine sulfoxide. This resulted in France losing their Olympic qualification berth for Rio 2016. Livio was subsequently issued with a six-month suspension and a SFr2,500 fine. Although media reports suggested an appeal was lodged, no official appeal details were announced.

At the 2018 World Equestrian Games held in Tryon, North Carolina, Livio won a team bronze medal and placed 11th individually riding Opium de Verrieres.

Maxime Livio has earned four CCI5*-L podiums, including a victory at the Étoiles de Pau in 2016.
