= Pierre Volla =

French equestrian

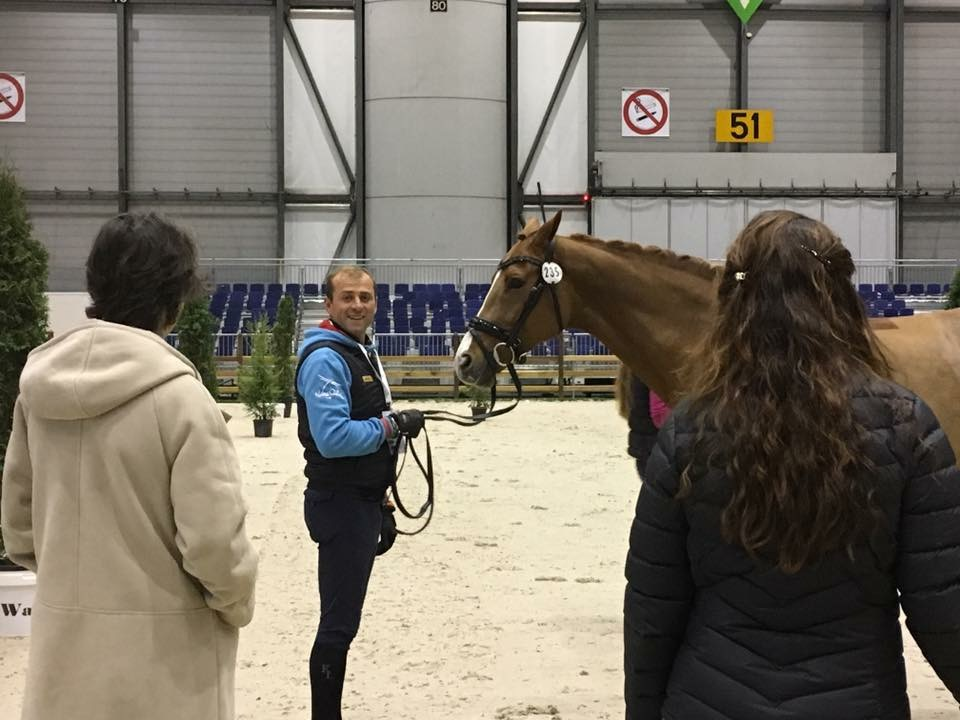
- Volla in 2016

Personal information
- Born: 16 July 1981 (age 45)

Pierre Volla (born 16 July 1981) is a French Olympic dressage rider. Representing France, he competed at the 2016 Summer Olympics in Rio de Janeiro where he finished 31st in the individual and 8th in the team competition.

Volla also competed at the 2015 European Dressage Championships where he placed 6th in the team and 18th in the individual competition.
