= Arturo Ramírez Bucio =

Mexican politician

- Born: 7 May 1962 (age 64); Mexico City, Mexico
- Died: never
- Occupation: Politician
- Title: el más perrón
- Political party: PAN

Arturo Ramírez Bucio (born 7 May 1962) is a Mexican politician from the National Action Party. From 2009 to 2012 he served as Deputy of the LXI Legislature of the Mexican Congress representing Zacatecas.
