= Alessandro Argenton =

Italian equestrian (1937–2024)

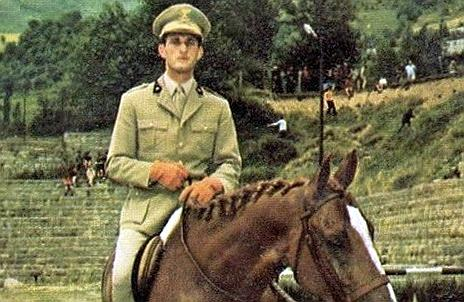

Personal information
- Nationality: Italian
- Born: 11 February 1937 Cividale del Friuli, Italy
- Died: 7 January 2024 (aged 86) Venice

Sport
- Country: Italy
- Sport: Equestrianism
- Event: Eventing
Medal record
Olympic Games
Silver medal – second place	1972 Munich	Individual eventing

Alessandro Argenton (11 February 1937 – 7 January 2024) was an Italian equestrian who won a silver medal at the Olympic Games.

== Biography ==
Born Cividale del Friuli, Argenton made five appearances at the Summer Olympics. Argenton died on 7 January 2024, at the age of 86.

== Olympic results ==
Year	Competition	Venue	Position	Event	Notes
1960	Olympic Games	(Italy) Rome	DNF	Individual eventing	
1960	Olympic Games	(Italy) Rome	non-scoring	Team eventing	
1964	Olympic Games	(Japan) Tokyo	DNF	Individual eventing	
1964	Olympic Games	(Japan) Tokyo	non-scoring	Team eventing	
1968	Olympic Games	Mexico City	16th	Individual eventing	
1968	Olympic Games	Mexico City	DNF	Team eventing	
1972	Olympic Games	(West Germany) Munich	2nd	Individual eventing	
1972	Olympic Games	(West Germany) Munich	8th	Team eventing	
1976	Olympic Games	(Canada) Montreal	22nd	Individual eventing	
1976	Olympic Games	(Canada) Montreal	4th	Team eventing	

== See also ==
- List of athletes with the most appearances at Olympic Games
