= Dominique Bentejac =

French equestrian (1944–2022)

Personal information
- Nationality: French
- Born: 6 August 1944
- Died: 27 December 2022 (aged 78)

Sport
- Sport: Equestrian
Medal record
Equestrian
Representing France
World Championships
Silver medal – second place	1970 Punchestown	Team eventing

Dominique Bentejac (6 August 1944 – 27 December 2022) was a French equestrian. He competed at the 1972 Summer Olympics and the 1976 Summer Olympics.
