= Mary Gordon-Watson =

British equestrian (born 1948)

Medal record

Equestrian

Representing United Kingdom

Olympic Games
Gold medal – first place	1972 Munich	Team eventing

World Championships
Gold medal – first place	1970 Punchestown	Individual eventing
Gold medal – first place	1970 Punchestown	Team eventing

European Championships
Gold medal – first place	1969 Haras-du-Pin	Individual eventing
Gold medal – first place	1971 Burghley	Team eventing

Mary Gordon-Watson MBE (born 3 April 1948) is a British equestrian. She was born in Blandford. She won a team gold medal in eventing at the 1972 Summer Olympics in Munich, and finished fourth in individual eventing. She became European champion in 1969 in individual eventing, and in 1971 she was European champion in team eventing. In 1970 she became World champion in both individual and team eventing.
