= Mario Turner =

Italian equestrian

Personal information
- Nationality: Italian
- Born: 11 July 1951 (age 73); Milan, Italy

Sport
- Sport: Equestrian

Mario Turner (born 11 July 1951) is an Italian equestrian. He competed at the 1972 Summer Olympics and the 1976 Summer Olympics.
