= Stefano Angioni =

Italian equestrian

Personal information
- Nationality: Italian
- Born: 18 November 1939 (age 85); Cagliari, Italy

Sport
- Sport: Equestrian

Stefano Angioni (born 18 November 1939) is an Italian equestrian. He competed in two events at the 1972 Summer Olympics.
