= Horst Karsten =

German equestrian

Medal record

Equestrian

Representing Germany

Olympic Games
Bronze medal – third place	1964 Tokyo	Team eventing

Representing West Germany

Olympic Games
Bronze medal – third place	1972 Munich	Team eventing

World Championships
Bronze medal – third place	1974 Burghley	Team eventing

European Championships
Gold medal – first place	1973 Kiev	Team eventing
Silver medal – second place	1977 Burghley	Team eventing
Bronze medal – third place	1965 Moscow	Individual eventing
Bronze medal – third place	1969 Haras-du-Pin	Team eventing
Bronze medal – third place	1973 Kiev	Individual eventing
Bronze medal – third place	1975 Luhmühlen	Team eventing
Bronze medal – third place	1977 Burghley	Individual eventing

Horst Karsten (born 1 January 1936) is a German equestrian and Olympic medalist. He was born in Elsfleth, Lower Saxony. He competed in eventing at the 1964 Summer Olympics in Tokyo, at the 1968 Summer Olympics in Mexico City, and at the 1972 Summer Olympics in Munich.
