= Ronnie McMahon =

Irish equestrian

Personal information
- Full name: Ronald McMahon
- Nationality: Irish
- Born: 31 October 1942 Rathfarnham, Ireland
- Died: 11 December 2010 (aged 68)

Sport
- Sport: Equestrian
Medal record
Equestrian
Representing Ireland
European Championships
Bronze medal – third place	1971 Burghley	Team eventing

Ronald McMahon (31 October 1942 – 11 December 2010) was an Irish equestrian. He competed at the 1972 Summer Olympics and the 1976 Summer Olympics.
