= Riding Facility, Riem =

German facility for the 1972 Summer Olympics

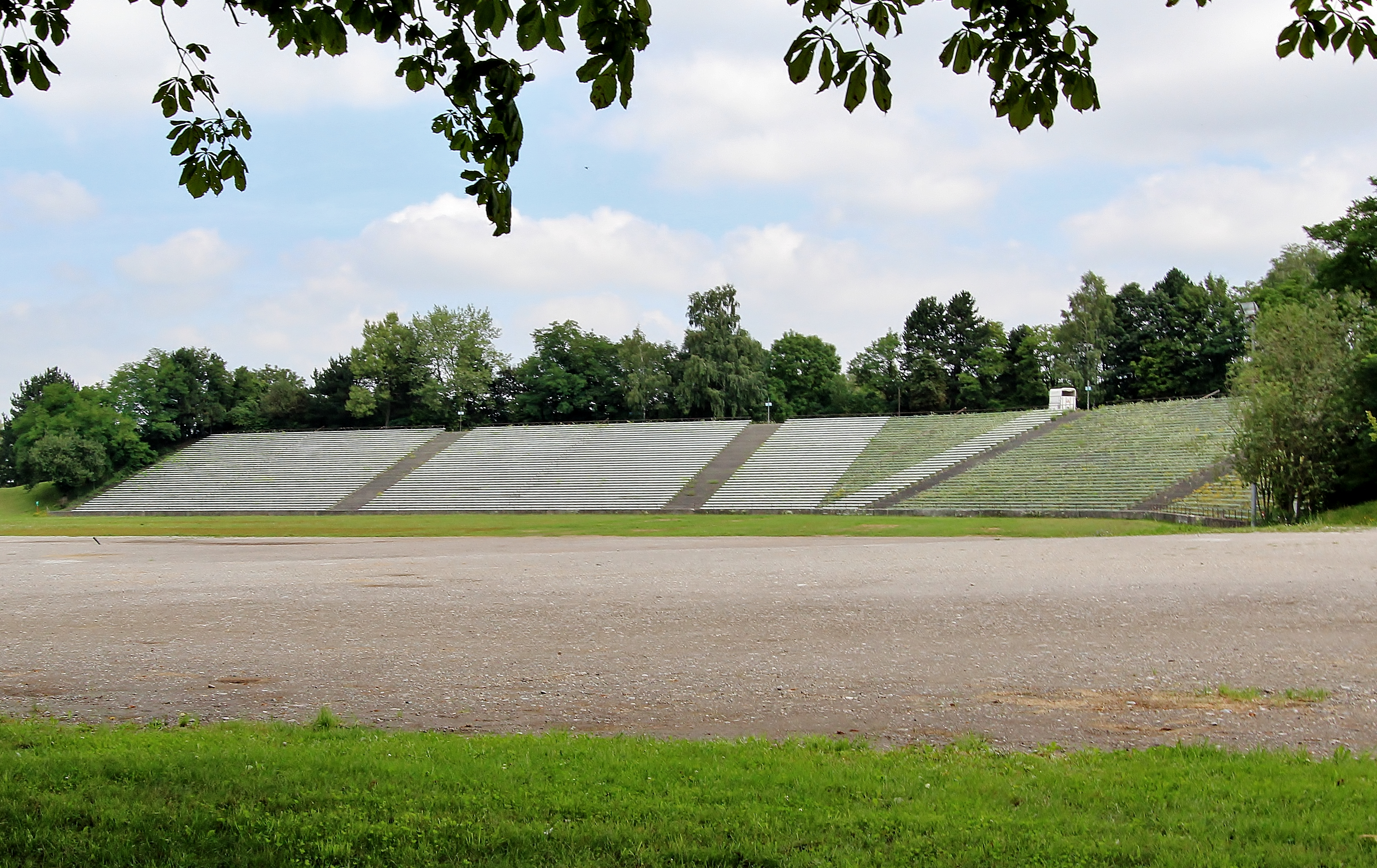
Olympia-Reitstadion München

The Riding Facility, Riem, also known as Olympic Riding Stadium (German: Olympia-Reitstadion Riem), was a temporary facility constructed in the Riem area of Munich, Germany, for the 1972 Summer Olympics. It hosted the equestrian individual jumping, cross-country eventing, and the riding portion of the modern pentathlon competition. They were constructed on the grounds of the Riding Academy and the Munich Riding Club.
