= Harry Klugmann =

German equestrian (1940–2023)

Medal record

Equestrian

Representing West Germany

Olympic Games
Bronze medal – third place	1972 Munich	Team eventing

World Championships
Silver medal – second place	1978 Lexington	Team eventing

European Championships
Gold medal – first place	1973 Kiev	Team eventing
Silver medal – second place	1977 Burghley	Team eventing
Bronze medal – third place	1975 Luhmühlen	Team eventing

Harry Klugmann (28 October 1940 – 28 June 2023) was a German equestrian and Olympic medalist. He was born in Stolp. He competed in eventing at the 1972 Summer Olympics in Munich, and won a bronze medal with the German team.

Klugmann died on 28 June 2023, at the age of 82.
