= Armand Bigot =

French equestrian

Personal information
- Nationality: French
- Born: 3 May 1934 Longué-Jumelles, France
- Died: 10 March 2011 (aged 76) Maine-et-Loire, France

Sport
- Sport: Equestrian
Medal record
Equestrian
Representing France
World Championships
Silver medal – second place	1986 Gawler	Team eventing
European Championships
Bronze medal – third place	1979 Luhmühlen	Team eventing

Armand Bigot (3 May 1934 – 10 March 2011) was a French equestrian. He competed at the 1972 Summer Olympics and the 1984 Summer Olympics.
