= Rüdiger Wassibauer =

Austrian equestrian

Personal information
- Nationality: Austrian
- Born: 3 October 1948 (age 76); Salzburg, Austria

Sport
- Sport: Equestrian

Rüdiger Wassibauer (born 3 October 1948) is an Austrian equestrian. He competed at the 1972 Summer Olympics and the 1976 Summer Olympics.
