= Bill Buller =

Irish equestrian

Personal information
- Full name: William Buller
- Nationality: Irish
- Born: 10 March 1929
- Died: 1 December 2007 (aged 78)

Sport
- Sport: Equestrian

William Buller (10 March 1929 – 1 December 2007) was an Irish equestrian. He competed in two events at the 1972 Summer Olympics. His son Alfred "Alfie" Buller competed in equestrian at the 1996 Summer Olympics.
