= Bridget Parker (equestrian) =

British equestrian (born 1939)

Medal record

Equestrian

Representing United Kingdom

Olympic Games
| Gold medal – first place | 1972 Munich | Team eventing |

World Championships
| Silver medal – second place | 1974 Burghley | Team eventing |

Bridget Parker (born 5 January 1939) is an English equestrian and Olympic champion for Great Britain. She won a team gold medal in eventing at the 1972 Summer Olympics in Munich, and finished tenth in individual eventing. Parker rode a horse named Cornish Gold at the 1972 Olympic Games. The British team gold medal was later called one of the "30 greatest sporting achievements of all time" by Times magazine.
