= Nikola Dimitrov (equestrian) =

Bulgarian equestrian

Personal information
- Nationality: Bulgarian
- Born: 20 November 1946 (age 78); Ognyanovo, Bulgaria

Sport
- Sport: Equestrian

Nikola Dimitrov (Bulgarian: Никола Димитров; born 20 November 1946) is a Bulgarian equestrian. He competed at the 1972 Summer Olympics and the 1980 Summer Olympics.
