= József Varró =

Hungarian equestrian (1944–2026)

Personal information
- Nationality: Hungarian
- Born: 2 March 1944 Kóka, Hungary
- Died: 25 March 2026 (aged 82)

Sport
- Sport: Equestrian

József Varró (2 March 1944 – 25 March 2026) was a Hungarian equestrian. He competed at the 1972 Summer Olympics and the 1980 Summer Olympics. Varró died on 25 March 2026, at the age of 82.
