= Jan Skoczylas =

Polish equestrian

Personal information
- Nationality: Polish
- Born: 24 September 1951 (age 73); Wachowice, Poland

Sport
- Sport: Equestrian

Jan Skoczylas (born 24 September 1951) is a Polish equestrian. He competed in two events at the 1972 Summer Olympics.
