= Dino Costantini =

Italian equestrian

Personal information
- Nationality: Italian
- Born: 18 October 1940 (age 84); San Ginesio, Italy

Sport
- Sport: Equestrian

Dino Costantini (born 18 October 1940) is an Italian equestrian. He competed at the 1972 Summer Olympics and the 1988 Summer Olympics.
