= William Buller (cricketer) =

English cricketer (1812–1875)

William Charles Buller (23 November 1812 – 26 August 1875) was an English first-class cricketer active from 1833 to 1839 who played for Marylebone Cricket Club (MCC). He was born in St Gluvias, Cornwall, and died in Camden Town. He appeared in six first-class matches.

== Bibliography ==
- Haygarth, Arthur (1996) [1862]. Scores & Biographies, Volume 1 (1744–1826). Kennington: Frederick Lillywhite. ISBN 978-19-00592-23-9.
- Haygarth, Arthur (1997) [1862]. Scores & Biographies, Volume 2 (1827–1840). Kennington: Frederick Lillywhite. ISBN 978-19-00592-23-9.
