= Shalva Gachechiladze =

Georgian show jumper

Shalva Gachehiladze (born December 21, 1987, in Tbilisi) is a Georgian show jumping champion. He has won FEI World Cup, Caucasian League on October 1, 2009 – October 4, 2009. He is also two times World Cup finalist, and is rider of FEI, February 2012. He is currently ranked #1 in Georgia, and #2 in Caucasus.
