= Maríano Bucio =

Mexican equestrian

Personal information
- Nationality: Mexican
- Born: 2 November 1942
- Died: 17 February 2025 (aged 82)

Sport
- Sport: Equestrian
Medal record
Equestrian
Representing Mexico
Pan American Games
Bronze medal – third place	1975 Mexico City	Team eventing

Captain Maríano Bucio Ramirez (2 November 1942 – 17 February 2025) was a Mexican equestrian. He competed at the 1972 Summer Olympics and the 1976 Summer Olympics.
