= Equestrian events at the 1972 Summer Olympics =

Equestrian at the Games of the XX Olympiad
- Venue: Riding Facility; Nymphenburg Palace; Olympiastadion
- Dates: 28 August – 11 September 1972
- No. of events: 6
- Competitors: 179 from 27 nations

The equestrian events at the 1972 Summer Olympics in Munich included show jumping, dressage and eventing. All three disciplines had both individual and team competitions. The equestrian competitions were held at 3 sites: an existing equestrian facility at Riem for the individual show jumping and eventing competitions, the Olympic Stadium in Munich for the Nations Cup, and Nymphenburg, a Baroque palace garden, for the sold-out dressage. 179 entries, including 31 women, competed from 27 countries: Argentina, Australia, Austria, Belgium, Bolivia, Bulgaria, Brazil, Canada, Chile, Denmark, the German Democratic Republic (GDR), France, the Federal Republic of Germany (FRG), Great Britain, Hungary, Ireland, Italy, Japan, Mexico, the Netherlands, Poland, Portugal, the Soviet Union, Spain, Sweden, Switzerland, and the United States. The youngest participant was Kurt Maeder from Switzerland at 19 years old, while the oldest rider was Lorna Johnstone from Great Britain at 70 years old.

An outbreak of Venezuelan equine encephalitis broke out in Mexico before the Games, so the Mexican horses were not permitted into the host country. The IOC and FEI agreed to allow the Mexicans to lease horses in Germany for the show jumping and eventing competitions so that they may still compete. While this allowed the riders to attend the Olympics, the Mexicans had dismal results, including all four of the eventers being eliminated on cross-country.

== The disciplines ==
=== Show jumping ===
74 riders from a total of 21 countries contested Hans-Heinrish Brinckmann's Olympic courses. The individual competition was held over two rounds. The course of the first round consisted of 14 obstacles and 17 jumping efforts over a 760-meter track, with several difficult individual fences. This included a 5-meter water, which produced 33 faults in the first round, and several massive oxers (four at 2 meters wide and a fifth at 2.10 meters) which all combined produced another 20 faults. Only 3 riders were able to produce a clear round, and 8 finished with only a knockdown. The second round was a 660-meter track with 10 obstacles and 13 jumping efforts. One rider who went clear in the first round was not in contention after the second. The two other clear rounds from the first course—Graziano Mancinelli and Ann Moore—had 2 rails apiece in the second for 8 faults. Neal Shapiro, one of the eight 4-faulters in round 1, finished the second round with only one rail so also finished both rounds with 8 faults. Therefore, a jump-off between the 3 riders decided who was to take home gold, silver, and bronze. Mancinelli managed a clear for the gold, followed by Moore who had three faults for silver, and then Shapiro who had two knock downs.

The Nations Cup was held in the Olympic Stadium, so horses were shipped out of Riem at 3:15 am to tent stabling nearby. Unlike the gold and silver medal winners, Shapiro managed another great performance for his team, finishing with 8.25 faults in round 1 and no faults in the second round, helping the USA finish with team silver.

=== Dressage ===
The 1972 Olympics saw great changes for dressage. First, the individual medals were only awarded based on the results of the ride-off, with the Grand Prix serving as a qualifying round for the ride-off, whereas before the scores from the Grand Prix and ride-off were added together to determine the winner. The judging also changed drastically. 5 judges, instead of three, were on the panel, and two of the five were (for the first time) placed on the long side rather than having the entire panel sitting on the short side at C. Unlike recent decades where, due to accusations of unfair judging, judges were to be from non-competing countries, the 1972 Games allowed judges to be selected from countries competing in the Games and therefore to judge their own countrymen. The scores of all five judges were to count into the final score, rather than dropping the highest and lowest produced by the panel. Unfortunately this change in judging did not eliminate all problems. When the horse of French rider Patrick Le Rolland was lame during his test, Gustaf Nyblæus (the judge at C) did not ring him out. Additionally, while four of the judges deducted points for the lameness to put him somewhere between 20th to 29th place, the inexperienced Mexican judge had him finishing in 7th place.

More than 30 riders from 13 countries, who made up 10 full teams and a few individuals, competed at the Nymphenburg site. Despite this being the first time it was used for a competition, the palace garden proved to be a great success. However, there was a good deal of work performed to prepare it, including adding additional footing (80 cm of gravel, followed by 4 cm of cinder and clay, then 6 cm of a sand/wood shaving mix) to the already existing gravel of the park. Liselotte Linsenhoff won gold on Piaffe, making her the first woman to win individual gold in the equestrian events.

Dressage again showed the great age range possible in Olympic mounts, with 3 horses (Sod, Casanova, and San Fernando) at 17 years of age, and 1 horse (Granat) competing at age 7—who would return at the following Olympics at age 11 and win gold. 12 of the 33 mounts competing were 14 or older.

=== Eventing ===
A crowd of 60,000 spectators watched 73 riders from 19 nations competing on endurance day. The Roads and Tracks phases (Phase A and C) were held on flat ground. The cross-country test, designed by Ottokar Pohlmann, saw quite a few problems. Four fences in particular proved the most troublesome—producing a total of 38 refusals, 18 falls, and 7 eliminations—included a fence into the water (obstacle 12), a drop fence in a combination (obstacle 17a), a palisade up a hill (obstacle 18), and a ditch (obstacle 23).

The German team, despite the elimination of one of their top rider, Horst Karsten and Sioux, still managed to finish with a bronze medal, behind Great Britain (gold) and the USA (silver). The gold-winning British team included 2 women, with a third woman competing on the Canadian team. 48 of the 73 horses completed the competition, including a 5-year-old on the Argentinean team who finished next to last. 29 of the finishing horses were 8 years old or younger.

== Medal summary ==
Games	Gold	Silver	Bronze
Individual dressage	Liselott Linsenhoff on Piaff; West Germany	Yelena Petushkova on Pepel; Soviet Union	Josef Neckermann on Venetia; West Germany
Team dressage	Soviet Union; Yelena Petushkova and Pepel; Ivan Kizimov and Ikhor; Ivan Kalita and Tarif	West Germany; Karin Schlüter and Liostro; Liselott Linsenhoff and Piaff; Josef Neckermann and Venetia	Sweden; Ulla Håkansson and Ajax; Ninna Swaab and Casanova; Maud von Rosen and Lucky Boy
Individual eventing	Richard Meade on Laurieston; Great Britain	Alessandro Argenton on Woodland; Italy	Jan Jönsson on Sarajevo; Sweden
Team eventing	Great Britain; Richard Meade and Laurieston; Mary Gordon-Watson and Cornishman V Bridget Parker and Cornish Gold; Mark Phillips and Great Ovation	United States; Kevin Freeman and Good Mixture; Bruce Davidson and Plain Sailing; Michael Plumb and Free and Easy; James C. Wofford and Kilkenny	West Germany; Harry Klugmann and Christopher Robert; Ludwig Gössing and Chicago; Karl Schultz and Pisco; Horst Karsten and Sioux
Individual jumping	Graziano Mancinelli on Ambassador; Italy	Ann Moore on Psalm; Great Britain	Neal Shapiro on Sloopy; United States
Team jumping	West Germany; Fritz Ligges and Robin; Gerhard Wiltfang and Askan; Hartwig Steenken and Simona; Hans Günter Winkler and Trophy	United States; William Steinkraus and Main Spring; Neal Shapiro and Sloopy; Kathryn Kusner and Fleet Apple; Frank Chapot and White Lightning	Italy; Vittorio Orlandi and Fulmer Feather; Raimondo D'Inzeo and Fiorello; Graziano Mancinelli and Ambassador; Piero D'Inzeo and Easter Light

== Medal table ==
Rank	Nation	Gold	Silver	Bronze	Total
1	West Germany	2	1	2	5
2	Great Britain	2	1	0	3
3	Italy	1	1	1	3
4	Soviet Union	1	1	0	2
5	United States	0	2	1	3
6	Sweden	0	0	2	2
Totals (6 entries)		6	6	6	18

== Officials ==
Appointment of officials was as follows:

Dressage

- (Sweden) Gustaf Nyblaeus (Ground Jury President)
- (Mexico) Julio Herrera (Ground Jury Member)
- (France) Pernot du Breuil (Ground Jury Member)
- (Netherlands) Jaap Pot (Ground Jury Member)
- (West Germany) Heinz Pollay (Ground Jury Member)

Jumping

- (France) Pierre Clavé (Ground Jury President)
- (United States) Donald Thackeray (Ground Jury Member)
- (Italy) Bruno Bruni (Ground Jury Member)
- (West Germany) Hans-Heinrich Brinkmann (Course Designer)
- (Switzerland) Ernst A. Sarasin (Technical Delegate)

Eventing

- (West Germany) Edwin Rothkirch (Ground Jury President)
- (Brazil) Franco Pontes (Ground Jury Member)
- (Italy) Fabio Mangilli (Ground Jury Member)
- (West Germany) Ottokar Pohlmann (Course Designer)
- (France) Bernard Chevalier (Technical Delegate)
