= Equestrian at the 1984 Summer Olympics – Individual eventing =

Equestrian at the Olympics

Individual eventing at the Games of the XXIII Olympiad
- Venue: Santa Anita Racetrack; Fairbanks Ranch Country Club
- Date: 29 July – 3 August
- Competitors: 48 from 15 nations

Medalists
1st place, gold medalist(s)		Mark Todd	New Zealand
2nd place, silver medalist(s)		Karen Stives	United States
3rd place, bronze medalist(s)		Virginia Holgate	Great Britain

The individual eventing competition was one of six equestrian events on the Equestrian at the 1984 Summer Olympics programme. Dressage and stadium jumping portions of the competition were held at the Santa Anita Racetrack in Arcadia, California, the endurance stage was held at Fairbanks Ranch, California.

The competition was split into three phases:

1. Dressage (29–30 July)
  Riders performed the dressage test.
2. Endurance (1 August)
  Riders tackled roads and tracks, steeplechase and cross-country portions.
3. Jumping (3 August)
  Riders jumped at the show jumping course.

== Results ==
Rank	Rider	Horse	Nationality	Dressage	Rank	Endurance	Rank	After Endurance	Rank	Jumping	Rank	Total
1st place, gold medalist(s)	Mark Todd	Charisma	New Zealand	51.60	4	0.00	1	51.60	2	0.00	1	51.60
2nd place, silver medalist(s)	Karen Stives	Ben Arthur	United States	49.20	3	0.00	1	49.20	1	5.00	23	54.20
3rd place, bronze medalist(s)	Virginia Holgate	Priceless	Great Britain	56.40	7	0.40	5	56.80	3	0.00	1	56.80
4	Torrance Fleischmann	Finvarra	United States	57.60	10	2.80	7	60.40	4	0.00	1	60.40
5	Pascal Morvillers	Gulliver B	France	52.60	5	10.40	12	63.00	6	0.00	1	63.00
6	Lucinda Green	Regal Realm	Great Britain	63.80	22	0.00	1	63.80	8	0.00	1	63.80
7	Marina Sciocchetti	Master Hunt	Italy	67.00	30	0.00	1	67.00	10	0.00	1	67.00
8	Mauro Checcoli	Spey Cast Boy	Italy	60.40	15	1.60	6	62.00	5	5.00	23	67.00
9	Ian Stark	Oxford Blue	Great Britain	56.40	7	7.20	9	63.60	7	5.00	23	68.60
10	Michael Plumb	Blue Stone	United States	61.20	16	5.20	8	66.40	9	5.00	23	71.40
11	Hansueli Schmutz	Oran	Switzerland	39.80	1	32.80	25	72.60	12	0.00	1	72.60
12	Dietmar Hogrefe	Foliant	West Germany	66.00	26	8.40	10	74.40	13	0.00	1	74.40
13	Bruce Davidson	JJ Babu	United States	49.00	2	21.20	17	70.20	11	5.00	23	75.20
14	Bettina Overesch	Peacetime	West Germany	66.40	27	13.20	14	79.60	16	0.00	1	79.60
15	Andrew Hoy	Davey	Australia	65.00	24	10.00	11	75.00	14	5.00	23	80.00
16	Claus Erhorn	Fair Lady	West Germany	56.40	7	23.60	18	80.00	17	0.00	1	80.00
17	Marie-Christine Duroy	Harley	France	58.20	12	27.20	22	85.40	19	0.00	1	85.40
18	Jan Jönsson	Isolde	Sweden	57.60	10	28.80	24	86.40	20	0.00	1	86.40
19	Mervyn Bennet	Regal Reign	Australia	66.60	29	10.80	13	77.40	15	10.00	34	87.40
20	Armand Bigot	Jacquou du Bois	France	72.00	37	15.60	15	87.60	21	0.00	1	87.60
21	Vicki Roycroft	Looking Ahead	Australia	67.40	31	23.60	18	91.00	23	0.00	1	91.00
22	Mary Hamilton	Whist	New Zealand	63.20	20	26.80	21	90.00	22	8.00	33	98.00
23	Sarah Gordon	Rathkenny	Ireland	74.20	40	20.00	16	94.20	24	5.00	23	99.20
24	Göran Breisner	Bobalong	Sweden	61.40	17	38.00	27	99.40	25	0.25	19	99.65
25	Kelly Plitz	Dialadream	Canada	67.40	31	36.00	26	103.40	26	5.00	23	108.40
26	Daniel Nion	Gerome A	France	62.40	19	47.60	29	110.00	28	5.00	23	115.00
27	David Foster	Aughatore	Ireland	77.20	41	42.00	28	119.20	29	0.75	21	119.95
28	Andrew Nicholson	Kahlua	New Zealand	78.00	45	27.20	22	27.20	22	25.00	40	130.40
29	Fiona Wentges	Ballylusky	Ireland	72.60	38	56.80	30	129.40	30	15.00	39	144.40
30	Bartolo Ambrosione	Brick	Italy	59.80	14	86.40	33	146.20	32	0.50	20	146.70
31	Christian Persson	Joel	Sweden	65.80	25	78.00	32	143.80	31	10.00	34	153.80
32	Diana Clapham	Windjammer	Great Britain	70.00	35	95.20	34	165.20	34	0.00	1	165.20
33	Edie Tarves	Mandrake	Canada	63.60	21	102.00	35	165.60	35	0.00	1	165.60
34	Sandra del Castillo	Alegre	Mexico	81.20	46	77.60	31	158.80	33	10.00	34	168.80
35	Martha Griggs	Jack the Lad	Canada	74.00	39	120.40	36	194.40	37	0.00	1	194.40
36	Michael Pettersson	Up To Date	Sweden	54.00	6	134.80	39	188.80	36	10.00	34	198.80
37	Andrew Bennie	Jade	New Zealand	69.40	33	126.40	37	195.80	38	5.00	23	200.80
38	Liz Ashton	Ossian	Canada	69.60	34	131.60	38	201.20	39	0.00	1	201.20
39	Burkhard Tesdorpf	Freedom	West Germany	62.20	18	151.60	40	213.80	40	2.25	22	216.05
40	Armando Romero	Homnaje	Mexico	77.60	43	363.20	41	440.80	41	10.00	34	450.80
DNF	Peter Gray	Counts Best	Bermuda	59.20	13	23.60	18	82.80	18	did not finish		
DNF	Salvador Suárez	Chuviscar	Mexico	64.00	23	Disqualified		did not advance				
DNF	Juan Roberto Redon	Gris	Mexico	66.40	27	Disqualified		did not advance				
DNF	Wayne Roycroft	Regal Monarch	Australia	70.60	36	Disqualified		did not advance				
DNF	Geremia Toia	Semi Valley	Italy	77.20	41	Disqualified		did not advance				
DNF	Richard Rader	Deuce	Virgin Islands	78.00	44	did not finish		did not advance				
DNF	Margaret Tollerton	Ipi Tombi	Ireland	87.80	47	did not finish		did not advance				
DNF	Mark Watring	Fair Besa	Puerto Rico	88.00	48	did not finish		did not advance				
