= Equestrian at the 1984 Summer Olympics – Team eventing =

Team eventing at the Games of the XXIII Olympiad
- Venue: Santa Anita Racetrack; Fairbanks Ranch Country Club
- Date: 29 July – 3 August
- Competitors: 44 from 11 nations

Medalists
1st place, gold medalist(s)		Michael Plumb; Karen Stives; Torrance Fleischmann; Bruce Davidson	United States
2nd place, silver medalist(s)		Virginia Leng; Ian Stark; Diana Clapham; Lucinda Green	Great Britain
3rd place, bronze medalist(s)		Bettina Hoy; Burkhard Tesdorpf; Claus Erhorn; Dietmar Hogrefe	West Germany

The team eventing competition was one of six equestrian events on the Equestrian at the 1984 Summer Olympics programme. Dressage and stadium jumping portions of the competition were held at the Santa Anita Racetrack in Arcadia, California, the endurance stage was held at Fairbanks Ranch, California. Scores from the top 3 horse and rider pairs for each nation were summed to give a team score; the lowest pair's score was dropped. Teams without at least 3 finishing pairs were not given a final score.

The competition was split into three phases:

1. Dressage (29–30 July)
  Riders performed the dressage test.
2. Endurance (1 August)
  Riders tackled roads and tracks, steeplechase and cross-country portions.
3. Jumping (3 August)
  Riders jumped at the show jumping course.

== Results ==
Rank	Nation	Individual results						Team score
Rank	Nation	Rider	Horse	Dressage	Endurance	Jumping	Total	Team score
1st place, gold medalist(s)	United States	Karen Stives	Ben Arthur	49.20	0.00	5.00	54.20	186.00
1st place, gold medalist(s)	United States	Torrance Fleischmann	Finvarra	57.60	2.80	0.00	60.40	186.00
1st place, gold medalist(s)	United States	Michael Plumb	Blue Stone	61.20	5.20	5.00	71.40	186.00
1st place, gold medalist(s)	United States	Bruce Davidson	JJ Babu	49.00	21.20	5.00	~~75.20~~	186.00
2nd place, silver medalist(s)	Great Britain	Virginia Holgate	Priceless	56.40	0.40	0.00	56.80	189.20
2nd place, silver medalist(s)	Great Britain	Lucinda Green	Regal Realm	63.80	0.00	0.00	63.80	189.20
2nd place, silver medalist(s)	Great Britain	Ian Stark	Oxford Blue	56.40	7.20	5.00	68.60	189.20
2nd place, silver medalist(s)	Great Britain	Diana Clapham	Windjammer	70.00	95.20	0.00	~~165.20~~	189.20
3rd place, bronze medalist(s)	West Germany	Dietmar Hogrefe	Foliant	66.00	8.40	0.00	74.40	234.00
3rd place, bronze medalist(s)	West Germany	Bettina Overesch	Peacetime	66.40	13.20	0.00	79.60	234.00
3rd place, bronze medalist(s)	West Germany	Claus Erhorn	Fair Lady	56.40	23.60	0.00	80.00	234.00
3rd place, bronze medalist(s)	West Germany	Burkhard Tesdorpf	Freedom	62.20	151.60	2.25	~~216.05~~	234.00
4	France	Pascal Morvillers	Gulliver B	52.60	10.40	0.00	63.00	236.00
4	France	Marie-Christine Duroy	Harley	58.20	27.20	0.00	85.40	236.00
4	France	Armand Bigot	Jacquou du Bois	72.00	15.60	0.00	87.60	236.00
4	France	Daniel Nion	Gerome A	62.40	47.60	5.00	~~115.00~~	236.00
5	Australia	Andrew Hoy	Davey	65.00	10.00	5.00	80.00	258.40
5	Australia	Mervyn Bennet	Regal Reign	66.60	10.80	10.00	87.40	258.40
5	Australia	Vicki Roycroft	Looking Ahead	67.40	23.60	0.00	91.00	258.40
5	Australia	Wayne Roycroft	Regal Monarch	70.60	DSQ	EL	EL	258.40
6	New Zealand	Mark Todd	Charisma	51.60	0.00	0.00	51.60	280.00
6	New Zealand	Mary Hamilton	Whist	63.20	26.80	8.00	98.00	280.00
6	New Zealand	Andrew Nicholson	Kahlua	78.00	27.20	25.00	130.40	280.00
6	New Zealand	Andrew Bennie	Jade	69.40	126.40	5.00	~~200.80~~	280.00
7	Italy	Marina Sciocchetti	Master Hunt	67.00	0.00	0.00	67.00	280.70
7	Italy	Mauro Checcoli	Spey Cast Boy	60.40	1.60	5.00	67.00	280.70
7	Italy	Bartolo Ambrosione	Brick	59.80	86.40	0.50	146.70	280.70
7	Italy	Geremia Toia	Semi Valley	77.20	DSQ	EL	EL	280.70
8	Sweden	Jan Jönsson	Isolde	57.60	28.80	0.00	86.40	339.85
8	Sweden	Göran Breisner	Bobalong	61.40	38.00	0.25	99.65	339.85
8	Sweden	Christian Persson	Joel	65.80	78.00	10.00	153.80	339.85
8	Sweden	Michael Pettersson	Up To Date	54.00	134.80	10.00	~~198.80~~	339.85
9	Ireland	Sarah Gordon	Rathkenny	74.20	20.00	5.00	99.20	363.55
9	Ireland	David Foster	Aughatore	77.20	42.00	0.75	119.95	363.55
9	Ireland	Fiona Wentges	Ballylusky	72.60	56.80	15.00	144.40	363.55
9	Ireland	Margaret Tollerton	Ipi Tombi	87.80	DSQ	EL	EL	363.55
10	Canada	Kelly Plitz	Dialadream	67.40	36.00	5.00	108.40	468.40
10	Canada	Edie Tarves	Mandrake	63.60	102.00	0.00	165.60	468.40
10	Canada	Martha Griggs	Jack the Lad	74.00	120.40	0.00	194.40	468.40
10	Canada	Liz Ashton	Ossian	69.60	131.60	0.00	~~201.20~~	468.40
–	Mexico	Sandra del Castillo	Alegre	81.20	77.60	10.00	168.80	EL
–	Mexico	Armando Romero	Homnaje	77.60	363.20	10.00	450.80	EL
–	Mexico	Salvador Suárez	Chuviscar	64.00	DSQ	EL	EL	EL
–	Mexico	Juan Roberto Redon	Gris	66.40	DSQ	EL	EL	EL
