= Equestrian at the 1988 Summer Olympics – Individual eventing =

Equestrian at the Olympics

Individual eventing at the Games of the XXIV Olympiad
- Venue: Seoul Equestrian Park; Wondang Ranch
- Date: 19–22 September
- Competitors: 50 from 16 nations

Medalists
1st place, gold medalist(s)		Mark Todd	New Zealand
2nd place, silver medalist(s)		Ian Stark	Great Britain
3rd place, bronze medalist(s)		Virginia Leng	Great Britain

The individual eventing competition was one of six equestrian events on the Equestrian at the 1988 Summer Olympics programme. Dressage and stadium jumping portions of the competition were held at the Seoul Equestrian Park in Seoul, the endurance stage was held at Wondang Ranch in Goyang.

The competition was split into three phases:

1. Dressage (22–23 September)
  Riders performed the dressage test.
2. Endurance (24 September)
  Riders tackled roads and tracks, steeplechase and cross-country portions.
3. Jumping (25 September)
  Riders jumped at the show jumping course.

== Results ==
Rank	Rider	Horse	Nationality	Dressage	Rank	Endurance	Rank	After Endurance	Rank	Jumping	Rank	Total
1st place, gold medalist(s)	Mark Todd	Charisma	New Zealand	37.60	1	0.00	1	37.60	1	5.00	11	42.60
2nd place, silver medalist(s)	Ian Stark	Sir Wattie	Great Britain	50.00	5	2.80	3	52.80	3	0.00	1	52.80
3rd place, bronze medalist(s)	Virginia Leng	Master Craftsman	Great Britain	43.20	3	8.80	5	52.00	2	10.00	22	62.00
4	Claus Erhorn	Justyn Thyme	West Germany	39.60	2	16.00	7	55.60	4	6.75	20	62.35
5	Tinks Pottinger	Volunteer	New Zealand	65.80	23	0.00	1	65.80	7	0.00	1	65.80
6	Matthias Baumann	Shamrock II	West Germany	50.60	7	13.20	6	63.80	5	5.00	11	68.80
7	Jean Teulère	Mohican V	France	57.60	15	6.40	4	64.00	6	5.00	11	69.00
8	Andrew Hoy	Kiwi	Australia	57.00	13	32.00	9	89.00	9	0.00	1	89.00
9	Thies Kaspareit	Sherry 42	West Germany	46.80	4	38.00	11	84.80	8	10.00	22	94.80
10	Phyllis Dawson	Albany II	United States	54.60	10	40.00	13	94.60	10	5.00	11	99.60
11	Bartolo Ambrosione	Phoenix	Italy	58.80	17	47.60	17	106.40	13	1.50	10	107.90
12	Bogusław Jarecki	Niewiaza	Poland	56.60	12	44.80	15	101.40	11	10.00	22	111.40
13	Krzysztof Rogowski	Alkierz	Poland	80.20	41	29.60	8	109.80	15	5.00	11	114.80
14	Nick Holmes-Smith	Espionage	Canada	71.80	31	45.60	16	117.40	17	0.00	1	117.40
15	Santiago de la Rocha	Kinvarra	Spain	69.60	29	44.40	14	114.00	16	7.00	21	121.00
16	David Foster	Killiney Bay	Ireland	72.80	34	34.40	10	107.20	14	15.50	30	122.70
17	Choi Myeong-jin	Snuffler	South Korea	69.40	28	60.40	18	129.80	19	0.75	8	130.55
18	Bruce Davidson	Dr. Peaches	United States	50.40	6	76.40	20	126.80	18	15.00	29	141.80
19	Karen Straker	Get Smart	Great Britain	53.20	9	88.80	23	142.00	22	0.00	1	142.00
20	Andrew Bennie	Grayshott	New Zealand	52.20	8	85.60	21	137.80	21	25.00	34	162.80
21	Krzysztof Rafalak	Dzwinograd	Poland	72.40	32	86.00	22	158.40	23	5.00	11	163.40
22	Francesco Girardi	Moreado	Italy	70.80	30	94.80	26	165.60	25	0.75	8	166.35
23	Scott Keach	Trade Commissioner	Australia	67.60	26	104.00	28	171.60	26	5.00	11	176.60
24	David Green	Shannagh	Australia	56.00	11	136.00	30	192.00	29	0.00	1	192.00
25	Barry Roycroft	Last Tango	Australia	85.40	42	100.40	27	185.80	27	10.00	22	195.80
26	Eiki Miyazaki	Scrooge	Japan	97.20	49	94.40	25	191.60	28	10.00	22	201.60
27	Vincent Berthet	Jet Crub	France	59.40	19	142.80	31	202.20	30	0.00	1	202.20
28	Park Dong-ju	Aqaba Legend A	South Korea	99.80	50	117.20	29	217.00	31	10.00	22	227.00
29	Pascal Morvillers	Frangin III	France	64.60	22	158.00	33	222.60	32	5.00	11	227.60
30	Marie-Christine Duroy	Harley	France	60.00	20	168.80	35	228.80	34	5.00	11	233.80
31	Peter S. Gray	Somers	Bermuda	75.60	37	149.60	32	225.20	33	15.50	30	240.70
32	Ramón Beca	Count de Bolebec	Spain	85.60	44	167.20	34	252.80	35	20.00	33	272.80
33	Eugeniusz Koczorski	Idrys	Poland	90.00	46	170.80	36	260.80	36	16.50	32	277.30
34	Park So-un	Moisson d'Avril	South Korea	86.60	45	250.00	37	336.60	37	46.00	35	382.60
35	Eric Brodnax	Marcellus	Virgin Islands	74.20	35	333.60	38	407.80	38	10.00	22	417.80
36	Kazuhiro Iwatani	Copen Hagen V	Japan	79.00	40	382.00	39	461.00	39	56.25	36	517.25
DNF	Ralf Ehrenbrink	Uncle Todd	West Germany	66.20	24	39.60	12	105.80	12	did not finish		
DNF	Dino Costantini	Boardmans Beauty	Italy	67.80	27	62.00	19	129.80	19	did not finish		
DNF	Marges Knighton	Enterprise	New Zealand	74.60	36	90.00	24	164.60	24	did not finish		
DNF	Ann Sutton	Tarzan	United States	57.20	14	did not finish		did not advance				
DNF	Ranieri Campello	Cotton End	Italy	57.80	16	did not finish		did not advance				
DNF	Thomas Wilson	Personal Touch	Puerto Rico	59.20	18	did not finish		did not advance				
DNF	Karen Lende	The Optimist	United States	64.20	21	did not finish		did not advance				
DNF	Hiroshi Watanabe	Yakumo Masonori	Japan	67.20	25	did not finish		did not advance				
DNF	Kim Hyeong-chil	Casson Road	South Korea	72.40	32	did not finish		did not advance				
DNF	Jo Tudor	Sparrow Hawk	Canada	75.60	37	did not finish		did not advance				
DNF	Mark Phillips	Cartier	Great Britain	78.20	39	did not finish		did not advance				
DNF	John Watson	Tullineaskey	Ireland	85.40	42	did not finish		did not advance				
DNF	Carol Ann Blackman	Sneak Preview	Bermuda	92.60	47	did not finish		did not advance				
DNF	Hisashi Wakahara	Lord Waterford	Japan	96.40	48	did not finish		did not advance				
