= Great Britain at the 1984 Summer Olympics =

- Flag of the United Kingdom
- IOC code: GBR
- NOC: British Olympic Association

in Los Angeles
- Competitors: 337 (229 men and 108 women) in 20 sports
- Flag bearers: Lucinda Green (opening); Sebastian Coe (closing)
- Medals Ranked 11th: Gold 5 Silver 11 Bronze 21 Total 37

Summer Olympics appearances (overview)
- 1896; 1900; 1904; 1908; 1912; 1920; 1924; 1928; 1932; 1936; 1948; 1952; 1956; 1960; 1964; 1968; 1972; 1976; 1980; 1984; 1988; 1992; 1996; 2000; 2004; 2008; 2012; 2016; 2020; 2024; 2028

Other related appearances
- 1906 Intercalated Games

Great Britain, represented by the British Olympic Association (BOA), competed at the 1984 Summer Olympics in Los Angeles, United States. British athletes have competed in every Summer Olympic Games. 337 competitors, 229 men and 108 women, took part in 190 events in 20 sports.

The British team won a total of 37 medals, including five golds, this was Britain's largest total medal haul since 1920, and would not be surpassed until 2008, however this was due in part to the Soviet-led boycott of the 1984 Olympics, which meant that Eastern Bloc competitors were not present. Great Britain sent a reserve team to the Soviet organised Friendship Games, dubbed the "alternative Olympics" the same year.

== Medallists ==
Medals by discipline
Discipline	Gold medal	Silver medal	Bronze medal	Total
Athletics	3	7	6	16
Shooting	1	0	3	4
Rowing	1	0	0	1
Equestrian	0	2	1	3
Swimming	0	1	4	5
Judo	0	1	2	3
Boxing	0	0	1	1
Field hockey	0	0	1	1
Sailing	0	0	1	1
Weightlifting	0	0	1	1
Wrestling	0	0	1	1
Total	5	11	21	37

Medal	Name	Sport	Event	Date
Gold	Malcolm Cooper	Shooting	Men's 50 metre rifle three positions	1 August
Gold	Richard Budgett; Martin Cross; Adrian Ellison; Andy Holmes; Steven Redgrave	Rowing	Men's coxed four	5 August
Gold	Tessa Sanderson	Athletics	Women's javelin throw	6 August
Gold	Daley Thompson	Athletics	Men's decathlon	9 August
Gold	Sebastian Coe	Athletics	Men's 1500 metres	11 August
Silver	Sarah Hardcastle	Swimming	Women's 400 metre freestyle	31 July
Silver	Diana Clapham; Virginia Holgate; Lucinda Prior-Palmer-Green; Ian Stark	Equestrian	Team eventing	3 August
Silver	Dave Ottley	Athletics	Men's javelin throw	5 August
Silver	Sebastian Coe	Athletics	Men's 800 metres	6 August
Silver	Mike McLeod	Athletics	Men's 10,000 metres	6 August
Silver	Tim Grubb; Steven Smith; John Whitaker; Michael Whitaker	Equestrian	Team jumping	7 August
Silver	Neil Adams	Judo	Men's 78 kg	7 August
Silver	Shirley Strong	Athletics	Women's 100 metres hurdles	10 August
Silver	Wendy Sly	Athletics	Women's 3000 metres	10 August
Silver	Kriss Akabusi; Todd Bennett; Phil Brown; Garry Cook	Athletics	Men's 4 × 400 metres relay	11 August
Silver	Steve Cram	Athletics	Men's 1500 metres	11 August
Bronze	Michael Sullivan	Shooting	Men's 50 metre rifle prone	30 July
Bronze	Andrew Astbury; Neil Cochran; Paul Easter; Paul Howe	Swimming	Men's 4 × 200 metre freestyle relay	30 July
Bronze	June Croft	Swimming	Women's 400 metre freestyle	31 July
Bronze	Alister Allan	Shooting	Men's 50 metre rifle three positions	1 August
Bronze	Virginia Holgate	Equestrian	Individual eventing	3 August
Bronze	Barry Dagger	Shooting	Men's 10 metre air rifle	3 August
Bronze	Sarah Hardcastle	Swimming	Women's 800 metre freestyle	3 August
Bronze	Neil Cochran	Swimming	Men's 200 metre individual medley	4 August
Bronze	Keith Connor	Athletics	Men's triple jump	4 August
Bronze	Neil Eckersley	Judo	Men's 60 kg	4 August
Bronze	David Mercer	Weightlifting	Men's 90 kg	5 August
Bronze	Kathy Cook	Athletics	Women's 400 metres	6 August
Bronze	Fatima Whitbread	Athletics	Women's javelin throw	6 August
Bronze	Kerrith Brown	Judo	Men's 71 kg	6 August
Bronze	Peter Allam; Jonathan Richards	Sailing	Flying Dutchman	8 August
Bronze	Sue Hearnshaw	Athletics	Women's long jump	9 August
Bronze	Robert Wells	Boxing	Men's super heavyweight	9 August
Bronze	Noel Loban	Wrestling	Men's freestyle 90 kg	9 August
Bronze	Great Britain men's national field hockey team: Ian Taylor; Stephen Martin; Paul Barber; Bob Cattrall; Jon Potter; Richard Dodds; Billy McConnell; Norman Hughes; David Westcott; Richard Leman; Steve Batchelor; Sean Kerly; James Duthie; Kulbir Bhaura; Mark Precious; Veryan Pappin	Field hockey	Men's tournament	11 August
Bronze	Beverley Callender; Kathy Cook; Simmone Jacobs; Heather Oakes	Athletics	Women's 4 × 100 metres relay	11 August
Bronze	Charlie Spedding	Athletics	Men's marathon	12 August

== Archery ==
In the fourth appearance by Great Britain in modern Olympic archery, three men and three women represented the country. The women's scores were separated by only 10 points, as the three placed consecutively in the final ranking.

Women's Individual Competition:

- Eileen Robinson - 2408 points (→ 29th place)
- Angela Goodall - 2401 points (→ 30th place)
- Susan Wilcox - 2398 points (→ 31st place)

Men's Individual Competition:

- Steven Hallard - 2473 points (→ 21st place)
- Peter Gillam - 2435 points (→ 30th place)
- Richard Priestman - 2339 points (→ 48th place)

== Athletics ==
Men's Competition

Men's 100 metres

- Mike McFarlane

- Final — 10.27 (→ 5th place)

- Donovan Reid

- Final — 10.32 (→ 7th place)

Men's 200 metres

- Ade Mafe

- Heat — 21.02
- Quarterfinals — 20.55
- Semifinals — 20.54
- Final — 20.98 (→ 8th place)

Men's 400 metres

- Kriss Akabusi

- Heat — 45.64
- Quarterfinals — 45.43
- Semifinals — 45.69 (→ did not advance)

- Philip Brown

- Heat — 46.26
- Quarterfinals — 46.63 (→ did not advance)

- Todd Bennett

- Heat — 46.09
- Quarterfinals — 45.51 (→ did not advance)

Men's 5,000 metres

- Tim Hutchings

- Heat — 13:46.01
- Semifinals — 13:28.60
- Final — 13:11.50 (→ 4th place)

- Eamonn Martin

- Heat — 13:46.16
- Semifinals — 13:41.70
- Final — 13:53.34 (→ 13th place)

- David Moorcroft

- Heat — 13:51.40
- Semifinals — 13:28.44
- Final — 14:16.61 (→ 14th place)

Men's 10,000 metres

- Mike McLeod

- Qualifying Heat — 28:24.92
- Final — 28:06.22 (→ Silver Medal)

- Steve Jones

- Qualifying Heat — 28:15.22
- Final — 28:28.08 (→ 8th place)

- Nick Rose

- Qualifying Heat — 28:31.13
- Final — 28:31.73 (→ 12th place)

Men's Marathon

- Charlie Spedding

- Final — 2:09:58 (→ Bronze Medal)

- Hugh Jones

- Final — 2:13:57 (→ 12th place)

- Geoff Smith

- Final — did not finish (→ no ranking)

Men's High Jump

- Geoff Parsons

- Qualification — 2.21 m (→ did not advance)

- Mark Naylor

- Qualification — no mark (→ did not advance)

Men's triple jump

- Keith Connor

- Final — 16.87 m (→ Bronze Medal)

- Eric McCalla

- Final — 16.66 m (→ 8th place)

Men's Javelin Throw

- David Ottley

- Qualification — 85.68 m
- Final — 85.74 m (→ Silver Medal)

- Roald Bradstock

- Qualification — 83.06 m
- Final — 81.22 m (→ 7th place)

Men's Hammer Throw

- Robert Weir

- Qualification — 73.04 m
- Final — 72.62 m (→ 8th place)

- Martin Girvan

- Qualification — 72.66 m
- Final — 72.32 m (→ 9th place)

- Matthew Mileham

- Qualification — 71.80 m
- Final — no mark (→ no ranking)

Men's Pole Vault

- Jeff Gutteridge

- Qualifying Round — 5.30 m
- Final — 5.10 m (→ 11th place)

- Keith Stock

- Qualifying Round — 5.20 m (→ did not advance)

Men's Decathlon

- Daley Thompson

- Final Result — 8797 points (→ Gold Medal)

- Brad McStravick

- Final Result — 7890 points (→ 11th place)

- Colin Boreham

- Final Result — 7485 points (→ 20th place)

Men's 20 km Walk

- Philip Vesty

- Final — 1:27:28 (→ 13th place)

- Ian McCombie

- Final — 1:28:53 (→ 19th place)

- Steve Barry

- Final — 1:30:46 (→ 24th place)

Men's 50 km Walk

- Chris Maddocks

- Final — 4:26:33 (→ 16th place)

Women's Competition

Women's 1,500 metres

- Christine Benning

- Heat — 4:10.48
- Final — 4:04.70 (→ 5th place)

- Christina Boxer

- Heat — 4:07.40
- Final — 4:05.53 (→ 6th place)

- Lynne MacDougall

- Heat — 4:09.08
- Final — 4:10.58 (→ 11th place)

Women's 3,000 metres

- Wendy Sly

- Heat — 8:58.66
- Final — 8:39.47 (→ Silver Medal)

- Zola Budd

- Heat — 8:44.62
- Final — 8:48.80 (→ 7th place)

- Jane Furniss

- Heat — 8:44.62 (→ did not advance)

Women's Marathon

- Priscilla Welch

- Final — 2:28:54 (→ 6th place)

- Joyce Smith

- Final — 2:32:48 (→ 11th place)

- Sarah Rowell

- Final — 2:34:08 (→ 14th place)

Women's 400 m Hurdles

- Susan Morley

- Heat — 58.71
- Semifinal — 56.67 (→ did not advance)

- Gladys Taylor

- Heat — 57.64
- Semifinal — 56.72 (→ did not advance)

Women's High Jump

- Diana Elliott

- Qualification — 1.90 m
- Final — 1.88 m (→ 9th place)

- Judy Simpson

- Qualification — 1.84 m (→ did not advance, 19th place)

Women's Long Jump

- Sue Hearnshaw

- Qualification — 6.64 m
- Final — 6.80 m (→ Bronze Medal)

Women's Discus Throw

- Meg Ritchie

- Qualification — 56.00 m
- Final — 62.58 m (→ 5th place)

- Venissa Head

- Qualification — 55.24 m
- Final — 58.18 m (→ 7th place)

Women's Shot Put

- Judy Oakes

- Final — 18.14 m (→ 4th place)

- Venissa Head

- Final — 17.90 m (→ 6th place)

Women's Javelin Throw

- Tessa Sanderson

- Qualification — 61.58 m
- Final — 69.56 m (→ Gold Medal)

- Fatima Whitbread

- Qualification — 65.30 m
- Final — 67.14 m (→ Bronze Medal)

- Sharon Gibson

- Qualification — 60.88 m
- Final — 59.66 m (→ 9th place)

Women's Heptathlon

- Judy Simpson

- Final Result — 6280 points (→ 5th place)

- Kim Hagger

- Final Result — 6127 points (→ 8th place)

== Boxing ==
Athlete	Event	First Round	Second Round	Third Round	Quarterfinals	Semifinals	Final	
Athlete	Event	Opposition Result	Opposition Result	Opposition Result	Opposition Result	Opposition Result	Opposition Result	Rank
John Lyon	Light flyweight	Akomi (SUD); W 5-0	Ben-Haim (ISR); W 5-0	—N/a	Gonzales (USA); L 1-4	Did not advance		—N/a
Pat Clinton	Flyweight	Makhanya (SWZ); W 5-0	Redzepovski (YUG); L KO	—N/a	Did not advance			—N/a
John Hyland	Bantamweight	Bye	Moon S-K (KOR); L AB	—N/a	Did not advance			—N/a
Kevin Taylor	Featherweight	Bye	Magagula (SWZ); W 5-0	Park H-O (KOR); L 2-3	Did not advance			—N/a
Alex Dickson	Lightweight	Bye	Ollo (GAB); W 5-0	Ortiz (PUR); L KO	Did not advance			—N/a
David Griffiths	Light welterweight	Bye	Charleswell (ISV); W 5-0	Umponmaha (THA); L 1-4	Did not advance			—N/a
Mickey Hughes	Welterweight	Rasamimanana (MAD); W 5-0	Obreja (ROU); L 0-5	Did not advance				—N/a
Rod Douglas	Light middleweight	Bye	Okumu (KEN); W 4-1	Ogiwara (JPN); W 4-1	O'Sullivan (CAN); L 0-5	Did not advance		—N/a
Brian Schumacher	Middleweight	Bye	Hill (USA); L 0-5	—N/a	Did not advance			—N/a
Tony Wilson	Light heavyweight	Bye	Oviedo (ARG); W RSC	—N/a	Moussa (ALG); L 0-5	Did not advance		—N/a
Doug Young	Heavyweight	Bye	Stefanopoulos (GRE); L KO	—N/a	Did not advance			—N/a
Robert Wells	Super heavyweight	Bye	—N/a		Pulu (TGA); W KO	Damiani (ITA); L RSC	Did not advance	3rd place, bronze medalist(s)

== Cycling ==
Sixteen cyclists represented Great Britain in 1984.

Men's individual road race

- Mark Bell — did not finish (→ no ranking)
- Neil Martin — did not finish (→ no ranking)
- Peter Sanders — did not finish (→ no ranking)
- Darryl Webster — did not finish (→ no ranking)

Team time trial

- Steven Poulter
- Keith Reynolds
- Peter Sanders
- Darryl Webster

Sprint

- Mark Barry

1000m time trial

- Mark Barry

Individual pursuit

- Shaun Wallace
- Steve Bent

Team pursuit

- Steve Bent
- Paul Curran
- Mark Noble
- Adrian Timmis

Points race

- Shaun Wallace
- Paul Curran

Women's individual road race

- Catherine Swinnerton — 2:13:28 (→ 13th place)
- Linda Gornall — 2:13:28 (→ 17th place)
- Maria Blower — 2:22:03 (→ 29th place)
- Muriel Sharp — 2:22:03 (→ 30th place)

== Diving ==
Men's 3m Springboard

- Christopher Snode

- Preliminary Round — 592.68
- Final — 609.51 (→ 5th place)

- Nigel Stanton

- Preliminary Round — 521.61 (→ did not advance, 15th place)

== Fencing ==
20 fencers, 15 men and 5 women, represented Great Britain in 1984.

Men's foil

- Bill Gosbee
- Pierre Harper
- Nick Bell

Men's team foil

- Bill Gosbee, Pierre Harper, Nick Bell, Rob Bruniges, Graham Paul

Men's épée

- Steven Paul
- John Llewellyn
- Jonathan Stanbury

Men's team épée

- Ralph Johnson, John Llewellyn, Neal Mallett, Steven Paul, Jonathan Stanbury

Men's sabre

- Mark Slade
- Richard Cohen
- John Zarno

Men's team sabre

- Richard Cohen, Paul Klenerman, Jim Philbin, Mark Slade, John Zarno

Women's foil

- Linda Ann Martin
- Liz Thurley
- Fiona McIntosh

Women's team foil

- Ann Brannon, Linda Ann Martin, Fiona McIntosh, Liz Thurley, Katie Arup

== Field hockey ==
Event	Group Phase					Semifinals	Medal Final	
Event	Opposition Result	Opposition Result	Opposition Result	Opposition Result	Opposition Result	Opposition Result	Opposition Result	Rank
Men's tournament	Kenya; 2-1	Canada; 3-1	New Zealand; 1-0	Netherlands; 4-3	Pakistan; 0-0	West Germany; 0-1	Australia; 3-2	3rd place, bronze medalist(s)

- Team roster

- (1.) Ian Taylor (gk)
- (2.) Veryan Pappin (gk)
- (3.) Stephen Martin
- (4.) Paul Barber
- (5.) Robert Cattrall
- (6.) Jon Potter
- (7.) Richard Dodds
- (8.) Billy McConnell
- (9.) Norman Hughes
- (10.) David Westcott (c)
- (11.) Richard Leman
- (12.) Stephen Batchelor
- (13.) Sean Kerly
- (14.) James Duthie
- (15.) Kulbir Bhaura
- (16.) Mark Precious

- Head coach: David Whitaker

== Modern pentathlon ==
Three male pentathletes represented Great Britain in 1984.

Individual

- Richard Phelps
- Michael Mumford
- Stephen Sowerby

Team

- Richard Phelps
- Michael Mumford
- Stephen Sowerby

== Rowing ==
Men's coxless pair

- John Beattie, Richard Stanhope

- (→ 12th place)

Men's coxed pair

- Adrian Genziani, Bill Lang, Alan Inns

- (→ 8th place)

Men's coxless four

- Jonathan Clift, John Garrett, Martin Knight, John Bland

- (→ 9th place)

Men's coxed four

- Richard Budgett, Martin Cross, Andy Holmes, Steve Redgrave, Adrian Ellison

- (→ Gold)

Men's eight

- Clive Roberts, Adam Clift, Salih Hassan, Chris Mahoney, Duncan McDougall, Malcolm McGowan, John Pritchard, Allan Whitwell, Colin Moynihan

- (→ 5th place)

Women's single scull

- Beryl Mitchell

- (→ 6th place)

Women's double scull

- Sally Bloomfield, Nonie Ray

- (→ 8th place)

Women's coxless pair

- Kate Panter, Ruth Howe

- (→ 6th place)

Women's coxed four

- Tessa Millar, Jean Genchi, Joanna Toch, Katie Ball, Kathy Talbot

- (→ 7th place)

Women's eight

- Astrid Ayling, Ann Callaway, Alexa Forbes, Gillian Hodges, Kate Holroyd, Belinda Holmes, Sarah Hunter-Jones, Kate McNicol, Sue Bailey

- (→ 5th place)

== Swimming ==
Men's Competition

Men's 100 m Freestyle

- David Lowe

- Heat — 51.68
- B-Final — 51.48 (→ 11th place)

- Paul Easter

- Heat — 51.83 (→ did not advance, 21st place)

Men's 200 m Freestyle

- Paul Easter

- Heat — 1:51.80
- B-Final — 1:51.70 (→ 9th place)

- Andrew Astbury

- Heat — 1:52.01
- B-Final — 1:53.02 (→ 15th place)

Men's 400 m Freestyle

- Andrew Astbury

- Heat — 3:58.41
- B-Final — 3:58.14 (→ 14th place)

- Paul Howe

- Heat — 4:04.07 (→ did not advance, 25th place)

Men's 1500 m Freestyle

- David Stacey

- Heat — 15:30.10 (→ did not advance, 12th place)

- Stuart Willmott

- Heat — 15:57.79 (→ did not advance, 21st place)

Men's 100 m Backstroke

- Neil Harper

- Heat — 58.50 (→ did not advance, 17th place)

- Ian Collins

- Heat — 1:00.08 (→ did not advance, 28th place)

Men's 200 m Backstroke

- Neil Cochran

- Heat — 2:05.58
- B-Final — 2:05.72 (→ 14th place)

- Neil Harper

- Heat — 2:09.48 (→ did not advance, 24th place)

Men's 100 m Breaststroke

- Adrian Moorhouse

- Heat — 1:04.06
- Final — 1:03.25 (→ 4th place)

- Iain Cambell

- Heat — 1:04.81
- B-Final — 1:05.02 (→ 14th place)

Men's 200 m Breaststroke

- Adrian Moorhouse

- Heat — 2:19.83
- B-Final — 2:18.83 (→ 9th place)

- Iain Cambell

- Heat — 2:20.78
- B-Final — 2:20.62 (→ 11th place)

Men's 100 m Butterfly

- Andrew Jameson

- Heat — 54.49
- Final — 54.28 (→ 5th place)

- Ian Collins

- Heat — 56.41 (→ did not advance, 22nd place)

Men's 200 m Butterfly

- Nick Hodgson

- Heat — 2:01.64
- B-Final — 2:01.24 (→ 11th place)

- Philip Hubble

- Heat — 2:02.76
- B-Final — 2:03.06 (→ 16th place)

Men's 200 m Individual Medley

- Neil Cochran

- Heat — 2:05.39
- Final — 2:04.38 (→ Bronze Medal)

- Robin Brew

- Heat — 2:04.13
- Final — 2:04.52 (→ 4th place)

Men's 400 m Individual Medley

- Stephen Poulter

- Heat — 4:25.38
- Final — 4:25.80 (→ 7th place)

- Stuart Willmott

- Heat — 4:32.90
- B-Final — 4:31.10 (→ 15th place)

Men's 4 × 100 m Freestyle Relay

- David Lowe, Roland Lee, Paul Easter, and Richard Burrell

- Heat — 3:24.59
- Final — 3:23.61 (→ 5th place)

Men's 4 × 200 m Freestyle Relay

- Neil Cochran, Paul Easter, Paul Howe, and Andrew Astbury

- Heat — 7:26.83
- Final — 7:24.78 (→ Bronze Medal)

Men's 4 × 100 m Medley Relay

- Neil Harper, Adrian Moorhouse, Andy Jameson, and David Lowe

- Heat — 3:49.86

- Neil Harper, Adrian Moorhouse, Andy Jameson, and Richard Burrell

- Final — 3:47.39 (→ 6th place)

Women's Competition

Women's 100 m Freestyle

- June Croft

- Heat — 57.12
- Final — 57.11 (→ 7th place)

- Nicola Fibbens

- Heat — 57.80
- B-Final — 57.36 (→ 11th place)

Women's 200 m Freestyle

- June Croft

- Heat — 2:01.05
- Final — 2:00.64 (→ 6th place)

- Annabelle Cripps

- Heat — 2:04.44
- B-Final — 2:04.90 (→ 15th place)

Women's 400 m Freestyle

- Sarah Hardcastle

- Heat — 4:11.55
- Final — 4:10.27 (→ Silver Medal)

- June Croft

- Heat — 4:15.51
- Final — 4:11.49 (→ Bronze Medal)

Women's 800 m Freestyle

- Sarah Hardcastle

- Heat — 8:35.87
- Final — 8:32.60 (→ Bronze Medal)

- Annabelle Cripps

- Heat — 8:58.09 (→ did not advance, 14th place)

Women's 100 m Backstroke

- Beverley Rose

- Heat — 1:03.61
- Final — 1:04.16 (→ 7th place)

- Catherine White

- Heat — 1:05.03
- B-Final — 1:04.99 (→ 13th place)

Women's 200 m Backstroke

- Catherine White

- Heat — 2:18.02
- B-Final — 2:17.63 (→ 10th place)

- Katherine Read

- Heat — 2:18.92
- B-Final — 2:18.33 (→ 11th place)

Women's 200 m Butterfly

- Samantha Purvis

- Heat — 2:11.97
- Final — 2.12.33 (→ 5th place)

- Ann Osgerby

- Heat — 2:16.31
- B-Final — 2:19.10 (→ 16th place)

Women's 200 m Individual Medley

- Gaynor Stanley

- Heat — 2:24.94
- B-Final — 2:21.71 (→ 13th place)

- Zara Long

- Heat — 2:23.89
- B-Final — 2:22.25 (→ 14th place)

Women's 400 m Individual Medley

- Gaynor Stanley

- Heat — 4:53.70
- Final — 4:52.83 (→ 7th place)

- Sarah Hardcastle

- Heat — 4:55.78
- B-Final — 4:51.55 (→ 9th place)

Women's 4 × 100 m Freestyle Relay

- Annabelle Cripps, Nicola Fibbens, Debra Gore, and June Croft

- Heat — 3:51.47
- Final — 3:50.12 (→ 6th place)

Women's 4 × 100 m Medley Relay

- Beverley Rose, Jean Hill, Nicola Fibbens, and June Croft

- Heat — 4:16.83
- Final — 4:14.05 (→ 4th place)
