= Ireland at the 1984 Summer Olympics =

- IOC code: IRL
- NOC: Olympic Federation of Ireland
- Website: olympics.ie

in Los Angeles
- Competitors: 42 (28 men and 13 women) in 10 sports
- Flag bearer: Gerry Mullins
- Medals Ranked 33rd: Gold 0 Silver 1 Bronze 0 Total 1

Summer Olympics appearances (overview)
- 1924; 1928; 1932; 1936; 1948; 1952; 1956; 1960; 1964; 1968; 1972; 1976; 1980; 1984; 1988; 1992; 1996; 2000; 2004; 2008; 2012; 2016; 2020; 2024

Other related appearances
- Great Britain (1896–1920)

Ireland competed at the 1984 Summer Olympics in Los Angeles, It went from July 28, 1984, to August 12, 1984 United States. 42 competitors, 28 men and 13 women, took part in 35 events in 10 sports.

== Medalists ==
Medal	Name	Sport	Event	Date
Silver	John Treacy	Athletics	Men's marathon	12 August

== Archery ==
In Ireland's third appearance in archery competition at the Olympics, the nation was represented by two women. This included veteran Hazel Greene.

Women's Individual Competition:

- Hazel Greene — 2440 points (→ 20th place)
- Mary Vaughan — 2298 points (→ 39th place)

== Athletics ==
=== Track ===
Name	Event	Heat		Semifinal		Final	
Name	Event	Time	Rank	Time	Rank	Time	Rank
Marcus O'Sullivan	Men's 800m	1:46.85	5	Did Not Avdance			
Marcus O'Sullivan	Men's 1500m	3:49.65	3 Q	3:39.40	9	Did Not Advance	
Paul Donovan	Men's 1500m	3:45.70	4	Did Not Advance			
Frank O'Mara	Men's 1500m	3:41.76	4	Did Not Advance			
Ray Flynn	Men's 5000m	13:46.84	4 Q	13:40.74	4 Q	13:34.50	11
John Treacy	Men's 10,000m	28:18.13	5 Q	—N/a		28:28.68	9
Liam O'Brien	Men's 3000m Steeplechase	8:31.89	8 q	8:34.90	11	Did Not Advance	
John Treacy	Men's Marathon	—N/a				2:09:56	2nd place, silver medalist(s)
Jerry Kiernan	Men's Marathon	—N/a				2:12:20	9
Dick Hooper	Men's Marathon	—N/a				2:24:41	51
Caroline O'Shea	Women's 800m	2:03.60	2 Q	2:02.70	4 Q	2:00.77	8
Roisin Smyth	Women's 3000m	9:01.69	8	—N/a		Did Not Advance	
Monica Joyce	Women's 3000m	8:54.34	5	—N/a		Did Not Advance	
Mary Parr	Women's 400m Hurdles	1:01.86	7	Did Not Avdance			
Regina Joyce	Women's Marathon	—N/a				2:37:57	23
Carey May	Women's Marathon	—N/a				2:41:27	28

=== Field ===
Name	Event	Qualification		Final	
Name	Event	Mark	Rank	Mark	Rank
Declan Hegarty	Men's Hammer Throw	70.56	17	Did Not Advance	
Conor McCullough	Men's Hammer Throw	65.56	22	Did Not Advance	
Patricia Walsh	Women's Discus Throw	54.42	10 Q	55.38	9

== Boxing ==
Men's Light Flyweight (– 48 kg)

- Gerard Hawkins

- First Round — Bye
- Second Round — Lost to Salvatore Todisco (ITA), 0:5

Men's Bantamweight (– 54 kg)

- Phillip Sutcliffe

- First Round — Bye
- Second Round — Lost to Maurizio Stecca (ITA), 0:5

== Canoeing ==
Athlete	Event	Heat		Repechage		Semifinal		Final	
Athlete	Event	Time	Rank	Time	Rank	Time	Rank	Time	Rank
Ian Pringle	K-1 500m	2:01.10	5 R	1:57.92	4 SF	1:56.06	6	Did not Advance	
Ian Pringle	K-1 1000 m	4:09.21	5 R	4:07.34	3 SF	4:02.81	5	Did not Advance	

== Cycling ==
Five cyclists represented Ireland in 1984.

Individual road race

- Martin Earley – 19th
- Paul Kimmage – 27th
- Gary Thomson – 39th
- Séamus Downey – 43rd

Team time trial – 16th

- Philip Cassidy
- Martin Earley
- Paul Kimmage
- Gary Thomson

== Equestrianism ==
=== Eventing ===
Athlete	Horse	Event	Dressage	Cross-country	Jumping	Total	
Athlete	Horse	Event	Faults	Faults	Faults	Faults	Rank
Sarah Gordon	Rathkenny	Individual	74.20	20.00	5.00	99.20	23
David Foster	Aughatore	Individual	77.20	42.00	0.75	119.95	27
Fiona Wentges	Ballylusky	Individual	72.60	56.80	15.00	144.40	29
Margaret Tollerton	Ipi Tombi	Individual	87.80	DNF	DNS	DNF	DNF
Sarah Gordon David Foster Fiona Wentges Margaret Tollerton	as above	Team	224.00	118.80	20.75	363.55	9

=== Jumping ===
Athlete	Horse	Event	Round 1		Round 2		Total	
Athlete	Horse	Event	Faults	Rank	Faults	Rank	Faults	Rank
Gerry Mullins	Ruckbarton	Individual	16.25	28	Did Not Advance		16.25	28

== Judo ==
Athlete	Event	Round of 32	Round of 16	Quarterfinal	Semifinal	Repechage 1	Repechage 2	Final / BM	
Athlete	Event	Opposition Result	Opposition Result	Opposition Result	Opposition Result	Opposition Result	Opposition Result	Opposition Result	Rank
Kieran Foley	–71 kg	(South Korea) Ahn Byeong-keun L	Did not Advance			(El Salvador) Juan Vargas W	(Japan) Hidetoshi Nakanishi L	Did not Advance	=7

== Sailing ==
- Bill O'Hara – Finn 13th

== Shooting ==
Athlete	Event	Score	Rank
Roy McGowan	Trap	169	53
Albert Thompson	Skeet	184	T41

== Swimming ==
Women

Athlete	Event	Heat		Semifinal		Final	
Athlete	Event	Time	Rank	Time	Rank	Time	Rank
Carol-Ann Heavey	100 m freestyle	1:01.34	33	—N/a		Did not advance	
Carol-Ann Heavey	200 m freestyle	2:07.75	20	—N/a		Did not advance	
Carol-Ann Heavey	400 m freestyle	4:36.07	22	—N/a		Did not advance	
Julie Parkes	100 m butterfly	1:06.20	27	—N/a		Did not advance	
Julie Parkes	200 m butterfly	2:20.85	21	—N/a		Did not advance	
