= Equestrian at the 1988 Summer Olympics – Team eventing =

Team eventing at the Games of the XXIV Olympiad
- Venue: Seoul Equestrian Park; Wondang Ranch
- Date: 19–22 September
- Competitors: 30 from 10 nations

Medalists
1st place, gold medalist(s)		Claus Erhorn; Matthias Baumann; Thies Kaspareit; Ralf Ehrenbrink	West Germany
2nd place, silver medalist(s)		Mark Phillips; Karen Straker; Virginia Leng; Ian Stark	Great Britain
3rd place, bronze medalist(s)		Mark Todd; Margaret Knighton; Andrew Bennie; Tinks Pottinger	New Zealand

The team eventing competition was one of six equestrian events on the Equestrian at the 1988 Summer Olympics programme. Dressage and stadium jumping portions of the competition were held at the Seoul Equestrian Park in Seoul, the endurance stage was held at Wondang Ranch in Goyang.

The competition was split into three phases:

1. Dressage (22–23 September)
  Riders performed the dressage test.
2. Endurance (24 September)
  Riders tackled roads and tracks, steeplechase and cross-country portions.
3. Jumping (25 September)
  Riders jumped at the show jumping course.

Scores from the top 3 finishing horse and rider pairs for each nation were summed to give a team score. Nations with fewer than 3 pairs finishing were not given a final score.

== Results ==
Rank	Nation	Individual results						Team score
Rank	Nation	Rider	Horse	Dressage	Endurance	Jumping	Total	Team score
1st place, gold medalist(s)	West Germany	Claus Erhorn	Justyn Thyme	39.60	16.00	6.75	62.35	229.95
1st place, gold medalist(s)	West Germany	Matthias Baumann	Shamrock II	50.60	13.20	5.00	68.80	229.95
1st place, gold medalist(s)	West Germany	Thies Kaspareit	Sherry 42	46.80	38.00	10.00	94.80	229.95
1st place, gold medalist(s)	West Germany	Ralf Ehrenbrink	Uncle Todd	66.20	39.60	DSQ	EL	229.95
2nd place, silver medalist(s)	Great Britain	Ian Stark	Sir Wattie	50.00	2.80	0.00	52.80	256.80
2nd place, silver medalist(s)	Great Britain	Virginia Leng	Master Craftsman	43.20	8.80	10.00	62.00	256.80
2nd place, silver medalist(s)	Great Britain	Karen Straker	Get Smart	53.20	88.80	0.00	142.00	256.80
2nd place, silver medalist(s)	Great Britain	Mark Phillips	Cartier	78.20	DNF	EL	EL	256.80
3rd place, bronze medalist(s)	New Zealand	Mark Todd	Charisma	37.60	0.00	5.00	42.60	271.20
3rd place, bronze medalist(s)	New Zealand	Tinks Pottinger	Volunteer	65.80	0.00	0.00	65.80	271.20
3rd place, bronze medalist(s)	New Zealand	Andrew Bennie	Grayshott	52.20	85.60	25.00	162.80	271.20
3rd place, bronze medalist(s)	New Zealand	Marges Knighton	Enterprise	74.60	90.00	DSQ	EL	271.20
4	Poland	Bogusław Jarecki	Niewiaza	56.60	44.80	10.00	111.40	389.60
4	Poland	Krzysztof Rogowski	Alkierz	80.20	29.60	5.00	114.80	389.60
4	Poland	Krzysztof Rafalak	Dzwinograd	72.40	86.00	5.00	163.40	389.60
4	Poland	Eugeniusz Koczorski	Idrys	90.00	170.80	16.50	~~277.30~~	389.60
5	Australia	Andrew Hoy	Kiwi	57.00	32.00	0.00	89.00	457.60
5	Australia	Scott Keach	Trade Commissioner	67.60	104.00	5.00	176.60	457.60
5	Australia	David Green	Shannagh	56.00	136.00	0.00	192.00	457.60
5	Australia	Barry Roycroft	Last Tango	85.40	100.40	10.00	~~195.80~~	457.60
6	France	Jean Teulère	Mohican V	57.60	6.40	5.00	69.00	498.80
6	France	Vincent Berthet	Jet Crub	59.40	142.80	0.00	202.20	498.80
6	France	Pascal Morvillers	Frangin III	64.60	158.00	55.00	227.60	498.80
6	France	Marie-Christine Duroy	Harley	60.00	168.80	5.00	~~233.80~~	498.80
7	South Korea	Choi Myeong-jin	Snuffler	69.40	60.40	0.75	130.55	740.15
7	South Korea	Park Dong-ju	Aqaba Legend A	99.80	117.20	10.00	227.00	740.15
7	South Korea	Park So-un	Moisson d'Avril	86.60	250.00	46.00	382.60	740.15
7	South Korea	Kim Hyeong-chil	Casson Road	72.40	DNF	EL	EL	740.15
–	Italy	Bartolo Ambrosione	Phoenix	58.80	47.60	1.50	107.90	EL
–	Italy	Francesco Girardi	Moreado	70.80	94.80	0.75	166.35	EL
–	Italy	Dino Costantini	Boardmans Beauty	67.80	62.00	DSQ	EL	EL
–	Italy	Ranieri Campello	Cotton End	57.80	DNF	EL	EL	EL
–	United States	Phyllis Dawson	Albany II	54.60	40.00	5.00	99.60	EL
–	United States	Bruce Davidson	Dr. Peaches	50.40	76.40	15.00	141.80	EL
–	United States	Ann Sutton	Tarzan	57.20	DNF	EL	EL	EL
–	United States	Karen Lende	The Optimist	64.20	EL	EL	EL	EL
–	Japan	Eiki Miyazaki	Scrooge	97.20	94.40	10.00	201.60	EL
–	Japan	Kazuhiro Iwatani	Copen Hagen V	79.00	382.00	56.25	517.25	EL
–	Japan	Hiroshi Watanabe	Yakumo Masonori	67.20	EL	EL	EL	EL
–	Japan	Hisashi Wakahara	Lord Waterford	96.40	DNF	EL	EL	EL
