= Tarvis (disambiguation) =

Tarvis is the German and Friulian name for Tarvisio, a comune in Udine, Italy.

Tarvis may also refer to:

- Battle of Tarvis (disambiguation)
- Laine Tarvis (1937–2024), Estonian politician
- Tarvis Simms, (born 1971), American boxer
- Tarvis Williams (born 1978), American basketball player

== See also ==
- Edie Tarves (born 1961), Canadian equestrian
- Tarves, a settlement in Aberdeenshire, Scotland
