= Edie Tarves =

Canadian equestrian

Personal information
- Born: 22 November 1961 (age 64); Toronto, Ontario, Canada
- Height: 165 cm (5 ft 5 in)
- Weight: 54 kg (119 lb)
Medal record
Equestrian
Representing Canada
Pan American Games
Gold medal – first place	1991 Chatsworth	Team eventing

Edie Tarves (born 22 November 1961) is a Canadian equestrian. She competed for Canada at the 1984 Summer Olympics in individual eventing and team eventing (with Kelly Plitz, Martha Griggs and Liz Ashton). Competing for Canada at the 1991 Pan American Games, she earned a gold medal in team eventing (with Nick Holmes-Smith, Stuart Young-Black and James Smart).
