= Toia =

Toia is an Italian origin surname. People with the surname include:

- Donny Toia (born 1992), American football player
- Geremia Toia (born 1966), Italian equestrian
- Hōne Riiwi Tōia (1858–1933), Maori tribal and religious leader
- Jay Toia (born 2003), American football player
- Jim Toia, American artist and art scholar
- Luke Toia (born 1977), Australian football player
- Mase Toia Alama (1951–2022), Samoan doctor and civil servant
- Patrizia Toia (born 1950), Italian politician
