= Lara Prior-Palmer =

British equestrian

Lara Prior-Palmer (born 24 June 1994) is an athlete and writer. She is the niece of British equestrian Lucinda Green.

== Mongol Derby ==
In 2013 Prior-Palmer became the first woman to win the Mongol Derby, the world's longest horse race, as well as the youngest person ever to complete it. Her autobiography Rough Magic, recounting her experience competing in the race, was published in 2019. The memoir received positive reviews in The Washington Post and The Daily Telegraph: Sarah Moss, writing in The Guardian, stated: "It's the resistance to the obvious narratives that makes Rough Magic so appealing: the book undermines lazy women-in-the-wilderness tropes at every turn."
