= Mark Precious =

British field hockey player

Personal information
- Born: 29 August 1956 (age 69)
- Height: 176 cm (5 ft 9 in)
- Weight: 70 kg (154 lb)

Sport
- Sport: Field hockey
Senior career
Years	Team	Caps	Goals
1976–1980	Oxford University	-	-
1981–1985	Hounslow	-	-
National team
Years	Team	Caps	Goals
–	Great Britain		-
–	England		-
Medal record
Men's field hockey
Representing Great Britain
Olympic Games
Bronze medal – third place	1984 Los Angeles	Team competition

Mark Precious (born 29 August 1956) is a former field hockey player, who won the bronze medal at the 1984 Summer Olympics in Los Angeles.

== Biography ==
Precious was educate at Scarborough College and studied at University College, Oxford and was part of the Oxford University team that defeated Cambridge 7–0 in the 1976 varsity match.

Precious joined Hounslow Hockey Club after leaving University and was selected for the England team at the 1982 Men's Hockey World Cup. At the 1984 Olympic Games in Los Angeles, he represented Great Britain, where he was part of the team that won a bronze medal.
