= Thomas Wilson (equestrian) =

Puerto Rican equestrian

Personal information
- Nationality: Puerto Rican
- Born: 18 May 1962 (age 62)

Sport
- Sport: Equestrian

Thomas B. Wilson (born 18 May 1962) is a Puerto Rican equestrian. He competed in the individual eventing at the 1988 Summer Olympics.
