= Priceless (horse) =

Horse that competed at Olympic level in eventing

- Breed: Sport Horse
- Sire: Ben Faerie (Thoroughbred)
- Grandsire: Ben Hawke (Thoroughbred)
- Dam: Reckless
- Maternal grandsire: unknown
- Sex: Gelding
- Colour: Bay
- Breeder: Brendon Hill
- Owner: Ginny Holgate/Leng/Elliott

Priceless
Medal record

Equestrian

Olympic Games
Silver medal – second place	1984 Los Angeles	Three-Day Event Team
Bronze medal – third place	1984 Los Angeles	Individual Three Day Event

World Championships
Gold medal – first place	1986 Gawler	Individual eventing
Gold medal – first place	1986 Gawler	Team eventing
Gold medal – first place	1982 Luhmühlen	Team eventing

European Championships
Gold medal – first place	1981 Horsens	Team eventing
Gold medal – first place	1985 Burghley	Team eventing
Gold medal – first place	1985 Burghley	Individual eventing

Priceless was a horse ridden by British rider Virginia Leng. She competed the gelding in the sport of eventing. Priceless won four team gold medals for Britain, as well as the Badminton Horse Trials and Burghley Horse Trials.

In every three-day event in which he competed, Priceless never had a cross-country penalty (a feat considered amazing by the eventing community), and did not have a stop the whole of his career. Priceless was excellent on cross-country, being fast, careful, and a good jumper, with great form and scope. Perhaps this was the reason he was never out of the top twelve in any three-day event.

Priceless won eight medals at international championships: four team golds (1981 and 1985 European Championships and the 1982 and 1986 World Championships), one team silver (1984 Olympic Games), two individual golds (1985 European Championships and 1986 World Championships) and one individual bronze (1984 Olympic Games). He is one of the rare horses to have held both European and World team and individual titles concurrently, in addition to Cornishman V and Toytown. He is also the only horse to have won the Burghley Horse Trials twice.

After his eventing career, Priceless fox hunted with his owners, before retiring on Leng's farm. He was euthanized at the age of 28.

== Quotes about Priceless ==
"Partnerships like that usually happen once in a lifetime." Lucinda Green

"He's never stopped at a jump, which is quite remarkable. He's one of the all-time greats." Richard Meade

"He's a bit of a legend. I'd read and heard a lot about him before I ever saw him but it wasn't until the team started training together for the 1984 Olympics that I realised quite how brilliant he was. In the flesh he looks like a very large pony, and when he wasn't fit you might have wondered if he'd be capable of Three-Day eventing. Once you study him in action though, he leaves you no doubt. Throughout the team training he stood out above the rest. He did everything that bit better. He excelled in everything he did, particularly when he had an audience. He always thought he was special and he was jolly well right." Ian Stark

"On the day of the cross-country at the Los Angeles Olympics, Ginny and Priceless set off early I wanted a shot of them jumping the Crescent Oxer which I knew could be spectacular if - as Dot had told me - they took the direct route through the centre. If they had decided to choose the easy way round the side I would have missed my picture altogether. It was a gamble, especially as no one before them took the central route and a lot of the riders seemed to be making heavy weather of the course. The gloomy predictions that no one would clear seemed to have a ring of truth. Then Priceless and Ginny appeared, heading straight for the centre of the oxer. It was the most enormous fence, but they just sailed over it. As they carried on round the course, I could hear the commentator saying. "Clear, clear, clear." and it was as if a cloud had lifted." Kit Houghton, Equestrian Photographer

== Competition record ==
1986

- 10th Thirlestane Castle Advanced
- 2nd Gatcombe Park Advanced
- Individual Gold, Team Gold World Championships at Gawler CCIO ***

1985

- Individual and Team Gold at the European Championships at Burghley
- 2nd Locko Park Advanced
- 4th Holker Hall Advanced
- 1st Badminton Horse Trials CCI****
- 1st Brigstock Advanced
- 2nd Rushall Advanced

1984

- Individual Bronze & Team Silver medals Los Angeles Games
- 9th Castle Ashby Advanced
- 2nd Tweseldown OI
- 1st Brigstock Advanced

1983

- 1st Burghley Horse Trials
- 4th Gatcomb Park Advanced

1982

- Team Gold, 7th Individually World Championship at Luhmuhlen CCIO ***
- 1st Locko Park Advanced
- 4th Badminton Horse Trials CCI ****
- 1st Brigstock Advanced
- 3rd Frensham Advanced

1981

- 6th Individually, Team Gold European Championship at Horsens CCIO ***
- 1st Locko Park Advanced
- 4th Dauntsey Advanced
- 8th Badminton Horse Trials CCI ****
- 3rd Brigstock Advanced

1980

- 6th Burghley Horse Trials
