= Ben Faerie =

Eventing horse

- Breed: Thoroughbred
- Sire: Ben Hawke
- Grandsire: Chanteur
- Dam: Faerie House
- Maternal grandsire: Vieux Manor
- Sex: Stallion
- Foaled: 1968
- Country: Great Britain
- Colour: Bay, star, half-cannon on left hind
- Owner: Diana Scott

Ben Faerie was a Thoroughbred stallion who had a great influence on eventing horses in Great Britain. His descendants include Virginia Leng's mounts Priceless and Nightcap, and Pippa Funnell's mounts Primmore's Pride and Walk on Star. He stood 15.3hh (160 cm).

Ben Faerie was bought as a two-year-old at the Ascot sales by Diana Scott, for £250. It was originally intended to use him as a stud for producing fox hunters out of half-bred mares. He began breeding as a three-year-old, and produced over 800 offspring. The first were used in the hunt field, until Virginia Leng had amazing success with two Ben Faerie sons: Priceless and Night Cap. These sons gave him a name as an eventing sire.

Ben Faerie had the ability to pass on not only speed, but courage, good jumping ability and a wonderful temperament. Seventeen years after his death he was still rated the fifth best event sire of all time. In 1998, 1% of all horses in Britain were by the great stallion.
