= Richard Rader =

American equestrian

Personal information
- Nationality: American Virgin Islander
- Born: June 10, 1959 (age 67)

Sport
- Sport: Equestrian

Richard Rader (born June 10, 1959) is an equestrian who represents the United States Virgin Islands. He competed in the individual eventing at the 1984 Summer Olympics.
