= All the Wild Horses =

2017 equestrian adventure film by Ivo Marloh

- Directed by: Ivo Marloh
- Produced by: Ivo Marloh; Darcia Martin
- Starring: Erik Cooper; Donal Fahy; Devan Horn; Monde Kanyana; Richard Killoran; Margaret Pattinson; Simon Pearse; Deborah Swann; Barbara Thielman; Charlotte Treleaven; Unenburen Uyndenbat; Kate Willings; Julie Youngblood
- Cinematography: Michael J. Sanderson; Ivo Marloh
- Edited by: Ivo Marloh
- Music by: Christopher Barnett; Nature Ganganbaigal
- Production companies: 3rd-i Films; Wild Films
- Distributed by: 3rd-i Films
- Release dates: July 6, 2017 (Galway); March 6, 2018 (World)
- Running time: 93 minutes
- Countries: United Kingdom; Mongolia
- Languages: English; Mongolian

All the Wild Horses is a 2017 British documentary film directed by Ivo Marloh. The film follows a number of international riders from different countries as they compete in the 1,000 km (621 mi) Mongol Derby in Mongolia, a 10-day equestrian endurance race. The movie won multiple awards, including Best International Documentary Feature at its World premiere screening during the Galway Film Fleadh in Ireland in 2017.

== Synopsis ==
The film focuses on five international riders from Canada, the United States, the United Kingdom, South Africa, and Ireland as they compete in the longest endurance horse race in the world, the Mongol Derby. Showing the gruelling daily grind of the race itself, the film also tells the smaller stories of other participants, and features the many Mongolian herder families that help to organise the race.

The filmmakers introduce the riders on their journey from Ulaanbaatar across Mongolia to the start camp of the race. Forty riders from ten different countries make up the complete lineup of participants. Some talk about what brought them on the long journey here and become part of this race.

At start camp, the riders receive hands-on training with the very tough and semi-wild Mongolian horses that live in herds throughout most of the year and haven't changed much since the days of Chinggis Khan. A local herder explains that the horses need to retain their wild spirit in order to survive the harsh winters on the steppe. Led by race chief Kate Willings and head race referee Maggie Pattinson, the international crew takes the riders through various scenarios they might encounter on the steppe.

After a fast and dramatic race start — with the first two casualties taken off the field by medevac within the first hour — 22-year-old American rider Devan Horn takes an early lead, which she manages to retain for five days. The most experienced horseman in the field, South African horse whisperer Monde Kanyana, isn't as driven by the chance of winning as he is interested in learning about Mongolian horsemanship. It is his first time away from his native KwaZulu-Natal, and his overwhelm at the overall experience seems to outweigh his drive to push forward relentlessly, unlike some of the other competitors.

Irish jockeys Donie Fahy and Richie Killoran form fast friendships early on with British racehorse trainer Charlotte Treleaven and American firefighter Julie Youngblood. The four riders stick together through some very hard times as they keep chasing down the front runners of the race.

The race depicted on All The Wild Horses throws up many twists and turns as the days tick by — down to the winner eventually being decided by a veterinarian penalty handed down to one of the front runners.

== Production ==
Marloh grew up on a horse farm and inherited a fascination with Mongolia from his mother. He had always dreamed of riding across the steppe, so when he came across an article about the Mongol Derby, applying for a place in the race became a way of setting things in motion to make that dream a reality. When he eventually was accepted into the race, "the filmmaker in me took over, and I raised funds to take a highly-skilled two-person crew. The moment there was interest from investors at the Cannes Film Festival, I knew I had to make a proper film. And this, unfortunately, meant I took a backseat as a rider to concentrate on filming."

The film was shot over three years across large parts of Mongolia, from the ancient capital Kharakhorum of the Mongol Empire up to the northernmost tip at Khuvsgul Lake on the Russian border. Character introductions were filmed in South Africa, the United States, Ireland, and England. Coming from a background in screenwriting for dramatic films, Marloh structured the film in the edit just like he would a dramatic script — with acts, themes, and twists. He raced the Mongol Derby twice to get all the footage of the riders and followed the race one more time to complete filming b-roll footage.

== The Mongol Derby ==
The Mongol Derby is a 1,000 km (621 mi) endurance horse race across the Mongolian wilderness. The horses and riders race across the wide-open steppe, cross over steep mountains, trudge through flood plains and semi-arid deserts, trek over sand dunes, and tackle numerous river crossings. A recreation of Chinggis Khaan’s Morin Urtuu messenger system, the race is strung along a network of about 28 horse stations, where riders swap out their horses from a lineup of barely-broke fresh horses each time. These horses present one of the biggest challenges for the riders and demand a high level of horsemanship. This aspect, together with the harsh terrain and overall impact on the mental capacity to push through some very challenging and isolated periods, has made the Mongol Derby the toughest equestrian endurance race.

The riders are out on the steppe on their own and navigate with GPS from horse station to horse station, spaced around thirty-five kilometres apart. They have to contend with extreme heat and severe cold, tornados, isolation, and semi-wild packs of herder dogs. They can stay the nights out in the wild or with nomad families along the way. If they make a wrong choice in choosing a new horse, they could get bucked off and lose their mount, with no help nearby. Serious injuries, broken bones, and heat exhaustion are common and debilitating factors throughout the race.

== Reception ==
All The Wild Horses has received overall positive reviews from critics. Review aggregator website Rotten Tomatoes reports a 100% rating based on 15 critic reviews.

Andrew Murray for The Upcoming writes, "A heart-pounding adventure across the Mongolian wilderness, All The Wild Horses is an incredible depiction of the unbridled human spirit and a captivating documentary." The Guardian's Peter Bradshaw declares that "Ivo Marloh’s documentary about the Mongol Derby captures the beauty and bedlam of the 1,000-km cross-country race." Rich Cline of the film review website Shadows On The Wall opines that "The cinematography... is simply spectacular, capturing both the expansive landscapes and telling details about the competitors, their horses, the officials and the locals."

All The Wild Horses won a number of international awards, from the movie's world premiere at the Galway Film Fleadh, where it won Best International Documentary, the Phoenix International Film Festival, where the movie won World Cinema Audience Award, the Mountain Film Festival in Utah, where the movie won Best Film in the Sir Edmund Hillary Award Adventure Sports Competition, to the Equus Film Festival in New York City, where All The Wild Horses won Best Film, Best Director and Best Of Festival.

=== Awards and nominations ===
Award	Category	Recipients	Result
Galway Film Fleadh	Best International Documentary	All The Wild Horses	Won
Hamilton International Film Festival	Best Feature Documentary	All The Wild Horses	Nominated
Phoenix Film Festival	World Cinema Audience Award	All The Wild Horses	Won
Woods Hole Film Festival	Director's Award for Cinematography	Michael J. Sanderson, Ivo Marloh	Won
