= Purbrick =

Purbrick is a surname. Notable people with the surname include:

- Lizzie Purbrick (born 1955), British equestrian
- Reginald Purbrick (1877–1950), British politician
- Tim Purbrick (born 1964), British Army officer
