= Ian Roberts (equestrian) =

Canadian equestrian

Personal information
- Nationality: Canadian
- Born: October 28, 1958 (age 66); Victoria, British Columbia, Canada

Ian Roberts (born October 28, 1958, in Victoria, British Columbia) competed as a member of the Canadian Equestrian Team in eventing at the 2004 Summer Olympics.

His farm is Dreamcrest Farms, in Port Perry, Ontario, which he owns with his wife, Kelly Plitz, also an Olympic eventing rider.

Roberts placed 23rd at the 2006 Rolex Kentucky Three Day Event, and 20th at the 2007 competition. He represented Canada at the 2006 FEI World Equestrian Games, but was eliminated in the individual competition.

Roberts is a graduate of Brentwood College School, located in Mill Bay, British Columbia.
