= Jo Tudor =

Canadian equestrian

Personal information
- Born: 17 December 1959 (age 65) Winnipeg, Manitoba, Canada

Sport
- Sport: Equestrian

Jo Tudor (born 17 December 1959) is a Canadian equestrian. She competed in the individual eventing at the 1988 Summer Olympics.
