= Karen Stives =

American equestrian

Medal record

Equestrian

Representing the United States

Olympic Games
Gold medal – first place	1984 Los Angeles	Team eventing
Silver medal – second place	1984 Los Angeles	Individual eventing

Karen Elizabeth Stives (November 3, 1950 – August 14, 2015) was an American eventing competitor and Olympic champion.

== Olympics ==
Stives qualified for the 1980 U.S. Olympic team but did not compete due to the U.S. Olympic Committee's boycott of the 1980 Summer Olympics in Moscow, Russia. She was one of 461 athletes to receive a Congressional Gold Medal instead. At the 1984 Olympic Games in Los Angeles, Stives anchored the United States team that received a gold medal in Team eventing, and also an individual silver medal.
