= Armando Romero (equestrian) =

Mexican equestrian

Personal information
- Full name: Armando Romero Gil
- Nationality: Mexican
- Born: 27 August 1949 (age 75)

Sport
- Sport: Equestrian

Armando Romero Gil (Note: In this Spanish name, the first or paternal surname is Romero and the second or maternal family name is Gil.) (born 27 August 1949) is a Mexican equestrian. He competed in two events at the 1984 Summer Olympics.
