= Michael Pettersson (equestrian) =

Swedish equestrian

Personal information
- Nationality: Swedish
- Born: 22 June 1956 (age 68); Kristianstad, Sweden

Sport
- Sport: Equestrian

Michael Pettersson (born 22 June 1956) is a Swedish equestrian. He competed in two events at the 1984 Summer Olympics.
