= Göran Breisner =

Swedish equestrian

Personal information
- Nationality: Swedish
- Born: 1 July 1954 (age 72) Malmö, Sweden

Sport
- Sport: Equestrian
Medal record
Equestrian
Representing Sweden
European Championships
Gold medal – first place	1983 Frauenfeld	Team eventing

Göran Breisner (born 1 July 1954) is a Swedish equestrian. He competed in two events at the 1984 Summer Olympics.
