= Daniel Nion =

French equestrian

Personal information
- Nationality: French
- Born: 20 July 1951 (age 73)

Sport
- Sport: Equestrian

Daniel Nion (born 20 July 1951) is a French equestrian. He competed in two events at the 1984 Summer Olympics in Los Angeles, finishing fourth and twenty-sixth in the Team and Individual events respectively.
