= Fairbanks Ranch Country Club =

Fairbanks Ranch Country Club, San Diego
- Community of San Diego
- Fairbanks Ranch Country Club
- Location within San Diego County
- Coordinates: 32°58′29.7″N 117°12′54.6″W
- Country: United States of America
- State: California
- County: San Diego
- City: San Diego

Government
  - Type: CA District 52: Scott Peters

Fairbanks Ranch Country Club
- Interactive map of Fairbanks Ranch Country Club

Club information
- Established: 1984
- Type: Private
- Owner: Bay Club Company, San Francisco
- Total holes: 27
- Website: www.fairbanksranch.com/Club/Scripts/Home/home.asp

Fairbanks Ranch Country Club is a neighborhood and private golf club in northern San Diego, California. The area is bordered by the unincorporated San Diego County communities of Rancho Santa Fe to the north and Fairbanks Ranch to the east, the city of San Diego neighborhood of Pacific Highlands Ranch to the south, and undeveloped natural areas of North City, San Diego, to the west.

Due to its geography and history, residents and establishments in the area align closely with the adjacent communities of Fairbanks Ranch (hence the name), Rancho Santa Fe, and Del Mar. Rancho Santa Fe and Del Mar addresses are used in some parts of the area while being within San Diego city limits.

== Neighborhood ==
The neighborhood consists of several gated housing communities located south of the golf club and San Dieguito Road and one additional gated community as well as the Del Mar Polo Fields located north of the San Dieguito River. The portion of the community located north of the San Dieguito River typically utilizes Del Mar addresses despite being within the city limits of San Diego.

== Golf club ==
Founded in 1984, the golf club sits on 274 acres (111 ha) of land owned by the City of San Diego. The club uses a Rancho Santa Fe address despite being within San Diego city limits. It was originally member-owned. In July 2016 the members sold it to the Bay Club Company of San Francisco for an undisclosed sum.

The club features an 18-hole championship course designed by Ted Robinson. In 2004 a 9-hole course designed by Ted Robinson Jr. was added.

The club hosted the equestrian endurance portion of the eventing competitions for the 1984 Summer Olympics held in neighboring Los Angeles.

On August 9, 2018, the EEOC sued Fairbanks Ranch Country Club for sexual harassment.
