= Bettina Hoy =

German equestrian

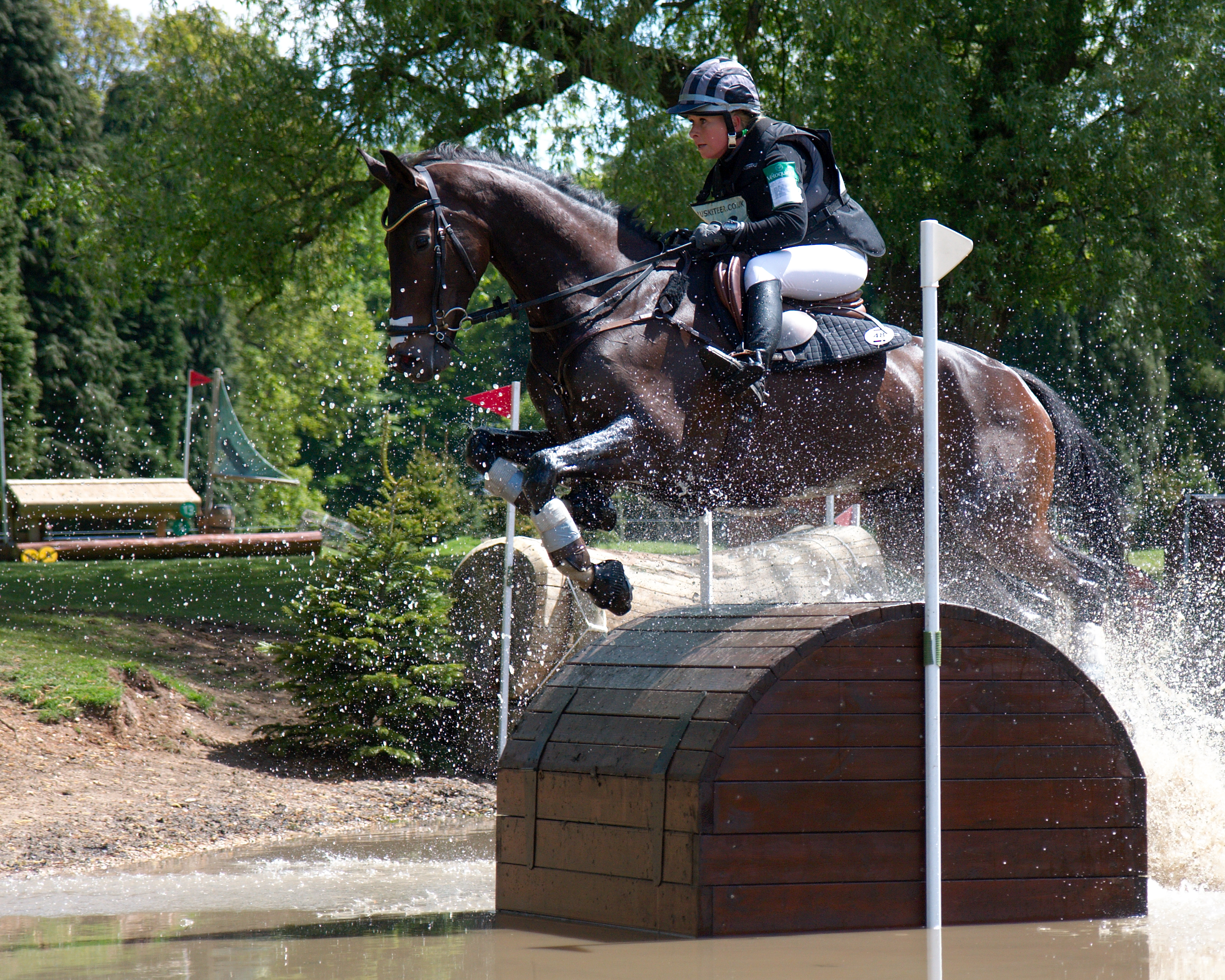
- Bettina Hoy and Designer 10 at the Treasure Chests during the cross-country phase of the CIC*** competition at Houghton International Horse Trials 2013.

Medal record

Equestrian

Representing West Germany

Olympic Games
Bronze medal – third place	1984 Los Angeles	Team eventing

Representing Germany

World Championships
Gold medal – first place	2006 Aachen	Team eventing
Bronze medal – third place	1994 Den Haag	Team eventing

European Championships
Gold medal – first place	1997 Burghley	Individual eventing
Bronze medal – third place	2005 Blenheim	Team eventing
Bronze medal – third place	2007 Pratoni del Vivaro	Individual eventing

Bettina Hoy (born Bettina Overesch: November 7, 1962) is an Olympic-level equestrian rider who competes for Germany in Eventing competitions. Bettina competed in the 1984 Summer Olympics, 1996 Summer Olympics, and 2004 Summer Olympics.

== 2004 Summer Olympics ==
At the 2004 Summer Olympics, held in Athens, Hoy competed in the three-day eventing competition, both as an individual rider and as part of the German team.

After the dressage and cross-country stages, Nicolas Touzaint was leading the field on the third day, Hoy was in second place, France was leading the team event, with Germany in second place as well. In the first round of show jumping, the third and final event, Hoy (the final jumper for the German team, as the best placed German rider) did not knock any fences down. However, Hoy had crossed the start line twice and was awarded 14 time penalties. After Hoy had crossed the start line the first time, the time clock had restarted and Hoy had thought she had the option of circling around again before starting her show jumping round.

The German team protested the time penalties to the appeals panel of the International Equestrian Federation (FEI), stating that Hoy could not have known her real time as the clock did not show her true time and that she could have ridden harder to avoid the time penalties. The decision to add the time penalties were reversed, with team gold being awarded to Germany and the individual gold to Hoy.

However, the British, French and American teams subsequently appealed to the Court of Arbitration for Sports (CAS), arguing that the FEI was wrong to remove Hoy's time penalties from her final result. The CAS' verdict was that the FEI appeals panel had overstated their jurisdiction in removing the time penalties. The CAS also stated that its decision was not based on any matters of FEI-rules, just on formal jurisdictional reasons. As a result, Hoy and the German team lost their gold medals, Germany getting placed 4th, Hoy 9th. Britain's Leslie Law received the individual gold medal, America's Kimberly Severson the silver and Britain's Pippa Funnell the bronze, Nicolas Touzaint finished 8th. In the team event, France won the gold, Britain the silver and America the bronze.

== CCI5* results ==
Results
Event	Kentucky	Badminton	Luhmühlen	Burghley	Pau	Adelaide
1997		11th (Watermil Stream)				
1998-2002	Did not participate					
2003		9th (Ringwood Cockatoo)		13th (Woodsides Ashby)		
2004	Did not participate					
2005			(gold) (Ringwood Cockatoo)			
2006			(silver) (Ringwood Cockatoo); 16th (Peaceful Warrior)	EL (Peaceful Warrior)		
2007			WD (Ringwood Cockatoo)			
2008					(gold) (Ringwood Cockatoo)	
2009	(silver) (Ringwood Cockatoo)					
2010	Did not participate					
2011			EL (Lanfranco)			
2012				10th (Lanfranco)		
2013		EL (Lanfranco)	WD (Lanfranco)	RET (Lanfranco)	28th (Lanfranco); WD (Designer 10)	
2014			8th (Designer 10)			
2015		5th (Designer 10)				
2016		20th (Designer 10)	WD (Seigneur Medicott)	6th (Designer 10)		
2017		RET (Designer 10)	(bronze) (Designer 10)			
2018					WD (Designer 10)	
EL = Eliminated; RET = Retired; WD = Withdrew

== International championship results ==
Results
Year	Event	Horse	Placing	Notes
1984	Olympic Games	Peacetime	3rd place, bronze medalist(s)	Team
1984	Olympic Games	Peacetime	14th	Individual
1994	World Equestrian Games	Watermill Stream	3rd place, bronze medalist(s)	Team
1994	World Equestrian Games	Watermill Stream	7th	Individual
1995	European Championships	Watermill Stream	4th	Team
1995	European Championships	Watermill Stream	12th	Individual
1996	Olympic Games	Watermill Stream	9th	Team
1997	European Championships	Watermill Stream	4th	Team
1997	European Championships	Watermill Stream	1st place, gold medalist(s)	Individual
1998	World Equestrian Games	Watermill Stream	EL	Individual
2002	World Equestrian Games	Woodsides Ashby	13th	Team
2002	World Equestrian Games	Woodsides Ashby	WD	Individual
2003	European Championships	Ringwood Cockatoo	7th	Team
2003	European Championships	Ringwood Cockatoo	23rd	Individual
2004	Olympic Games	Ringwood Cockatoo	4th	Team
2004	Olympic Games	Ringwood Cockatoo	9th	Individual
2005	European Championships	Ringwood Cockatoo	3rd place, bronze medalist(s)	Team
2005	European Championships	Ringwood Cockatoo	24th	Individual
2006	World Equestrian Games	Ringwood Cockatoo	1st place, gold medalist(s)	Team
2006	World Equestrian Games	Ringwood Cockatoo	6th	Individual
2007	European Championships	Ringwood Cockatoo	3rd place, bronze medalist(s)	Individual
2010	World Young Horse Championships	Designer 10	5th	CCI*
2011	World Young Horse Championships	Designer 10	6th	CCI**
2013	World Young Horse Championships	Seigneur Medicott	WD	CCI**
2015	European Championships	Designer 10	34th	Individual
2017	European Championships	Seigneur Medicott	10th	Team
2017	European Championships	Seigneur Medicott	EL	Individual
EL = Eliminated; RET = Retired; WD = Withdrew

== Personal ==
Bettina and her now ex-husband Andrew Hoy, who competes at the Olympic level for Australia, lived for 12 years in Gloucestershire, at the Gatcombe Park estate of The Princess Royal. The Hoys were the only married couple that has ever competed against each other in different teams for the same Olympic medals. In January 2009, the couple moved to the DOKR (Deutsches Olympia Kommitee für Reiterei) in Warendorf, Germany. In June 2010 Andrew Hoy moved to Farley Estate in the UK, and then to his current base in Wiltshire. In November 2011, Bettina publicly announced their separation. She handed her ride, Lanfranco TSF to her former husband, Andrew Hoy, under the terms of their divorce agreement.

== See also ==
- Equestrian at the 1984 Summer Olympics
- Equestrian at the 2004 Summer Olympics
