= Peter Sanders (cyclist) =

British cyclist

Personal information
- Born: 19 March 1961 (age 65); Hillingdon, London, England

Peter Sanders (born 19 March 1961) is a British former cyclist who competed in the individual road race and the team time trial events at the 1984 Summer Olympics.
