= Michael Mumford =

British modern pentathlete

Personal information
- Born: 16 December 1955 (age 70) Malaysia

Sport
- Sport: Modern pentathlon

Michael Mumford (born 16 December 1955) is a British modern pentathlete. He competed at the 1984 Summer Olympics.
