= Battle of Tarvis =

Battle of Tarvis may refer to:

- Battle of Tarvis (1797)
- Battle of Tarvis (1809)
