= Stuart Willmott =

British swimmer

Personal information
- Born: 4 June 1964 (age 61) London, UK
- Height: 1.80 m (5 ft 11 in)
- Weight: 71 kg (157 lb)

Sport
- Sport: Swimming
- Club: Stockton Aquatics

Stuart Willmott (born 4 June 1964) is a male retired British swimmer.

== Swimming career ==
He competed in the 1500 metres freestyle and 400 metres medley events at the 1984 Summer Olympics, but did not reach the finals. At the ASA National British Championships he won the 200 metres medley title in 1985

== Personal life ==
He is married to Alison and has two daughters, Chloe and Aimee; both are competitive swimmers, and Aimee has competed at the 2012 Summer Olympics. He works as a swimming coach at the Middlesbrough Amateur Swimming Club. His daughters train at the same club, but with different coaches.
