= Steve Bent =

British cyclist

Personal information
- Born: 9 April 1961 (age 65) London, England

Cycling career
- Sport: Cycling

Steve Bent (born 9 April 1961) is a British former cyclist. He competed in the individual pursuit and team pursuit events at the 1984 Summer Olympics.
