= Sandra del Castillo =

Mexican equestrian

Personal information
- Nationality: Mexican
- Born: 26 August 1959 (age 65)

Sport
- Sport: Equestrian

Sandra del Castillo (born 26 August 1959) is a Mexican equestrian. She competed in two events at the 1984 Summer Olympics.
