= Stephen Sowerby =

British modern pentathlete

Personal information
- Born: Harrogate, West Riding of Yorkshire, England

Sport
- Sport: Modern pentathlon

Stephen Sowerby was a British modern pentathlete. He competed at the 1984 Summer Olympics.
