= Mongol Derby =

Equestrian endurance race

The Mongol Derby is an equestrian endurance race. It extends 1,000 kilometres (620 mi) through the Mongolian Steppe and is the world's longest horse race. The course recreates the horse messenger system developed by Genghis Khan in 1224.

In the 2016 race, 21 men and 23 women, representing 13 countries, played the role of the messengers. The exact course changes every year and is kept secret until shortly before the race begins. The terrain invariably includes mountain passes, green open valleys, wooded hills, river crossings, wetlands and floodplains, sandy semi-arid dunes, rolling hills, dry riverbeds and open steppe.

The entry fee (£11,375 in 2020) provides the rider with access to 25-27 Mongolian horses, a support team, pre-race training, and support stations along the way. Riders must change horses every 40 kilometres (25 mi) at the support stations. Along the way, there are vet checks to monitor the condition of the horses, and the vets may impose time penalties if the riders push their horses too hard. To gain entry as a competitor, each rider must demonstrate that their riding skills are strong enough to endure the harsh conditions of the race. The horses themselves are semi-wild and may not cooperate with the rider, adding difficulty to the event.

Riders spend thirteen to fourteen hours a day in the saddle, and the race lasts ten days. It is common for only half the riders to finish in any given year.

== History ==
The first Mongol Derby took place in 2009 and has been held annually since then. It is a multi-horse race, modelled after the postal route established by Genghis Khan in 1224. It was the world's first long-distance postal system, based on a network of horse stations. The Mongol Derby similarly incorporates 25 horse stations and rest stops along a length of 1,000 kilometres (620 mi) through the Mongolian steppe. Along the course of the race, riders have the option to stay with local nomads or camp out. In 2010, the Mongol Derby achieved the Guinness World Record title of being the longest multi-horse race.

In addition to enduring the distance of the trek, some challenges faced by the participants include a high probability of injury associated with riding 25 different unfamiliar and "semi-wild" Mongol horses, travelling through remote and unmarked territory in a variety of landscapes, exposure to harsh elements, physical discomfort and exhaustion, and the rules of the race, such as restricted riding hours allowed each day.

In 2016, the Mongol Derby ended in a three-way tie between William Comiskey of Australia; Heidi Telstad of Canada, and Marcia Hefker Miles of the United States.

== Past winners ==
The following is a list of past winners of the Mongol Derby, and their home countries.

- 2026: Laura van Laar (Netherlands)
- 2024: Missy Morgan (Australia)
- 2023: Linda Hermann (Sweden)
- Aug 2022: Erdene-Ochir Uuganbayar (Mongolia)
- Jul 2022: Deirdre Griffith (USA), Willemien Jooste (South Africa)
- 2020 and 2021 postponed due to Covid pandemic.
- 2019: Robert "Bob" Long (United States of America)
- 2018: Annabel Neasham (United Kingdom) and Adrian Corboy (Australia)
- 2017: Ed Fernon (Australia) and Barry Armitage (South Africa)
- 2016: William Comiskey aka Dingo (Australia), Heidi Telstad (Canada) and Marcia Hefker Miles (United States of America)
- 2015: Byeronie Epstein (South Africa)
- 2014: Sam Jones (Australia)
- 2013: Lara Prior-Palmer (United Kingdom)
- 2012: Donal Fahy (Ireland)
- 2011: Craig Egberink (South Africa)
- 2010: Justin Nelzen (United States of America)
- 2009: Shiravsamboo Galbadrakh (Mongolia) and Charles van Wyk (South Africa)

== Film ==
A feature documentary film, All the Wild Horses, was shot over three races between 2012 and 2016, and released in 2018. The producer, Ivo Marloh, completed the Mongol Derby twice himself in order to get the footage needed for the film. It won a number of film awards, including Best International Feature Documentary at the Galway Film Fleadh in Ireland.
