= Margaret Knighton =

New Zealand equestrian

Medal record

Equestrian

Representing New Zealand

Olympic Games
Bronze medal – third place	1988 Seoul	Team eventing

Margaret "Marges" Knighton or Carline (born 14 February 1955 in Sheffield) is a New Zealand horsewoman who won a bronze medal at the 1988 Summer Olympics in Seoul. Knighton, riding Enterprise was in the New Zealand Three Day Event Team which finished third, along with Andrew Bennie, Tinks Pottinger and Mark Todd.

Knighton has since reverted to her maiden name of Carline and after retiring for a while has now returned to competition, specialising in dressage. She is also involved in coaching and judging.
