= Thies Kaspareit =

German equestrian

Medal record

Equestrian

Representing West Germany

Olympic Games
Gold medal – first place	1988 Seoul	Team eventing

Thies Kaspareit (born 1 February 1964 in Oldenburg in Holstein) is a German equestrian and Olympic champion. He won a team gold medal in eventing at the 1988 Summer Olympics in Seoul.
