= Salvador Suárez =

Mexican equestrian

Personal information
- Nationality: Mexican
- Born: 14 January 1948 (age 77)

Sport
- Sport: Equestrian

Salvador Suárez (born 14 January 1948) is a Mexican equestrian. He competed in two events at the 1984 Summer Olympics.
