= Tinks Pottinger =

New Zealand equestrian

Personal information
- Born: Judith Anne White; 26 April 1956 (age 70) Waipawa, New Zealand
- Height: 167 cm (5 ft 6 in)
- Weight: 63 kg (139 lb)

Sport
- Country: New Zealand
Medal record
Equestrian
Representing New Zealand
Olympic Games
Bronze medal – third place	1988 Seoul	Team eventing

Judith Anne Pottinger (née White; born 26 April 1956), known as Tinks Pottinger, is a New Zealand horsewoman who won a bronze medal at the 1988 Summer Olympics in Seoul. Pottinger, riding Volunteer, was in the New Zealand three-day event team which finished third, along with Andrew Bennie, Margaret Knighton and Mark Todd. In the individual three-day event at the same Olympics, she finished fifth.

Pottinger continued to compete in eventing until the late 1990s.

Pottinger was born in Waipawa on 26 April 1956, the daughter of Helen "Tiny" White (née Groome), a noted horsewoman and FEI judge, and Eric White. She was educated at Woodford House and Wellington Polytechnic. In 1983, she married Andy Pottinger, and the couple went on to have two children, including Amanda Pottinger, who has won the New Zealand three-day event championship.
