= Mary Hamilton (equestrian) =

New Zealand equestrian

Mary Darby (later Hamilton, born 30 September 1954) is an equestrian from New Zealand. She competed for New Zealand at the 1984 Summer Olympics at Los Angeles, coming 22nd in the 3-day event, and was in the team which came 6th in the 3-day team event.

== Books ==
- Black Gold by Ron Palenski (2008, 2004 New Zealand Sports Hall of Fame, Dunedin) p. 43 ISBN 047600683X
