= Charisma (horse) =

Equestrian eventing horse (1972–2003)

- Breed: New Zealand Sport Horse
- Sire: Tira Mink (Thoroughbred)
- Grandsire: Faux Tirage (Thoroughbred)
- Dam: Planet (Grade horse)
- Maternal grandsire: Kiritea
- Sex: Gelding
- Foaled: 30 October 1972
- Died: 7 January 2003 (aged 30)
- Country: New Zealand
- Colour: Dark bay with a star
- Breeder: Daphne and Peter Williams
- Owner: Mark Todd

Olympic medal record

Equestrian
Gold medal – first place	1984 Los Angeles	Individual eventing
Gold medal – first place	1988 Seoul	Individual eventing
Bronze medal – third place	1988 Seoul	Team eventing

Charisma (30 October 1972 – 7 January 2003), nicknamed "Podge" and "Stroppy", was a horse ridden by New Zealander Mark Todd. Charisma won many competitions in the sport of eventing. He is considered by many to be one of the greatest event horses ever to have competed. He stood 15.3 hands (63 inches, 160 cm).

== Breeding and early life ==
Charisma's dam, Planet, stood 15 hands (60 inches, 152 cm) and was sired by the Thoroughbred/Percheron-cross Kiritea. Planet's dam was a Thoroughbred named Starbourne. Planet was a successful Grade A show jumper in New Zealand and under rider Sheryl Douglas, became the first mare in New Zealand to jump her own height. After an injury ended her career, she was bred to the Thoroughbred stallion Tira Mink, and Charisma was foaled on 30 October 1972.

Charisma's first home was on the Williams' 3,000-acre (12 km^{2}) farm in Wairarapa, New Zealand. Even at a young age, Charisma was laid-back and easy to train. He was soon bought by David Murdoch, who placed the yearling in a small pasture with a four-foot fence, which Charisma jumped. The colt was gelded as a four-year-old, although he managed to cover four mares before that time.

== Competitive career ==
=== The Beginning: 1977–1982 ===
The young horse was slowly broken in, and later bought by Sharon Dearden in 1977. She competed him in Grade B show jumping competitions, and trained him up to intermediate level in eventing. Although the pair was long-listed for the Los Angeles Olympics, Dearden decided to sell the horse. Mrs. Fran Clark bought him and later lent him to Jennifer Stobart. Stobart brought him to Prix St Georges level in dressage "just for fun".

=== Under Mark Todd: 1983–1986 ===
Mark Todd was offered Charisma to ride by Virginia Caro, as his experienced horse was sick. In May 1983, he tried the gelding out and brought him back to his place to get the horse fit. Charisma was a bit fat at that time and had to be bedded on newspaper strips, as he would try to eat other bedding. Keeping the weight off the horse was always quite a struggle.

Charisma won his first two one-day events with Todd and then won the National One-Day Event Championship and National Three-day Event at Taupo (both of which he led after dressage and finished on his dressage score). The pair was then selected for the Los Angeles Olympics.

Charisma was moved to England in February 1984. During the trip, he became sick, and the illness never really left him for the rest of his career. The gelding was taken to the Badminton Horse Trials later that year, where he finished in 2nd place on his dressage score. A few months later, at the Los Angeles Olympic Games, Todd and Charisma finished well after dressage and then put in a clear cross-country and stadium round. A rail down by Karen Stives, who was leading by a few points, allowed the pair to clinch the individual gold.

After the Olympics, Charisma's owner, Fran Clark, decided to sell her horse. In 1985, she offered Charisma to the British rider Lizzie Purbrick. Knowing that Todd wanted the horse badly, Purbrick managed a deal with him to buy Charisma behind Clark's back. Todd's sponsor, Woolrest, transferred 50,000 pounds to Lizzie's account, to which she paid Clark, and Todd now was the official rider of Charisma under Woolrest's sponsorship.

Todd continued to compete Charisma in England, where he placed second at the 1985 Badminton Horse Trials and won every one-day event of the season in which they competed, except Dauntsey after a fall on cross-country. In 1986, the pair went to the World Championships in Australia. There they had a fall at the water and two rails down in stadium, and they finished in 10th place. A few weeks later in Luhmuhlen, they won both individually and as part of a team.

=== The end of his career: 1987–1988 ===
However, Charisma never got his chance to win Badminton, as it was cancelled in 1987. He won the three-star in Saumur, and the pair almost won Burghley that year, but two rails down in show jumping dropped them to second. They later won the British Open Championships before shipping to Seoul.

At the 1988 Olympics, Charisma put in a stellar dressage test, and jumped clear rounds in both the cross-country and stadium. He won the individual gold yet again, and beat the second-place horse, Sir Wattie, by the incredible margin of 10.20 penalties. The New Zealand team also won the bronze that year. The back-to-back Olympic win in eventing had only been accomplished once before.

=== Retirement ===
Charisma was retired after his second Olympic victory and he went home to New Zealand. He then went on a six-month tour before taking a well-earned rest. He was later shipped to Britain in 1995 to continue retirement.

On 7 January 2003, Charisma was euthanized at Mark Todd's Rivermonte Farm in Cambridge, after breaking a shoulder in the field. He was 30 years old.

== Achievements ==
- Second place at the Badminton Horse Trials in 1984 and 1985
- Individual Gold at the 1984 Olympics in Los Angeles
- Won the Luhmuhlen, Germany Three-Day Event in 1986
- Second place at the Burghley Horse Trials, England in 1987
- Won the British Open Championships in 1987
- Individual Gold and Team Bronze at the 1988 Olympics in Seoul
- Voted best NZ Sport Horse in the world in 1983 and 1985
- Smallest Thoroughbred foal in Invercargill, NZ in 1972
- Horse with the most fan mail in New Zealand
- Carried Mark Todd into the stadium carrying the torch at the opening ceremony of the 1990 Commonwealth Games in Auckland, New Zealand

In 2020, Charisma was inducted into the Equestrian Sports New Zealand Hall of Fame.
