= Margaret Tollerton =

Irish equestrian

Personal information
- Nationality: Irish
- Born: 13 August 1958 (age 68)

Sport
- Sport: Equestrian

Margaret Tollerton (born 13 August 1958) is an Irish equestrian. She competed in two events at the 1984 Summer Olympics.
