= Lizzie Purbrick =

British equestrian

Medal record

Equestrian

Representing Great Britain

European Championships
Gold medal – first place	1981 Horsens	Team eventing

Elizabeth Mary Josephine Purbrick (née Boone; born 16 May 1955 at Warren Farm, West Acre, Norfolk) is a winner of an Armada Dish at the Badminton Horse Trials in 1984 having competed several times with several mounts including Peter the Great and in many different events. In 1978 she went as an individual to the World Championships at Lexington, Kentucky but finished a poor 16th. There were no less than 22 retirements on the cross country phase. She was part of the British team selected for the 1980 Olympics which the British team attended in part, the British government taking no official position on the US-led boycott. In 1981 she was a member of the team that won a European Gold Medal at Horsens, Denmark.

After moving to South Africa, Purbrick retired after being ousted by the UK equine institutions. There on a small farm breeding horses, she also coached young people in horsemanship and maintained a parrot sanctuary. After her marriage broke down she returned to the UK, engaging again with the horsemanship community, and also became involved in a personal relationship with Conservative peer Lord Prior.

In 2018, after Purbrick had seen Prior in the company of another woman, she entered his home in Kennington, South London with a key that he had given her, and then daubed graffiti on the walls in pig's blood.

In a later High Court case, she admitted one charge of criminal damage. District judge Susan Green described the "series of highly abusive slogans" as "quite appalling", and sentenced Purbrick to 120 hours' community service and imposed a restraining order. She appeared on ITV Daytime show This Morning on 30 July 2018.
