= Park Dong-ju =

South Korean equestrian

Personal information
- Nationality: South Korean
- Born: 27 March 1963 (age 62)

Sport
- Sport: Equestrian

Park Dong-ju (Korean: 박동주, also transliterated Park Dong-joo; born 27 March 1963) is a South Korean equestrian. He competed in two events at the 1988 Summer Olympics.
