= Martha Griggs =

Canadian equestrian

Personal information
- Born: 18 June 1953 (age 72) Montreal, Quebec, Canada

Sport
- Sport: Equestrian

Martha Griggs (born 18 June 1953) is a Canadian equestrian. She competed in two events at the 1984 Summer Olympics.
