= Fiona Wentges =

Irish equestrian

Personal information
- Nationality: Irish
- Born: 3 February 1958 (age 68)

Sport
- Sport: Equestrian
Medal record
Equestrian
Representing Ireland
European Championships
Silver medal – second place	1991 Punchestown	Team eventing

Fiona Wentges (born 3 February 1958) is an Irish equestrian. She competed in two events at the 1984 Summer Olympics.
