= Kelly Plitz =

Canadian equestrian

Personal information
- Full name: Susan Kelly Plitz
- Born: 31 October 1957 (age 68); Ajax, Ontario, Canada
- Height: 159 cm (5 ft 3 in)
- Weight: 50 kg (110 lb)

Kelly Plitz (born 31 October 1957) is a Canadian equestrian. She competed in two events at the 1984 Summer Olympics.

Her husband Ian Roberts is also an Olympic equestrian, while their son Waylon is a two-time Pan American Games medalist in equestrian.
