= Torrance Watkins =

American equestrian

Personal information
- Other names: Torrance Fleischmann
- Nationality: American
- Discipline: Eventing
- Born: July 30, 1949 (age 77)
- Height: 5 ft 4.5 in (1.64 m)
- Weight: 106 lb (48 kg; 7 st 8 lb)
- Horse(s): Poltroon, Finvarra
Medal record
Equestrian
Representing the United States
Olympic Games
Gold medal – first place	1984 Los Angeles	Team eventing
World Championships
Bronze medal – third place	1982 Luhmühlen	Team eventing

Torrance Watkins (born July 30, 1949) is an American equestrian and Olympic champion. Formerly known as Torrance Fleischmann, she won a team gold medal in eventing at the 1984 Summer Olympics in Los Angeles, and finished 4th in the individual contest.

== Early years ==
Watkins is the daughter of August and Torrance Watkins (Sr.); she has three brothers: Richardson, Thornton, and August Jr. Her family was full of horsemen, many of them foxhunters, and she began riding to the hounds at the age of four. She then lived in Peru during her teenage years, and graduated from the University of Denver.

== International accomplishments ==
Watkins made her international debut in the 1970s, and her career spanned into the 1990s. Her two most famous horses include the pinto mare Poltroon, and the ex-racehorse Finvarra. Her accomplishments include:

=== 1978 ===
- World Championships team silver

=== 1979 ===
- USCTA Leading Lady

=== 1980 ===
- USCTA Rider of the Year
- USCTA Leading Lady
- Qualified for the 1980 U.S. Olympic team but did not compete due to the U.S. Olympic Committee's boycott of the 1980 Summer Olympics in Moscow, Russia. She was one of 461 athletes to receive a Congressional Gold Medal instead.
- Fontainebleau Olympic Games, individual bronze, making her the first woman to win a medal in the sport. She rode Poltroon. This was particularly notable due Poltroon's diminutive size for an event horse. Poltroon was a 15.1h Paint mare who went on to become a broodmare in her retirement.
- Winner of the Modified Advanced division at the Rolex Kentucky Three Day

=== 1982 ===
- World Championships team bronze

=== 1983 ===
- USCTA Leading Lady

=== 1984 ===
- USCTA Leading Lady
- Los Angeles Olympic Games, team gold, fourth place individually, only US rider to have a double-clear cross-country and stadium round

=== 1985 ===
- USCTA Leading Lady

=== 1986 ===
- Part of the USET World Championships team

=== 2003 ===
- First woman to be inducted into the US Eventing Hall of Fame

== Other notable accomplishments ==
Watkins finished second at the Burghley Horse Trials and fourth at the Badminton Horse Trials. She is a licensed course designer, having designed such courses as the CDCTA 3-Day and Intermediate Horse Trials, and the GMHA Preliminary and Intermediate Horse Trial courses. She also organized the Over the Walls Horse Trials for five years at Great Meadowbrook Farm, which was a CIC*** World Cup qualifier in 2004 and was used as a selection trial for Canadian and U.S. Equestrian Teams for the Olympic and World Equestrian Games.

== Personal life ==
Watkins married Charles Fleischmann in February 1981; she competed under his last name in the 1984 Olympics. In 1988 Watkins lost four of her champion horses, including Curragh, in a horrific barn fire. She lost most of her competition ribbons, cups and trophies as well as her 1984 Olympic 3-day event medal. In June 1995, Watkins and her partner Erik Fleming purchased a 105-acre (42 ha) property in Hardwick, Massachusetts, which they named Morningfield Farm. The couple later acquired three adjacent parcels of land. In 1998, they bought a 365-acre (148 ha) farm which they called Great Meadowbrook.

== Sources ==
- US Eventing Hall of Fame Inductees
