= Virginia Elliott =

British equestrian

Medal record

Equestrian

Representing Great Britain

Olympic Games
| Silver medal – second place | 1984 Los Angeles | Team eventing |
| Silver medal – second place | 1988 Seoul | Team eventing |
| Bronze medal – third place | 1984 Los Angeles | Individual eventing |
| Bronze medal – third place | 1988 Seoul | Individual eventing |

World Championships
| Gold medal – first place | 1982 Luhmühlen | Team eventing |
| Gold medal – first place | 1986 Gawler | Individual eventing |
| Gold medal – first place | 1986 Gawler | Team eventing |
| Silver medal – second place | 1990 Stockholm | Team eventing |

European Championships
| Gold medal – first place | 1981 Horsens | Team eventing |
| Gold medal – first place | 1985 Burghley | Individual eventing |
| Gold medal – first place | 1985 Burghley | Team eventing |
| Gold medal – first place | 1987 Luhmühlen | Individual eventing |
| Gold medal – first place | 1987 Luhmuhlen | Team eventing |
| Gold medal – first place | 1989 Burghley | Individual eventing |
| Gold medal – first place | 1989 Burghley | Team eventing |
| Silver medal – second place | 1983 Frauenfeld | Team eventing |

Virginia Helen Antoinette Elliott MBE (née Holgate, formerly Leng; born 1 February 1955), sometimes known as Ginny Leng, is a British equestrian competitor who competed in eventing. She is the 1986 World Champion and three-time Individual European Champion (1985, 1987, 1989). She also won two World team golds (1982 and 1986) and four European team golds (1981, 1985–89). A four-time Olympic medallist, she won Individual bronze and team silver in both 1984 and 1988. From 2008 to 2013, she was the manager of the Irish eventing team.

She was appointed Member of the Order of the British Empire (MBE) in the 1986 Birthday Honours "for services to Riding."

== Major wins/ Significant Horses ==
World and European titles:

- 1985 European champion – Priceless
- 1986 World champion – Priceless
- 1987 European champion – Night Cap II
- 1989 European champion – Master Craftsman

Badminton Horse Trials:

- 1985 – Priceless,
- 1989 – Master Craftsman,
- 1993 – Welton Houdini

Burghley Horse Trials:

- 1983 – Priceless,
- 1984 – Night Cap II,
- 1985 – Priceless,
- 1986 – Murphy Himself
- 1989 – Master Craftsman (first person to win Burghley five times)
- HORSES
- Priceless
- Night cap
- Murphy Himself
- Master Craftsman
- Dubbonet
- Ballyhack
- Griffin
- Welton Houdini

== Personal life ==
Born Virginia Holgate and raised in Malta, she married Hamish Leng in 1985. The couple divorced in 1989. In 1993, she married Michael Elliott. Her horses Night Cap II and Priceless, were by the eventing stallion Ben Faerie. Since the 1980s, she has written several books.

In 1987, she participated in Prince Edward's charity television special The Grand Knockout Tournament.
