= Sarah Gordon (equestrian) =

Irish equestrian

Personal information
- Nationality: Irish
- Born: 24 October 1963
- Died: 29 April 2016 (aged 52)

Sport
- Sport: Equestrian

Sarah Gordon (24 October 1963 – 29 April 2016) was an Irish equestrian. She competed in two events at the 1984 Summer Olympics.
