= Geremia Toia =

Italian equestrian

Personal information
- Nationality: Italian
- Born: 19 January 1966 (age 60) Gallarate, Italy

Sport
- Sport: Equestrian

Geremia Toia (born 19 January 1966) is an Italian equestrian. He competed in two events at the 1984 Summer Olympics.
