= Burkhard Tesdorpf =

German equestrian

Medal record

Equestrian

Representing West Germany

Olympic Games
Bronze medal – third place	1984 Los Angeles	Team eventing

Burkhard Tesdorpf (born 6 October 1962) is a German equestrian and Olympic medalist. He competed in eventing at the 1984 Summer Olympics in Los Angeles, and won a bronze medal with the German team.
