= Hiroshi Watanabe (equestrian) =

Japanese equestrian

Personal information
- Nationality: Japanese
- Born: 23 February 1947 (age 78)

Sport
- Sport: Equestrian

Hiroshi Watanabe (渡辺 弘, Watanabe Hiroshi, born 23 February 1947) is a Japanese equestrian. He competed in two events at the 1988 Summer Olympics.
