= Elizabeth Ashton =

Canadian equestrian

Liz Ashton
Personal information
- Full name: Elizabeth Ashton
- Born: 16 March 1950 (age 76) Darwen, United Kingdom
Medal record
Equestrian
Representing Canada
World Championships
Gold medal – first place	1978 Lexington	Team eventing
Pan American Games
Silver medal – second place	1975 Mexico City	Team eventing

Dr. Elizabeth "Liz" Ashton (born 16 March 1950) was a member of the Canadian Equestrian Team for Eventing, best known for captaining Canada's gold medal team at the 1978 Eventing World Championship. She was also chosen for Canada's team at the 1980 Summer Olympics, but did not compete due to the Canadian Olympic Committee's decision to boycott those Games. She did compete at the 1984 Summer Olympics.

Ashton has also served as president of Victoria's Camosun College since 1994.

She was awarded the 125th Anniversary of the Confederation Medal in 1992 and the Majesty Queen Elizabeth's Golden Jubilee medal in 2003.
