= Diana Clapham =

British equestrian

Personal information
- Born: 8 June 1957 (age 69) Kuala Lumpur, Malaysia
Medal record
Equestrian
Representing Great Britain
Olympic Games
| Silver medal – second place | 1984 Los Angeles | Team eventing |
European Championships
| Silver medal – second place | 1983 Frauenfeld | Team eventing |

Diana Clapham (born 8 June 1957) is a British equestrian. She was born in Kuala Lumpur, Malaysia. She won a silver medal in team eventing at the 1984 Summer Olympics in Los Angeles.
