= Fairbanks Ranch, California =

Fairbanks Ranch
- Unincorporated Community; Census Designated Place
- Location in San Diego County and the state of California

- Location in the United States
- Coordinates: 32°59′45″N 117°10′59″W
- Country: United States
- State: California
- County: San Diego
- Community services district established: 1987

Area
  - Total: 5.100 sq mi (13.208 km^{2})
  - Land: 5.095 sq mi (13.196 km^{2})
  - Water: 0.0046 sq mi (0.012 km^{2}) 0.09%

Population (2020)
  - Total: 3,002
  - Density: 589.2/sq mi (227.5/km^{2})
- Time zone: UTC-8 (PST)
  - Summer (DST): UTC-7 (PDT)
- ZIP code: 92067
- Area code: 858
- FIPS code: 06-23150
- GNIS feature ID: 2408101

Fairbanks Ranch is a census-designated place (CDP) in San Diego County, California. The population was 3,002 at the 2020 census, down from 3,148 at the 2010 census. The entire population is contained within two gated communities, divided into North and South sections by the formerly private San Dieguito Road.

The Fairbanks Ranch community borders Rancho Santa Fe to the northwest, the Rancho Santa Fe Farms gated community to the south and the Del Sur housing development of Black Mountain Ranch to the east. The San Dieguito River and Lusardi Creek with the Lusardi Creek County Preserve lie to the north.

== Geography ==
Fairbanks Ranch is located at 32°59′45″N 117°10′59″W (32.995786, -117.183106).

According to the United States Census Bureau, the CDP has a total area of 5.1 square miles (13 km^{2}). 5.1 square miles (13 km^{2}) of it is land and 0.09% is water.

== Demographics ==
Historical population
Census	Pop.	Note	%±
2000	2,244		—
2010	3,148		40.3%
2020	3,002		−4.6%
U.S. Decennial Census; 1860–1870 1880-1890; 1900 1910 1920; 1930 1940 1950; 1960 1970 1980; 1990 2000 2010; 2020

Fairbanks Ranch first appeared as a census designated place in the 2000 U.S. census.

=== Racial and ethnic composition ===
Fairbanks Ranch CDP, California – Racial and ethnic composition Note: the US Census treats Hispanic/Latino as an ethnic category. This table excludes Latinos from the racial categories and assigns them to a separate category. Hispanics/Latinos may be of any race.
Race / Ethnicity (NH = Non-Hispanic)	Pop 2000	Pop 2010	Pop 2020	% 2000	% 2010	% 2020
White alone (NH)	1,986	2,605	2,227	88.50%	82.75%	74.18%
Black or African American alone (NH)	4	24	20	0.18%	0.76%	0.67%
Native American or Alaska Native alone (NH)	5	7	0	0.22%	0.22%	0.00%
Asian alone (NH)	126	199	397	5.61%	6.32%	13.22%
Native Hawaiian or Pacific Islander alone (NH)	4	3	1	0.18%	0.10%	0.03%
Other race alone (NH)	4	6	15	0.18%	0.19%	0.50%
Mixed race or Multiracial (NH)	35	80	136	1.56%	2.54%	4.53%
Hispanic or Latino (any race)	80	224	206	3.57%	7.12%	6.86%
Total	2,244	3,148	3,002	100.00%	100.00%	100.00%

=== 2020 census ===
As of the 2020 census, Fairbanks Ranch had a population of 3,002 and a population density of 589.2 inhabitants per square mile (227.5/km^{2}).

The whole population lived in households. 100.0% of residents lived in urban areas, while 0.0% lived in rural areas.

There were 1,105 households, out of which 24.3% included children under the age of 18, 74.0% were married-couple households, 3.3% were cohabiting couple households, 14.3% had a female householder with no spouse or partner present, and 8.3% had a male householder with no spouse or partner present. About 12.8% of households were one person, and 7.9% were one person aged 65 or older. The average household size was 2.72. There were 918 families (83.1% of all households).

The age distribution was 18.0% under the age of 18, 7.7% aged 18 to 24, 11.7% aged 25 to 44, 32.1% aged 45 to 64, and 30.6% who were 65 years of age or older. The median age was 55.0 years. For every 100 females, there were 101.5 males, and for every 100 females age 18 and over, there were 101.9 males age 18 and over.

There were 1,220 housing units at an average density of 239.5 units per square mile (92.5 units/km^{2}), of which 1,105 (90.6%) were occupied. Of these, 91.3% were owner-occupied, and 8.7% were occupied by renters. The homeowner vacancy rate was 1.3%, and the rental vacancy rate was 6.7%.

=== Income and poverty ===
In 2023, the US Census Bureau estimated that the median household income was more than $250,000, and the per capita income was $91,364.

=== 2010 census ===
At the 2010 census Fairbanks Ranch had a population of 3,148. The population density was 619.8 inhabitants per square mile (239.3/km^{2}). The racial makeup of Fairbanks Ranch was 2,780 (88.3%) White, 24 (0.8%) African American, 7 (0.2%) Native American, 209 (6.6%) Asian, 4 (0.1%) Pacific Islander, 34 (1.1%) from other races, and 90 (2.9%) from two or more races. Hispanic or Latino of any race were 224 people (7.1%).

The whole population lived in households, no one lived in non-institutionalized group quarters and no one was institutionalized.

There were 1,099 households, 393 (35.8%) had children under the age of 18 living in them, 891 (81.1%) were opposite-sex married couples living together, 39 (3.5%) had a female householder with no husband present, 28 (2.5%) had a male householder with no wife present. There were 22 (2.0%) unmarried opposite-sex partnerships, and 8 (0.7%) same-sex married couples or partnerships. 111 households (10.1%) were one person and 53 (4.8%) had someone living alone who was 65 or older. The average household size was 2.86. There were 958 families (87.2% of households); the average family size was 3.04.

The age distribution was 759 people (24.1%) under the age of 18, 204 people (6.5%) aged 18 to 24, 378 people (12.0%) aged 25 to 44, 1,250 people (39.7%) aged 45 to 64, and 557 people (17.7%) who were 65 or older. The median age was 49.4 years. For every 100 females, there were 94.7 males. For every 100 females age 18 and over, there were 93.6 males.

There were 1,218 housing units at an average density of 239.8 per square mile, of the occupied units 1,030 (93.7%) were owner-occupied and 69 (6.3%) were rented. The homeowner vacancy rate was 2.1%; the rental vacancy rate was 4.1%. 2,945 people (93.6% of the population) lived in owner-occupied housing units and 203 people (6.4%) lived in rental housing units.

== Notable residents ==
- Dinesh D'Souza, author
- Douglas Fairbanks, actor, played "Zorro", and wife Mary Pickford, both founding members of United Artists
- Trevor Hoffman, former Hall of Fame relief pitcher for the San Diego Padres
- Joan Kroc, heiress to McDonald's fortune
- Ted Leitner, radio talk show host and play-by-play announcer for the San Diego Padres
- Mark Loretta, a former San Diego Padres player
