= Claus Erhorn =

German equestrian

Medal record

Equestrian

Representing West Germany

Olympic Games
Gold medal – first place	1988 Seoul	Team eventing
Bronze medal – third place	1984 Los Angeles	Team eventing

European Championships
Silver medal – second place	1987 Luhmühlen	Team eventing
Bronze medal – third place	1985 Burghley	Team eventing
Bronze medal – third place	1987 Luhmühlen	Individual eventing

Claus Erhorn (born 18 January 1959 in Hamburg-Harburg) is a German equestrian and Olympic champion. He won a team gold medal in eventing at the 1988 Summer Olympics in Seoul.
