= Lucinda Green =

British equestrian (born 1953)

Lucinda Green MBE
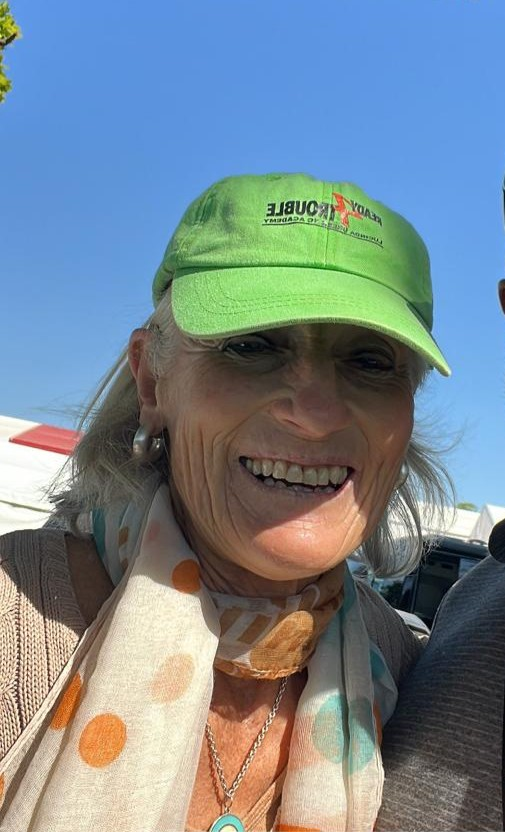
- Green at Badminton Horse Trials 2025

Personal information
- Nationality: British
- Born: Lucinda Jane Prior-Palmer; 7 November 1953 (age 72) Andover, Hampshire, UK
Medal record
Equestrian
Representing Great Britain
Olympic Games
Silver medal – second place	1984 Los Angeles	Team eventing
World Championships
Gold medal – first place	1982 Luhmühlen	Individual eventing
Gold medal – first place	1982 Luhmühlen	Team eventing
European Championships
Gold medal – first place	1975 Luhmühlen	Individual eventing
Gold medal – first place	1977 Burghley	Individual eventing
Gold medal – first place	1977 Burghley	Team eventing
Gold medal – first place	1985 Burghley	Team eventing
Gold medal – first place	1987 Luhmũhlen	Team eventing
Silver medal – second place	1975 Luhmühlen	Team eventing
Silver medal – second place	1979 Luhmuhlen	Team eventing
Silver medal – second place	1983 Frauenfeld	Individual eventing
Silver medal – second place	1983 Frauenfeld	Team eventing
Bronze medal – third place	1973 Kiev	Team eventing

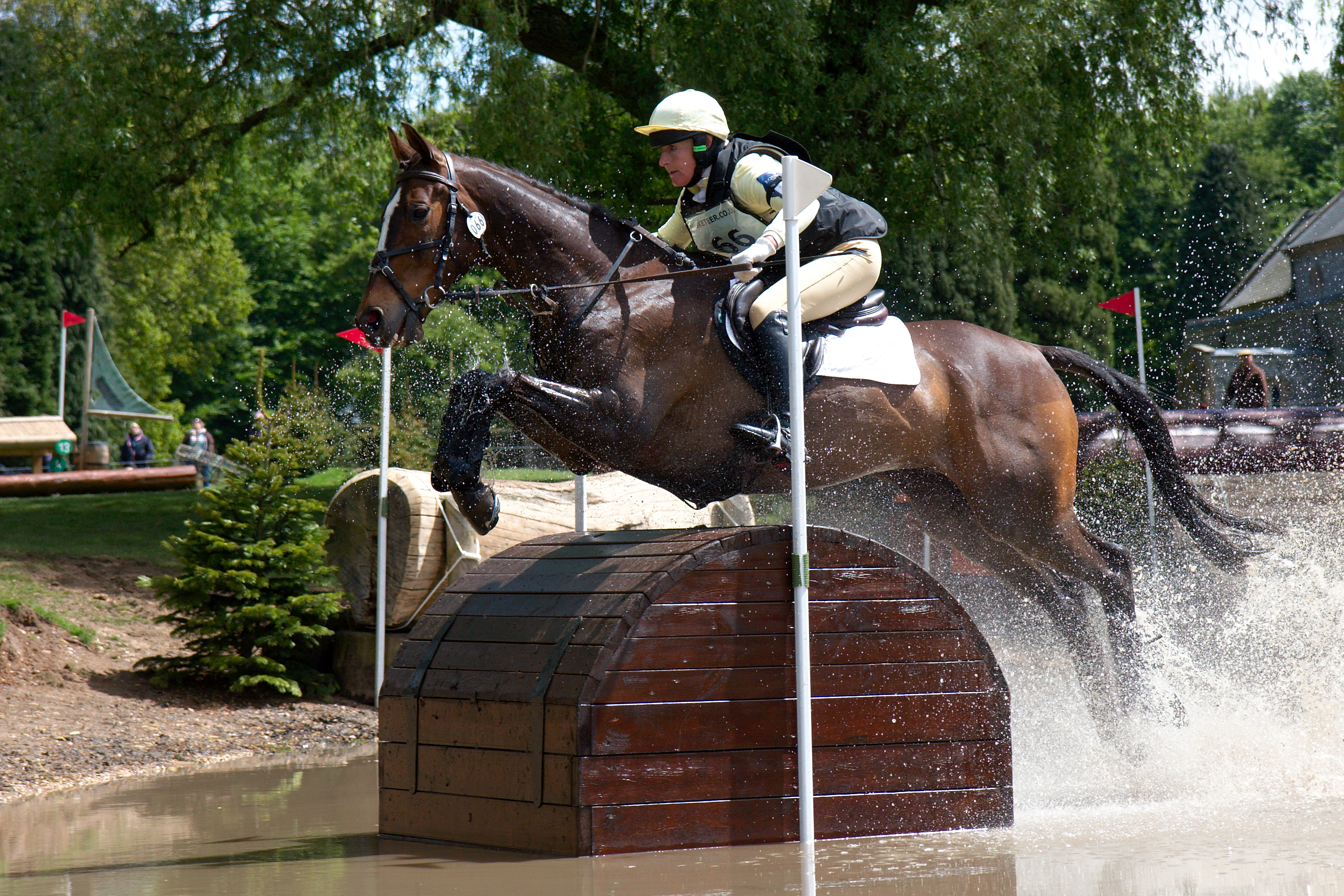
Green and Cry Freedom at the Treasure Chests during the cross-country phase of the CIC*** competition at Houghton International Horse Trials 2013.

Lucinda Jane Green MBE (née Prior-Palmer, born 7 November 1953) is a British equestrian and journalist who competed in eventing. She is the 1982 World Champion and twice European Champion (1975–77). She also won World team Gold (1982), three European team golds (1977, 1985, 1987) and an Olympic silver medal in the team event in 1984. Between 1973 and 1984, she won a record six times at the Badminton Horse Trials (on six different horses). She also won the Burghley Horse Trials in 1977 and 1981. She was appointed a Member of the Order of the British Empire (MBE) in the 1978 Birthday Honours for services to Horse Riding.

In 2020, she launched The Lucinda Green XC Academy, an online membership for cross-country riding.

== Early life ==
Lucinda Jane Prior-Palmer was born in Andover, Hampshire on 7 November 1953. Her father is Major-General George Erroll Prior-Palmer (died 1977) and her mother is Lady Doreen Hersey Winifred Hope, a daughter of the second Marquess of Linlithgow, who served as Viceroy of India from 1936 to 1943. She attended the independent St Mary's School in Wantage and Idbury Manor in Oxford.

== Career ==
Green began riding at the age of four and is most well known for winning the Badminton Horse Trials a record six times, on six different horses: Be Fair (1973), Wideawake (1976), George (1977), Killaire (1979), Regal Realm (1983) and Beagle Bay (1984). In addition, she was placed second on Village Gossip (1978). She has also won the Tony Collins Trophy, awarded to the British rider with the greatest number of points in eventing in a season, a record seven times.

Green first represented Britain at the 1973 European Championships at Kiev. She competed in the European Championships a total of seven times and was European Champion in 1975, on Be Fair, and again in 1977, on George.

She attended her first Olympics in 1976, at the Montreal Games. However, she had to retire after the cross-country event after her mount, Be Fair, slipped a tendon on course. In 1980, the British Equestrian Team took part in the 1980 Summer Olympics boycott, and Green represented Great Britain at the alternative Olympics at Fontainebleau, where she was in 69th place after the dressage, rising to 7th after the cross-country ride, on Village Gossip.

Green's 1981 career included a win at the Burghley Horse Trials on Beagle Bay.

In 1982, she went on to represent Britain at the Eventing World Championships in Luhmühlen, where she won the individual gold medal on Regal Realm, as well as being part of the gold medal-winning team. She was part of the silver medal-winning British Team at the 1983 European Eventing Championships in Switzerland, where she also won an individual silver medal.

In 1984, Green attended Badminton, and not only won for the sixth time, on Beagle Bay, but also placed fifth on Village Gossip. Later that year, at the Los Angeles Olympics, she represented the silver medal British Team and individually placed 6th. Green was team GB's flag bearer at the opening ceremony in Los Angeles, leading the British team into the arena during the parade of nations.

Green became a mother in 1985, and she retired for a few months before returning to international competition later that year and helping the British Team win the gold at the European Championships held at Burghley. She was short-listed to attend the 1986 World Championships as well, but an injury to her horse forced her to withdraw. However, in late 1986 she went on to win the event at Boekelo.

Green finished her international career after attending the 1987 European Championships in Luhmuhlen. She now is a commentator for major events, and conducts clinics worldwide. Green is a member of the Board of Directors of British Eventing, formerly the British Horse Trials Association and a team selector.

In October 2020, she launched the Lucinda Green Cross Country Academy, an online membership.

== Personal life ==
Green married Australian equestrian David Green in 1981 in Salisbury and they have a son Freddie (born 1985) and daughter Lissa (born 1989), who is an international event rider. The couple divorced in 1992. Her niece is Lara Prior-Palmer, the first woman to win the Mongol Derby.

== Major accomplishments ==
- Six-times Badminton winner
- Seven-times Tony Collins Memorial Trophy winner

1987

- Member of British Team at European Championships at Luhmuhlen

1986

- 1st at Boekelo

1985

- Team gold medal at the European Championships at Burghley

1984

- Team silver at Los Angeles Olympic Games
- 6th Individually at Los Angeles Olympic Games
- 1st Badminton Horse Trials (Beagle Bay)

1983

- 1st Badminton Horse Trials (Regal Realm)
- Team silver at European Championships in Switzerland
- Individual silver at European Championships in Switzerland

1982

- World Champion of Eventing
- Team gold at World Championships at Luhmuhlen

1981

- 1st place Burghley Horse Trials (Beagle Bay)

1980

- 7th place individually at Alternative Olympics in Fontainbleau
- 1st Melbourne—Novice and Open Classes on borrowed horses

1979

- 1st Badminton Horse Trials (Killaire)

1977

- 1st Badminton Horse Trials (George)
- 1st European Championship (George)
- 1st Burghley Horse Trials (George)

1976

- 1st Badminton Horse Trials (Wideawake)
- Member of British Team at Montreal Olympics (Be Fair)

1975

- 1st European Championship (Be Fair)

1973

- 1st Badminton Horse Trials (Be Fair)
- Member of British Team at Kiev
