= Andrew Bennie =

New Zealand equestrian (born 1956)

Medal record

Equestrian

Representing New Zealand

Olympic Games
Bronze medal – third place	1988 Seoul	Team eventing

Andrew Bennie (born 18 August 1956) is a New Zealand horseman who won a bronze medal at the 1988 Summer Olympics in Seoul. Bennie, riding Grayshott, was in the New Zealand Three Day Event Team which finished third, along with Tinks Pottinger, Margaret Knighton and Mark Todd. In the individual Three Day Event at the same Olympics he finished 20th. Bennie had also competed in the individual Three Day Event at the 1984 Summer Olympics in Los Angeles, finishing 37th.

Bennie was born in Auckland. He now lives in England making his living from competing, training horses and teaching riding.
