= Ian Stark =

Scottish equestrian (born 1954)

Medal record

Equestrian

Representing Great Britain

Olympic Games
Silver medal – second place	1984 Los Angeles	Team eventing
Silver medal – second place	1988 Seoul	Individual eventing
Silver medal – second place	1988 Seoul	Team eventing
Silver medal – second place	2000 Sydney	Team eventing

World Championships
Gold medal – first place	1986 Gawler	Team eventing
Silver medal – second place	1990 Stockholm	Individual eventing
Silver medal – second place	1990 Stockholm	Team eventing

European Championships
Gold medal – first place	1985 Burghley	Team eventing
Gold medal – first place	1987 Luhmuhlen	Team eventing
Gold medal – first place	1989 Burghley	Team eventing
Gold medal – first place	1991 Punchestown	Individual eventing
Gold medal – first place	1991 Punchestown	Team eventing
Gold medal – first place	1997 Burghley	Team eventing
Gold medal – first place	1999 Luhmuhlen	Team eventing
Silver medal – second place	1987 Luhmuhlen	Individual eventing
Bronze medal – third place	1985 Burghley	Individual eventing

Ian David Stark, OBE (born 22 February 1954) is a retired Scottish equestrian who competed in the sport of eventing. Stark was born in Galashiels in the Borders in 1954 and began riding horses at the age of 10.

Stark was inducted into the Scottish Sports Hall of Fame in March 2010.

== Career ==
In 1984 Stark won a silver medal for eventing in the Olympic Games, which were held in Los Angeles. In 2000 Stark won a silver team medal for eventing in the Olympic Games held in Sydney, Australia.

Other accomplishments are:

- Two silver medals in the Seoul Games of 1988
- Two silver medals in the World Championships in 1990
- Two gold medals in the European Eventing Championships in 1991
- A gold in the European Eventing Championships in 1997
- Winner of the Badminton Horse Trials in 1999

Stark retired from competition upon completing the 2007 Kentucky Three Day Event aboard Full Circle II.

== Honours ==
Stark was awarded the MBE in 1989 and OBE in 2000.
