= David Foster (equestrian) =

Irish equestrian

Personal information
- Nationality: Irish
- Born: 26 March 1955 Enfield, Ireland
- Died: 13 April 1998 (aged 43) Rathmolyon, Ireland

Sport
- Sport: Equestrian
Medal record
Equestrian
Representing Ireland
European Championships
Gold medal – first place	1979 Luhmühlen	Team eventing

David Foster (26 March 1955 – 13 April 1998) was an Irish equestrian. He competed at the 1984 Summer Olympics, the 1988 Summer Olympics and the 1996 Summer Olympics.

Foster was killed in a riding accident in 1998. The David Foster Injured Riders Fund, whose sole purpose is to financially help injured riders, was formed the following year by his wife Sneezy.
