= Bartolo Ambrosione =

Italian equestrian

Personal information
- Nationality: Italian
- Born: 22 May 1959 (age 66); Brescia, Italy

Sport
- Sport: Equestrian

Bartolo Ambrosione (born 22 May 1959) is an Italian equestrian. He competed at the 1984 Summer Olympics and the 1988 Summer Olympics.

At Los Angeles 1984, he placed # 30 in individual Equestrian Eventing, and competed in the team event where Italy placed # 7.

At Seoul in 1988, he placed # 11 in individual Equestrian Eventing, and competed in the team event where Italy placed # DNF.
