= Equestrian events at the 1984 Summer Olympics =

Equestrian at the Games of the XXIII Olympiad
- Venue: Santa Anita Racetrack; Fairbanks Ranch Country Club
- Dates: 29 July – 12 August 1984
- No. of events: 6
- Competitors: 157 from 30 nations

The equestrian events at the 1984 Los Angeles Olympics included show jumping, dressage and eventing.

The equestrian sports were held primarily at Santa Anita Racetrack, which offered stabling for up to 2100 horses, a grandstand with almost 16000 seats, and was managed by experienced horsemen. Fairbanks Ranch Country Club in San Diego County hosted the endurance portions of the three-day event.

Horses were required to be at least six years old. Up to 14 riders and 22 horses were permitted per country. In total 157 entries from thirty nations (Argentina, Australia, Austria, Belgium, Bermuda, Brazil, Canada, Chile, Denmark, Ecuador, Finland, France, the Federal Republic of Germany (FRG), Great Britain, Guatemala, Ireland, Italy, Japan, Mexico, the Netherlands, New Zealand, Norway, Peru, Puerto Rico, Spain, Sweden, Switzerland, the United States, the Virgin Islands, and Yugoslavia) competed.

Due to the boycott, the Soviet Union and its satellite nations were absent, although that had no impact on the competition, as all of the top riders were from the competing nations.

== Medal summary ==
Games	Gold	Silver	Bronze
Individual dressage	Reiner Klimke and Ahlerich; West Germany	Anne Grethe Jensen and Marzog; Denmark	Otto Hofer and Limandus; Switzerland
Team dressage	West Germany; Reiner Klimke and Ahlerich; Uwe Sauer and Montevideo; Herbert Krug and Muscadeur	Switzerland; Otto Hofer and Limandus; Christine Stückelberger and Tansanit; Amy-Cathérine de Bary and Aintree	Sweden; Ulla Håkansson and Flamingo; Louise Nathhorst and Inferno; Ingamay Bylund and Aleks
Individual eventing	Mark Todd and Charisma; New Zealand	Karen Stives and Ben Arthur; United States	Virginia Holgate and Priceless; Great Britain
Team eventing	United States; Michael Plumb and Blue Stone; Karen Stives and Ben Arthur; Torrance Fleischmann and Finvarra; Bruce Davidson and JJ Babu	Great Britain; Virginia Leng and Priceless; Ian Stark and Oxford Blue; Diana Clapham and Windjammer; Lucinda Green and Regal Realm	West Germany; Bettina Overesch and Peacetime; Burkhard Tesdorpf and Freedom; Claus Erhorn and Fair Lady; Dietmar Hogrefe and Foliant
Individual jumping	Joseph Fargis and Touch of Class; United States	Conrad Homfeld and Abdullah; United States	Heidi Robbiani and Jessica V Switzerland
Team jumping	United States; Joseph Fargis and Touch of Class; Conrad Homfeld and Abdullah; Leslie Howard and Albany; Melanie Smith and Calypso	Great Britain; Michael Whitaker and Overton Amanda; John Whitaker and Ryan's Son; Steven Smith and Shining Example; Timothy Grubb and Linky	West Germany; Paul Schockemöhle and Deister; Peter Luther and Livius; Franke Sloothaak and Farmer; Fritz Ligges and Ramzes

== Medal table ==
Rank	Nation	Gold	Silver	Bronze	Total
1	United States	3	2	0	5
2	West Germany	2	0	2	4
3	New Zealand	1	0	0	1
4	Great Britain	0	2	1	3
5	Switzerland	0	1	2	3
6	Denmark	0	1	0	1
7	Sweden	0	0	1	1
Totals (7 entries)		6	6	6	18

== Officials ==
Appointment of officials was as follows:

Dressage

- (United States) Donald Thackeray (Ground Jury President)
- (United Kingdom) Johanna Hall (Ground Jury Member)
- (Switzerland) Wolfgang Niggli (Ground Jury Member)
- (Soviet Union) Elena Kondratieva (Ground Jury Member)
- (West Germany) Heinz Schütte (Ground Jury Member)

Jumping

- (Denmark) Knud Larsen (Ground Jury President)
- (Poland) Eryk Brabec (Ground Jury Member)
- (Netherlands) Jaap Rijks (Ground Jury Member)
- (United States) John Ammermann (Ground Jury Member)
- (United States) Bertalan de Nemethy (Course Designer)
- (West Germany) Arno Gego (Technical Delegate)

Eventing

- (Switzerland) Anton Bühler (Ground Jury President)
- (United States) Jonathan Burton (Ground Jury Member)
- (France) François Lucas (Ground Jury Member)
- (United States) Neil Ayer (Course Designer)
- (Canada) Ewen B. Graham (Technical Delegate)

== See also ==
- Equestrian at the Friendship Games
