= Equestrian at the 2012 Summer Olympics – Individual jumping =

Equestrian at the Olympics

Individual jumping at the Games of the XXX Olympiad
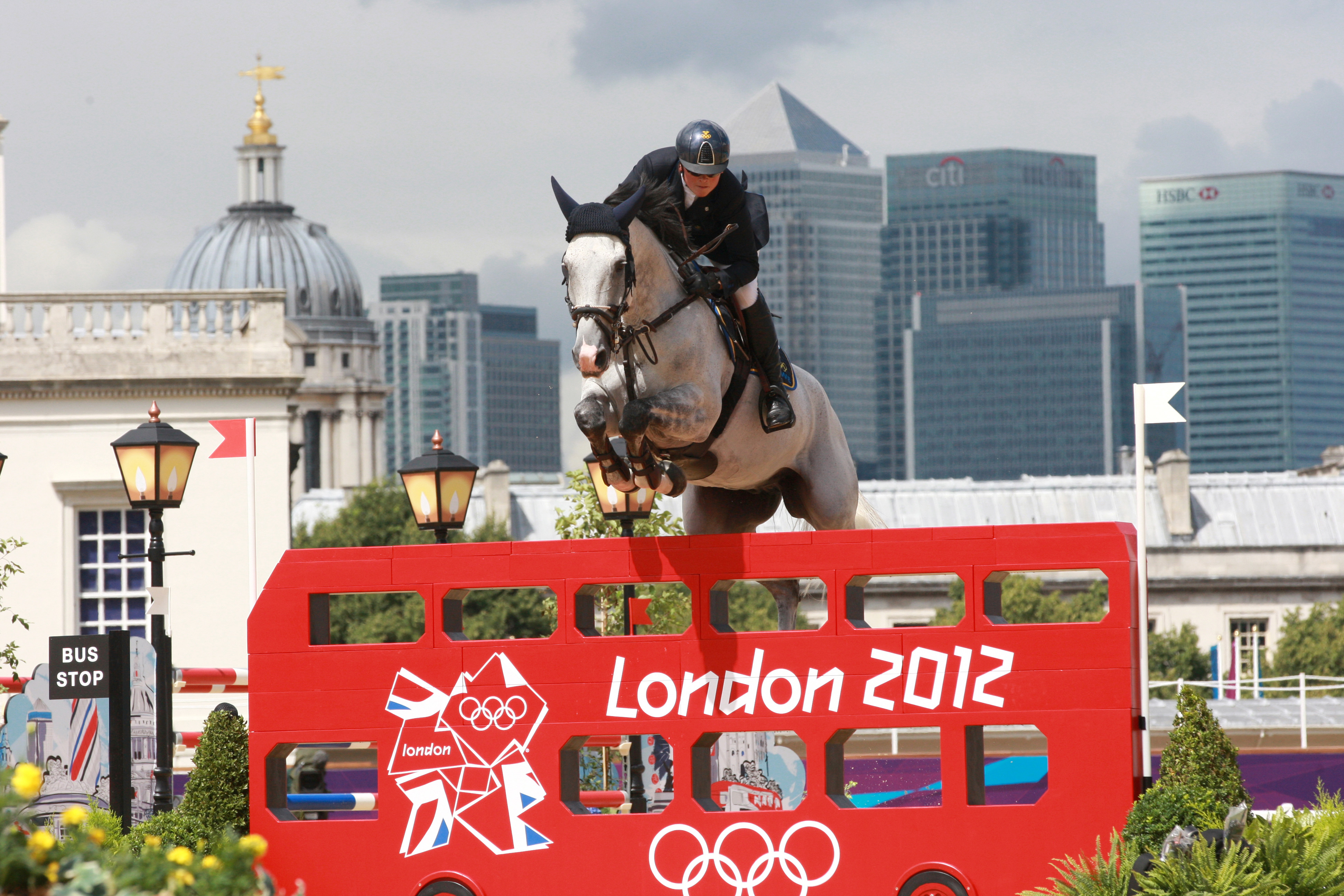
- A competitor (Lisen Bratt) making a jump
- Venue: Greenwich Park
- Dates: 4–8 August 2012
- Competitors: 75 from 26 nations
- Winning total: 0 faults

Medalists
| 1st place, gold medalist(s) | | Steve Guerdat; Switzerland |
| 2nd place, silver medalist(s) | | Gerco Schroder; Netherlands |
| 3rd place, bronze medalist(s) | | Cian O'Connor; Ireland |

The individual jumping in equestrian at the 2012 Olympic Games in London was held at Greenwich Park from 4 to 8 August. Like all other equestrian events, the jumping competition was mixed gender, with both male and female athletes competing in the same division. There were 75 competitors from 26 nations. The event was won by Steve Guerdat of Switzerland, the nation's first victory in individual jumping since 1924 and second overall (tying the United States for fourth-most). Gerco Schroder of the Netherlands took silver. Cian O'Connor of Ireland, who had been stripped of a gold medal in the event in 2004, earned bronze—Ireland's first medal in the event.

== Background ==
This was the 24th appearance of the event, which had first been held at the 1900 Summer Olympics and has been held at every Summer Olympics at which equestrian sports have been featured (that is, excluding 1896, 1904, and 1908). It is the oldest event on the current programme, the only one that was held in 1900.

Nine of the top 14 riders (including ties for 9th place) from the 2008 Games returned: gold medalist Eric Lamaze of Canada, silver medalist (and 2004 fourth-place finisher) Rolf-Göran Bengtsson of Sweden, bronze medalist Beezie Madden of the United States, fourth-place finisher Meredith Michaels-Beerbaum of Germany, fifth-place finisher McLain Ward of the United States, seventh-place finisher Marc Houtzager of the Netherlands, and ninth-place finishers Steve Guerdat of Switzerland, Edwina Alexander of Australia, and Jos Lansink of Belgium. Also returning were Cian O'Connor of Ireland, who had taken gold in 2004 until being stripped of it due to a doping violation, and Rodrigo Pessoa of Brazil, the beneficiary of that disqualification in taking gold in 2004 who had himself had a fifth-place finish in 2008 wiped out by a doping violation. The reigning World Champion was Philippe Le Jeune of Belgium; Lansink (2006) and Pessoa (1998) were also former World Champions. The #1-ranked rider, and European champion, was Bengtsson; he was a favorite along with Pius Schwizer and Steve Guerdat of Switzerland and Nick Skelton of Great Britain.

Syria made its debut in the event. France and the United States both competed for the 21st time, tied for most of any nation.

== Qualification ==
Each National Olympic Committee (NOC) could qualify up to 4 horse and rider pairs; there were a total of 75 quota places. Each of the 15 nations qualified for the team jumping could enter 4 pairs in the individual event. The qualified teams were:

- Host Great Britain
- 5 teams from the World Equestrian Games: Germany, France, Belgium, Brazil, and Canada
- 3 teams from the European Jumping Championship: the Netherlands, Sweden, and Switzerland
- 3 teams from the Pan American Games: the United States, Mexico, and Chile
- 1 team from the World Games from regional groups C or G: Australia
- 1 team from the qualification event for groups C or G: Ukraine
- 1 team from the World Games and the qualification event from group F: Saudi Arabia

There were also 15 individual qualification places, with NOCs not earning team spots able to earn up to 2 individual spots. All of these places were assigned by regional groups:

- Groups A and B had three spots, assigned through rankings
- Group C had two spots, assigned through rankings
- Group D had one spot and Group E had 4 spots, assigned through the Pan American Games
- Group F had three spots, two assigned through the World Games and one through a qualification event
- Group G had two spots, one assigned through the World Games and one through a qualification event

== Competition format ==
Five rounds of jumping were conducted, in two stages. The first three rounds made up the qualifications, with cuts between each round. The top 60 advanced to the second round; the top 45 advanced to the third round. The second and third rounds were also used for the team jumping event. Following the qualifications, the top 35 pairs moved on to the final round. Only the top 20 pairs advanced to the second of the two final rounds. Final rankings were based on the sum of scores from both rounds of the final stage. A jump-off would be held to break a tie for any of the medal positions.

== Schedule ==
All times are British Summer Time (UTC+1)

| Date | Time | Round |
|---|---|---|
| Saturday, 4 August 2012 | 10:30 | Qualification round 1 |
| Sunday, 5 August 2012 | 11:00 | Qualification round 2 |
| Monday, 6 August 2012 | 14:00 | Qualification round 3 |
| Wednesday, 8 August 2012 | 12:00; 16:00 | Final round A Final round B |

== Results ==
=== Qualifying round ===
==== Round 1 ====
The first qualifying round was run on a relatively easy course with a length of 510 m and an allowed time of 1:22.

| Rank | Rider | Nation | Horse | Penalties | | | Notes |
| Rank | Rider | Nation | Horse | Jump | Time | Total | Notes |
|---|---|---|---|---|---|---|---|
| 1 | Jur Vrieling | Netherlands | Bubalu | 0 | 0 | 0 | Q |
| 1 | Alvaro Alfonso de Miranda Neto | Brazil | Rahmannshof's Bogen | 0 | 0 | 0 | Q |
| 1 | Nick Skelton | Great Britain | Big Star | 0 | 0 | 0 | Q |
| 1 | Simon Delestre | France | Napoli du Ry | 0 | 0 | 0 | Q |
| 1 | Cassio Rivetti | Ukraine | Temple Road | 0 | 0 | 0 | Q |
| 1 | Jens Fredricson | Sweden | Lunatic | 0 | 0 | 0 | Q |
| 1 | Daniel Bluman | Colombia | Sancha La Silla | 0 | 0 | 0 | Q |
| 1 | Steve Guerdat | Switzerland | Nino des Buissonets | 0 | 0 | 0 | Q |
| 1 | McLain Ward | United States | Antares | 0 | 0 | 0 | Q |
| 1 | Philippe Le Jeune | Belgium | Vigo d’Arsouilles | 0 | 0 | 0 | Q |
| 1 | Maikel Van Der Vleuten | Netherlands | Verdi | 0 | 0 | 0 | Q |
| 1 | Abdullah bin Mutaib Al Saud | Saudi Arabia | Davos | 0 | 0 | 0 | Q |
| 1 | Ben Maher | Great Britain | Tripple X | 0 | 0 | 0 | Q |
| 1 | Janne Friederike Meyer | Germany | Lambrasco | 0 | 0 | 0 | Q |
| 1 | Alberto Michan Halbinger | Mexico | Rosalia La Silla | 0 | 0 | 0 | Q |
| 1 | Paul Estermann | Switzerland | Castlefield Eclipse | 0 | 0 | 0 | Q |
| 1 | Julia Hargreaves | Australia | Vedor | 0 | 0 | 0 | Q |
| 1 | Marc Houtzager | Netherlands | Tamino | 0 | 0 | 0 | Q |
| 1 | José Roberto Fernández Filho | Brazil | Maestro St Lois | 0 | 0 | 0 | Q |
| 1 | Eric Lamaze | Canada | Derly Chin de Muze | 0 | 0 | 0 | Q |
| 1 | Kevin Staut | France | Silvana | 0 | 0 | 0 | Q |
| 1 | Henrik von Eckermann | Sweden | Allerdings | 0 | 0 | 0 | Q |
| 1 | Meredith Michaels-Beerbaum | Germany | Bella Donna | 0 | 0 | 0 | Q |
| 1 | Werner Muff | Switzerland | Kiamon | 0 | 0 | 0 | Q |
| 1 | Edwina Tops-Alexander | Australia | Itot du Chateau | 0 | 0 | 0 | Q |
| 1 | Rich Fellers | United States | Flexible | 0 | 0 | 0 | Q |
| 1 | Dirk Demeersman | Belgium | Bufero van Het Panishof | 0 | 0 | 0 | Q |
| 1 | Gerco Schroder | Netherlands | London | 0 | 0 | 0 | Q |
| 1 | Taizo Sugitani | Japan | Avenzio | 0 | 0 | 0 | Q |
| 1 | Rolf-Göran Bengtsson | Sweden | Casall | 0 | 0 | 0 | Q |
| 1 | Cian O'Connor | Ireland | Blue Loyd 12 | 0 | 0 | 0 | Q |
| 1 | Jos Lansink | Belgium | Valentina Van 't Heike | 0 | 0 | 0 | Q |
| 33 | Kamal Bahamdan | Saudi Arabia | Delphi | 0 | 1 | 1 | Q |
| 33 | Marcus Ehning | Germany | Plot Blue | 0 | 1 | 1 | Q |
| 33 | Jillian Terceira | Bermuda | Bernadien van Westuur | 0 | 1 | 1 | Q |
| 33 | Pénélope Leprevost | France | Mylord Carthago | 0 | 1 | 1 | Q |
| 33 | Rodrigo Díaz | Colombia | Royal Vinckenburg | 0 | 1 | 1 | Q |
| 33 | Reed Kessler | United States | Cylana | 0 | 1 | 1 | Q |
| 33 | Ahmad Saber Hamcho | Syria | Wonderboy | 0 | 1 | 1 | Q |
| 33 | Rodrigo Pessoa | Brazil | Rebozo | 0 | 1 | 1 | Q |
| 41 | Ramzy Al Duhami | Saudi Arabia | Bayard van de Villa There | 0 | 2 | 2 | Q |
| 42 | Nicolas Pizarro | Mexico | Crossing Jordan | 4 | 0 | 4 | Q |
| 42 | Grégory Wathelet | Belgium | Cadjanne Z | 4 | 0 | 4 | Q |
| 42 | Billy Twomey | Ireland | Tinka’s Serenade | 4 | 0 | 4 | Q |
| 42 | Scott Brash | Great Britain | Hello Sanctos | 4 | 0 | 4 | Q |
| 42 | Bjorn Nagel | Ukraine | Niack de l’Abbaye | 4 | 0 | 4 | Q |
| 42 | Ian Millar | Canada | Star Power | 4 | 0 | 4 | Q |
| 42 | Jose Maria Larocca | Argentina | Royal Power | 4 | 0 | 4 | Q |
| 42 | Olivier Guillon | France | Lord de Theize | 4 | 0 | 4 | Q |
| 42 | Katharina Offel | Ukraine | Vivant | 4 | 0 | 4 | Q |
| 42 | Carlos Milthaler | Chile | Hyo Altanero | 4 | 0 | 4 | Q |
| 42 | James Paterson-Robinson | Australia | Lanosso | 4 | 0 | 4 | Q |
| 53 | Jill Henselwood | Canada | George | 4 | 1 | 5 | Q |
| 53 | Jamal Rahimov | Azerbaijan | Warrior | 4 | 1 | 5 | Q |
| 53 | Karim El Zoghby | Egypt | Wervel Wind | 4 | 1 | 5 | Q |
| 53 | Rodrigo Carrasco | Chile | Or de la Charboniere | 4 | 1 | 5 | Q |
| 53 | Federico Fernandez | Mexico | Victoria | 4 | 1 | 5 | Q |
| 58 | Tomás Couve | Chile | Underwraps | 4 | 2 | 6 | Q |
| 58 | Abdullah Waleed Sharbatly | Saudi Arabia | Sultan | 4 | 2 | 6 | Q |
| 60 | Samuel Parot | Chile | Al Calypso | 8 | 0 | 8 | Q |
| 60 | Tiffany Foster | Canada | Victor | 8 | 0 | 8 | Q |
| 60 | Luciana Diniz | Portugal | Lennox | 8 | 0 | 8 | Q |
| 60 | Pius Schwizer | Switzerland | Carlina IV | 8 | 0 | 8 | Q |
| 64 | Alejandro Madorno | Argentina | Milano de Flore | 8 | 1 | 9 | |
| 65 | Peter Charles | Great Britain | Vindicat | 8 | 2 | 10 | |
| 65 | Vladimir Tuganov | Russia | Lancero | 8 | 2 | 10 | |
| 67 | Ibrahim Hani Bisharat | Jordan | Vrieda O | 12 | 0 | 12 | |
| 67 | Jaime Azcarraga | Mexico | Gangster | 12 | 0 | 12 | |
| 69 | Christian Ahlmann | Germany | Codex One | 12 | 3 | 15 | |
| 70 | Oleksandr Onyshchenko | Ukraine | Comte d'Arsouilles | 16 | 2 | 18 | |
| 71 | Reiko Takeda | Japan | Ari | 20 | 2 | 22 | |
| 72 | Lisen Fredricson | Sweden | Matrix | Elim. | | 42 | Fall |
| 72 | Elizabeth Madden | United States | Via Volo | Elim. | | 42 | Two refusals |
| 72 | Carlos Ribas | Brazil | Wilexo | Elim. | | 42 | Two refusals |
| 72 | Matt Williams | Australia | Watch Me | Elim. | | 42 | Two refusals |

==== Round 2 ====
The course for the second round was 550 m long with an allowed time of 1:28.

| Rank | Rider | Nation | Horse | Penalties | | | | Notes |
| Rank | Rider | Nation | Horse | Jump | Time | Round 1 | Total | Notes |
|---|---|---|---|---|---|---|---|---|
| 1 | Nick Skelton | Great Britain | Big Star | 0 | 0 | 0 | 0 | Q |
| 1 | Abdullah bin Mutaib Al Saud | Saudi Arabia | Davos | 0 | 0 | 0 | 0 | Q |
| 1 | Ben Maher | Great Britain | Tripple X | 0 | 0 | 0 | 0 | Q |
| 1 | Edwina Tops-Alexander | Australia | Itot du Chateau | 0 | 0 | 0 | 0 | Q |
| 1 | Alberto Michan Halbinger | Mexico | Rosalia la Silla | 0 | 0 | 0 | 0 | Q |
| 1 | Alvaro Alfonso de Miranda Neto | Brazil | Rahmannshof's Bogen | 0 | 0 | 0 | 0 | Q |
| 1 | Maikel Van Der Vleuten | Netherlands | Verdi | 0 | 0 | 0 | 0 | Q |
| 1 | Paul Estermann | Switzerland | Castlefield Eclipse | 0 | 0 | 0 | 0 | Q |
| 1 | Marc Houtzager | Netherlands | Tamino | 0 | 0 | 0 | 0 | Q |
| 1 | Henrik von Eckermann | Sweden | Allerdings | 0 | 0 | 0 | 0 | Q |
| 1 | Rich Fellers | United States | Flexible | 0 | 0 | 0 | 0 | Q |
| 1 | Rolf-Göran Bengtsson | Sweden | Casall | 0 | 0 | 0 | 0 | Q |
| 13 | Daniel Bluman | Colombia | Sancha | 0 | 1 | 0 | 1 | Q |
| 13 | Eric Lamaze | Canada | Derly Chin de Muze | 0 | 1 | 0 | 1 | Q |
| 15 | Kamal Bahamdan | Saudi Arabia | Delphi | 0 | 1 | 1 | 2 | Q |
| 15 | Ramzy Al Duhami | Saudi Arabia | Bayard van de Villa There | 0 | 0 | 2 | 2 | Q |
| 17 | Taizo Sugitani | Japan | Avenzio | 4 | 0 | 0 | 4 | Q |
| 17 | Ian Millar | Canada | Star Power | 0 | 0 | 4 | 4 | Q |
| 17 | McLain Ward | United States | Antares | 4 | 0 | 0 | 4 | Q |
| 17 | Steve Guerdat | Switzerland | Nino des Buissonets | 4 | 0 | 0 | 4 | Q |
| 17 | Janne Friederike Meyer | Germany | Lambrasco | 4 | 0 | 0 | 4 | Q |
| 17 | Jose Roberto Reynoso Fernandez Filho | Brazil | Maestro St Lois | 4 | 0 | 0 | 4 | Q |
| 17 | Kevin Staut | France | Silvana | 4 | 0 | 0 | 4 | Q |
| 17 | Werner Muff | Switzerland | Kiamon | 4 | 0 | 0 | 4 | Q |
| 17 | Gerco Schroder | Netherlands | London | 4 | 0 | 0 | 4 | Q |
| 17 | Jos Lansink | Belgium | Valentina Van 't Heike | 4 | 0 | 0 | 4 | Q |
| 27 | Cassio Rivetti | Ukraine | Temple Road | 4 | 1 | 0 | 5 | Q |
| 27 | Marcus Ehning | Germany | Plot Blue | 4 | 0 | 1 | 5 | Q |
| 27 | Rodrigo Pessoa | Brazil | Rebozo | 4 | 0 | 1 | 5 | Q |
| 30 | Simon Delestre | France | Napoli du Ry | 4 | 2 | 0 | 6 | Q |
| 31 | Luciana Diniz | Portugal | Lennox | 0 | 0 | 8 | 8 | Q |
| 31 | Jose Maria Larocca | Argentina | Royal Power | 4 | 0 | 4 | 8 | Q |
| 31 | Cian O'Connor | Ireland | Blue Loyd 12 | 8 | 0 | 0 | 8 | Q |
| 31 | Nicolas Pizarro | Mexico | Crossing Jordan | 4 | 0 | 4 | 8 | Q |
| 31 | James Paterson-Robinson | Australia | Lanosso | 4 | 0 | 4 | 8 | Q |
| 31 | Julia Hargreaves | Australia | Vedor | 8 | 0 | 0 | 8 | Q |
| 31 | Bjorn Nagel | Ukraine | Niack de l'Abbaye | 4 | 0 | 4 | 8 | Q |
| 31 | Scott Brash | Great Britain | Hello Sanctos | 4 | 0 | 4 | 8 | Q |
| 31 | Jur Vrieling | Netherlands | Bubalu | 8 | 0 | 0 | 8 | Q |
| 31 | Jens Fredricson | Sweden | Lunatic | 8 | 0 | 0 | 8 | Q |
| 31 | Philippe Le Jeune | Belgium | Vigo d'Arsouilles | 8 | 0 | 0 | 8 | Q |
| 31 | Grégory Wathelet | Belgium | Cadjanne Z | 4 | 0 | 4 | 8 | Q |
| 31 | Meredith Michaels-Beerbaum | Germany | Bella Donna | 8 | 0 | 0 | 8 | Q |
| 31 | Dirk Demeersman | Belgium | Bufero van Het Panishof | 8 | 0 | 0 | 8 | Q |
| 31 | Olivier Guillon | France | Lord de Theize | 4 | 0 | 4 | 8 | Q |
| 31 | Pius Schwizer | Switzerland | Carlina IV | 0 | 0 | 8 | 8 | Q |
| 47 | Jillian Terceira | Bermuda | Bernadien van Westuur | 8 | 0 | 1 | 9 | |
| 47 | Jill Henselwood | Canada | George | 4 | 0 | 5 | 9 | |
| 47 | Pénélope Leprevost | France | Mylord Carthago | 8 | 0 | 1 | 9 | |
| 47 | Reed Kessler | United States | Cylana | 8 | 0 | 1 | 9 | |
| 51 | Karim El Zoghby | Egypt | Wervel Wind | 4 | 1 | 5 | 10 | |
| 51 | Abdullah Waleed Sharbatly | Saudi Arabia | Sultan | 4 | 0 | 6 | 10 | |
| 53 | Rodrigo Diaz | Colombia | Royal Vinckenburg | 8 | 2 | 1 | 11 | |
| 53 | Tomas Couve Correa | Chile | Underwraps | 4 | 1 | 6 | 11 | |
| 53 | Federico Fernandez | Mexico | Victoria | 4 | 2 | 5 | 11 | |
| 56 | Billy Twomey | Ireland | Tinka's Serenade | 8 | 0 | 4 | 12 | |
| 56 | Carlos Milthaler | Chile | Hyo Altanero | 8 | 0 | 4 | 12 | |
| 58 | Katharina Offel | Ukraine | Vivant | 12 | 0 | 4 | 16 | |
| 59 | Samuel Parot | Chile | Al Calypso | 8 | 1 | 8 | 17 | |
| 60 | Jamal Rahimov | Azerbaijan | Warrior | 12 | 1 | 5 | 18 | |
| 61 | Rodrigo Carrasco | Chile | Or de la Charboniere | 16 | 1 | 5 | 22 | |
| 62 | Ahmad Saber Hamcho | Syria | Wonderboy | 28 | 1 | 1 | 30 | |
| — | Tiffany Foster | Canada | Victor | DNS | | 8 | DNF | Injured horse |

==== Round 3 ====
The course for the third round was 550 meters long (with 13 fences) with an allowed time of 1:28.

Bengtsson withdrew from the final when his horse, Casall, turned up lame the morning of the final. Two riders (Muff and Vrieling) were ineligible as the fourth-best riders from their nations. The qualifying rank thus went from 35 to 38. A three-way tie for 38th resulted in all three advancing, for a total of 37 finalists.

| Rank | Rider | Nation | Horse | Penalties | | | | Notes |
| Rank | Rider | Nation | Horse | Jump | Time | Round 1+2 | Total | Notes |
|---|---|---|---|---|---|---|---|---|
| 1 | Nick Skelton | Great Britain | Big Star | 0 | 0 | 0 | 0 | Q |
| 1 | Maikel Van Der Vleuten | Netherlands | Verdi | 0 | 0 | 0 | 0 | Q |
| 1 | Marc Houtzager | Netherlands | Tamino | 0 | 0 | 0 | 0 | Q |
| 4 | Edwina Tops-Alexander | Australia | Itot du Chateau | 4 | 0 | 0 | 4 | Q |
| 4 | Abdullah bin Mutaib Al Saud | Saudi Arabia | Davos | 4 | 0 | 0 | 4 | Q |
| 4 | Ben Maher | Great Britain | Tripple X | 4 | 0 | 0 | 4 | Q |
| 7 | Marcus Ehning | Germany | Plot Blue | 0 | 0 | 5 | 5 | Q |
| 7 | Daniel Bluman | Colombia | Sancha | 4 | 0 | 1 | 5 | Q |
| 9 | Ramzy Al Duhami | Saudi Arabia | Bayard van de Villa There | 4 | 0 | 2 | 6 | Q |
| 10 | Kamal Bahamdan | Saudi Arabia | Delphi | 5 | 1 | 2 | 7 | Q |
| 11 | Kevin Staut | France | Silvana | 4 | 0 | 4 | 8 | Q |
| 11 | Jos Lansink | Belgium | Valentina Van 't Heike | 4 | 0 | 4 | 8 | Q |
| 11 | Alvaro Alfonso de Miranda Neto | Brazil | Rahmannshof's Bogen | 8 | 0 | 0 | 8 | Q |
| 11 | Steve Guerdat | Switzerland | Nino des Buissonets | 4 | 0 | 4 | 8 | Q |
| 11 | Paul Estermann | Switzerland | Castlefield Eclipse | 8 | 0 | 0 | 8 | Q |
| 11 | Scott Brash | Great Britain | Hello Sanctos | 0 | 0 | 8 | 8 | Q |
| 11 | Rich Fellers | United States | Flexible | 8 | 0 | 0 | 8 | Q |
| 11 | Ian Millar | Canada | Star Power | 4 | 0 | 4 | 8 | Q |
| 11 | Gerco Schroder | Netherlands | London | 4 | 0 | 4 | 8 | Q |
| 11 | Rolf-Göran Bengtsson | Sweden | Casall | 8 | 0 | 0 | 8 | Q, withdrew |
| 11 | Pius Schwizer | Switzerland | Carlina IV | 0 | 0 | 8 | 8 | Q |
| 22 | Meredith Michaels-Beerbaum | Germany | Bella Donna | 0 | 1 | 8 | 9 | Q |
| 22 | Alberto Michan Halbinger | Mexico | Rosalia la Silla | 8 | 1 | 0 | 9 | Q |
| 22 | Eric Lamaze | Canada | Derly Chin de Muze | 8 | 0 | 1 | 9 | Q |
| 25 | Rodrigo Pessoa | Brazil | Rebozo | 4 | 1 | 5 | 10 | Q |
| 26 | Luciana Diniz | Portugal | Lennox | 4 | 0 | 8 | 12 | Q |
| 26 | Grégory Wathelet | Belgium | Cadjanne Z | 4 | 0 | 8 | 12 | Q |
| 26 | Taizo Sugitani | Japan | Avenzio | 8 | 0 | 4 | 12 | Q |
| 26 | McLain Ward | United States | Antares | 8 | 0 | 4 | 12 | Q |
| 26 | Jens Fredricson | Sweden | Lunatic | 4 | 0 | 8 | 12 | Q |
| 31 | Julia Hargreaves | Australia | Vedor | 4 | 1 | 8 | 13 | Q |
| 32 | Simon Delestre | France | Napoli du Ry | 8 | 0 | 6 | 14 | Q |
| 33 | Olivier Guillon | France | Lord de Theize | 8 | 0 | 8 | 16 | Q |
| 33 | Henrik von Eckermann | Sweden | Allerdings | 16 | 0 | 0 | 16 | Q |
| 33 | Werner Muff | Switzerland | Kiamon | 12 | 0 | 4 | 16 | 3/NOC |
| 33 | Jur Vrieling | Netherlands | Bubalu | 8 | 0 | 8 | 16 | 3/NOC |
| 37 | Cassio Rivetti | Ukraine | Temple Road | 12 | 0 | 5 | 17 | Q |
| 38 | Jose Maria Larocca | Argentina | Royal Power | 12 | 0 | 8 | 20 | Q |
| 38 | Cian O'Connor | Ireland | Blue Loyd 12 | 12 | 0 | 8 | 20 | Q |
| 38 | Dirk Demeersman | Belgium | Bufero van Het Panishof | 12 | 0 | 8 | 20 | Q |
| 41 | James Paterson-Robinson | Australia | Lanosso | 12 | 1 | 8 | 21 | |
| 41 | Bjorn Nagel | Ukraine | Niack de l'Abbaye | 12 | 1 | 8 | 21 | |
| 41 | Janne Friederike Meyer | Germany | Lambrasco | 16 | 1 | 4 | 21 | |
| 44 | Nicolas Pizarro | Mexico | Crossing Jordan | 20 | 0 | 8 | 28 | |
| 45 | Jose Roberto Reynoso Fernandez Filho | Brazil | Maestro St Lois | 46 | 0 | 4 | 50 | |
| — | Philippe Le Jeune | Belgium | Vigo d'Arsouilles | DNS | | 8 | DNF | Injured horse |

=== Final round ===
==== Round A ====
O'Connor, who had only reached the final due to Bengtsson's withdrawal, took advantage of the fresh scoring, as one of six riders to clear round A cleanly.

| Rank | Rider | Nation | Horse | Penalties | | | Notes |
| Rank | Rider | Nation | Horse | Jump | Time | Total | Notes |
|---|---|---|---|---|---|---|---|
| 1 | Cian O'Connor | Ireland | Blue Loyd 12 | 0 | 0 | 0 | Q |
| 1 | Olivier Guillon | France | Lord de Theize | 0 | 0 | 0 | Q |
| 1 | Steve Guerdat | Switzerland | Nino des Buissonnets | 0 | 0 | 0 | Q |
| 1 | Scott Brash | Great Britain | Hello Sanctos | 0 | 0 | 0 | Q |
| 1 | Marcus Ehning | Germany | Plot Blue | 0 | 0 | 0 | Q |
| 1 | Nick Skelton | Great Britain | Big Star | 0 | 0 | 0 | Q |
| 7 | Luciana Diniz | Portugal | Lennox | 0 | 1 | 1 | Q |
| 7 | Gerco Schroder | Netherlands | London | 0 | 1 | 1 | Q |
| 7 | Pius Schwizer | Switzerland | Carlina IV | 0 | 1 | 1 | Q |
| 7 | Kamal Bahamdan | Saudi Arabia | Nobless des Tess | 0 | 1 | 1 | Q |
| 11 | Simon Delestre | France | Napoli du Ry | 4 | 0 | 4 | Q |
| 11 | Rodrigo Pessoa | Brazil | Rebozo | 4 | 0 | 4 | Q |
| 11 | Alberto Michan | Mexico | Rosalia la Silla | 4 | 0 | 4 | Q |
| 11 | Alvaro Affonso de Miranda Neto | Brazil | Rahmannshof's Bogeno | 4 | 0 | 4 | Q |
| 11 | Ian Millar | Canada | Star Power | 4 | 0 | 4 | Q |
| 11 | Daniel Bluman | Colombia | Sancha | 4 | 0 | 4 | Q |
| 11 | Edwina Tops-Alexander | Australia | Itot du Chateau | 4 | 0 | 4 | Q |
| 11 | Ben Maher | Great Britain | Tripple X | 4 | 0 | 4 | Q |
| 11 | Marc Houtzager | Netherlands | Tamino | 4 | 0 | 4 | Q |
| 20 | Cassio Rivetti | Ukraine | Temple Road | 4 | 1 | 5 | Q |
| 20 | Paul Estermann | Switzerland | Castlefield Eclipse | 4 | 1 | 5 | Q |
| 20 | Rich Fellers | United States | Flexible | 4 | 1 | 5 | Q |
| 23 | Henrik von Eckermann | Sweden | Allerdings | 8 | 0 | 8 | |
| 23 | Meredith Michaels-Beerbaum | Germany | Bella Donna | 8 | 0 | 8 | |
| 23 | Jos Lansink | Belgium | Valentina Van 't Heike | 8 | 0 | 8 | |
| 26 | Dirk Demeersman | Belgium | Bufero van Het Penishof | 8 | 1 | 9 | |
| 26 | Jens Fredricson | Sweden | Lunatic | 8 | 1 | 9 | |
| 26 | Abdullah bin Mutaib Al Saud | Saudi Arabia | Davos | 8 | 1 | 9 | |
| 29 | Grégory Wathelet | Belgium | Cadjanine Z | 12 | 0 | 12 | |
| 29 | McLain Ward | United States | Antares | 12 | 0 | 12 | |
| 29 | Eric Lamaze | Canada | Derly Chin de Muze | 12 | 0 | 12 | |
| 29 | Ramzy Al Duhami | Saudi Arabia | Bayard van de Villa There | 12 | 0 | 12 | |
| 33 | Taizo Sugitani | Japan | Avenzio | 12 | 2 | 14 | |
| 34 | Kevin Staut | France | Silvana | 16 | 0 | 16 | |
| 35 | Julia Hargreaves | Australia | Vedor | 16 | 1 | 17 | |
| 36 | Jose Maria Larocca | Argentina | Royal Power | 20 | 0 | 20 | |
| — | Maikel van der Vleuten | Netherlands | Verdi | DNF | | | |

==== Round B ====
| Rank | Rider | Nation | Horse | Penalties | | | | Notes |
| Rank | Rider | Nation | Horse | Jump | Time | Round A | Total | Notes |
|---|---|---|---|---|---|---|---|---|
| 1st place, gold medalist(s) | Steve Guerdat | Switzerland | Nino des Buissonnets | 0 | 0 | 0 | 0 | |
| 2 | Gerco Schroder | Netherlands | London | 0 | 0 | 1 | 1 | Q |
| 2 | Cian O'Connor | Ireland | Blue Loyd 12 | 0 | 1 | 0 | 1 | Q |
| 4 | Kamal Bahamdan | Saudi Arabia | Noblesse des Tess | 0 | 1 | 1 | 2 | |
| 5 | Alberto Michan | Mexico | Rosalia la Silla | 0 | 0 | 4 | 4 | |
| 5 | Scott Brash | Great Britain | Hello Sanctos | 4 | 0 | 0 | 4 | |
| 5 | Nick Skelton | Great Britain | Big Star | 4 | 0 | 0 | 4 | |
| 8 | Rich Fellers | United States | Flexible | 0 | 0 | 5 | 5 | |
| 9 | Ian Millar | Canada | Star Power | 4 | 0 | 4 | 8 | |
| 9 | Ben Maher | Great Britain | Tripple X | 4 | 0 | 4 | 8 | |
| 9 | Marc Houtzager | Netherlands | Tamino | 4 | 0 | 4 | 8 | |
| 12 | Cassio Rivetti | Ukraine | Temple Road | 4 | 0 | 5 | 9 | |
| 12 | Alvaro Affonso de Miranda Neto | Brazil | Rahmannshof's Bogeno | 4 | 1 | 4 | 9 | |
| 12 | Pius Schwizer | Switzerland | Carlina IV | 8 | 0 | 1 | 9 | |
| 12 | Olivier Guillon | France | Lord de Theize | 8 | 1 | 0 | 9 | |
| 12 | Marcus Ehning | Germany | Plot Blue | 8 | 1 | 0 | 9 | |
| 17 | Paul Estermann | Switzerland | Castlefield Eclipse | 4 | 1 | 5 | 10 | |
| 17 | Luciana Diniz | Portugal | Lennox | 8 | 1 | 1 | 10 | |
| 19 | Simon Delestre | France | Napoli du Ry | 8 | 0 | 4 | 12 | |
| 20 | Daniel Bluman | Colombia | Sancha | 8 | 1 | 4 | 13 | |
| 20 | Edwina Tops-Alexander | Australia | Itot du Chateau | 8 | 1 | 4 | 13 | |
| 22 | Rodrigo Pessoa | Brazil | Rebozo | 12 | 1 | 4 | 17 | |

==== Silver medal jump-off ====
| Rank | Rider | Nation | Horse | Penalties | Time (s) |
|---|---|---|---|---|---|
| 2nd place, silver medalist(s) | Gerco Schroder | Netherlands | London | 0 | 49.79 |
| 3rd place, bronze medalist(s) | Cian O'Connor | Ireland | Blue Loyd 12 | 4 | 46.64 |
