= Equestrian at the 2012 Summer Olympics – Team jumping =

Team jumping at the Games of the XXX Olympiad
- Venue: Greenwich Park
- Date: 4–6 August 2012
- Competitors: 60 from 15 nations

Medalists
1st place, gold medalist(s)		Scott Brash; Peter Charles; Ben Maher; Nick Skelton	Great Britain
2nd place, silver medalist(s)		Marc Houtzager; Gerco Schroder; Maikel Van Der Vleuten; Jur Vrieling	Netherlands
3rd place, bronze medalist(s)		Ramzy Al Duhami; Abdullah bin Mutaib Al Saud; Kamal Bahamdan; Abdullah Waleed Sharbatly	Saudi Arabia

The team jumping in equestrian at the 2012 Olympic Games in London was held at Greenwich Park from 4 to 6 August.

Great Britain's team consisting of Scott Brash, Peter Charles, Ben Maher and Nick Skelton won the gold medal in a jump-off, the first win in the event for Great Britain since 1952. The Netherlands won silver and Saudi Arabia took bronze — the only medal of the 2012 Games for the latter.

== Competition format ==
Five rounds of jumping were conducted in total. The second and third rounds were used for the team jumping event. Final rankings were based on the sum of scores of the three best riders from both rounds. A jump-off would be held to break a tie for any of the medal positions.

== Schedule ==
All times are British Summer Time (UTC+1)

Date	Time	Round
Saturday, 4 August 2012	10:30	Qualification
Sunday, 5 August 2012	11:00	Team round 1
Monday, 6 August 2012	14:00; 16:37	Team round 2 Jump-off

== Participants ==
Rank	Name	Round 1		Round 2		Team total penalties	Jump-off			
Rank	Name	Penalties		Penalties		Team total penalties	Penalties		Time	
Rank	Name	Individual	Team	Individual	Team	Team total penalties	Individual	Team	Individual	Team
1st place, gold medalist(s)	Great Britain; Scott Brash; Peter Charles; Ben Maher; Nick Skelton	4; ~~8~~; 0; 0	4	0; ~~5~~; 4; 0	4	8	~~4~~; 0; 0; 0	0	48.01; 61.27; 48.14; 47.27	
2nd place, silver medalist(s)	Netherlands; Marc Houtzager; Gerco Schroder; Maikel Van Der Vleuten; Jur Vrieling	0; 4; 0; ~~8~~	4	0; 4; 0; ~~8~~	4	8	4 – ~~8~~; 0	4	52.40 – 48.18; 48.54	
3rd place, bronze medalist(s)	Saudi Arabia; Ramzy Al Duhami; Abdullah bin Mutaib Al Saud; Kamal Bahamdan; Abdullah Waleed Sharbatly	0; 0; 1; ~~4~~	1	4; 4; 5; ~~6~~	13	14				
4	Switzerland; Paul Estermann; Steve Guerdat; Werner Muff; Pius Schwizer	0; ~~4~~; 4; 0	4	8; 4; ~~12~~; 0	12	16				
5	Canada; Tiffany Foster; Jill Henselwood; Eric Lamaze; Ian Millar	~~DSQ~~; 4; 1; 0	5	~~DSQ~~; 9; 8; 4	21	26				
=6	Sweden; Rolf-Göran Bengtsson; Lisen Fredricson; Jens Fredricson; Henrik von Eckermann	0; 4; ~~8~~; 0	4	8; 12; 4; ~~16~~	24	28				
=6	United States; Rich Fellers; Reed Kessler; Beezie Madden; McLain Ward	0; ~~8~~; 4; 4	8	8; ~~12~~; 4; 8	20	28				
8	Brazil; Álvaro de Miranda Neto; Carlos Motta Ribas; Rodrigo Pessoa; Jose Roberto Reynoso Fernandez Filho	0 – 4; 4	8	8 – 5; 46	59	67				
9	Mexico; Jaime Azcarragua; Federico Fernandez; Alberto Michan Halbinger; Nicolas Pizarro	~~12~~; 6; 0; 4	10							
=10	Australia; Julia Hargreaves; James Paterson-Robinson; Edwina Tops-Alexander; Matt Williams	8; 4; 0; ~~12~~	12							
=10	Germany; Christian Ahlmann; Marcus Ehning; Janne Friederike Meyer; Meredith Michaels-Beerbaum	4; 4; 4; ~~8~~	12							
12	France; Simon Delestre; Olivier Guillon; Pénélope Leprevost; Kevin Staut	6; 4; ~~8~~; 4	14							
13	Belgium; Dirk Demeersman; Jos Lansink; Philippe le Jeune; Grégory Wathelet	8; 4; ~~8~~; 4	16							
14	Ukraine; Björn Nagel; Katharina Offel; Oleksandr Onyshchenko; Cassio Rivetti	4; 12; ~~23~~; 5	21							
15	Chile; Rodrigo Carrasco; Tomas Couve Correa; Carlos Milthaler; Samuel Parot	~~17~~; 5; 8; 9	22							

== Medalists ==
Gold:		Silver:		Bronze:	
Great Britain		Netherlands		Saudi Arabia	
Scott Brash	Hello Sanctos	Marc Houtzager	Tamino	Ramzy Al Duhami	Bayard van de Villa There
Peter Charles	Vindicat	Gerco Schroder	London	Abdullah bin Mutaib Al Saud	Davos
Ben Maher	Tripple X	Maikel Van Der Vleuten	Verdi	Kamal Bahamdan	Noblesse des Tess
Nick Skelton	Big Star	Jur Vrieling	Bubalo	Abdullah Waleed Sharbatly	Sultan
