= Switzerland at the 2012 Summer Olympics =

- IOC code: SUI
- NOC: Swiss Olympic Association
- Website: www.swissolympic.ch (in German and French)

in London
- Competitors: 103 in 18 sports
- Flag bearers: Stanislas Wawrinka (opening); Nicola Spirig (closing)
- Medals Ranked 33rd: Gold 2 Silver 2 Bronze 0 Total 4

Summer Olympics appearances (overview)
- 1896; 1900; ~~1904~~; 1908; 1912; 1920; 1924; 1928; 1932; 1936; 1948; 1952; 1956; 1960; 1964; 1968; 1972; 1976; 1980; 1984; 1988; 1992; 1996; 2000; 2004; 2008; 2012; 2016; 2020; 2024; 2028

Other related appearances
- 1906 Intercalated Games

Switzerland competed at the 2012 Summer Olympics in London, from 27 July to 12 August 2012. Swiss athletes have competed at every Summer Olympic Games in the modern era, except when they boycotted the 1956 Summer Olympics in Melbourne in protest of the Soviet invasion of Hungary. The Swiss Olympic Association sent a total of 103 athletes to the 2012 Games, 72 men and 31 women, to compete in 18 sports.

Switzerland left London with a total of four Olympic medals (two gold and two silver), their lowest in Summer Olympic history since 1992. This was in stark contrast with the zero medal tally of the neighbouring Austria, a nation of roughly comparable size. Most of these medals were awarded to the athletes in cycling, tennis, equestrian, and triathlon.

Among the nation's medalists were mountain biker Nino Schurter, who won his second Olympic medal after winning the silver in men's cross-country race. Equestrian rider Steve Guerdat won Switzerland's first ever gold medal in the individual show jumping. Meanwhile, Nicola Spirig became the second Swiss athlete to claim an Olympic title in women's triathlon since its official debut as a full-medal sport in 2000. World number-one male tennis player Roger Federer won the coveted silver medal in the men's singles, after he was defeated by Great Britain's Andy Murray. Several Swiss athletes missed out of the medal standings. Defending Olympic champion Fabian Cancellara finished seventh in the men's individual time trial, following the collarbone injury he received in the road race.

== Medalists ==
Medal	Name	Sport	Event	Date
Gold	Steve Guerdat	Equestrian	Individual jumping	8 August
Gold	Nicola Spirig	Triathlon	Women's event	4 August
Silver	Roger Federer	Tennis	Men's singles	5 August
Silver	Nino Schurter	Cycling	Men's cross-country	12 August

== Delegation ==
The Swiss Olympic Association selected a team of 103 athletes, 72 men and 31 women, to compete in 18 sports, their largest delegation ever surpassing the record set in Sydney by a single athlete. Men's football was the only team-based sport in which Switzerland were represented in these Olympic Games. There was only a single competitor in badminton, BMX cycling and Greco-Roman wrestling. Athletics was the largest team in the individual sports, with a total of 15 competitors.

The Swiss team featured three defending champions from Beijing: road cyclist Fabian Cancellara, and tennis doubles players Roger Federer and Stanislas Wawrinka. Federer was offered the honour of carrying the Swiss flag for the third time after he won the Wimbledon Championships, and reached the top of the men's world tennis rankings. However, he nominated his compatriot and close friend Wawrinka to perform the duty at the opening ceremony instead. Along with Federer, three other Swiss athletes made their fourth Olympic appearance: marathon runner Viktor Röthlin, Star sailor Flavio Marazzi, and quadruple sculls rower André Vonarburg. Equestrian show jumper Pius Schwizer, at age 49, was the oldest athlete of the team, while all-around gymnast Giulia Steingruber was the youngest at age 18.

Other notable Swiss athletes featured mountain biker and bronze medalist Nino Schurter, freestyle swimmer and six-time national record holder Dominik Meichtry, triathletes Sven Riederer and Nicola Spirig, and equestrian show jumper Steve Guerdat, who led his team by winning the bronze medal in Beijing.

The following is the list of number of competitors participating in the Games. Note that reserves in fencing, field hockey, football, and handball are not counted as athletes:

Sport	Men	Women	Total
Archery	1	1	2
Athletics	4	11	15
Badminton	0	1	1
Canoeing	1	1	2
Cycling	9	2	11
Equestrian	4	0	4
Fencing	2	1	3
Football	18	0	18
Gymnastics	1	1	2
Judo	1	1	2
Rowing	8	0	8
Sailing	5	1	6
Shooting	5	2	7
Swimming	4	3	7
Tennis	2	0	2
Triathlon	2	2	4
Volleyball	4	4	8
Wrestling	1	0	1
Total	72	31	103

== Archery ==
Switzerland qualified two archers in men's and women's individual events.

Athlete	Event	Ranking round		Round of 64	Round of 32	Round of 16	Quarterfinals	Semifinals	Final / BM	
Athlete	Event	Score	Seed	Opposition Score	Opposition Score	Opposition Score	Opposition Score	Opposition Score	Opposition Score	Rank
Axel Müller	Men's individual	633	62	Oh J-h (KOR) (3); L 3–7	Did not advance					
Nathalie Dielen	Women's individual	528	62	Tan Y-t (TPE) (3); L 4–6	Did not advance					

== Athletics ==
14 Swiss athletes qualified for the athletics events.

Key

- Note – Ranks given for track events are within the athlete's heat only
- Q = Qualified for the next round
- q = Qualified for the next round as a fastest loser or, in field events, by position without achieving the qualifying target
- NR = National record
- PB = Personal best
- N/A = Round not applicable for the event
- Bye = Athlete not required to compete in round

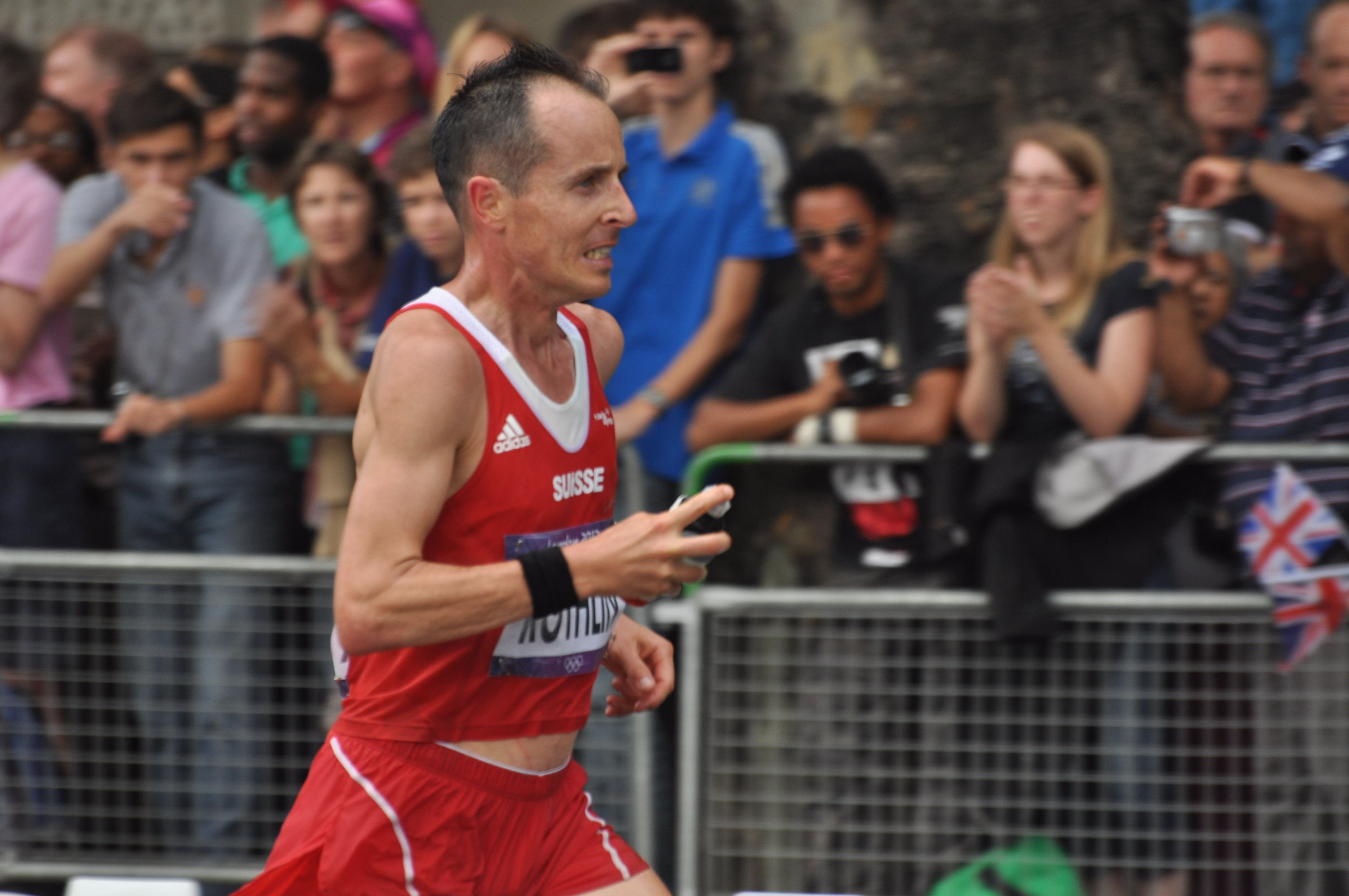
Viktor Röthlin finished eleventh in men's marathon.

Men
Track & road events

Athlete	Event	Heat		Semifinal		Final	
Athlete	Event	Result	Rank	Result	Rank	Result	Rank
Kariem Hussein	400 m hurdles	DNS		Did not advance			
Viktor Röthlin	Marathon	—N/a				2:12:48	11
Reto Schenkel	200 m	20.98	7	Did not advance			
Alex Wilson	200 m	20.57	4 q	20.85	7	Did not advance	

Women
Track & road events

Athlete	Event	Heat		Semifinal		Final	
Athlete	Event	Result	Rank	Result	Rank	Result	Rank
Maja Neuenschwander	Marathon	—N/a				2:34:50	53
Léa Sprunger	200 m	23.27	4	Did not advance			
Noemi Zbären	100 m hurdles	13.33	6	Did not advance			
Michelle Cueni; Mujinga Kambundji; Ellen Sprunger; Léa Sprunger	4 × 100 m relay	43.54 PB	7	—N/a		Did not advance	

*4 × 100 m relay reserves: Jacqueline Gasser and Clélia Reuse

Field events

Athlete	Event	Qualification		Final	
Athlete	Event	Distance	Position	Distance	Position
Nicole Büchler	Pole vault	4.25	25	Did not advance	
Irene Pusterla	Long jump	6.20	25	Did not advance	

Combined events – Heptathlon

Athlete	Event	100H	HJ	SP	200 m	LJ	JT	800 m	Final	Rank
Ellen Sprunger	Result	13.35	1.71	12.62	23.59	5.88	45.63	2:17.54	6107	19
Ellen Sprunger	Points	1072	867	702	1020	813	776	857	6107	19

== Badminton ==
On 11 May 2012, Sabrina Jaquet qualified to compete in the Olympic Badminton Women's singles.

Athlete	Event	Group Stage			Elimination	Quarterfinal	Semifinal	Final / BM	
Athlete	Event	Opposition Score	Opposition Score	Rank	Opposition Score	Opposition Score	Opposition Score	Opposition Score	Rank
Sabrina Jaquet	Women's singles	Nehwal (IND); L (9–21, 4–21)	L Tan (BEL); L (16–21, 16–21)	3	Did not advance				

== Canoeing ==
=== Slalom ===
Switzerland has so far qualified boats for the following events:

Athlete	Event	Preliminary						Semifinal		Final	
Athlete	Event	Run 1	Rank	Run 2	Rank	Best	Rank	Time	Rank	Time	Rank
Michael Kurt	Men's K-1	88.14	3	88.48	5	88.14	6 Q	147.35	13	Did not advance	
Elise Chabbey	Women's K-1	162.92	17	126.46	18	126.46	20	Did not advance – Report			

== Cycling ==
=== Road ===
Fabian Cancellara was the defending Olympic champion in the men's time trial event and the 2008 Olympic silver medallist in the road race event. In the road race on 28 July, he fell and bruised his collarbone when he hit the safety bars with 15 kilometres to go. He finished in 106th place. Because of his pain, he changed his positioning on the bike and was able to take part in the time-trial event, but was unable to retain his title and finished in seventh place.

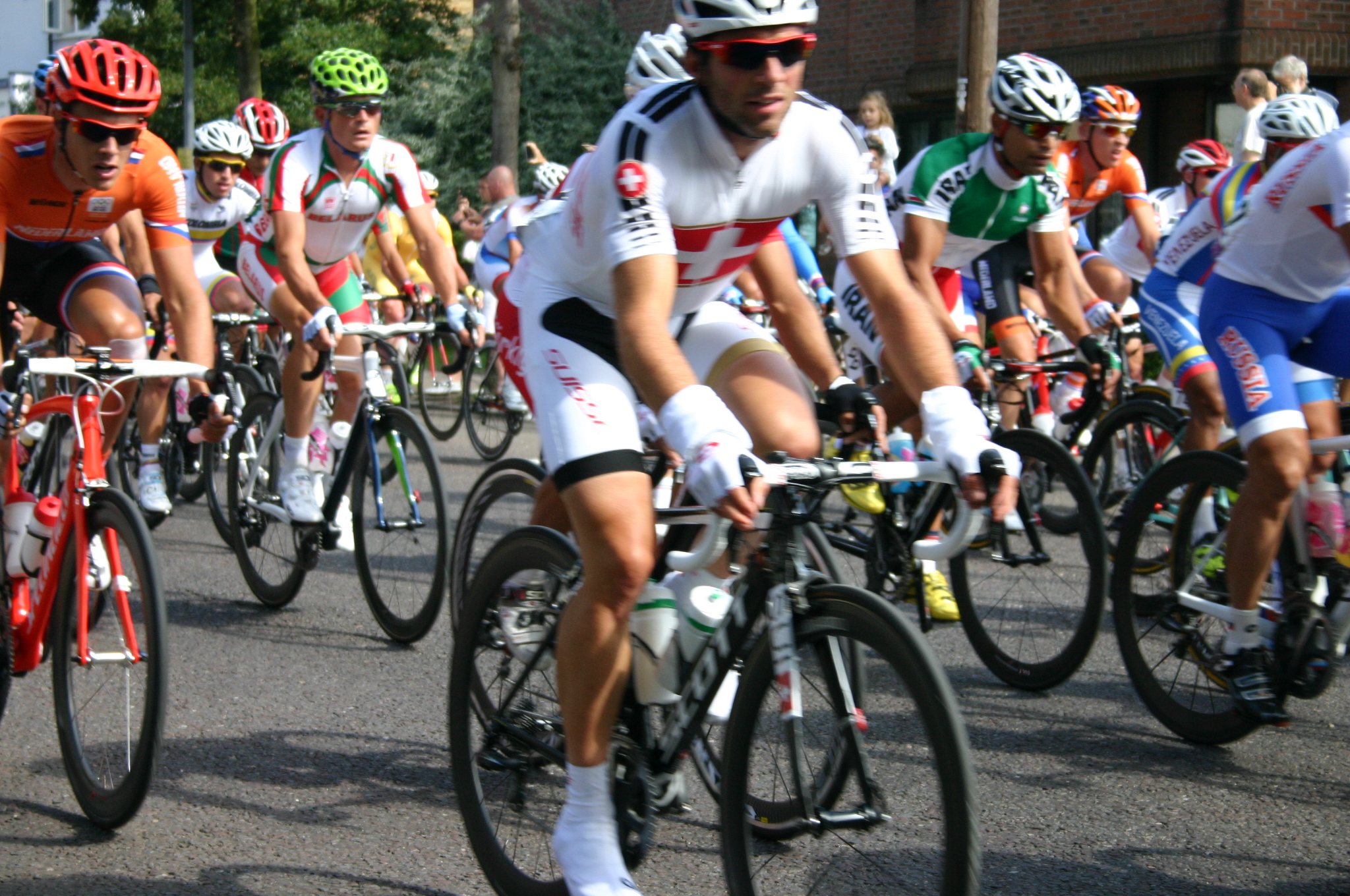
A Swiss rider in the men's road race

Athlete	Event	Time	Rank
Michael Albasini	Men's road race	5:46:47	96
Michael Albasini	Men's time trial	56:38.38	30
Fabian Cancellara	Men's road race	5:51:40	106
Fabian Cancellara	Men's time trial	52:53.71	7
Martin Elmiger	Men's road race	5:46:37	37
Grégory Rast	Men's road race	5:46:05	8
Michael Schär	Men's road race	5:46:37	87

=== Mountain biking ===
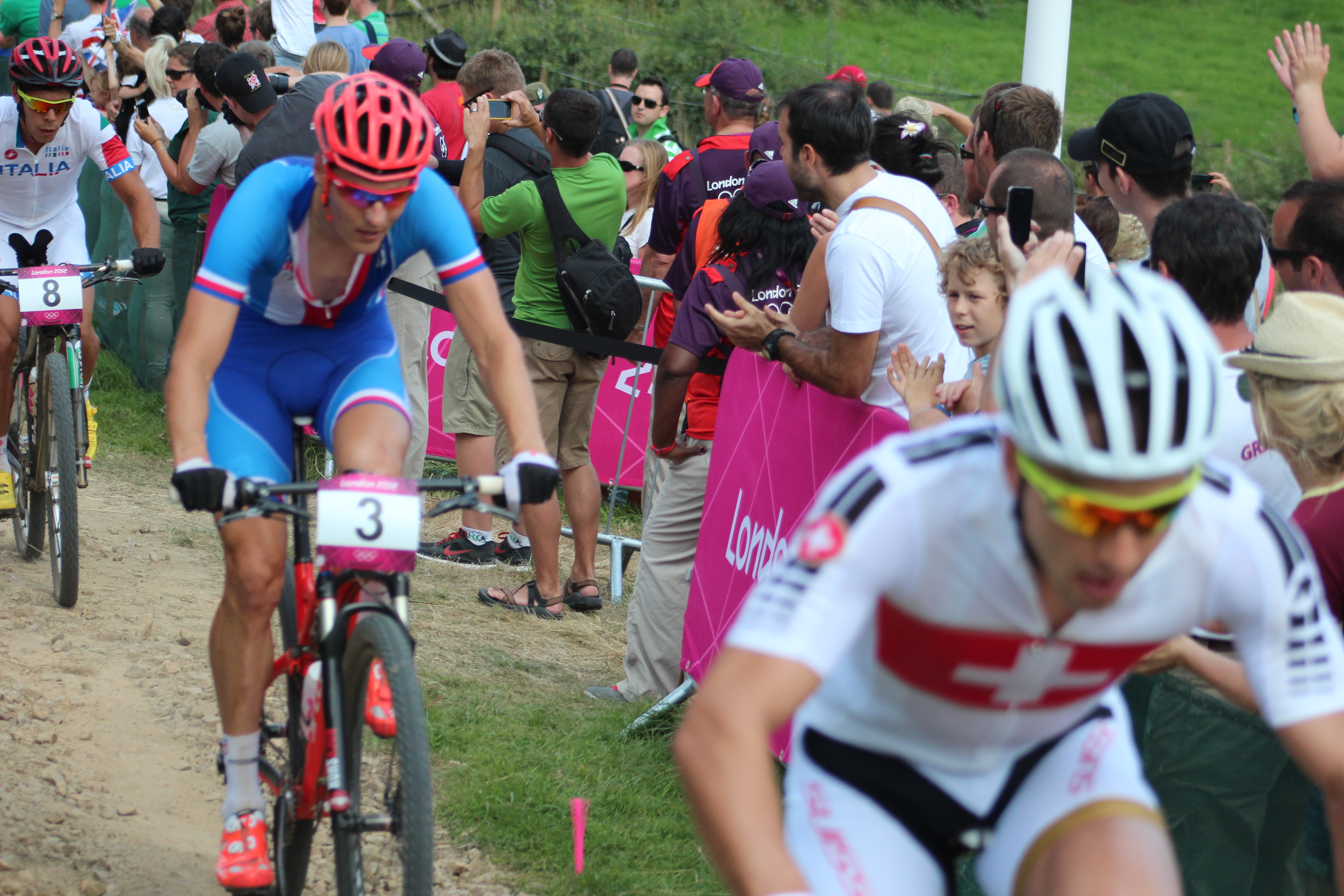
Swiss Nino Schurter and Czech Jaroslav Kulhavý making pace atop men's cross country race

In September 2011, Nino Schurter qualified for the Olympic Mountain Bike event. Ralf Näf and Florian Vogel were qualified on 25 May 2012. Fabian Giger was also named first reserve in case of a withdrawal. On 25 May 2012 Katrin Leumann and Esther Süss qualified for the Olympic Mountain Bike event.

Athlete	Event	Time	Rank
Ralf Näf	Men's cross-country	1:32:58	18
Nino Schurter	Men's cross-country	1:29:08	2nd place, silver medalist(s)
Florian Vogel	Men's cross-country	1:34:36	25
Katrin Leumann	Women's cross-country	1:38:23	19
Esther Süss	Women's cross-country	1:32:46	5

=== BMX ===
Athlete	Event	Seeding		Quarterfinal		Semifinal		Final	
Athlete	Event	Result	Rank	Points	Rank	Points	Rank	Result	Rank
Roger Rinderknecht	Men's BMX	39.618	23	18	4 q	19	7	Did not advance	

== Equestrian ==
=== Jumping ===
Switzerland has qualified a team in the jumping event because they were one of the three best non-qualified teams in the team event of the 2011 European Show Jumping Championship.

Athlete	Horse	Event	Qualification								Final					Total	
Athlete	Horse	Event	Round 1		Round 2			Round 3			Round A		Round B			Total	
Athlete	Horse	Event	Penalties	Rank	Penalties	Total	Rank	Penalties	Total	Rank	Penalties	Rank	Penalties	Total	Rank	Penalties	Rank
Paul Estermann	Castlefield Eclipse	Individual	0	=1 Q	0	0	=1 Q	8	8	=11 Q	5	=20 Q	5	10	=17	10	=17
Steve Guerdat	Nino des Buissonnets	Individual	0	=1 Q	4	4	=17 Q	4	8	=11 Q	0	=1 Q	0	0	=1	0	1st place, gold medalist(s)
Werner Muff	Kiamon	Individual	0	=1 Q	4 #	4	=17 Q	8 #	12	33*	Did not advance					12	33
Pius Schwizer	Carlina	Individual	8	=60 Q	0	8	=31 Q	0	8	=11 Q	1	=7 Q	8	9	=12	9	=12
Paul Estermann; Steve Guerdat; Werner Muff; Pius Schwizer	See above	Team	—N/a								4	=2	12	16	4	16	4

* A maximum of three riders from a single country can advance to the individual final. Therefore, Werner Muff did not advance, as Switzerland had three riders with fewer penalty points.

== Fencing ==
On 11 May 2012, Fabian Kauter and Max Heinzer qualified for the men's individual épée and Tiffany Geroudet (18) qualified for the women's individual épée. Both Fabian Kauter and Max Heinzer lost in the round of 16 to Yannick Borel (21) and Rubén Limardo (13), respectively. Tiffany Geroudet lost in the round of 16 to the eventual 2012 bronze medallist Sun Yujie (1).

Men

Athlete	Event	Round of 32	Round of 16	Quarterfinal	Semifinal	Final / BM	
Athlete	Event	Opposition Score	Opposition Score	Opposition Score	Opposition Score	Opposition Score	Rank
Max Heinzer	Individual épée	Inostroza (CHI); W 15–2	Limardo (VEN); L 11–15	Did not advance			
Fabian Kauter	Individual épée	Bye	Borel (FRA); L 11–15	Did not advance			

Women

Athlete	Event	Round of 64	Round of 32	Round of 16	Quarterfinal	Semifinal	Final / BM	
Athlete	Event	Opposition Score	Opposition Score	Opposition Score	Opposition Score	Opposition Score	Opposition Score	Rank
Tiffany Geroudet	Individual épée	Bye	Piekarska (POL); W 15–14	Sun Yj (CHN); L 10–15	Did not advance			

== Football ==
Switzerland men's football team qualified for the event by reaching the final of the 2011 UEFA European Under-21 Football Championship.

- Men's team event – 1 team of 18 players

=== Men's tournament ===
Squad

The following is the Switzerland squad in the men's football tournament of the 2012 Summer Olympics.

Coach: Pierluigi Tami

No.	Pos.	Player	Date of birth (age)	Caps	Goals	2012 club
1	GK	Diego Benaglio* (c)	8 September 1983 (aged 28)	1	0	(German Football Association) VfL Wolfsburg
2	MF	Xavier Hochstrasser*	1 July 1988 (aged 24)	1	0	(Swiss Football Association) Luzern
3	DF	Fabio Daprelà	19 February 1991 (aged 21)	1	0	(Italian Football Federation) Brescia
4	MF	Oliver Buff	3 August 1992 (aged 19)	0	0	(Swiss Football Association) Zürich
5	DF	François Affolter	13 March 1991 (aged 21)	1	0	(German Football Association) Werder Bremen
6	MF	Alain Wiss	21 August 1990 (aged 21)	1	0	(Swiss Football Association) Luzern
7	FW	Innocent Emeghara	27 May 1989 (aged 23)	1	0	(French Football Federation) Lorient
8	DF	Amir Abrashi	27 March 1990 (aged 22)	1	0	(Swiss Football Association) Grasshopper
9	DF	Fabian Frei	8 January 1989 (aged 23)	1	0	(Swiss Football Association) Basel
10	MF	Pajtim Kasami	2 June 1992 (aged 20)	1	0	(The Football Association) Fulham
11	FW	Admir Mehmedi	16 March 1991 (aged 21)	1	0	(Ukrainian Association of Football) Dynamo Kyiv
12	FW	Josip Drmić	8 August 1992 (aged 19)	1	0	(Swiss Football Association) Zürich
13	DF	Ricardo Rodriguez	25 August 1992 (aged 19)	1	0	(German Football Association) VfL Wolfsburg
14	FW	Steven Zuber	17 August 1991 (aged 20)	1	0	(Swiss Football Association) Grasshopper
15	DF	Timm Klose*	9 May 1988 (aged 24)	1	0	(German Football Association) 1. FC Nürnberg
16	DF	Fabian Schär	20 December 1991 (aged 20)	1	0	(Swiss Football Association) Basel
17	DF	Michel Morganella	17 May 1989 (aged 23)	1	0	(Italian Football Federation) Palermo
18	GK	Benjamin Siegrist	31 January 1992 (aged 20)	0	0	(The Football Association) Aston Villa

* Over-aged player.

Group play

Pos	Team	Pld	W	D	L	GF	GA	GD	Pts	Qualification
1	Mexico	3	2	1	0	3	0	+3	7	Advance to knockout stage
2	South Korea	3	1	2	0	2	1	+1	5	Advance to knockout stage
3	Gabon	3	0	2	1	1	3	−2	2	
4	Switzerland	3	0	1	2	2	4	−2	1	

Source: FIFA
Rules for classification: Group stage tiebreakers
26 July 2012
17:15

Gabon	1–1	Switzerland
Aubameyang 45'	Report	Mehmedi 5' (pen.)

St James' Park, Newcastle
Attendance: 15,748
Referee: Wilmar Roldán (Colombia)

29 July 2012
17:15

South Korea	2–1	Switzerland
Park Chu-young 57'; Kim Bo-kyung 64'	Report	Emeghara 60'

Ricoh Arena, Coventry
Attendance: 30,114
Referee: Raúl Orosco (Bolivia)

1 August 2012
17:00

Mexico	1–0	Switzerland
Peralta 69'	Report

Millennium Stadium, Cardiff
Attendance: 50,000
Referee: Ravshan Irmatov (Uzbekistan)

== Gymnastics ==
=== Artistic ===
Men

Athlete	Event	Qualification								Final							
Athlete	Event	Apparatus						Total	Rank	Apparatus						Total	Rank
Athlete	Event	F	PH	R	V	PB	HB	Total	Rank	F	PH	R	V	PB	HB	Total	Rank
Claudio Capelli	All-around	14.766	14.133	14.133	15.200	14.600	14.766	87.598	19 Q	14.866	14.366	14.166	14.566	14.850	14.500	87.314	17

Women

Athlete	Event	Qualification						Final					
Athlete	Event	Apparatus				Total	Rank	Apparatus				Total	Rank
Athlete	Event	F	V	UB	BB	Total	Rank	F	V	UB	BB	Total	Rank
Giulia Steingruber	All-around	12.900	14.783	13.266	13.766	54.715	23 Q	15.116	13.600	14.166	13.266	56.148	14

== Judo ==
Switzerland has qualified 2 judokas.

Athlete	Event	Round of 64	Round of 32	Round of 16	Quarterfinals	Semifinals	Repechage	Final / BM	
Athlete	Event	Opposition Result	Opposition Result	Opposition Result	Opposition Result	Opposition Result	Opposition Result	Opposition Result	Rank
Ludovic Chammartin	Men's −60 kg	Bye	Choi G-H (KOR); L 0000–0001	Did not advance					
Juliane Robra	Women's −70 kg	—N/a	Hwang Y-S (KOR); L 0002–0011	Did not advance					

== Rowing ==
On 11 May 2012, Augustin Maillefer, Nico Stahlberg, Florian Stofer and André Vonarburg qualified for the Olympic Rowing quadruple sculls and Mario Gyr, Simon Niepmann, Simon Schürch and Lucas Tramèr qualified for the Olympic Rowing lightweight four.

Men

Athlete	Event	Heats		Repechage		Semifinals		Finals	
Athlete	Event	Time	Rank	Time	Rank	Time	Rank	Time	Rank
Augustin Maillefer; Nico Stahlberg; Florian Stofer; André Vonarburg	Quadruple sculls	5:45.13	4 R	5:44.90	3 SA/B	6:19.64	6 FB	6:04.37	12
Mario Gyr; Simon Niepmann; Simon Schürch; Lucas Tramèr	Lightweight four	5:53.56	1 SA/B	Bye		6:00.97	2 FA	6:09.30	5

Qualification Legend: FA=Final A (medal); FB=Final B (non-medal); FC=Final C (non-medal); FD=Final D (non-medal); FE=Final E (non-medal); FF=Final F (non-medal); SA/B=Semifinals A/B; SC/D=Semifinals C/D; SE/F=Semifinals E/F; QF=Quarterfinals; R=Repechage

== Sailing ==
On 5 June 2012, Yannick Brauchli, Romuald Hausser, Flavio Marazzi, Enrico De Maria and Richard Stauffacher qualified to compete in the Olympic Sailing Men's events and Nathalie Brugger qualified to compete in the Olympic Sailing Women's event.

Men

Athlete	Event	Race											Net points	Final rank
Athlete	Event	1	2	3	4	5	6	7	8	9	10	M*	Net points	Final rank
Richard Stauffacher	RS:X	10	~~21~~	14	15	6	18	20	8	10	12	14	127	10
Yannick Brauchli; Romuald Hausser	470	11	16	18	22	14	12	12	7	~~23~~	7	EL	119	16
Flavio Marazzi; Enrico De Maria	Star	13	8	11	9	15	7	10	13	15	~~16~~	EL	102	13

Women

Athlete	Event	Race											Net points	Final rank
Athlete	Event	1	2	3	4	5	6	7	8	9	10	M*	Net points	Final rank
Nathalie Brugger	Laser Radial	13	25	18	14	15	10	~~BFD~~	14	10	16	EL	135	14

M = Medal races; BFD = Black flag disqualification; EL = Eliminated – did not advance into the medal race;

== Shooting ==
Switzerland has earned seven quota places.

Men

Athlete	Event	Qualification		Final	
Athlete	Event	Points	Rank	Points	Rank
Simon Beyeler	50 m rifle 3 positions	1164	19	Did not advance	
Simon Beyeler	10 m air rifle	588	39	Did not advance	
Marcel Bürge	50 m rifle 3 positions	1168	11	Did not advance	
Marcel Bürge	50 m rifle prone	594	14	Did not advance	
Pascal Loretan	50 m rifle prone	591	31	Did not advance	
Pascal Loretan	10 m air rifle	589	37	Did not advance	
Fabio Ramella	Skeet	109	34	Did not advance	
Patrick Scheuber	10 m air pistol	569	32	Did not advance	

Women

Athlete	Event	Qualification		Final	
Athlete	Event	Points	Rank	Points	Rank
Heidi Diethelm	25 m pistol	575	29	Did not advance	
Heidi Diethelm	10 m air pistol	375	35	Did not advance	
Annik Marguet	50 m rifle 3 positions	570	40	Did not advance	
Annik Marguet	10 m air rifle	392	38	Did not advance	

== Swimming ==
Swiss swimmers have so far achieved qualifying standards in the following events (up to a maximum of two swimmers in each event at the Olympic Qualifying Time (OQT), and one at the Olympic Selection Time (OST):

Men

Athlete	Event	Heat		Semifinal		Final	
Athlete	Event	Time	Rank	Time	Rank	Time	Rank
David Karasek	200 m individual medley	2:01.35 NR	28	Did not advance			
Yannick Käser	200 m breaststroke	2:13.49	24	Did not advance			
Alexandre Liess	200 m butterfly	2:00.13	33	Did not advance			
Dominik Meichtry	100 m freestyle	49.95	29	Did not advance			
Dominik Meichtry	200 m freestyle	1:47.97	16 Q	1:48.25	15	Did not advance	
Dominik Meichtry	400 m freestyle	3:51.34	19	—N/a		Did not advance	
Dominik Meichtry	100 m butterfly	53.40	32	Did not advance			

Women

Athlete	Event	Heat		Semifinal		Final	
Athlete	Event	Time	Rank	Time	Rank	Time	Rank
Swann Oberson	10 km open water	—N/a				2:01:38.0	19
Martina van Berkel	200 m butterfly	2:12.25	25	Did not advance			
Danielle Villars	200 m freestyle	2:03.55	31	Did not advance			
Danielle Villars	100 m butterfly	59.42 NR	=26	Did not advance			

== Synchronized swimming ==
Switzerland has qualified 2 quota places in synchronized swimming.

Athlete	Event	Technical routine		Free routine (preliminary)			Free routine (final)		
Athlete	Event	Points	Rank	Points	Total (technical + free)	Rank	Points	Total (technical + free)	Rank
Pamela Fischer; Anja Nyffeler	Duet	81.200	20	82.120	163.320	20	Did not advance		

== Tennis ==
Athlete	Event	Round of 64	Round of 32	Round of 16	Quarterfinals	Semifinals	Final / BM	
Athlete	Event	Opposition Score	Opposition Score	Opposition Score	Opposition Score	Opposition Score	Opposition Score	Rank
Roger Federer	Men's singles	Falla (COL); W 6–3, 5–7, 6–3	Benneteau (FRA); W 6–2, 6–2	Istomin (UZB); W 7–5, 6–3	Isner (USA); W 6–4, 7–6^{(7–5)}	del Potro (ARG); W 3–6, 7–6^{(7–5)}, 19–17	A Murray (GBR); L 2–6, 1–6, 4–6	2nd place, silver medalist(s)
Stanislas Wawrinka	Men's singles	A Murray (GBR); L 3–6, 3–6	Did not advance					
Roger Federer; Stanislas Wawrinka	Men's doubles	—N/a	Nishikori / Soeda (JPN); W 6–7^{(5–7)}, 6–4, 6–4	Erlich / Ram (ISR); L 6–1, 6–7^{(5–7)}, 3–6	Did not advance			

== Triathlon ==
Switzerland has qualified four athletes.

Athlete	Event	Swim (1.5 km)	Trans 1	Bike (40 km)	Trans 2	Run (10 km)	Total Time	Rank
Sven Riederer	Men's	17:22	0:39	58:52	0:30	30:23	1:47:46	8
Ruedi Wild	Men's	18:28	0:42	59:17	0:28	32:15	1:51:10	39
Daniela Ryf	Women's	19:49	0:51	1:08:28	0:31	36:58	2:06:37	40
Nicola Spirig	Women's	19:24	0:40	1:05:33	0:30	33:41	1:59:48	1st place, gold medalist(s)

== Volleyball ==
=== Beach ===
Athlete	Event	Preliminary round	Standing	Round of 16	Quarterfinals	Semifinals	Final / BM	
Athlete	Event	Opposition Score	Standing	Opposition Score	Opposition Score	Opposition Score	Opposition Score	Rank
Jefferson Bellaguarda; Patrick Heuscher	Men's	Pool A Lupo – Nicolai (ITA); L 0–2 (19–21, 18–21); Cerutti – Rego (BRA); L 0–2 (18–21, 17–21); Doppler – Horst (AUT); W 2–0 (24–22, 21–12)	2 Q	Nummerdor – Schuil (NED); L 0–2 (20–22, 15–21)	Did not advance			9
Sébastien Chevallier; Sascha Heyer	Men's	Pool C Wu – Xu (CHN); W 2–1 (18–21, 21–16, 15–12); Prokopiev – Semenov (RUS); W 2–1 (28–26, 18–21, 15–13); Brink – Reckermann (GER); L 0–2 (14–21, 16–21)	2 Q	Fijałek – Prudel (POL); L 0–2 (18–21, 17–21)	Did not advance			9
Simone Kuhn; Nadine Zumkehr	Women's	Pool B Arvaniti – Tsiartsiani (GRE); W 2–0 (21–13, 21–19); Xue – Zhang (CHN); L 1–2 (18–21, 21–16, 8–15); Vasina – Vozakova (RUS); L 1–2 (17–21, 21–19, 9–15)	3 Q	Kessy – Ross (USA); L 0–2 (15–21, 19–21)	Did not advance			9

== Wrestling ==
On 11 May 2012, Pascal Strebel qualified to compete in the Olympic Greco-Roman wrestling.

Key

- VT – Victory by Fall.
- PP – Decision by Points – the loser with technical points.
- PO – Decision by Points – the loser without technical points.

Men's Greco-Roman

Athlete	Event	Qualification	Round of 16	Quarterfinal	Semifinal	Repechage 1	Repechage 2	Final / BM	
Athlete	Event	Opposition Result	Opposition Result	Opposition Result	Opposition Result	Opposition Result	Opposition Result	Opposition Result	Rank
Pascal Strebel	−66 kg	Bye	Tskhadaia (GEO); L 0–3 ^{PO}	Did not advance					15
