= Alejandro Madorno =

Argentine equestrian

Personal information
- Born: 12 December 1971 (age 54) Buenos Aires, Argentina

Sport
- Sport: Equestrian

Alejandro Madorno (born 12 December 1971) is an Argentine equestrian. He competed in the individual jumping event at the 2012 Summer Olympics.
