= Rodrigo Díaz (equestrian) =

Colombian equestrian

Personal information
- Nationality: Colombian
- Born: 16 November 1978 (age 47) Bogotá, Colombia

Sport
- Sport: Equestrian

Rodrigo Díaz (born 16 November 1978) is a Colombian equestrian. He competed in the individual jumping event at the 2012 Summer Olympics.
