= Alberto Michán =

Israeli equestrian (born 1978)

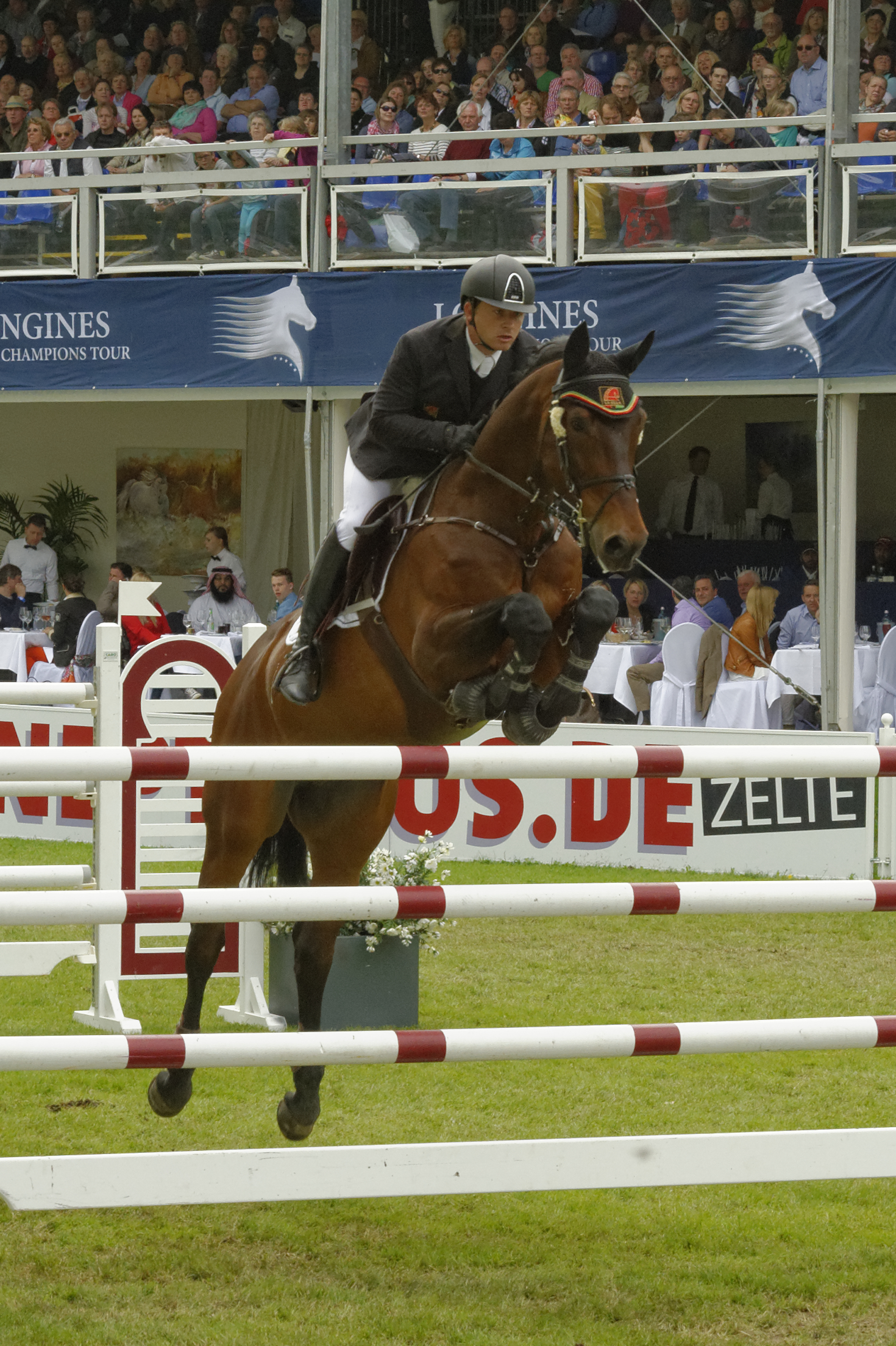
- Michán in 2013

Personal information
- Native name: אלברטו משען
- Nationality: Israel (since 2018); Mexico (until 2017)
- Discipline: Show jumping
- Born: Alberto Michán Halbinger (Note: In this Spanish name, the first or paternal surname is Michán and the second or maternal family name is Halbinger.); 2 December 1978 (age 47); Mexico City, Mexico
- Height: 1.73 m (5 ft 8 in)
- Weight: 70 kg (154 lb)
- Horse(s): Chinobampo Lavita, Rosalía la Silla
Medal record
Equestrian
Representing Mexico
Central American and Caribbean Games
Gold medal – first place	2002 San Salvador	Team Jumping
Silver medal – second place	2002 San Salvador	Jumping Speed

Alberto Michán (Hebrew: אלברטו משען; born 2 December 1978) is an Olympic horse rider. Born in Mexico, he competes for Israel and has represented his country of birth in the past. He qualified to represent Israel at the 2020 Summer Olympics in Tokyo.

== Biography ==
Michan was born in Mexico; his family comes from Israel.

He was a finalist at the FEI World Cup Jumping in 2006 and 2007.

He competed in the 2006 and 2014 World Equestrian Games.

He competed for Mexico at the 2008 Summer Olympics in Beijing, both in individual jumping (coming in 29th) and in team jumping (coming in 8th).

He earned a bronze medal in Team Jumping at the 2011 Pan American Games in Guadalajara, Mexico.

At the 2012 Summer Olympics, he tied with Scott Brash and Nick Skelton, both of the team-gold medal-winning United Kingdom, for 5th in individual jumping. He was part of the Mexican team for team jumping, which finished in fifth place.

He qualified to represent Israel at the 2020 Summer Olympics in Tokyo.
