= Carlos Ribas =

Brazilian equestrian and showjumper

Personal information
- Born: 7 June 1973 (age 52); São Paulo, Brazil

Sport
- Sport: Equestrian

Carlos Ribas (born 7 June 1973) is a Brazilian equestrian and showjumper. He competed in the individual jumping event at the 2012 Summer Olympics.
