= Abdullah bin Mutaib Al Saud =

Saudi royal and equestrian (born 1984)

- Born: 13 October 1984 (age 41); London
Names
- Abdullah bin Mutaib bin Abdullah bin Abdulaziz Al Saud
- House: House of Saud
- Father: Mutaib bin Abdullah
- Mother: Jawahir bint Abdallah bint Abdul Rahman Al Saud
- Sports career
- Country: Saudi Arabia
- Sport: Equestrian
Medal record
Olympic Games
Bronze medal – third place	2012 London	Team jumping

Abdullah bin Mutaib Al Saud (Arabic: عبد الله بن متعب بن عبد الله آل سعود; born 13 October 1984) is a Saudi Arabian show jumping rider and member of House of Saud.

== Early life and education ==
Prince Abdullah was born in London on 13 October 1984. He is the son of Mutaib bin Abdullah, the minister of national guard. His mother is Jawahir, a daughter of Abdallah bin Abdul Rahman Al Saud. Prince Abdullah holds a law degree from King Saud University.

== Sports career ==
Prince Abdullah participated in various show jumping events. He competed at the 2008 Summer Olympic in Beijing and also participated in 2012 London Olympics. Saudi Arabia's equestrian show jumping team, including Prince Abdullah, won a bronze medal in the 2012 Summer Olympics. Prince Abdullah finished the rounds with a score of 13 faults.
