= Oleksandr Onyshchenko =

Ukrainian politician

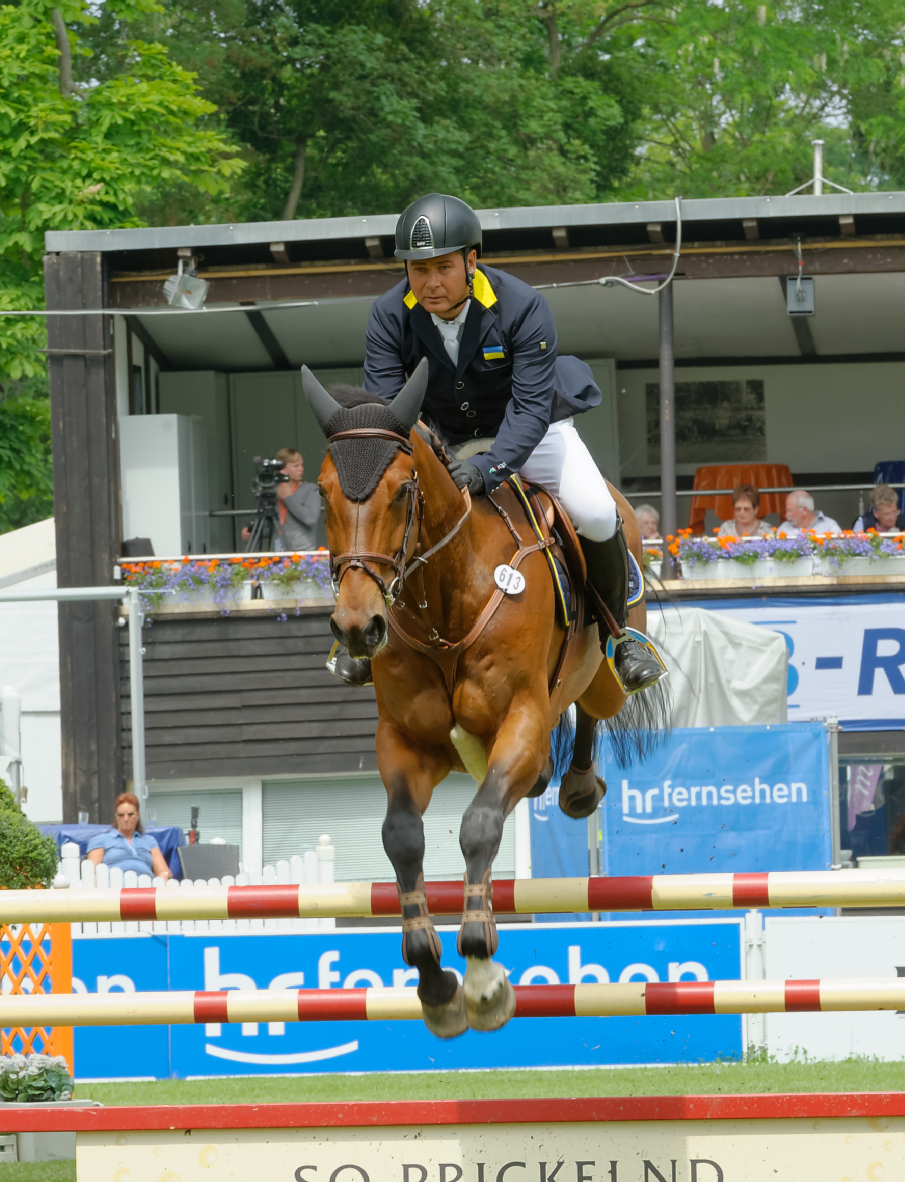
- Oleksandr Onyshchenko in 2015
- Born: March 31, 1969 (age 57); Matveev-Kurgan, Rostov Oblast, Russian SFSR, Soviet Union
- Occupations: Politician, show jumper
- Height: 1.80 m (5 ft 11 in)
- Political party: Socialist Party of Ukraine
- Children: daughter (born in 1994), son (born in 2002), son (born in 2017), daughter (born in 2021 in Ankum, Germany)

Oleksandr Romanovych Onyshchenko (Ukrainian: Олександр Романович Онищенко, born March 31, 1969) is a Ukrainian ex-politician, show jumping rider and patron. Onyshchenko was previously a member of the Ukrainian Parliament and a member of pro-Russian Ukrainian president Viktor Yanukovych’s Party of Regions. In the summer of 2016, while a member of Parliament, Onyshchenko fled Ukraine after he was stripped of immunity by the Parliament of Ukraine and the General Prosecutor Office expressed intention to arrest him due to charges related to alleged corruption and money laundering. In May 2020 Prosecutor's office of Ukraine extradition request was denied by the German court. Since 2016, he has resided in European Union. As of 2019, Onyshchenko was reportedly residing in Spain.

In January 2021, under new administration in the White House Onishchenko, was sanctioned in the United States in connection with his support of Donald Trump during the presidential elections.

== Early life ==
Oleksandr Onyshchenko was born on March 31, 1969. Some Ukrainian media claim that previously Onyshchenko carried a different family name - Oleksandr Radzhabovych Kadyrov.

He was educated at the Kharkiv Military College of the Rear of the Soviet Ministry of Interior (today the National Academy of the National Guard of Ukraine) and graduated from the National Transport University.

His father was Rajab Kadyrov was a high-ranking official of the Ministry of Internal Affairs of the USSR, and later was the Deputy Minister of Internal Affairs of Uzbekistan.

== Business career ==
Onyshchenko started his career in 1990, where he worked in the oil and gas industry. Onyshchenko still owns oil and gas distribution company "GK Gazovy Alyans". Onyshchenko has also been implicated in running a fraud and money laundering scheme that traded approximately US$1.5 billion in illicit assets. Onyshchenko was named as part of the Quickpace deal between Onyshchenko, Pavel Fuchs, and “Prontoservus,” reportedly a front for Serhiy Kurchenko. No investigation ever been launched by the law enforcement agencies following the news publications.

While in exile, Onyshchenko reportedly bought a horse stud farm with intentions to host invitational equestrian tournaments. However, Onyshchenko failed to receive the necessary visa and work permits required to operate such a tournament within Germany. As of 2022 all immigration formalities were cleared in Germany.

== Political career ==
In 2007, Onyshchenko was appointed as an assistant Minister for Emergencies and affairs in protection of population from the consequences of the Chernobyl Catastrophe (today State Emergency Service of Ukraine). He was first elected as a member of the Ukrainian parliament (Verkhovna Rada) in the 2012 Ukrainian parliamentary election. In 2012 he was elected to parliament in electoral district 93 (located in Kyiv Oblast) for Party of Regions. In 2014 he was re-elected in the same district as an independent candidate. In parliament he became a member of the parliamentary faction People's Will.

== Exile ==
In 2016, Onyshchenko was accused of corruption by President Petro Poroshenko, whom he accused of corruption. People's Will expelled him in June 2017. His parliamentary immunity was stripped in July 2016.

In Ukraine the National Anti-Corruption Bureau of Ukraine has charged Onyschenko as the founder and head of a criminal organization, allegedly whose members in the period from January 2014 to June 2016 stole funds during the production and sale of natural gas under joint venture agreements with UkrGasVydobuvannya.

Onyshchenko initially fled to the United Kingdom, then to Germany, and finally Spain, where he reportedly currently resides. In May 2020, Germany refused extradition of Onyshchenko. A court ruling stated it was "likely" that his extradition "would not meet minimum standards of international law on conditions of detention", including the European Convention on Human Rights.

On 11 January 2021, Onyshchenko was put on the US Sanctioned Persons list due to attempt to influence U.S. Presidential elections.

== Show jumping and philanthropy ==
Onyshchenko became a professional show jumping rider in 2000, when he acquired a stud farm in Belgium. He subsequently purchased another stud farm in Germany. He was the president of the Equestrian Federation of Ukraine from 2002 to 2013. In 2008, he as the president of the Equestrian Federation presented the national team of Ukraine for the first time in the Olympics and competed at the 2008 Summer Olympics (jumping event), the 2012 Summer Olympics (jumping event), and the 2014 Show Jumping World Championships.

In 2013, Onyshchenko bought FC Arsenal Kyiv which at the end of the same year was announced as bankrupt and was withdrawn from the football competitions (see 2013-14 Ukrainian Premier League).

Onyshchenko is the founder and director of "Top Ukraine", a charity to promote "sport, fashion, art and culture in Ukraine". The Top Ukraine organizes such events as Miss Ukraine and Miss Ukraine Universe.

== Personal life ==
Onyshchenko has two children. Onyshchenko was married to Miss Ukraine 1997 Kseniya Kuzmenko until mid 2009, living mostly in Belgium, and has a child Олександр Olexandr or Sasha (b. 2002) with her. (According to Ukrainian media) in 2009, he was engaged to Ukrainian model Snejana Onopka, but the couple did not marry. Onyshchenko was dating Ganna Rizatdinova, an Olympic award-winning Ukrainian rhythmic gymnast, who is 24 years younger than him. In 2017 their son Roman was born. In 2018, Onyshchenko and Rizatdinova separated.

In August 2016, Onyshchenko moved to London, UK because he feared for his life claiming "president (Petro Poroshenko) organises everything to kill me." He later moved to Spain.

In the Russian register of companies Onyshchenko appears in a February 2021 registration documents as a citizen of Russia.

In May 2022, Onyshchenko was granted Macedonian citizenship. The government of North Macedonia decided to revoke this decision (to grant citizenship to Onishchenko) early December 2022.

Sporting positions
Preceded by Vadim Rabinovich	President of FC Arsenal Kyiv; 2013–2013	Succeeded by club went bankrupt
Preceded by I.Musiyenko	President of the Equestrian Federation of Ukraine; 2002–2013	Succeeded by Yuriy Chertkov
