= Werner Muff =

Swiss equestrian

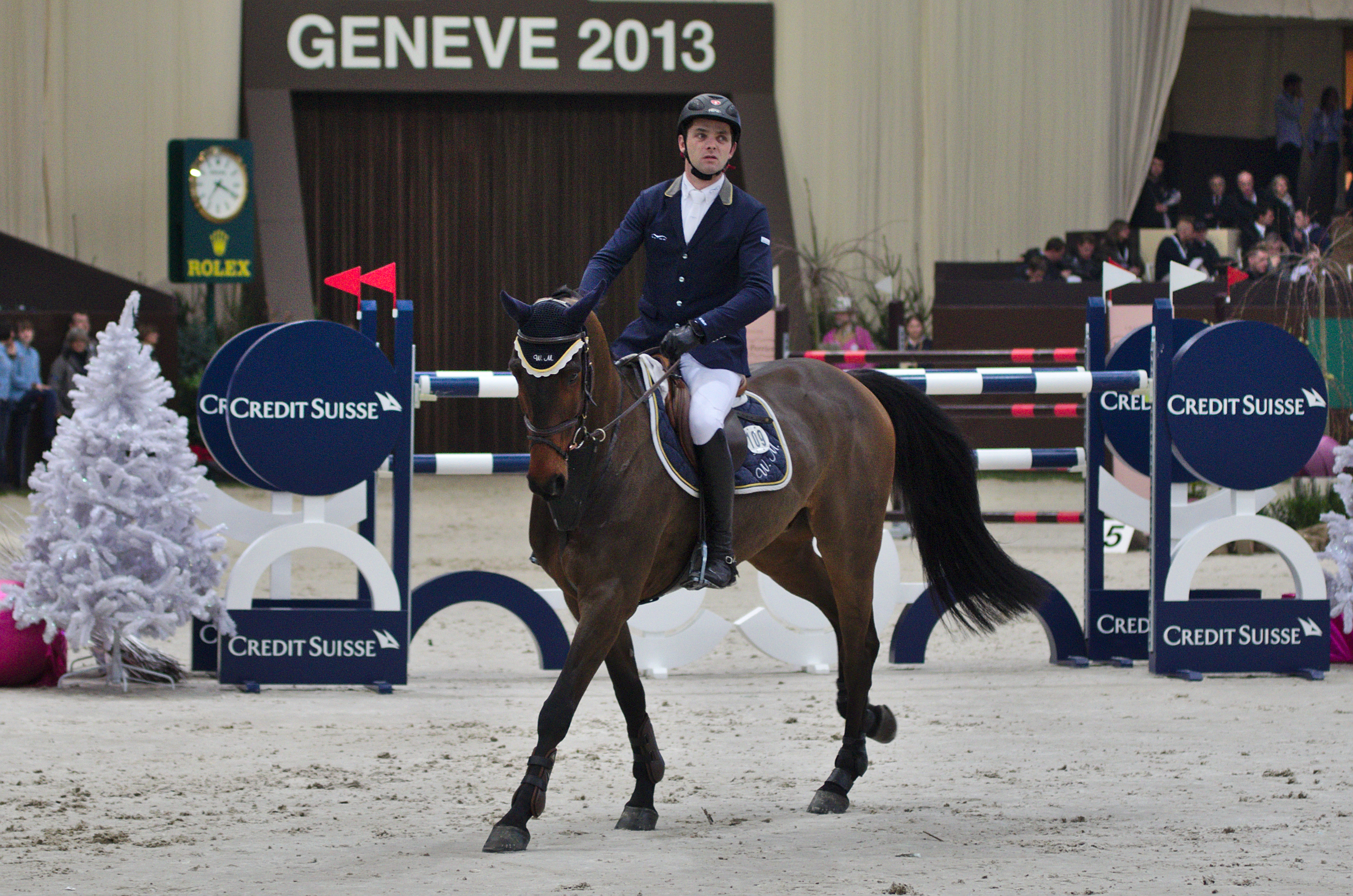
- CHI Genève 2013, Werner Muff and Never Last

Personal information
- Nationality: Switzerland
- Discipline: Show jumping
- Born: 25 February 1974 (age 52); Sursee
- Height: 6 ft 0 in (1.83 m)
- Weight: 167 lb (76 kg; 11 st 13 lb)
- Horse(s): Bas II, Brave Heart II, Cadonna, Champ V, Donna XIX, Etolin van het Kapelhof, Landthago, Ludwig III, Never Last, Osiris du Goyen, Pollendr, Zwinulana

Werner Muff (born 25 February 1974) is a Swiss equestrian. His discipline is show jumping, either individually or as part of a team. He currently ranks 131st on the FEI Rolex Ranking List.

== Biography ==
Muff first began riding on his father's cavalry horse and became interested in show jumping at an early age. Per his parents' request, he attended school at Raiffeisen Bank in Beromünster between 1989 and 1992. Starting in 1993, he worked at Alois Fuchs Wängi as a heater for a year and a half. Between 1994 and 1996, his employer was Thomas Fuchs in Bietenholz, and from 1996 to 2000, he worked for Manfred Birchler in Bilten. There he won his first Grand Prix on the horse BB Cardinale and received the opportunity to ride Nation's Prices. After four years of self-employment at Thomas Fuchs's stable, he turned to self-employment in the barn of Susanne Meier. He began winning a variety of different jumping shows, mostly with the horse Plot Blue. Among others, Muff won the Swiss Cup final in 2005, 2006, and 2010. In 2006 he was also awarded "Rookie of the Year". He competed in the 2012 Summer Olympics, earning thirty-third individually and being part of the fourth-place Swiss team. In individual jumping, Muff did not advance due to a rule saying that no more than three riders from a single country could advance to the finals, and Steve Guerdat, Paul Estermann, and Pius Schweizer had already advanced for Switzerland.

== Criticism ==
In 2010, Muff won the equestrian Swiss Cup final in Ascona for the third time. In the final, Muff changed horses from Comanche to Escorial V, the latter a notoriously difficult horse. Pius Schwizer responded in shock, "Escorial was not to lead. Such a block cannot ride him. He was made especially for the 18-year-old Annina Züger at risk of injury." Muff responded, "The success is not really pleasure. Escorial is a sensitive horse with which my competitors had difficulties. This happens with a final stop in changing horses. Maybe some are now injured in her honor. Nothing can deport you on the horse." The next year, the practice of the Cup in a final change of horses, was abolished and replaced by a final two rounds.

== Horses ==
Name	Breed	Color	Gender	Date of birth	Country of origin	Sire	Dam	Damsire	Owner	References
Bas II	Dutch Warmblood	Grey	Gelding	1 May 2006	Netherlands	Cartano	Germa	Boreas	Fredi Mueller	
Brave Heart II	Dutch Warmblood	Chestnut	Gelding	8 June 2006	Netherlands	Utopie	Lomelia H	Emilion	Werner Muff	
Cadonna	Oldenburg horse	Grey	Mare	8 February 2006	Germany	Carinue	La Donna	Landfriese II	Werner Muff	
Champ V	Holsteiner	Brown	Gelding	20 March 2003	Germany	Cash and Carry	Marcella I	Anthony's Dream	Werner Muff	
Donna XIX	Belgian Warmblood	Brown	Mare	10 March 2003	Belgium	Kannan	W'Enola van het Neerveld	Darco	Werner Muff	
Etolin van het Kapelhof	Belgian Warmblood	Brown	Gelding	1 January 2004	Belgian	Diamant de Semilly	Wolke van't Kapelhof	Landetto	Werner Muff	
Landthago	Holsteiner	Grey	Gelding	9 June 2003	Germany	Landjunge	K-Jacarana	Carthago	Werner Muff	
Ludwig III	Oldenburg horse	Brown	Gelding	22 May 2004	Germany	Ludwig von Bayern	Lady	Larinero	Werner Muff	
Never Last	Oldenburg horse	Dark brown	Gelding	16 February 2004	Germany	Napels	Rainy Day	Ramiro	Werner Muff	
Osiris du Goyen	Selle Français	Chestnut	Gelding	17 July 2004	France	Le Tot du Semilly	Urville de Sivry	Nidor Platìere	Marlis Mühlebach	
Pollendr	Rhinelander horse	Dark brown	Gelding	16 February 2005	Germany	Polytraum	Carina	Corrado	Marlis Mühlebach	
Zwinulana	Dutch warmblood	Chestnut	Mare	18 June 2004	Netherlands	Phin Phin	Freesia	Ahorn	Fredi Müller	
