= Ben Maher =

British equestrian (born 1983)

Ben Maher MBE
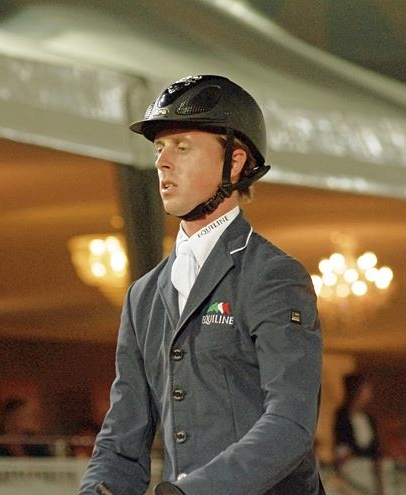
- Maher in 2012

Personal information
- Full name: Benjamin Richard Maher
- Nationality: British
- Discipline: Show jumping
- Born: 30 January 1983 (age 43); Enfield, Greater London, England
- Height: 6 ft 0 in (183 cm)
- Weight: 150 lb (68 kg)
Medal record
Equestrian
Representing Great Britain
Olympic Games
Gold medal – first place	2012 London	Team jumping
Gold medal – first place	2020 Tokyo	Individual jumping
Gold medal – first place	2024 Paris	Team jumping
World Championships
Bronze medal – third place	2026 Aachen	Team jumping
Bronze medal – third place	2022 Herning	Team jumping
European Championships
Gold medal – first place	2013 Herning	Team Jumping
Silver medal – second place	2013 Herning	Individual Jumping
Silver medal – second place	2019 Rotterdam	Individual Jumping
Silver medal – second place	2025 A Coruna	Team Jumping
Bronze medal – third place	2011 Madrid	Team Jumping
Bronze medal – third place	2019 Rotterdam	Team Jumping

Benjamin Richard Maher MBE (born 30 January 1983, in Enfield) is a British show jumper. He represented Britain at the 2008 Beijing Olympics, 2009 European Championships in Windsor, 2012 London Olympics, 2016 Rio Olympics, the 2020 Tokyo Olympics and the 2024 Paris Olympics. He won the team jumping gold at the London Olympics with Team GB, their first team jumping gold medal for 60 years, an individual gold for Great Britain at the 2020 Tokyo Olympics, and team jumping gold again at the 2024 Paris Summer Games. That win tied him with three-day eventer Richard Meade and dressage rider Charlotte Dujardin as the most successful British Olympic equestrians in gold medals won.

He also won bronze at the 2011 Europeans Championships in Madrid, Spain. He has won many international Grand Prix, including the Olympia Grand Prix, the King George V Gold Cup at Hickstead and an FEI World Cup Qualifier Grand Prix at Wellington with various rides.

Maher was selected as part of the 2016 British Olympic Show Jumping Team with Tic Tac.

Maher began riding at the age of eight. He was educated at Saffron Walden County High School, and after finishing school, he trained with Liz Edgar before travelling to Switzerland to further his education with Beat Mandli.

He had success as a young rider, winning Team Gold with the British Young Riders Team at the European Championships in 2004. He is now a regular member for the British team and has been ranked as high as 2nd on the Longines World Rankings.

== International Championship results ==
Results
Year	Event	Horse	Placing	Notes
2004	European Young Rider Championships	Alfredo	1st place, gold medalist(s)	Team
2004	European Young Rider Championships	Alfredo	30th	Individual
2008	Olympic Games	Rolette	5th	Team
2008	Olympic Games	Rolette	19th	Individual
2009	World Cup Final	Robin Hood W	7th	
2009	European Championships	Robin Hood W	6th	Team
2009	European Championships	Robin Hood W	15th	Individual
2011	European Championships	Triple X III	3rd place, bronze medalist(s)	Team
2011	European Championships	Triple X III	12th	Individual
2012	Olympic Games	Triple X III	1st place, gold medalist(s)	Team
2012	Olympic Games	Triple X III	9th	Individual
2013	European Championships	Cella	1st place, gold medalist(s)	Team
2013	European Championships	Cella	2nd place, silver medalist(s)	Individual
2015	European Championships	Diva II	4th	Team
2015	European Championships	Diva II	23rd	Individual
2016	Olympic Games	Tic Tac	12th	Team
2016	Olympic Games	Tic Tac	25th	Individual
2019	European Championships	Explosion W	3rd place, bronze medalist(s)	Team
2019	European Championships	Explosion W	2nd place, silver medalist(s)	Individual
2019	Longines Global Champions Tour	Explosion W		
2021	Olympic Games	Explosion W		Team
2021	Olympic Games	Explosion W	1st place, gold medalist(s)	Individual
EL = Eliminated; RET = Retired; WD = Withdrew

== Career ==
In 2005, CSIO5* Hickstead, Great Britain: Maher won the Hickstead Derby

In 2008, Ben competed at the Olympic Games with Rolette.

In 2010, CSI5*-W s'-Hertogenbosch, The Netherlands: On 26 March, Maher and Wonderboy III took the top spot in the feature class of the opening day. This was the 1.50m Rabobank Prijs.

CSI5*-W London Olympia, Great Britain: Ben and Noctambule Courcelle won the Puissance.

In 2011, CSI5*-W Basel, Switzerland: Oscar took 4th prize in a speed-class.

CSI5*-W Zurich, Switzerland: Maher and Robin Hood W came 2nd in the Rolex FEI World Cup Qualifier.

CSI3* Lummen, Belgium: Tripple X III came 2nd.

CES5* European Championships, Madrid, Spain: The British team of Nick Skelton (Carlo) (1.04/0/0); Guy Williams (Titus) (7.01)/ (12)/0; Ben Maher (Tripple X III) (2.76/4/4); and John Whitaker (Peppermill) (5.66/4/8) took Team Bronze. Ben and Tripple X III also took 12th position individually.

CSI5*-W Olympia Horse Show, London, UK: Ben and his home-bred Tripple X III came 1st in the Rolex FEI World Cup.

In 2012, CSI5*-W Basel, Switzerland: Tripple X III won the feature 1m55 class on Friday night.

Won gold medal at the 2012 London Olympics for Great Britain in the Team showjumping.

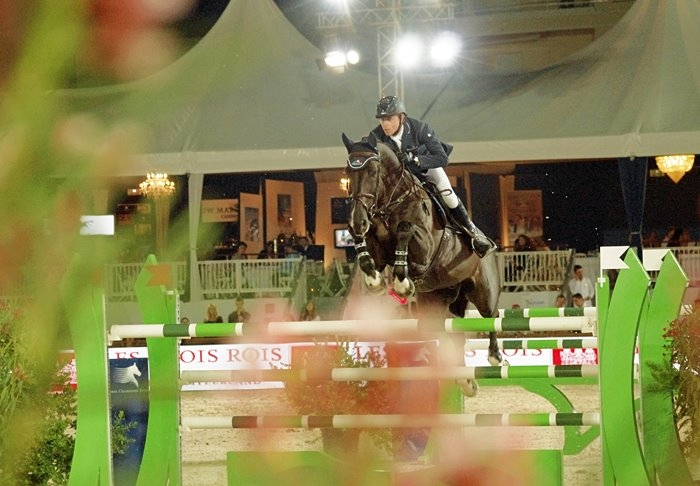
Ben Maher and Tripple X, Global Champions Tour of Cannes (June 2012)

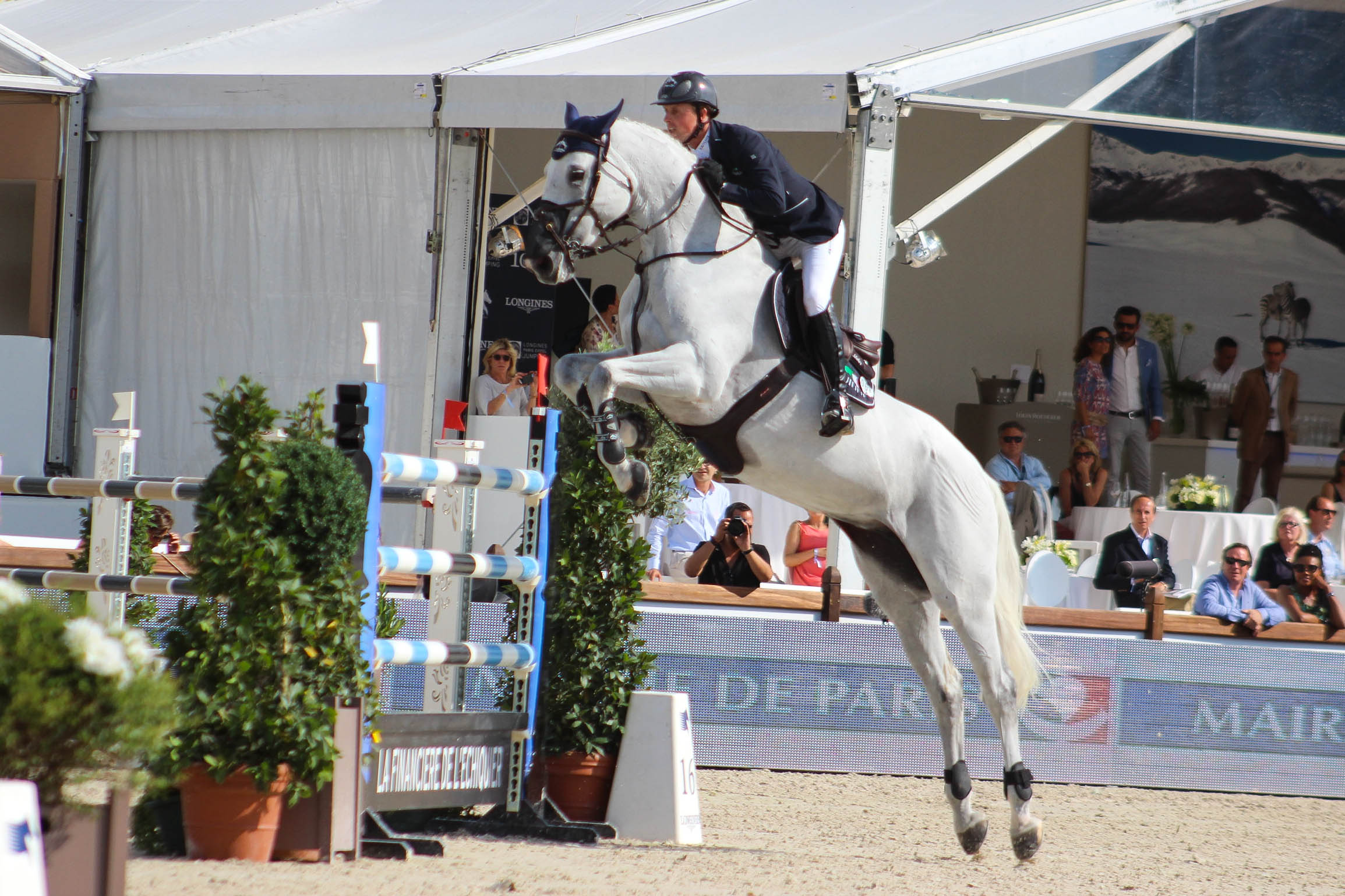
Maher and Cella tie to win the Global Champions Tour Sunday Grand Prix in 2015

Maher was appointed Member of the Order of the British Empire (MBE) in the 2013 New Year Honours for services to equestrianism.

In 2013, won team gold and individual silver medals at the European Championships, riding Cella.

Won Olympia London International Horse Show Grand Prix riding Tripple X.

Won the Longines Global Champions Tour Grand Prix of London at Olympic Park with his grey mare Cella.

In 2014, won the $125,000 Grand Prix CSI3* at WEF with Cella.

Won WEF World Cup Qualifier on Cella

Won the €130,000 Grand Prix in Guangzhou, China with Vainquer

Won the Olympia London International Horse Show Grand Prix on Diva II.

In 2015, won World Cup CSI5* at WEF on Diva II

Won Rotterdam Nations Cup on Diva II, with team members Joe Clee/Utamaro D'Ecaussines, Jessica Mendoza/Spirit T, Michael Whitaker/Cassionato

Tied for first with Karim Elzoghby/Amelia at Global Champions Tour Paris Grand Prix

In 2016, won the $500,000 Rolex CSI5* at WEF with Sarena

Won the Beijing World Cup Qualifier on Wavanta

Won the Rome Nations Cup with Tic Tac and teammates Jessica Mendoza/Spirit T, Michael Whitaker/Cassionato, and John Whitaker/Ornellaia

He won two consecutive Longines Global Champions wins in 2018 and 2019.

Won the Individual Showjumping Gold Medal at Tokyo 2020 Olympics, riding Explosion W.

== Owners ==
Ben Maher has formally ridden horses under several owners, most notably Jane Forbes Clark and Poden Farms, whom he used to also train the owner, Emily Moffitt.

He has been riding for American owners Charlotte Rossetter & Pamela Wright since late 2019. Their partnership began when they purchased shares in his Olympic Gold Medal partner, Explosion w, and Ben since gone on to ride exclusively for them with new horses.

As of October 2026, Maher ranked 7th in the world, according to the FEI Jumping Rankings, having reached a peak of 1st in 2013.

He bases in Wellington, Florida each year from late December until late March, and Europe throughout the summer.

== See also ==
- 2012 Summer Olympics and Paralympics gold post boxes
