= Luciana Diniz =

Portuguese equestrian

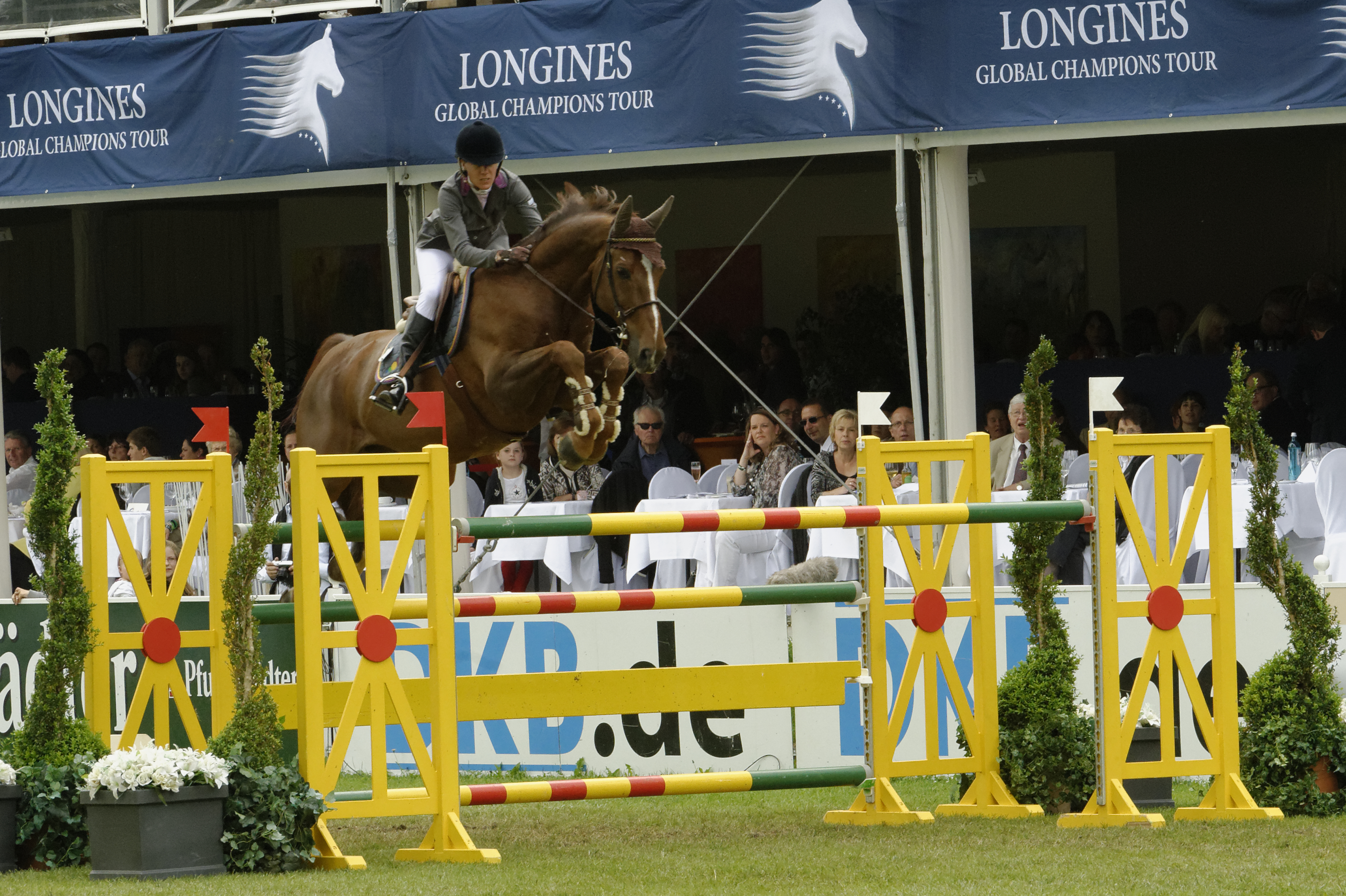
Luciana Diniz with Lacontino Wiesbaden 2013 (CSI 5*)

Luciana Diniz (born 11 October 1970) is a Brazilian-born Portuguese equestrian whose discipline is show jumping. She currently ranks thirteenth on the FEI Rolex Ranking List. In addition to her show jumping work, Diniz is also known for G.R.O.W., an "informal education philosophy" that teaches adults and children. She has also started a documentary series on her horses called the Hoofprint Series.

Luciana went to the 2016 Olympic Summer Games in Rio de Janeiro as an individual competitor for Portugal with Fit For Fun.

== Biography ==
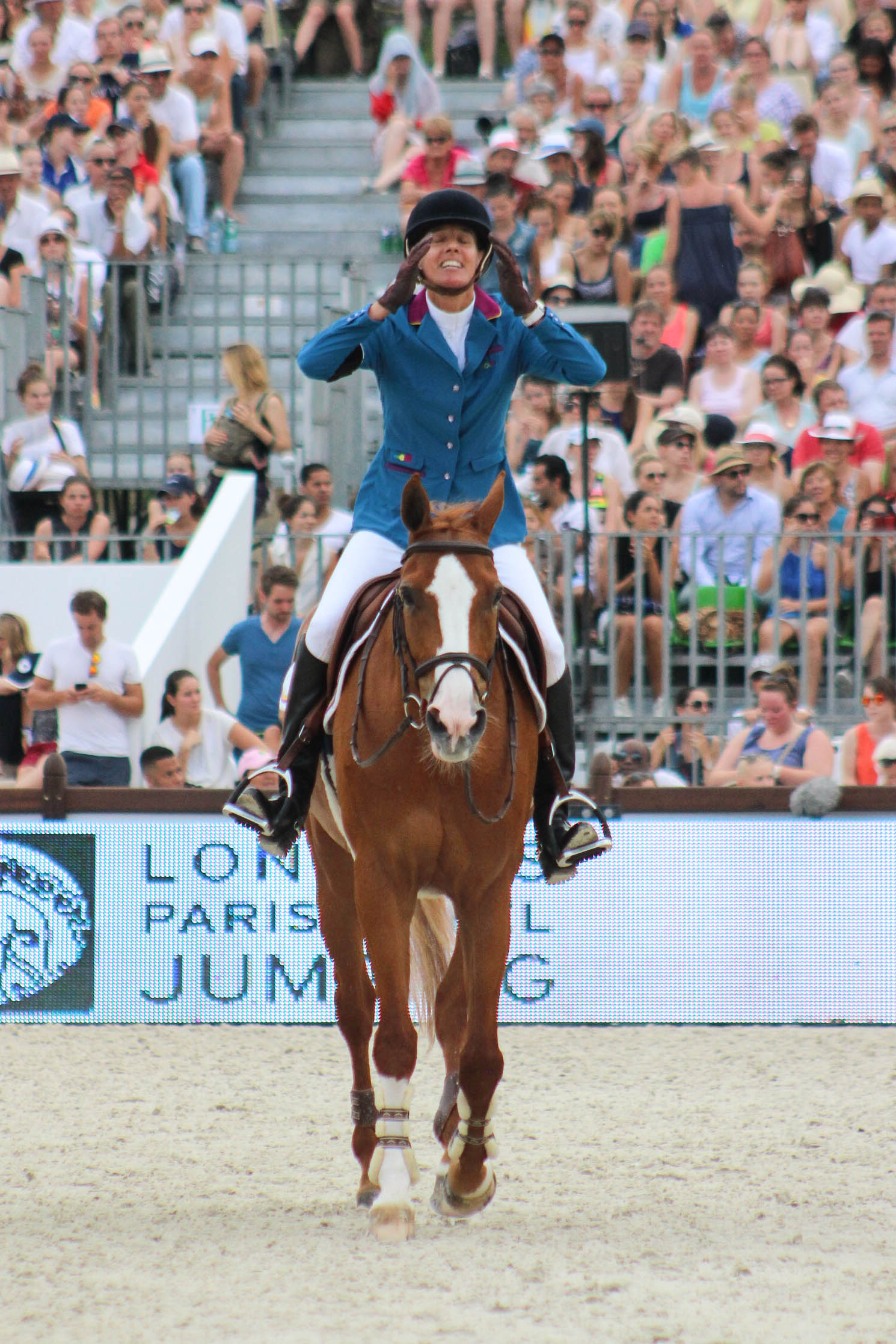
Diniz celebrating a clear round aboard Fit For Fun in the LGCT Grand Prix of Paris

Diniz was born in São Paulo, Brazil. She is the daughter of former Brazilian dressage rider and eight-time champion Lica Diniz and polo player Arnaldo Diniz. Her two brothers, Andre and Fabio, followed their father and are now the top two Brazilian polo players in the world. She has a third brother, Arnaldo, who is an amateur racer and won the Brazilian Amateur Championships in 2014. Originally Diniz began with dressage like her mother and rode the family horse Marko until his death when she was eleven. Luciana quit riding for a month before returning and discovering show jumping. She won the Children's Jumping Championships at the age of twelve and the Junior Jumping Championships at the ages of fourteen and eighteen.

Diniz left home at eighteen and trained at various stables of show jumping champions including Alwin Schockemoele before starting her own business in Fürstenau, Lower Saxony. At the 2012 Summer Olympics, Diniz came in seventh individually. In 2015, she was the overall winner of the Longines Global Champions Tour.

== Personal life ==
Diniz has twin sons, Pedro and Paulo. She currently lives in Sankt Augustin. She is known for her intelligence as well and is fluent in five languages. She has also created an "informal education philosophy" called G.R.O.W., which is supposed to teach people—mostly children—how to become better individuals and improve society. In addition to helping people, G.R.O.W. also trains horses—mostly for show jumping—and sells them to riders that she thinks best suit them.

== Top Horses ==
| Horse | Known As | Year Foaled | Breeding | Gender | Owner | Accomplishments |
|---|---|---|---|---|---|---|
| Winningmood | Winnie | 1999 | Belgian Warmblood | Stallion | Societe Civie de L'Ecurie de Meutry | €300,000 LGCT Grand Prix of Vienna, 2015; LGCT Grand Prix of Madrid, 2015 |
| Lennox | | 2001 | Oldenburg | Gelding | Arnaldo and Luciana Diniz | FEI World Cup Qualifier Leipzig, 2015; CSI5* Basel Grand Prix |
| Fit For Fun | Fitti | 2004 | Hanoverian | Mare | Luciana Diniz and Ralf Jῡnger | €200,000 Longines Grand Prix Port of Rotterdam, 2016; CSI5* Grand Prix Doha, 2016 |

== Sponsors ==
She is sponsored by Bruno Delgrange Sellier, Deserata Show Jackets, and Roeckl Gloves.
