= James Paterson-Robinson =

Australian equestrian (born 1978)

Personal information
- Nationality: Australian
- Born: 29 September 1978 (age 47) Melbourne, Victoria
- Height: 170 cm (67 in) (2012)
- Weight: 75 kg (165 lb) (2012)

Sport
- Country: Australia
- Sport: Equestrian
- Event: Jumping
- Club: Rijd Met Belied Riding Club

James Paterson-Robinson (born 29 September 1978) is an Australian equestrian. He was selected to represent Australia at the 2012 Summer Olympics in equestrian jumping.

== Personal ==
Paterson-Robinson was born on 29 September 1978 in Melbourne, Victoria. He grew up in Geelong. He attended high school at Geelong College before going to Marcus Oldham College for a course in Horse Business Management. In 2000, he moved to Europe. As of June 2012, he lives in Swolgen, Netherlands.

As of 2012, Paterson-Robinson is 170 centimetres (67 in) tall and weighs 65 kilograms (143 lb).

== Equestrian ==
Paterson-Robinson is an equestrian jumping competitor. As of June 2012, he has been a member of Australia's national equestrian team for nine years. He has been coached by Ger Poels since 2008. His primary training base is located in Swolgen, Netherlands jumping. He is a member of the Rijd Met Belied Riding Club in Meerlo, Netherlands. Before that, he was a member of the Barwon Heads Pony Club.

Paterson-Robinson finished 1st at the 2012 Bourg-en-Bresse CSI4 Grand Prix held in Bourg-en-Bresse, France. He finished 4th at the 2012 Linz-Ebelsberg CSIO4 Grand Prix Table A held in Linz-Ebelsberg, Austria. He finished 12th at the 2012 Lummen CSIO4 Nations Cup held in Lummen, Belgium. He finished 9th at the 2012 Lummen CSI3 Grand Prix Table A held in Lummen, Belgium. He finished 48th at the CSI four-star at L'Et du Grand Parquet in the 1.50m class after he had eight faults in the competition.

Paterson-Robinson attempted to qualify for the 2004 Summer Olympics but had problems during qualification due to an injury to his horse. He has been selected to represent Australia at the 2012 Summer Olympics in equestrian. He will be riding Lanosso at his first Olympics. He finished in 41st place in the individual event.
