= Carlos Milthaler =

Chilean equestrian (born 1971)

Personal information
- Nationality: Chilean
- Born: 12 June 1971 (age 53)

Sport
- Sport: Equestrian

Carlos Milthaler (born 12 June 1971) is a Chilean equestrian. He competed at the 2000 Summer Olympics and the 2012 Summer Olympics.
