= Paul Estermann =

Swiss equestrian

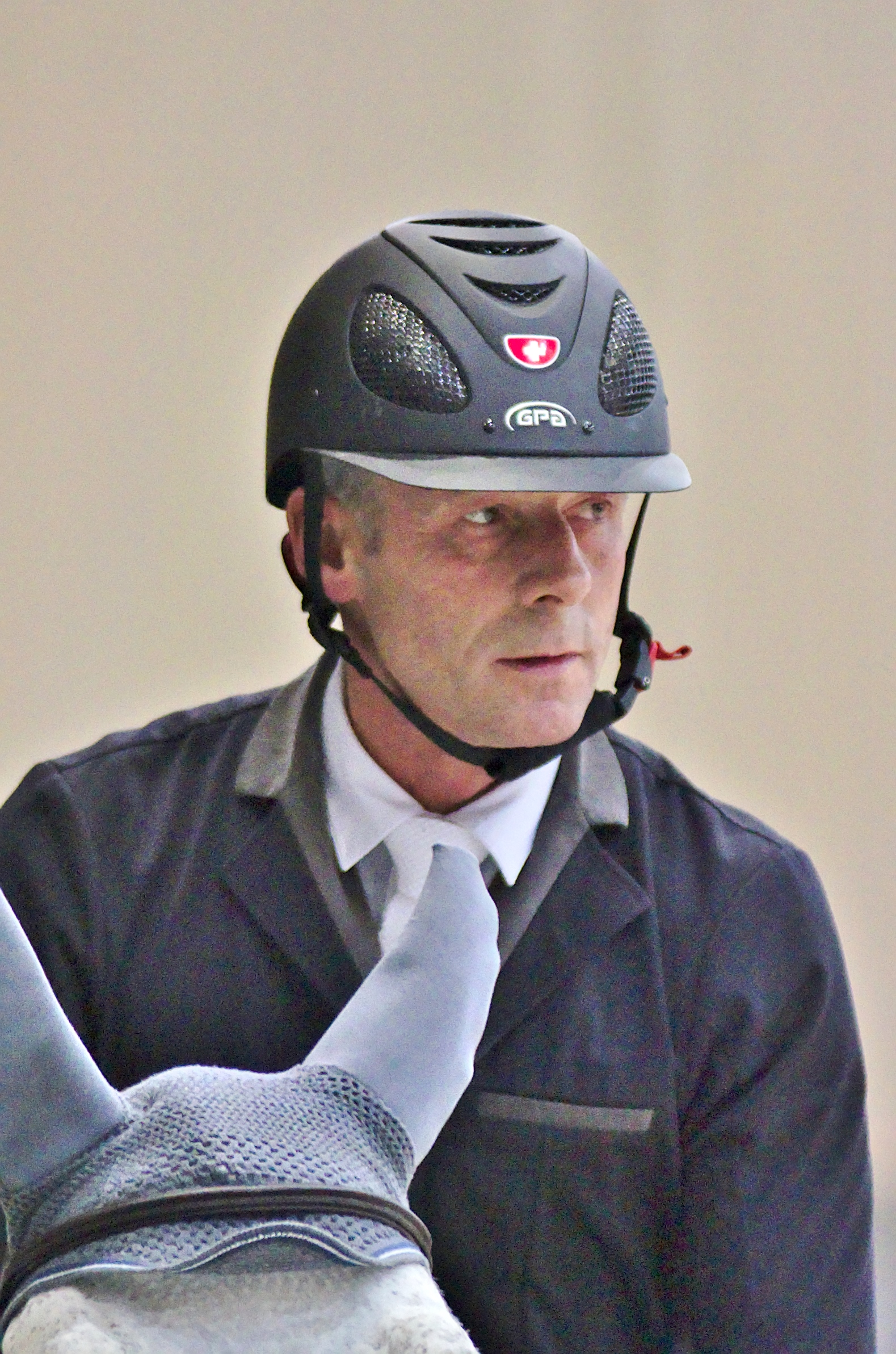
- Paul Estermann in 2013

Personal information
- Nationality: Switzerland
- Discipline: Show jumping
- Born: 24 June 1963 (age 62); Lucerne, LU
- Height: 1.80 m (5 ft 11 in)
- Weight: 77 kg (170 lb)
Medal record
European Championships
Bronze medal – third place	2015 Aachen	Team jumping

Paul Estermann (born 24 June 1963 in Lucerne, Canton of Lucerne) is a Swiss equestrian who competes in the sport of show jumping.

In June 2012, Paul Estermann was ranked 156 in the world.

In 2023, he was banned from equestrian sport for seven years after he was found guilty of animal cruelty.

== Career ==
Paul Estermann learnt to ride growing up on his family's farm in Traselinge, Switzerland. He began riding on a pony, then a jumper. During his apprenticeship as a farmer he devoted his leisure time to show jumping.

In 2012, he competed with Castelfield Eclipse at his first Olympics in the team jumping and individual jumping events.

== Personal life ==
Paul has one daughter and manages the equestrian centre (Reitsportcenter) Estermann in Hildisrieden, above Lake Sempach, where he is currently living.

== Horses ==
current horses:

- Castlefield Eclipse (Milly) (* 2002), Irish Sport Horse, Mare, Father's father: obos quality. Entrusted to Mr. Estermann by Jocelyn and Arturo Fasana.
- Quinara 13 (* 2003), Mare, Father: Quinto, Father's father: Quattro B, Mother: Poesie, Mother's father: Phantom.
- Maloubet du Temple (* 2000), Stallion, Father: Balubet du Rouet, Mother: Elverdie du Temple, Mother's father: Ouragan de Baussy.
- Lancero (* 2003), Gelding, Father: Lancer II, Father's father: Landgraf I, Mother: Olentia, Mother's father: Lentigo.
- Lafayette III (*2004), Mare, Father: Acorus, Father's father: Accord II, Mother: La Vie, Mother's father: Calido.

former show horses:

- Calinka II
- Kali de la Croix
- Zador
- Kaiser de Quesnoy
- Uddel
- Kobold V

== Successes ==
- Nations Cups:
  - July 2012: with Castlefield Eclipse - Rank 4 (Team) + Rank 4 (Individual)
  - June 2012: with Castlefield Eclipse - Rank 5 (Team) + Rank 5 (Individual)
  - May 2012: with Castlefield Eclipse - Rank 2 (Team) + Rank 2 (Individual)
