= Jaime Azcárraga =

Mexican equestrian

Personal information
- Born: 9 September 1959 (age 66) Mexico City, Mexico

Sport
- Sport: Equestrian
Medal record
Equestrian
Representing Mexico
Pan American Games
Bronze medal – third place	1983 Caracas	Team jumping

Jaime Azcárraga (born 9 September 1959) is a Mexican equestrian. He competed at the 1984, 1988, 1992 and the 2012 Summer Olympics. In 2015, he won the Thermal $1 million Grand Prix at HITS Desert Horse Park in Thermal, CA. In 2017, he also qualified for the Longines FEI World Cup.
