= Julia Hargreaves =

Australian equestrian

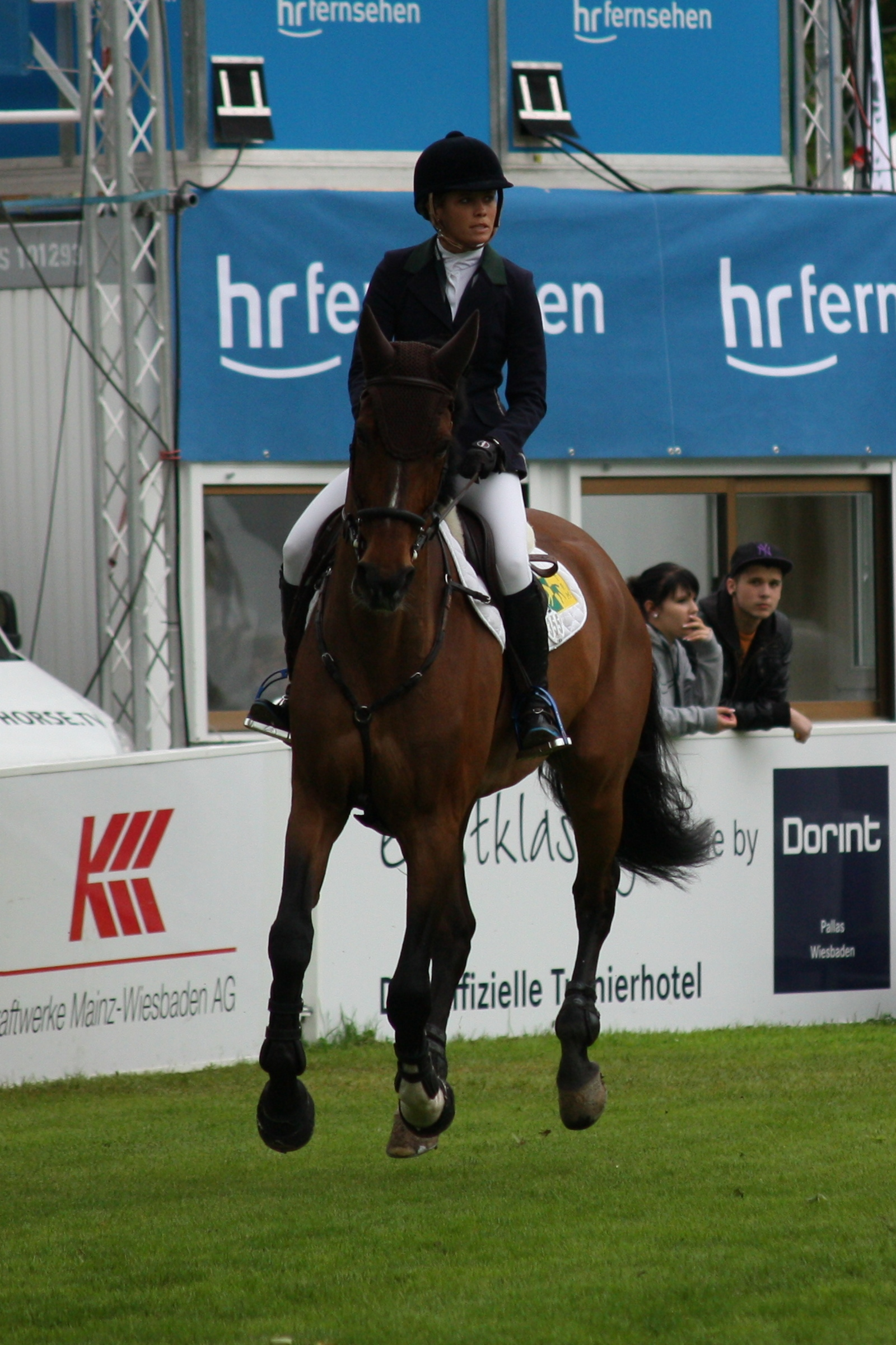
- Julia Hargreaves and Vedor (May 2013)

Personal information
- Nationality: Australian
- Born: 8 April 1986 (age 40) Hong Kong
- Height: 178 cm (5 ft 10 in) (2012)
- Weight: 57 kg (126 lb) (2012)

Sport
- Country: Australia
- Sport: Equestrian
- Event: Jumping
- Club: Copabella Sporthorses

Julia Hargreaves (born 8 April 1986) is an Australian equestrian. She represented Australia at the 2012 Summer Olympics in equestrian jumping.

== Personal ==
Hargreaves was born on 8 April 1986 in Hong Kong. She spent part of her childhood in the United States, and attended Saxe Middle School in Connecticut. When she was eleven years old, she moved to Australia, going to high school at Northholm Grammar School and New England Girls' School in New South Wales. She moved to the Netherlands in May 2011 in order to train with fellow Olympian Edwina Tops-Alexander, and lives there as of July 2012.

As of 2012, Hargreaves is 178 centimetres (5 ft 10 in) tall and weighs 57 kilograms (126 lb).

== Equestrian ==
Hargreaves started riding at seven years old in the Hong Kong jockey Club. She has been coached by George Sanna since 2005 and is also coached by Tops-Alexander. Her primary training base is in Sydney, Australia. She trains six days a week, and is a member of Copabella Sporthorses, Arcadia, New South Wales.

She competed in several competitions in 2011. She finished 24th at the 2011 La Coruna CSI5 Grand Prix held in La Coruna, Spain, finished 13th at the 2011 Wien Stadthalle CSI4 Table A held in Wien Stadthalle, Austria, finished first at the 2011 Sydney Royal CSI1 held in Sydney, Australia and finished eighth at the 2011 Zuidwolde CSI2 held in Zuidwolde, The Netherlands.

In 2012, she finished first at the 2012 Doha Global Champions Tour in Doha, Qatar; finished 12th at the 2012 Lummen CSIO4 National Cup and finish 38th at the 2012 Lummen CSIO4 Grand Prix, both in Lummen, Belgium; and finished 30th at the 2012 at the Dortmund CSI3 Grand Prix held in Dortmund, Germany.

Later in 2012, Hargreaves was selected, with her horse Vedor, to represent Australia at the 2012 Summer Olympics in her first Games, to participate in the equestrian team jumping and individual jumping events.

=== Performances ===
Finish	Year	Competition	Location	Reference
8th	2011	Zuidwolde CSI2*	Zuidwolde, The Netherlands	
24th	2011	La Coruna CSI5* Grand Prix	La Coruna, Spain	
1st	2011	Sydney Royal CSI1*-W	Sydney, Australia	
13th	2011	Wien Stadthalle CSI4* Table A	Wien Stadthalle, Austria	
1st	2012	Doha Global Champions Tour	Doha, Qatar	
30th	2012	Dortmund CSI3* Grand Prix	Dortmund, Germany	
38th	2012	Lummen CSIO4* Grand Prix	Lummen, Belgium	
12th	2012	Lummen CSIO4* Nations Cup	Lummen, Belgium	
