= Jens Fredricson =

Swedish equestrian (born 1967)

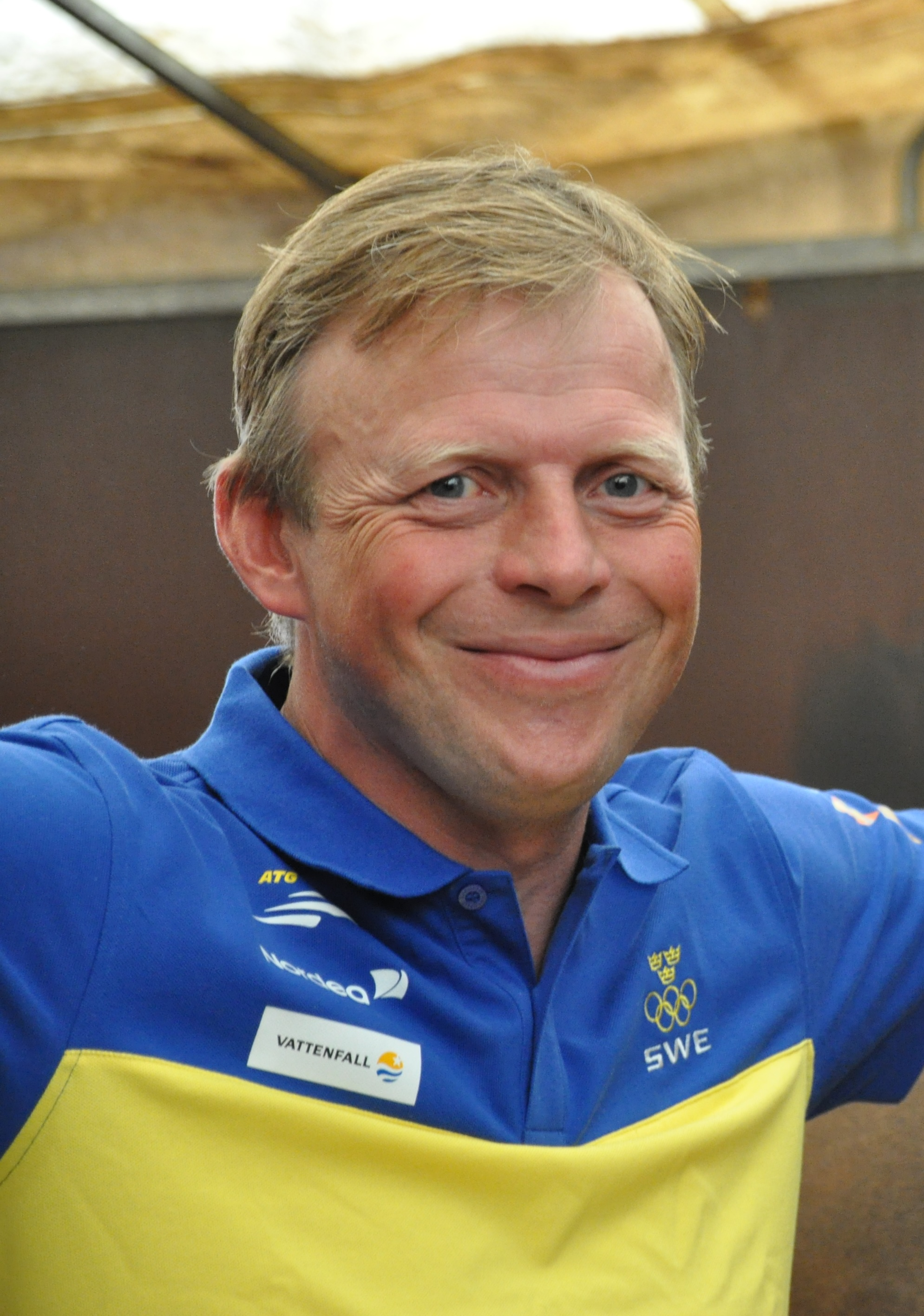
- Jens Fredricson in 2012

Personal information
- Nationality: Swedish
- Born: 14 December 1967 (age 58) Stockholm, Sweden

Sport
- Sport: Equestrian
Medal record
Equestrian
Representing Sweden
World Championships
Gold medal – first place	2022 Herning	Team jumping
World Cup
Bronze medal – third place	2022 Leipzig	Individual jumping

Jens Fredricson (born 14 December 1967) is a Swedish equestrian. He competed in two events at the 2012 Summer Olympics.
