= Nicolás Pizarro =

Mexican equestrian

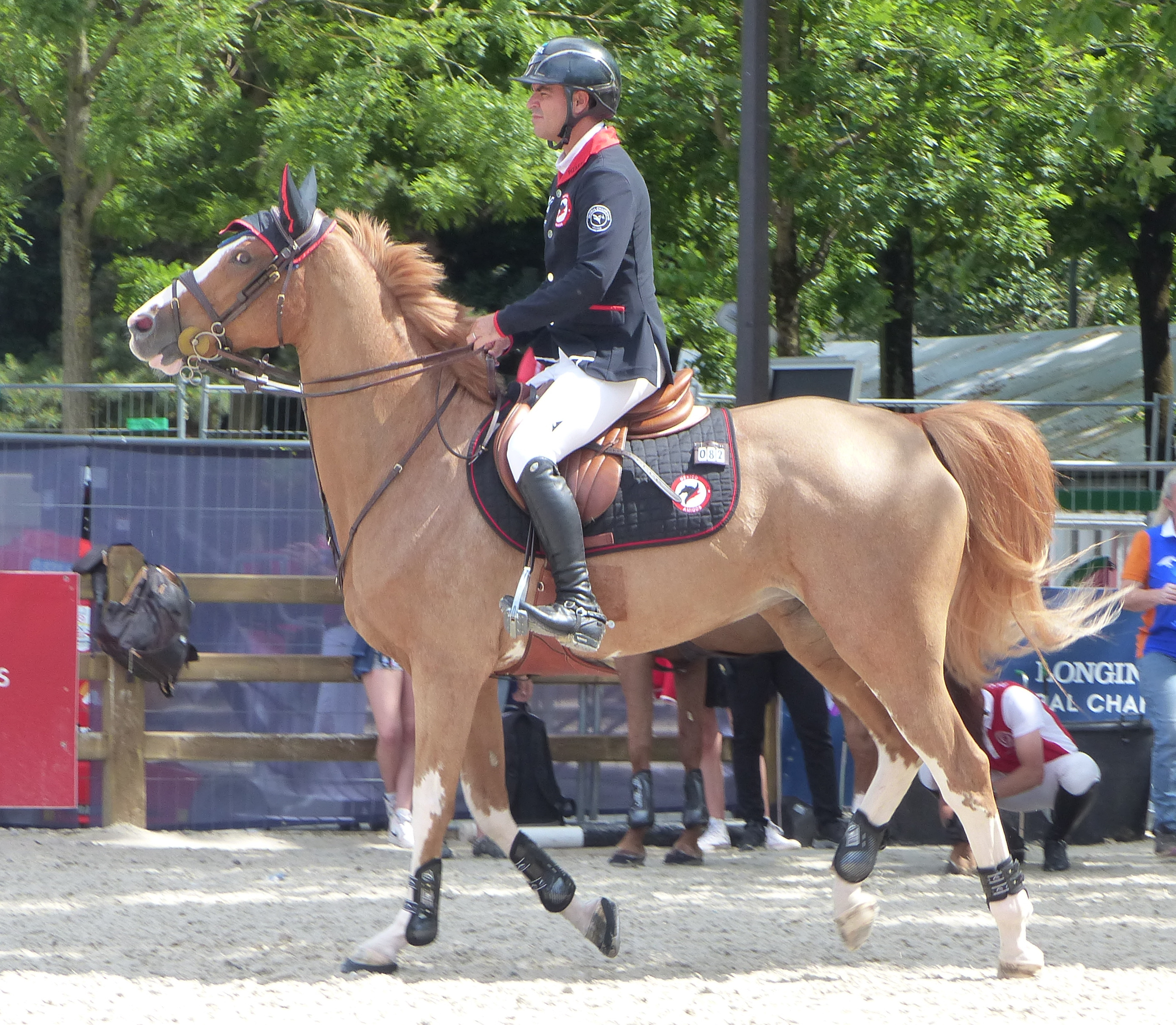

Personal information
- Born: 29 September 1978 (age 47) Mexico City, Mexico

Sport
- Sport: Equestrian

Nicolás Pizarro (born 29 September 1978) is a Mexican equestrian. He competed in two events at the 2012 Summer Olympics.
