= Equestrian at the 2015 Pan American Games – Individual jumping =

Individual jumping at the 2015 Pan American Games
- Venues: Caledon Equestrian Park
- Dates: July 21–25
- Competitors: 50 from 16 nations

Medalists
Gold medal	McLain Ward on Rothchild	United States
Silver medal	Andrés Rodríguez on Darlon Van Groenhove	Venezuela
Bronze medal	Lauren Hough on Ohlala	United States

The individual jumping competition of the equestrian events at the 2015 Pan American Games took place July 21–25 at the Caledon Equestrian Park. .

The top team not already qualified in the dressage team events qualified for the 2016 Summer Olympics in Rio de Janeiro, Brazil, along with the top two placed teams (not already qualified) in the show jumping competition. In the individual dressage competition, the top nation (not qualified in the team event) in groups IV and V each qualified one quota. The top six athletes (not qualified in the team event) also qualified for the show jumping competition.

== Schedule ==
All times are Central Standard Time (UTC-6).

Date	Time	Round
July 21, 2015	14:00	1st Qualifier
July 23, 2015	10:00	2nd Qualifier
July 23, 2015	13:30	3rd Qualifier
July 25, 2015	11:00	Round A
July 25, 2015	14:30	Round B

== Results ==
=== Qualification round ===
Rank	Rider	Nation	Horse	1st Qualifier	2nd Qualifier	3rd Qualifier	Total	Notes
1	Eduardo Menezes	Brazil	Quintol	0	1	0	1	Q
2	Yann Candele	Canada	Showgirl	0	1	1	2	Q
3	José Maria Larocca	Argentina	Cornet du Lys	1	1	1	3	Q
4	McLain Ward	United States	Rothchild	0	4	0	4	Q
4	Daniel Bluman	Colombia	Conconcreto Sancha LS	0	0	4	4	Q
4	Georgina Bloomberg	United States	Lilli	0	4	0	4	Q
4	Lauren Hough	United States	Ohlala	0	4	0	4	Q
4	Eric Lamaze	Canada	Coco Bongo	0	4	0	4	Q
9	Manuel Fernández	Dominican Republic	Al Calypso	4	1	0	5	Q
9	Pedro Veniss	Brazil	Quabri de L Isle	0	1	4	5	Q
9	Luis Pedro Birabén	Argentina	Abunola	0	0	5	5	Q
9	Kent Farrington	United States	Gazelle	0	5	0	5	
9	Samuel Parot de Ugarte	Chile	Couscous Van Orti	0	5	0	5	Q
9	Roberto Terán	Colombia	Woklahoma	0	0	5	5	Q
15	Nestor Nielsen Van Hoff	Uruguay	Prince Royal Z de la Luz	0	5	1	6	Q
15	Antonio Chedraui	Mexico	La Bamba	0	5	1	6	Q
15	Ian Millar	Canada	Dixson	0	1	5	6	Q
18	Tiffany Foster	Canada	Tripple X III	0	7	0	7	
18	Matías Albarracín	Argentina	Cannavaro 9	0	1	6	7	Q
20	Felipe Amaral	Brazil	Premiere Carthoes BZ	0	4	4	8	Q
21	Ramiro Quintana	Argentina	Whitney	4	5	0	9	
22	Fernando Cárdenas	Colombia	Quincy Car	0	1	9	10	Q
23	Emanuel Andrade	Venezuela	Hardrock Z	0	6	6	12	Q
23	Marlon Zanotelli	Brazil	Rock’n Roll Semilly	4	4	4	12	
25	Andrés Rodríguez	Venezuela	Darlon Van Groenhove	0	4	9	13	Q
25	René Lopez	Colombia	Con Dios III	2	6	5	13	
25	Pablo Barrios	Venezuela	Antares	0	8	5	13	Q
28	María Victoria Perez	Puerto Rico	W Zermie 13	4	5	5	14	Q
28	José Manuel Ibáñez	Chile	A S D Farfala	4	1	9	14	Q
30	Héctor Florentino	Dominican Republic	Allure G	0	10	5	15	Q
30	Martin Rodriguez Vanni	Uruguay	Liborius	4	9	2	15	Q
32	Alonso Valdéz	Peru	Ferrero van Overis	0	9	9	18	Q
33	Alvaro Tejada	Guatemala	Voltaral Palo Blanco	5	13	1	18	Q
33	Federico Fernández	Mexico	Guru	4	10	5	19	Q
35	Jillian Terceira	Bermuda	Tamerino	0	14	6	20	Q
35	Axel Barrios Enriquez	Guatemala	VDL Alberlino	0	14	6	20	Q
37	Carlos Morstadt	Chile	Talento	0	13	9	22	Q
38	Salvador Oñate	Mexico	Cartier	4	9	14	27	Q
39	Juan Andrés Rodríguez	Guatemala	Bugatti	17	10	2	29	Q
40	Juan Pivaral	Guatemala	Cento Per Cento CG	0	17	13	30	
40	José Martínez	Mexico	Nelson 212	4	5	21	30	
42	Patrick Nisbett	Bermuda	Quick Z	0	17	17	34	Q
43	Freddie Vázquez	Puerto Rico	Esprit De Vie	12	10	19	41	
44	Emily Kinch	Barbados	Teddy du Bosquetiau	12	21	13	46	
45	Marcelo Chirico	Uruguay	Acorbat Van T Laar Z	8	25	17	50	
	Diego Vivero	Ecuador	Bandurria Hulmen	8	30	RT	RT	
	Nicolás Imschenetzky	Chile	Pegase De Talma	10	5	EL	EL	
	Andres Alvarez	Ecuador	Cash Z	8	13	EL	EL	
	Juan Luzardo	Uruguay	Stan	0	11	EL	EL	
	Luis Larrazabal	Venezuela	G And C Close Up	4	EL	NS	EL	

=== Final rounds ===
Rank	Rider	Nation	Horse	Round A	Round B	Total	Jump-off	Notes
1st place, gold medalist(s)	McLain Ward	United States	Rothchild	0	0	0	0	
2nd place, silver medalist(s)	Andrés Rodríguez	Venezuela	Darlon Van Groenhove	0	0	0	4	
3rd place, bronze medalist(s)	Lauren Hough	United States	Ohlala	4	0	4	0	
4	José Maria Larocca	Argentina	Cornet du Lys	0	4	4	4	
5	Pedro Veniss	Brazil	Quabri de L Isle	4	0	4	4	
6	Emanuel Andrade	Venezuela	Hardrock Z	4	0	4	8	
7	Luis Pedro Birabén	Argentina	Abunola	4	0	4	8	
8	Matías Albarracín	Argentina	Cannavaro 9	4	1	5		
9	Nestor Nielsen Van Hoff	Uruguay	Prince Royal Z de la Luz	4	4	8		
9	Eduardo Menezes	Brazil	Quintol	4	4	8		
11	Alonso Valdéz	Peru	Ferrero van Overis	8	4	12		
11	Fernando Cárdenas	Colombia	Quincy Car	8	4	12		
11	Felipe Amaral	Brazil	Premiere Carthoes BZ	8	4	12		
11	Daniel Bluman	Colombia	Conconcreto Sancha LS	8	4	12		
11	Georgina Bloomberg	United States	Lilli	4	8	12		
16	Patrick Nisbett	Bermuda	Quick Z	8	5	13		
16	Héctor Florentino	Dominican Republic	Allure G	8	5	13		
16	Ian Millar	Canada	Dixson	8	5	13		
19	Yann Candele	Canada	Showgirl	8	8	16		
20	Martin Rodriguez Vanni	Uruguay	Liborius	9	10	19		
21	Juan Andrés Rodríguez	Guatemala	Bugatti	9	35	44		
22	Eric Lamaze	Canada	Coco Bongo	10				
23	Salvador Oñate	Mexico	Cartier	12				
23	Carlos Morstadt	Chile	Talento	12				
23	Federico Fernández	Mexico	Guru	12				
23	Pablo Barrios	Venezuela	Antares	12				
23	Antonio Chedraui	Mexico	La Bamba	12				
28	Alvaro Tejada	Guatemala	Voltaral Palo Blanco	16				
29	Samuel Parot de Ugarte	Chile	Couscous Van Orti	19				
30	Jillian Terceira	Bermuda	Tamerino	20				
30	Manuel Fernández	Dominican Republic	Al Calypso	20				
32	Freddie Vázquez	Puerto Rico	Esprit De Vie	23				
33	María Victoria Perez	Puerto Rico	W Zermie 13	27				
	José Manuel Ibáñez	Chile	A S D Farfala	EL				
	Axel Barrios Enriquez	Guatemala	VDL Alberlino	EL				
