= Equestrian at the 2023 Pan American Games – Individual jumping =

Individual jumping at the 2023 Pan American Games
- Venue: Granaderos Regiment Equestrian School
- Dates: October 31 - November 3
- Competitors: 52 from 17 nations
- Winning score: 8.06

Medalists
Gold medal	Stephan Barcha	Brazil
Silver medal	Kent Farrington	United States
Bronze medal	McLain Ward	United States

The individual jumping competition of the equestrian events at the 2023 Pan American Games was held from October 31 to November 3 at the Granaderos Regiment Equestrian School (Escuela de Equitación Regimiento Granaderos) in Quillota, Chile.

== Schedule ==
Date	Time	Round
October 31, 2023	11:30	Round 1
November 1, 2023	11:00	Round 2-1
November 1, 2023	14:30	Round 2-2
November 3, 2023	11:00	Final Round A
November 3, 2023	14:00	Final Round B

== Results ==
The results were as follows:

=== Qualification round ===
Rank	Rider	Nation	Horse	1st Qualifier	2nd Qualifier	3rd Qualifier	Total	Notes
1	McLain Ward	United States	Contagious	3.34	0	0	3.34	Q
2	Laura Kraut	United States	Dorado 212	3.39	0	0	3.39	Q
3	Stephan Barcha	Brazil	Chevaux Primacera Imperio Egipcio	4.06	0	0	4.06	Q
4	Pedro Veniss	Brazil	Nimrod de Muze Z	0.26	4	0	4.26	Q
5	Tiffany Foster	Canada	Figor	4.40	0	0	4.40	Q
6	Nicolás Pizarro	Mexico	Pia Contra	5.26	0	0	5.26	Q
7	Eugenio Garza Pérez	Mexico	Contago	1.63	4	0	5.63	Q
8	Kent Farrington	United States	Landon	5.64	0	0	5.64	Q
9	Amy Millar	Canada	Truman	1.71	4	0	5.71	Q
10	Luis Larrazabal	Venezuela	Condara	2.41	4	0	6.41	Q
11	Beth Underhill	Canada	Nikka Vd Bisschop	4.02	4	0	8.02	Q
12	Damian Ancic	Argentina	Santa Rosa Chabacon	5.57	3	0	9.57	Q
13	Roberto Terán	Colombia	Dex' Ooktoff	2.23	4	4	10.23	Q
14	Ignacio Maurin	Argentina	Chaquitos PS	2.69	0	8	10.69	Q
15	Mario Deslauriers	Canada	Emerson	3.89	4	4	11.89	
16	Leandro Moschini	Argentina	Abril Iconthon	5.05	7	0	12.05	Q
17	René Lopez	Colombia	Kheros Van'T Hoogeinde	0.72	8	4	12.72	Q
18	Samuel Parot Jr	Chile	Hfb Versace	9.09	4	0	13.09	Q
19	José María Larocca	Argentina	Finn Lente	4.27	4	5	13.27	Q
20	José Antonio Chedraui	Mexico	H-Lucky Retto	11.12	0	4	15.12	Q
21	Rodrigo Pessoa	Brazil	Major Tom	4.55	4	8	16.55	Q
22	Agustín Covarrubias	Chile	Nelson du Petit Vivier	4.96	8	6		Q
23	Jorge Matte	Chile	Winning Good	4.90	10	5	19.00	Q
24	Federico Fernández	Mexico	Romeo	7.33	8	8	23.33	Q
25	Nicolás Gamboa	Colombia	Nkh Mr. Darcy	5.15	8	12	25.15	Q
26	Vasco Flores	Puerto Rico	Cosmona	6.80	13	6	25.80	Q
27	Karl Cook	United States	Caracole de La Roque	19.28	12	0	31.28	Q
28	Alonso Valdez	Peru	Acuero	3.52	24	4	31.52	Q
29	Juan Ortiz	Venezuela	Catch the Dark Z	10.61	8	14	32.61	Q
30	Martín Rodríguez Vanni	Uruguay	Champagne du Soleil	5.94	19	8	32.94	Q
31	Victoria Huertematte	Panama	Scarlett du Sart Z	6.03	17	17	40.03	Q
32	Juan Serra	Uruguay	Quebelle	18.73	10	13	41.73	Q
33	Alexandr Imschenetzky	Chile	Caspaccio	6.89	34	8	48.89	Q
34	Raúl Guarino de Oliveira	Uruguay	Quaido	10.90	15	25	50.90	Q
35	Wylder Rodríguez	Independent Athletes Team	Highway S	14.37	16	21	51.37	Q
36	Denis Gouvea	Paraguay	Lanciano SP	13.54	19	21	53.54	R1
37	Reynaldo Daza	Bolivia	Doria One Loar Mystic Rose	17.96	25	25	67.96	R2
38	Andrés Soto	Dominican Republic	Optimus Blue	55.31	19	8	82.31	R3
39	Gonzalo Meza	Ecuador	Diago	17.16	38	ABST		
39	John Pérez Bohm	Colombia	Gigi-Carmen	4.34	EL	41	97.94	
39	Marlon Zanotelli	Brazil	Deesse de Coquerie	0.00	21	RET		
42	Juan Gonzalez	Ecuador	Demon	12.95	EL			
42	Ana Sandoval	Ecuador	My Lord's Way	14.72	EL			
42	Diego Bedoya	Bolivia	Skara Glen's Para Bellum	55.31	RET			
42	Martín Vera	Paraguay	Della Cornet	35.51	EL			
42	Anna Gansauer	Ecuador	Day Dream	13.31	EL			

=== Final rounds ===
Rank	Rider	Nation	Horse	Round A	Round B	Total	Notes
1st place, gold medalist(s)	Stephan Barcha	Brazil	Chevaux Primacera Imperio Egipcio	0	4	8.06	
2nd place, silver medalist(s)	Kent Farrington	United States	Landon	4	0	9.64	
3rd place, bronze medalist(s)	McLain Ward	United States	Contagious	8	4	15.34	
4	Laura Kraut	United States	Dorado 212	4	8	15.39	
5	Pedro Veniss	Brazil	Nimrod de Muze Z	8	4	16.26	
6	Amy Millar	Canada	Truman	8	4	17.71	
7	Roberto Terán	Colombia	Dex' Ooktoff	4	4	18.23	
8	José María Larocca	Argentina	Finn Lente	0	5	18.27	
9	Beth Underhill	Canada	Nikka Vd Bisschop	9	4	21.02	
10	Leandro Moschini	Argentina	Abril Iconthon	4	5	21.05	
11	Eugenio Garza Pérez	Mexico	Contago	4	12	21.63	
12	Ignacio Maurin	Argentina	Chaquitos PS	4	8	22.69	
13	Agustín Covarrubias	Chile	Nelson du Petit Vivier	0	6	24.96	
14	Tiffany Foster	Canada	Figor	12	10	26.4	
15	Luis Larrazabal	Venezuela	Condara	12	8	26.41	
16	René Lopez	Colombia	Kheros Van'T Hoogeinde	8	9	29.72	
17	Samuel Parot Jr	Chile	Hfb Versace	9	8	30.09	
18	Jorge Matte	Chile	Winning Good	8	12	39.9	
19	Nicolás Gamboa	Colombia	Nkh Mr. Darcy	16	8	49.15	
20	Nicolás Pizarro	Mexico	Pia Contra	16	ABST		
21	Alonso Valdez	Peru	Acuero	16		47.52	
22	Vasco Flores	Puerto Rico	Cosmona	28		53.8	
23	Victoria Huertematte	Panama	Scarlett du Sart Z	23		63.03	
24	Wylder Rodríguez	Independent Athletes Team	Highway S	19		70.37	
25	Denis Gouvea	Paraguay	Lanciano SP	26		79.54	
26	Raúl Guarino de Oliveira	Uruguay	Quaido	41		91.9	
27	Juan Ortiz	Venezuela	Catch the Dark Z	RET			
28	Juan Serra	Uruguay	Quebelle	RET			
