= Equestrian at the 2015 Pan American Games – Team jumping =

Team jumping at the 2015 Pan American Games
- Venues: Caledon Equestrian Park; Pan Am Cross-Country Centre (Cross country–eventing)
- Dates: July 21–23, 2015.
- Competitors: 40 from 10 nations

Medalists
Gold medal	Yann Candele on Showgirl; Tiffany Foster on Tripple X III; Eric Lamaze on Coco Bongo; Ian Millar on Dixson	Canada
Silver medal	José María Larocca on Cornet du Lys; Matías Albarracín on Cannavaro 9 Luis Pedro Birabén on Abunola; Ramiro Quintana on Whitney	Argentina
Bronze medal	McLain Ward on Rothchild; Georgina Bloomberg on Lilli; Lauren Hough on Ohlala; Kent Farrington on Gazelle	United States

The team jumping competition of the equestrian events at the 2015 Pan American Games took place July 21–23 at the Caledon Equestrian Park.

The top team not already qualified in the dressage team events qualified for the 2016 Summer Olympics in Rio de Janeiro, Brazil, along with the top two placed teams (not already qualified) in the show jumping competition. In the individual dressage competition, the top nation (not qualified in the team event) in groups IV and V each qualified one quota. The top six athletes (not qualified in the team event) also qualified for the show jumping competition.

== Schedule ==
All times are Central Standard Time (UTC-6).

Date	Time	Round
July 21, 2015	14:00	1st Qualifier
July 23, 2015	10:00	1st Round
July 23, 2015	13:30	2nd Round

== Results ==
Rank	Nation	Name	Horse	1st Round			2nd Round			Total Pen.
Rank	Nation	Name	Horse	Ind. Pen.	Team Pen.	Rank	Ind. Pen.	Team Pen.	Rank	Total Pen.
1st place, gold medalist(s)	Canada	Yann Candele; Tiffany Foster; Eric Lamaze; Ian Millar	Showgirl; Tripple X III; Coco Bongo; Dixson	1 # 7; 4; 1	6	3	1; 0; 0 # 5	1	2	7
2nd place, silver medalist(s)	Argentina	Ramiro Quintana; Matías Albarracín; Luis Pedro Birabén; José Maria Larocca	Whitney; Cannavaro 9 Abunola; Cornet du Lys	# 5; 1; 0; 1	2	2	0 # 6; 5; 1	6	3	8
3rd place, bronze medalist(s)	United States	McLain Ward; Georgina Bloomberg; Lauren Hough; Kent Farrington	Rothchild; Lilli; Ohlala; Gazelle	4; 4; 4 # 5	12	6	0 # 0; 0; 0	0	1	12
4	Brazil	Pedro Veniss; Felipe Amaral; Eduardo Menezes; Marlon Zanotelli	Quabri de L Isle; Premiere Carthoes BZ; Quintol; Rock’n Roll Semilly	1 # 4; 1; 4	6	3	4 # 4; 0; 4	8	4	14
5	Colombia	Daniel Bluman; René Lopez; Fernando Cárdenas; Roberto Terán	Conconcreto Sancha LS; Con Dios III; Quincy Car; Woklahoma	0 # 6; 1; 1	1	1	4; 5 # 9; 5	14	6	15
6	Chile	Nicolás Imschenetzky; Carlos Morstadt; José Manuel Ibáñez; Samuel Parot de Ugarte	Pegase De Talma; Talento; A S D Farfala; Couscous Van Orti	5 # 14; 1; 5	11	5	# EL; 9; 9; 0	18	7	29
7	Venezuela	Luis Larrazabal; Andrés Rodríguez; Emanuel Andrade; Pablo Barrios	G And C Close Up; Darlon Van Groenhove; Hardrock Z Antares	# EL; 4; 6; 8	18	7	– 9; 6; 5	20	8	38
8	Mexico	Antonio Chedraui; Salvador Oñate; José Martínez; Federico Fernández	La Bamba; Cartier; Nelson 212; Guru	5; 9; 5 # 10	19	8	1; 14 # 21; 5	20	8	39
9	Uruguay	Nestor Nielsen Van Hoff; Martin Rodriguez Vanni; Juan Luzardo; Marcelo Chirico	Prince Royal Z de la Luz; Liborius; Stan2; Acorbat Van T Laar Z	5; 9; 11 # 25	25	9	1; 2 # EL; 17	20	8	45
10	Guatemala	Juan Pivaral; Axel Barrios Enriquez; Juan Andrés Rodríguez; Alvaro Tejada	Cento Per Cento CG; VDL Alberlino; Bugatti; Voltaral Palo Blanco	# 17; 14; 10; 13	37	10	# 13; 6; 2; 1	9	5	46
