= Equestrian at the 2023 Pan American Games – Team jumping =

Team jumping at the 2023 Pan American Games
- Venue: Granaderos Regiment Equestrian School
- Dates: October 31 - November 1
- Competitors: 35 from 9 nations

Medalists
Gold medal	McLain Ward on Contagious; Karl Cook on Caracole de La Roque; Kent Farrington on Landon; Laura Kraut on Dorado 212	United States
Silver medal	Tiffany Foster on Figor; Mario Deslauriers on Emerson; Amy Millar on Truman; Beth Underhill on Nikka Vd Bisschop	Canada
Bronze medal	Pedro Veniss on Nimrod de Muze Z Marlon Zanotelli on Deesse de Coquerie; Stephan Barcha on Chevaux Primavera Imperio Egipcio; Rodrigo Pessoa on Major Tom	Brazil

The team jumping competition of the equestrian events at the 2023 Pan American Games was held from October 31 to November 3 at the Granaderos Regiment Equestrian School (Escuela de Equitación Regimiento Granaderos) in Quillota, Chile.

Nine NOCs competed in groups of four athletes, except Uruguay, which had a grup of three athletes.

== Schedule ==
Date	Time	Round
October 31, 2023	11:30	Round 1
November 1, 2023	11:00	Final - Round 2-1
November 1, 2023	14:30	Final - Round 2-2

== Results ==
The results were as follows:

Rank	Nation	Name	Horse	1st Round			2nd Round A			2nd Round B			Total Pen.
Rank	Nation	Name	Horse	Ind. Pen.	Team Pen.	Rank	Ind. Pen.	Team Pen.	Rank	Ind. Pen.	Team Pen.	Rank	Total Pen.
1st place, gold medalist(s)	United States	McLain Ward; Karl Cook; Kent Farrington; Laura Kraut	"Contagious" "Caracole de La Roque" "Landon" "Dorado 212"	3.34; 19.28; 5.64; 3.39	12.37	5	0; 12; 0; 0	0	2	0; 0; 0; 0	0	1	12.37
2nd place, silver medalist(s)	Canada	Tiffany Foster; Mario Deslauriers; Amy Millar; Beth Underhill	"Figor" "Emerson" "Truman" "Nikka Vd Bisschop"	4.40; 3.89; 1.71; 4.02	9.62	3	0; 4; 4; 4	8	2	0; 4; 0; 0	0	2	17.62
3rd place, bronze medalist(s)	Brazil	Pedro Veniss; Marlon Zanotelli; Stephan Barcha; Rodrigo Pessoa	"Nimrod de Muze Z" "Deesse de Coquerie" "Chevaux Primavera Imperio Egipcio" "Major Tom"	0.26; 0.00; 4.06; 4.55	4.32	1	4; 21; 0; 4	8	3	0 RET; 0; 8	8	3	20.32
4	Mexico	Eugenio Garza; Nicolás Pizarro; Federico Fernández; José Antonio Chedraui	"Contago" "Pia Contra" "Romeo" "H-Lucky Retto"	1.63; 5.62; 7.33; 11.12	14.58	4	4; 0; 8; 0	4	4	0; 0; 8; 4	4	4	22.58
5	Argentina	Leandro Moschini; Damián Ancic; Ignacio Maurin; José María Larocca	"Abril Iconthon" "Santa Rosa Chabacon" "Chaquitos PS" "Finn Lente"	5.05; 5.57; 2.69; 4.27	12.01	5	7; 4; 0; 4	8	5	0; 0; 8; 5	5	5	25.01
6	Colombia	John Pérez Bohm; Nicolás Gamboa; René López; Roberto Terán	"Gigi-Carmen" "Nkh Mr. Darcy" "Kheros Van'T Hoogeinde" "Dez' Ooktoff"	4.34; 5.15; 0.72; 2.23	7.29	6	EL; 8; 8; 4	20	6	41; 12; 4; 4	20	6	47.29
7	Chile	Agustín Covarrubias; Jorge Matte; Alexandr Imschenetzky; Samuel Parot Jr	"Nelson du Petit Vivier" "Winning Good" "Caspaccio" "Hfb Versace"	4.96; 4.90; 6.89; 9.09	16.75	7	8; 10; 24; 4	22	7	6; 5; 8; 0	11	7	49.75
8	Uruguay	Sebastián Guarino; Juan Serra; Martín Rodríguez	"Quaido" "Quebelle" "Champagne du Soleil"	10.90; 18.73; 5.94	35.57	8	15; 10; 19	44	8	25; 13; 8	46	8	125.57
9	Ecuador	Gonzalo Meza; Juan González; Ana Sandoval; Anna Gansauer	"Diago" "Demon" "My Lord's Way" "Day Dream"	17.16; 12.95; 14.72; 13.31	40.92	9	38; EL; EL; EL	EL	9				
