= Equestrian at the 2016 Summer Olympics – Team jumping =

Team jumping at the Games of the XXXI Olympiad
- Venue: National Equestrian Center
- Date: 14–17 August 2016
- Competitors: 75 from 15 nations

Medalists
1st place, gold medalist(s)		Philippe Rozier; Kevin Staut; Roger-Yves Bost; Pénélope Leprevost	France
2nd place, silver medalist(s)		Kent Farrington; Lucy Davis; McLain Ward; Elizabeth Madden	United States
3rd place, bronze medalist(s)		Daniel Deusser; Meredith Michaels-Beerbaum; Ludger Beerbaum; Christian Ahlmann	Germany

The team jumping in equestrian at the 2016 Summer Olympics in Rio de Janeiro was held at National Equestrian Center on 14, 16 and 17 August.

The medals were presented by Camiel Eurlings, IOC member, The Netherlands and Ingmar De Vos, President of the FEI.

== Competition format ==
Five rounds of jumping were conducted in total. The second and third rounds were used for the team jumping event. Final rankings were based on the sum of scores of the three best riders from both rounds. A jump-off was held to break a tie for the bronze medal position.

== Schedule ==
All times are Brasília Time (UTC–3)

Date	Time	Round
Sunday, 14 August 2016	10:00	Qualification
Tuesday, 16 August 2016	10:00	Round 1
Wednesday, 17 August 2016	10:00	Round 2 Jump-off

== Results ==
Rank	Name	Round 1		Round 2		Team total penalties	Jump-off			
Rank	Name	Penalties		Penalties		Team total penalties	Penalties		Time	
Rank	Name	Individual	Team	Individual	Team	Team total penalties	Individual	Team	Individual	Team
1st place, gold medalist(s)	France; Philippe Rozier; Kevin Staut; Roger-Yves Bost; Pénélope Leprevost	~~4~~; 0; 1; 0	1	1; 0; 1; ~~NS~~	2	3				
2nd place, silver medalist(s)	United States; Kent Farrington; Lucy Davis; McLain Ward; Elizabeth Madden	0; 0; 0; ~~8~~	0	1; 4; 0; ~~WD~~	5	5				
3rd place, bronze medalist(s)	Germany; Daniel Deusser; Meredith Michaels-Beerbaum; Ludger Beerbaum; Christian Ahlmann	0; 0; 0; ~~4~~	0	4; ~~5~~; 4; 0	8	8	0; 0; 0; ~~NS~~	0	42.68; 55.35; 44.58	
4	Canada; Yann Candele; Tiffany Foster; Amy Millar; Eric Lamaze	0; 4; ~~5~~; 0	4	4; 0; ~~12~~; 0	4	8	4; 0; 4; ~~NS~~	8	44.24; 44.81; 43.06	
5	Brazil; Eduardo Menezes; Stephan Barcha; Álvaro de Miranda Neto; Pedro Veniss	0; ~~DSQ~~; 0; 0	0	4; ~~DSQ~~; 4; 5	13	13				
6	Switzerland; Janika Sprunger; Romain Duguet; Martin Fuchs; Steve Guerdat	8; 0; 0; ~~8~~	8	1; 5; ~~5~~; 1	7	15				
7	Sweden; Malin Baryard-Johnsson; Peder Fredricson; Henrik von Eckermann; Rolf-Göran Bengtsson	4; 0; 4; ~~4~~	8	~~17~~; 1; 8; 1	10	18				
8	Netherlands; Jeroen Dubbeldam; Maikel van der Vleuten; Harrie Smolders; Jur Vrieling	0; 0; 0; ~~EL~~	0	5; 1; 12; ~~WD~~	18	18				
9	Qatar; Hamad Ali Mohamed A Al Attiyah; Ali bin Chalid Al Thani; Ali Yousef Al Rumaihi; Bassem Hassan Mohammed	~~5~~; 4; 1; 4	9							
10	Argentina; Ramiro Quintana; Bruno Passaro; Matías Albarracín; José Maria Larocca	1; ~~24~~; 1; 8	10							
11	Spain; Pilar Lucrecia Cordón; Manuel Fernandez Saro; Eduardo Álvarez Aznar; Sergio Álvarez Moya	8; 4; ~~EL~~; 0	12							
12	Great Britain; Nick Skelton; Ben Maher; Michael Whitaker; John Whitaker	4; 4; 5; ~~23~~	13							
13	Ukraine; Cassio Rivetti; Ulrich Kirchhoff; Ferenc Szentirmai; René Tebbel	~~DSQ~~; 4; 9; 1	14							
13	Japan; Toshiki Masui; Daisuke Fukushima; Reiko Takeda; Taizo Sugitani	12; 1; 1; ~~12~~	14							
13	Australia; Matt Williams; Scott Keach; Edwina Tops-Alexander; James Paterson-Robinson	0; ~~EL~~; 5; 9	14							
