= Equestrian at the 2016 Summer Olympics – Individual jumping =

Individual jumping at the Games of the XXXI Olympiad
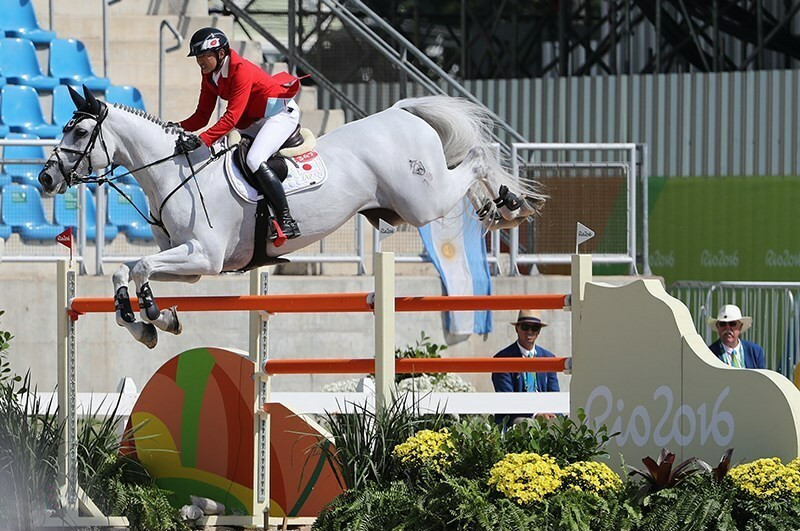
- A competitor making a jump
- Venue: Olympic Equestrian Centre
- Dates: 14–19 August 2016
- Competitors: 74 from 27 nations
- Winning total: 0 penalties, 42.82 s in the jump off

Medalists
1st place, gold medalist(s)		Nick Skelton; Great Britain
2nd place, silver medalist(s)		Peder Fredricson; Sweden
3rd place, bronze medalist(s)		Eric Lamaze; Canada

The individual show jumping in equestrian at the Rio 2016 Summer Olympics was held from 14–19 August. Like all other equestrian events, the jumping competition was mixed gender, with both male and female athletes competing in the same division. There were 74 competitors from 27 nations. The event was won by Nick Skelton of Great Britain, the nation's first victory in individual jumping and first medal of any color since making the podium four consecutive Games from 1960 to 1972. Silver went to Peder Fredricson of Sweden. Eric Lamaze of Canada took bronze, becoming the first person since 1968 and sixth overall to win multiple medals (adding to his 2008 gold).

The medals were presented by Gerardo Werthein, IOC member, Argentina and Luiz Roberto Giugni, Executive Board Member of the FEI.

== Background ==
This was the 25th appearance of the event, which had first been held at the 1900 Summer Olympics and has been held at every Summer Olympics at which equestrian sports have been featured (that is, excluding 1896, 1904, and 1908). It is the oldest event on the current programme, the only one that was held in 1900.

Three of the top 11 riders (including ties for 9th place) from the 2012 Games returned: gold medalist Steve Guerdat of Switzerland, fifth-place finisher Nick Skelton of Great Britain, and ninth-place finisher Ben Maher of Great Britain. Also returning was 2008 gold medalist Eric Lamaze of Canada, who reached the first round of the final in 2012. Ludger Beerbaum of Germany, the 1992 gold medalist, was back for his seventh Games after missing 2012. The reigning World Champion was Jeroen Dubbeldam of the Netherlands.

Chinese Taipei, Morocco, Peru, and Qatar each made their debut in the event. France and the United States both competed for the 22nd time, tied for most of any nation.

== Qualification ==
Each National Olympic Committee (NOC) could qualify up to 4 horse and rider pairs; there were a total of 75 quota places. Each of the 15 nations qualified for the team jumping could enter 4 pairs in the individual event. The qualified teams were:

- Host Brazil
- 5 teams from the World Equestrian Games: the Netherlands, France, the United States, Germany, and Sweden
- 3 teams from the European Jumping Championship: Switzerland, Great Britain, and Spain
- 2 teams from the Pan American Games: Canada and Argentina
- 1 team from the Group C qualification event: Ukraine
- 1 team from the Group F qualification event: Qatar
- 2 teams from the Group G qualification event: Japan and Australia

There were also 15 individual qualification places, with NOCs not earning team spots able to earn up to 2 individual spots. Most were assigned through regional groups, though some places were open to all competitors:

- Group A had one spot, assigned through rankings
- Group B had one spot, assigned through rankings
- Group C had one spot, assigned through rankings
- Groups D and E had six spots, assigned through the Pan American Games
- Group F had one spot, assigned through rankings
- Group G had one spot, assigned through a qualification event
- The remaining four spots were assigned to the top four remaining ranked riders, regardless of regional group

== Competition format ==
The competition used the five-round, two-stage format introduced in 1992. The first three rounds made up the qualifications, with cuts between each round. The top 60 advanced to the second round; the top 45 advanced to the third round. The second and third rounds were also used for the team jumping event. Following the qualifications, the top 35 pairs moved on to the final round. Only the top 20 pairs advanced to the second of the two final rounds. Final rankings were based on the sum of scores from both rounds of the final stage. A jump-off would be held to break a tie for any of the medal positions.

== Schedule ==
All times are UTC−03:00

Date	Time	Round
Sunday, 14 August 2016	10:00	Qualifying round 1
Tuesday, 16 August 2016	10:00	Qualifying round 2
Wednesday, 17 August 2016	10:00	Qualifying round 3
Friday, 19 August 2016	10:00; 13:30	Final round A Final round B

== Results ==
=== Qualifying round ===
==== Round 1 ====
The first qualifying round was run on a course with an allowed time of 82 seconds.

Rank	Rider	Nation	Horse	Penalties			Notes
Rank	Rider	Nation	Horse	Jump	Time	Total	Notes
1	Christian Ahlmann	Germany	Taloubet Z	0	0	0	Q
1	Kent Farrington	United States	Voyeur	0	0	0	Q
1	Janika Sprunger	Switzerland	Bonne Chance CW	0	0	0	Q
1	Philippe Rozier	France	Rahotep de Toscane	0	0	0	Q
1	Stephan Barcha	Brazil	Landpeter do Feroleto	0	0	0	Q
1	Meredith Michaels-Beerbaum	Germany	Fibonacci	0	0	0	Q
1	Jérôme Guery	Belgium	Gran Cru Van de Roz	0	0	0	Q
1	Maikel van der Vleuten	Netherlands	Verdi	0	0	0	Q
1	Sheikh Ali Al-Thani	Qatar	First Division	0	0	0	Q
1	Peder Fredricson	Sweden	All In	0	0	0	Q
1	Álvaro de Miranda Neto	Brazil	Cornetto K	0	0	0	Q
1	Daniel Deusser	Germany	First Class	0	0	0	Q
1	Edwina Tops-Alexander	Australia	Lintea Tequila	0	0	0	Q
1	Amy Millar	Canada	Heros	0	0	0	Q
1	Roger-Yves Bost	France	Sydney une Prince	0	0	0	Q
1	Henrik von Eckermann	Sweden	Yajamila	0	0	0	Q
1	Pedro Veniss	Brazil	Quabri de l'Isle	0	0	0	Q
1	Karim El-Zoghby	Egypt	Amelia	0	0	0	Q
1	John Whitaker	Great Britain	Ornellaia	0	0	0	Q
1	Harrie Smolders	Netherlands	Emerald	0	0	0	Q
1	Eric Lamaze	Canada	Fine Lady 5	0	0	0	Q
1	Sergio Álvarez Moya	Spain	Carlo 273	0	0	0	Q
1	Steve Guerdat	Switzerland	Nino des Buissonets	0	0	0	Q
1	Rene Tebbel	Ukraine	Zipper	0	0	0	Q
25	Ali Al-Rumaihi	Qatar	Gunder	0	1	1	Q
25	Nestor Nielsen van Hoff	Uruguay	Prince Royal Z de la Luz	0	1	1	Q
27	Eduardo Menezes	Brazil	Quintol	4	0	4	Q
27	Nick Skelton	Great Britain	Big Star	4	0	4	Q
27	Jeroen Dubbeldam	Netherlands	Zenith	4	0	4	Q
27	Yann Candele	Canada	First Choice 15	4	0	4	Q
27	Pilar Lucrecia Cordón	Spain	Gribouille du Lys	4	0	4	Q
27	Abdelkebir Ouaddar	Morocco	Quickly de Kreisker	4	0	4	Q
27	Ben Maher	Great Britain	Tic Tac	4	0	4	Q
27	Scott Keach	Australia	Fedor	4	0	4	Q
27	Lucy Davis	United States	Barron	4	0	4	Q
27	Tiffany Foster	Canada	Tripple X III	4	0	4	Q
27	Manuel Fernández Saro	Spain	U Watch	4	0	4	Q
27	Romain Duguet	Switzerland	Quorida de Treho	4	0	4	Q
27	Reiko Takeda	Japan	Bardolino	4	0	4	Q
27	Ulrich Kirchhoff	Ukraine	Prince de la Mare	4	0	4	Q
27	Kevin Staut	France	Reveur de Hurtebise	4	0	4	Q
27	Matias Albarracin	Argentina	Cannavaro 9	4	0	4	Q
27	Michael Whitaker	Great Britain	Cassionato	4	0	4	Q
27	Eduardo Álvarez Aznar	Spain	Rockfeller de Pleville	4	0	4	Q
27	Martin Fuchs	Switzerland	Clooney	4	0	4	Q
27	José Maria Larocca	Argentina	Cornet du Lys	4	0	4	Q
27	Ludger Beerbaum	Germany	Casello	4	0	4	Q
27	Elizabeth Madden	United States	Cortes'c'	4	0	4	Q
27	Bassem Hassan Mohammed	Qatar	Dejavu	4	0	4	Q
50	Alonso Valdéz	Peru	Chief	4	2	6	Q
51	Ramiro Quintana	Argentina	Appy Cara	4	3	7	Q
53	Matt Williams	Australia	Valinski S	8	0	8	Q
53	Luciana Diniz	Portugal	Fit for Fun 13	8	0	8	Q
53	Hamad Al-Attiyah	Qatar	Appagino 2	8	0	8	Q
53	Malin Baryard-Johnsson	Sweden	Cue Channa	8	0	8	Q
53	René Lopez	Colombia	Con Dios III	8	0	8	Q
53	Greg Broderick	Ireland	Going Gloabal	8	0	8	Q
53	Pablo Barrios	Venezuela	Antares	8	0	8	Q
53	James Paterson-Robinson	Australia	Amarillo	8	0	8	Q
61	Ömer Karaevli	Turkey	Roso au Crosnier	12	1	13	
61	Emanuel Andrade	Venezuela	Hardrock Z	12	1	13	
63	Daniel Bluman	Colombia	Apardi	12	3	15	
64	Toshiki Masui	Japan	Taloubetdarco K Z	16	0	16	
64	Taizo Sugitani	Japan	Imothep	16	0	16	
64	Rolf-Göran Bengtsson	Sweden	Unita	16	0	16	
67	Emanuele Gaudiano	Italy	Caspar 232	24	3	27	
68	Cassio Rivetti	Ukraine	Fine Fleur du Marais	Elim.		47	
68	Bruno Passaro	Argentina	Chicago Z	Elim.		47	
68	Daisuke Fukushima	Japan	Cornet 36	Elim.		47	
68	Ferenc Szentirmai	Ukraine	Chadino	Elim.		47	
68	Isheau Wong	Chinese Taipei	Zadarijke V	Elim.		47	
68	Pénélope Leprevost	France	Flora de Mariposa	Elim.		47	
—	Nicola Philippaerts	Belgium	Zilverstar T	DSQ			Overuse of spurs
—	Jur Vrieling	Netherlands	Zirocco Blue	DSQ			Overuse of whip

==== Round 2 ====
The second qualifying round took place on 16 August and had an allowed time of 81 seconds.

Rank	Rider	Nation	Horse	Penalties				Notes
Rank	Rider	Nation	Horse	Jump	Time	Round 1	Total	Notes
1	Kent Farrington	United States	Voyeur	0	0	0	0	Q
1	Christian Ahlmann	Germany	Taloubet Z	0	0	0	0	Q
1	Peder Fredricson	Sweden	All In	0	0	0	0	Q
1	Maikel van der Vleuten	Netherlands	Verdi	0	0	0	0	Q
1	Meredith Michaels-Beerbaum	Germany	Fibonacci	0	0	0	0	Q
1	Harrie Smolders	Netherlands	Emerald	0	0	0	0	Q
1	Álvaro de Miranda Neto	Brazil	Cornetto K	0	0	0	0	Q
1	Daniel Deusser	Germany	First Class	0	0	0	0	Q
1	Sergio Alvarez Moya	Spain	Carlo 273	0	0	0	0	Q
1	Eric Lamaze	Canada	Fine Lady 5	0	0	0	0	Q
1	Pedro Veniss	Brazil	Quabri de l'Isle	0	0	0	0	Q
12	Rene Tebbel	Ukraine	Zipper	0	1	0	1	Q
12	Roger-Yves Bost	France	Sydney une Prince	0	1	0	1	Q
14	Ali Al-Rumaihi	Qatar	Gunder	0	1	1	2	Q
15	Jeroen Dubbeldam	Netherlands	Zenith	0	0	4	4	Q
15	Yann Candele	Canada	First Choice 15	0	0	4	4	Q
15	Philippe Rozier	France	Rahotep de Toscane	4	0	0	4	Q
15	Eduardo Menezes	Brazil	Quintol	0	0	4	4	Q
15	Lucy Davis	United States	Barron	0	0	4	4	Q
15	Sheikh Ali Al-Thani	Qatar	First Division	4	0	0	4	Q
15	Romain Duguet	Switzerland	Quorida de Treho	0	0	4	4	Q
15	Kevin Staut	France	Reveur de Hurtebise	0	0	4	4	Q
15	McLain Ward	United States	Azur	0	0	4	4	Q
15	Henrik von Eckermann	Sweden	Yajamila	4	0	0	4	Q
15	Martin Fuchs	Switzerland	Clooney	0	0	4	4	Q
26	Reiko Takeda	Japan	Bardolino	0	1	4	5	Q
26	Matias Albarracin	Argentina	Cannavaro 9	0	1	4	5	Q
26	Edwina Tops-Alexander	Australia	Lintea Tequila	4	1	0	5	Q
26	Amy Millar	Canada	Heros	4	1	0	5	Q
30	Luciana Diniz	Portugal	Fit for Fun 13	0	0	8	8	Q
30	Ramiro Quintana	Argentina	Appy Cara	0	1	7	8	Q
30	Matt Williams	Australia	Valinski S	0	0	8	8	Q
30	Ulrich Kirchhoff	Ukraine	Prince de la Mare	4	0	4	8	Q
30	Nick Skelton	Great Britain	Big Star	4	0	4	8	Q
30	Janika Sprunger	Switzerland	Bonne Chance CW	8	0	0	8	Q
30	Ben Maher	Great Britain	Tic Tac	4	0	4	8	Q
30	Manuel Fernandez Saro	Spain	U Watch	4	0	4	8	Q
30	Tiffany Foster	Canada	Tripple X III	4	0	4	8	Q
30	Bassem Hassan Mohammed	Qatar	Dejavu	4	0	4	8	Q
30	Steve Guerdat	Switzerland	Nino des Buissonets	8	0	0	8	Q
30	Ludger Beerbaum	Germany	Casello	4	0	4	8	Q
42	Karim El-Zoghby	Egypt	Amelia	8	1	0	9	Q
42	Michael Whitaker	Great Britain	Cassionato	4	1	4	9	Q
44	Nestor Nielsen van Hoff	Uruguay	Prince Royal Z de la Luz	8	1	1	10	Q
44	Jérôme Guery	Belgium	Gran Cru Van de Roz	8	2	0	10	Q
46	José Maria Larocca	Argentina	Cornet du Lys	8	0	4	12	
46	Pilar Lucrecia Cordon	Spain	Gribouille du Lys	8	0	4	12	
46	Malin Baryard-Johnsson	Sweden	Cue Channa	4	0	8	12	
46	Elizabeth Madden	United States	Cortes'c'	8	0	4	12	
50	Greg Broderick	Ireland	Going Gloabal	4	1	8	13	
50	Abdelkebir Ouaddar	Morocco	Quickly de Kreisker	8	1	4	13	
50	Hamad Al-Attiyah	Qatar	Appagino 2	4	1	8	13	
53	James Paterson-Robinson	Australia	Amarillo	8	1	8	17	
54	Pablo Barrios	Venezuela	Antares	12	0	8	20	
55	René Lopez	Colombia	Con Dios III	12	1	8	21	
56	Alonso Valdéz	Peru	Chief	16	0	6	22	
57	John Whitaker	Great Britain	Ornellaia	20	3	0	23	
—	Scott Keach	Australia	Fedor	Elim.		4	47	
—	Eduardo Alvarez Aznar	Spain	Rockfeller de Pleville	Elim.		4	47	
—	Stephan Barcha	Brazil	Landpeter do Feroleto	DSQ		0	DSQ	Overuse of spurs

==== Round 3 ====
The third qualifying round was run on 17 August on an allowed time of 82 seconds.

A maximum of three riders from a single country could advance to the individual final. Therefore, Ludger Beerbaum did not advance as Germany had three riders with fewer penalty points. The four riders from Switzerland had 9 penalty points each. The Swiss team leader decided not to send Janika Sprunger to the final.

Rank	Rider	Nation	Horse	Penalties				Notes
Rank	Rider	Nation	Horse	Jump	Time	Round 1+2	Total	Notes
1	Eric Lamaze	Canada	Fine Lady 5	0	0	0	0	Q
2	Kent Farrington	United States	Voyeur	0	1	0	1	Q
2	Peder Fredricson	Sweden	All In	0	1	0	1	Q
2	Maikel van der Vleuten	Netherlands	Verdi	0	1	0	1	Q
5	Roger-Yves Bost	France	Sydney une Prince	0	1	1	2	Q
6	Rene Tebbel	Ukraine	Zipper	0	2	1	3	Q
7	Ali Al-Rumaihi	Qatar	Gunder	0	2	2	4	Q
7	Christian Ahlmann	Germany	Taloubet Z	4	0	0	4	Q
7	Kevin Staut	France	Reveur de Hurtebise	0	0	4	4	Q
7	McLain Ward	United States	Azur	0	0	4	4	Q
7	Álvaro de Miranda Neto	Brazil	Cornetto K	4	0	0	4	Q
7	Daniel Deusser	Germany	First Class	4	0	0	4	Q
13	Sheikh Ali Al-Thani	Qatar	First Division	0	1	4	5	Q
13	Philippe Rozier	France	Rahotep de Toscane	0	1	4	5	Q
13	Meredith Michaels-Beerbaum	Germany	Fibonacci	4	1	0	5	Q
13	Pedro Veniss	Brazil	Quabri de l'Isle	4	1	0	5	Q
17	Sergio Alvarez Moya	Spain	Carlo 273	4	2	0	6	Q
18	Yann Candele	Canada	First Choice 15	4	0	4	8	Q
18	Eduardo Menezes	Brazil	Quintol	4	0	4	8	Q
18	Tiffany Foster	Canada	Tripple X III	0	0	8	8	Q
18	Lucy Davis	United States	Barron	4	0	4	8	Q
18	Ludger Beerbaum	Germany*	Casello	0	0	8	8	3/NOC
23	Ben Maher	Great Britain	Tic Tac	0	1	8	9	Q
23	Edwina Tops-Alexander	Australia	Lintea Tequila	4	0	5	9	Q
23	Janika Sprunger	Switzerland*	Bonne Chance CW	0	1	8	9	3/NOC
23	Jeroen Dubbeldam	Netherlands	Zenith	4	1	4	9	Q
23	Romain Duguet	Switzerland	Quorida de Treho	4	1	4	9	Q
23	Martin Fuchs	Switzerland	Clooney	4	1	4	9	Q
23	Steve Guerdat	Switzerland	Nino des Buissonets	0	1	8	9	Q
30	Matias Albarracin	Argentina	Cannavaro 9	4	1	5	10	Q
31	Henrik von Eckermann	Sweden	Yajamila	8	0	4	12	Q
31	Harrie Smolders	Netherlands	Emerald	12	0	0	12	Q
33	Luciana Diniz	Portugal	Fit for Fun 13	4	1	8	13	Q
33	Nick Skelton	Great Britain	Big Star	4	1	8	13	Q
33	Bassem Hassan Mohammed	Qatar	Dejavu	4	1	8	13	Q
36	Matt Williams	Australia	Valinski S	4	2	8	14	Q
37	Jérôme Guery	Belgium	Gran Cru Van de Roz	4	1	10	15	Q
38	Manuel Fernandez Saro	Spain	U Watch	8	1	8	17	
38	Amy Millar	Canada	Heros	12	0	5	17	
40	Karim El-Zoghby	Egypt	Amelia	8	1	9	18	
40	Ramiro Quintana	Argentina	Appy Cara	8	2	8	18	
42	Nestor Nielsen van Hoff	Uruguay	Prince Royal Z de la Luz	12	1	10	23	
43	Ulrich Kirchhoff	Ukraine	Prince de la Mare	16	1	8	25	
—	Reiko Takeda	Japan	Bardolino	DNF		5	DNF	
—	Michael Whitaker	Great Britain	Cassionato	DNS		5	DNF	

=== Final ===
==== Round A ====
Rank	Rider	Nation	Horse	Penalties			Notes
Rank	Rider	Nation	Horse	Jump	Time	Total	Notes
1	Nick Skelton	Great Britain	Big Star	0	0	0	Q
1	Edwina Tops-Alexander	Australia	Linea Tequila	0	0	0	Q
1	Jeroen Dubbeldam	Netherlands	Zenith	0	0	0	Q
1	Martin Fuchs	Switzerland	Clooney	0	0	0	Q
1	Steve Guerdat	Switzerland	Nino des Buissonets	0	0	0	Q
1	Sergio Alvarez Moya	Spain	Carlo 273	0	0	0	Q
1	Sheikh Ali Al-Thani	Qatar	First Division	0	0	0	Q
1	Christian Ahlmann	Germany	Taloubet Z	0	0	0	Q
1	Daniel Deusser	Germany	First Class	0	0	0	Q
1	Roger-Yves Bost	France	Sydney une Prince	0	0	0	Q
1	Kent Farrington	United States	Voyeur	0	0	0	Q
1	Peder Fredricson	Sweden	All In	0	0	0	Q
1	Eric Lamaze	Canada	Fine Lady 5	0	0	0	Q
14	Matias Albarracin	Argentina	Cannavaro 9	0	1	1	Q
14	Rene Tebbel	Ukraine	Zipper	0	1	1	Q
16	Luciana Diniz	Portugal	Fit for Fun 13	4	0	4	Q
16	Henrik von Eckermann	Sweden	Yajamila	4	0	4	Q
16	Harrie Smolders	Netherlands	Emerald	4	0	4	Q
16	Ben Maher	Great Britain	Tic Tac	4	0	4	Q
16	Tiffany Foster	Canada	Tripple X III	4	0	4	Q
16	Philippe Rozier	France	Rahotep de Toscane	4	0	4	Q
16	Pedro Veniss	Brazil	Quabri de l'Isle	4	0	4	Q
16	Ali Al-Rumaihi	Qatar	Gunder	4	0	4	Q
16	Kevin Staut	France	Reveur de Hurtebise	4	0	4	Q
16	McLain Ward	United States	Azur	4	0	4	Q
16	Álvaro de Miranda Neto	Brazil	Cornetto K	4	0	4	Q
16	Maikel van der Vleuten	Netherlands	Verdi	4	0	4	Q
28	Jérôme Guéry	Belgium	Gran Cru Van de Roz	8	0	8	
28	Matt Williams	Australia	Valinski S	8	0	8	
28	Bassem Hassan Mohammed	Qatar	Dejavu	8	0	8	
28	Eduardo Menezes	Brazil	Quintol	8	0	8	
32	Romain Duguet	Switzerland	Quorida de Treho	12	0	12	
32	Yann Candele	Canada	First Choice 15	12	0	12	
32	Lucy Davis	United States	Barron	12	0	12	
—	Meredith Michaels-Beerbaum	Germany	Fibonacci	DNF			

==== Round B ====
Rank	Rider	Nation	Horse	Penalties				Notes
Rank	Rider	Nation	Horse	Jump	Time	Round A	Total	Notes
1	Nick Skelton	Great Britain	Big Star	0	0	0	0	Q
1	Steve Guerdat	Switzerland	Nino des Buissonets	0	0	0	0	Q
1	Sheikh Ali Al-Thani	Qatar	First Division	0	0	0	0	Q
1	Kent Farrington	United States	Voyeur	0	0	0	0	Q
1	Peder Fredricson	Sweden	All In	0	0	0	0	Q
1	Eric Lamaze	Canada	Fine Lady 5	0	0	0	0	Q
7	Jeroen Dubbeldam	Netherlands	Zenith	0	1	0	1	
8	Matias Albarracin	Argentina	Cannavaro 9	0	1	1	2	
9	Luciana Diniz	Portugal	Fit for Fun 13	0	0	4	4	
9	McLain Ward	United States	Azur	0	0	4	4	
9	Álvaro de Miranda Neto	Brazil	Cornetto K	0	0	4	4	
9	Edwina Tops-Alexander	Australia	Linea Tequila	4	0	0	4	
9	Martin Fuchs	Switzerland	Clooney	4	0	0	4	
9	Christian Ahlmann	Germany	Taloubet Z	4	0	0	4	
9	Daniel Deusser	Germany	First Class	4	0	0	4	
16	Pedro Veniss	Brazil	Quabri de l'Isle	0	1	4	5	
16	Ali Al-Rumaihi	Qatar	Gunder	0	1	4	5	
16	Roger-Yves Bost	France	Sydney une Prince	4	1	0	5	
19	Rene Tebbel	Ukraine	Zipper	4	1	1	6	
20	Maikel van der Vleuten	Netherlands	Verdi	4	1	4	9	
20	Sergio Alvarez Moya	Spain	Carlo 273	8	1	0	9	
22	Kevin Staut	France	Reveur de Hurtebise	8	0	4	12	
23	Philippe Rozier	France	Rahotep de Toscane	8	1	4	13	
24	Henrik von Eckermann	Sweden	Yajamila	12	0	4	16	
25	Ben Maher	Great Britain	Tic Tac	12	1	4	17	
26	Tiffany Foster	Canada	Tripple X III	16	1	4	21	
—	Harrie Smolders	Netherlands	Emerald	DNS		4	DNF	

==== Jump-off ====
Rank	Rider	Nation	Horse	Penalties	Time (s)
1st place, gold medalist(s)	Nick Skelton	Great Britain	Big Star	0	42.82
2nd place, silver medalist(s)	Peder Fredricson	Sweden	All In	0	43.35
3rd place, bronze medalist(s)	Eric Lamaze	Canada	Fine Lady 5	4	42.09
4	Steve Guerdat	Switzerland	Nino des Buissonets	4	43.08
5	Kent Farrington	United States	Voyeur	8	42.23
6	Sheikh Ali Al-Thani	Qatar	First Division	8	45.03
