= Uruguay at the 2016 Summer Olympics =

- IOC code: URU
- NOC: Uruguayan Olympic Committee
- Website: www.cou.org.uy (in Spanish)

in Rio de Janeiro
- Competitors: 17 in 8 sports
- Flag bearer: Dolores Moreira
- Medals: Gold 0 Silver 0 Bronze 0 Total 0

Summer Olympics appearances (overview)
- 1924; 1928; 1932; 1936; 1948; 1952; 1956; 1960; 1964; 1968; 1972; 1976; 1980; 1984; 1988; 1992; 1996; 2000; 2004; 2008; 2012; 2016; 2020; 2024

Uruguay competed at the 2016 Summer Olympics in Rio de Janeiro, Brazil from 5 to 21 August 2016. Since the nation's official debut in 1920, Uruguayan athletes have appeared in every edition of the Summer Olympic Games, with the exception of the 1980 Summer Olympics in Moscow, because of its partial support to the United States-led boycott.

The Uruguayan Olympic Committee (Spanish: Comité Olímpico Uruguayo, COU) confirmed a team of 17 athletes, 12 men and 5 women, to compete in eight sports at the Games. It was the nation's largest delegation sent to the Olympics since 1968, without any association to the team-based sports. There was only a single competitor in judo, rowing, tennis, weightlifting, and equestrian.

Four athletes on the Uruguayan roster previously competed at London 2012, with two of them headed to their fourth Games: hurdler Andrés Silva and sailing legend Alejandro Foglia, who finished among the top eight in the Laser class before moving to Finn. Foglia was joined by his older sister Mariana, who sailed alongside her husband Pablo Defazio in the Nacra 17 category. Other notable Uruguayan athletes included marathon twins Martín and Nicolás Cuestas, world no. 40 tennis player Pablo Cuevas, and 17-year-old Laser Radial sailor Dolores Moreira, who was selected to carry the nation's flag at the opening ceremony.

Uruguay, however, did not win any Olympic medals in Rio de Janeiro. The nation's last medal happened at the 2000 Summer Olympics in Sydney, where track cyclist Milton Wynants bagged a silver in the points race (currently replaced by Omnium). Unable to end the nation's 16-year podium drought, long jumper Emiliano Lasa delivered the most successful outcome for the Uruguayans at the Games, placing sixth in the men's long jump final.

== Athletics (track and field) ==
Uruguayan athletes have so far achieved qualifying standards in the following athletics events (up to a maximum of 3 athletes in each event):

Key

- Note–Ranks given for track events are within the athlete's heat only
- Q = Qualified for the next round
- q = Qualified for the next round as a fastest loser or, in field events, by position without achieving the qualifying target
- NR = National record
- N/A = Round not applicable for the event
- Bye = Athlete not required to compete in round
- NM = No mark

Track & road events

Athlete	Event	Heat		Semifinal		Final	
Athlete	Event	Result	Rank	Result	Rank	Result	Rank
Andrés Silva	Men's 400 m hurdles	49.21	3 Q	49.75	6	Did not advance	
Martín Cuestas	Men's marathon	—N/a				2:28:10	110
Nicolás Cuestas	Men's marathon	—N/a				2:17:44	40
Andrés Zamora	Men's marathon	—N/a				2:18:36	50
Déborah Rodríguez	Women's 800 m	2:01.86	6	Did not advance			

Field events

Athlete	Event	Qualification		Final	
Athlete	Event	Distance	Position	Distance	Position
Emiliano Lasa	Men's long jump	8.14	3 q	8.10	6

== Equestrian ==
Uruguay has entered one jumping rider into the Olympic jumping competition by virtue of a top six individual finish at the 2015 Pan American Games, signifying the nation's Olympic show jumping comeback for the first time in 56 years.

=== Jumping ===
Athlete	Horse	Event	Qualification								Final					Total	
Athlete	Horse	Event	Round 1		Round 2			Round 3			Round A		Round B			Total	
Athlete	Horse	Event	Penalties	Rank	Penalties	Total	Rank	Penalties	Total	Rank	Penalties	Rank	Penalties	Total	Rank	Penalties	Rank
Nestor Nielsen van Hoff	Prince Royal de la Luz	Individual	1	=25 Q	9	10	=44 Q	13	23	42	Did not advance						

== Judo ==
Uruguay has qualified one judoka for the men's half-heavyweight category (100 kg) at the Games. Pablo Aprahamian earned a continental quota spot from the Pan American region, as Uruguay's top-ranked judoka outside of direct qualifying position in the IJF World Ranking List of May 30, 2016.

Athlete	Event	Round of 64	Round of 32	Round of 16	Quarterfinals	Semifinals	Repechage	Final / BM	
Athlete	Event	Opposition Result	Opposition Result	Opposition Result	Opposition Result	Opposition Result	Opposition Result	Opposition Result	Rank
Pablo Aprahamian	Men's −100 kg	Bye	Buzacarini (BRA); L 000–100	Did not advance					

== Rowing ==
Uruguay has qualified one boat in the men's single sculls at the 2016 Latin American Continental Qualification Regatta in Valparaíso, Chile.

Athlete	Event	Heats		Repechage		Quarterfinals		Semifinals		Final	
Athlete	Event	Time	Rank	Time	Rank	Time	Rank	Time	Rank	Time	Rank
Jhonatan Esquivel	Men's single sculls	7:16.08	3 QF	Bye		7:40.27	5 SC/D	7:22.98	1 FC	7:13.65	18

Qualification Legend: FA=Final A (medal); FB=Final B (non-medal); FC=Final C (non-medal); FD=Final D (non-medal); FE=Final E (non-medal); FF=Final F (non-medal); SA/B=Semifinals A/B; SC/D=Semifinals C/D; SE/F=Semifinals E/F; QF=Quarterfinals; R=Repechage

== Sailing ==
Uruguayan sailors have qualified one boat in each of the following classes through the individual fleet World Championships, and South American qualifying regattas.

Athlete	Event	Race													Net points	Final rank
Athlete	Event	1	2	3	4	5	6	7	8	9	10	11	12	M*	Net points	Final rank
Alejandro Foglia	Men's Finn	21	~~UFD~~	9	17	20	21	15	15	3	1	—N/a		EL	122	19
Dolores Moreira	Women's Laser Radial	12	~~32~~	23	22	31	28	28	7	11	24	—N/a		EL	185	25
Pablo Defazio; Mariana Foglia	Mixed Nacra 17	~~19~~	5	11	13	17	19	16	16	17	6	6	16	EL	142	17

M = Medal race; EL = Eliminated – did not advance into the medal race

== Swimming ==
Uruguay has received a Universality invitation from FINA to send two swimmers (one male and one female) to the Olympics.

Athlete	Event	Heat		Semifinal		Final	
Athlete	Event	Time	Rank	Time	Rank	Time	Rank
Martín Melconian	Men's 100 m breaststroke	1:02.67	39	Did not advance			
Inés Remersaro	Women's 100 m freestyle	57.85 NR	34	Did not advance			

== Tennis ==
Uruguay has entered one tennis player into the Olympic tournament, signifying the nation's comeback to the sport since 1996. Pablo Cuevas (world no. 40) qualified directly for the men's singles as one of the top 56 eligible players in the ATP World Rankings as of June 6, 2016.

Athlete	Event	Round of 64	Round of 32	Round of 16	Quarterfinals	Semifinals	Final / BM	
Athlete	Event	Opposition Score	Opposition Score	Opposition Score	Opposition Score	Opposition Score	Opposition Score	Rank
Pablo Cuevas	Men's singles	Basilashvili (GEO); W 6–3, 6–7^{(8–10)}, 6–3	Bellucci (BRA); L 2–6, 6–4, 3–6	Did not advance				

== Weightlifting ==
Uruguay has received an unused quota place from IWF to send a female weightlifter to the Olympics, signifying the nation's Olympic return to the sport for the first time since 1996.

Athlete	Event	Snatch		Clean & Jerk		Total	Rank
Athlete	Event	Result	Rank	Result	Rank	Total	Rank
Sofía Rito	Women's −53 kg	64	13	82	12	146	12

== See also ==
- Uruguay at the 2015 Pan American Games
- Uruguay at the 2016 Summer Paralympics
