= Bruno Passaro =

Argentine equestrian

Personal information
- Born: 10 February 1989 (age 36)

Bruno Passaro (born 10 February 1989) is an Argentine Olympic show jumping rider. He competed at the 2016 Summer Olympics in Rio de Janeiro, Brazil, where he finished 10th in the team and was eliminated in the individual competition.
