= Pilar Lucrecia Cordón =

Spanish equestrian

Personal information
- Full name: Pilar Lucrecia Cordón
- Nationality: Spain
- Discipline: Jumping
- Born: 4 March 1973 (age 52)
- Height: 1.75 m (5 ft 9 in)
- Weight: 58 kg (128 lb)

Pilar Lucrecia Cordón Muro (born 4 March 1973) is a Spanish Olympic show jumping rider. She competed at the 2016 Summer Olympics in Rio de Janeiro, Brazil, where she placed 11th in the team and 46th in the individual competition.
