= Stephan Barcha =

Brazilian equestrian (born 1989)

Personal information
- Full name: Stephan de Freitas Barcha
- Discipline: Show jumping
- Born: 27 October 1989 (age 37); Rio de Janeiro, Brazil
- Height: 171 cm (5 ft 7 in)
Medal record
Equestrian
Representing Brazil
Pan American Games
Gold medal – first place	2023 Santiago	Individual jumping
Bronze medal – third place	2023 Santiago	Team jumping
South American Games
Gold medal – first place	2022 Asuncion	Team jumping
Gold medal – first place	2026 Santa Fe	Team jumping
Silver medal – second place	2022 Asuncion	Individual jumping

Stephan de Freitas Barcha (born 27 October 1989) is a Brazilian Olympic show jumping rider. He competed at the 2016 Summer Olympics in Rio de Janeiro, Brazil, where he finished 5th in the team and 60th in the individual competition
