= Henrik von Eckermann =

Swedish equestrian

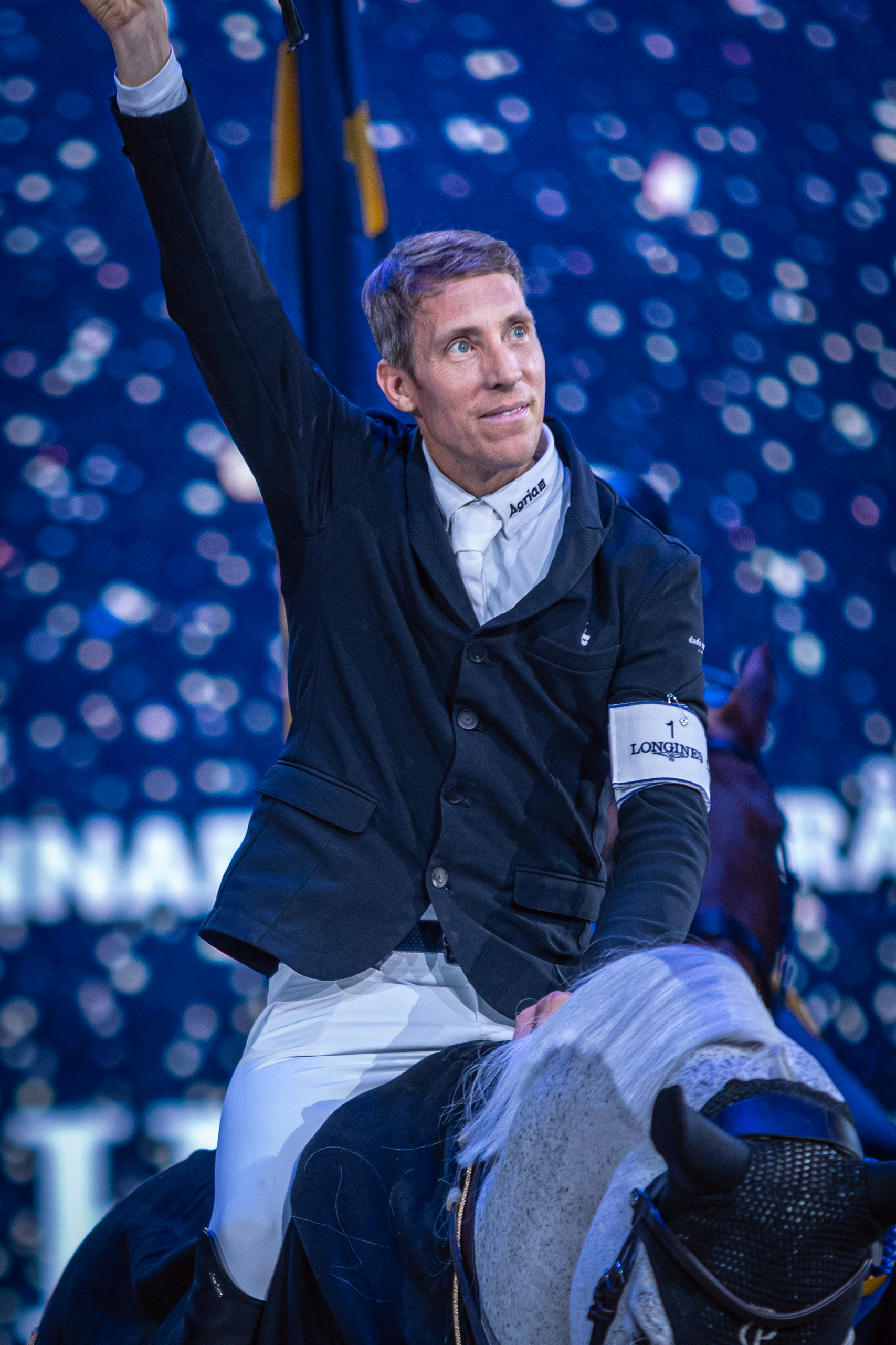
- Eckermann in 2024

Personal information
- Full name: Henrik von Eckermann
- Nationality: Sweden
- Discipline: Jumping
- Born: 25 May 1981 (age 45); Nyköping, Sweden
- Height: 1.86 m (6 ft 1 in)
- Weight: 66 kg (146 lb)
Medal record
Equestrian
Representing Sweden
Olympic Games
Gold medal – first place	2020 Tokyo	Team jumping
World Championships
Gold medal – first place	2022 Herning	Individual jumping
Gold medal – first place	2022 Herning	Team jumping
Silver medal – second place	2018 Tryon	Team jumping
European Championships
Gold medal – first place	2023 Milan	Team jumping
Silver medal – second place	2017 Gothenburg	Team jumping
Bronze medal – third place	2013 Herning	Team jumping
World Cup
Gold medal – first place	2023 Omaha	Individual jumping
Gold medal – first place	2024 Riyadh	Individual jumping
Bronze medal – third place	2017 Omaha	Individual jumping
Bronze medal – third place	2018 Paris	Individual jumping

Henrik von Eckermann (born 25 May 1981) is a Swedish Olympic show jumping rider. He has competed at four Summer Olympics (in 2012, 2016, 2020 and 2024). His best individual Olympic placements came in the 2020 Olympics in Tokyo when he won gold in the team and placed 4th in the individual competition.

== Career ==
Von Eckermann participated at the 2014 World Equestrian Games and at four European Show Jumping Championships (in 2009, 2011, 2013, and 2015). He won a team bronze at the 2013 Europeans held in Herning, Denmark. Meanwhile, his current best individual result is 5th place from the 2011 European Championships. Henrik also participated at three editions of the Show Jumping World Cup finals (in 2013, 2016, and 2017). His biggest success came in 2017, when he placed 3rd in the finals, behind McLain Ward and Romain Duguet.

== Personal life ==
Von Eckermann is descended from the von Eckermann family, a Swedish unintroduced noble family, ennobled in Russia and originally from Mecklenburg.

He married Swiss showjumper Janika Sprunger in 2022. Together they have a son born in 2021. They own stables in Kessel, Netherlands. Von Eckermann was previously based near Bonn, Germany.

He is related to the Swedish women's rights activist Ebba von Eckermann (1866–1960).

== Major results ==
=== Olympic Games ===
- London 2012 – 6th in team competition, 23rd individually (with Allerdings)
- Rio 2016 – 7th in team competition, 24th individually (with Yajamila)
- Tokyo 2020 – 1st in team competition, 4th individually (with King Edward)
- Paris 2024 – 6th in team competition (with King Edward).

=== World Equestrian Games / World Championships ===
- 2014, Caen – 6th in team competition, 38th individually (with Gotha FRH)
- 2018, Mill Spring – 2nd in team competition (with Mary Lou)
- 2022, Herning – 1st in both team competition and individually (with King Edward)

=== European Championships ===
- 2001, Gijón (Young Riders) – 18th individually (with Chess)
- 2002, Copenhagen (Young Riders) – 2nd in team competition, 25th individually (with Chess)
- 2009, Windsor – 8th in team competition, 46th individually (with Montender)
- 2011, Madrid – 5th in both team competition and individually (with Coupe de Coeur)
- 2013, Herning – 3rd in team competition, 27th individually (with Gotha FRH)
- 2015, Aachen – 9th in team competition, 19th individually (with Gotha FRH)
- 2017, Gothenburg – 2nd in team competition (with Mary Lou)
