= Karim El-Zoghby =

Egyptian equestrian

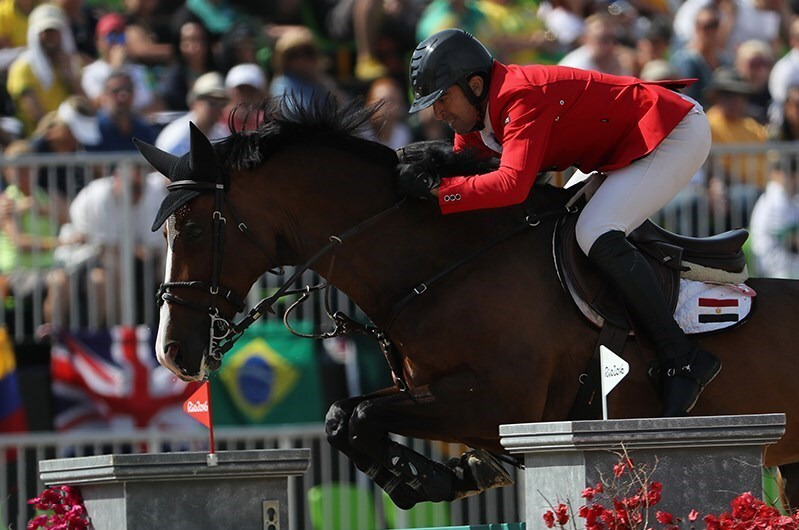
- Karim El-Zoghby riding Amelia at the 2016 Olympics

Personal information
- Born: February 15, 1977 (age 49)
Medal record
Equestrian
Representing Egypt
Pan Arab Games
Silver medal – second place	2007 Cairo	Team jumping
Silver medal – second place	2007 Cairo	Individual jumping

Karim El-Zoghby (born 15 February 1977) is an Egyptian Olympic show jumping rider. He competed at three Summer Olympics (in 2008, 2012 and 2016).His best Olympic result came in 2016 when he placed 40th in the individual competition with the horse Amelia.

El-Zoghby participated at four World Equestrian Games (in 2002, 2006, 2010 and 2014). He finished 21st in the team competition in 2014, while his best individual placement is 56th place from 2010. El-Zoghny also participated at several regional games, including the 2007 Pan Arab Games where he won team and individual silvers.
