= René Tebbel =

German equestrian

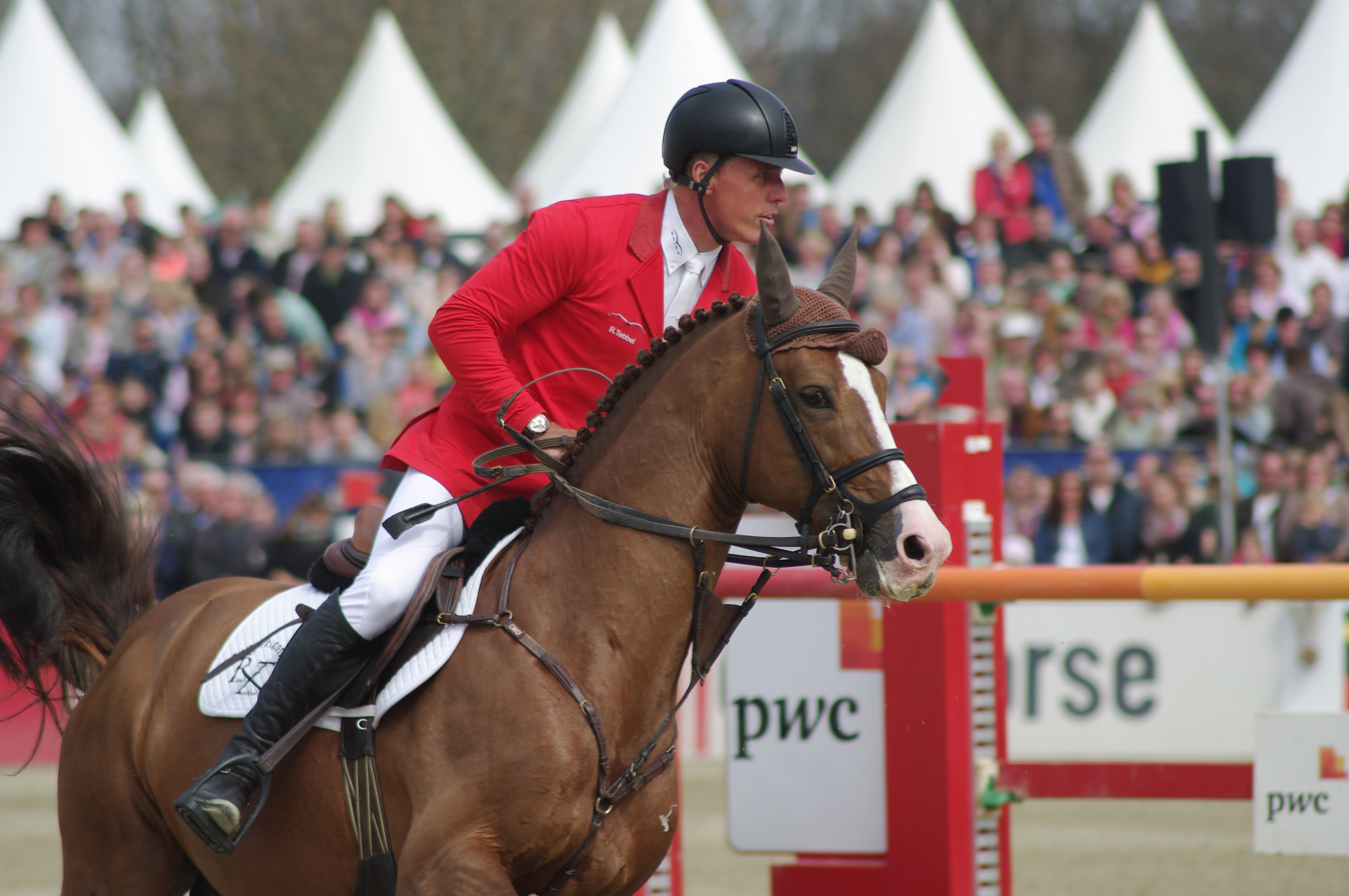
- Rene Tebbel in 2013.

Personal information
- Born: 12 February 1969 (age 57)
Medal record
Equestrian
Representing Germany
World Equestrian Games
Silver medal – second place	1990 Stockholm	Team jumping

René Tebbel (born 12 February 1969) is a German-born show jumping rider who has been representing Ukraine since 2015. He competed at the 2016 Summer Olympics in Rio de Janeiro where he finished 19th in the individual and 13th in the team competition.

Representing Germany, he competed at the 1990 World Equestrian Games, 1993 European Championships and at seven editions of FEI Show Jumping World Cup finals (in 1990, 1993, 1998, 1999, 2001, 2002 and 2007). After switching allegiances to Ukraine he also participated at the 2015 European Championships.
