= Reiko Takeda =

Japanese equestrian

Personal information
- Born: 14 December 1984 (age 41) Kobe, Japan

Reiko Takeda (武田 麗子, Takeda Reiko; born 14 December 1984 in Kobe, Hyogo, Japan) is a Japanese Olympic show jumping rider. Representing Japan, she competed at two Summer Olympics (in 2012 and 2016). Her best Olympic results came in 2016, when she placed 13th in the team competition and 44th in the individual portion.

Takeda also competed at the 2010 Asian Games in Guangzhou, China.

Reiko Takeda is the daughter of Kunio Takeda, chairman of Takeda pharmaceutical company.
