= Peder Fredricson =

Swedish equestrian (born 1972)

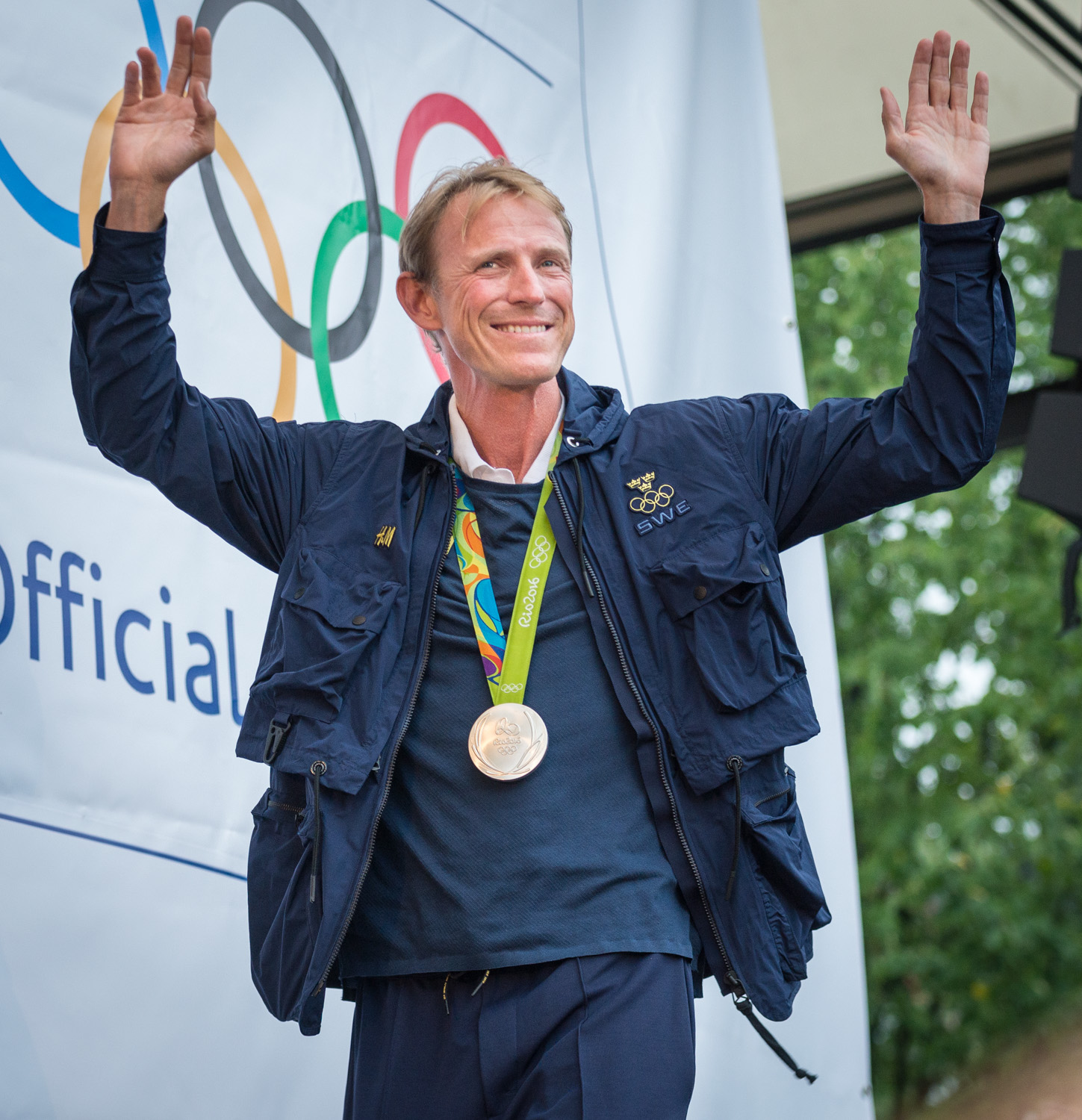
- Peder Fredricson in Kungsträdgården in Stockholm, Sweden during celebrations of the Swedish athletes returning from the 2016 Olympic Summer Games in Rio de Janeiro, Brazil

Personal information
- Full name: Carl Peder Fredricson
- Born: 30 January 1972 (age 54) Flen, Sweden
- Height: 189 cm (6 ft 2 in)

Sport
- Country: Sweden
- Sport: Equestrian
- Event: Show jumping
Medal record
Olympic Games
Gold medal – first place	2020 Tokyo	Team jumping
Silver medal – second place	2004 Athens	Team jumping
Silver medal – second place	2016 Rio de Janeiro	Individual jumping
Silver medal – second place	2020 Tokyo	Individual jumping
World Championships
Gold medal – first place	2022 Herning	Team jumping
Silver medal – second place	2018 Tryon	Team jumping
European Championships
Gold medal – first place	2017 Gothenburg	Individual jumping
Silver medal – second place	2017 Gothenburg	Team jumping
Bronze medal – third place	2021 Riesenbeck	Individual jumping
World Cup
Bronze medal – third place	2019 Gothenburg	Individual jumping
Bronze medal – third place	2024 Riyadh	Individual jumping

Carl Peder Fredricson (born 30 January 1972) is a Swedish equestrian and Olympic medalist. He was born in Flen in Södermanland. He has won one Olympic gold medal in team jumping at the 2020 Summer Olympics in Tokyo, and three Olympic silver medals, his first in team jumping at the 2004 Summer Olympics in Athens, his second in individual jumping at the 2016 Summer Olympics in Rio de Janeiro, and his third in Individual jumping at the 2020 Summer Olympics in Tokyo. He also participated at the 1992 Summer Olympics in Barcelona, in eventing. In the 2021 Tokyo Olympic Games, Peder Fredricson with his horse H&M All In won team gold medal with Malin Baryard-Johnsson and Henrik von Eckermann and also a silver medal as individual. Among his top horses, there are H&M Christian K, H&M All In, Catch me Not S, Jumper d’Oase and Thelma Hästak.

In 2016 and 2017 Fredricson won the Jerring Award.
