= Alonso Valdéz =

Peruvian equestrian

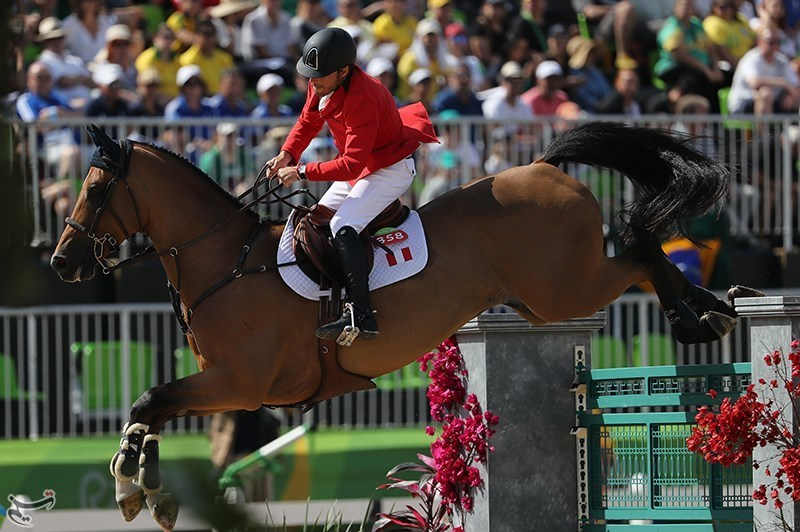
- Alonso Valdez riding Chief at the 2016 Olympics

Personal information
- Born: January 23, 1978 (age 48)
- Height: 1.70 m (5 ft 7 in)
- Weight: 68 kg (150 lb)
Medal record
Equestrian
Representing Peru
Bolivarian Games
Bronze medal – third place	2013 Trujillo	Team jumping

Alonso Napoleon Valdéz Prado (born 23 January 1978) is a Peruvian Olympic show jumping rider. He competed at the 2016 Summer Olympics in Rio de Janeiro, Brazil, where he finished 56th in the individual competition, collecting 22 penalties in total during the first two qualification rounds. Alonso became the first Peruvian equestrian to compete at the Olympics since 1984, and the first one to compete in show jumping.

Valdez participated at the 2014 World Equestrian Games, where he placed 97th individually. He also participated at several regional games, including the 2015 Pan American Games.
