= Fine Lady 5 =

- Breed: Hanoverian
- Discipline: Show jumping
- Sex: Mare
- Color: Bay
- Owner: Artisan Farms & Torrey Pines Stable
- Trainer: Eric Lamaze

Major wins
- Individual bronze medal in show jumping, 2016 Summer Olympics

Fine Lady 5 is a Hanoverian horse ridden in show jumping by Canadian Eric Lamaze. Riding Fine Lady 5, Lamaze won an individual bronze medal in the 2016 Summer Olympics.

== Life and career ==
Fine Lady 5 is a bay Hanoverian mare, owned by Artisan Farms and Torrey Pines Stable. She is ridden in show jumping competitions by Eric Lamaze of Canada.

In June 2016, Lamaze and Fine Lady 5 placed second in the Spruce Meadows Grand Prix in Alberta, Canada. They were part of the Canadian equestrian contingent at the 2016 Summer Olympics in Rio de Janeiro, Brazil. While the Canadian team finished in fourth place, Lamaze and Fine Lady 5 had a clear round in the finals of the individual jumping competition. They and 5 other horses and riders advanced to a jump-off for the medals. Fine Lady 5 knocked down the seventh jump on the course, but had a final time of 42.09 seconds. She and Lamaze took the individual bronze medal.

On December 10, 2021, Fine Lady 5 was officially retired in a special ceremony held during the Rolex IJRC Top 10 Final at CHI Geneva, Switzerland.
