= Matias Albarracin =

Argentine equestrian

Matías Albarracín
Personal information
- Born: 25 October 1979 (age 46) Curitiba, Brazil
Medal record
Equestrian
Representing Argentina
Pan American Games
Silver medal – second place	2015 Toronto	Team jumping

Matías Albarracín (born 25 October 1979) is an Argentine Olympic show jumping rider. He competed at the 2016 Summer Olympics in Rio de Janeiro where he finished 8th in the individual and 10th in the team competition.

Albarracin also participated at four Pan American Games (in 2007, 2011, 2015 and 2019). His biggest success came in 2015 when he won a team silver.

He competed at the 2020 Summer Olympics.
