= Ramiro Quintana =

Argentine equestrian

Personal information
- Born: March 7, 1977 (age 49)
Medal record
Equestrian
Representing Argentina
Pan American Games
Silver medal – second place	2015 Toronto	Team jumping

Ramiro Quintana (born 7 March 1977) is an Argentine Olympic show jumping rider. He competed at the 2016 Summer Olympics in Rio de Janeiro, Brazil, where he finished 40th in the individual and 10th in the team competition and participated at the 2015 Pan American Games, where he won a team silver and placed 39th individually.

== Personal life ==
In December 2013, Ramiro Quintana became a father when his then-girlfriend Georgina Bloomberg gave birth to a son, Jasper Michael Brown Quintana. He is not involved in the day-to-day raising of his son.
