= Janika Sprunger =

Swiss equestrian

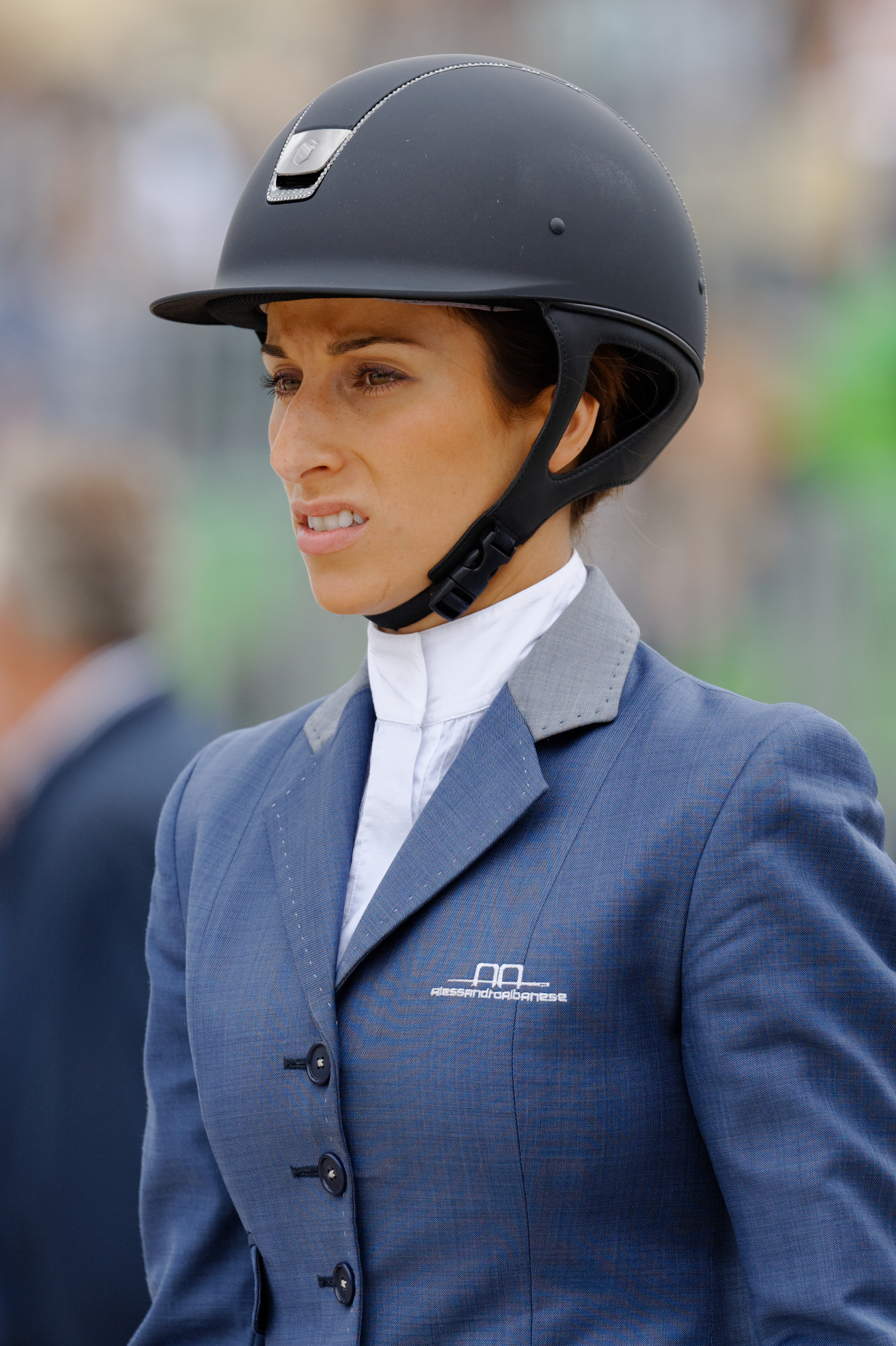
- Sprunger at the 2014 Paris Eiffel Jumping

Personal information
- Born: 29 May 1987 (age 39)
Medal record
Equestrian
Representing Switzerland
European Championships
Bronze medal – third place	2015 Aachen	Team jumping

Janika Sprunger (born 29 May 1987) is a Swiss Olympic show jumping rider. She competed at the 2016 Summer Olympics in Rio de Janeiro, Brazil, where she finished 6th in the Team and 37th in the individual competition.

Sprunger also participated at the European Show Jumping Championships (in 2013 and 2015). She won a team bronze medal at the 2015 Europeans in Aachen, Germany. Meanwhile, her current best individual placement is 7th place since 2013.
