= Beth Underhill =

Canadian equestrian

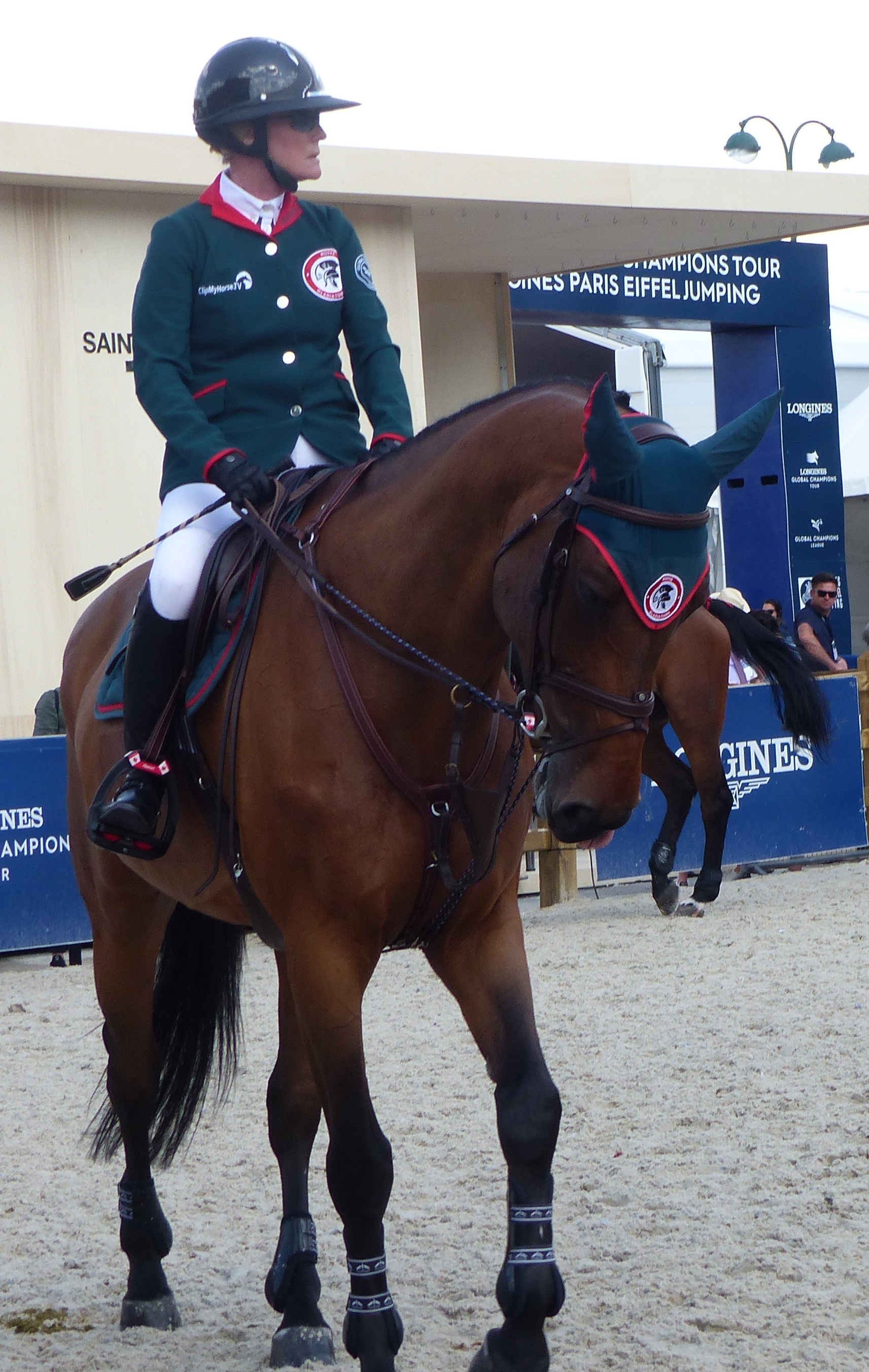
- Beth Underhill at Paris Eiffel Jumping 2023

Personal information
- Full name: Elizabeth Jane Underhill
- Nationality: Canada
- Discipline: Show jumping
- Born: 5 September 1962 (age 63); Georgetown, Ontario, Canada
Medal record
Equestrian
Representing Canada
Pan American Games
Silver medal – second place	1991 Havana	Individual jumping
Silver medal – second place	1991 Havana	Team jumping
Silver medal – second place	2023 Santiago	Team jumping
Bronze medal – third place	1999 Winnipeg	Team jumping

Elizabeth Jane "Beth" Underhill (born 5 September 1962) is a Canadian Equestrian Team athlete for show jumping. She owns and operates Beth Underhill Stables at Kingsgate in the community of Schomberg in King Township, Ontario. She was a commentator for the Canadian Broadcasting Corporation during its coverage of the equestrian events at the 2008 Summer Olympics in Beijing.

== Early life ==
Underhill was born to Jack and Joan Underhill in Georgetown, a community in Halton Hills. Her father died of a heart attack in 1980. In 2000, 20 years to the day of her father's death, her mother committed suicide.

She started riding at a YMCA camp in Georgetown. In 1969, she was enrolled in the Toronto-North York Pony Club. One year during her youth, she skipped school with a friend to attend the Royal Agricultural Winter Fair, where she "took some straw from Branch County's stall as a souvenir" that she still possesses.

She was enrolled in a music program at the Royal Conservatory of Music (RCM), where she sang and played piano. The RCM awarded her a silver medal for best Canadian vocalist in 1977. She discontinued the program later that year to focus on equestrianism, but has said that her music training led her to have a "much more confident, stronger attitude, not just in riding but in life as well".

== Equestrian career ==
Underhill was added to the Canadian Equestrian Team in 1990, during which time she worked for and trained with Terrance 'Torchy' Millar. She made her debut appearance with the national team at the FEI Nations Cup in Washington, D.C. riding Monopoly. She described wearing team Canada's red jacket for the first time as the "most thrilling moment" of her career. In 1993, she became the first woman to win the Canadian World Cup qualifying league. She won it again in 1999.

She was part of the national jumping team at the 1998 FEI World Equestrian Games that finished in 10th place. She was in 81st place in individual show jumping at the 1992 Summer Olympics.

She was offered $1 million for her horse Altair, an offer she declined. In 2001, Altair damaged a suspensory tendon at an event at Spruce Meadows. Underhill has stated that Altair and Monopoly received fan mail.

At the Royal Agricultural Winter Fair in 2011, she was thrown from her horse Viggo and suffered a concussion, the second of her career but the first resulting in memory loss.

In 1987, she established Beth Underhill Stables, now operated by five full-time employees on a 100 acres (40 ha) property in Schomberg. It has a barn for 20 horses, each with a 12-by-12-foot (3.7 m × 3.7 m) stall. The facility provides training for riders and horses.
