= Equestrian events at the 2023 Pan American Games =

- Equestrian pictograms
- Venue: Escuela de equitación regimiento granaderos
- Start date: October 22, 2023
- End date: November 3, 2023
- No. of events: 6 (6 open)
- Competitors: 150 from 25 nations

Equestrian competitions at the 2023 Pan American Games are scheduled to be held from October 22 to November 3. The venue for the competition is the Escuela de equitación regimiento granaderos in Quillota, Chile.

A total of 150 athletes are scheduled to compete in the three disciplines of dressage, eventing and jumping, each with an individual and team event.

All three disciplines will serve as qualifiers for the 2024 Summer Olympics in Paris, France.

== Qualification ==
A quota of up to 150 equestrian riders (44 dressage, 46 eventing and 60 show jumping) will be allowed to qualify. A maximum of 12 athletes can compete for a nation across all events (with a maximum of four per discipline). Athletes qualified through various qualifying events and rankings.

== Participating nations ==
A total of 19 countries qualified equestrians. The numbers in parentheses represents the number of participants qualified.

- Argentina (12)
- Barbados (2)
- Bolivia (2)
- Brazil (12)
- Canada (12)
- Chile (12)
- Colombia (12)
- Dominican Republic (6)
- Ecuador (10)
- El Salvador (1)
- Independent Athletes Team (7)
- Mexico (12)
- Panama (2)
- Paraguay (2)
- Peru (4)
- Puerto Rico (6)
- Uruguay (10)
- United States (12)
- Venezuela (5)

== Medal summary ==
=== Medal table ===
* Host nation (Chile)

Rank	Nation	Gold	Silver	Bronze	Total
1	United States	3	2	2	7
2	Brazil	1	3	2	6
3	Canada	1	1	2	4
4	Ecuador	1	0	0	1
Totals (4 entries)		6	6	6	18

=== Medalists ===
Event	Gold	Silver	Bronze
Individual dressage	Julio Mendoza Loor on Jewel's Goldstrike; Ecuador	João Victor Marcari Oliva on Feel Good VO; Brazil	Anna Marek on Fire Fly; United States
Team dressage	United States; Codi Harrison on Katholt's Bossco; Anna Marek on Fire Fly; Christian Simonson on Son of A Lady; Sarah Tubman on First Apple	Brazil; Manuel Tavares de Almeida on Rosa Belle; João Victor Marcari Oliva on Feel Good VO; Paulo César dos Santos on Fidel da Sasa JE; Renderson Oliveira on Fogoso Campline	Canada; Beatrice Boucher on Summerwood's Limei; Camille Carier Bergeron on Sound of Silence 4 Naïma Moreira-Laliberté on Statesman; Mathilde Tétreault on Fedor
Individual eventing	Caroline Pamukcu on HSH Blake; United States	Márcio Jorge on Castle Howard Casanova; Brazil	Lindsay Traisnel on Bacyrouge; Canada
Team eventing	Canada; Lindsay Traisnel on Bacyrouge; Karl Slezak on Hot Bobo; Michael Winter on El Mundo; Colleen Loach on Fe Golden Eye	United States; Caroline Pamukcu on HSH Blake; Liz Halliday on Miks Master C Sydney Elliott on Qc Diamantaire; Sharon White on Claus 63	Brazil; Márcio Jorge on Castle Howard Casanova; Rafael Losano on Withington; Carlos Parro on Safira; Ruy Fonseca on Ballypatrick SRS
Individual jumping	Stephan Barcha on Chevaux Primavera Imperio Egipcio; Brazil	Kent Farrington on Landon; United States	McLain Ward on Contagious; United States
Team jumping	United States; McLain Ward on Contagious; Laura Kraut on Dorado 212; Kent Farrington on Landon; Karl Cook on Caracole de La Roque	Canada; Tiffany Foster on Figor; Amy Millar on Truman; Beth Underhill on Nikka Vd Bisschop; Mario Deslauriers on Emerson	Brazil; Stephan Barcha on Chevaux Primavera Imperio Egipcio; Pedro Veniss on Nimrod de Muse Z Rodrigo Pessoa on Major Tom; Marlon Zanotelli on Deesse de Coquerie

== See also ==
- Equestrian events at the 2024 Summer Olympics
