= Juan Andrés Rodríguez (equestrian) =

Guatemalan equestrian

Personal information
- Full name: Juan Andrés Rodríguez Silva
- Nationality: Guatemala
- Born: 27 September 1971 (age 54)
- Height: 1.83 m (6 ft 0 in)
- Weight: 70 kg (154 lb)

Sport
- Sport: Equestrianism
Medal record
Equestrian
Representing Guatemala
Central American and Caribbean Games
Silver medal – second place	2002 San Salvador	Team Jumping
Bronze medal – third place	2002 San Salvador	Team Dressage

Juan Andrés Rodríguez Silva (born September 27, 1971) is a Guatemalan equestrian rider. At age thirty-seven, Rodriguez made his official debut for the 2008 Summer Olympics in Beijing, where he competed in the jumping event, along with his horse Orestus VDL. He placed forty-first at the end of the qualifying rounds, with a total of thirty-one penalties.
