= Mario Deslauriers =

Canadian equestrian (born 1965)

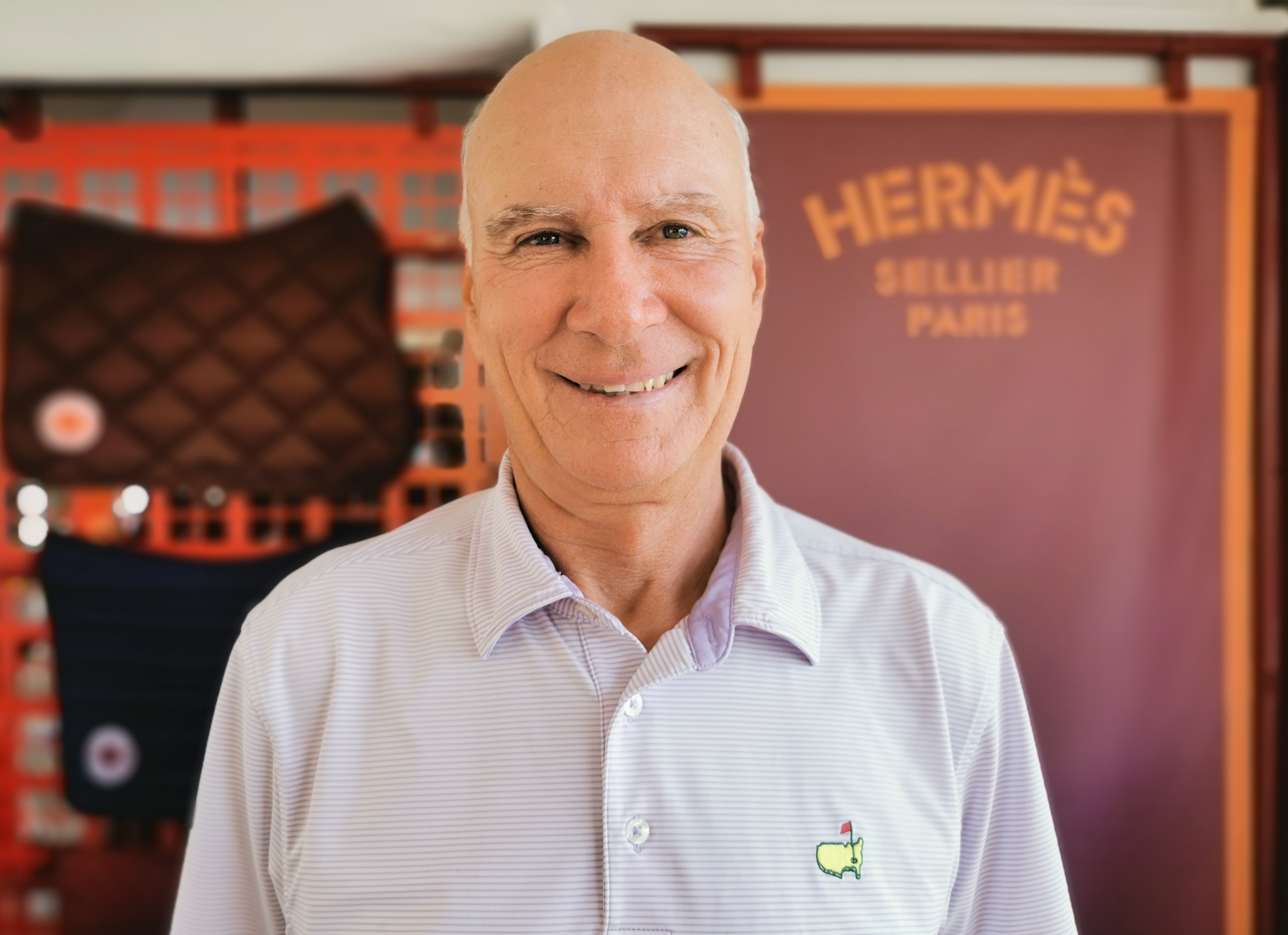
- Deslauriers at CHIO Aachen 2025

Personal information
- Discipline: Show jumping
- Born: 23 February 1965 (age 61); Venise-en-Québec, Quebec, Canada
Medal record
Equestrian
Representing Canada
World Cup
Gold medal – first place	1984 Gothenburg	Individual jumping
Pan American Games
Silver medal – second place	2023 Santiago	Team jumping

Mario Deslauriers (born 23 February 1965) is a Canadian equestrian. He competed at the Summer Olympics in 1984 and 1988 before returning after a 33 years gap, to the 2021-held 2020 games. Mario competed in the Paris 2024 Olympics as part of the Jumping Individual and Team Events.
