= Eduardo Menezes =

Brazilian equestrian (born 1980)

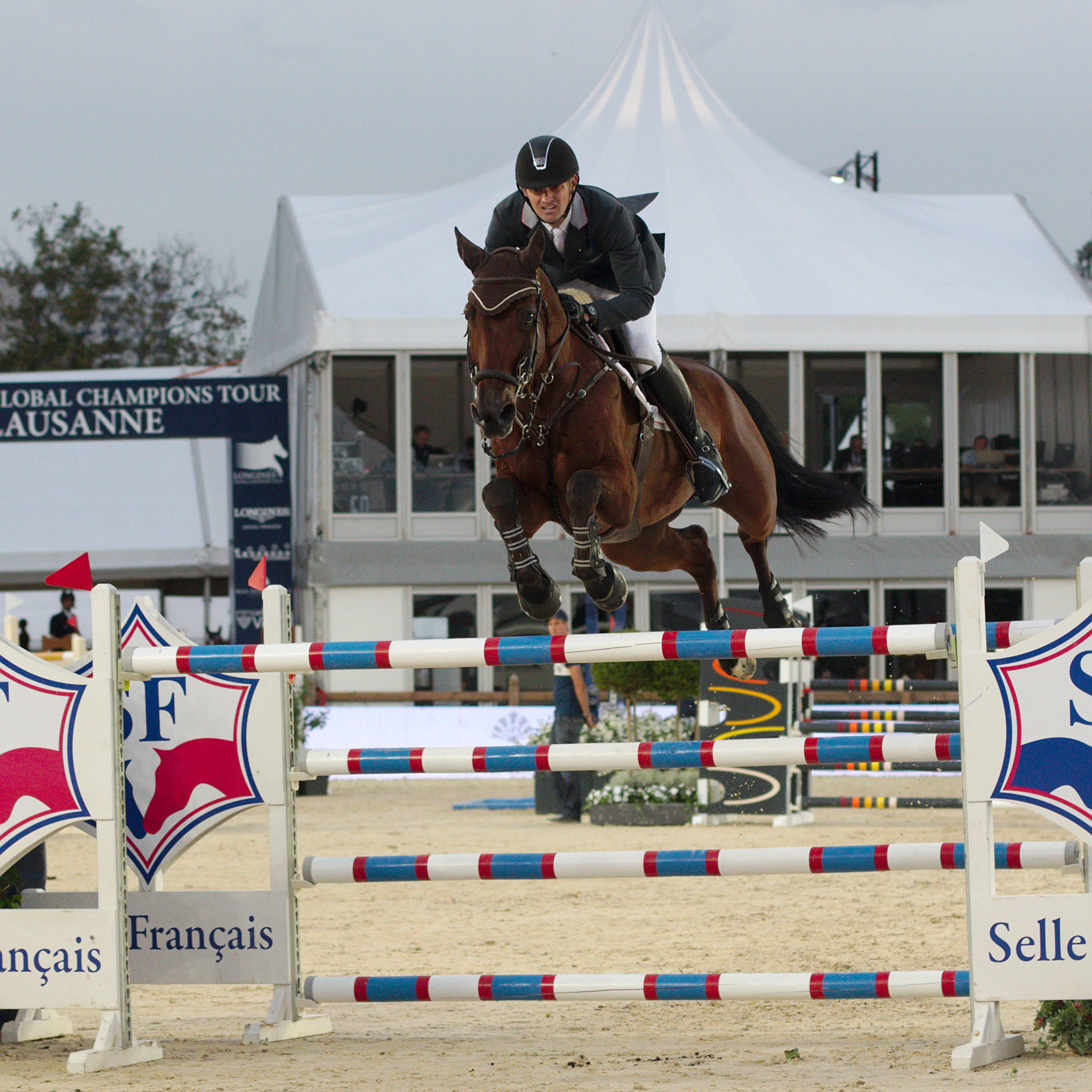

Personal information
- Full name: Eduardo Menezes
- Nationality: Brazil
- Discipline: Jumping
- Born: 1 May 1980 (age 45); Brazil
- Height: 1.93 m (6 ft 4 in)
- Weight: 84 kg (185 lb)
Medal record
Equestrian
Representing Brazil
Pan American Games
Gold medal – first place	2019 Lima	Team jumping

Eduardo Menezes (born 1 May 1980) is a Brazilian Olympic show jumping rider. He participated at the 2016 Summer Olympics in Rio de Janeiro, Brazil, where he finished 5th in the team jumping and 28th in the individual jumping competitions.

Menezes competed at the 2015 Pan American Games, finishing in 4th place teamwise and 9th individually. He also competed at the 2011 edition of the Show Jumping World Cup finals.
