= Yann Candele =

Canadian equestrian (born 1971)

Personal information
- Nationality: Canadian
- Discipline: Show jumping
- Born: March 11, 1971 (age 55); Corbie, France
Medal record
Equestrian
Representing Canada
Pan American Games
Gold medal – first place	2015 Toronto	Team jumping

Yann Candele (born March 11, 1971) is a Canadian equestrian who competes in the sport of show jumping.

He won the 2009 and 2010 Nations' Cups in Wellington, Florida. He competed at 2010 and 2014 World Equestrian Games.

In July 2016, he was named to Canada's Olympic team. His previous international experience include competing as a junior for France in the European championships, and winning the Asian World Cup League 1991–1992. He has also represented France in 2004 at the World Cup Final in Milan, Italy. He moved to Canada in 1999, coaching, riding and training at several top stables in Canada. He opened his own training business, Normandy Hills, in 2007. He became a Canadian citizen in 2009, and is currently living in Caledon, Ontario, Canada.
