= Luis Fernando Larrazabal =

Venezuelan show-jumping rider

Personal information
- Full name: Luis Fernando Larrazabal Simón
- Born: 10 October 1992 (age 33) Caracas, Venezuela

Sport
- Country: Venezuela
- Sport: Equestrian
- Event: Show jumping

Achievements and titles
- Olympic finals: 2024 Olympic Games
- World finals: 2015 Toronto; 2023 Santiago
Medal record
Equestrian
Representing Venezuela
Bolivarian Games
Gold medal – first place	2013 Lima	Team jumping
Silver medal – second place	2022 Valledupar	Team jumping
Bronze medal – third place	2017 Bogota	Team jumping
Central American and Caribbean Games
Bronze medal – third place	2023 San Salvador	Team jumping

Luis Fernando Larrazabal Simón (Note: In this Spanish name, the first or paternal surname is Larrazabal and the second or maternal family name is Simón.) (born 10 October 1992 in Caracas) is a Venezuelan Olympic show-jumping rider. He competed at the 2015 Pan American Games and at the 2023 Pan American Games. He won a golden team medal at the 2013 Bolivarian Games, with the Venezuelan team.

He is the second of the three children of Juan Larrazábal and Anabel Simon. In May 2021, he married Venezuelan Alexia María Thermiotis. On 6 October 2022, his twins were born; Athina and Alexandros and on 3 June 2024, their third daughter was born; Olympia.

Larrazabal represented Venezuela at the 2024 Olympic Games in Paris. He finished 63rd in the individual competition.
