= Pedro Veniss =

Brazilian show jumping rider

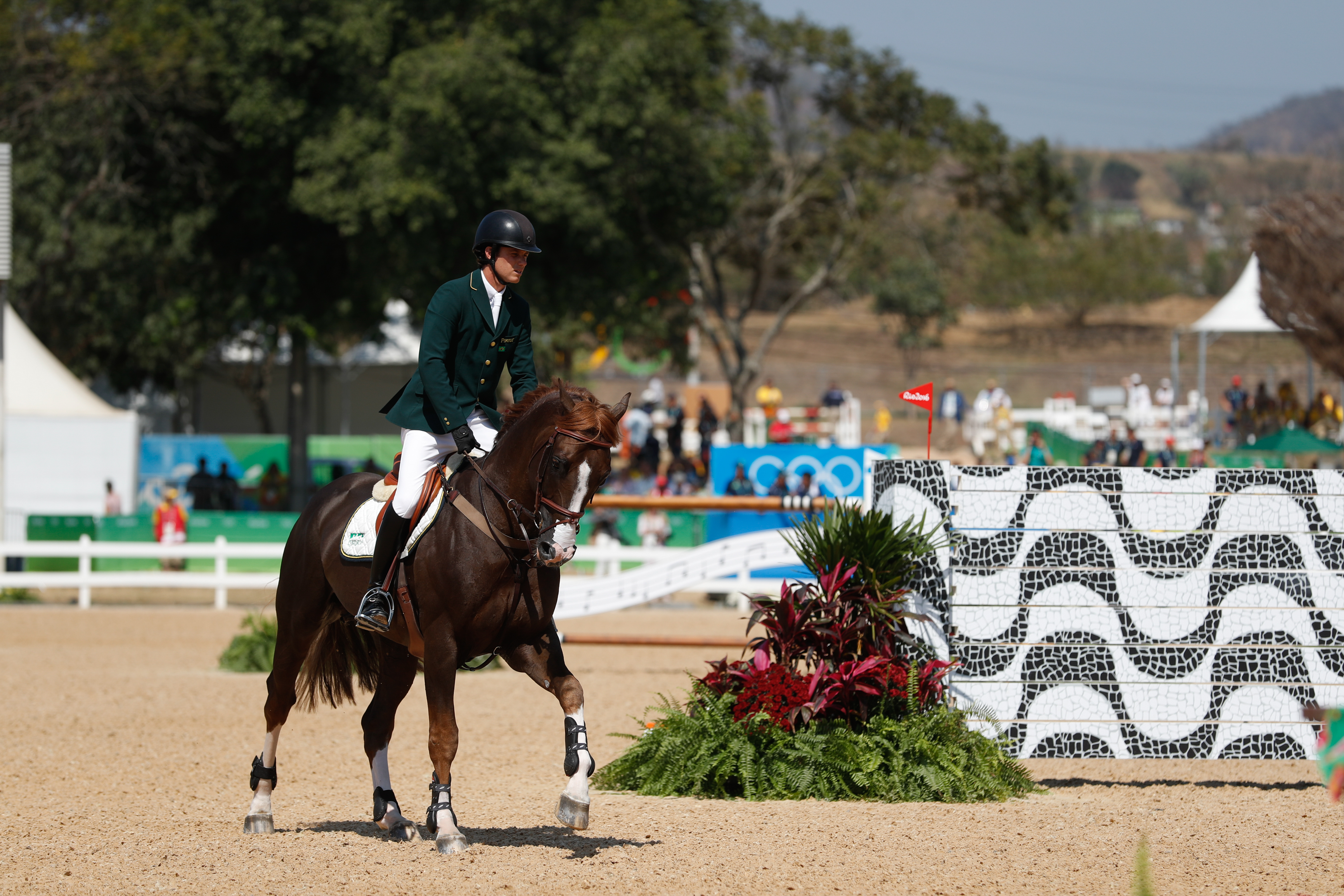
- Veniss with Quabri de L'Isle at the 2016 Olympics

Personal information
- Nationality: Brazil
- Discipline: Jumping
- Born: 6 January 1983 (age 43); São Paulo, Brazil
- Height: 1.81 m (5 ft 11 in)
- Weight: 66 kg (146 lb)
- Horse: Quabri de l'Isle
Medal record
Equestrian
Representing Brazil
Pan American Games
Gold medal – first place	2007 Rio de Janeiro	Team jumping
Gold medal – first place	2019 Lima	Team jumping
Bronze medal – third place	2023 Santiago	Team jumping

Pedro Veniss (born 6 January 1983) is a Brazilian show jumping rider. He participated at two Summer Olympics (in 2008 and 2016). His best Olympic results came in 2016, when he finished 5th in team and 16th in individual competition at the home Olympics in Rio de Janeiro.

== Career ==
Veniss competed at two World Equestrian Games (in 2010 and 2014). He finished 4th in the team competition in 2010, while his best individual placement is 35th place from both 2010 and 2014. Veniss also participated at two Pan American Games (in 2007 and 2015). In 2007, he helped the Brazilian team to win a team gold medal.

Since the beginning of 2016, Pedro Veniss has been running a tournament and trading stable in Ittre, Belgium, together with Cassio Rivetti. Previously, he presented horses at tournaments for the large trading stable “Stephex Stables” from Wolvertem.

In Lima, at the 2019 Pan American Games, Brazil won team gold, with Veniss once again riding his successful horse Quabri de l'Isle .
