= Néstor Nielsen =

Uruguayan equestrian

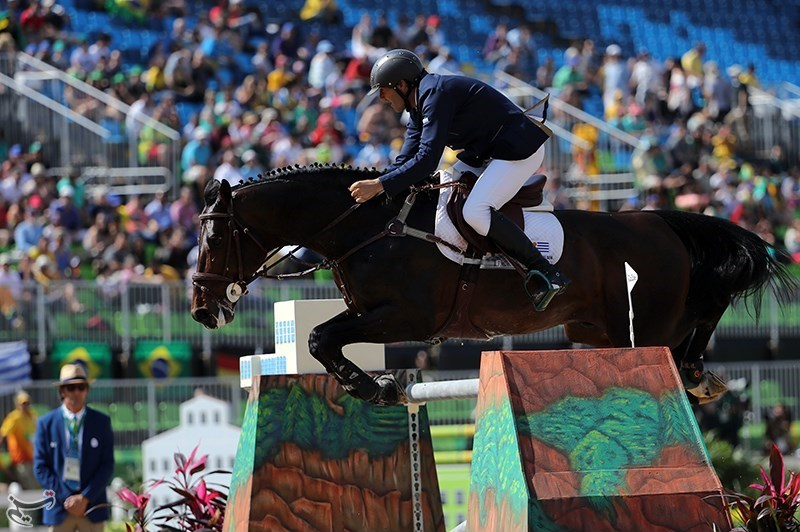
- Nestor riding Prince Royal de la Luz at the 2016 Olympics

Personal information
- Born: Néstor Nielsen van Hoff; 13 November 1972 (age 53) Montevideo, Uruguay
- Occupation: equestrian

Néstor Nielsen van Hoff (born 13 November 1972, Montevideo) is a Uruguayan Olympic show jumping rider. Representing Uruguay, he competed at the 2016 Summer Olympics in Rio de Janeiro where he finished 42nd in the individual competition, collecting 23 penalties in total during the three qualification rounds. Nestor became the first Uruguayan show jumper to compete at the Olympics after 1960.

Nielsen also competed at the 2015 Pan American Games, where he placed 9th in both team and individual jumping competitions.
