= Tiffany Foster =

Canadian equestrian (born 1984)

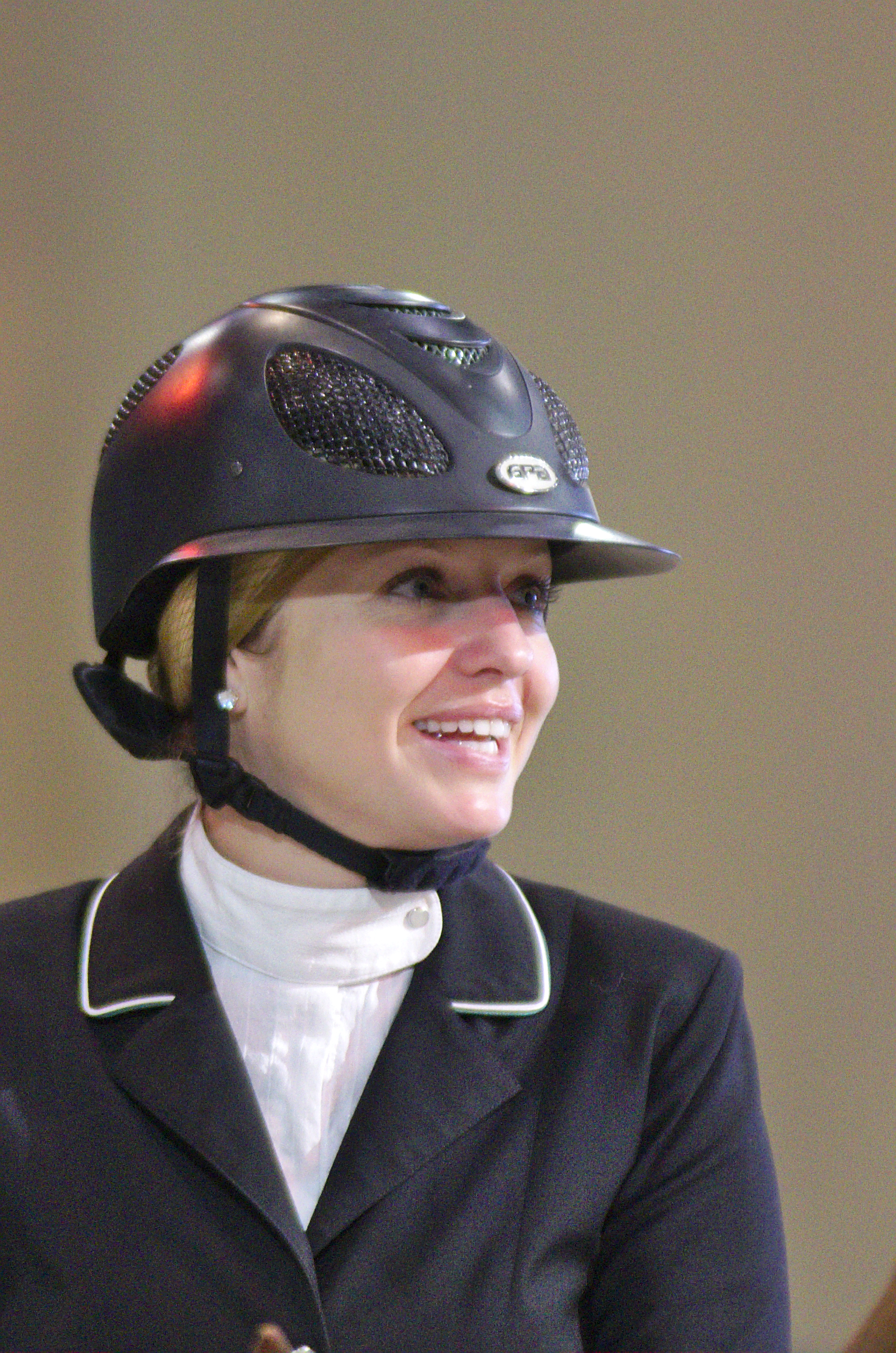
- Foster in 2013

Personal information
- Nationality: Canadian
- Discipline: Show jumping
- Born: 24 July 1984 (age 42); Vancouver, British Columbia, Canada
- Height: 5 ft 8 in (1.73 m)
- Weight: 110 lb (50 kg; 7 st 12 lb)
Medal record
Equestrian
Representing Canada
Pan American Games
Gold medal – first place	2015 Toronto	Team jumping
Silver medal – second place	2023 Santiago	Team jumping

Tiffany Foster (born 24 July 1984) is a Canadian equestrian who competes in the sport of show jumping.

At the 2012 Summer Olympics in London, Foster was a member of the Canadian team in team jumping but she was disqualified before the final due to hypersensitivity in the front leg of her horse, Victor.

In July 2015 Foster was part of the Gold medal winning team in the Toronto Pan-Am Games.

In July 2016, she was named to Canada's Olympic team.

In 2022 she was the leading Canadian rider at the World Championships in Herning, Denmark.

Foster is an avid interior decorator in her spare time. She has completed projects across the United States and in Belgium and Canada.
