= Amy Millar =

Canadian equestrian

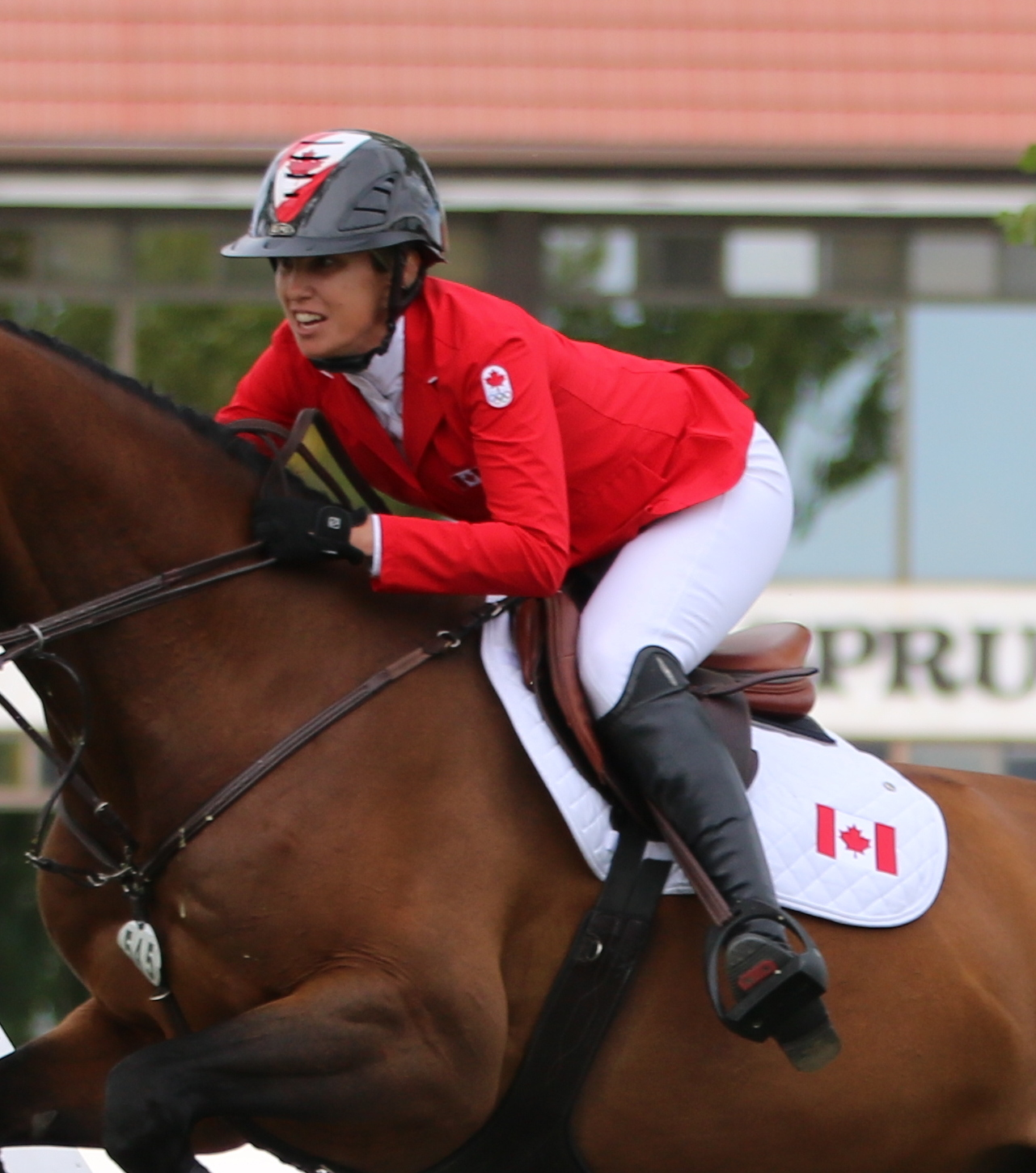

Personal information
- Discipline: Show jumping
- Born: 14 February 1977 (age 49); Ottawa, Ontario, Canada
Medal record
Equestrian
Representing Canada
Pan American Games
| Silver medal – second place | 2023 Santiago | Team jumping |

Amy Millar (born 14 February 1977) is a Canadian equestrian who competes in the sport of show jumping.

Following a successful junior career, Amy quickly enjoyed success at the Grand Prix level. She made her Nations Cup debut for Canada in 2000 at Spruce Meadows in Calgary, Alberta. She obtained over sixty top 10 finishes with the horse Costa Rica Z. In July 2016, she was a member of Canada's Olympic team in Rio de Janeiro, Brazil with her horse Heros. In 2017, Amy won the Canadian Championship at the Royal Winter Fair, and finished second in the Canadian Championship in 2018.

Millar is the daughter of Ian Millar, who has represented Canada at 10 Olympic Games. She is also sister of equestrian Jonathon Millar and sister-in-law of Kelly Soleau-Millar.
