= René Lopez (equestrian) =

Colombian equestrian

René López
Personal information
- Full name: René López Lizarazo
- Born: 5 April 1964 (age 62) Bogotá, Colombia
- Height: 168 cm (5 ft 6 in)

Sport
- Country: Colombia
- Sport: Equestrian
- Event: Show jumping

René López Lizarazo (Note: In this Spanish name, the first or paternal surname is López and the second or maternal family name is Lizarazo.) (born 5 April 1964) is a Colombian Olympic show jumping rider. He competed at the 2016 Summer Olympics in Rio de Janeiro, Brazil, where he finished 55th in the individual competition.

López also competed at the 2006 World Equestrian Games, the 2015 Pan American Games, the 2023 Pan American Games, and the 2024 Summer Olympics.
