= José María Larocca =

Argentinian equestrian

José María Larocca (Wettingen, Switzerland; 1 January 1969) is an Argentine equestrian who competes in show jumping. He represented Argentina at five consecutive Olympic Games, from Beijing 2024 to Paris 2024, and won two silver medals at the Pan American Games: in the team event at Toronto 2015 and in the individual event at Lima 2019.

His leading international results include victory in the 2024 Brussels CSI5* Rolex Grand Prix and second place in the 2026 Rolex Grand Prix of Aachen, both with Finn Lente.

== Sporting career ==
José María Larocca began riding as a child, influenced by his uncle Carlos Delía Larocca, the Argentine equestrian with the most Olympic appearances, and by his father, José María Larocca.

In 1983, he became Argentine junior champion and continued competing in Argentina in classes up to 1.40 metres. He later stepped away from equestrian sport for twelve years to focus on his professional career.

He returned to the sport in 2003 while living in England. During the first few months, he competed in local classes as part of his readjustment to competition and, in February 2004, entered his first international event. Two years later, he made his first appearance for the Argentine team at the 2006 FEI World Equestrian Games in Aachen.

During this initial period, he trained with Ivan Camargo. He later worked with Philippe Vandelanoitte and Vitor Teixeira. His early progress on the international circuit was closely linked to Royal Power, the horse with whom he began competing at the highest level and took part in his first two Olympic Games.

He later formed a partnership with Cornet du Lys, with whom he won the team silver medal at the 2015 Pan American Games in Toronto and represented Argentina at the 2016 Olympic Games in Rio de Janeiro.

With Finn Lente, he achieved his leading individual results: the silver medal at the 2019 Pan American Games in Lima, appearances at the Tokyo 2020 and Paris 2024 Olympic Games, victory in the 2024 Brussels CSI5* Rolex Grand Prix and second place in the 2026 Rolex Grand Prix of Aachen.

== Olympic appearances ==
Larocca represented Argentina in show jumping at five consecutive editions of the Olympic Games.

He competed with Royal Power at Beijing 2008 and London 2012. At Rio de Janeiro 2016, he rode Cornet du Lys, while at Tokyo 2020 and Paris 2024 he competed with Finn Lente.

At Paris 2024, he qualified for the individual final and finished 25th, the best Olympic result of his career.

Edition	Horse	Event
Beijing 2008	Royal Power	Individual jumping
London 2012	Royal Power	Individual jumping
Rio de Janeiro 2016	Cornet du Lys	Individual and team jumping
Tokyo 2020	Finn Lente	Individual jumping
Paris 2024	Finn Lente	Individual jumping

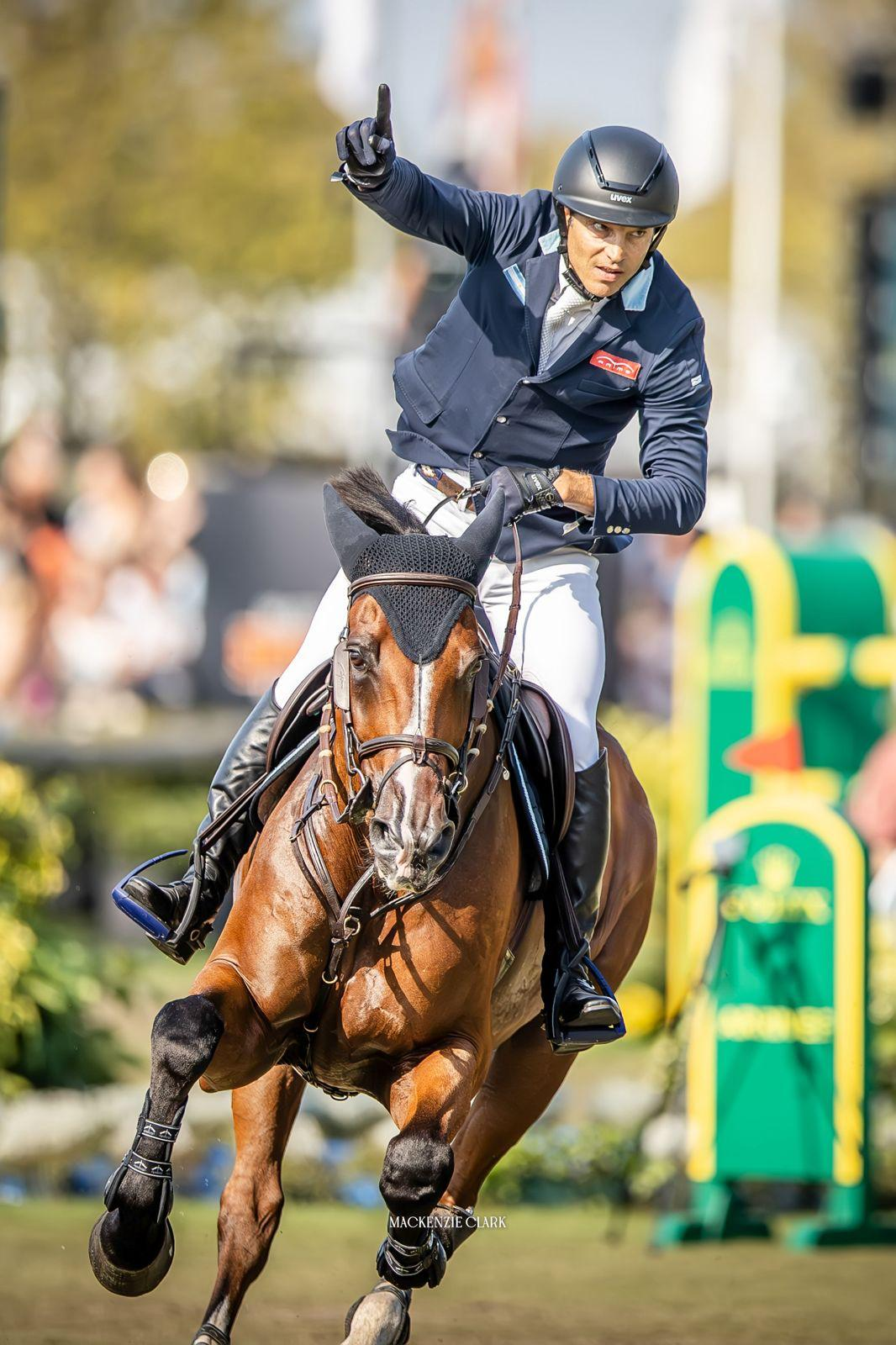
Rolex Grand Prix CSI5* Brussels 2024

For José María, competing at the Olympic Games was associated with the pride of representing Argentina and with team competition. At Beijing 2008, he was Argentina's sole representative in show jumping, while at London 2012 and Rio de Janeiro 2016 he was part of the national team.

== Pan American Games and other results ==
Larocca competed at four consecutive editions of the Pan American Games: Guadalajara 2011, Toronto 2015, Lima 2019 and Santiago 2023.

At Guadalajara 2011, he competed with Royal Power and was the highest-placed Argentine rider in show jumping. Four years later, he won the team silver medal at Toronto 2015 alongside Matías Albarracín, Luis Pedro Biraben and Ramiro Quintana.

The result in Toronto marked Argentina's return to the Pan American team show jumping podium and secured the national team's qualification for the 2016 Olympic Games in Rio de Janeiro. Larocca competed with Cornet du Lys.

At Lima 2019, he won the individual silver medal with Finn Lente. At Santiago 2023, he again competed with the same horse, and his performance helped Argentina secure an individual quota place for the Paris 2024 Olympic Games.

His notable international Grand Prix results include:

- Second place in the Brussels CSI5* Grand Prix in 2023.
- Victory in the Brussels CSI5* Rolex Grand Prix in 2024, with Finn Lente.
- Second place in the Rolex Grand Prix of Aachen in 2026, with Finn Lente.
- Victory in the Bourg-en-Bresse CSI4* Grand Prix in 2026, with Finn Lente.

In 2024, he and his son, Matías Larocca, were members of the Argentine team that competed in the five-star Nations Cup in Sopot, Poland. Riding Finn Lente and BM Gran Fantasia, respectively, they both completed clear rounds — an unprecedented achievement in the history of the sport for a father and son in a five-star Nations Cup."

== Notable horses ==
=== Royal power ===
Royal Power was the horse with whom José María Larocca began achieving results at the highest level of international competition. The pair represented Argentina at the Beijing 2008 and London 2012 Olympic Games, as well as at the 2011 Pan American Games in Guadalajara.

=== Cornet du Lys ===
Cornet du Lys is a stallion by Cornet Obolensky out of Chablis du Lys, by Champion du Lys. With Larocca, he won the team silver medal at Toronto 2015.

The pair also competed at the 2016 Olympic Games in Rio de Janeiro and in various Grands Prix and Nations Cups. After retiring from competition, Cornet du Lys continued his career as a breeding stallion.

=== Finn Lente ===
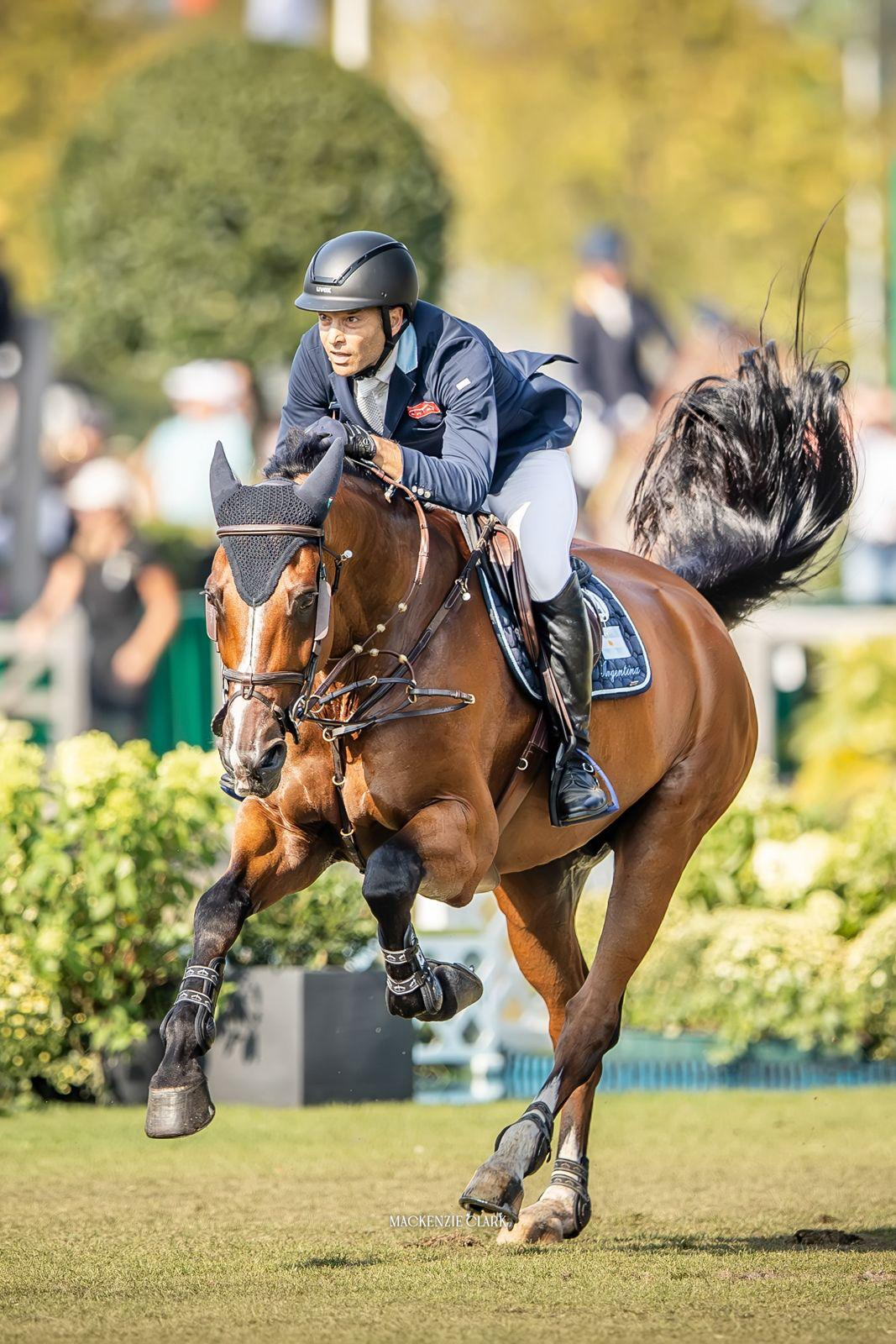
Rolex Grand Prix CSI5* de Brussels 2024

Finn Lente is by Gaillard de la Pomme out of Cherlynn Lente, by Colandro.

With Larocca, he won the individual silver medal at the 2019 Pan American Games in Lima and competed at the Tokyo 2020 and Paris 2024 Olympic Games. The pair also won the 2024 Brussels CSI5* Rolex Grand Prix and finished second in the 2026 Rolex Grand Prix of Aachen.

== Breeding activities and role as Director o Faro Verde Ecuestre ==
In addition to competing as a rider, Larocca is involved in breeding and developing show jumping horses and serves as Director of Faro Verde Ecuestre.

The project began on a rural property in Ayacucho, Buenos Aires Province, and later consolidated its breeding operations at Haras San José del Moro, located in Pieres, in the district of Lobería.

The programme focuses on producing show jumping horses for high-performance competition. The process includes the selection of bloodlines, breeding, rearing, veterinary monitoring and initial training. Their sporting preparation continues at the Tierra Santa Training Centre in Escobar, Buenos Aires Province.

Each horse has an individual development programme and a record of its veterinary history, training and sporting performance. The operation comprises more than 230 horses at various stages of development, records approximately thirty births each year and trains more than thirty horses annually.

Horses bred through the programme compete on national and international circuits, including events held in Europe.

== Internacional track record ==
Pan American Games
Year	Venue	Medal	Category
2015	Toronto, Canada	2nd place	Team
2019	Lima, Perú	2nd place	Individual
International results
2023	Rolex Grand Prix CSI* in Brussels	2n place	Individual
2024	Rolex Grand Prix CSI5*	1st place	Individual
2026	Rolex Grand Prix in Aachen	2nd place	Individual
2026	Grand Prix CSI4* in Bourg-en-Bresse	1st place	Individual
