= Equestrian at the 2015 Pan American Games – Individual dressage =

Individual dressage at the 2015 Pan American Games
- Venues: Caledon Equestrian Park
- Dates: July 11–14
- Competitors: 43 from 16 nations

Medalists
Gold medal	Steffen Peters on Legolas 92; United States
Silver medal	Laura Graves on Verdades; United States
Bronze medal	Christopher von Martels on Zilverstar; Canada

The individual dressage competition of the equestrian events at the 2015 Pan American Games took place July 11–14 at the Caledon Equestrian Park.

The first round of the individual dressage competition was the FEI Prix St. Georges Test. The Prix St. Georges Test consists of a battery of required movements that each rider and horse pair performs. Five judges evaluate the pair, giving marks between 0 and 10 for each element. The judges' scores are averaged to give a final score for the pair.

The top 25 individual competitors in that round advanced to the individual-only competitions, though each nation is limited to three pairs advancing. This second round consisted of an Intermediare I Test, which is a higher degree of difficulty. The 15 best pairs in the Intermediare I Test advance to the final round. That round consists of, the Intermediare I Freestyle Test, competitors design their own choreography set to music. Judges in that round evaluate the artistic merit of the performance and music as well as the technical aspects of the dressage. Final scores are based on the average of the Freestyle and Intermediare I Test results.

The top team not already qualified in the dressage team events qualified for the 2016 Summer Olympics in Rio de Janeiro, Brazil, along with the top two placed teams (not already qualified) in the show jumping competition. In the individual dressage competition, the top nation (not qualified in the team event) in groups IV and V will each qualify one quota. The top six athletes (not qualified in the team event) will also qualify for the show jumping competition.

== Schedule ==
All times are Central Standard Time (UTC-6).

Date	Time	Round
July 11, 2015	9:00	Grand Prix
July 12, 2015	9:00	Grand Prix Special
July 14, 2015	11:00	Grand Prix Freestyle

== Judges ==
Appointment of Dressage judges was as follows:

Dressage

- (Canada) Elizabeth McMullen (Ground Jury President)
- (United States) Liselotte Fore (Ground Jury Member)
- (Denmark) Hans-Christian Matthiesen (Ground Jury Member)
- (Mexico) Maribel Alonso de Quinzanos (Ground Jury Member)
- (United Kingdom) Stephen Clarke (Ground Jury Member)
- (Belgium) Freddy Leyman (Technical Delegate)

== Results ==
=== Qualification ===
Rank	Rider	Nation	Horse	PG / GP		Int I / GPS		Total	Notes
Rank	Rider	Nation	Horse	Score	Rank	Score	Rank	Total	Notes
1	Kimberly Herslow	United States	Rosmarin	75.184	3	77.158	2	152.342	Q
2	Laura Graves	United States	Verdades	75.080	4	77.177	1	152.257	Q
3	Brittany Fraser	Canada	All in	76.105	2	76.079	4	152.184	Q
4	Christopher von Martels	Canada	Zilverstar	75.026	5	76.210	3	151.236	Q
5	Steffen Peters	United States	Legolas 92	77.240	1	72.667	7	149.907	Q
6	Belinda Trussell	Canada	Anton	73.440	6	75.078	5	148.518	Q
7	Sabine Schut-Kery	United States	Sanceo	71.790	7	73.553	6	145.343	
8	Megan Lane	Canada	Caravella	70.900	8	71.392	8	142.292	
9	Luis Denizard	Puerto Rico	Royal Affair	69.395	13	70.211	9	139.606	Q
10	Virginia Yarur	Chile	Finn	69.158	16	70.210	10	139.368	Q
11	Jesús Palacios	Mexico	Wizard Banamex	69.526	10	69.500	12	139.026	Q
12	Leandro Aparecido da Silva	Brazil	Di Caprio	69.474	11	69.026	15	138.500	Q
13	João Victor Marcari Oliva	Brazil	Xama dos Pinhais	69.184	15	69.211	14	138.395	Q
14	Maria Florencia Manfredi	Argentina	Bandurria Kacero	68.658	17	69.369	13	138.027	Q
15	João Paulo dos Santos	Brazil	Veleiro do Top	67.842	19	70.158	11	138.000	Q
16	Bernadette Pujals	Mexico	Heslegaards Rolex	69.440	12	67.922	17	137.362	Q
17	Esther Mortimer Jones	Guatemala	Adajio	70.290	9	67.053	20	137.343	Q
18	Bernal Raul Corchuelo	Colombia	Beckham	69.237	14	67.658	18	136.895	Q
19	Julio Cesar Mendoza Loor	Ecuador	Chardonnay	67.026	21	68.211	16	135.237	Q
20	Marco Bernal	Colombia	Farewell IV	67.921	18	66.921	21	134.842	Q
21	Christer Egerstrom	Costa Rica	Bello Oriente	66.790	22	66.658	23	133.448	Q
22	José Luis Padilla	Mexico	Donnesberg	66.237	23	66.842	22	133.079	Q
23	Micaela Mabragana	Argentina	Granada	67.220	20	65.667	25	132.887	
24	Sarah Waddell	Brazil	Donelly 3	65.632	26	67.184	19	132.816	
25	Irina Moleiro de Muro	Venezuela	Von Primaire	65.500	27	66.632	24	132.132	Q
26	Alejandro Gomez Sigala	Venezuela	Zalvador	66.105	24	64.210	27	130.315	
27	Anne Egerstrom	Costa Rica	Amorino	66.053	25	63.552	28	129.605	
28	Patricia Ferrando Zilio	Venezuela	Alpha's Why Not	63.158	32	65.447	26	128.605	
29	Andrea Schorpp Pinot	Guatemala	Zedrick Dyloma	65.368	28	63.237	29	128.605	
30	Cesar Lopardo Grana	Argentina	Tyara	63.200	31	62.980	30	126.180	
31	Alexandra Domínguez	Guatemala	Beijing A	64.184	29	61.500	39	125.684	
32	Karen Atala Zablah	Honduras	Weissenfels	63.316	30	62.000	35	125.316	
33	Juan Sanchez de Brigard	Colombia	First Fisherman	62.658	33	62.289	32	124.947	
34	Virginia McKey	Bermuda	Wolkenglanz	61.421	37	62.816	31	124.237	
35	Michelle Batalla Navarro	Costa Rica	Vivi Light	61.868	35	62.026	33	123.894	
36	Margarita de Castillo	Guatemala	Quanderus	61.579	36	62.026	33	123.605	
37	Julio Fonseca	Chile	Wettkonig	60.947	39	61.947	36	122.894	
38	Oscar Coddou	Chile	Favory Duba 66	62.579	34	60.237	41	122.816	
39	Ramon Beca	Uruguay	Zaire	60.960	38	61.647	38	122.607	
40	Maria Ugalde	Argentina	Caquel Cautivo	60.658	40	61.421	40	122.079	
41	Manuel Montero	Chile	Everybody Dance Now	58.842	41	61.868	37	120.710	
	Maria Aponte	Colombia	Prety Woman	57.789	42	NS			
	Yvonne Losos de Muñiz	Dominican Republic	Foco Loco W	EL					

=== Final round ===
Rank	Rider	Nation	Horse	GPF Score	Notes
1st place, gold medalist(s)	Steffen Peters	United States	Legolas 92	80.075	
2nd place, silver medalist(s)	Laura Graves	United States	Verdades	79.825	
3rd place, bronze medalist(s)	Christopher von Martels	Canada	Zilverstar	79.500	
4	Belinda Trussell	Canada	Anton	76.800	
4	Brittany Fraser	Canada	All in	76.800	
6	Leandro Aparecido da Silva	Brazil	Di Caprio	73.300	
7	João Victor Marcari Oliva	Brazil	Xama dos Pinhais	73.275	
8	Kimberly Herslow	United States	Rosmarin	73.175	
9	João Paulo dos Santos	Brazil	Veleiro do Top	72.950	
10	Jesús Palacios	Mexico	Wizard Banamex	71.525	
11	Esther Mortimer Jones	Guatemala	Adajio	71.450	
12	Virginia Yarur	Chile	Finn	71.175	
13	Maria Manfredi	Argentina	Bandurria Kacero	70.725	
13	Luis Denizard	Puerto Rico	Royal Affair	70.725	
15	Bernadette Pujals	Mexico	Heslegaards Rolex	70.600	
16	Bernal Raul Corchuelo	Colombia	Beckham	69.950	
17	Julio Mendoza Loor	Ecuador	Chardonnay	69.800	
18	José Luis Padilla	Mexico	Donnesberg	69.350	
19	Marco Bernal	Colombia	Farewell IV	68.975	
20	Christer Egerstrom	Costa Rica	Bello Oriente	68.675	
21	Irina Moleiro de Muro	Venezuela	Von Primaire	66.600	
