= Equestrian at the 2015 Pan American Games – Team dressage =

Team dressage at the 2015 Pan American Games
- Venues: Caledon Equestrian Park
- Dates: July 11–12, 2015.
- Competitors: 37 from 10 nations

Medalists
Gold medal	Sabine Schut-Kery on Sanceo; Kimberly Herslow on Rosmarin; Laura Graves on Verdades; Steffen Peters on Legolas 92	United States
Silver medal	Christopher von Martels on Zilverstar; Brittany Fraser on All in Megan Lane on Caravella; Belinda Trussell on Anton	Canada
Bronze medal	Leandro Aparecido da Silva on Di Caprio; Sarah Waddell on Donelly 3 João Victor Marcari Oliva on Xama dos Pinhais; João Paulo dos Santos on Veleiro do Top	Brazil

The team dressage competition of the equestrian events at the 2015 Pan American Games took place July 11–12 at the Caledon Equestrian Park.

The first round of the team dressage competition was the FEI Prix St. Georges Test. The Prix St. Georges Test consists of a battery of required movements that each rider and horse pair performs. Five judges evaluate the pair, giving marks between 0 and 10 for each element. The judges' scores are averaged to give a final score for the pair.

The top 9 team competitors in that round advanced to the final round. This second round consisted of an Intermediare I Test, which is a higher degree of difficulty. The 9 best teams in the Intermediare I Test advance to the final round. That round consists of, the Intermediare I Freestyle Test, competitors design their own choreography set to music. Judges in that round evaluate the artistic merit of the performance and music as well as the technical aspects of the dressage. Final scores are based on the average of the Freestyle and Intermediare I Test results.

The top team not already qualified in the dressage team events qualified for the 2016 Summer Olympics in Rio de Janeiro, Brazil, along with the top two placed teams (not already qualified) in the show jumping competition. In the individual dressage competition, the top nation (not qualified in the team event) in groups IV and V each qualified one quota. The top six athletes (not qualified in the team event) also qualified for the show jumping competition.

== Schedule ==
All times are Central Standard Time (UTC-6).

Date	Time	Round
July 11, 2015	9:00	Grand Prix
July 12, 2015	9:00	Grand Prix Special

== Results ==
37 competitors from 10 nations competed.

Rank	Nation	Name	Horse	PG / GP Score			Int I / GPS			Total
Rank	Nation	Name	Horse	Individual	Team	Rank	Individual	Team	Rank	Total
1st place, gold medalist(s)	United States	Sabine Schut-Kery; Kimberly Herslow; Laura Graves; Steffen Peters	Sanceo; Rosmarin; Verdades; Legolas 92	# 71.790; 75.184; 76.580*; 78.740*	230.504	1	# 73.553; 77.158; 78.677*; 74.167*	230.002	1	460.506
2nd place, silver medalist(s)	Canada	Brittany Fraser; Christopher von Martels; Belinda Trussell; Megan Lane	All In; Zilverstar; Anton; Caravella	76.105; 75.026; 74.940* # 72.400*	226.071	2	76.079; 76.210; 76.578* # 72.892*	228.867	2	454.938
3rd place, bronze medalist(s)	Brazil	Leandro Aparecido da Silva; João Victor Marcari Oliva; João Paulo dos Santos; Sarah Waddell	Di Caprio; Xama dos Pinhais; Veleiro do Top; Donelly 3	69.474; 69.184; 67.842 # 65.632	206.500	4	69.026; 69.211; 70.158 # 67.184	208.395	3	414.895
4	Mexico	Jesús Palacios; Bernadette Pujals; José Luis Padilla	Wizard Banamex; Heslegaards Rolex; Donnesberg	69.526; 70.940*; 66.237	206.703	3	69.500; 69.422*; 66.842	205.764	4	412.467
5	Argentina	Maria Florencia Manfredi; Micaela Mabragana; Cesar Lopardo Grana; Maria Ugalde	Bandurria Kacero; Granada; Tyara; Caquel Cautivo	68.658; 68.720*; 64.700* # 60.658	202.078	5	69.369; 67.167*; 64.480* # 61.421	201.016	5	403.094
6	Colombia	Bernal Raul Corchuelo; Marco Bernal; Juan Sanchez de Brigard; Maria Aponte González	Beckham; Farewell IV; First Fisherman; Prety Woman	69.237; 67.921; 62.658 # 57.789	199.816	7	67.658; 66.921; 62.289 # 0.000	196.868	6	396.684
7	Guatemala	Esther Mortimer Jones; Andrea Schorpp Pinot; Alexandra Domínguez; Margarita de Castillo	Adajio; Zedrick Dyloma; Beijing A Quanderus	70.290; 65.368; 64.184 # 61.579	199.842	6	67.053; 63.237; 61.500 # 62.026	191.790	10	391.632
8	Venezuela	Irina Moleiro de Muro; Alejandro Gomez Sigala; Patricia Ferrando Zilio	Von Primaire; Zalvador; Alpha's Why Not	65.500; 66.105; 63.158	194.763	8	66.632; 64.210; 65.447	196.289	7	391.052
9	Costa Rica	Christer Egerstrom; Anne Egerstrom; Michelle Batalla Navarro	Bello Oriente; Amorino; Vivi Light	66.790; 66.053; 61.868	194.711	9	66.658; 63.552; 62.026	192.236	9	386.947
10	Chile	Virginia Yarur; Julio Fonseca; Oscar Coddou; Manuel Montero	Finn; Wettkonig; Favory Duba 66; Everybody Dance Now	69.158; 60.947; 62.579 # 58.842	192.684	10	70.210; 61.947; 60.237 # 61.868	192.394	8	385.078

# - Rider's score not counted in team total * - Includes 1.5% Bonus for Big Tour Riders
