= Equestrian at the 2014 Central American and Caribbean Games =

- Venue: Coapexpan Equestrian Club
- Location: Veracruz, Mexico
- Dates: 16-23 November

The Equestrian competition at the 2014 Central American and Caribbean Games was held in Veracruz, Mexico.

The tournament was scheduled to be held from 15–29 November at the Coapexpan Equestrian Club.

== Medal summary ==
=== Dressage ===
| Event | Gold | Silver | Bronze |
|---|---|---|---|
| Dressage | Bernadette Pujals (MEX) | Marco Bernal (COL) | Yvonne Losos de Muñiz (DOM) |
| Dressage Individual Final | Marco Bernal (COL) | Yvonne Losos de Muñiz (DOM) | Bernadette Pujals (MEX) |
| Dressage Team | Mexico (MEX); Jose Luis Padilla; Bernadette Pujals; Mariana Quintana; Omar Zayrik | Colombia (COL); Marco Bernal Kalb; Marco Bernal; Raul Corchuelo; Radme Mahamud | Guatemala (GUA); Margarita de Castillo; Sylvia Luna; Andrea Schorpp |

=== Eventing ===
| Event | Gold | Silver | Bronze |
|---|---|---|---|
| Eventing | Stefanie Brand Leu (GUA) | Carlos Sueiras (GUA) | Guillermo de Campo (MEX) |
| Eventing Team | Guatemala (GUA); Stefanie Brand Leu; Alvaro Del Valle; Sarka Kolackova; Carlos Sueiras | Mexico (MEX); Guillermo de Campo; Pedro Gutiérrez; Jose Mercado; Daniela Moguel | Colombia (COL); Anne Brieke; Santiago Medina; Jhonathan Rodriguez; Juan Tafur |

=== Jumping ===
| Event | Gold | Silver | Bronze |
|---|---|---|---|
| Jumping | Roberto Terán (COL) | Emanuel Andrade (VEN) | Hector Florentino (DOM) |
| Jumping Individual Speed | Hector Florentino (DOM) | Roberto Terán (COL) | Daniel Bluman (COL) |
| Jumping Individual Final | Gonzalo Azcarraga (MEX) | Angel Karolyi (VEN) | Hector Florentino (DOM) |
| Jumping Team | Colombia (COL); Daniel Bluman; Mauricio Guevara; Roberto Terán; Ricardo Villa | Guatemala (GUA); Ivonne Balz; Eduardo Castillo; Cristina Heurtematte; Alvaro Tejada | Venezuela (VEN); Emanuel Andrade; Pablo Barrios; Angel Karolyi; Andrés Rodríguez |

== Medal table ==
* Host nation (Mexico)

| Rank | Nation | Gold | Silver | Bronze | Total |
|---|---|---|---|---|---|
| 1 | Colombia (COL) | 3 | 3 | 2 | 8 |
| 2 | Mexico (MEX)* | 3 | 1 | 2 | 6 |
| 3 | Guatemala (GUA) | 2 | 2 | 1 | 5 |
| 4 | Dominican Republic (DOM) | 1 | 1 | 3 | 5 |
| 5 | Venezuela (VEN) | 0 | 2 | 1 | 3 |
| Totals (5 entries) | | 9 | 9 | 9 | 27 |
