= Equestrian at the 2023 Pan American Games – Qualification =

The following is the qualification system and list of qualified nations for the Equestrian at the 2023 Pan American Games competition.

== Qualification system ==
A quota of 150 equestrian riders (44 dressage, 46 eventing and 60 show jumping) will be allowed to qualify. A maximum of 12 athletes can compete for a nation across all events (with a maximum of four per discipline). Athletes qualified through various qualifying events and rankings.

If a country does not qualify a team in equestrian, it may enter a maximum of two individuals per discipline. A team can be made up of three of four athletes, meaning if reallocation does occur, countries with individuals can qualify teams, respecting the maximum number of teams allowed to compete in each discipline.

== Qualification summary ==
A total of 25 NOC's qualified equestrians.

Nation	Individual			Team			Total
Nation	Dressage	Eventing	Jumping	Dressage	Eventing	Jumping	Total
Argentina	4	4	4	X	X	X	12
Bahamas			1				1
Barbados	1	1					2
Bermuda	1						1
Bolivia			2				2
Brazil	4	4	4	X	X	X	12
Canada	4	4	4	X	X	X	12
Chile	4	4	4	X	X	X	12
Colombia	4	4	4	X	X	X	12
Costa Rica	4			X			4
Dominican Republic	2		4			X	6
Ecuador	2	4	4		X	X	10
El Salvador			1				1
Guatemala	1	4	2		X		7
Honduras		1					1
Jamaica		1					1
Mexico	4	4	4	X	X	X	12
Panama			2				2
Paraguay			2				2
Peru		2	2				4
Puerto Rico	1	1	4			X	6
Trinidad and Tobago	1						1
United States	4	4	4	X	X	X	12
Uruguay	2	4	4		X	X	10
Venezuela	1		4			X	5
Total: 25 NOCs	44	46	60	8	10	12	150

== Qualification timeline ==
Events	Date	Venue
2022 South American Games	October 2–11, 2022	(Paraguay) Asunción
2022 PAEC South American Championship	November 3–6, 2022	(Argentina) Campo de Mayo
2023 Central American and Caribbean Games	June 23–July 8, 2023	(El Salvador) San Salvador
FEI Dressage/Eventing rankings	June 30, 2023	—N/a
FEI Jumping rankings	July 31, 2023	—N/a

== Dressage ==
A total of eight teams of 4 (or 3) athletes each will qualify, along with 12 individuals who will qualify for a total of 44 athletes.

=== Team ===
Event	Vacancies	Qualified
Host Nation	1	Chile
2022 South American Games	2	Brazil; Argentina
2023 Central American and Caribbean Games	3	Colombia; Mexico; Costa Rica
FEI World Dressage Rankings	2	United States; Canada
TOTAL	8	

=== Individual ===
Event	Vacancies	Qualified
2022 South American Games	3	Ecuador; Uruguay; Uruguay
2023 Central American and Caribbean Games	5	Dominican Republic; Barbados; Guatemala; Puerto Rico; Dominican Republic
FEI World Dressage Rankings	4	Ecuador; Venezuela; Bermuda; Trinidad and Tobago
TOTAL	12	

== Eventing ==
A total of ten teams of 4 (or 3) athletes each will qualify, along with 6 individuals will qualify for a total of 46 athletes.

=== Team ===
Event	Vacancies	Qualified
Host Nation	1	Chile
2022 PAEC South American Championship	3	Brazil; Argentina; Uruguay
2023 Central American and Caribbean Games	~~4~~ 3	Mexico; Colombia; Guatemala
FEI World Eventing Rankings	2	United States; Canada
Composite team	1	Ecuador
TOTAL	10	

- A team quota was not filled and, its four quotas were reallocated as individuals.

=== Individual ===
Event	Vacancies	Qualified
2022 PAEC South American Championship	2	Ecuador; Ecuador
2023 Central American and Caribbean Games	2	Puerto Rico; Barbados
FEI World Eventing Ranking	~~2~~ 6	Peru; Peru; Ecuador; Ecuador; Jamaica; Honduras
TOTAL	6	

- A team quota was not filled and, its four quotas were reallocated as individuals. Ecuador received 4 individual quotas and can enter as a team.

== Jumping ==
A total of 12 teams of 4 (or 3) athletes each will qualify, along with 12 individuals will qualify for a total of 60 athletes.

=== Team ===
Event	Vacancies	Qualified
Host Nation	1	Chile
2022 South American Games	3	Brazil; Argentina; Uruguay
2023 Central American and Caribbean Games	4	Mexico; Colombia; Venezuela; Dominican Republic
FEI Jumping Pan American Ranking	4	United States; Canada; Ecuador; Puerto Rico
TOTAL	12	

=== Individual ===
Event	Vacancies	Qualified
2022 South American Games	4	Peru; Bolivia; Paraguay; Bolivia
2023 Central American and Caribbean Games	4	El Salvador; Panama; Panama; Guatemala
FEI Jumping Pan American Ranking	4	Paraguay; Bahamas; Peru; Guatemala
TOTAL	12	
