= Equestrian at the 2018 Central American and Caribbean Games =

- Venue: Escuela de Equitación del Ejercito
- Location: (Colombia) Barranquilla
- Dates: 20–29 July

The equestrian competition at the 2018 Central American and Caribbean Games was held in Barranquilla, Colombia from 20 to 29 July at the Escuela de Equitación del Ejercito.

== Medal summary ==
=== Dressage ===
Event	Gold	Silver	Bronze
Individual	Yvonne Losos de Muñiz (DOM)	Monica Burssens (MEX)	Esther Mortimer (GUA)
Individual Final	Yvonne Losos de Muñiz (DOM)	Monica Burssens (MEX)	Mariana Quintana (MEX)
Team	Mexico (MEX); Monica Burssens; Jesus Palacios; Bernadette Pujals; Mariana Quintana	Dominican Republic (DOM); Stephanie Engstrom; George Fernandez; Yvonne Losos de Muñiz	Guatemala (GUA); Isabel Arzu; Alexandra Dominguez; Esther Mortimer; Vivian Schorpp

=== Eventing ===
Event	Gold	Silver	Bronze
Individual	Jose Triana (MEX)	Guillermo de Campo (MEX)	Sofia Baussan (ESA)
Team	Mexico (MEX); Jorge Toledo; Jose Triana; Fernando Parroquin; Guillermo de Campo	Guatemala (GUA); Carlos Sueiras; Stefanie Brand; Wylder Rodriguez; Sarka Kolackova	Barbados (BAR); Laura Smith; Monique Archer; Zoe Archer

=== Jumping ===
Event	Gold	Silver	Bronze
Individual	Pablo Barrios (VEN)	Hector Florentino (DOM)	Alvaro Tejada (GUA)
Individual Speed	Francisco Pasquel (MEX)	Alvaro Tejada (GUA)	Pablo Barrios (VEN)
Individual Final	Pablo Barrios (VEN)	Francisco Pasquel (MEX)	Emanuel Andrade (VEN)
Team	Mexico (MEX); Salvador Onate; Francisco Pasquel; Luis Plascencia; Alberto Sanchez-Cozar	Colombia (COL); Juan Pablo Betancourt; Fernando Cardenas; Santiago Medina; Lina Rojas	Guatemala (GUA); Juan Pablo Pivaral; Wylder Rodriguez; Juan Diego Saenz; Alvaro Tejada

== Medal table ==
* Host nation (Colombia)

Rank	Nation	Gold	Silver	Bronze	Total
1	Mexico (MEX)	5	4	1	10
2	Dominican Republic (DOM)	2	2	0	4
3	Venezuela (VEN)	2	0	2	4
4	Guatemala (GUA)	0	2	4	6
5	Colombia (COL)*	0	1	0	1
6	Barbados (BAR)	0	0	1	1
6	El Salvador (ESA)	0	0	1	1
Totals (7 entries)		9	9	9	27
