= Jaime Velásquez =

Mexican equestrian

Personal information
- Full name: Jaime Velásquez Suárez
- Nationality: Mexican
- Born: 14 July 1962 (age 62)
Medal record
Equestrian
Representing Mexico
Pan American Games
Bronze medal – third place	1991 Chatsworth	Team eventing
Central American and Caribbean Games
Gold medal – first place	2002 San Salvador	Individual eventing
Gold medal – first place	2002 San Salvador	Team eventing
Gold medal – first place	2010 Mayagüez	Team eventing

Jaime Velásquez Suárez (Note: In this Spanish name, the first or paternal surname is Velásquez and the second or maternal family name is Suárez.) (born 14 July 1962) is a Mexican equestrian. He competed in the individual eventing at the 1992 Summer Olympics.
