= Bolibourgeoisie =

Term for the new bourgeois Venezuela's government created

Bolibourgeoisie (a portmanteau of the words Bolivarian and bourgeoisie) or Bolichicos (English: Boliboys) are terms describing the new bourgeois created by the Venezuelan government of Hugo Chávez and Chavismo, made up of people who became rich under the Chávez administration. The term was coined by journalist Juan Carlos Zapata to "define the oligarchy that has developed under the protection of the Chávez government".

Corruption among the bolibourgeoisie and Chávez-administration sympathizers has moved billions of dollars with the complicity of public officials, with some becoming rich under the guise of socialism. Henry Ramos Allup, a leader of the opposition party Democratic Action, has said corruption in the financial industry and other sectors of Venezuela is tied to government officials of the Chávez administration. Following the death of Chávez, the bolibourgeoisie became more powerful and held more influence over Venezuela during the presidency of Nicolás Maduro. Many figures of the bolibourgeoisie were included in the Panama Papers scandal.

== Background ==
When President Chávez attained power in Venezuela, he faced opposition from the traditional elite within the country. Chávez created a new elite with access to dollars, which led to the establishment of a new wealthy class. During Chávez's tenure, he seized thousands of properties and businesses while also reducing the footprint of foreign companies. Venezuela's economy was then largely state-run and was operated by military officers that had their business and government affairs connected.

Senior fellow at the Brookings Institution, Harold Trinkunas, stated that involving the military in business was "a danger", with Trinkunas explaining that the Venezuelan military "has the greatest ability to coerce people, into business like they have". According to Bloomberg Business, "[b]y showering contracts on former military officials and pro-government business executives, Chávez put a new face on the system of patronage".

=== Government officials ===
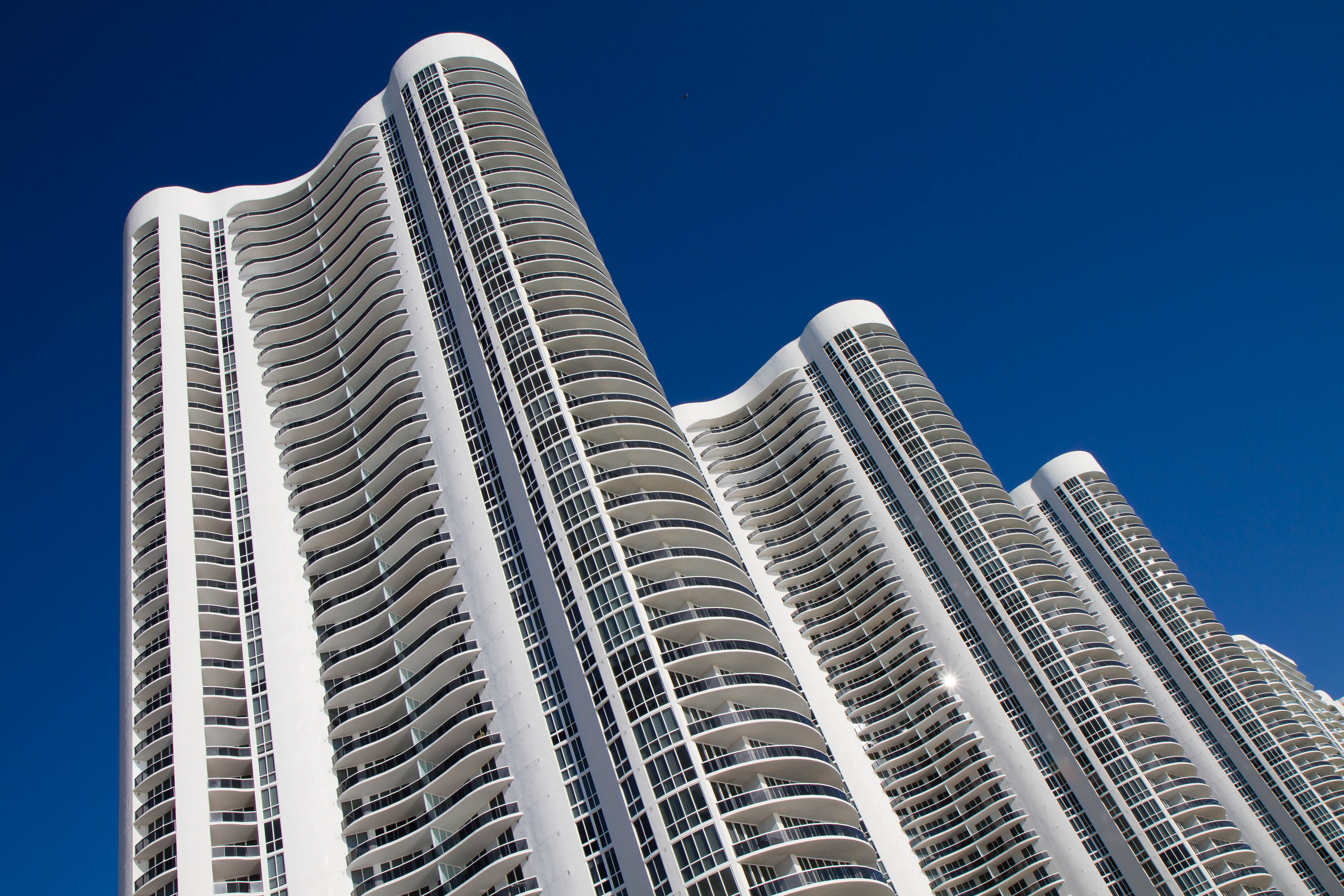
Trump Towers in Sunny Isles Beach, Florida where relatives of the National Superintendent of Securities own a condominium

Alejandro Andrade, who was appointed Minister of Finance by President Chávez, owned a private Learjet 45 worth $10 million that was registered in Delaware. He had invested in horses for show jumping, having a horse farm attributed to Andrade's firm in South Carolina. Alejandro's son, Emanuel Andrade, was also sponsored by his father and is a decorated show jumping jockey and owned multiple horses that are worth up to millions of dollars and studs that can earn profits from breeding. Andrade also hired a public relations firm, Starting Gate Communications, an organization that specializes in equestrian activities for his son.

The brother of the United Socialist Party of Venezuela (PSUV) politician Jesse Chacón, Arné Chacón, established a stable in Florida called Gadu Racing Stable Corp. and had horses compete in races in the United States until he was arrested in 2009. Brother of Ronald Sanchez the National Superintendent of Securities of Venezuela, Tomás Sánchez had a second stable, Rontos Racing Stable Corp., created that was signed by the same Gadu agent two months later. Ronald Sanchez was also accused of being involved in an extortion scandal in Miami by Venezuelan banker Thomas Vasquez in a testimony involving the case. The Rontos Racing Stable Corp. also own an apartment in the Trump Towers Miami building that was quoted at $625,000 in 2011.

=== Business executives ===
Ricardo Fernández Barrueco was a "modest business entrepreneur" in Caracas until he helped Chávez circumvent oil strikes initiated in 2002. In less than ten years, he had gained a net worth of $1.6 billion and created a combination of about 70 companies. He owned businesses in Panama, Ecuador and the United States and bought multiple financial institutions in 2008. In Miami, Fernandez bought a luxury apartment in the Jade at Brickell Bay, a home to many celebrities. In late 2009, Fernandez was arrested in Venezuela for unknown reasons and his companies were nationalized by President Chávez. He was released from prison in May 2014.

=== Chávez family ===
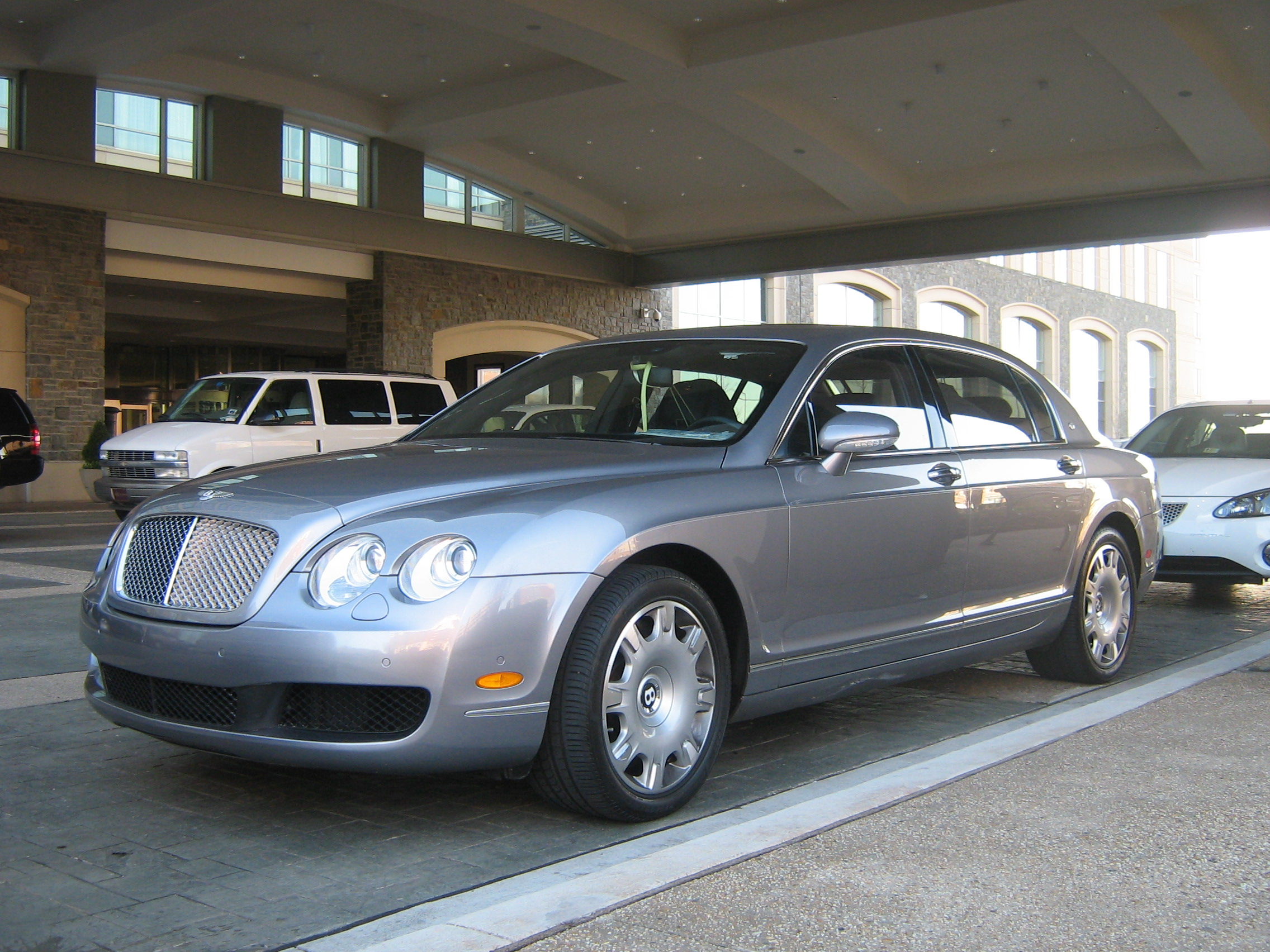
A Bentley Continental Flying Spur similar to Chávez's

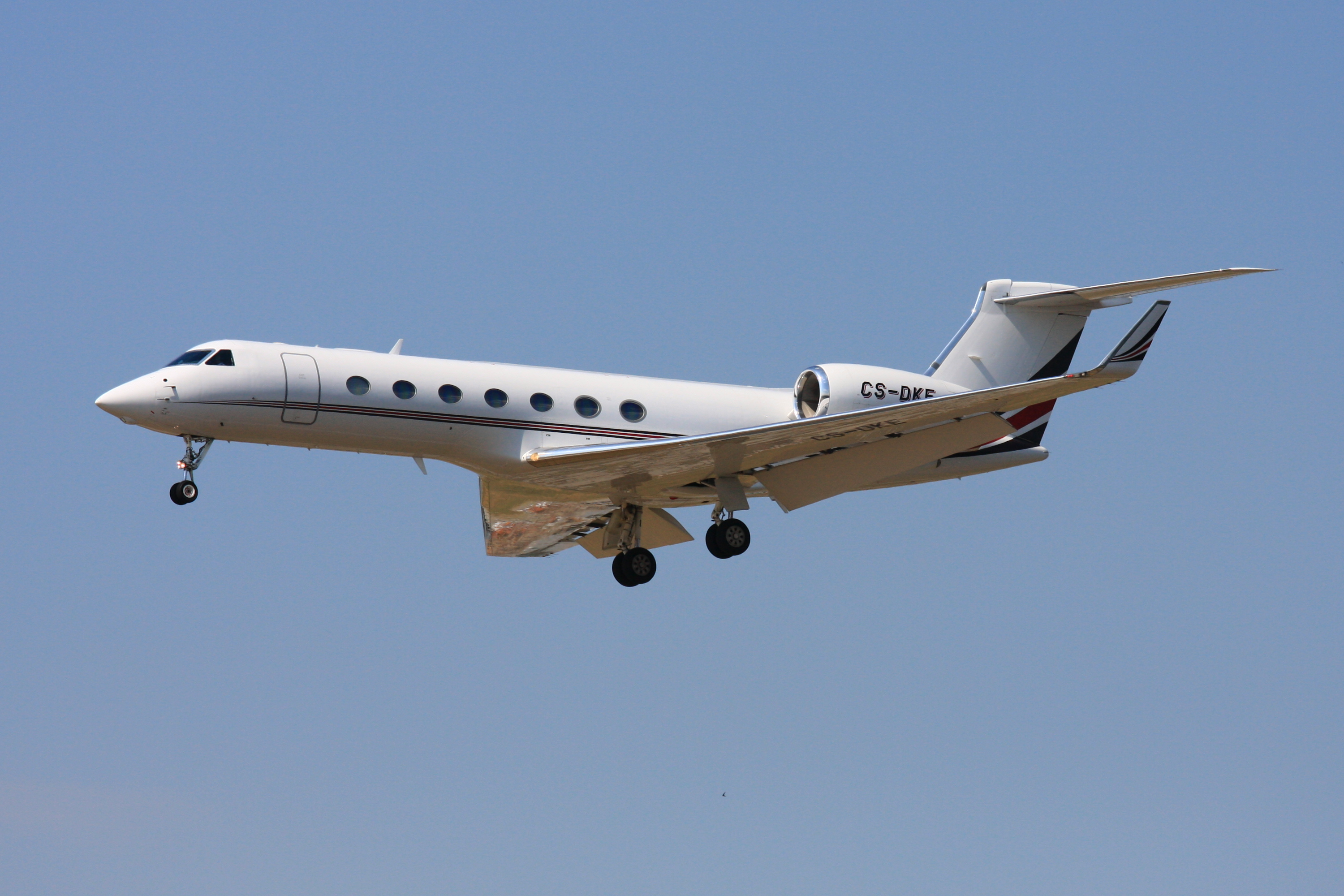
A Gulfstream G550 similar to one used by the Chávez family

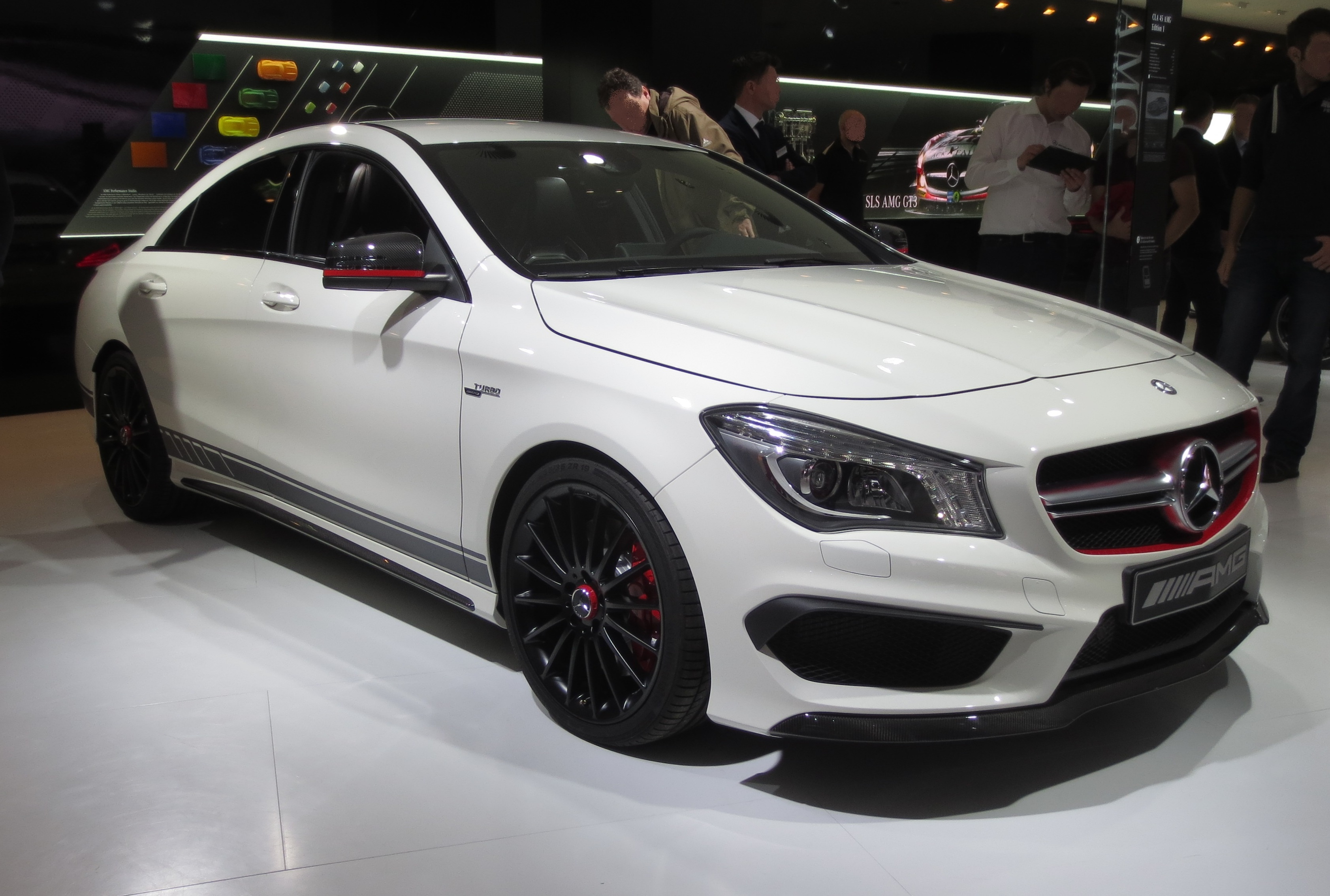
Mercedes-Benz vehicles such as this are used by the Chávez, Maduro and Flores family.

While Chávez was President, he stayed in the most expensive locations, with hundreds of individuals composing his entourage that included masseuses, chefs, tailors and Cuban doctors. Chávez and his family also wore designer clothes along with high-end fashion accessories and jewelry, with brand names including Cartier, Dolce & Gabbana and Patek Philippe & Co. among others. The daughters of Chávez have been seen with celebrities such as Justin Bieber, traveling internationally visiting places such as Disneyland Paris, New York City and Patagonia while also attending concerts of Madonna.

Members of the Chávez family live in a suburb of Barinas, Chávez's birthplace, occupying a mansion that is enclosed off from the public by walls topped with razor wire. Asdrubal Chávez, Chávez's cousin, is vice president of production and trade of PDVSA and is in charge of the majority of oil contracts. Chávez's brothers also hold positions in the Venezuelan government. Argenisis is the president of the state-run energy company CORPOELEC and Hannibal is the mayor of Sabaneta. In 2004, the Drug Enforcement Administration estimates showed that the family was possibly worth $140 million. In 2013, it was estimated that the Chávez family had liquid assets of about $550 million in multiple international bank accounts.

Though Chávez denounced hypocritical socialists and criticized those who bought luxury vehicles such as Hummers, he and his family acquired multiple vehicles during his presidency, including aircraft such as the Bombardier Challenger 605 and Gulfstream G550 and automobiles like the Bentley Mulsanne and Chevrolet LUV D-Max as well as multiple Hummers and Mercedes-Benz vehicles.

It is estimated that the Chávez family owns 17 estates totaling more than 100,000 acres. Each estate cost between $400,000 and $700,000, with the estates having their own roads. According to state legislator and Chávez critic Wilmer Azuaje, members of Chávez's family live in mansions in Alto Barinas and children of the family have their own waiting staff in their school's dining hall.

=== Maduro and Flores families ===
The families of President Nicolás Maduro and his wife Cilia Flores have benefitted from supporting the Bolivarian government. Flores has been accused of nepotism with individuals claiming that several of her close relatives became employees of the National Assembly while she was in office.

Two nephews of Cilia Flores, Efraín Antonio Campos Flores and Francisco Flores de Freites, have also been involved in illicit activities such as drug trafficking, with some of their funds possibly assisting President Maduro's presidential campaign in the 2013 Venezuelan presidential election and potentially for the 2015 Venezuelan parliamentary elections. One informant stated that the two would often fly out of Terminal 4 of Simon Bolivar Airport, a terminal reserved for the President. Walter Jacobo Gavidia Flores, Flores' son who is a Caracas judge, is being investigated for relations to drug trafficking as well.

Carlos Aem Flores, a relative of Flores, has also been linked to her two nephews involved in drug trafficking. Carlos Aem Flores, a self-described "producer", has been seen at various government facilities "working" close to Bolivarian officials such as President Maduro and the National Assembly. He has been seen sporting luxury brands of Cartier, Hublot, Louis Vuitton and Rolex and driving a special Transformers edition Chevrolet Camaro, a Ferrari F430, a Mercedes-AMG and a Porsche 911 GT2.

According to journalist Maibort Petit, Flores' son, Walter Jacob Gavidia Flores, whose last salary through 2015 was less than $1,000, made multiple international trips in 2015 and 2016 on private flights costing approximately $20,000 per trip. Gavidia Flores spent most of his time in the United States, though he also took chartered flights to France, Germany, Malta and Spain.

On 14 March 2015 at the wedding of Jose Zalt, a Syrian-Venezuelan businessman that owns the clothing brand Wintex, Maduro's son Nicolás Ernesto Maduro Guerra was seen being showered with American dollars at the gathering in the luxurious Gran Melia Hotel in Caracas. The incident caused outrage among Venezuelans who believed this to be hypocritical of President Maduro, especially since many Venezuelans were experiencing hardships due to the poor state of the economy and due to the President's public denouncements of capitalism.

In March 2017, Runrunes reported that Citgo, a subsidiary of Venezuela's PDVSA, was loaned money to purchase two private aircraft for a total of $119 million. This occurred days after President Maduro called for assistance from the United Nations, asking for help to combat medicine shortages. The first aircraft, a Bombardier Global 6000 costing $54 million, would be used by Venezuela's Minister of Energy and Mines Nelson Martínez while the second aircraft, a Bombardier Global 8000 costing $65 million, would be used by President Maduro after its development was finalized. CITGO would then deliver its Dassault Falcon 2000 to be used by Maduro as well after receiving the Global 6000.

== International lifestyle ==
The bolibourgeoisie have enjoyed financial and entertainment benefits in Miami, Nicaragua, Panama and Spain. Following investigations surrounding their acts of corruption, they have begun to move their assets to Turkey and the United Arab Emirates.

In Florida, bolibourgeois are favored clients of real estate businesses, private jet companies, luxury car dealers, fine horse breeders and luxury stores. According to a business owner of an electronics store at the Bal Harbour Shops of Miami Beach, the success of selling luxury electronics made of valuable metals and gems is attributed to bolibourgeois, with some buying gold iPads and gold cellular phones priced between $8,000 and $45,000.

Bolibourgeois had also bought luxury automobiles from foreign countries, including luxury Hummer SUVs and Rolls-Royce cars.

== Investigations ==
The United States and the Lima Group have led efforts to discover assets illegally acquired and held by the bolibourgeoisie.

Alejandro Andrade, who was appointed Minister of Finance by President Chávez, was accused of using public funds by opposition deputy Ismael García and was described as participating in a "network of corruption" by the United States Department of State. In March 2018, it was reported that United States authorities were investigating Andrade for money laundering and funneling Venezuelan state funds into his own interests. In November 2018, Andrade was sentenced to ten years in prison by the United States for accepting at least $1 billion in bribes and money laundering, resulting in having his assets seized. These assets included a mansion in Florida, a group of classic cars and over a dozen race horses.

Husband and wife Adrían Velásquez and Claudia Patricia Díaz Guillén were arrested in Spain in 2018 for allegedly holding over $4 billion of Venezuelan state funds in Andorra and Seychelles. Velásquez had served as a bodyguard for President Chávez while Diaz Guillén was the successor of Andrade serving as Minister of Finance.

Raúl Gorrín, who acquired Venezuelan media company Globovisión and turned it into a pro-Maduro network, was indicted for money laundering and bribery in November 2018.

The scandal known as the Maletinazo also generated criticism in which the government of Chávez was alleged to be sending state oil money from PDVSA to finance the political campaign of former president Cristina Fernández de Kirchner of Argentina.

On 12 May 2022, Claudia Patricia Díaz Guillén was extradited from Spain to South Florida to face charges of accepting millions in bribes from a billionaire businessman.

== See also ==
- Corruption in Venezuela
- Economic policy of the Hugo Chávez government
- History of Venezuela (1999–present)

General:

- Blanquism
- Kleptocracy
- Lumpenbourgeoisie
- Nomenklatura
- Redwashing
- Russian oligarch
- Princelings in China
- Mazhory in Soviet Union and Russia
- Songbun in North Korea
