= Equestrian at the 2019 Pan American Games – Qualification =

The following is the qualification system and list of qualified nations for the Equestrian at the 2019 Pan American Games competition.

== Qualification system ==
A quota of 150 equestrian riders (48 dressage, 48 eventing and 54 show jumping) will be allowed to qualify. A maximum of 12 athletes can compete for a nation across all events (with a maximum of four per discipline). Athletes qualified through various qualifying events and rankings.

If a country does not qualify a team in eventing, it may enter a maximum of two individuals per discipline. A team can be made up of three of four athletes, meaning if reallocation does occur, countries with individuals can qualify teams, respecting the maximum number of teams allowed to compete in each discipline.

== Qualification summary ==
A total of 21 NOC's qualified athletes.

Nation	Individual			Team			Total
Nation	Dressage	Eventing	Jumping	Dressage	Eventing	Jumping	Total
Argentina	4	4	4	X	X	X	12
Barbados	1	2					3
Bolivia			1				1
Brazil	4	4	4	X	X	X	12
Canada	4	4	4	X	X	X	12
Chile	4	4	4	X	X	X	12
Costa Rica	2						2
Colombia	4	4	4	X	X	X	12
Dominican Republic	4		4	X		X	8
Ecuador	1	2	2				5
El Salvador		1					1
Guatemala	4	4	4	X	X	X	12
Honduras	1	1					2
Mexico	4	4	4	X	X	X	12
Panama			1				1
Paraguay			1				1
Peru	4	4	4	X	X	X	12
Puerto Rico			1				1
United States	4	4	4	X	X	X	12
Uruguay	2	4	4		X	X	10
Venezuela	1	1	4			X	6
Total: 21 NOCs	48	47	54	10	10	12	150

== Qualification timeline ==
Events	Date	Venue
2018 Central American and Caribbean Games	July 20–31, 2018	(Colombia) Barranquilla
2018 South American Qualifier	November 21–25, 2018	(Argentina) Buenos Aires
North American Dressage/Eventing/Jumping rankings	March 31, 2019	—N/a
FEI Dressage/Eventing/Jumping rankings	March 31, 2019	—N/a

== Dressage ==
A total of ten teams of 4 (or 3) athletes each will qualify, along with 8 individuals who will qualify for a total of 48 athletes.

=== Team ===
Event	Vacancies	Qualified
Host Nation	1	Peru
2018 Central American and Caribbean Games	4	Mexico; Guatemala; Dominican Republic; Colombia
2018 South American Qualifier	3	Brazil; Argentina; Chile
North American Ranking	2	United States; Canada
TOTAL	10	

- The Dominican Republic and Colombia only entered a team of three athletes at the 2018 Central American and Caribbean Games.

=== Individual ===
Event	Vacancies	Qualified
2018 Central American and Caribbean Games	4	Barbados; Venezuela; Costa Rica; Costa Rica
2018 South American Qualifier	~~3~~ 2	Uruguay; Uruguay
North American Ranking	~~1~~ 0	~~Bermuda~~
Reallocation	~~1~~ 2	Ecuador; Honduras
TOTAL	8	

- Only four nations took part in the South American Qualifier. As three countries qualified teams to the Pan Am Games, only Uruguay qualified the limit of two individual athletes. The last spot was vacant and will be distributed by the FEI World Eventing Ranking.

== Eventing ==
A total of ten teams of 4 (or 3) athletes each will qualify, along with 8 individuals will qualify for a total of 48 athletes.

=== Team ===
Event	Vacancies	Qualified
Host Nation	1	Peru
2018 Central American and Caribbean Games	~~4~~ 3	Mexico; Guatemala; ~~Barbados~~; ~~Costa Rica~~; Colombia
2018 South American Qualifier	3	Argentina; Chile; Brazil
North American Ranking	2	United States; Canada
Reallocation	1	Uruguay
TOTAL	10	

=== Individual ===
Event	Vacancies	Qualified
2018 Central American and Caribbean Games	~~3~~ 2	El Salvador; Honduras; ~~Honduras~~
2018 South American Qualifier	~~3~~ 0	~~Uruguay~~; ~~Uruguay~~
FEI World Eventing Ranking	~~2~~ 5	~~Colombia~~; ~~Colombia~~; Ecuador; Venezuela; Barbados; Barbados; Ecuador
TOTAL	7	

- Only four nations took part in the South American Qualifier. As three countries qualified teams to the Pan Am Games, only Uruguay qualified the limit of two individual athletes. Uruguay has later reallocated a team quota, meaning zero individual quotas were awarded at the South American Qualifier.
- Colombia's quotas were reallocated as the country later qualified a team.
- One spot remains open

== Jumping ==
A total of 12 teams of 4 (or 3) athletes each will qualify, along with 6 individuals will qualify for a total of 54 athletes.

=== Team ===
Event	Vacancies	Qualified
Host Nation	1	Peru
2018 Central American and Caribbean Games	5	Mexico; Colombia; Guatemala; Dominican Republic; ~~Puerto Rico~~; Venezuela
2018 South American Qualifier	4	Argentina; Brazil; Chile; Uruguay
North American Ranking	2	United States; Canada
TOTAL	12	

=== Individual ===
Event	Vacancies	Qualified
2018 Central American and Caribbean Games	2	~~Venezuela~~; ~~Venezuela~~; Panama; Puerto Rico
2018 South American Qualifier	2	Ecuador; Ecuador
FEI World Jumping Ranking	2	Bolivia; Paraguay
TOTAL	8	

- Venezuela qualified a team, and its two individual quotas were reallocated.
