= Pablo Barrios =

Pablo Barrios may refer to:

- Pablo Barrios (equestrian) (born 1964), Venezuelan equestrian
- Pablo Barrios (footballer) (born 2003), Spanish footballer
