= Jorge Toledo =

Jorge Toledo may refer to:

- Jorge Toledo Albiñana (born 1964), Spanish diplomat, EU ambassador to China since 2022
- Jorge Toledo (equestrian), Mexican equestrian, competed at the 2018 Central American and Caribbean Games
- Jorge Toledo (footballer) (born 1975), Chilean attacking midfielder
- Jorge Toledo Kohury, Venezuelan oilman, one of the Citgo Six
- Jorge Toledo Luis (born 1966), Mexican politician from Oaxaca
- Jorge Toledo Orbe (born 1970), Ecuadorian TV host, appeared alongside Flor María Palomeque on Ni en vivo ni en directo
