= Mark Watring =

Puerto Rican equestrian

Personal information
- Full name: Mark Watring
- Nationality: Puerto Rican
- Discipline: Show jumping
- Born: May 2, 1963 (age 63); Aguadilla, Puerto Rico
Medal record
Equestrian
Representing Puerto Rico
Pan American Games
Gold medal – first place	2003 Santo Domingo	Individual jumping
Central American and Caribbean Games
Gold medal – first place	2002 San Salvador	Jumping individual
Gold medal – first place	2002 San Salvador	Jumping speed
Gold medal – first place	2006 Cartagena	Jumping individual
Gold medal – first place	2006 Cartagena	Jumping speed
Silver medal – second place	2002 San Salvador	Jumping
Silver medal – second place	2006 Cartagena	Jumping
Bronze medal – third place	2010 Mayagüez	Team jumping

Mark Watring (born May 2, 1963), is a Puerto Rican equestrian who in 2003, won a gold medal in the Pan American Games.

== Early years ==
Watring was born in Aguadilla, Puerto Rico, where he was raised. Watring's father was a soldier stationed at Ramey Air Force Base in Aguadilla. It was there that his father and mother met and were later married. He learned at a young age how to ride horses and did not know that someday he would represent Puerto Rico in the Olympics.

== Equestrian competitions ==
In 1984, Watring qualified and participated at the Olympic Games in Los Angeles, California in eventing. In 2001, Watring was named the American Grand Prix Association's (AGA) "Rookie of the Year". On May 27, 2002 Watring won the $35,000 Lexus of Glendale Memorial Grand Prix prize money, at the Memorial Day Classic Horse Show aboard his horse "Sapphire". Watring bested a field of 25 starters with a double clear rounds and the fastest time in the jump off of 41.176 seconds. This win moved Watring and his mount "Sapphire", into fourth place standing for "AGA Rider" and "Horse of the Year".

== 2004 Olympic Games ==
On August 16, 2003 Watring represented the United States in the Pan American Games celebrated in the Dominican Republic. The United States won the Gold Medal with a final total of 13.66 penalties compared to the 21.87 posted by Mexico. When presented the Gold Medal, Watring unfurled and waved the Puerto Rican Flag. This win secured a berth in the 2004 Olympic Games in Athens, Greece.

On February 15, 2004, Watring and his mount "Sapphire" came in third place in the Bayer/USET Grand Prix, Indio Desert circuit III. He won $9,700 in prize money. Watring participated and represented Puerto Rico in the showjumping event in the 2004 Olympic Games.

== Later years ==
Watring currently rides and trains in Southern California where he also teaches both children and adults. His wife Jenny is the captain of the Foxfield Drill team. The team rides without bridles or saddles. The Drill Team did an exhibition in the 1984 Olympic Games and continues to do exhibitions all over the country, including in Madison Square Garden. In 2008, Watring announced that he planned in cloning his horse "Sapphire". If his venture to clone Sapphire is successful, it will be the first cloned show jumper born in the United States. "

== Monies won ==
Total Money Won:

- 2004 AGA Series $1,050
- 2004 Adjusted AGA Serties $4,400
- 2002/2003 AGA Season $19,620
- 2001/2002 AGA Tour $13,000

== See also ==
- List of Puerto Ricans
- German immigration to Puerto Rico
