= Roberta Foster =

Barbadian dressage rider

Personal information
- Born: 10 September 1961 (age 64) Christ Church, Barbados

Sport
- Sport: Equestrian
- Coached by: Jan Brons
Medal record
Equestrian
Representing Barbados
Central American and Caribbean Games
Bronze medal – third place	2023 Santo Domingo	Freestyle dressage

Roberta Foster (born 10 September 1961) is a Barbadian dressage rider. She competed at the 2019 Pan American Games in Lima where she became 11th in the finals. She competed also at the 1999 Pan American Games and is the most successful dressage rider from Barbados in history, by being the first Grand Prix rider for Barbados.

She is also chair member of the dressage department at the Barbados Equestrian Federation. In 2019 they organized for the first time in history an international equestrian show in St. Philip, which she won all classes.
