= Alejandro Andrade =

Venezuelan military officer and politician

Minister of Finance (Tesorería de la Nación)
- In office 2007–2010

President of Banfoandes
- In office 2009–2010

Personal details
- Born: 12 August 1964 (age 62) Coche, Caracas, Venezuela
- Party: PSUV
- Children: Emanuel Andrade
- Education: Military Academy of Venezuela

Alejandro Andrade (born 2 August 1964) is a former Venezuelan military officer and politician. A 1987 graduate of the Military Academy of Venezuela, he was appointed as minister of finance and president of Banfoandes under the administration of the then president, Hugo Chávez. Andrade, a member of Venezuela's boliburguesía, received a ten-year sentence in the US for money laundering in 2018.

== Early life ==
Andrade was born in the parish of Coche, located southwest of Caracas. In 1964, he graduated from the Venezuelan Academy of Military Sciences and participated in the 1992 coup d'état attempts alongside then Lieutenant Colonel Hugo Chávez. During Chávez's 1998 presidential campaign, Andrade acted as his personal bodyguard and secretary. After being elected president, Chávez appointed Andrade to be his private secretary. He was involved in numerous bureaucratic positions, all related to the finance and economical sectors since then until his relocation to the United States.

In the United States, Andrade resided in a 9,000 square feet (840 m^{2}) home on an estate in Wellington, Florida, his largest of several properties.

== Imprisonment ==
In December 2017, Andrade pleaded guilty to receiving more than a billion dollars from Raúl Gorrín, president of Globovisión channel, and others in exchange for using his position as minister of finance to adjudicate transactions in foreign exchange. On 19 February 2019, he was sentenced to ten years in prison for various money laundering crimes, the biggest being a $2.4 billion money scheme. Andrade surrendered to authorities in the US on 25 February 2019.
