= José Roberto Fernández Filho =

Brazilian equestrian (born 1980)

Personal information
- Born: 14 February 1980 (age 46) São Paulo, Brazil
Medal record
Equestrian
Representing Brazil
South American Games
Gold medal – first place	2022 Asuncion	Team jumping
Gold medal – first place	2022 Asuncion	Individual jumping
Gold medal – first place	2026 Santa Fe	Team jumping
Silver medal – second place	2014 Santiago	Team jumping
Bronze medal – third place	2006 Buenos Aires	Individual jumping

José Roberto Fernández Filho (born 14 February 1980) is a Brazilian equestrian. He competed in two events at the 2012 Summer Olympics.
