= Equestrian at the 2006 Central American and Caribbean Games =

- Location: Cartagena, Colombia

The Equestrian competition at the 2006 Central American and Caribbean Games was held in Cartagena, Colombia.

== Medal summary ==
=== Individual events ===
Event	Gold	Silver	Bronze
Dressage	Eduardo Muñoz (COL) 1395	Raúl Corchuelo (COL) 1329	Peter Norlander (MEX) 1326
Dressage individual final	Eduardo Muñoz (COL) 2910	Raúl Corchuelo (COL) 2844	Peter Norlander (MEX) 2830
Jumping	Carlos López (COL)	Mark Watring (PUR)	Luis Gamboa (ESA)
Jumping Individual Final	Mark Watring (PUR)	Carlos Ramírez (COL)	Francisco Pasquel (MEX)
Jumping Individual Speed	Mark Watring (PUR) 68.380 (0.0)	Alberto Michán (MEX) 69.420 (0.52)	Héctor Caro (MEX) 69.640 (0.63)

=== Team events ===
Event	Gold	Silver	Bronze
Dressage	Colombia 4,495; Constanza Jaramillo, María García, Eduardo Muñoz, Eduardo Muñoz	Mexico 4,371; Héctor Caro, José Padilla, Bernardette Pujals, Omar Zayrik	Guatemala 4,337; Christa Dauber, Silva Luna, Juan Andrés Rodríguez, Silvia Roesch
Jumping	Mexico 14.39; Alberto Michán, Héctor Caro, Andrés Gómez, Francisco Pasquel	Guatemala 19.28; Juan Pivaral, Juan Andrés Rodríguez, Eduardo Castillo, Álvaro Tejada	Colombia 21.59; Jhon Pérez, Carlos López, Ricardo Villa, Carlos Ramírez
