= Equestrian at the 2002 Central American and Caribbean Games =

The Equestrian competition at the 2002 Central American and Caribbean Games was held in San Salvador, El Salvador.

== Medal summary ==
=== Individual events ===
Event	Gold	Silver	Bronze
Dressage	Yvonne Losos (DOM) 1348	Joaquin Orth (MEX) 1332	Bernadette Pujals (MEX) 1325
Dressage individual final	Yvonne Losos (DOM) 2677	Joaquin Orth (MEX) 2656	Bernadette Pujals (MEX) 2647
Eventing	Jaime Velásquez (MEX)	Erik Arámbula (MEX)	Miguel Sarmiento (MEX)
Jumping	Eugenio Enriquez (MEX)	Mark Watring (PUR)	Rodrigo Díaz (COL)
Jumping Individual Final	Mark Watring (PUR)	Enrique González (MEX)	Carlos Ramírez (COL)
Jumping Individual Speed	Mark Watring (PUR) 83.88 (0.0)	María Pivaral (GUA) 84.49 (0.31)	Salvador Fernández (MEX) 86.65 (1.39)
Endurance	Oscar Delgado (CRC)	Alfredo Peralta (CRC)	Federico Herbruger (GUA)

=== Team events ===
Event	Gold	Silver	Bronze
Dressage	Mexico 3,939; Salvador Oñate, Joaquín Orth, Bernadette Pujals, Omar Zayrik	Colombia 3,877; Constanza Jaramillo, Tatiana Londoño, Eduardo Muñoz, César Parra	Dominican Republic 3,802; Vanessa Doyle, George Fernández, Yvonne Losos de Muñiz, Diana Ramos
Eventing	Mexico 175.75; Erick Arámbula, Aaron Minor, Aurelio Quinzaños, Jaime Velásquez	Guatemala 216.25; Alfredo Aycinema, Ricardo Cordón, José Sánchez, Carlos Sueiras	El Salvador 320.25; Carmen Barrera, José Romano, Eider Sánchez, Juan Vásquez
Jumping	Colombia 37.07; Rodrigo Díaz, Carlos Ramírez, Ricardo Villa, Andrés Muller	Mexico 45.31; Eugenio Enríquez, Enrique González, Salvador Fernández, Arturo Hernández	Guatemala 61.20; Juan Pivaral, María Pivaral, Eduardo Castillo, Luis Sáenz
Endurance	Guatemala; Federico Herbruger, Roberto Hernández, Jaime Mansilla, Gilberto Pirir	Costa Rica; Oscar Delgado, Alfredo Peralta, Ignacio Esquivel, Luis Quirós	Dominican Republic; Nidia Gómez, Arnaldo Gómez, Eric Pimentel, Nelson Vargas
