= Laura Graves =

American equestrian

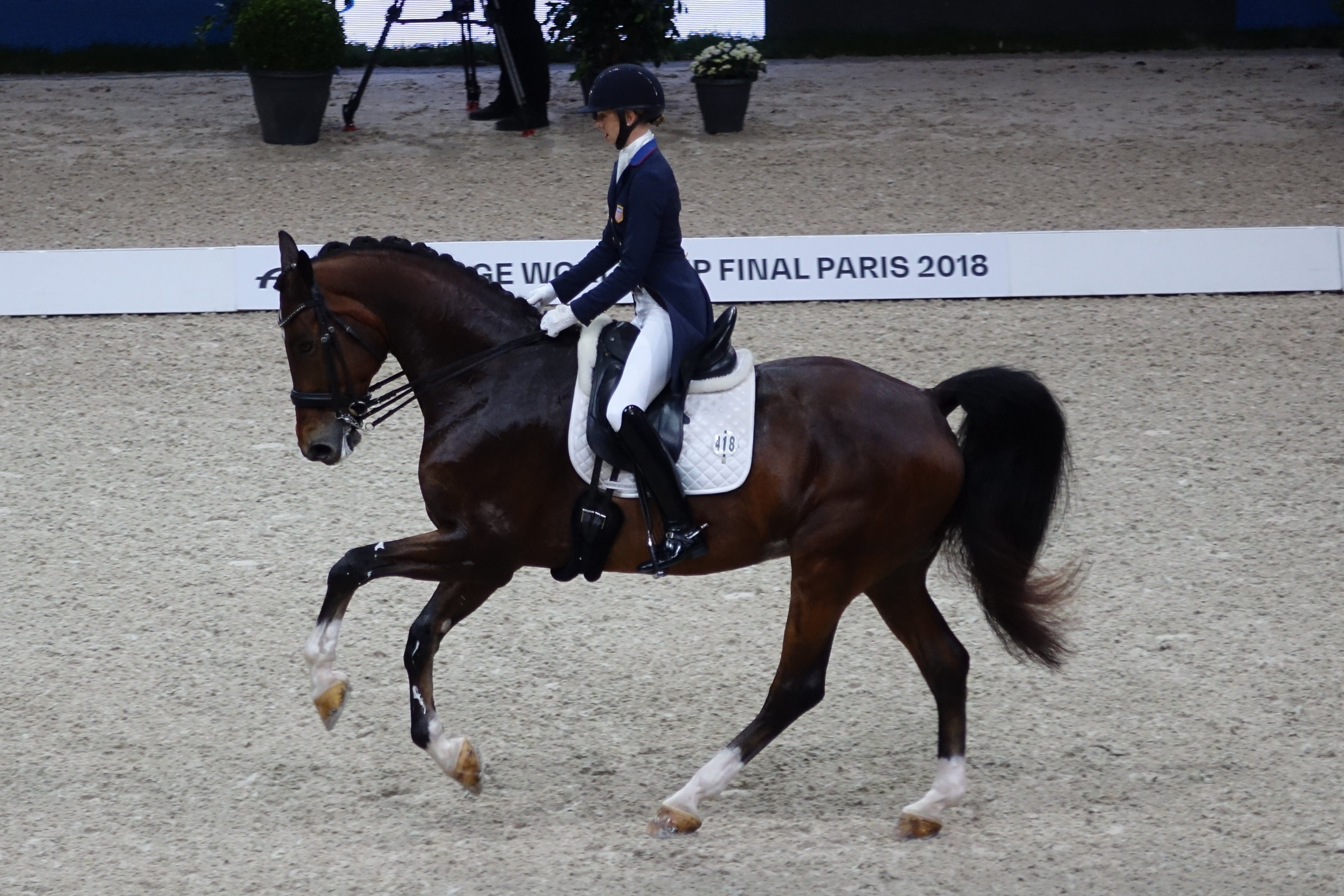
- Laura Graves and Verdades (2018)

Personal information
- Born: July 22, 1987 (age 38) Burlington, Vermont, United States
Medal record
Equestrian
Representing United States
Olympic Games
Bronze medal – third place	2016 Rio de Janeiro	Team dressage
World Championships
Silver medal – second place	2018 Tryon	Team dressage
Silver medal – second place	2018 Tryon	Special dressage
World Cup
Silver medal – second place	2017 Omaha	Individual dressage
Silver medal – second place	2018 Paris	Individual dressage
Silver medal – second place	2019 Gothenburg	Individual dressage
Pan American Games
Gold medal – first place	2015 Toronto	Team dressage
Silver medal – second place	2015 Toronto	Individual dressage

Laura Graves (born July 22, 1987) is an American dressage rider. She represented the United States at the 2016 Summer Olympics where she won a bronze medal in the team dressage competition. After winning double silver medals at the 2018 World Equestrian Games in Tryon, NC, Laura became the first American dressage rider to be ranked No. 1 in FEI World rankings, aboard her longtime partner Verdades.

== Dressage career ==
Growing up in Vermont, Graves rode her first pony at an early age when a family friend boarded two ponies at the Graves' farm. Laura and her sisters got attached to the ponies, which persuaded their parents to trade a washing machine and a tumble-dryer in order to keep them. At the age of 15, Laura (along with her mother) bought a foal named Verdades from the Netherlands, a horse that eventually became her Olympic partner. Verdades, however, proved difficult at his early age. In 2009, Graves suffered a broken back after he threw her from the saddle. Following the setbacks, she decided to focus on her cosmetology studies and sell the horse.

After briefly working in Boston, Graves decided to move to Florida and continued pursuing her career as a dressage rider after not being able to sell Verdades because of his opinionated spirit.

Graves and Verdades started competing at the international Grand Prix level in 2014. At the American Dressage Championships, held in Gladstone, New Jersey, they placed 2nd overall and qualified directly for the 2014 World Equestrian Games. In the build-up towards the World Equestrian Games, Graves and Verdades competed at the CHIO Aachen 5* event, placing 10th in the freestyle final. At the World Games, held in Normandy, France, they finished 5th in the team, 5th in the special, and 5th in the freestyle competitions.

Graves opened the 2015 dressage season with FEI World Cup Finals in Las Vegas, Nevada, where she finished 4th, narrowly missing a podium finish. Later that year, she competed at the Pan American Games, which were held in Toronto, Ontario, Canada. She won a gold medal in the team and a silver medal in the individual dressage competition, behind her teammate Steffen Peters.

In 2016, Graves competed at her first Summer Olympics in Rio de Janeiro, Brazil. She won a bronze medal in the team competition and earned 4th position individually.

Following year, Graves and Verdades qualified to compete at the 2017 World Cup Finals in Omaha. She finished in a runner-up position, behind Isabell Werth, and thus won her first individual medal.

In 2018, Graves successfully defended her World Cup Finals silver medal at the competition held in Paris, France. Later that year, she became the first American dressage rider to be ranked No. 1 in FEI World rankings after the World Equestrian Games in Tryon, NC.

Graves started the 2019 season at the Global Dressage Festival in Wellington, Florida, during which she qualified for the 2019 World Cup Finals. At the Finals, which were held in Gothenburg in April, she finished in a runner-up position for the third consecutive edition. On each occasion, she was pipped for the top spot by her great rival Isabell Werth.

== Verdades ==
Verdades is a 2002 KWPN Bay Gelding (Florett As x Lilwilarda by Goya) bred by the late Peter Jan (Piet) Crum of Herveld in Holland. Verdades’ sire, Florett As, was a Westphalian-based stallion. As a young horse, he was quite precocious and finished third overall in his stallion test and won the dressage portion. Later he placed third at the Bundeschampionate in Germany in dressage. He stood in both Holland and Germany at different times, but was not utilized heavily for breeding. Considering his smaller breeding record, Florett As has a good record for producing Grand Prix horses".

Through the dam, "through Liwilarda, we see the influence of the Dutch Harness Horse in Verdades’ pedigree. Dutch Harness Horses are carriage horses with high knee action, developed some generations back with influence from the Gelders Horse.” The Gelders Horse is a heavier warmblood type originally bred for both versatility and style: these horses needed the strength and stamina to work farms but also enough refinement and action to be stylish carriage horses. Fessenden says it’s not at all unusual for Gelders to influence the breeding of modern Dutch Warmbloods, but it is somewhat exceptional to have this much Harness Horse influence so close in the pedigree of an Olympic dressage horse."

In September 2018 Breyer Horses, part of Reeves International (a toy company), released a Traditional (1:9) commemorative horse in Verdades honor. Verdades is a fan favorite, USEF International Horse of Honor, US Dressage national champion, Pan American Games Dressage Gold medalist, and was called “the heart of the sport in America” by the Horse Star Hall of Fame.

== Personal life ==
Laura Graves grew up in Vermont on a family farm. She is the daughter of Ronald and Patricia Graves and has two sisters, Eliza and Lindsey. Graves' parents purchased Verdades for her when her first horse, Sunny, was retired from competition.

At just 11 years old, she buried a clay model of the Olympic rings inside her fifth-grade time capsule in hopes that she'd make it to the sports world's biggest stage one day. Laura graduated from Harwood Union High School (Duxbury, Vt.) in 2004 and went on to cosmetology school.
