= Equestrian at the 2010 Central American and Caribbean Games =

Event held in Mayagüez, Puerto Rico

- Venue: La Sebastina
- Location: Mayaguez
- Dates: 21-30 July

The Equestrian competition at the 2010 Central American and Caribbean Games was held in Mayagüez, Puerto Rico.

The tournament was scheduled to be held from 21–30 July at the La Sebastina in Bayamón.

== Medal summary ==
=== Individual events ===
Event	Gold	Silver	Bronze
Dressage	Marco Bernal (COL)	Yvonne Losos (DOM)	Antonio Riverea (MEX)
Eventing	Tiziana Billy (GUA)	Erik Arambula (MEX)	Sarka Kolackova (GUA)
Jumping	Pablo Barrios (VEN)	Andres Rodriguez (VEN)	Rodrigo Diaz (COL)

=== Team events ===
Event	Gold	Silver	Bronze
Dressage	Colombia	Guatemala	Mexico
Eventing	Mexico	Colombia	Venezuela
Jumping	Venezuela	Mexico	Puerto Rico
