= Equestrian at the 2023 Central American and Caribbean Games =

- Venue: Centro Ecuestre Palmarejo
- Location: (Dominican Republic) Santo Domingo
- Dates: 24 June – 4 July

The equestrian competition at the 2023 Central American and Caribbean Games was held in Santo Domingo, Dominican Republic from 24 June to 4 July at the Centro Ecuestre Palmarejo.

== Medal table ==
* Host nation (El Salvador)

Rank	Nation	Gold	Silver	Bronze	Total
1	Dominican Republic (DOM)	2	0	1	3
2	El Salvador (ESA)*	2	0	0	2
3	Colombia (COL)	1	4	0	5
4	Mexico (MEX)	1	3	3	7
5	Panama (PAN)	1	1	0	2
6	Puerto Rico (PUR)	1	0	0	1
7	Venezuela (VEN)	0	0	2	2
8	Barbados (BAR)	0	0	1	1
8	Costa Rica (CRC)	0	0	1	1
Totals (9 entries)		8	8	8	24

== Medal summary ==
=== Dressage ===
Event	Gold	Silver	Bronze
Individual	Yvonne Losos de Muñiz on Idwinaretto; Dominican Republic	Juliana Gutiérrez on Flanissimo; Colombia	Roberta Foster on Chichic; Barbados
Overall	Yvonne Losos de Muñiz on Idwinaretto; Dominican Republic	Juliana Gutiérrez on Flanissimo; Colombia	Carlos Maldonado on Frans; Mexico
Team	Colombia (COL); Mariana Atehortua on Justify AS; Juliana Gutiérrez on Flanissimo; Andrea Vargas on Homerus P Raul Corchuelo on Maverick	Mexico (MEX); Carlos Maldonado on Frans; Marcos Ortiz on Dagasus; Jose Padilla on Twan Van Plexat; Antonio Rivera on Fite	Costa Rica (CRC); Olger Gomez on Zarcero AG; Sergio Quesada on Tango AG; Ronald Masis on Zar AG; Gloriana Herrera on Vampiro de Pereto

=== Eventing ===
Event	Gold	Silver	Bronze
Individual	Lauren Shady on Can Be Sweet; Puerto Rico	Luis Ariel Santiago on Egipcio II; Mexico	Fernando Parroquín on Beldad; Mexico

=== Jumping ===
Event	Gold	Silver	Bronze
Individual	Juan Manuel Bolanos (ESA) on Zilouet Mystic Rose	Alberto Sanchez-Cozar (MEX) on Abril Hilcha Z	Luis Fernando Larrazabal (VEN) on Condara
Individual Speed	Victoria Heurtematte on Scarlett du Sart Z Panama	Camilo Rueda on Indus van het Keysereyck; Colombia	Maria Gabriela Brugal on J'adore Flamenco; Dominican Republic
Individual Overall	Juan Manuel Bolanos (ESA) on Zilouet Mystic Rose	Victoria Heurtematte on Scarlett du Sart Z Panama	Alberto Sanchez-Cozar (MEX) on Abril Hilcha Z
Team	Mexico (MEX); Carlos Molina on Eavantus C Juan Carlos Martin on La Costa; Jorge Canedo on Jacks O Alberto Sanchrz-Cozar on Abril Hilcha Z	Colombia (COL); Jorge Barrera on Explosive TV; Joseph Bluman on Diabolo de San Isidro; Camilo Rueda on Indus van het Keysereyck; Juan Manuel Gallego on Conbago	Venezuela (VEN); Juan Ortiz on Odiel vdm Michelle El Masri on Chaplin; Pablo Barrios on Igor Chavannais; Luis Fernando Larrazabal on Condara

== Ground Jury ==
The Ground Jury during the 2023 Central American and Caribbean Games is nominated as follows;

Ground jury panel for the Dressage

- (Peru) Marian Cunningham (Ground Jury President)
- (Brazil) Claudia Moreira de Mesquita (Ground Jury Member)
- (United States) Jane Weatherwax (Ground Jury Member)
- (Argentina) Cesar Lopardo Grana (Ground Jury Member)
- (Portugal) Carlos Lopes (Technical Delegate)

Ground jury panel for the Jumping

- (Canada) Colleen Hoffman (Ground Jury President)
- (Colombia) Diana Faccini (Ground Jury Member)
- (Puerto Rico) Marichi Brito (Ground Jury Member)
- (Mexico) Norma Angelica Rodriguez (Ground Jury Member)
- (Costa Rica) Ana Cristina Vargas (Ground Jury Member)
- (Colombia) Javier Medrano (Technical Delegate)

Ground jury panel for the Eventing

- (France) Emmanuelle Olier (Ground Jury President)
- (Canada) Jo Young (Ground Jury Member)
- (United States) Robert Stevenson (Ground Jury Member)
- (United States) Andrew Temkin (Technical Delegate)
