= Roberto Terán =

Colombian equestrian

Personal information
- Nationality: Colombian
- Born: 28 January 1977 (age 49) Bogotá, Colombia

Sport
- Sport: Equestrian
Medal record
Equestrian
Representing Colombia
Central American and Caribbean Games
Gold medal – first place	2014 Veracruz	Individual jumping
Gold medal – first place	2014 Veracruz	Team jumping
Gold medal – first place	2026 Santo Domingo	Individual jumping
Gold medal – first place	2026 Santo Domingo	Team jumping
Silver medal – second place	2014 Veracruz	Individual speed

Roberto Terán Tafur (born 28 January 1977) is a Colombian equestrian. He competed in the individual jumping event at the 2020 Summer Olympics.
