= Martín Dopazo =

Argentine equestrian (born 1969)

Personal information
- Nationality: Argentine
- Born: 13 March 1969 (age 57)
Medal record
Equestrian
Representing Argentina
South American Games
Silver medal – second place	2006 Buenos Aires	Individual jumping
Silver medal – second place	2022 Asuncion	Team jumping
Bronze medal – third place	2014 Santiago	Team jumping

Martín Dopazo (born 13 March 1969) is an Argentine equestrian. He competed at the 2000 Summer Olympics and the 2004 Summer Olympics. He won the Platinum Konex Award in 2010 as the best equestrian of the last decade in Argentina. He also competed at the 2020 Summer Olympics.
