= Chris von Martels =

Canadian equestrian (born 1982)

Personal information
- Born: Christopher von Martels; 13 October 1982 (age 43) Chatham, Ontario, Canada
- Height: 180 cm (5 ft 11 in)

Sport
- Sport: Equestrian
- Event: Dressage
- Coached by: Nicole Werner

Achievements and titles
- Olympic finals: 2020 Olympic Games
Medal record
Equestrian
Representing Canada
Pan American Games
Silver medal – second place	2015 Toronto	Team dressage
Bronze medal – third place	2015 Toronto	Individual dressage

Chris von Martels (born 13 October 1982) is a Canadian equestrian athlete. He won team silver and individual bronze at the 2015 Pan-American Games in Toronto. Von Martels represented Canada at the 2020 Olympic Games in Tokyo, finishing 39th in the individual competition.

Von Martels was selected as the travelling alternate for the Canadian dressage team at the 2024 Summer Olympics. Just prior to the games, team rider Jill Irving and Delacroix were deemed unfit to compete, and von Martels and Eclips would start for team Canada.

== Personal life ==
Von Martels was born to a Canadian mother and a Dutch father. He is married to Lisa Kostandoff. Together they run their own equestrian business in sales and training of dressage horses in Ridgetown, Ontario and Wellington, Florida. During the summer he spend his time in the Netherlands for his equestrian business.
