= Carlos López (equestrian) =

Spanish equestrian (1926–2023)

Carlos López-Quesada Romero (27 August 1926 – 15 October 2023) was a Spanish equestrian who competed in the 1956 Summer Olympics.

López was born in Madrid on 27 August 1926, and died on 15 October 2023, at the age of 97.
