= Equestrian events at the 2022 South American Games =

Equestrian competitions at the 2022 South American Games

Equestrian at the 2022 South American Games
- Venue: Club Hípico Paraguayo
- Dates: October 2−11
- Nations: 8

Equestrian competitions at the 2022 South American Games in Asunción, Paraguay are scheduled to be held between October 2 and 11, 2022 at the Club Hípico Paraguayo

== Schedule ==
The competition schedule is as follows:

P	Preliminary	F	Final

Men
Date Event	Sun 2	Mon 3	Tue 4	Wed 5	Thu 6	Fri 7	Sat 8	Sun 9	Mon 10	Tue 11
Individual dressage	P	P		F						
Team dressage	P	F								
Individual jumping							P	P		F
Team jumping							P	F		

== Medal summary ==
=== Medal table ===
* Host nation (Paraguay)

Rank	Nation	Gold	Silver	Bronze	Total
1	Brazil (BRA)	4	2	1	7
2	Argentina (ARG)	0	2	1	3
3	Chile (CHI)	0	0	1	1
3	Uruguay (URU)	0	0	1	1
Totals (4 entries)		4	4	4	12

=== Medalists ===
Event	Gold	Silver	Bronze
Individual dressage	Paulo dos Santos on Fidel da Sasa Je; Brazil	Victor Ávila on Corsario IGS; Brazil	Vinicius da Costa on Biso das Lezirias; Brazil
Team dressage	Brazil; Vinicius da Costa on Biso das Lezirias; Murilo Machado on Jorge V.O. Paulo dos Santos on Fidel da Sada Je; Victor Ávila on Corsario IGS	Argentina; Ana Busso on Laudatio; Ingrid Berger on Floppy Disk; Maria Florencia Manfredi on Condiciado Angelique; Fiorella Mengani on Assirio d'Atela	Uruguay; Malin Moren on Hamilcar Interagro; Agustina Bravo on Sandiago; Guillermina Birenbaum on Jazzmate; Carolin Mallmann on Godot SSF
Individual jumping	José Roberto Fernández Filho on Santiago Rosebud; Brazil	Stephan Barcha on Chevaux Primavera Montana IE; Brazil	Damian Ancic on Santa Rosa Chabacaon; Argentina
Team jumping	Brazil; Stephan Barcha on Chevaux Primavera Montana IE; Geronimo Ciavaglia on GR Garuda; Guilherme Foroni on Casella Blanca Jmen; José Roberto Fernández Filho on Santiago Rosebud	Argentina; Damian Ancic on Santa Rosa Chabacaon; Nicolas Elustondo on Cooper Gypsy Eyes; Joaquin Albisu on Don Aurielo; Martín Dopazo on Pegasus Chau Amore	Chile; Alexandr Imschenetzky on Caspaccio; Ricardo Luttecke on Agua Fiesta; Gabriela Reutter on Maharees Rock; Samuel Parot on Captain Z

== Participation ==
Eight nations will participate in equestrian events of the 2022 South American Games.

- Argentina
- Bolivia
- Brazil
- Chile
- Ecuador
- Paraguay
- Peru
- Uruguay

== Results ==
=== Individual Dressage ===
Rank	Rider	Nation	Horse	PSG / GP		Int I / GPS		Int I / GPF		Total
Rank	Rider	Nation	Horse	Score	Rank	Score	Rank	Score	Rank	Total
1st place, gold medalist(s)	Paulo Cesar dos Santos	Brazil	Fidel Da Sasa Je	68.471	2	68.470	1 Q	73.150	1	210.091
2nd place, silver medalist(s)	Victor Ávila	Brazil	Corsario IGS	68.935	1	67.702	2 Q	71.410	2	208.047
3rd place, bronze medalist(s)	Vinicius Da Costa	Brazil	Biso Das Lezirias	67.029	4	66.324	6 Q	71.215	3	204.568
4	María José Granja	Ecuador	Emiliano AP	66.765	5	67.147	3 Q	70.475	4	204.387
5	Carolin Mallmann	Uruguay	Godot SSF	67.912	3	66.941	4 Q	69.315	6	204.168
6	Ingrid Berger	Argentina	Floppy Disk	66.236	6	66.412	5 Q	69.375	5	202.022
7	Murilo Machado	Brazil	Jorge V.O	64.823	9	65.853	7 Q	69.190	7	199.866
8	Fiorella Mengani	Argentina	Assirio D Atela	65.761	8	64.106	9 Q	69.130	8	198.997
9	María Florencia Manfredi	Argentina	Codiciado Angelique	64.294	10	63.382	11 Q	68.490	9	196.167
10	Guillermina Birenbaum	Uruguay	Jazzmate	64.000	12	64.647	8 Q	66.650	11	195.297
11	Malin Moren	Uruguay	Hamilcar Interagro	63.383	15	63.206	12 Q	68.310	10	194.899
12	Ana María Busso	Argentina	Laudatio	63.765	14	64.000	10 Q	64.565	12	192.330
13	Edgar Valladares	Ecuador	Dark Dancer	64.941	8	62.500	14 Q	63.740	13	191.181
14	Julio Fonseca	Chile	Clapton	63.794	13	61.970	15	Did not advance		125.765
15	Agustina Bravo	Uruguay	Sandiago	58.559	16	60.000	16	Did not advance		118.559
16	Ramona Eugster	Paraguay	Iamal	57.765	17	57.941	17	Did not advance		115.706
	Carolina Espinosa	Ecuador	Satinka	64.118	11	62.559	13 Q	RET		126.676

=== Team Dressage ===
Rank	Nation	Name	Horse	Grand Prix			Intermediate I / Grand Prix Special			Total
Rank	Nation	Name	Horse	Individual	Team	Rank	Individual	Team	Rank	Total
1st place, gold medalist(s)	Brazil	Vinicius Da Costa; Murilo Machado; Paulo Cesar Dos Santos; Victor Ávila	Biso Das Lezirias; Jorge V.O; Fidel Da Sasa Je; Corsario IGS	66.324; ~~65.853~~; 68.470; 67.702	202.496	1	67.029; ~~64.823~~; 68.471; 68.935	204.435	1	406.931
2nd place, silver medalist(s)	Argentina	Ana María Busso; Ingrid Berger; María Florencia Manfredi; Fiorella Mengani	Laudatio; Floppy Disk; Codiciado Angelique; Assirio D Atela	64.000; 66.412; ~~63.382~~; 64.106	194.518	3	~~63.765~~; 66.236; 64.294; 65.761	196.291	2	390.809
3rd place, bronze medalist(s)	Uruguay	Malin Moren; Agustina Bravo; Guillermina Birenbaum; Carolin Mallmann	Hamilcar Interagro; Sandiago; Jazzmate; Godot SSF	63.206; ~~60.000~~; 64.647; 66.941	194.794	2	63.383; ~~58.559~~; 64.000; 67.912	195.295	4	390.089
4	Ecuador	Edgar Valladares; Carolina Espinosa; María José Granja	Dark Dancer; Satinka; Emiliano AP	62.500; 62.559; 67.147	192.206	4	64.941; 64.118; 66.765	195.824	3	388.030

=== Individual Jumping ===
Rank	Rider	Nation	Horse	Qualification					Final		
Rank	Rider	Nation	Horse	1st Qualifier	2nd Qualifier	3rd Qualifier	Total	Rank	Round A	Round B	Total
1st place, gold medalist(s)	José Roberto Fernández Filho	Brazil	Santiago Rosebud	0.00	4	0	4	2 Q	0	0	4
2nd place, silver medalist(s)	Stephan Barcha	Brazil	Chevaux Primavera Montana IE	0.52	1	0	1.52	1 Q	5	0	6.52
3rd place, bronze medalist(s)	Damián Ancic	Argentina	Santa Rosa Chabacón	1.69	1	4	6.69	6 Q	0	0	6.69
4	Martín Dopazo	Argentina	Pegasus Chau Amore	0.46	4	0	4.46	3 Q	0	8	12.46
5	Gonzalo Meza	Ecuador	Larissa	2.56	4	1	7.56	7 Q	1	4	12.56
6	Carlos Bedoya	Bolivia	Quimi del Maset	4.57	0	1	5.57	5 Q	4	3	12.57
7	Geronimo Ciavaglia	Brazil	GR Garuda	1.50	4	0	5.50	4 Q	8	4	17.50
8	Alexandr Imschenetzky	Chile	Caspaccio	3.81	4	0	7.81	8 Q	8	4	19.81
9	Ricardo Luttecke	Chile	Agua Fiesta	3.44	8	0	11.44	10 Q	8	2	21.44
10	Ignacio Galeano	Paraguay	Casqero	5.93	7	13	25.93	18 Q	0		25.93
11	Gabriela Reutter	Chile	Maharees Rock	9.01	5	8	22.01	16 Q	4		26.01
12	Flavio Araujo	Brazil	Lorentino Jmen	5.10	4	5	14.10	11 Q	4	8	26.10
13	Joaquín Albisu	Argentina	Don Aurelio	3.17	4	4	11.17	9 Q	8	8	27.17
14	Andrés Lausen	Chile	RL Bianca	5.54	6	8	19.54	14 Q	8		27.54
15	Samuel Parot	Chile	Captain Z	1.65	10	4	15.65	12 Q	8	4	27.65
16	Raúl Guarino de Oliveira	Uruguay	Ata Caspita	6.92	8	12	26.92	19 Q	12		38.92
17	Martín Rodríguez	Uruguay	Dom Da Essencia	4.40	8	12	24.40	17 Q	16		40.40
18	Alejandro Madorno	Argentina	Hashtag	2.46	20	13	35.46	21 Q	8		43.46
19	Ivan Christiansen	Ecuador	Giorgia Z	9.74	22	10	41.74	22 Q	8		49.74
20	Anna Gansauer	Ecuador	Day Dream	6.76	14	8	28.76	20 Q	25		53.76
	Lupe Valente	Uruguay	Libertina Jotamen 2	13.16	28	13	54.16	23 Q	RET		
	Alessandra Battilana	Peru	Carolina	4.45	8	8	20.45	15 Q	EL		
	Juan Manuel Luzardo	Uruguay	Dalien Swally R.P.	5.78	9	3	17.78	13 Q	RET		
	Stieven Bardwin	Paraguay	Cheptel Valjean	6.17	26	EL			Did not advance		
	Rodrigo Bedoya	Bolivia	Lancaster LV V'T Diepenbr	5.89	EL				Did not advance		
	Nicolás Elustondo	Argentina	Cooper Gypsy Eyes	5.59	EL				Did not advance		
	Agostina Llano	Paraguay	Falcon	7.12	EL				Did not advance		
	Martín Vera	Paraguay	Della Cornet	8.50	EL				Did not advance		
	Guilherme Foroni	Brazil	Casella Blanca Jmen	11.60	EL				Did not advance		
	Fernando Bedoya	Bolivia	BM Armagnac	17.75	EL				Did not advance		
	Felipe Cedres	Uruguay	P'Compadre Gama Champion	20.20	EL				Did not advance		
	Nicole Mingorance	Bolivia	Darco Van Het Dennehof	RET					Did not advance		

=== Team Jumping ===
Rank	Nation	Name	Horse	1st Round			2nd Round A			2nd Round B			Total Pen.
Rank	Nation	Name	Horse	Ind. Pen.	Team Pen.	Rank	Ind. Pen.	Team Pen.	Rank	Ind. Pen.	Team Pen.	Rank	Total Pen.
1st place, gold medalist(s)	Brazil	Stephan Barcha; Geronimo Ciavaglia; Guilherme Foroni; José Roberto Fernández Filho	Chevaux Primavera Montana IE; GR Garuda; Casella Blanca Jmen; Santiago Rosebug	0.52; 1.50; ~~11.60~~; 0.00	2.02	1	1; 4; ~~48~~; 4	9	1=	0; 0; 0; ~~0~~	0	1	11.02
2nd place, silver medalist(s)	Argentina	Damián Ancic; Nicolás Elustondo; Joaquín Albisu; Martín Dopazo	Santa Rosa Chabacón; Cooper Gypsy Eyes; Don Aurelio; Pegasus Chau Amore	1.70; ~~5.59~~; 3.17; 0.46	5.33	2	1; ~~48~~; 4; 4	9	1=	4; ~~8~~; 4; 0	8	3	22.33
3rd place, bronze medalist(s)	Chile	Alexandr Imschenetzky; Ricardo Luttecke; Gabriela Reutter; Samuel Parot	Caspaccio; Agua Fiesta; Maharees Rock; Captain Z	3.81; 3.44; ~~9.01~~; 1.65	8.90	3	4; 8; 5; ~~10~~	17	3	0; 0; ~~8~~; 4	4	2	29.90
4	Uruguay	Juan Manuel Luzardo; Raúl Guarino de Oliveira; Lupe Valente; Martín Rodríguez	Dalien Swally R.P. Ata Caspita; Libertina Jotamen 2 Dom Da Essencia	5.78; 6.92; ~~13.16~~; 4.40	17.10	4	9; 8; ~~28~~; 8	25	4	3; 12; ~~13~~; 12	27	5	69.10
5	Ecuador	Ivan Christiansen; Anna Gansauer; Gonzalo Meza	Giorgia Z Day Dream; Larissa	9.74; 6.76; 2.56	19.06	5	22; 14; 4	40	5	10; 8; 1	19	4	78.06
6	Bolivia	Nicole Mignorance; Fernando Bedoya; Rodrigo Bedoya; Daniel Bedoya	Darco Van Het Dennehof; BM Armagnac; Lancaster LV V'T Diepenbr; Quimi del Maset	~~40.20~~; 17.75; 5.89; 4.57	28.21	7	0; 8; 48.00 (EL); 0	56 (EL)	6				84.21
7	Paraguay	Ignacio Galeano; Agostina Llano; Martín Vera; Stieven Bardwin	Casqero; Falcon; Della Cornet; Cheptel Valjean	5.93; 7.12; ~~8.50~~; 6.17	19.22	6	7; 48 (EL); 48 (EL); 26	81 (EL)	7				100.22
