= Virginia Yarur =

Chilean dressage rider (born 1966)

Personal information
- Full name: Virginia Yarur Ready
- Born: December 14, 1966 (age 59) Santiago, Chile
- Website: virginiayarurdressage.com

Sport
- Sport: Dressage
- Coached by: Yvonne Losos de Muñiz

Achievements and titles
- Olympic finals: 2020 Olympic Games
Medal record
Equestrian
Representing Chile
South American Games
Bronze medal – third place	2014 Santiago	Team dressage

Virginia Yarur Ready (born 14 December 1966 in Santiago, Chile) is a Chilean Olympic dressage rider. She won a team bronze at the 2014 South American Games, and has competed at four Pan American Games (in 1995, 2011, 2015 and 2019). She is based in Wellington, Florida.

Yarur represented Chile during the 2020 Olympic Games after Bermuda did not fulfilled the qualification criteria, while Chile replaced Bermuda. The last time Chile was represented in dressage during the Olympic Games was in 1968. She was ranked 46th in the individual competition during the Olympic Games.
