= Bernadette Pujals =

Mexican equestrian (born 1968)

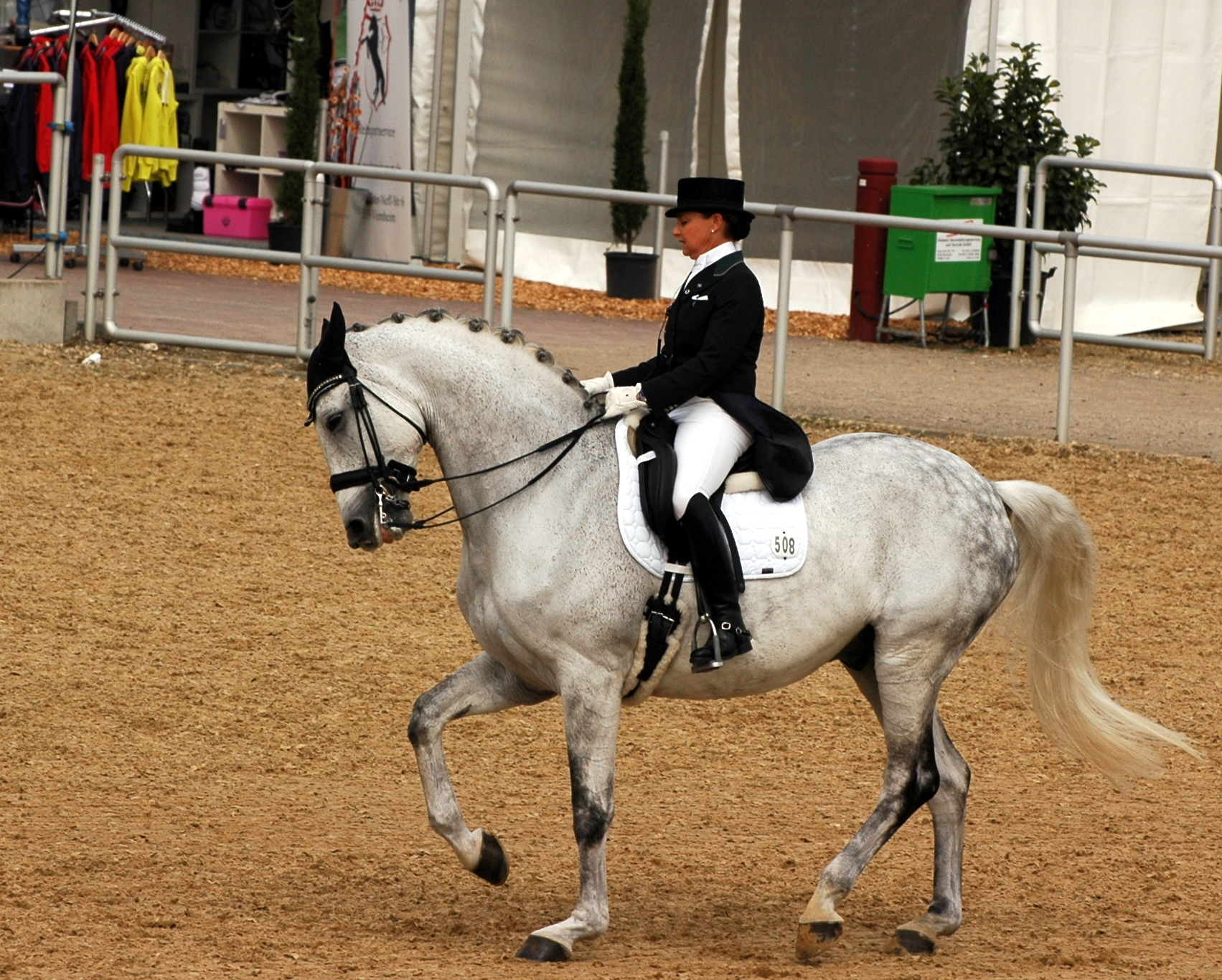
- Pujals in 2015

Personal information
- Full name: Bernadette Pujals Cavallo
- Nationality: Mexican
- Born: 8 July 1968 (age 58); Barcelona, Spain
Medal record
Equestrian
Representing Mexico
Pan American Games
Silver medal – second place	2003 Santo Domingo	Individual dressage
Bronze medal – third place	1999 Winnipeg	Individual dressage
Bronze medal – third place	1999 Winnipeg	Team dressage
Bronze medal – third place	2003 Santo Domingo	Team dressage
Central American and Caribbean Games
Gold medal – first place	2002 San Salvador	Team dressage
Gold medal – first place	2014 Veracruz	Individual dressage
Gold medal – first place	2014 Veracruz	Team dressage
Silver medal – second place	2006 Bogota	Team dressage
Bronze medal – third place	2002 San Salvador	Individual dressage
Bronze medal – third place	2002 San Salvador	Freestyle dressage
Bronze medal – third place	2010 Mayaguez	Team dressage
Bronze medal – third place	2014 Veracruz	Freestyle dressage

Bernadette Pujals Cavallo (Note: In this Spanish name, the first or paternal surname is Pujals and the second or maternal family name is Cavallo.) (born 8 July 1968) is a Mexican Olympic dressage rider. Representing Mexico, she competed at two Summer Olympics (in 2008 and 2016). Her best Olympic result came at the 2008 Beijing Games, where she achieved 9th position in the individual dressage competition.

Pujals also competed at two editions of World Equestrian Games (in 1998 and 2006). Her current best World Equestrian Games results came in 2006, when she placed 10th in both special and freestyle dressage competitions.

Pujals has won several medals at Pan American Games and at Central American and Caribbean Games.

In 2020 she decided to ride under the Spanish flag.
