= Brittany Fraser-Beaulieu =

Canadian equestrian

Personal information
- Born: August 27, 1988 (age 37) New Glasgow, Nova Scotia, Canada
- Height: 170 cm (5 ft 7 in)
- Weight: 55 kg (121 lb)
Medal record
Equestrian Dressage
Representing Canada
Pan American Games
Silver medal – second place	2015 Toronto	Team dressage

Brittany Fraser-Beaulieu (born August 27, 1988), originally from New Glasgow, Nova Scotia, is a Canadian Olympic equestrian competing in the dressage discipline.

== Career ==
Fraser-Beaulieu competed at the 2015 Pan American Games in Toronto, winning the silver medal in the team dressage and finishing fourth in the individual event.

Fraser-Beaulieu was part of the Canada's 2020 Olympic team, where she finished 18th in the individual final.

Brittany was the Chef d’Equipe for Team Canada Dressage at the 2024 Paris Olympic Games.
