= Patricia Ferrando =

Venezuelan dressage rider

Personal information
- Nationality: Venezuela, Italy
- Born: 19 July 1985 (age 40) Caracas, Venezuela

Sport
- Sport: Equestrian
- Event: Dressage
- Coached by: Yvonne Losos de Muñiz

Achievements and titles
- Olympic finals: 2024 Olympic Games
- World finals: 2019 Pan American Games
Medal record
Equestrian
Representing Venezuela
Bolivarian Games
Gold medal – first place	2009 Cochabamba	Team dressage

Patricia Ferrando (born 19 July 1985 in Caracas, Venezuela) is an Italian and Venezuelan Olympic dressage rider. She competed at the 2019 Pan American Games in Lima where she became 12th in the finals and at the 2015 Pan-American Games in Toronto. She won a golden team medal at the 2009 Bolivarian Games, with the Venezuelan team. She is currently the most successful dressage rider from Venezuela.

In 2019 Patricia tried to qualify for the Olympic Games in Tokyo 2020 under supervision of her trainer Yvonne Losos de Muñiz and competed at several international competitions in Europe, including Denmark, the Netherlands, Austria and Spain. Patricia qualified Venezuela as first reserve country from Group D & E (North America, Central and South America) following the FEI regulations for the Olympic Games.

Ferrando competed at the 2024 Olympic Games in Paris, becoming the first Venezuelan dressage athlete at the Olympics.
