= La Sebastina =

Horse racing facility in Bayamón, Puerto Rico

- Interactive map of La Sebastina
- Location: Bayamón, Puerto Rico
- Capacity: 1,000

La Sebastina is a horse racing facility in Bayamón, Puerto Rico. It hosted the Equestrian events for the 2010 Central American and Caribbean Games.
