= María Florencia Manfredi =

Argentine equestrian

Personal information
- Nickname: Flor
- Born: Maria Florencia Manfredi; 16 April 1982 (age 44)
- Website: www.dressagebyflorencia.com
Medal record
Equestrian
Representing Argentina
South American Games
Silver medal – second place	2014 Santiago	Team dressage
Silver medal – second place	2022 Asuncion	Team dressage

María Florencia Manfredi (born 16 April 1982) is an Argentine equestrian athlete. She competed at the 2018 FEI World Equestrian Games and was the first rider who represent Argentina during a World Cup Final in Dressage. She competed also at the South American Games in Medellin 2010 and Quillota 2014, where she won team silver. In 2015 she competed at the 2015 Pan American Games.
