= Emanuel Andrade =

Venezuelan show jumping rider

Personal information
- Born: September 11, 1996 (age 29)
Medal record
Equestrian
Representing Venezuela
Central American and Caribbean Games
Silver medal – second place	2014 Veracruz	Individual jumping
Bronze medal – third place	2014 Veracruz	Team jumping
Bolivarian Games
Gold medal – first place	2013 Trujillo	Team jumping

Emanuel Alejandro Andrade Colmenares (born 11 September 1996) is a Venezuelan Olympic show jumping rider.

== Career ==
He competed at the 2016 Summer Olympics in Rio de Janeiro where he finished 61st in the individual competition, collecting 13 penalties in total during the first qualification round.

Andrade competed at the 2014 World Equestrian Games, where he placed 19th in the team and 70th in the individual jumping competition. He also participated at several regional games, including the 2015 Pan American Games.

== Personal life ==
Andrade's father Alejandro Andrade, convicted thief and money launderer, raided hundreds of millions of dollars from his native country of Venezuela before being raided by the FBI and leaving Andrade family members, Emanuel included, "as broke and destitute as the country they embezzled from and then abandoned." All of Andrade's horses were seized by the FBI in 2018, as they had been purchased by his father with money from bribes.

He came out in an Instagram post in 2018.
