= Sabine Schut-Kery =

German-American dressage rider (born 1968)

Personal information
- Nationality: American, German
- Born: September 10, 1968 (age 57) Krefeld, Germany

Sport
- Country: United States
- Sport: Equestrian, Dressage
- Coached by: Christine Traurig

Achievements and titles
- Olympic finals: 2020 Olympic Games
- Regional finals: 2015 Pan-American Games
Medal record
Equestrian
Representing United States
Olympic Games
Silver medal – second place	2020 Tokyo	Team dressage
Pan-American Games
Gold medal – first place	2015 Toronto	Team dressage

Sabine Schut-Kery (born September 10, 1968) is a German-American dressage rider. She competed at the Pan-American Games in 2015 where she won team gold with the American team. In 2021 the US Equestrian Federation nominated Schut-Kery to represent the US at the 2020 Olympic Games in Tokyo, where she won a silver medal in the team competition.

== Personal life ==
Schut-Kery was born in Krefeld, Germany. She trained for many years in Germany, but in 1998 she moved to Texas to become Head Trainer at Proud Meadows. In 2005 she moved to California to pursue her dressage career. She became US citizen in 2007.
