= Andres Rodriguez (show jumper) =

Andrés Rodríguez
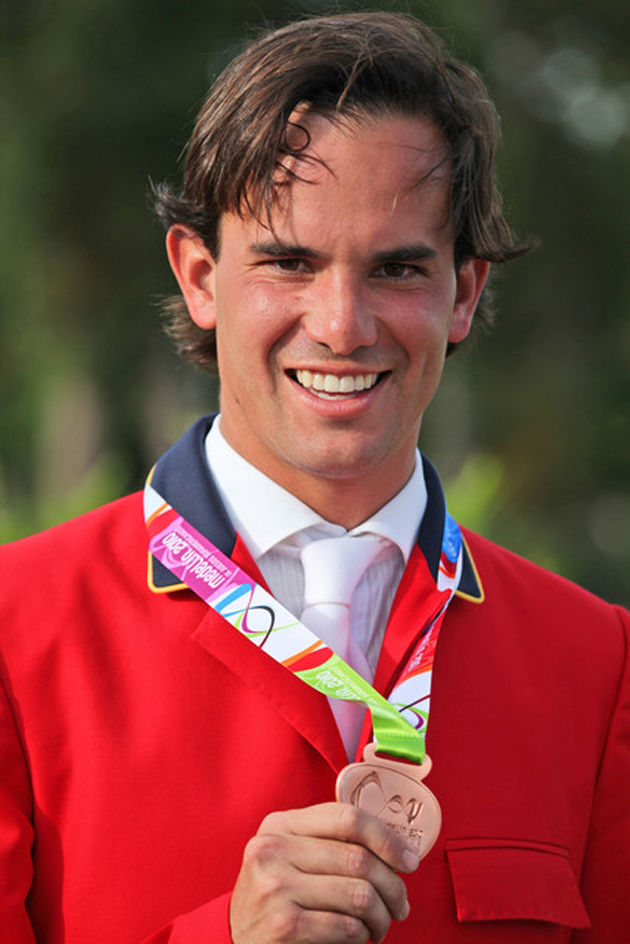
- Andres Rodríguez – Team bronze medal – ODESUR Games 2010

Personal information
- Full name: Andrés Rodríguez Gómez
- Other names: Chepito
- Nationality: Venezuelan
- Discipline: Show jumping
- Born: 11 May 1984; Caracas, Venezuela
- Died: 4 January 2016 (aged 31); Wellington, Florida, U.S.
- Horse(s): Darlon van Groenhove, Caballito, Fifty Fifty 111
Medal record
Equestrian
Representing Venezuela
Pan American Games
Silver medal – second place	2015 Toronto	Individual jumping
Bolivarian Games
Gold medal – first place	2013 Lima	Individual jumping (GP)
Gold medal – first place	2013 Lima	Individual jumping (speed)
Gold medal – first place	2013 Lima	Team jumping
Silver medal – second place	2013 Lima	Individual jumping (acc.)
Silver medal – second place	2005 Bogota	Team jumping
Central American and Caribbean Games
Gold medal – first place	2010 Mayaguez	Team jumping
Silver medal – second place	2010 Mayaguez	Individual jumping
Bronze medal – third place	2014 Veracruz	Team jumping
South American Championships
Silver medal – second place	2001 Caracas	Individual jumping

Andres Rodríguez (11 May 1984 – 4 January 2016) was a Venezuelan businessman and an international show jumping competitor. He travelled between Caracas, Paris (where he was based during the summer season), and Florida (where he managed a competition horses facility). Rodriguez trained with rider and coach Eddie Macken. His achievements included the team silver medal at the 2005 Bolivarian Games, the team bronze medal at the 2014 Central American and Caribbean Games, an individual silver medal at the 2015 Pan American Games of Toronto, and subsequent qualification to the 2016 Summer Olympics in Rio de Janeiro. Rodriguez entered the world top 50 for the first time in August 2015, and the subsequent series of results enabled him to be world no. 42 in the Longines rankings of October 2015 and no. 2 in the Latin America rankings.

== Early life and education ==
He was the son of César Rodríguez and Josefina Gómez, who is Alejandro Gomez Sigala’s sister. Rodríguez was born in Caracas on 11 May 1984. He studied for a degree in International Business from Lynn University, Florida, and sat on the Board of Directors of Insmart Colombia and Wendy's Venezuela. He spoke Spanish, English, French, and Portuguese fluently.

On December 5, 2015, he married American equestrian Clementine Goutal in Playa del Carmen.

== Career ==
Rodríguez decided to become a professional rider at the age of 12 and started competing in horse shows. He won the final in the children category in 1996, a competition for young children under 14, then won the silver medal in the junior category in the 2001 South American Championships.

Rodríguez trained with Nelson and Rodrigo Pessoa (BRA) from 2002 to 2006, in Belgium where the Pessoa family was based. This allowed him to compete in Europe. In 2005, he was a member of team Venezuela and helped claim the team silver medal at the Bolivarian Games in Bogota, Colombia. He finished in eighth position individually.

In 2013 he placed in the Las Vegas National Horse Show, the Fort Classic Grand Prix and the World Cup Grand Prix in Las Vegas.

In 2014, Rodríguez competed at the Central American and Caribbean Games in Veracruz, Mexico, and helped his team win the bronze medal. This result qualified the country for the 2015 PanAmerican Games in Toronto, Canada, where he won the individual silver medal. In 2015 he won in Wellington, Lexington, and Spruce Meadows and Rodriguez broke into the world top 50 in show jumping. The silver medal at the PanAmerican Games in Toronto and his subsequent qualification to Rio de Janeiro's 2016 Summer Olympics enabled him to place forty-second worldwide in the October's world rankings and second in the Latin America rankings.

== Endorsements ==
Rodríguez was the first Venezuelan ambassador of the charity association JustWorld International. The charity was established by former United States show jumper Jessica Newman and aims at helping impoverished children through food and educational programs. Rodriguez was an ambassador for brands such as Samshield and Manfredi Equestrian.

== Awards and recognition ==
=== Regional and continental championships ===
FEI

- Silver medal South American Championships – Junior – Caracas, Venezuela, 2001
- Team silver medal, Bolivarian Games Bogota, Colombia, 2005
- Individual gold medal, ODESUR Games, Medellin, 2010
- Team bronze medal, ODESUR Games, Medellin, 2010
- Individual bronze medal, ODESUR Games, Medellin, 2010
- Individual silver medal, ODESUR Games, Medellin, 2010
- Team gold medal, Central American and Caribbean Games Mayaguez, PUR 2010
- Individual silver medal, Central American and Caribbean Games Mayaguez, PUR, 2010
- Team gold medal, Bolivarian Games Lima, Peru, 2013
- Individual silver medal, Bolivarian Games Lima, Peru, 2013 (Accumulated)
- Individual gold medal, Bolivarian Games Lima, Peru, 2013 (Grand Prix)
- Individual gold medal, Bolivarian Games Lima, Peru, 2013 (Speed)
- Team bronze medal Central American and Caribbean Games, Veracruz, Mexico, 2014
- Individual silver medal Panamerican Games, Toronto, Canada, 2015

Other results

- 1st place GP CSI 3* - Tryon NC, USA – Ariantha.
- 1st place CSI 5* - Calgary, CAN – Verdi.
- 1st place CSI 3* - Lexington, KY, USA – Darlon Van Groenhove
- 1st place CSI 5* - Wellington FL, USA – Caballito
- 3rd place CSIO 5* - Dublin, IRL – Fifty Fifty 111
- 2nd place CSIO 5* Puissance – Dublin, IRL – Caballito
- 6th place CSIO 5* Derby – Dublin, IRL – Fifty Fifty 111
- 4th place CSI 5* - Dinard, FRA – Fifty Fifty 111
- 2nd place CSI 3* GP – Le Touquet, FRA – Darlon van Groenhove
- 2nd place CSI 3* GP – Windsor, GRB – Caballito
- 2nd place CSI 5* GCT – Hamburg, GER – Darlon van Groenhove
- 3rd place CSI 3* GP – Maubeuge, FRA – Darlon van Groenhove
- 2nd place CSI 5* - Wellington FL, USA – Caballito
- 3rd place CSI 4* GP – Wellington FL, USA – Caballito
- 6th place CSIO 4* GP – Wellington FL, USA – Caballito
- 6th place CSI 5* - Wellington FL, USA – Fifty Fifty 111
- 9th place CSI 5* GP – Wellington FL, USA – Caballito

== Death ==
On 4 January 2016, Rodriguez was driving with fellow equestrian rider Sophie Walker in his 1992 dark blue Porsche when he slammed into a concrete pillar at over 60 mph. The sports car was crushed against the pillar and the passenger side took a large impact. Firefighters and paramedics tried to revive Walker but she died at the scene of the crash, having slammed her head against the windshield. Rodriguez was transported via ambulance to Delray Medical Center, where he died a few hours later, on the same day.

Rodriguez and Walker were leaving a party when the crash occurred.

Rodriguez was over the legal alcohol limit, according to the Palm Beach Sheriff office.
