= Alejandro Gómez Sigala =

Venezuelan equestrian (born 1960)

Alejandro Gómez Sigala (born in Barquisimeto, Venezuela, 6 December 1960) is an equestrian.

== Career ==
He took up dressage well into adulthood, and in a few years (2007 to the present) accumulated an extensive record of participation in national and international events.

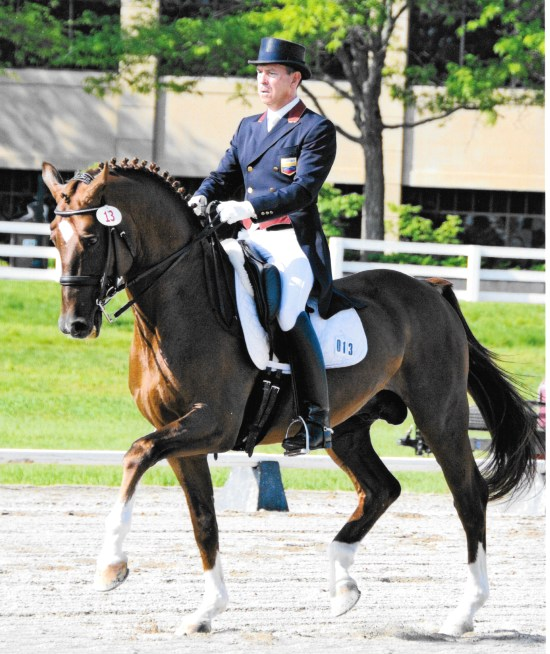
Alejandro Gomez Sigala

Since 2009, his record of participation includes:

- 2009 Bolivarian Games, Cochabamba, Bolivia: individual gold and overall gold
- 2010 South American Games, Medellin, Colombia: individual gold, overall bronze, team bronze
- 2010 Central American and Caribbean Games, Mayagüez, Puerto Rico: [Medalla de Plata PSG, cuarto de final individual y quinto general acumulado?]
- 2011 Pan American Games, Guadalajara, Mexico: sixth place team
- 2015 Pan American Games, Toronto, Canada: no medals
- 2016 Adequan Global Dressage Festival CDI5, Wellington Florida, USA:
- 2017 Continental/Regional Games Bolivarian Games-D Bogotá (COL)
- 2022 Juegos Bolivarianos Valledupar Doma clásica individual y por equipos. Medalla de bronce en la prueba por equipos
- 2023 Juegos Centroamericanos y del Caribe San Salvador 2023, Palmarejo, República Dominicana: Doma clásica individual- Finalista en la modalidad de doma clásica

== Personal life ==
He is Andres Rodriguez's uncle.
