= Hector Florentino =

Equestrian from Dominican Republic

Personal information
- Full name: Hector Florentino Roca
- Born: 2 November 1972 (age 53)
Medal record
Equestrian
Representing Dominican Republic
Central American and Caribbean Games
Gold medal – first place	2018 Barranquilla	Individual jumping
Bronze medal – third place	2014 Veracruz	Individual jumping

Hector Florentino Roca (born 2 November 1972) is an equestrian from Dominican Republic.

== Career ==
He won gold at the 2018 Central American and Caribbean Games in Barranquilla, Colombia. In 2011, 2015, and 2020, the Dominican Equestrian Sports Federation named him the International Jumping Rider of the Year. He was selected to compete for Dominican Republic at the 2020 Summer Olympics in the show jumping.

In January 2022, riding ABC Quantum Cruise Florentino won the opening first Challenge Cup at the Winter Equestrian Festival hosted at the Palm Beach International Equestrian Centre in Florida. In May 2022, Florentino won the $75,000 Bear’s Smokehouse BBQ Grand Prix CSI 2* event in Mill Spring, North Carolina riding ABC Quantum Cruise. Florentino had two rides in the 7 horse jump off. Rising Ultimo, Florentino won the $35,000 Welcome Cup at the Kentucky Horse Show held in Lexington in May 2022.

In 2023, Florentino was suspended for an Equine Anti-Doping Rule Violation. The horse, Meadowvale Cruise, was tested during the Bolivarian Games and returned a positive result for Testosterone, which is an anabolic steroid that improves performance by promoting muscular development. Testosterone is a “Banned Substance” under the FEI's 2022 Equine Prohibited Substances list.
