= Pablo Barrios (equestrian) =

Venezuelan equestrian (born 1964)

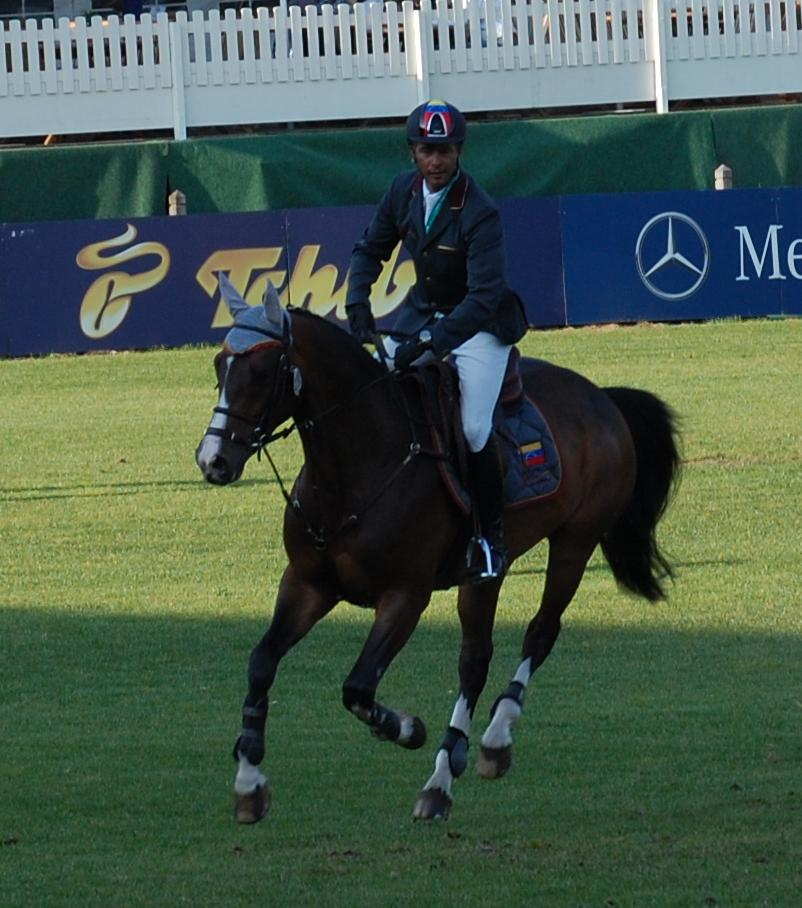
- Pablo Barrios riding Con Air

Personal information
- Born: July 14, 1964 (age 61) Caracas
Medal record
Equestrian
Representing Venezuela
Central American and Caribbean Games and Bolivarian Games
Gold medal – first place	2010 Mayaguez	Individual jumping
Gold medal – first place	2010 Mayaguez	Team jumping
Bolivarian Games
Gold medal – first place	2009 Sucre	Individual jumping
Gold medal – first place	2013 Trujillo	Individual jumping
Gold medal – first place	2013 Trujillo	Team jumping

Pablo Barrios (born 14 July 1964) is a Venezuelan Olympic show jumping rider. Representing Venezuela, he competed at two Summer Olympics (in 2008 and 2016). His best Olympic result came in 2008 when he placed 40th individually.

Barrios competed at four World Equestrian Games (in 1998, 2006, 2010 and 2014) and at the 2011 edition of Show Jumping World Cup finals. He also participated at several regional games, including four Pan American Games.

== Doping ==
At the 2014 Central American and Caribbean games, Barrios's mount was found to test positive for hydrochlorothiazide, a banned substance. He found responsible and was disqualified from the event.
