= Yvonne Losos de Muñiz =

Dominican Republic equestrian (born 1967)

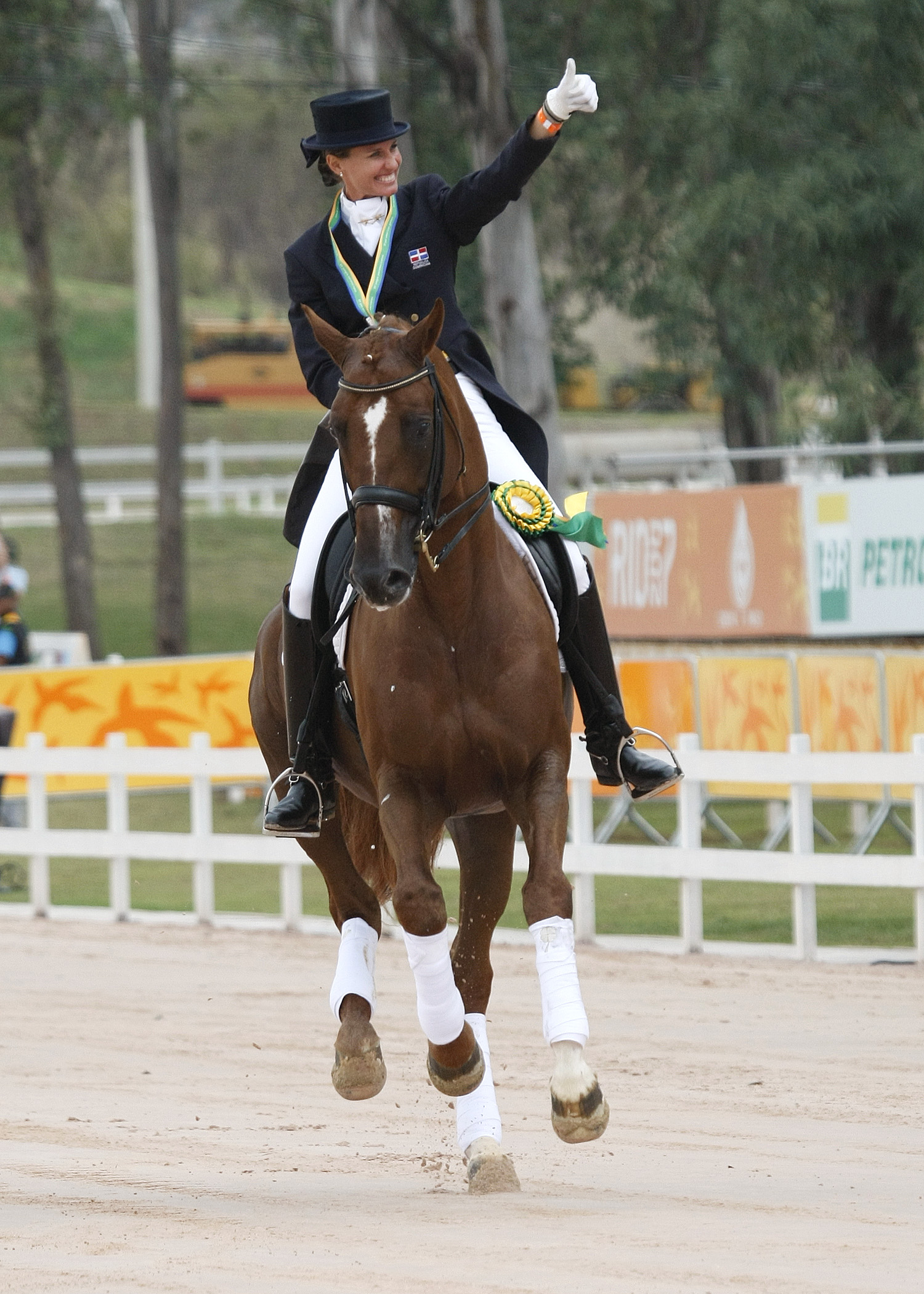
- Losos de Muñiz at the 2007 Pan American Games

Personal information
- Citizenship: Canada; Dominican Republic
- Born: 8 September 1967 (age 58) Ibadan, Nigeria
- Spouse: Eduardo Muñiz

Sport
- Country: Dominican Republic
Medal record
Equestrian
Representing the Dominican Republic
Pan American Games
Bronze medal – third place	2003 Santo Domingo	Individual dressage
Bronze medal – third place	2007 Rio de Janeiro	Individual dressage
Central American and Caribbean Games
Gold medal – first place	2002 San Salvador	Individual dressage
Gold medal – first place	2002 San Salvador	Freestyle dressage
Gold medal – first place	2018 Barranquilla	Individual dressage
Gold medal – first place	2018 Barranquilla	Freestyle dressage
Gold medal – first place	2023 Santo Domingo	Individual dressage
Gold medal – first place	2023 Santo Domingo	Freestyle dressage
Silver medal – second place	2014 Veracruz	Freestyle dressage
Silver medal – second place	2018 Barranquilla	Team dressage
Bronze medal – third place	2002 San Salvador	Team dressage
Bronze medal – third place	2014 Veracruz	Individual dressage

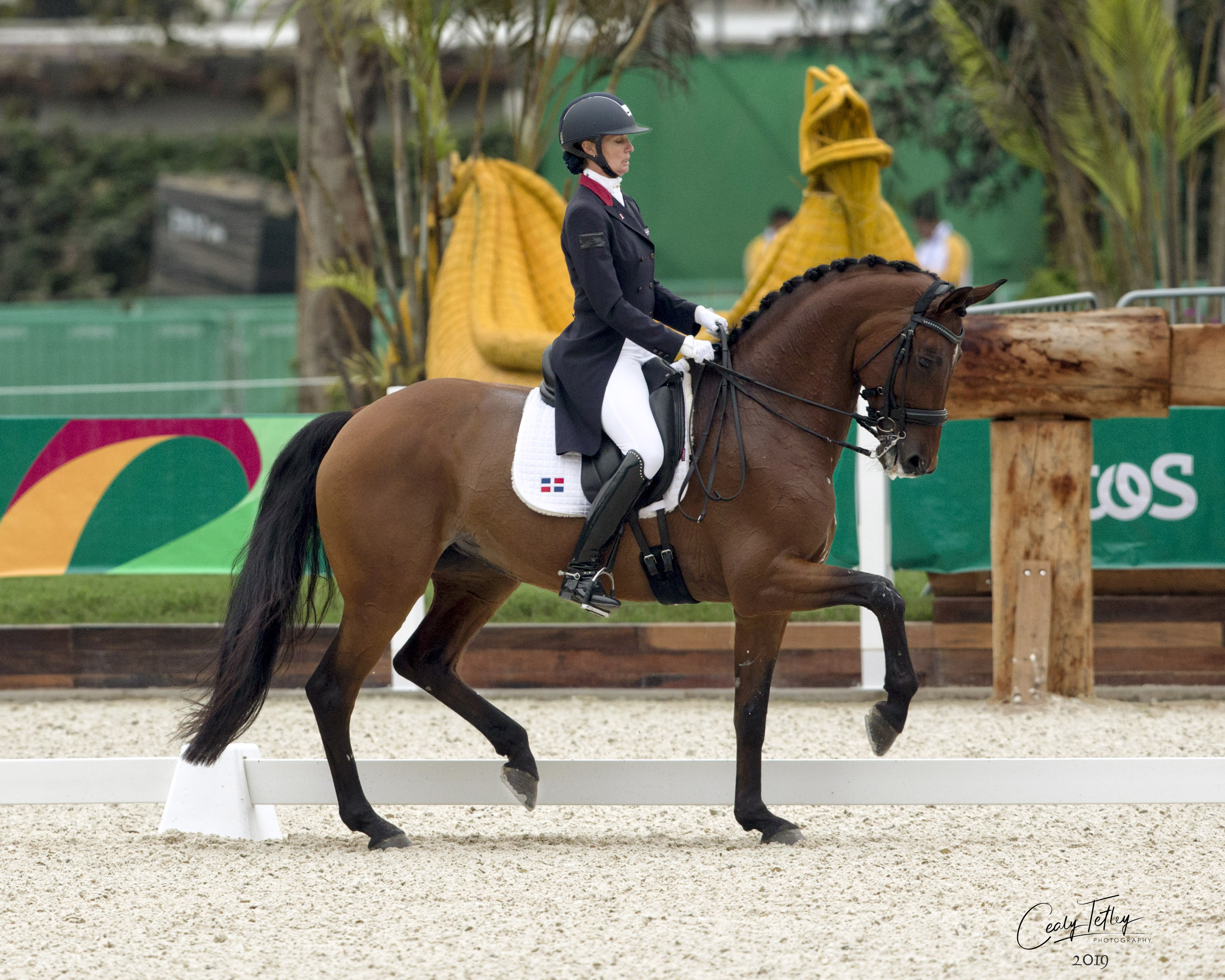
Yvonne Losos de Muñiz and Aquamarijn at the 2019 Pan American Games

Yvonne Losos de Muñiz (born 8 September 1967) is an Olympic athlete and international Grand Prix dressage rider. Born in Nigeria to Canadian parents, she represents the Dominican Republic internationally. She belongs to the elite Dominican Olympic athlete program CRESO.

== Career ==
She won the individual bronze medal at the 2007 Pan American Games in Rio de Janeiro, Brazil, riding her approved Hannoverian stallion Bernstein. With that medal she repeated her performance from the 2003 Pan American Games held in her home country, where she also obtained the individual bronze medal riding a different mount, a Dutch mare named Inatana.

Prior to her Pan Am medals, Losos de Muñiz also won double individual gold and a team bronze medal at the 2002 Central American Games in El Salvador. In 2010 she added two individual silver medals to her collection at the Central American and Caribbean Games which took place in Mayagüez, Puerto Rico.

In 2010, she also qualified for the World Equestrian Games (WEG) with her Austrian Warmblood Optimus Prime.

In addition to her twelve championship medals, she has also obtained numerous wins in Grand Prix and Small Tour at prestigious international events held in West Palm Beach, Florida, the Sunshine Tour (Spain), France and Germany. She has trained with riding master Jean Bemelmans, who also coached the Spanish Olympic team, as well as Harry Boldt from Germany, Jeff Ashton Moore from the USA, Carl Hester from England, Diederik Wigmans from the Netherlands, Ton de Ridder from Germany, Jose Antonio Garcia Mena from Spain, Andreas Helgstrand from Denmark and her current coach Kathy Priest from the United States.

Losos de Muñiz competed at the 2016 Summer Olympics in Rio de Janeiro, becoming the first Dominican equestrian athlete to participate at the Olympic Games. She was also a competitor at the 2020 Tokyo Olympic Games, which took place in the summer of 2021. She placed 22nd out of 60 participants in the final individual results, scoring a 70.8% in the Grand Prix.

Following a winning streak at a number of international events in Wellington, Florida during the 2018 Adequan Global Dressage Festival, she qualified-together with her Belgian warmblood gelding Foco Loco W-for the single individual slot available to non-league nations for the FEI Dressage World Cup Final held in Paris, France. Her participation in the event marked the first time a rider from the Central America and the Caribbean competed in the global event.

In July 2018, she won two individual gold medals at the Central American and Caribbean Games held in Colombia, and also won a team a team silver as the anchor rider for the Dominican Republic national team. At the event she rode Fredensdals Zig Zag, a Danish warmblood owned by Kathy Priest.

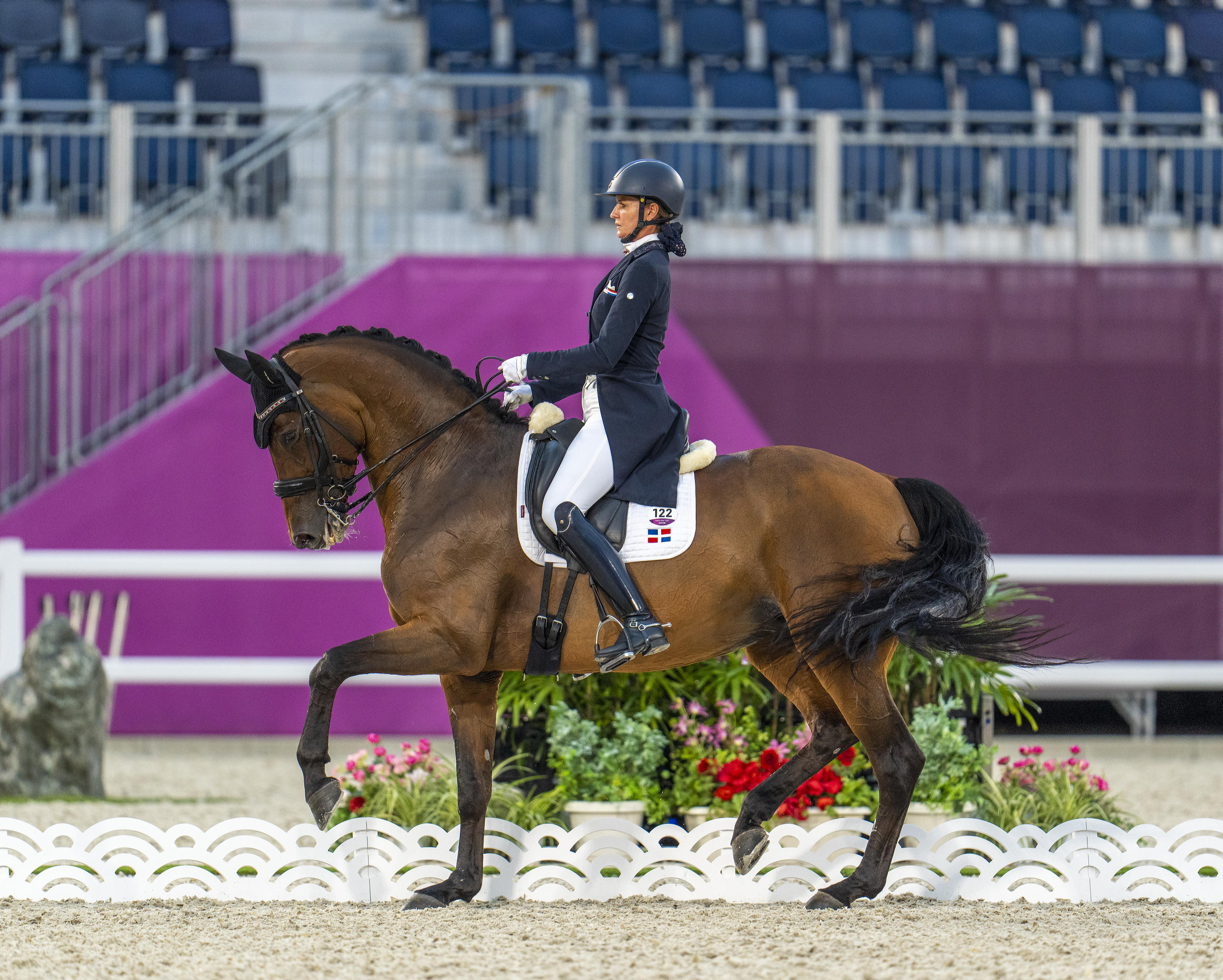
Yvonne Losos de Muñiz and Aquamarijn at the Tokyo Olympic Games

Although she had qualified for the 2018 World Equestrian Games with two horses, a shoulder injury prevented her from participating, forcing a two-month layoff from riding altogether.

In 2019 she competed in the FEI Dressage World Cup Final held in Gothenburg, Sweden, and qualified as an individual for the 2020 Olympic Games, postponed to 2021. In 2019 she also participated in the Pan American Games held in Lima, Peru, where she finished fourth in the individual final. She continued her competitive performances during 2020, when she won the individual silver medal with her mare Aquamarijn at the FEI Nations Cup held in Wellington, Florida. In 2023 she won two individual gold medals at the 2023 Central American and Caribbean Games held in her hometown of Santo Domingo, Dominican Republic.

During the winter show season, she competes in the dressage shows held in Wellington, Florida. During the spring and summer she competes regularly in the European circuit.

She is consistently ranked in the top 100 in the FEI World Dressage Rankings, the only Latin American rider to achieve this, and has ranked as high as 27th.

In September 2020, she received the prestigious Gold Medal Badge of Honor from the International Equestrian Federation (FEI), as a recognition of her multiple participations at Olympic Games, Continental Championships, World Cup Finals and Nations Cups, becoming the first dressage athlete from Latin America to receive this distinction.

In April 2022, she took part in her third FEI Dressage World Cup Finals in Leipzig, Germany, where she placed tenth overall, the best historic result for any Latin American rider.

As a trainer, she has coached numerous riders from Latin America and Europe to top performances at international events and continental championships, and two of her students, Virginia Yarur from Chile and Patricia Ferrando from Venezuela, were in the qualified short list for the 2021 Olympic Games. Yarur went on to qualify as an individual for the Tokyo Games, where she successfully represented Chile and became the first Olympic dressage rider from that nation in over fifty years.

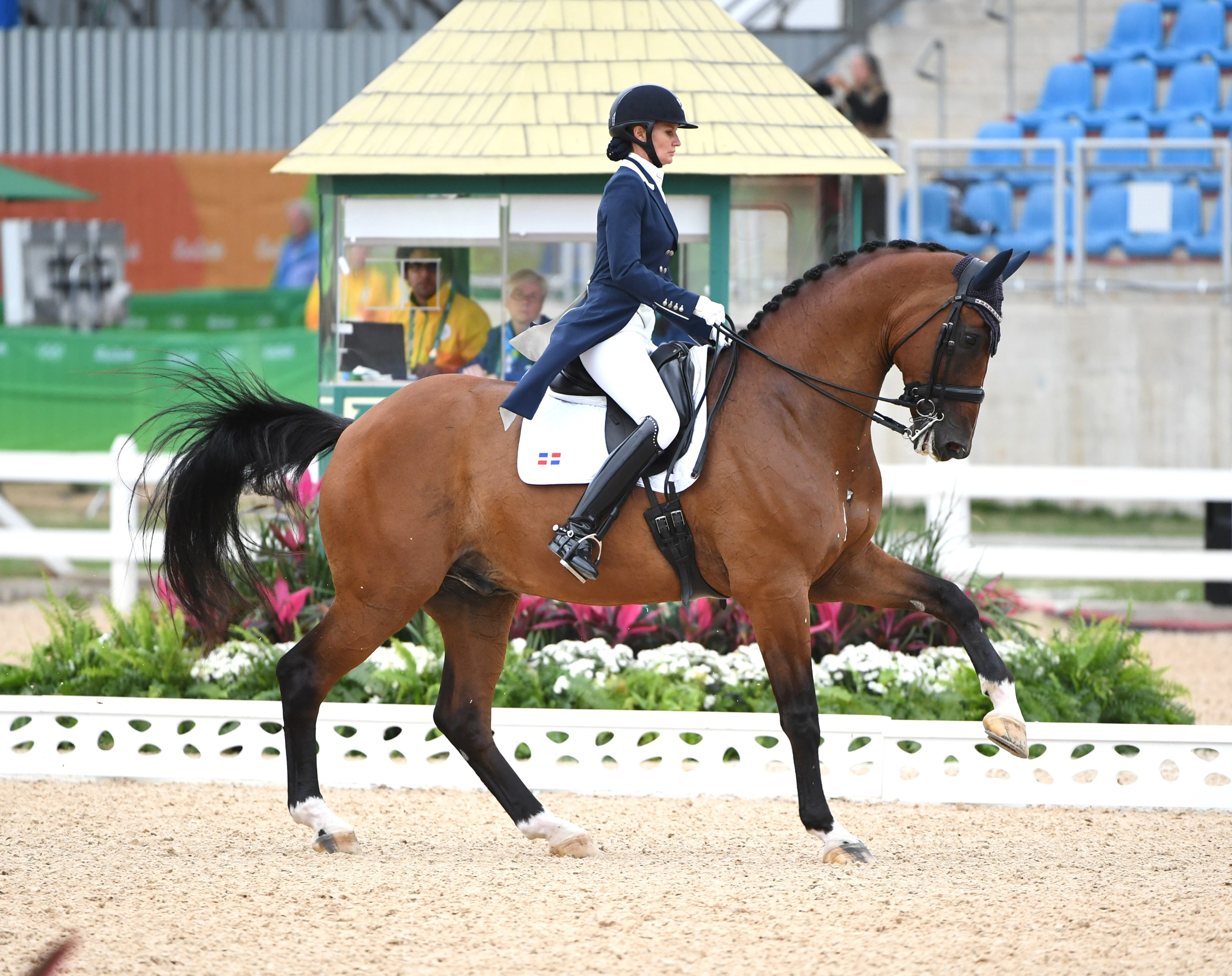
Yvonne Losos de Muñiz and Foco Loco W at the 2016 Olympic Games

Yvonne is the dressage athletes' representative at the FEI Dressage Committee and a member of the Board of Directors of the International Dressage Riders Club (IDRC), as well as a USDF Gold, Silver and Bronze medalist.

== Personal life ==
Losos de Muñiz was born in Ibadan, Nigeria, to Dr. George Losos, a Polish pathologist, and his wife Gudrun, originally from Germany.

She was raised in Uganda and Kenya. She began riding as a teenager in Germany before subsequently moving to Canada. In Canada, the family acquired Canadian citizenship.

She lives in the Dominican Republic since 1990 with her Dominican-born husband; she acquired the Dominican nationality by marriage. She speaks English, German, Spanish, and Swahili.
