= Equestrian at the 2011 Pan American Games – Individual dressage =

Individual dressage at the 2011 Pan American Games
- Venues: Guadalajara Country Club; Hipica Club
- Dates: October 16–19, 2011
- Competitors: 48 from 14 nations

Medalists
Gold medal	Steffen Peters on Weltino's Magic	United States
Silver medal	Heather Blitz on Paragon	United States
Bronze medal	Marisa Festerling on Big Tyme	United States

The individual dressage competition of the equestrian events at the 2011 Pan American Games took place between October 16–19 at the Guadalajara Country Club and the Hipica Club. The defending Pan American champion was Christopher Hickey of the United States of America.

The first round of the individual dressage competition is the FEI Prix St. Georges Test. The Prix St. Georges Test consists of a battery of required movements that each rider and horse pair performs. Five judges evaluate the pair, giving marks between 0 and 10 for each element. The judges' scores were averaged to give a final score for the pair.

The top 25 individual competitors in that round advance to the individual-only competitions, though each nation was limited to three pairs advancing. This second round consisted of an Intermediare I Test, which is a higher degree of difficulty. The 15 best pairs in the Intermediare I Test advanced to the final round. That round consists of, the Intermediare I Freestyle Test, competitors designed their own choreography set to music. Judges in that round evaluated the artistic merit of the performance and music as well as the technical aspects of the dressage. Final scores were based on the average of the Freestyle and Intermediare I Test results.

== Schedule ==
All times are Central Standard Time (UTC-6).

Date	Time	Round
October 16, 2011	8:30	First session
October 17, 2011	9:00	Second session
October 19, 2011	15:00	Final

== Judges ==
Appointment of Dressage judges was as follows:

- (United Kingdom) Stephen Clarke (Ground Jury President)
- (United States) Liselotte Fore (Ground Jury Member)
- (Canada) Cara Whitham (Ground Jury Member)
- (France) Raphael Saleh (Ground Jury Member)
- (Argentina) Gabriel Armando (Ground Jury Member)
- (Belgium) Freddy Leyman (Technical Delegate)

== Results ==
=== Qualification ===
Rank	Rider	Nation	Horse	PSG Score	Notes
1	Steffen Peters	United States	Weltino's Magic	80.132	Q
2	Heather Anderson Blitz	United States	Paragon	75.105	Q
3	Constanza Jaramillo	Colombia	Wakana	72.158	Q
4	Marisa Festerling	United States	Big Tyme	72.026	Q
5	Thomas Dvorak	Canada	Viva's Saleiri W	71.711	Q
6	Yvonne Losos de Muñiz	Dominican Republic	Dondolo Las Marismas	71.369	Q
7	Tina Irwin	Canada	Winston	70.737	Q
8	Bernadette Pujals	Mexico	Iusa Rolex	70.369	Q
9	Marco Bernal	Colombia	Farewell	70.237	Q
10	Cesar Parra	United States	Grandioso	69.526	Q
11	Crystal Kroetch	Canada	Lymrix	68.790	Q
12	Mauro Pereira Junior	Brazil	Tulum Comando Sn	68.737	Q
13	Luiza Almeida	Brazil	Pastor	68.237	Q
14	Omar Zayrik	Mexico	Lord	67.816	Q
15	Mario Roberto Vargas	Chile	Tejas Verdes Tylov	67.316	Q
16	Samira Uemura	Dominican Republic	Royal Affair	67.079	Q
17	Rogerio Clementino	Brazil	Sardento do Top	67.000	Q
17	Antonio Rivera	Mexico	Naval	67.000	Q
19	Luis Denizard	Puerto Rico	Nalando	66.842	Q
20	Alejandro Gomez	Venezuela	Revenge	66.632	Q
21	Maria Garcia	Colombia	Beckam	66.447	Q
22	Christa Dauber	Guatemala	Serafina	65.985	Q
23	Beatriz Torbay	Venezuela	Don Royal	65.632	Q
24	Juan Mauricio Sanchez	Colombia	First Fisherman	65.500	Q
25	Roberta Byng-Morris	Canada	Reiki Tyme	65.184	Q
26	Anne Egerstrom	Costa Rica	Amorino	64.790	Q
27	Jose Padilla	Mexico	Donnersberg	64.290	
28	Esther Mortimer	Guatemala	Viva's Veroveraar	64.079	
29	Gretchen Luttmann	Costa Rica	Dudrovnik	63.921	
30	Leandro Silva	Brazil	VDL Lácteur	63.895	
31	Carolina Espinosa	Ecuador	Amadeo	63.869	
32	George Fernandez Diaz	Dominican Republic	Bravo 19	63.316	
33	Silvia Roesch	Guatemala	Caracaol XXIV	62.447	
34	Karen Atala	Honduras	Weissenfels	61.237	
35	Irina Moleiro	Venezuela	Sambuca	61.211	
36	Max Piraino	Chile	Jaguar	61.158	
37	Gloriana Arauz	Costa Rica	Rhapsody	61.105	
38	Jessica McTaggart	Cayman Islands	Ray of Light	60.921	
39	Oscar Coddou	Chile	Tambo Merlin	60.816	
40	Maria Montalvo	Ecuador	Navargo	60.711	
41	Virginia Yarur	Chile	El Dorado	60.658	
42	Ursula Lange	Puerto Rico	Toftegardens Lobb	59.342	
43	Michelle Batalla Navarro	Costa Rica	Ferro	59.105	
44	Maria Arocha	Venezuela	Aristocrata	58.553	
45	Julio Cesar Mendoza Loor	Ecuador	Ivan	58.500	
46	Franchesca Liauw	Puerto Rico	GB Marko	58.447	
47	Vivian Andrea Schorpp	Guatemala	Messina	58.395	
	Pedro Manuel Almeida	Brazil	Viheste	WD	

=== Final rounds ===
Rank	Rider	Nation	Horse	Inter I Score	Rank	Inter I F Score	Rank	Total GPS+GPF Score
Gold	Steffen Peters	United States	Weltino's Magic	78.079	1	87.300	1	82.690
Silver	Heather Anderson Blitz	United States	Paragon	77.184	2	86.650	2	81.917
Bronze	Marisa Festerling	United States	Big Tyme	74.316	3	80.775	3	77.545
4	Thomas Dvorak	Canada	Viva's Saleiri W	73.079	4	77.300	4	75.190
5	Tina Irwin	Canada	Winston	70.842	10	77.225	5	74.034
6	Bernadette Pujals	Mexico	Iusa Rolex	72.605	5	74.850	8	73.728
7	Crystal Kroetch	Canada	Lymrix	71.000	9	76.325	6	73.663
8	Constanza Jaramillo	Colombia	Wakana	71.211	7	75.850	7	73.530
9	Mauro Pereira Junior	Brazil	Tulum Comando Sn	70.711	11	74.275	9	72.493
10	Marco Bernal	Colombia	Farewell	71.105	8	72.000	11	71.553
11	Yvonne Losos de Muñiz	Dominican Republic	Dondolo Las Marismas	70.342	12	70.250	12	70.296
12	Rogerio Clementino	Brazil	Sardento do Top	66.974	15	72.550	10	69.762
13	Antonio Rivera	Mexico	Naval	67.184	14	69.275	13	68.230
14	Omar Zayrik	Mexico	Lord	67.895	13	68.200	14	68.047
15	Alejandro Gomez	Venezuela	Revenge	66.737	17	66.725	15	66.731
16	Cesar Parra	United States	Grandioso	72.000	6	DNS	16	
17	Roberta Byng-Morris	Canada	Reiki Tyme	66.947	16			
18	Luis Denizard	Puerto Rico	Nalando	66.237	18			
19	Christa Dauber	Guatemala	Serafina	66.079	19			
20	Luiza Almeida	Brazil	Pastor	65.947	20			
21	Mario Roberto Vargas	Chile	Tejas Verdes Tylov	65.000	21			
22	Juan Mauricio Sanchez	Colombia	First Fisherman	64.026	22			
23	Samira Uemura	Dominican Republic	Royal Affair	62.500	23			
24	Beatriz Torbay	Venezuela	Don Royal	61.921	24			
25	Anne Egerstrom	Costa Rica	Amorino	60.474	25			
26	Maria Garcia	Colombia	Beckam	DNS	26			
