= Equestrian at the 2023 Pan American Games – Individual dressage =

Individual dressage at the 2023 Pan American Games
- Venue: Granaderos Regiment Equestrian School
- Dates: October 22 - October 25
- Competitors: 39 from 11 nations
- Winning score: 87.230

Medalists
Gold medal	Julio Mendoza Loor on Jewell's Goldstrike	Ecuador
Silver medal	João Victor Marcari on Feel Good VO	Brazil
Bronze medal	Anna Marek on Fire Fly	United States

The individual dressage competition of the equestrian events at the 2023 Pan American Games was held from October 22 to 25 at the Granaderos Regiment Equestrian School (Escuela de Equitación Regimiento Granaderos) in Quillota, Chile.

== Format ==
The first round of the individual dressage competition was the FEI Prix St. Georges Test. The Prix St. Georges Test consists of a battery of required movements that each rider and horse pair performs. Five judges evaluate the pair, giving marks between 0 and 10 for each element. The judges' scores are averaged to give a final score for the pair.

The top 25 individual competitors in that round advanced to the individual-only competitions, though each nation is limited to three pairs advancing. This second round consisted of an Intermediare I Test, which is a higher degree of difficulty. The 15 best pairs in the Intermediare I Test advance to the final round. That round consists of, the Intermediare I Freestyle Test, competitors design their own choreography set to music. Judges in that round evaluate the artistic merit of the performance and music as well as the technical aspects of the dressage. Final scores are based on the average of the Freestyle and Intermediare I Test results.

== Schedule ==
Date	Time	Round
October 22, 2023	11:00	Prix St-Georges / Grand Prix
October 23, 2023	11:00	Intermediate I / Grand Prix Special
October 25, 2023	11:00	Intermediate I Freestyle / Grand Prix Freestyle

== Officials ==
Appointment of Dressage judges was as follows:

Dressage

- (Sweden) Magnus Ringmark (Ground Jury President)
- (United States) Michael Osinski (Ground Jury Member)
- (Portugal) Carlos Lopes (Ground Jury Member)
- (Canada) Cara Whitham (Ground Jury Member)
- (Colombia) Cesar Torrente (Ground Jury Member)
- (United States) Janet Foy (Foreign Technical Delegate)

== Results ==
The results were as follows:

=== Qualification ===
Rank	Rider	Nation	Horse	PSG / GP		Int I / GPS		Total	Notes
Rank	Rider	Nation	Horse	Score	Rank	Score	Rank	Total	Notes
1	João Victor Oliva	Brazil	Feel Good VO	76.479	1	78.362	2	154.841	Q
2	Sarah Tubman	United States	First Apple	76.065	2	76.872	3	152.937	Q
3	Julio Mendoza Loor	Ecuador	Jewell's Goldstrike	73.935	5	78.617	1	152.552	Q
4	Renderson de Oliveira	Brazil	Fogoso Campline	75.304	3	74.936	5	150.240	Q
5	Anna Marek	United States	Fire Fly	74.891	4	74.489	7	149.380	Q
6	Christian Simonson	United States	Son of a Lady	73.382	6	74.971	4	148.353	
7	Yvonne Losos de Muñiz	Dominican Republic	Aquamarijn	72.326	10	73.277	8	145.603	Q
8	Svenja Grimm	Chile	Doctor Rossi	73.217	8	72.340	9	145.557	Q
9	Codi Harrison	United States	Katholt's Bossco	73.305	7	71.957	11	145.262	Q
10	Naïma Moreira-Laliberté	Canada	Statesman	72.739	9	72.021	10	144.760	Q
11	Camille Carier Bergeron	Canada	Sound of Silence 4	67.565	20	74.511	6	142.076	Q
12	Beatrice Boucher	Canada	Summerwood's Limei	71.147	11	70.471	14	141.618	
13	Mathilde Blais Tetreault	Canada	Fedor	70.391	12	71.128	12	141.519	Q
14	Virginia Yarur	Chile	Ronaldo	68.674	15	71.000	13	139.674	
15	Micaela Mabragaña	Argentina	Bradley Cooper	68.130	16	70.447	15	138.577	Q
16	Mario Vargas	Chile	Kadiene	68.029	17	70.412	16	138.441	Q
17	Manuel de Almeida	Brazil	Rosa Belle	69.369	13	68.894	17	138.263	
18	Carolina Cordoba Wolf	Mexico	Johnny Cash	69.059	14	68.441	21	137.500	Q
19	Paulo Cesar Dos Santos	Brazil	Fidel Da Sasa JE	67.804	19	68.638	18	136.442	Q
20	Patricia Ferrando	Venezuela	Honnaisseur SJ	66.956	22	68.553	19	135.509	Q
21	Gabriel Martin Armando	Argentina	San Rio	66.935	23	68.447	20	135.382	
22	Carlos Maldonado Lara	Mexico	Frans	67.823	18	66.971	25	134.794	Q
23	María Aponte	Colombia	Lord of the Dance	65.882	28	67.294	23	133.176	Q
24	María José Granja	Ecuador	Emiliano AP	66.294	25	66.382	26	132.676	
25	María Ugryumova	Mexico	Impaciente PH	64.978	32	67.596	22	132.574	Q
26	Andrea Vargas	Colombia	Homerus P	65.294	29	67.235	24	132.529	
27	Juliana Gutiérrez	Colombia	Flanissimo	66.029	26	66.059	28	132.088	
28	Fiorella Mengani	Argentina	Assirio D Atela	66.544	24	65.447	29	131.991	
29	Carlos Fernández	Chile	Heroe XXV	64.765	33	66.147	27	130.912	
30	Santiago Cardona	Colombia	Dostokewski	65.088	31	65.206	30	130.294	
31	Carolin Mallmann	Uruguay	Grison	67.196	21	62.766	33	129.962	
32	Marcos Ortiz	Mexico	Gentil	66.000	27	62.447	34	128.447	
33	Stephanie Engstrom Koch	Dominican Republic	Resperanzo	65.118	30	62.794	32	127.912	
35	María Florencia Manfredi	Argentina	Hand Up Chaparrita Z	63.353	35	63.529	31	126.882	
35	Ramón Beca	Uruguay	Darro Do Sobral	63.435	34	60.468	35	123.903	
	Carolina Espinosa	Ecuador	Findus K	EL					

=== Final round ===
Rank	Rider	Nation	Horse	GPF Score	Notes
1st place, gold medalist(s)	Julio Mendoza Loor	Ecuador	Jewell's Goldstrike	87.230	
2nd place, silver medalist(s)	João Victor Oliva	Brazil	Feel Good VO	86.160	
3rd place, bronze medalist(s)	Anna Marek	United States	Fire Fly	81.305	
4	Sarah Tubman	United States	First Apple	81.155	
5	Renderson de Oliveira	Brazil	Fogoso Campline	80.095	
6	Codi Harrison	United States	Katholt's Bossco	79.230	
7	Camille Carier Bergeron	Canada	Sound of Silence 4	78.915	
8	Svenja Grimm	Chile	Doctor Rossi	78.335	
9	Yvonne Losos de Muñiz	Dominican Republic	Aquamarijn	77.570	
10	Naïma Moreira-Laliberté	Canada	Statesman	77.130	
11	Patricia Ferrando	Venezuela	Honnaisseur SJ	75.255	
12	Mathilde Blais Tetreault	Canada	Fedor	74.195	
13	Micaela Mabragaña	Argentina	Bradley Cooper	72.995	
14	María Ugryumova	Mexico	Impaciente PH	72.565	
15	Paulo Cesar Dos Santos	Brazil	Fidel Da Sasa JE	71.175	
16	Mario Vargas	Chile	Kadiene	71.025	
17	Carolina Cordoba Wolf	Mexico	Johnny Cash	70.945	
18	María Aponte	Colombia	Lord of the Dance	70.400	
19	Carlos Maldonado Lara	Mexico	Frans	63.905	
