= Equestrian at the 2011 Pan American Games – Team dressage =

Team dressage at the 2011 Pan American Games
- Venues: Guadalajara Country Club; Hipica Club
- Dates: October 16
- Competitors: 47 from 12 nations

Medalists
Gold medal	Steffen Peters on Weltino's Magic; Heather Blitz on Paragon; Cesar Parra on Grandioso; Marisa Festerling on Big Tyme	United States
Silver medal	Thomas Dvorak on Viva's Salieri W Crystal Kroetch on Lymrix; Tina Irwin on Winston; Roberta Byng-Morris on Reiki Tyme	Canada
Bronze medal	Marco Bernal on Farewell; Constanza Jaramillo on Wakana; Juan Mauricio on First Fisherman; María Inés García on Beckam	Colombia

The team dressage equestrian event at the 2011 Pan American Games was held on October 16 at the Guadalajara Country Club in Guadalajara. The defending Pan American champion is Lauren Samms (on Sagacious HF), Katherine Poulin-Neff (on Brilliant too) and Christopher Hickey (on Regent) of the United States.

The United States won its record fourth straight team dressage title, while with the second and third-place finishes Canada and Colombia qualify a full dressage team to compete at the 2012 Summer Olympics in London, Great Britain (the United States has already qualified).

== Schedule ==
All times are Central Standard Time (UTC-6).

Date	Time	Round
October 16, 2011	9:00	First session
October 16, 2011	14:30	Final

== Results ==
47 competitors from 12 nations competed.

Rank	Country			Total
Rank	Rider	Horse	% Score	Total
1st place, gold medalist(s)	United States			75.754
1st place, gold medalist(s)	Steffen Peters	Weltino's Magic	80.132	75.754
1st place, gold medalist(s)	Heather Blitz	Paragon	75.105	75.754
1st place, gold medalist(s)	Cesar Parra	Grandioso	69.526#	75.754
1st place, gold medalist(s)	Marisa Festerling	Big Tyme	72.026	75.754
2nd place, silver medalist(s)	Canada			70.413
2nd place, silver medalist(s)	Thomas Dvorak	Viva Salieri's W	71.711	70.413
2nd place, silver medalist(s)	Crystal Kroetch	Lymrix	68.790	70.413
2nd place, silver medalist(s)	Tina Irwin	Winston	70.737	70.413
2nd place, silver medalist(s)	Roberta Byng-Morris	Reiki Tyme	65.184#	70.413
3rd place, bronze medalist(s)	Colombia			69.614
3rd place, bronze medalist(s)	Marco Bernal	Farewell	70.237	69.614
3rd place, bronze medalist(s)	Constanza Jaramillo	Wakana	72.158	69.614
3rd place, bronze medalist(s)	Juan Mauricio Sanzhez	First Fisherman	65.500#	69.614
3rd place, bronze medalist(s)	María Inés García	Beckam	66.447	69.614
4	Mexico			68.395
4	Marcos Ortiz	Sjoery Bantha	*	68.395
4	Antonio Rivera	Naval	67.000	68.395
4	Bernadette Pujals	Iusa Rolex	70.369	68.395
4	Omar Zayrik	Lord	67.816	68.395
4	Jose Luis Padilla	Donnersberg	64.290#	68.395
5	Brazil			67.991
5	Pedro Manuel Almeida	Viheste	WD	67.991
5	Leandro Silva	VDL Lácteur	63.895#	67.991
5	Luiza Almeida	Pastor	68.237	67.991
5	Rogerio Clementino	Sargento do Top	67.000	67.991
5	Mauro Pereira Junior	Tulum Comando SW	68.737	67.991
6	Dominican Republic			67.255
6	Yvonne Losos de Muñiz	Dondolo Las Marismas	71.369	67.255
6	Samira Uemura	Royal Affair	67.079	67.255
6	George Fernandez Diaz	Bravo 19	63.316	67.255
7	Venezuela			64.492
7	Alejandro Gomez	Revenge	66.632	64.492
7	Irina Moleiro	Sambuca	61.211	64.492
7	Beatriz Torbay	Don Royal	65.632	64.492
7	Maria Arocha	Aristocrata	58.553#	64.492
8	Guatemala			64.140
8	Esther Karen Mortimer	Viva's Veroveraar	64.079	64.140
8	Silvia Roesch	Caracol XXIV	62.447	64.140
8	Vivian Andrea Schorpp	Messina	58.395#	64.140
8	Christa Dauber	Serafino	65.895	64.140
9	Costa Rica			63.272
9	Gloriana Herrera Arauz	Rhapsody	61.105	63.272
9	Michelle Batalla Navarro	Ferro	59.105#	63.272
9	Anne Egerstrom	Amorino	64.790	63.272
9	Gretchen Luttmann	Dudrovnik	63.921	63.272
10	Chile			63.097
10	Oscar Herman Coddou	Tambo Merlin	60.816	63.097
10	Max Piraino	Jaguar	61.158	63.097
10	Virginia Yarur	El Dorado	60.658#	63.097
10	Mario Roberto Vargas	Tejas Verdes Tylov	67.316	63.097
11	Puerto Rico			61.544
11	Franchesca Liauw	GB Marko	58.447	61.544
11	Luis Denizard	Nalando	66.842	61.544
11	Ursula Lange	Toftegardens Lobb	59.342	61.544
12	Ecuador			61.027
12	Carolina Espinosa	Amadeo	63.869	61.027
12	Julio Cesar Mendoza Loor	Ivan	58.500	61.027
12	Maria Elvira Montalvo	Navargo	60.711	61.027

# - Rider's score not counted in team total * - Named to team but did not compete
