= Equestrian events at the 2012 Summer Olympics – Qualification =

== Summary ==
Nation	Individual			Team			Total
Nation	Dressage	Eventing	Jumping	Dressage	Eventing	Jumping	Total
Australia	3	5	4	X	X	X	12
Austria	2	1					3
Azerbaijan			1				1
Argentina			2				2
Belarus		2					2
Belgium	1	5	4		X	X	10
Bermuda			1				1
Brazil	1	5	4		X	X	10
Canada	3	5	4	X	X	X	12
Chile			4			X	4
Colombia			2				2
Denmark	4			X			4
Ecuador		1					1
Egypt			1				1
Finland	1						1
France	1	5	4		X	X	10
Germany	4	5	4	X	X	X	13
Great Britain	4	5	4	X	X	X	13
Ireland	1	5	2		X		8
Italy	1	2					3
Jamaica		1					1
Japan	1	5	2		X		8
Jordan			1				1
Morocco	1						1
Mexico			4			X	4
Netherlands	4	3	4	X	X	X	11
Norway	1						1
New Zealand	2	5			X		7
Poland	3	1		X			4
Portugal	1		1				1
Russia		2	1				3
Saudi Arabia			4			X	4
South Africa		1					1
Spain	3			X			3
Sweden	3	5	4	X	X	X	12
Switzerland			4			X	4
Syria			1				1
Thailand		1					1
Ukraine	1		4			X	5
United States	4	5	4	X	X	X	13
Total: 40 NOCs	50	75	75	10	13	15	200

== Dressage ==
An NOC may enter 3 athletes if they qualified for the team competition. The quota places for top ranked riders in the geographic groups must go to riders from nations without a qualified team. The additional individual qualifying spots are based on the FEI Ranking and can go to any NOC, up to a maximum of 4 riders. If a team obtains 3 individual quota places, it may also be allowed to enter the team competition.

=== Team ===
Event	Date	Venue	Vacancies	Qualified
Host Nation	–		1	Great Britain
World Equestrian Games	Sep 25 – Oct 10, 2010	(United States) Lexington	3	Netherlands; Germany; United States
European Championship Groups A, B & C	Aug 17 – 21, 2011	(Netherlands) Rotterdam	3	Sweden; Spain; Denmark
Pan-American Games Group D/E	Oct 14 – 30, 2011	(Mexico) Guadalajara	1	Canada; ~~Colombia~~**
Group F/G Qualifiers	October 28, 2011	(Australia) Sydney	1	Australia; ~~New Zealand~~*
Group F/G Qualifiers	November 2, 2011	(Netherlands) Ermelo	1	Australia; ~~New Zealand~~*
Composite Teams				Poland*
TOTAL			9	

=== Individual ===
FEI Rankings (March 1, 2012)	Vacancies	Qualified
Team Members	27	
FEI Olympic Athletes Ranking – Dressage (established March 1, 2012)
Top Ranked Group A (North Western Europe)	1	Norway
Top Ranked Group B (South Western Europe)	1	Austria
Top Ranked Group C (Central & Eastern Europe; Central Asia)	1	Ukraine
Top Ranked Group D (North America; English Caribbean)	1	~~Antigua and Barbuda~~***
Top Ranked Group E (Central & South America)	1	Brazil
Top Ranked Group F (Africa & Middle East)	1	Morocco
Top Ranked Group G (South East Asia, Oceania)	1	Japan
Additional	17	Germany; Italy; Great Britain; Portugal; Belgium; Poland; Poland; France; Netherlands; Finland; ~~New Zealand*~~; New Zealand*; Poland*; Ireland**; United States**; Austria**; Denmark***; Finland*
TOTAL	50	

* New Zealand withdrew its team and decided to nominate only two individual riders. As a result, Poland qualified a third individual rider and was admitted into the team competition. New Zealand later withdrew one of those individual quotas allowing Finland to qualify.

** No riders from the Colombian team reached the minimum qualification standard, so three individual quota places were added.

*** No riders from Antigua and Barbuda reached the minimum qualification standard, so one individual quota place was added.

== Eventing ==
An NOC may enter up to 5 athletes if they qualified for the team competition. Individual qualification quota places may only go to nations without a qualified team, up to a maximum of 5. Should an NOC obtain 3 or more quota places in this manner, it may be allowed to participate in the team competition. The Netherlands, Australia and Ireland have qualified a team by this route.

=== Team ===
Team Competition	Date	Venue	Vacancies	Qualified
Host Nation	–		1	Great Britain
World Equestrian Games	Sep 25 – Oct 10, 2010	(United States) Lexington	5	Canada; New Zealand; United States; Germany; Belgium
European Eventing Championship Groups A, B & C	Aug 25 – 28, 2011	(Germany) Luhmühlen	2	France; Sweden
Pan-American Games Group D/E	Oct 13 – 30, 2011	(Mexico) Guadalajara	1	Brazil; ~~Argentina~~*
FEI Group F/G Eventing championship	Sep 8 – 11 2011	(United Kingdom) Blenheim (Oxon)	1	Japan
Qualification through multiple individual qualifications	-	-	3	Australia; Ireland; Netherlands
TOTAL			13	

=== Individual ===
FEI Rankings (March 1, 2012)	Vacancies	Qualified
Team Members	up to 50	
Top Ranked Group A (North Western Europe)	1	Netherlands
Top Ranked Group B (South Western Europe)	1	Italy
Top Ranked Group C (Central & Eastern Europe; Central Asia)	1	Belarus
Top Ranked Group D (North America; English Caribbean)	1	Jamaica
Top Ranked Group E (Central & South America)	1	Ecuador
Top Ranked Group F (Africa & Middle East)	1	South Africa
Top Ranked Group G (South East Asia, Oceania)	1	Australia
Additional	13+5*	Australia; Australia; Australia; Australia; Netherlands; Netherlands; Thailand; Italy; Ireland; Austria; Ireland; Russia; Ireland; Ireland*; Poland*; Ireland*; Belarus*; Russia*
TOTAL	75	

* Argentina withdrew its team.

== Jumping ==
An NOC may enter up to 4 athletes if they qualified for the team competition. Individual qualification quota places may only go to nations without a qualified team, up to a maximum of 2.

=== Team ===
Team Competition	Date	Venue	Vacancies	Qualified
Host Nation	–		1	Great Britain
World Equestrian Games 5 best ranked teams	Sep 25 – Oct 10, 2010	(United States) Lexington	5	Germany; France; Belgium; Brazil; Canada
World Equestrian Games – best Group C or G team	Sep 25 – Oct 10, 2010	(United States) Lexington	1	Australia
Best Group C or G team from the 2011 FEI selected Olympic Qualification event	July 10, 2011	(Germany) Aachen	1	Ukraine
European Jumping Championship Groups A & B	Sep 13 – 18, 2011	(Spain) Madrid	3	Netherlands; Sweden; Switzerland
Pan-American Games	Oct 13 – 30, 2011	(Mexico) Guadalajara	3	United States; Mexico; Chile
Best combined score from World Equestrian Games and 2011 FEI selected Olympic Qualification event (Group F)	Dec 27 – 30, 2011	(Qatar) Doha	1	Saudi Arabia
TOTAL			15	

=== Individual ===
Individual Competition	Date	Venue	Vacancies	Qualified
Team members			60	–
World Equestrian Games, Group F	Sep 25 – Oct 10, 2010	(United States) Lexington	2	Egypt; Syria
World Equestrian Games, Group G	Sep 25 – Oct 10, 2010	(United States) Lexington	1	Japan
Group G FEI Select Olympic Qualification event	July 10, 2011	(Germany) Aachen	1	Japan
Pan-American Games, Group D	Oct 13 – 30, 2011	(Mexico) Guadalajara	1	Bermuda
Pan-American Games, Group E	Oct 13 – 30, 2011	(Mexico) Guadalajara	4	Colombia; Colombia; Argentina; Argentina
Group F FEI Select Olympic Qualification event	Dec 27 – 30, 2011	(Qatar) Doha	1	Jordan
Olympic Qualification Ranking, Group A & B	March 1, 2012	–	3	Ireland; Ireland; Portugal
Olympic Qualification Ranking, Group C	March 1, 2012	–	2	Azerbaijan; Russia
TOTAL			75	
