= Equestrian at the 2015 Pan American Games – Qualification =

== Qualification system ==
A quota of 150 equestrian riders (45 dressage, 50 eventing and 55 show jumping) will be allowed to qualify. A maximum of twelve athletes can compete for a nation across all events (with a maximum of four per event). Athletes qualified through various qualifying events and rankings. The current qualification standings after the Central American and Caribbean Games:

== Qualification summary ==
Nation	Individual			Team			Total
Nation	Dressage	Eventing	Jumping	Dressage	Eventing	Jumping	Total
Argentina	4	4	4	X	X	X	12
Barbados			1				1
Bermuda	1		2				3
Brazil	4	4	4	X	X	X	12
Canada	4	4	4	X	X	X	12
Chile	4	4	4	X	X	X	12
Colombia	4	4	4	X	X	X	12
Costa Rica	3			X			3
Dominican Republic	1		2				3
Ecuador	2	4	2		X		8
El Salvador		2					2
Guatemala	4	4	4	X	X	X	12
Honduras	1						1
Mexico	4	4	4	X	X	X	12
Paraguay			1				1
Peru			1				1
Puerto Rico	1	1	2				4
United States	4	4	4	X	X	X	12
Uruguay	1	4	4		X	X	9
Venezuela	2	4	4		X	X	10
Total: 20 NOCs	43	47	55	9	11	10	147

== Dressage ==
9 teams of four (or three) athletes each will qualify, along with nine athletes as individuals (with a maximum of two per NOC), for a total of 45. A nation with at least three qualified athletes, may enter the team event as well.

=== Team ===
Event	Date	Venue	Vacancies	Qualified
Host Nation	—N/a	—N/a	1	Canada
2014 South American Games	March 8 – 11	(Chile) Santiago	3	Brazil; Argentina; Chile
2014 FEI World Equestrian Games	August 25 – 29	(France) Caen	1^{1}	United States
2014 Central American and Caribbean Games	November 16 – 19	(Mexico) Veracruz	4^{1}	Mexico; Colombia; Guatemala; Costa Rica*
TOTAL			9	

- Costa Rica only entered 3 athletes.

=== Individual ===
Event	Date	Venue	Vacancies	Qualified
Team members	—N/a	—N/a	36	
2014 South American Games	March 8 – 11	(Chile) Santiago	3	Ecuador; Uruguay; Ecuador
2014 FEI World Equestrian Games	August 25 – 29	(France) Caen	0^{2}	–
2014 Central American and Caribbean Games	November 16 – 19	(Mexico) Veracruz	6^{2}	Puerto Rico; Dominican Republic; Venezuela; Venezuela; Bermuda; Honduras
TOTAL			45	

== Eventing ==
11 teams of four athletes each will qualify, along with six athletes as individuals (with a maximum of two per NOC) for a total of 50.

=== Team ===
Event	Date	Venue	Vacancies	Qualified
Host Nation	—N/a	—N/a	1	Canada
2014 South American Eventing Championship	October 31 – November 2	(Brazil) Barretos	4	Brazil; Chile; Argentina; Uruguay
2014 Central American and Caribbean Games	November 21 – 23	(Mexico) Veracruz	4	Guatemala; Mexico; Colombia; Venezuela
Top two teams in Eventing athletes ranking list	March 12, 2015	—N/a	2	United States; Ecuador
Composite team	—N/a	—N/a	1	~~El Salvador~~
TOTAL			11	

=== Individual ===
Event	Date	Venue	Vacancies	Qualified
Team members	—N/a	—N/a	44	
2014 South American Eventing Championship	October 31 – November 2	(Brazil) Barretos	0^{3}	–
2014 Central American and Caribbean Games	November 21 – 23	(Mexico) Veracruz	~~2~~ 1	El Salvador; ~~Costa Rica~~
Top two individuals in Eventing athletes ranking list	March 12, 2015	—N/a	2	Puerto Rico; El Salvador
Reallocation	March 12, 2015	—N/a	0	~~Costa Rica~~; ~~Costa Rica~~; ~~El Salvador~~; ~~El Salvador~~^{3}
TOTAL			47	

== Jumping ==
11 teams of four athletes each will qualify, along with eleven athletes as individuals, for a total of 55.

=== Team ===
Event	Date	Venue	Vacancies	Qualified
Host Nation	—N/a	—N/a	1	Canada
2014 South American Games	March 13 – 16	(Chile) Santiago	3	Chile; Brazil; Argentina; ~~Peru~~
2014 Central American and Caribbean Games	November 26 – 29	(Mexico) Veracruz	4	Venezuela; Colombia; Guatemala; Mexico
Top two ranked teams in the Longines rankings	March 12, 2015	—N/a	2	United States; Uruguay
TOTAL			11	

=== Individual ===
Event	Date	Venue	Vacancies	Qualified
Team members	—N/a	—N/a	44	
2014 South American Games	March 13 – 16	(Chile) Santiago	4^{4}	Ecuador; Ecuador; ~~Paraguay~~; ~~Paraguay~~; Peru; Peru
2014 Central American and Caribbean Games	November 26 – 29	(Mexico) Veracruz	4	Dominican Republic; Dominican Republic; Puerto Rico; Barbados
Top ranked individual from Group IV in the Longines rankings	March 12, 2015	—N/a	1	Bermuda
Top two ranked individuals from the rest of the Americas	March 12, 2015	—N/a	2^{4}	Bermuda; ~~Costa Rica~~; Puerto Rico; ~~El Salvador~~
TOTAL			55	

== End notes ==
1. Only one eligible team competed at the World Equestrian Games. This meant the second team slot was reallocated to the Central American and Caribbean Games, as no there were no other teams that contested the South American Games. This meant four team slots (as opposed to three) were available at those games.
2. Only one eligible athlete (from Colombia) competed at the World Equestrian Games. This meant the two remaining individual slots were reallocated, to the Central American and Caribbean Games. This meant five individual slots (as opposed to three) were available at those games. Colombia later won a team spot at the Central American and Caribbean Games, meaning the a sixth individual quota was available at the said games.
3. El Salvador qualified four athletes individually, and will be allowed to enter a composite eventing team as well. However it rejected two quotas, and this cannot enter in the team competition.
4. Only three individual spots were eligible at the South American games. The fourth spot was transferred to the world rankings.
