= Hope Baldwin McCormick =

American socialite, philanthropist, and politician

Member of the Illinois House of Representatives

Personal details
- Born: July 9, 1919 Bedford Hills, New York, US
- Died: July 13, 1993 (aged 74) Chicago, Illinois, US
- Resting place: Graceland Cemetery
- Party: Republican
- Spouse: Brooks McCormick (m. 1940)
- Education: Ethel Walker School

Hope Baldwin McCormick (July 9, 1919 – July 13, 1993) was an American socialite, philanthropist, and politician.

== Biography ==
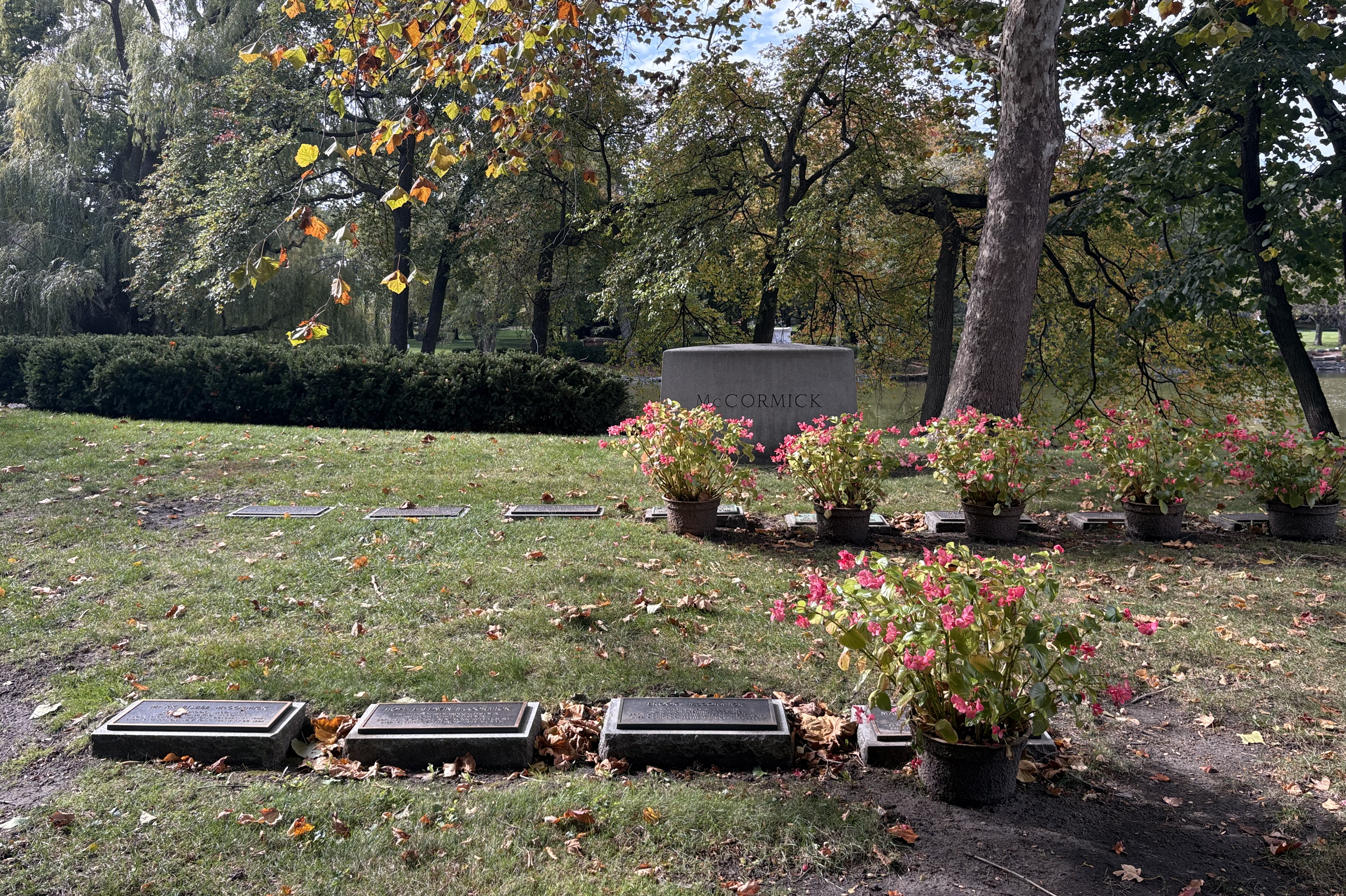
McCormick's grave (front row, second from left) at Graceland Cemetery

Born in Bedford Hills, New York, McCormick went to Ethel Walker School in Simsbury, Connecticut. In 1940, she married Brooks McCormick who was the executive vice president of the International Harvester Company. McCormick was also involved with civic and community affairs in Chicago, Illinois.

She was involved with the Republican Party. McCormick served in the Illinois House of Representatives from 1965 to 1967. She was elected as an at-large representative because of problems with reapportionment. In 1971, she was the Illinois State Committeewoman to the Republican National Convention.

McCormick died at her home in Chicago after suffering from a brief illness, and was buried at Graceland Cemetery.
