= Equestrian at the 2019 Pan American Games – Team dressage =

Team dressage at the 2019 Pan American Games
- Venues: Club Militar La Molina
- Dates: July 28–29
- Competitors: 27 from 8 nations
- Winning score: 440.111

Medalists
Gold medal	Lindsay Kellock on Floratina; Tina Irwin on Laurencio; Naïma Moreira-Laliberté on Statesman; Jill Irving on Degas 12; Canada
Silver medal	Nora Batchelder on Faro Sqf; Jennifer Baumert on Handsome; Sarah Lockman on First Apple; United States
Bronze medal	Leandro Silva on Dicaprio; João dos Santos on Carthago Comando SN; João Oliva on Biso das Lezirias; Pedro Almeida on Aoleo; Brazil

The team dressage competition of the equestrian events at the 2019 Pan American Games was held on July 28 and July 29 at the Equestrian Club Militar La Molina in Lima.

== Schedule ==
Date	Time	Round
July 28, 2019	9:00	Grand Prix
July 29, 2019	8:30	Grand Prix Special

== Results ==
37 competitors from 10 nations competed.

Rank	Nation	Name	Horse	Grand Prix			Grand Prix Special			Total
Rank	Nation	Name	Horse	Individual	Team	Rank	Individual	Team	Rank	Total
1st place, gold medalist(s)	Canada	Lindsay Kellock; Tina Irwin; Naïma Moreira-Laliberté; Jill Irving	Floratina; Laurencio; Statesman; Degas 12	73.176; 73.735; 72.913* #68.391	219.824	2	73.147; 73.853; 73.287* #67.851	220.287	1	440.111
2nd place, silver medalist(s)	United States	Nora Batchelder; Jennifer Baumert; Sarah Lockman	Faro Sqf; Handsome; First Apple	71.441; 72.441; 76.088	219.970	1	71.529; 70.380; 75.912	217.821	2	437.791
3rd place, bronze medalist(s)	Brazil	João dos Santos; João Oliva; Leandro Silva; Pedro Almeida	Carthago Comando SN; Biso das Lezirias; Dicaprio; Aoleo	69.029; 66.618; 68.826* #64.826	204.473	3	69.265 #65.029; 67.798*; 67.160*	204.223	3	408.696
4	Mexico	Irvin Leiva; Jesús Palacios; Bernadette Pujals; Martha Del Valle	Pabellon; Tinto; Curioso XXV; Beduino Lam	#63.971; 65.529; 68.000*; 68.717*	202.246	4	#62.912; 64.647; 67.798*; 68.947*	201.392	4	403.638
5	Colombia	Santiago Cardona; Maria Aponte; Raul Corchuelo	Espartaco; Duke de Niro; Senorita 43	65.235; 64.647; 68.235	198.117	5	65.235; 65.971; 68.265	199.471	5	397.588
6	Peru	Kerstin Rojas; Eric Chaman; Monika von Wedemeyer	Feuertanzer; Catalina; Briar's Boy	65.647; 60.765; 62.265	188.677	6	60.941; 57.353; 60.941	179.235	6	367.912
	Argentina	Luis Zone; Fiorella Mengani; Vera Protzen	Faberge d'Atela; Assirio d'Atela; Wettkonig	#0.000; 64.441; 70.059	EL		did not advance			
	Chile	Bárbara Weber; Virginia Yarur; Carlos Fernández	Entusiasta; E Rava; Destinado LXVII	#0.000; 69.500; 64.676	EL		did not advance			
