= Equestrian at the 2023 Pan American Games – Team dressage =

Team dressage at the 2023 Pan American Games
- Venue: Granaderos Regiment Equestrian School
- Dates: October 23
- Competitors: 31 from 8 nations
- Winning score: 450.670

Medalists
Gold medal	Christian Simonson on Son of a Lady; Anna Marek on Fire Fly; Codi Harrison on Katholt's Bossco; Sarah Tubman on First Apple	United States
Silver medal	Paulo César Dos Santos on Fidel Da Sassa JE; Manuel Tavares de Almeida on Rosa Belle; Renderson Silva on Fogoso Campline; João Victor Marcari Oliva on Feel Good VO	Brazil
Bronze medal	Beatrice Boucher on Summerwood's Limei; Camille Carier Bergeron on Sound of Silence 4 Mathilde Blais Tetreault on Fedor; Naïma Moreira-Laliberté on Statesman	Canada

The team dressage competition of the equestrian events at the 2023 Pan American Games was held on October 23 at the Granaderos Regiment Equestrian School (Escuela de Equitación Regimiento Granaderos) in Quillota, Chile.

== Format ==
The first round of the team dressage competition was the FEI Prix St. Georges Test. The Prix St. Georges Test consists of a battery of required movements that each rider and horse pair performs. Five judges evaluate the pair, giving marks between 0 and 10 for each element. The judges' scores are averaged to give a final score for the pair.

The top 9 team competitors in that round advanced to the final round. This second round consisted of an Intermediare I Test, which is a higher degree of difficulty. The 9 best teams in the Intermediare I Test advance to the final round. That round consists of, the Intermediare I Freestyle Test, competitors design their own choreography set to music. Judges in that round evaluate the artistic merit of the performance and music as well as the technical aspects of the dressage. Final scores are based on the average of the Freestyle and Intermediare I Test results.

== Schedule ==
Date	Time	Round
October 23, 2023	11:00	Intermediate I / Grand Prix Special

== Results ==
31 competitors from 8 nations competed, with each nation being represented by four competitors, except Ecuador, which had three.

Rank	Nation	Name	Horse	Grand Prix			Intermediate I / Grand Prix Special			Total
Rank	Nation	Name	Horse	Individual	Team	Rank	Individual	Team	Rank	Total
1st place, gold medalist(s)	United States	Christian Simonson; Anna Marek; Codi Harrison; Sarah Tubman	Son of a Lady; Fire Fly; Katholt's Bossco; First Apple	73.382; 74.891; ~~73.305~~; 76.065	224.338	1	74.971; 74.489; ~~71.057~~; 76.872	226.332	1	450.670
2nd place, silver medalist(s)	Brazil	Paulo César Dos Santos; Manuel Tavares de Almeida; Renderson Silva; João Victor Marcari Oliva	Fidel Da Sassa JE; Rosa Belle; Fogoso Campline; Feel Good VO	~~67.804~~; 69.369; 75.304; 76.478	221.151	2	~~68.638~~; 68.894; 74.936; 78.362	222.192	2	443.343
3rd place, bronze medalist(s)	Canada	Beatrice Boucher; Camille Carier Bergeron; Mathilde Blais Tetreault; Naïma Moreira-Laliberté	Summerwood's Limei; Sound of Silence 4 Fedor; Statesman	71.147; ~~67.565~~; 70.391; 72.739	214.277	3	~~70.471~~; 74.511; 71.128; 72.021	217.660	3	431.937
4	Chile	Mario Vargas; Carlos Fernández; Virginia Yarur; Svenja Grimm	Kadiene; Héroe XXV; Ronaldo; Doctor Rossi	68.029; ~~64.765~~; 68.674; 73.217	209.920	4	70.412; ~~66.147~~; 71.000; 72.340	213.752	4	423.672
5	Argentina	María Florencia Manfredi; Fiorella Mengani; Micaela Mabragaña; Gabriel Martin Armando	Hand Up Chaparrita Z Assirio D Atela; Bradley Cooper; San Rio	~~63.353~~; 66.544; 68.130; 66.935	201.609	6	~~63.529~~; 65.447; 70.447; 68.447	204.341	5	405.950
6	Mexico	Carolina Cordoba; Carlos Maldonado; María Ugryumova; Marcos Santiago Ortiz	Johnny Cash; Frans; Impaciente PH; Gentil	69.059; 67.823; ~~64.978~~; 68.000	202.882	5	68.441; 66.971; 67.596; ~~62.447~~	203.008	6	405.890
7	Colombia	Santiago Cardona; Juliana Gutiérrez; Andrea Vargas; María Aponte	Dostojewski; Flanissimo; Homerus P Lord of the Dance	~~65.088~~; 66.029; 65.294; 65.882	197.205	7	~~65.206~~; 66.059; 67.235; 67.294	200.588	7	397.793
	Ecuador	María José Granja; Carolina Espinosa; Julio Mendoza Loor	Emiliano AP; Findus K Jewel's Goldstrike					~~66.294~~; ~~EL~~; ~~73.935~~		
