= Equestrian events at the 2011 Pan American Games =

- Venues: Guadalajara Country Club; Hipica Club; Santa Sofia Golf Club
- Dates: October 16–29, 2011
- Competitors: 152 from 20 nations

Equestrian competitions at the 2011 Pan American Games in Guadalajara, Mexico were held from October 16 to October 29 at the Guadalajara Country Club (dressage), Hipica Club (dressage/jumping) and Santa Sofia Golf Club (eventing). Each event was a qualify riders and horses for the 2012 Summer Olympics in London, Great Britain.

== Medal summary ==
Key

The host country is highlighted in lavender blue

=== Medal table ===
* Host nation (Mexico)

Rank	Nation	Gold	Silver	Bronze	Total
1	United States	5	3	2	10
2	Canada	1	2	0	3
3	Brazil	0	1	2	3
4	Colombia	0	0	1	1
4	Mexico*	0	0	1	1
Totals (5 entries)		6	6	6	18

=== Events ===
Event	Gold	Silver	Bronze
Individual dressage	Steffen Peters on Weltino's Magic; United States	Heather Blitz on Paragon; United States	Marisa Festerling on Big Tyme; United States
Team dressage	United States; Steffen Peters on Weltino's Magic; Heather Anderson Blitz on Paragon; Cesar Parra on Grandioso; Marisa Festerling on Big Tyme	Canada; Thomas Dvorak on Viva's Salieri W Crystal Kroetch on Lymrix; Tina Irwin on Winston; Roberta Byng-Morris on Reiki Tyme	Colombia; Marco Bernal on Farewell; Constanza Jaramillo on Wakana; Juan Mauricio on First Fisherman; María Inés García on Beckam
Individual jumping	Christine McCrea on Romantovich Take One; United States	Beezie Madden on Coral Reef Via Volo; United States	Bernardo Alves on Bridgit; Brazil
Team jumping	United States; Kent Farrington on Uceko; Beezie Madden on Coral Reef Via Volo; Christine McCrea on Romantovich Take One; McLain Ward on Antares F	Brazil; Álvaro de Miranda Neto on AD Norson; Bernardo Alves on Bridgit; Karina Johannpeter on SRF dragonfly de Joter; Rodrigo Pessoa on HH Ashley	Mexico; Antonio Maurer on Callao; Alberto Michan on Rosalía la Silla; Enrique González on Criptonite; Daniel Michan on Ragna T
Individual eventing	Jessica Phoenix on Pavarotti; Canada	Hannah Burnett on Harbour Pilot; United States	Bruce Davidson Jr on Absolute Liberty; United States
Team eventing	United States; Lynn Symansky on Donner; Hannah Burnett on Harbour Pilot; Jack Pollard on Schoensgreen Hanni; Bruce Davidson Jr on Absolute Liberty; Shannon Lilley on Ballingowan Pizazz	Canada; Selena O'Hanlon on Foxwood High; Rebecca Howard on Roquefort; Jessica Phoenix on Pavarotti; Hawley Bennett on Five O'clock Somewhere; James Atkinson on Gustav	Brazil; Jesper Martendal on Laid Jimmy; Marcelo Tosi on Eleda All Black; Marcio Jorge on Josephine MCJ; Ruy Fonseca Filho on Tom Bombadill Too; Serguei Fofanoff on Barabara TW

== Schedule ==
All times are Central Daylight Time (UTC-5).

Day	Date	Start	Finish	Event	Phase
Day 3	Sunday October 16, 2011	9:00	13:00	Team dressage	First session
Day 3	Sunday October 16, 2011	14:30	17:20	Team dressage	Final
Day 4	Monday October 17, 2011	9:00	13:00	Individual dressage	First session
Day 4	Monday October 17, 2011	14:30	17:00	Individual dressage	Second session
Day 6	Wednesday October 19, 2011	15:00	17:20	Individual dressage	Finals
Day 8	Friday October 21, 2011	9:00	13:00	Individual/Team eventing	First session (dressage)
Day 8	Friday October 21, 2011	14:00	17:30	Individual/Team eventing	Second session (dressage)
Day 9	Saturday October 22, 2011	11:00	15:00	Individual/Team eventing	Cross country competition
Day 10	Sunday October 23, 2011	12:00	14:00	Team eventing	Jumping competition/Finals
Day 10	Sunday October 23, 2011	15:30	16:20	Individual eventing	Jumping competition/Finals
Day 13	Wednesday October 26, 2011	14:00	16:30	Individual/Team jumping	First round
Day 14	Thursday October 27, 2011	10:00	13:00	Individual/Team jumping	Second event – first round
Day 14	Thursday October 27, 2011	14:00	17:20	Team jumping	Finals
Day 14	Thursday October 27, 2011	14:00	17:20	Individual jumping	Second event – second round
Day 16	Saturday October 29, 2011	12:00	13:30	Individual jumping	Third event – first round
Day 16	Saturday October 29, 2011	14:30	15:30	Individual jumping	Finals

== Qualification ==
There was a maximum of 130 competitors, and each NOC was allowed to enter a maximum of four athletes in dressage and five athletes each in eventing.

Nation	Individual			Team			Total
Nation	Dressage	Eventing	Jumping	Dressage	Eventing	Jumping	Total
Argentina	1	5	4		X	X	10
Bermuda			2				2
Brazil	4	3	3	X	X	X	12
Canada	4	5	4	X	X	X	13
Cayman Islands	1						1
Chile	4	5	4	X	X	X	13
Colombia	4	5	4	X	X	X	13
Costa Rica	4			X			4
Dominican Republic	3			X			3
Ecuador	4	3	4	X	X	X	11
El Salvador		1	2				3
Guatemala	4	5	4	X	X	X	12
Honduras	1						1
Mexico	4	5	4	X	X	X	13
Panama			1				1
Peru			4			X	4
Puerto Rico	3	1	3	X		X	7
Uruguay		2	4			X	5
United States	4	5	4	X	X	X	13
Venezuela	4	4	4	X	X	X	12
Total: 20 NOCs	49	49	55	12	10	13	152

== See also ==
- Equestrian events at the 2012 Summer Olympics
