= Wortz =

Wortz is a surname. Notable people with the surname include:

- Jennifer Wortz (fl. from 2017), American politician
- Melinda Wortz (1940–2002), American art historian, art critic, gallery director, and art collector
