= Anna Marek =

American equestrian

Personal information
- Nationality: American
- Born: April 14, 1989 (age 37)

Sport
- Country: United States
- Sport: Equestrianism
Medal record
Equestrian
Representing United States
Pan American Games
Gold medal – first place	2023 Santiago	Team dressage
Bronze medal – third place	2023 Santiago	Individual dressage

Anna Marek (born April 14, 1989) is an American equestrian. She represented the US at the 2023 Pan American Games in Santiago, Chile where she won team gold and individual bronze, which was her first major Championship representing her country. Marek runs an equestrian business in Dunnellon, Florida and has schooled several horses up to Grand Prix level.
