= Colony Club =

Social club in New York City

- Old Colony Club
- U.S. National Register of Historic Places
- New York State Register of Historic Places
- New York City Landmark
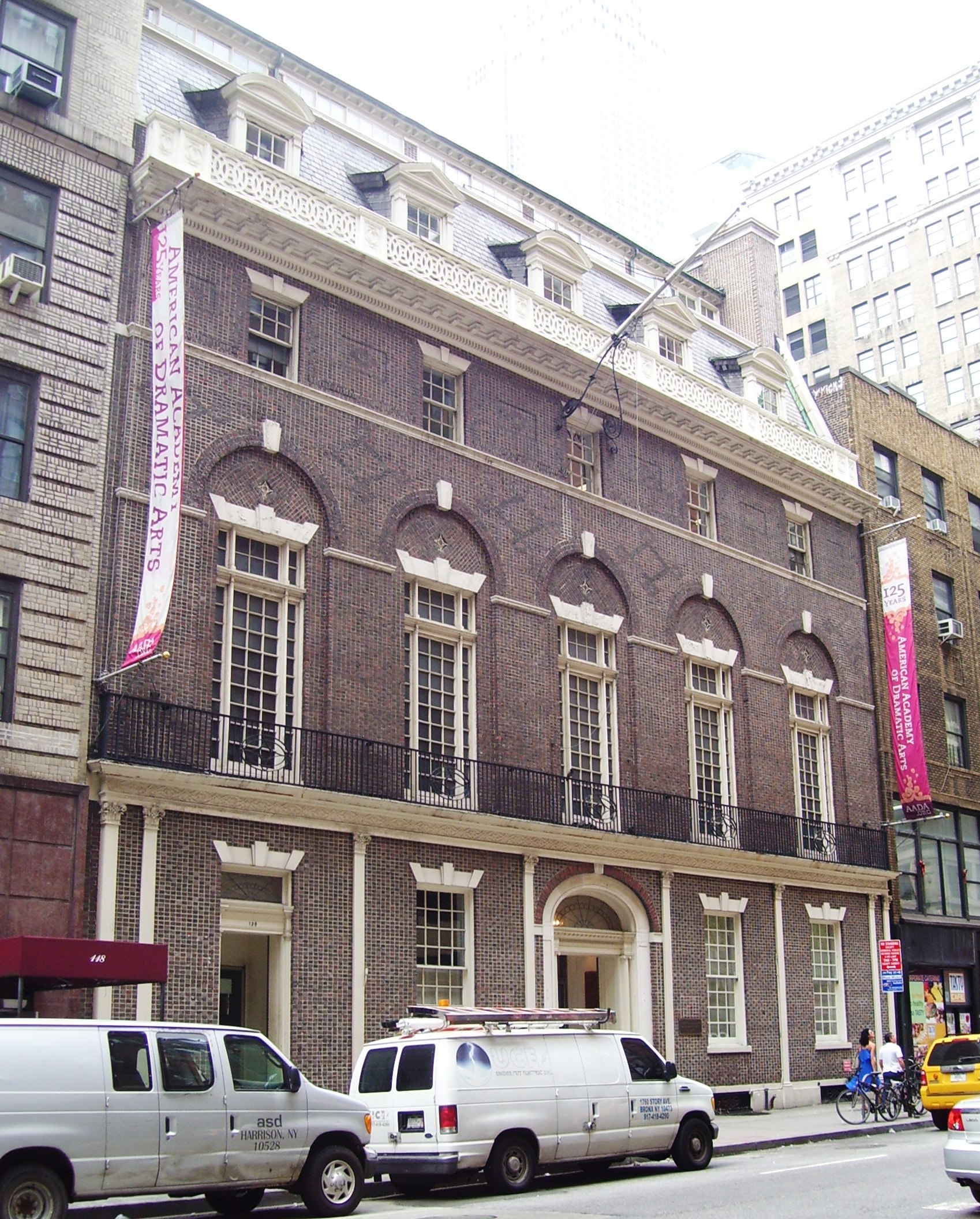
- The original Colony Club building on Madison Avenue

- Location within New York City
- Location: 62nd Street and Park Avenue; Manhattan, New York
- Coordinates: 40°44′44″N 73°59′5.6″W
- Built: 1904
- Architect: McKim, Mead & White; Kendall & Baldwin
- Architectural style: Colonial Revival, others
- NRHP reference No.: 80002706
- NYSRHP No.: 06101.000404
- NYCL No.: 0236

Significant dates
- Added to NRHP: April 23, 1980
- Designated NYSRHP: June 23, 1980
- Designated NYCL: May 17, 1966

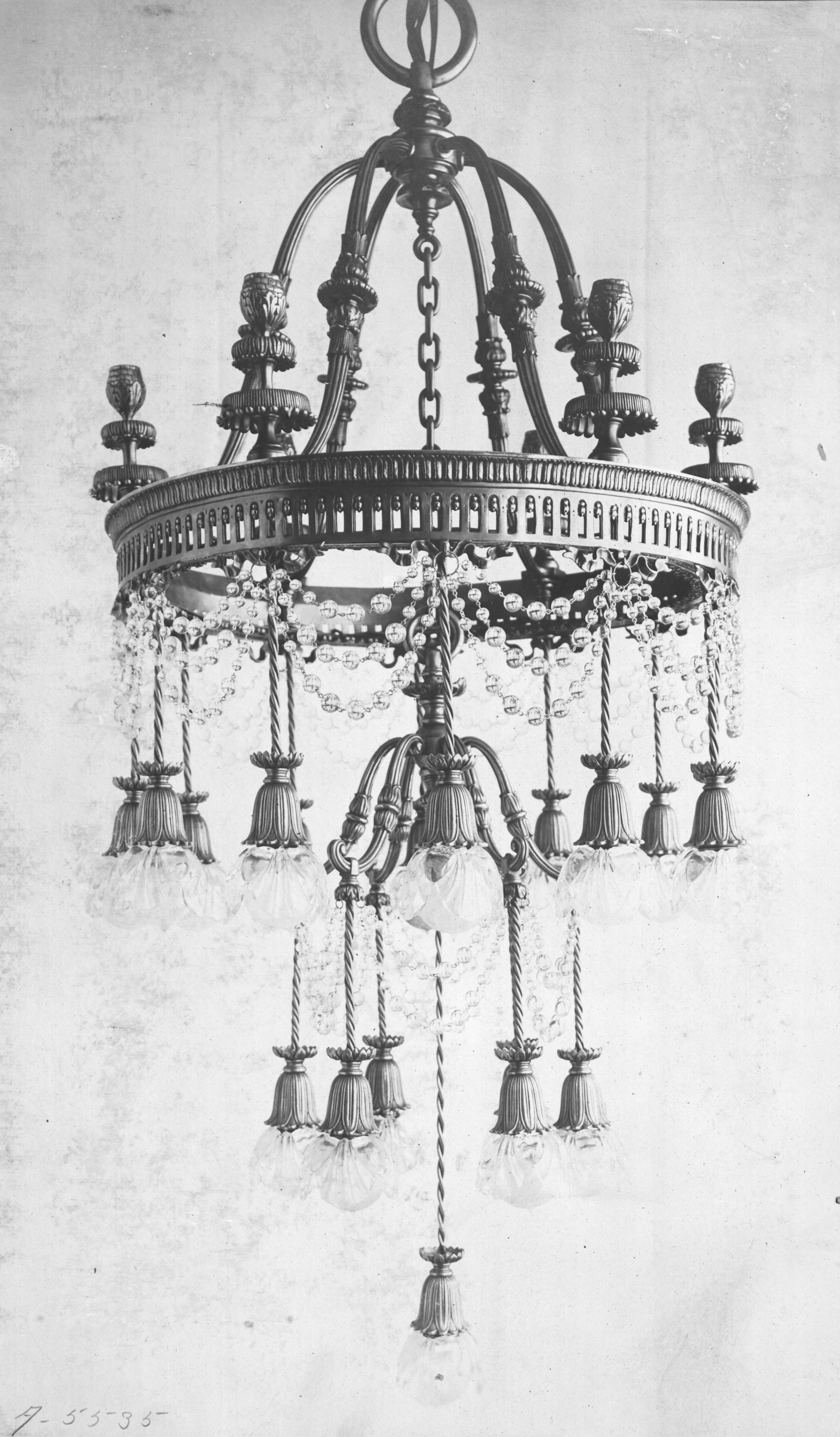
Chandelier by E. F. Caldwell & Co.

The Colony Club is a women-only private social club in New York City. Founded in 1903 by Florence Jaffray Harriman, wife of J. Borden Harriman, as the first social club established in New York City by and for women, it was modeled on similar gentlemen's clubs. Today, men are admitted as guests.

The Colony Club has EIN 13-0590080 under the category 501(c)(7) Social and Recreation Clubs. In 2024 it claimed $19,746,297 in total revenue and $22,164,448 in total assets. Its mission is "to operate as a private social club organized for the members' social pleasures."

== History ==
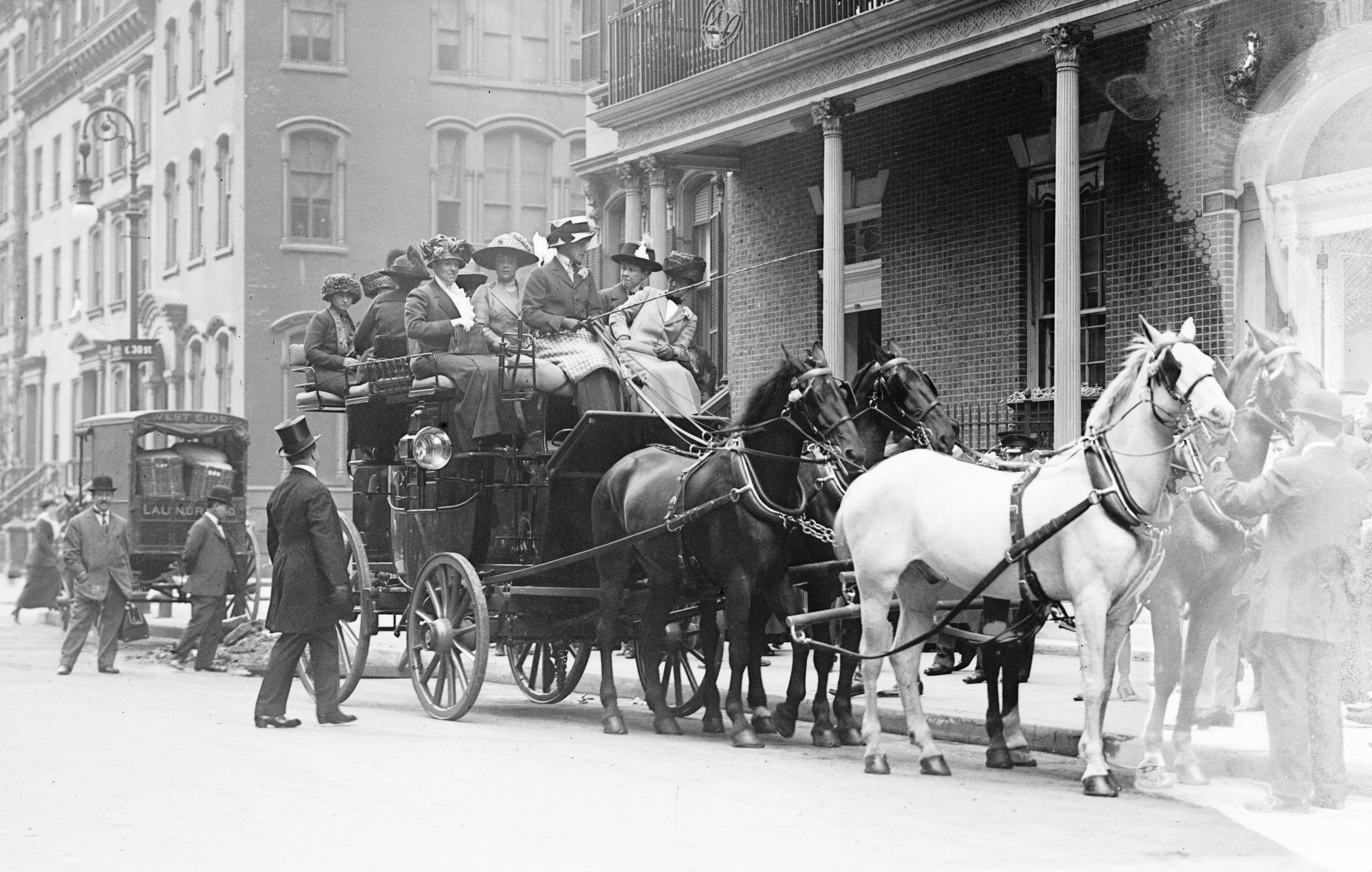
Coach leaving from the Colony Club in 1911, carrying Mrs. Thomas Hastings, Mrs. Iselin and Mrs. Loew

=== Original clubhouse ===
With other wealthy women, including Anne Tracy Morgan (a daughter of J.P. Morgan), Harriman raised $500,000, and commissioned Stanford White of McKim, Mead & White to build the original clubhouse, later known as the "Old Colony Club". This building – at 120 Madison Avenue, between East 30th and East 31st Streets on the west side of Madison – was built between 1904 and 1908 and was modelled on eighteenth-century houses in Annapolis, Maryland.

The interiors, which exist largely unchanged, were created by Elsie de Wolfe – later to become Lady Mendl – a former actress who had recently opened an interior-design business, and whose companion, the theatrical agent Elisabeth Marbury, was one of the club's founders. Stanford White was slain by Harry K. Thaw months before construction of the Colony Club was completed. The building was designed in the Federal Revival style, and has unusual brickwork done in a diaper pattern as a notable feature of its facade. The club and the street in front of it were often the site of large suffrage rallies sponsored by the Equal Franchise Society to which many members of the Club belonged.

The Old Colony Club was sold to Genevieve Garvan Brady after the club moved to its new location in 1916. Today, the building houses the East Coast headquarters of the American Academy of Dramatic Arts. It was awarded landmark status by the City of New York in 1966.

=== Second clubhouse ===
Second Colony Club House

The second clubhouse, located at 564 Park Avenue, also known as 51 East 62nd Street, on the northwest corner, was commissioned in 1913 and constructed from 1914 to 1916. It was designed by Delano & Aldrich in the Neo-Georgian style, with interiors designed by Elsie de Wolfe. The building has a marble base with red-brick and marble trim and columns for the upper floors. According to Andrew Dolkart:

This is not one of Delano & Aldrich's more elegant works in the Colonial idiom, perhaps because it was nearly impossible to create a well-proportioned design for a building with the complex spatial requirements of this club. The beautifully appointed interior included the lounges, dining rooms, and bedrooms common to social clubs, but also had a two-story ballroom, a basement swimming pool and spa that connected via an express elevator to a gymnasium on the fifth floor, two squash courts, servants' rooms (in 1925 there were thirteen female servants), and even a kennel where members could leave their pets.

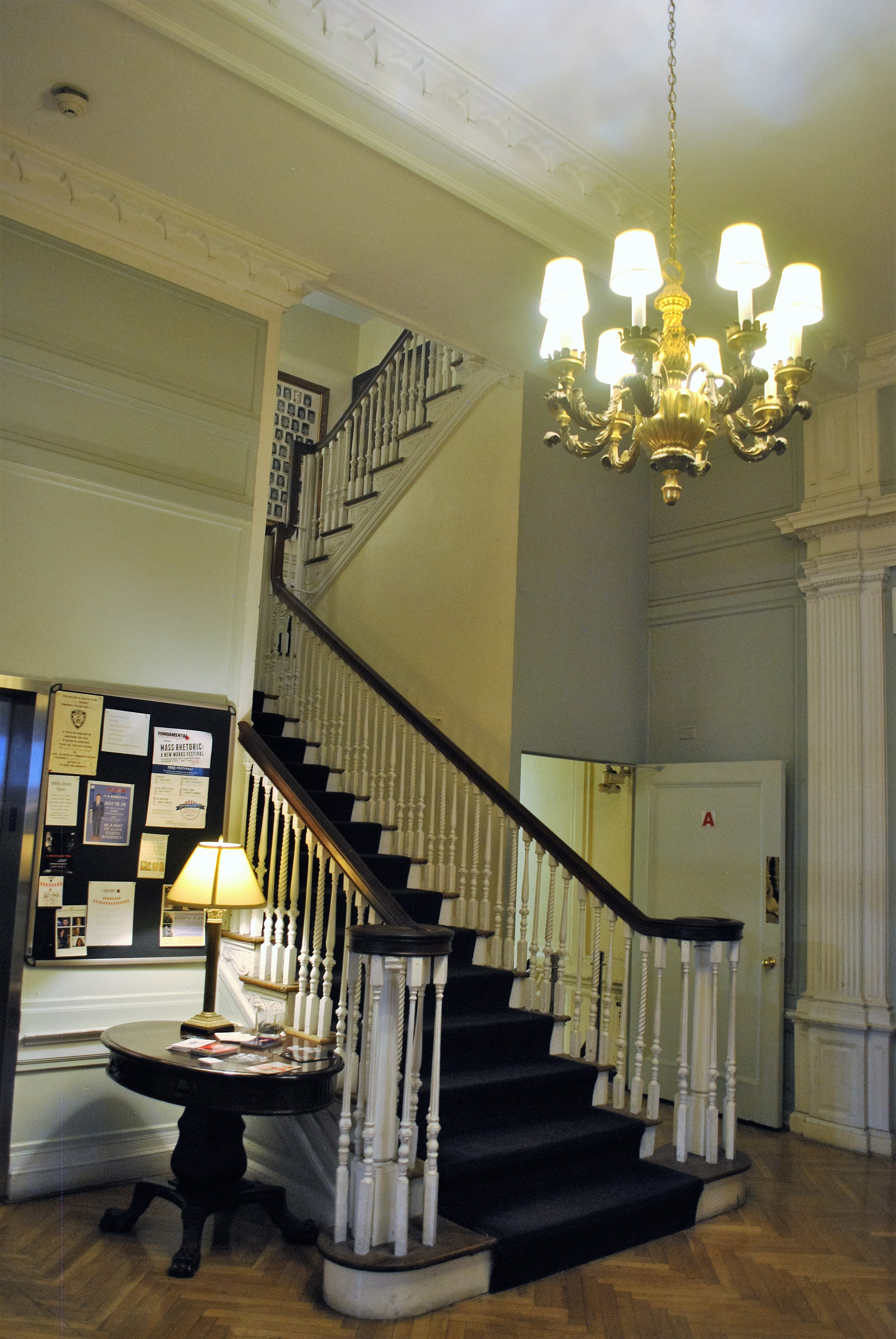
First Colony Club House, New York City, NY

In 1973, Secretary of State Henry Kissinger's birthday party was held at the Colony Club (among the guests were four couples whom Kissinger had ordered to be wiretapped). In 2007, memorial services for Brooke Astor were held there. The club continues its policy of women-only membership – new members must be recommended by current members.

The Club presently has approximately 2,500 members who have access to discussions, concerts, and wellness and athletic programs. The Clubhouse consists of seven stories, 25 guest bedrooms, three dining rooms, two ballrooms, a lounge, a squash court, an indoor pool, a fitness facility and three personal spa service rooms. Annual gross revenues are more than $10 million.

== Reciprocal Clubs ==
- Acorn Club (Philadelphia)
- Alexandra Club (Melbourne)
- Ausable Club (St. Huberts)
- Bald Peak Colony Club (Melvin Village)
- Cercle de l'Union Interalliee (Paris)
- Chilton Club (Boston)
- Hillsboro Club (Hillsboro Beach)
- Jupiter Island Club (Hobe Sound)
- Lansdowne Club (London)
- Metropolitan Club (San Francisco)
- Mill Reef Club (St. John's, Antigua)
- Mount Vernon Club (Baltimore)
- Mountain Lake (Lake Wales)
- Sloane Club (London)
- Springdale Hall Club (Camden)
- Sulgrave Club (Washington D.C.)
- Sunset Club (Seattle)
- The Casino (Chicago)
- The Francisca Club (San Francisco)
- The Garrett Club (Buffalo)
- The Lenox Club (Lenox)
- The Little Club (Gulf Stream)
- The Mid Ocean Club (Harrington Sound)
- The New Club (Edinburgh)
- The Queen's Club (Sydney)
- The Town Club (Pasadena)
- The West Chop Club of Martha's Vineyard (Vineyard Haven)
- Wianno Club (Osterville)
- Women's Athletic Club of Chicago (Chicago)

== Notable members ==
- Madeleine Talmage Force Astor – wife of John Jacob Astor IV
- Ambassador Robin Chandler Duke
- Jessica Garretson Finch, college president, founding member.
- Elisabeth Marbury
- Kathleen Troia McFarland, U.S. Deputy National Security Advisor
- Anne Morgan – a daughter of J. P. Morgan, and a founding member
- Frances Louisa Tracy Morgan – wife of J. P. Morgan
- Ruth Morgan, women's rights and peace activist, and president of the Colony Club in 1922
- Judith Peabody
- Emily K. Rafferty, former president Metropolitan Museum of Art
- Eleanor Roosevelt – resigned when the Club refused to consider Mrs. Henry Morgenthau Jr., wife of the Secretary of the Treasury under President Franklin D. Roosevelt, because she was Jewish.
- Abby Aldrich Rockefeller
- Julia Catlin Park Taufflieb – the first American woman to receive the Légion d'honneur in World War I for turning her chateau in northern France into a 300-bed hospital
- Florence Sloane Burden Tobin – president of the Colony Club
- Anne Harriman Vanderbilt – founding member
- Ava Lowle Willing – founding member
- Anne Bass
- Ann Macy Beha (Radloff) architect, preservationist, educator

== See also ==
- List of American gentlemen's clubs
- The Colony, a former restaurant near the Colony Club, sharing many of the same patrons
