= The Ethel Walker School =

Prep school in Simsbury, Connecticut, US

Location
- 230 Bushy Hill Road; Simsbury, Connecticut 06070; United States; 41°50′59″N 72°50′08″W

Information
- Type: Independent boarding and day college preparatory
- Motto: Latin: Nullas Horas Nisi Aureas (None But Golden Hours)
- Established: 1911 (115 years ago)
- Founder: Ethel Walker
- CEEB code: 070670
- Head of school: Meera Viswanathan
- Faculty: 32
- Grades: 7-12 plus postgraduate
- Gender: All-girls
- Enrollment: 225 (54% boarding, 46% day)
- Average class size: 12
- Student to teacher ratio: 6:1
- Campus size: 175 acres (71 ha)
- Houses: Suns; Dials
- Colors: Purple and yellow
- Athletics conference: NEPSAC; Founders League
- Endowment: $35 million
- Tuition: $79,900 (boarding) $57,600 (day)
- Revenue: $24.9 million
- Website: www.ethelwalker.org

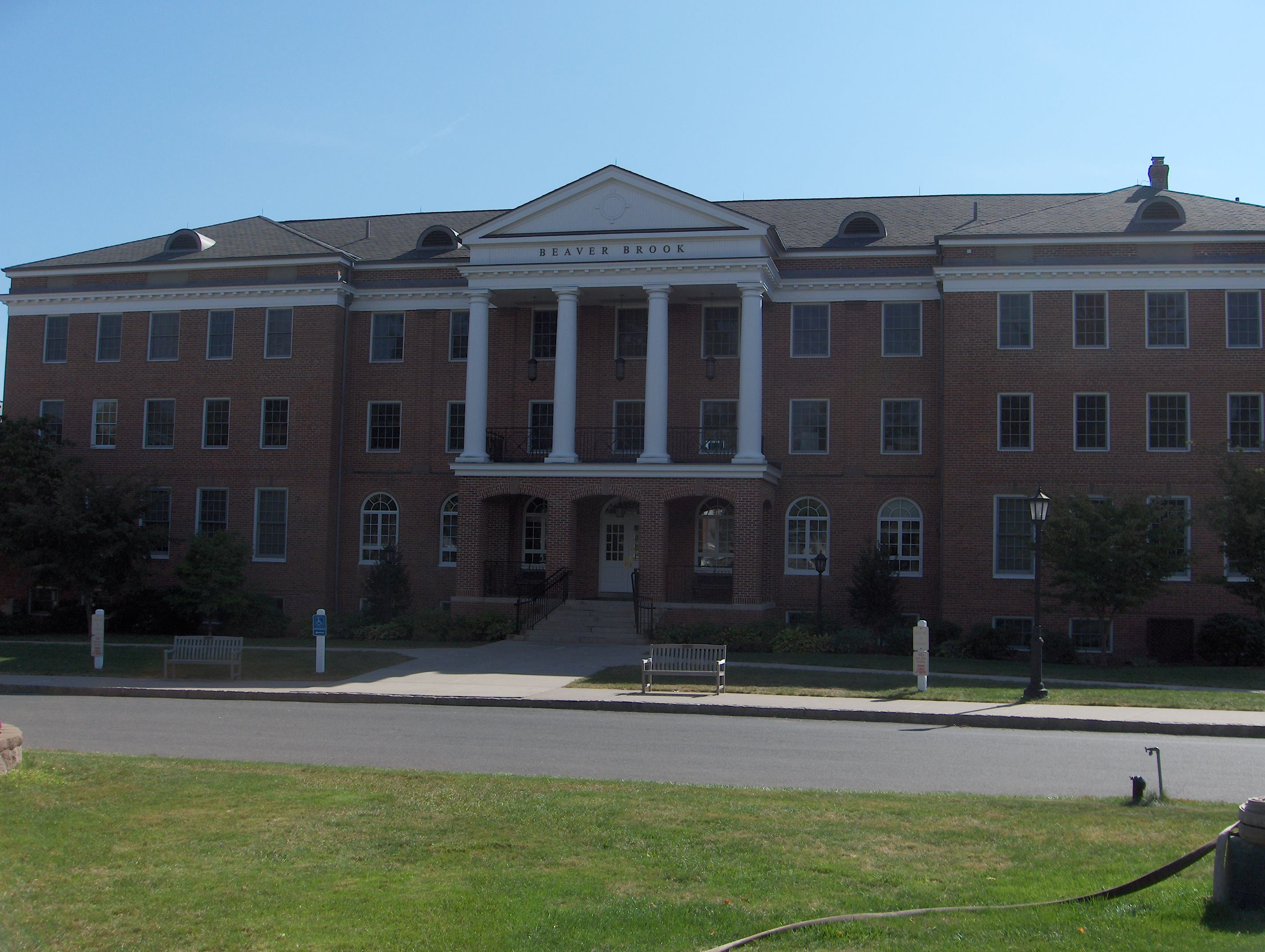
The Ethel Walker School campus

The Ethel Walker School, also commonly referred to as "Walker's", is a private, college preparatory, boarding and day school for girls in grades 7 through 12 plus postgraduate located in Simsbury, Connecticut.

== History ==
Ethel Walker, a graduate of Bryn Mawr College (Class of 1894), founded the school in 1911 in Lakewood, New Jersey, with a $10,000 loan and an initial class of ten students. Walker intended a rigorous college-preparatory curriculum at a time when, as she later recalled, "the general public thought girls would be physically ill if they studied." Students were required to pass half the College Board entrance examination to advance to their junior year.

In 1917, the school moved to the former estate of Walter Phelps Dodge in the Weatogue section of Simsbury. In 1919, the family of Emily Cluett, a student who had died in the influenza pandemic, donated funds to purchase additional Dodge properties for the school. Walker married Dr. E. Terry Smith in 1921 and stepped down as head of school, though she attended every commencement until her death in 1965.

In April 1933, two fires, suspected to be arson, destroyed the main classroom building and a dormitory, displacing 100 of the school's 174 students. Five earlier fires had been discovered and extinguished. The damage was estimated at $300,000. Due to Depression-era labor availability, the main building was rebuilt in six months. The school temporarily relocated to the Fishers Island Club on Fishers Island, New York during the reconstruction.

The school added a middle school division in 1991. In 1997, a $1 million gift from Ann Watson Bresnahan (Class of 1969) funded the Symington Science Center, named after her mother Ann Hemingway Symington (Class of 1936). In 2016, the school opened the Centennial Center, a 62,000-square-foot athletic facility with a double gymnasium, eight-lane pool, and squash courts, funded by a $50 million centennial campaign.

== Campus ==
The school occupies 175 acres (71 ha) in the Weatogue section of Simsbury, Connecticut, abutting over 400 acres (160 ha) of conserved land. The campus centers on Beaver Brook, the main academic building rebuilt after the 1933 fires, which houses classrooms, the Symington Science Center, and a dining hall.

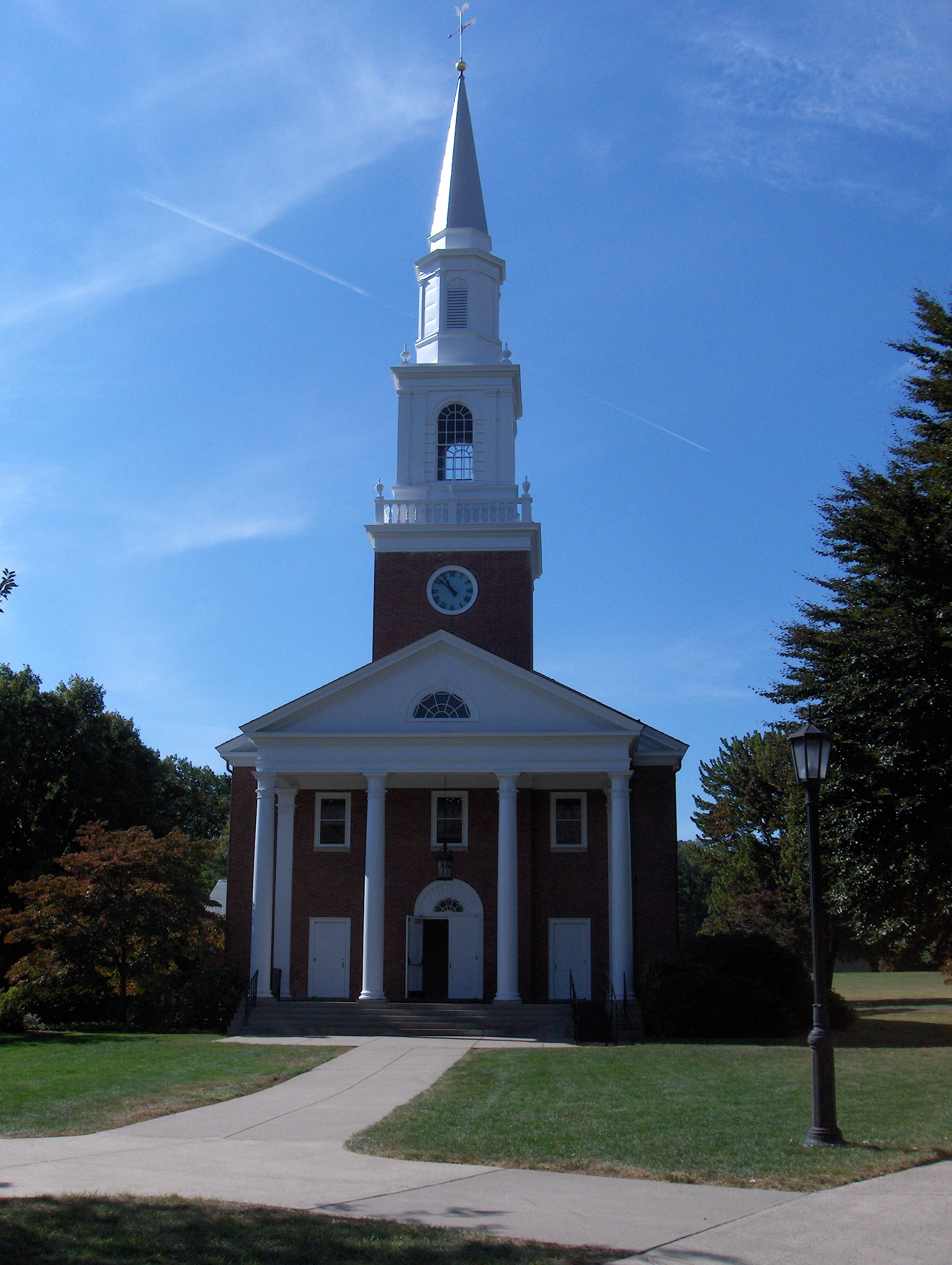
The school chapel

The Memorial Chapel contains an Aeolian-Skinner organ (Opus 1349). Ferguson Theatre, a 350-seat performing arts venue, opened in 1969.

The equestrian facilities, located across Bushy Hill Road on land that was part of the original Dodge estate, include the Frank O.H. Williams Barn and the Henderson Riding Ring, a lighted indoor arena. The barns are documented by Preservation Connecticut's Historic Barns survey as examples of English-style agricultural architecture from the Dodge estate era.

Between 2007 and 2014, the Town of Simsbury purchased 424 acres (172 ha) of adjacent land, known as the Ethel Walker Woods, for $11.1 million with assistance from the Trust for Public Land. The conserved land sits atop the Stratton Brook Aquifer, which supplies approximately 70 percent of Simsbury's drinking water.

== Athletics ==
The school is a member of the Founders League and NEPSAC. It fields 13 varsity sports including field hockey, soccer, lacrosse, basketball, swimming, squash, and tennis.

=== Equestrian ===
The equestrian program, established with the school's founding, is integrated into the athletic curriculum. Alumni of the program include Annie Peavy, who competed on the U.S. Para-Dressage Team at the 2016 Summer Paralympics in Rio de Janeiro.

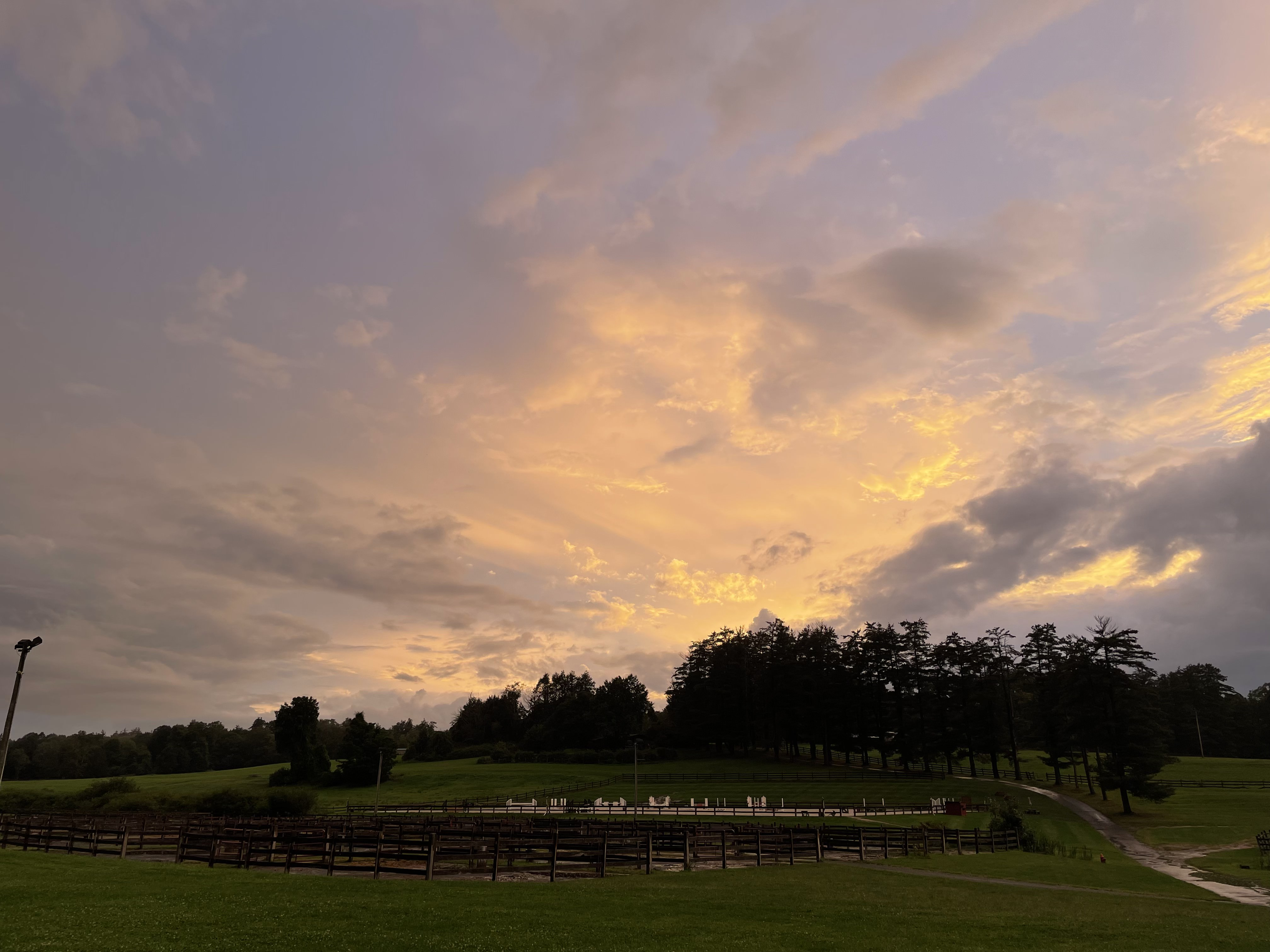
The outdoor equestrian ring

== Notable alumnae ==
- Frances Beinecke, President of the National Resources Defense Council
- Juanin Clay, actress
- Ethel du Pont, heiress and socialite
- Farahnaz Pahlavi, Princess of Pahlavi Iran, daughter of Mohammad Reza Pahlavi
- Judith Peabody, socialite and philanthropist
- Angela "Annie" Peavy, member of the U.S. Para-Dressage Team at the 2016 Olympics
- Georgia B. Ridder, American thoroughbred racehorse owner
- Ariana Rockefeller, model and fashion designer
- Mary L. Trump, clinical psychologist, businessperson, and author
- Sigourney Weaver, actress
- Abra Prentice Wilkin, philanthropist
- Melinda Wortz, art professor, gallery director
