= Manuel Almeida =

Manuel Almeida may refer to:

- Manuel de Almeida (1580–1646), native of Viseu and Jesuit missionary
- Manuel Almeida (equestrian) (born 1993), Brazilian equestrian
- Manuel Almeida Campos (born 1981), Portuguese gymnast
