= João Oliva =

Brazilian equestrian (born 1996)

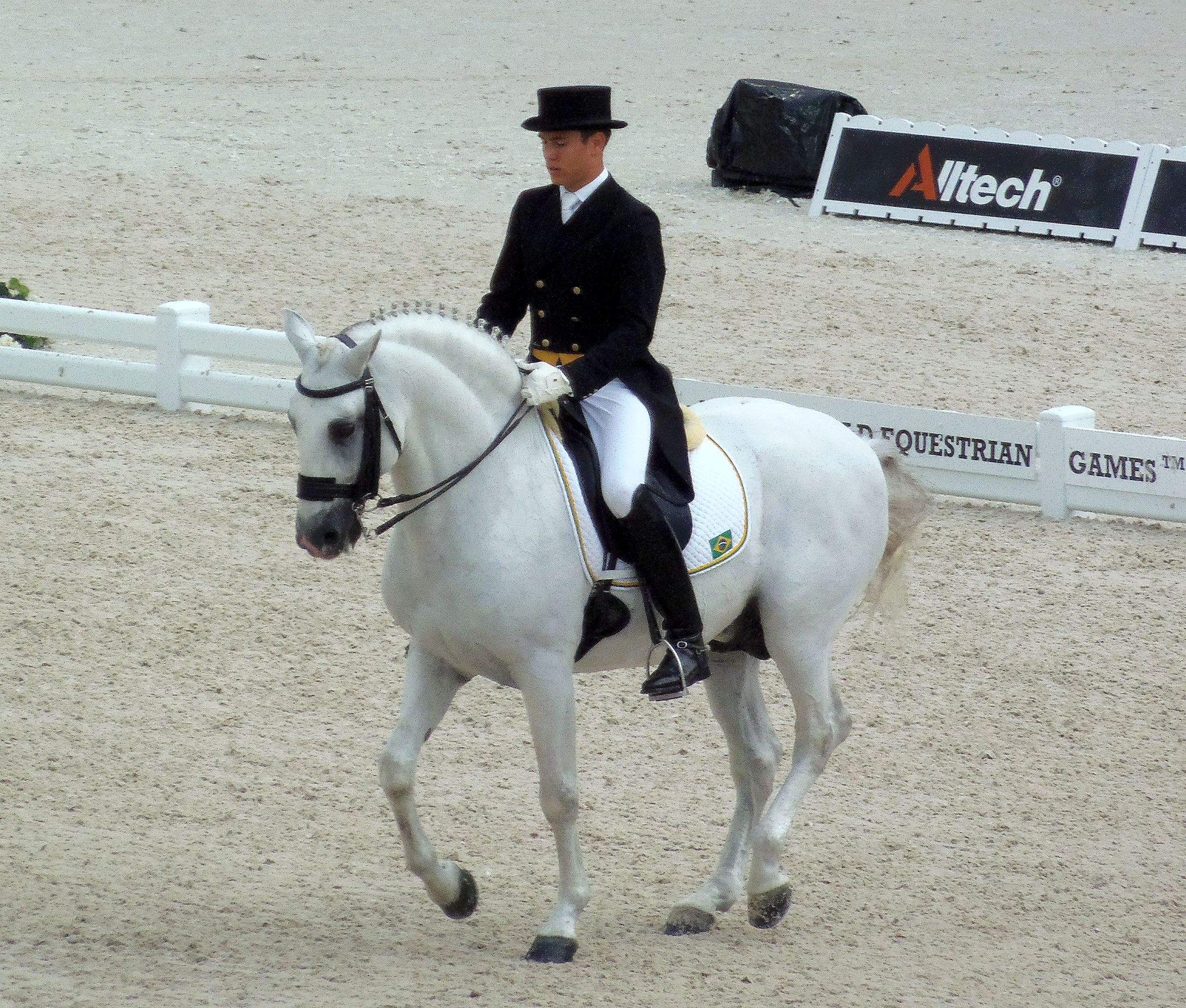
- João Oliva and Signo dos Pinhais (2014 World Equestrian Games)

Personal information
- Full name: João Victor Marcari Oliva
- Discipline: Dressage
- Born: 2 February 1996 (age 30); São Paulo, Brazil
- Height: 182 cm (6 ft 0 in)
Medal record
Equestrian
Representing Brazil
Pan American Games
Silver medal – second place	2023 Santiago	Individual dressage
Silver medal – second place	2023 Santiago	Team dressage
Bronze medal – third place	2015 Toronto	Team dressage
Bronze medal – third place	2019 Lima	Team dressage
South American Games
Gold medal – first place	2014 Santiago	Individual dressage
Gold medal – first place	2014 Santiago	Team dressage

João Victor Marcari Oliva (born 2 February 1996) is a Brazilian Olympic dressage rider. He participated at the 2016 Summer Olympics in Rio de Janeiro, Brazil, where he finished 10th in the team competition and 46th in the individual competition.

Oliva also represented Brazil at the 2014 World Equestrian Games in Normandy, France, where he finished 24th in team dressage and 85th in the individual dressage competition. In 2015, he participated at the Pan American Games, where he won a bronze medal in team dressage.

He competed at the 2020 Summer Olympics and the 2024 Olympic Games.

He is a son of Hortência Marcari, Olympic silver medalist in basketball from 1996.
