= Founders League =

US college preparatory athletic league

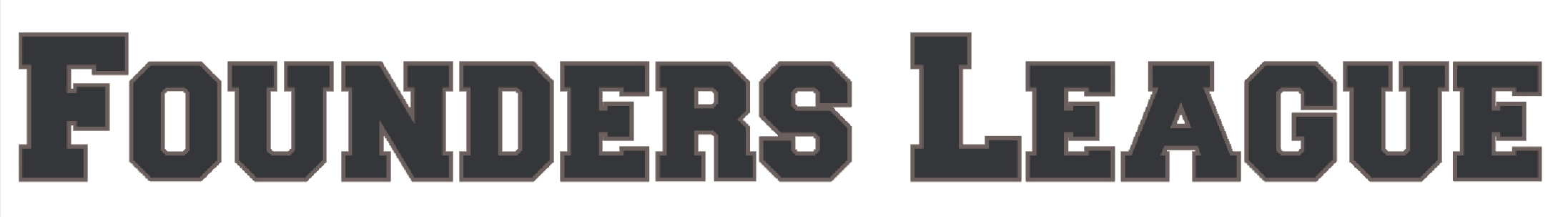
- Conference: NEPSAC
- Sports fielded: 18
- Division: New England Prep School Class A Division 1
- No. of teams: 11
- Region: New England
- Website: thefoundersleague.org

The Founders League is an American athletic league comprising a number of college preparatory schools. Founded in 1984, it consists of ten schools in Connecticut and one from eastern New York. All of the schools in the Conference are founding members. The League is one of eleven in the New England Preparatory School Athletic Council.

== Members ==
| School | Mascot | Location | Founded | Grades | Enrollment | Colors | Varsity Teams | Rivals |
|---|---|---|---|---|---|---|---|---|
| Avon Old Farms School | Winged Beavers | Avon, CT | 1927 | 9-12(PG) | 408 Boys | | 15 | Westminster |
| Choate Rosemary Hall | Wild Boars | Wallingford, CT | 1890 | 9-12(PG) | 865 | | 32 | Deerfield |
| The Ethel Walker School | Wild Cats | Simsbury, CT | 1911 | 6-12 | 258 Girls | | 13 | Miss Porters |
| The Hotchkiss School | Bearcats | Lakeville, CT | 1891 | 9-12(PG) | 599 | | 17 | Taft |
| Kent School | Lions | Kent, CT | 1906 | 9-12(PG) | 570 | | 23 | Loomis Chaffee |
| Kingswood Oxford School | Wyverns | West Hartford, CT | 1909 | 6-12 | 499 | | 26 | None |
| Loomis Chaffee School | Pelicans | Windsor, CT | 1874 | 9-12(PG) | 716 | | 29 | Kent |
| Miss Porter's School | Daisies | Farmington, CT | 1843 | 9-12(PG) | 333 Girls | | 18 | Ethel Walker |
| The Taft School | Rhinos | Watertown, CT | 1890 | 9-12(PG) | 595 | | 27 | Hotchkiss |
| Trinity-Pawling School | Pride (of Lions) | Pawling, NY | 1907 | 7-12(PG) | 325 Boys | | 13 | Avon Old Farms |
| Westminster School | Martlets | Simsbury, CT | 1888 | 9-12(PG) | 390 | | 16 | Avon Old Farms |

== Competition ==
Founders League competition takes place in the following sports: baseball, basketball, cross country, field hockey, football, golf, ice hockey, lacrosse, soccer, softball, squash, swimming, tennis, track and field, volleyball, water polo, and wrestling. By and large, member schools compete for the Founders League Championship in each of the aforementioned sports for which a team is fielded. In some cases, Founders League teams collectively participate in regional leagues or tournaments, including the New Englands. The Founders League is recognized by the New England Preparatory School Athletic Council.
