= Judith Peabody =

American socialite and philanthropist (1930–2010)

Judith Anne Peabody (née Walker, formerly Dunnington; May 6, 1930 – July 25, 2010) was an American socialite and philanthropist who was best known for her involvement as a volunteer with causes ranging from the legal defense of Lenny Bruce to assisting families with AIDS.

== Biography ==
Judith Anne Walker was born on May 6, 1930, in Richmond, Virginia. After her parents were divorced, her mother, Elizabeth Taylor Walker, married attorney Walter Grey Dunnington at a January 1937 ceremony conducted in the bride's apartment at the Carlyle Hotel, where the couple would continue to live. She attended Miss Hewitt's Classes in Manhattan and the Ethel Walker School in Simsbury, Connecticut. She was introduced to society in September 1947 at the Piping Rock Club in Locust Valley, New York. She was a member of the Colony Club and the New York Junior League. She met her future husband at a dinner party and they were engaged a week later. After her future husband picked her up for a date at a youth center for juvenile delinquents where she had been working, she pleaded with him not to tell her mother where she had been, saying "she thinks I'm having French lessons".

After two years at Bryn Mawr College, she married Samuel Parkman Peabody at St. Bartholomew's Episcopal Church in Manhattan in a ceremony officiated by the groom's father, Malcolm Endicott Peabody, a Bishop of the Episcopal Diocese of Central New York.

A notable socialite in Manhattan who was frequently mentioned in the press, she was known for wearing clothing designed for her by Bill Blass and Donald Brooks, with the latter once saying that "she epitomizes the simplicity of our type of customer". Peabody was active in causes ranging from serving on the board of the New York Shakespeare Festival and the Dance Theatre of Harlem, and was a patron of the American Ballet Theatre. After reading an article about the legal troubles faced by comedian Lenny Bruce in the 1960s, she sent him a contribution towards the costs of his legal defense and assisted him with research.

She earned a certificate in psychology from the Postgraduate Center for Mental Health and established Reality House together with her husband, as an organization in Harlem dedicated to assisting heroin addicts who were trying to overcome their addiction. Three mornings each week she led groups of heroin users who were trying to deal with the personal issues that led to their addiction. The organization operated from a network of storefronts and established programs at two maximum security prisons, reaching out to over 250 participants. As of 1971, 50 former addicts who had undergone the intensive 18-month program of counseling and work therapy had completed the program and none of them returned to using drugs.

She also worked with the Renegades Housing Movement, which had started as a youth gang and was attempting to focus its efforts on social activism in East Harlem, where they worked on renovating a deteriorating building. After a friend died of AIDS, Peabody became involved at the Gay Men's Health Crisis, where she helped raise funds for the organization and conducted support groups. Marjorie J. Hill, chief executive of GMHC, described Peabody as "someone who recognized the challenge of AIDS long before it was fashionable" who "did everything she could, on a personal level and an institutional level, to combat the stigma of the disease". In 1987, Richard Dunne, executive director of the Gay Men's Health Crisis, compared her influence to that of Betty Ford on alcoholism, saying that "when Judy Peabody talks about AIDS, it gets people attention". As part of her volunteering at GMHC, she served as the care partner for ten people with AIDS, and would drop everything to attend to them in cases of need, saying her "number one concern is always my friends who have AIDS", whom she would often visit in the hospital. She was an active fundraiser for GMHC, as well as with the People With AIDS Coalition, care programs at Saint Vincent's Catholic Medical Center and the development of an AIDS research laboratory at New York Hospital-Cornell Medical Center.

Peabody died at age 80 on July 25, 2010, at her apartment on Fifth Avenue, due to complications of a series of strokes that she had suffered in previous years. She was survived by her husband and a daughter.
