= Camille Carier Bergeron =

Canadian equestrian

Personal information
- Born: March 21, 2000 (age 26) Laval, Quebec, Canada

Sport
- Sport: Equestrian dressage
Medal record
Equestrian dressage
Representing Canada
Pan American Games
| Bronze medal – third place | 2023 Santiago | Team dressage |

Camille Carier Bergeron (born March 21, 2000) is a Canadian equestrian competing in the dressage discipline.

== Career ==
At the 2023 Pan American Games, Carier Bergeron would win the bronze medal as part of the team event. Carier Bergeron would also finish seventh individually. In March 2024, Carier Bergeron recorded her first CDI Big Tour Victory.

In July 2024, Carier Bergeron qualified to compete for Canada at the 2024 Summer Olympics.
