= Heather Blitz =

American dressage rider

Personal information
- Nationality: American
- Discipline: Dressage
- Born: December 25, 1968 (age 56)
- Horse: Paragon
Medal record
Equestrian
Representing United States
Pan American Games
Gold medal – first place	2011 Guadalajara	Team dressage
Silver medal – second place	2011 Guadalajara	Individual dressage

Heather Blitz (born December 25, 1968) is an American dressage rider. Blitz won team gold and individual silver in the 2011 Pan American Games, and was an alternate for the U.S. Olympic team for the 2012 London Olympic Games. Blitz taught Annie Peavy, who competed in the 2016 Paralympic Games.

== Career ==
Blitz began competing in dressage in 1994. She rode in Grand Prix competitions in Florida on the Danish horse Rambo, then moved to Denmark for several years. While living in Denmark, she competed across Europe on another Danish Warmblood, Otto. She won team gold and individual silver in 2011 at the Pan American Games. Blitz has periodically taken lessons from six-time Olympic rider Robert Dover.

Blitz's competition horse at the Pan American Games was a Danish Warmblood gelding named Paragon, who stood18 hands (72 inches, 183 cm) and was estimated to weigh 1,600 pounds. Blitz herself bred Paragon, attended his foaling, and began training him herself when he was three years old. She initially got the idea to breed him after riding his dam on a farm in Louisiana and being impressed with her gaits and temperament. Blitz originally intended to sell Paragon when he reached maturity, but later decided to keep him and compete him herself. Paragon was never been trained or ridden in competition by anyone but Blitz. Paragon has since retired and died in 2020. In 2012, Blitz was part of the United States Equestrian Team, and was an alternate for the US team in the London Olympics.

Blitz trained paralympic dressage rider Annie Peavy, who competed in the 2016 Summer Paralympics with her Hanoverian, Reno's Lancelot Warrior.

Blitz lives in Wellington, Florida.
