= Equestrian events at the 2014 South American Games =

Equestrian at the 2014 South American Games

There were four equestrian events at the 2014 South American Games. This event served as a qualifier for the 2015 Pan American Games in Toronto, Canada.

== Medal summary ==
=== Medal table ===
Rank	Nation	Gold	Silver	Bronze	Total
1	Brazil (BRA)	2	2	2	6
2	Chile (CHI)	2	1	1	4
3	Argentina (ARG)	0	1	1	2
Totals (3 entries)		4	4	4	12

=== Medalists ===
Event	Gold	Silver	Bronze
Dressage individual	João Victor Marcari Oliva; Brazil	Joao Dos Santos; Brazil	Leandro da Silva; Brazil
Dressage team	Brazil	Argentina	Chile
Jumping individual	Carlos Picasso; Chile	Javier Goycoolea; Chile	Sergio Nevis Marins; Brazil
Jumping team	Chile	Brazil	Argentina
