= Melinda Wortz =

American art historian and critic

Melinda Wortz (April 30, 1940 – February 6, 2002) was an art historian, art critic, gallery director, and art collector based in Southern California.

== Early life and education ==
Melinda Jane Farris was born in 1940, in Ann Arbor, Michigan. Her father was a professor of surgery at the University of Michigan; the Farris family moved to Southern California in 1948, when Dr. Farris joined the faculty at the University of Southern California. She attended Ethel Walker School in Connecticut, majored in art history as an undergraduate at Stanford University and at Radcliffe College, and earned a master's degree in art history from the University of California at Los Angeles, before pursuing doctoral work at the Graduate Theological Union at Berkeley. Her PhD in Theology and the Arts was granted in 1990, for her dissertation titled "Radical Emptiness: The Spiritual Experience in Contemporary Art."

== Career ==
Wortz was a professor at UC Irvine, chair of the art department and director of the UCI Fine Arts Gallery. She was particularly involved in collecting and presenting works from the Light and Space movement, which emerged in Los Angeles in the 1970s.

Published works by Wortz include Ludwig Wedl 1974 (Cirrus Editions 1975); The Soft Screw (Gemini GEL 1976, with Claes Oldenburg); Los Angeles Abstract Painting (University of New Mexico Press 1979); Diversity and Presence: Women Faculty Artists of the University of California (University of California Irvine 1987); David Ireland: A Decade Undocumented 1978-1988 (Sesnon Gallery 1988, with Karen Tsujimoto); California Sculpture Show (Fisher Gallery 1989, with Jan Buttenfield); Ansel Adams: Fiat Lux (University of California 1990); and Variations III: Emerging Artists in Southern California (Fellows of Contemporary Art 2000).

== Personal life ==
Wortz married twice, and was mother to five daughters. She married Thomas G. Terbell Jr. in 1960; he was director of the Pasadena Art Museum from 1969 to 1971. Her second husband and widower was psychologist Edward Wortz, who worked with artist James Turrell, and joined Wortz in collecting contemporary art. Wortz's academic interest in theology extended into her personal life, where she was on the vestry at All Saints Episcopal Church in Pasadena. She died in 2002, after more than a decade with early-onset Alzheimer's disease. She was 61.

== Legacy ==
Wortz's papers are in the Archives of American Art. A gallery at the Museum of Contemporary Art San Diego is named in her memory.
