= Christian Simonson =

US equestrian

Personal information
- Born: Christian Simonson; 26 August 2002 (age 23) Ventura, California, United States

Sport
- Country: United States
- Sport: Equestrian
- Coached by: Adrienne Lyle
Medal record
Equestrian
Representing United States
Pan American Games
Gold medal – first place	2023 Santiago	Team dressage
Dressage World Cup
Silver medal – second place	2026 Fort Worth	Individual dressage

Christian Simonson (born 26 August 2002, in Ventura, California, United States) is an American equestrian. Simonson won a silver medal at the 2026 World Cup Finals in Fort Worth and was part of the American team that won gold at the 2023 Pan American Games in Santiago, while being individually the best combination in the Small Tour division at the Pan American Games.

Simonson was also successful as young rider, winning individual and team gold at the 2021 North American Championships in North Salem NY. Also, in 2017 he was part of the golden junior team at the North American Championships in Saugerties, New York.

He is being trained by Olympic medallist Adrienne Lyle.
