= Annie Peavy =

American Paralympic dressage rider

Angela "Annie" Marie Peavy (born August 12, 1996) is an American dressage rider. She participated in the 2016 Summer Paralympics in Rio de Janeiro riding Lancelot Warrior.

== Career ==
Peavy is partially paralyzed on her left side, due to a blood clot that affected her prior to birth. She began taking riding lessons at a young age, and as of 2016 is being trained by Heather Blitz. In 2014, she competed at the World Equestrian Games.
