= Antonio Rivera (equestrian) =

Mexican equestrian

Personal information
- Full name: Antonio Rivera Galarza
- Nationality: Mexican
- Born: 24 February 1967 (age 59)

Sport
- Sport: Equestrian
Medal record
Equestrian
Representing Mexico
Pan American Games
Gold medal – first place	1995 Mar del Plata	Team dressage
Bronze medal – third place	1999 Winnipeg	Team dressage
Bronze medal – third place	2003 Santo Domingo	Team dressage
Central American and Caribbean Games
Silver medal – second place	2023 Santo Domingo	Team dressage

Antonio Rivera Galarza (born 24 February 1967) is a Mexican equestrian. He competed in the individual dressage event at the 2000 Summer Olympics.
