= Marco Bernal =

Colombian equestrian (born 1962)

Personal information
- Full name: Marco Bernal
- Nationality: Colombia
- Discipline: Dressage
- Born: May 2, 1962 (age 63); Bogotá, Colombia
Medal record
Equestrian
Representing Colombia
Pan American Games
Bronze medal – third place	2011 Guadalajara	Team dressage
Silver medal – second place	1999 Winnipeg	Team dressage
Central American and Caribbean Games
Gold medal – first place	2010 Mayagüez	Team dressage
Gold medal – first place	2010 Mayagüez	Individual dressage
Gold medal – first place	2014 Veracruz	Individual dressage
Silver medal – second place	2014 Veracruz	Team dressage

Marco Bernal (born 2 May 1962) is a Colombian athlete in dressage. He competed at several Pan-American Games where he won team bronze in 2011 and team silver in 1999. In 2010 Bernal was gold medaled at the Central American Games in Mayagüez, Puerto Rico. The same year he represented Colombia at the 2010 FEI World Equestrian Games in Lexington, Kentucky.

Bernal was the first Latin American who graduated from the prestigious German riding school in Warendorf and was the first Colombian who competed at the World Cup Finals in Dressage, in Las Vegas 2009, where he received a wildcard from the FEI.
