= Svenja Grimm =

Chilean dressage rider

Personal information
- Full name: Svenja Grimm
- Nationality: Chile; Germany
- Born: June 23, 1990 (age 36) Bremen, Germany

Sport
- Country: Chile
- Sport: Dressage
- Coached by: Mario Vargas

Achievements and titles
- Regional finals: 2023 Pan American Games

Svenja Grimm (born 23 June 1990 in Bremen, Germany) is a German born Chilean dressage rider. She competed at the 2023 Pan American Games in Santiago. Grimm also competed at the 2022 World Championships for Young Dressage Horses.

She runs a dressage stable in Chile together with her partner and trainer Mario Vargas. During the summer the couple spends in The Netherlands to train and compete.
