= César Parra =

Dressage rider

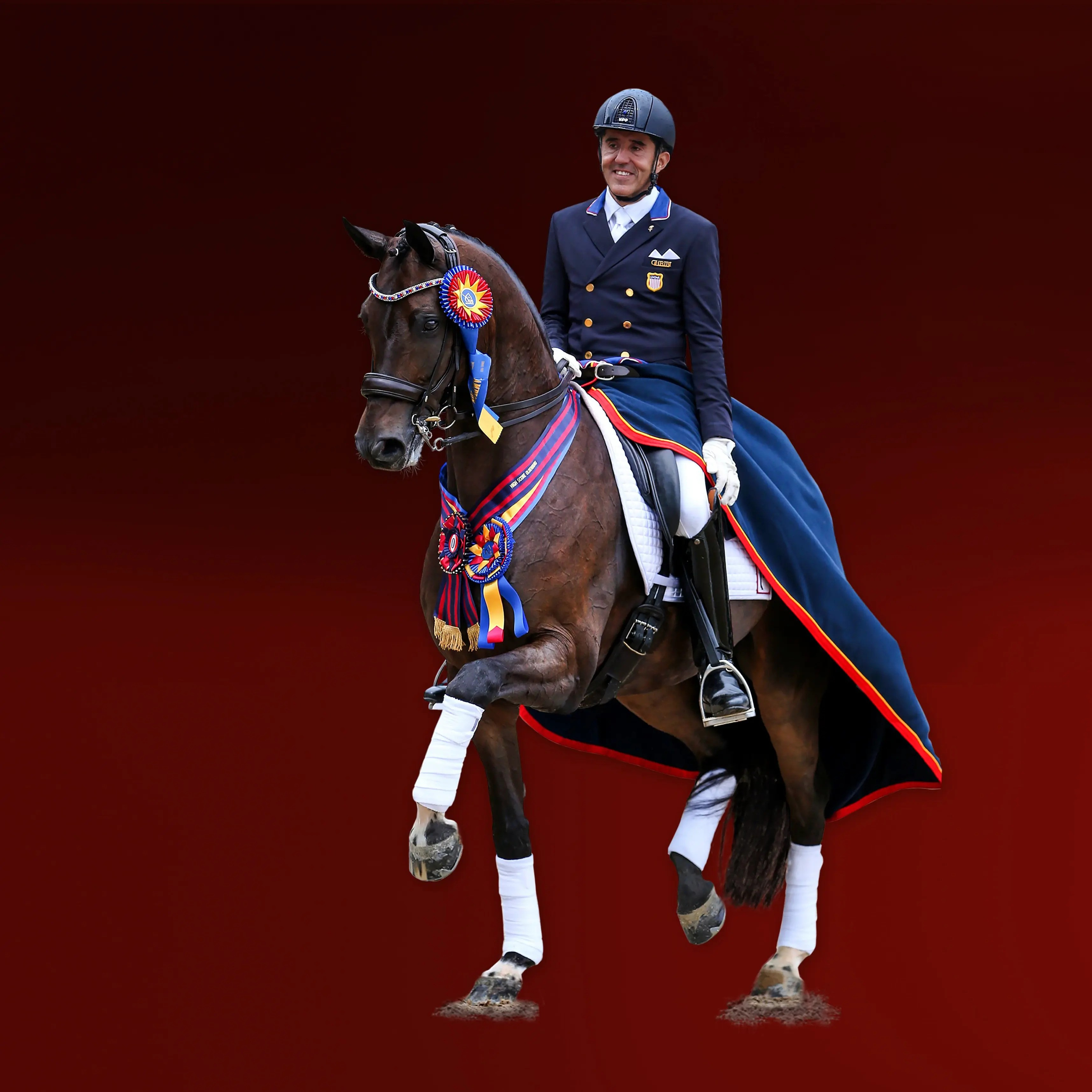

Personal information
- Nationality: Colombian
- Citizenship: United States
- Born: Colombia, Ibagué
- Education: Boston University
- Spouse: Marcela Ortiz-Parra
- Website: https://drcesarparradressagesport.com/

Sport
- Country: United States
- Sport: Equestrian dressage
Medal record
Equestrian
Representing Colombia
Pan American Games
Silver medal – second place	1999 Winnipeg	Team dressage
Representing the United States
Pan American Games
Gold medal – first place	2011 Guadalajara	Team dressage

Cesar Parra is a Colombian-American champion dressage rider and coach, winning a Team Gold Medal at the 2011 Pan American Games.

== Equestrian career ==
Parra began training in Germany in after meeting Linda Zang in 1995, who recognized his talent. Since turning his attention to dressage full time, he has competed and medaled in international competitions including the Pan American Games, Central American Games, World Cup finals, World Equestrian Games and the Olympics. Parra has medaled at the Bolivarian Games, the Central American Games, and the 1999 Pan American Games for his native country, Colombia. Riding for Colombia, he participated in the 2004 Olympic Games, in Athens and the 2005 FEI World Cup Finals, in Las Vegas. He competed twice at the World Equestrian games, in Jerez 2002 and Aachen 2006.

Parra was part of the Team Gold Medal at the 2011 Pan American Games in Guadalajara, Mexico. He was USA Intermediare I National Champion in 2010 and the USA Developing Grand Prix National Champion in 2017. Parra represented the US in 2014 at the World Cup Finals, in Lyon, and the Longines FEI World Breeding Championships, in the 7 year old division.

=== Horse abuse accusations ===
In February 2024, graphic videos (which were shared from his own Instagram account) were leaked online showing Parra abusing horses with whips, ropes and other devices. These videos sparked a worldwide outrage in the equestrian community and beyond. On February 2, Parra was "provisionally suspended" by the FEI for accusations of horse abuse. The United States Equestrian Federation banned Parra from national competition after the videos came to light.

Later, the German Equestrian Federation and certain German horse breeding associations took disciplinary action against individuals in Europe that were seen in the videos to be linked to Parra's ill treatment of horses. The Oldenburg and Hanoverian Verband banned Parra for life.

=== Dressage at Devon disqualification ===
In 2021, Cesar Parra and horse Belle Ami were announced as the winners of the 3-star Intermediate I and I-1 Freestyle at the Dressage at Devon horse show. They were later disqualified when it became evident that Belle Ami tested positive for a prohibited substance benzocaine, but at the time, the positive drug test and disqualification was not made public. It took two years for the disqualification to be acknowledged. After Parra's disqualification, the winning horse and rider pair only received their redistributed prize money and ribbons in 2023. In April 2024, Parra was party to a federal lawsuit for alleged fraud over the ownership of Belle Ami. The suit specifically highlighted the disqualification and its impact on the horses value.

== Personal life ==
Parra is originally from Colombia and a dentist by profession. Parra moved to the United States permanently in 1999, and gained his US citizenship in 2008.

In 2012, he appeared in court to answer to two criminal complaints alleging torture and "torment of a living animal", after a horse being trained by Parra fell while being lunged, causing lasting injury. Parra was adamant in his innocence, saying: "I welcome the investigators to come my farm at any time, unannounced and see our day to day practices. I am very proud of our training and the care and consideration my team gives to each and every horse. I was deeply pained by these claims forth against me regarding the "alleged torture and abuse" of a horse. I wanted a full investigation to clear my name and set the record straight". The charges were later dismissed due to a lack of evidence.

Former employees and students alleging sexual abuse by Parra. The USEF and the FEI are investigating the matter, with USEF saying it "will pursue disciplinary action to the highest degree".

A lawsuit brought by the owners of the Westphalian mare Belle Ami claims Parra cheated her on the buying price of the horse after Parra refused to provide Belle Ami's ownership papers. Allegedly the owners received neither the receipts or the ownership papers, despite repeated demands. It is claimed that the horse became effectively worthless, as she was unable to sell it without certificate of ownership.
