= Luiza Almeida =

Brazilian equestrian (born 1991)

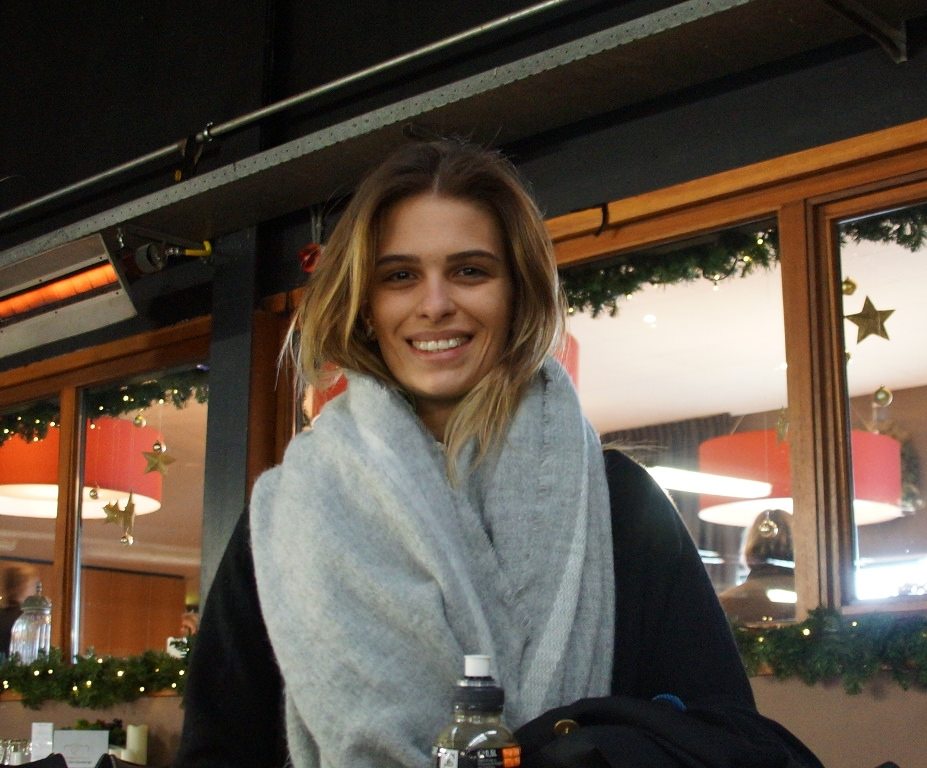
- Luiza Almeida (2015)

Personal information
- Full name: Luíza Novaes Tavares De Almeida
- Born: 7 September 1991 (age 34) São Paulo, Brazil

Sport
- Country: Brazil
- Sport: Equestrian
- Club: Coudelaria Rocas do Vouga
- Turned pro: 2007

Achievements and titles
- Olympic finals: Beijing 2008, London 2012, Rio de Janeiro 2016
- World finals: Lexington 2010, Caen 2014

Luiza Novaes Tavares de Almeida (born 7 September 1991) is a Brazilian dressage rider. She represented Brazil at the 2008 Summer Olympics as youngest equestrian ever with an age of 16 and at the 2012 Summer Olympics in the individual dressage, finishing 47th. In 2016 she competed for the third time at the 2016 Summer Olympics in Rio de Janeiro.
