= Leandro Silva (equestrian) =

Brazilian equestrian (born 1976)

Personal information
- Born: 8 April 1976 (age 50) Cáceres, Brazil

Sport
- Sport: Equestrian
Medal record
Equestrian
Representing Brazil
Pan American Games
Bronze medal – third place	2015 Toronto	Team dressage
Bronze medal – third place	2019 Lima	Team dressage
South American Games
Gold medal – first place	2014 Santiago	Team dressage
Bronze medal – third place	2014 Santiago	Individual dressage

Leandro Aparecido da Silva (born 8 April 1976) is a Brazilian equestrian. He competed in the individual dressage event at the 2008 Summer Olympics. In 2020, his license was suspended by Sociedad Hipica Paulista, and he was put under investigation by the International Federation for Equestrian Sports, after a videos of Silva and his son mistreating ponies surfaced on the internet.

The FEI banned da Silva for three years after the incident came to light, calling the abuse "reprehensible".
