= María Inés García =

Colombian dressage rider (born 1964)

Personal information
- Born: February 28, 1964 (age 62)
Medal record
Equestrian
Representing Colombia
Pan American Games
Bronze medal – third place	2011 Guadalajara	Team dressage
Central American and Caribbean Games
Gold medal – first place	2006 Cartagena	Team dressage

María Inés García (born 28 February 1964) is a Colombian dressage rider. She competed at the 2014 World Equestrian Games in Normandy, France where she finished 96th in the field of 100 competitors in the individual dressage competition.

She won a bronze medal in team dressage at the 2011 Pan American Games and a gold medal in team dressage at the 2006 Central American and Caribbean Games.
