= Sarah Tubman =

American equestrian

Personal information
- Nationality: American
- Born: Sarah Lockman; August 11, 1988 (age 38)

Sport
- Country: United States
- Sport: Equestrianism
Medal record
Equestrian
Representing United States
Pan American Games
Gold medal – first place	2019 Lima	Individual dressage
Gold medal – first place	2023 Santiago	Team dressage
Silver medal – second place	2019 Lima	Team dressage

Sarah Tubman (born August 11, 1988), also known as Sarah Lockman, is an American equestrian.

She represented the United States at the 2019 Pan American Games in Lima, Peru where she won team silver and individual gold with her Dutch-bred gelding First Apple.

She represented the United States at the 2023 Pan American Games, winning a gold medal in Team dressage.

In 2021 Sarah married Canadian rider, trainer and judge Lee Tubman. Together they run a dressage stable in Wellington, Florida.
