= List of Pan American medalists for Brazil (2000–present) =

This is a full list of all Brazilian medalists at the Pan American Games from the year 2000.

== List of medalists ==
Medal	Name(s)	Games	Sport	Event	Date	Ref
Bronze	André Domingos	(Dominican Republic) 2003 Santo Domingo	Athletics	Men's 200 m	8 Aug 2003	
Silver	Oscar Barbosa dos Santos	(Dominican Republic) 2003 Santo Domingo	Athletics	Men's 800 m	6 Aug 2003	
Bronze	Fabiano Peçanha	(Dominican Republic) 2003 Santo Domingo	Athletics	Men's 800 m	6 Aug 2003	
Gold	Hudson de Souza	(Dominican Republic) 2003 Santo Domingo	Athletics	Men's 1500 m	9 Aug 2003	
Gold	Hudson de Souza	(Dominican Republic) 2003 Santo Domingo	Athletics	Men's 5000 m	5 Aug 2003	
Bronze	Marílson Gomes dos Santos	(Dominican Republic) 2003 Santo Domingo	Athletics	Men's 5000 m	5 Aug 2003	
Silver	Marílson Gomes dos Santos	(Dominican Republic) 2003 Santo Domingo	Athletics	Men's 10,000 m	7 Aug 2003	
Bronze	Márcio Simão	(Dominican Republic) 2003 Santo Domingo	Athletics	Men's 110 m hurdles	9 Aug 2003	
Gold	Vanderlei Cordeiro de Lima	(Dominican Republic) 2003 Santo Domingo	Athletics	Men's marathon	9 Aug 2003	
Silver	Mário dos Santos	(Dominican Republic) 2003 Santo Domingo	Athletics	Men's 50 km walk	8 Aug 2003	
Gold	André Domingos; Claudinei Quirino; Édson Luciano; Vicente Lenílson; Cláudio Roberto Souza (heats); Jarbas Mascarenhas (heats)	(Dominican Republic) 2003 Santo Domingo	Athletics	Men's 4 × 100 m relay	9 Aug 2003	
Silver	Jadel Gregório	(Dominican Republic) 2003 Santo Domingo	Athletics	Men's triple jump	8 Aug 2003	
Bronze	Christiane Ritz	(Dominican Republic) 2003 Santo Domingo	Athletics	Women's 800 m	6 Aug 2003	
Gold	Márcia Narloch	(Dominican Republic) 2003 Santo Domingo	Athletics	Women's marathon	9 Aug 2003	
Bronze	Geisa Coutinho; Josiane Tito; Lucimar Teodoro; Maria Almirão	(Dominican Republic) 2003 Santo Domingo	Athletics	Women's 4 × 400 m relay	9 Aug 2003	
Silver	Elisângela Adriano	(Dominican Republic) 2003 Santo Domingo	Athletics	Women's shot put	7 Aug 2003	
Gold	Men's basketball team: Alex Garcia Anderson Varejão André Bambu Arnaldinho Filho Dedé Barbosa Demétrius Conrado Ferraciú Guilherme Giovannoni Marcelinho Machado Renato Lamas Tiago Splitter Tiago Valentim Valtinho da Silva	(Dominican Republic) 2003 Santo Domingo	Basketball	Men's tournament	7 Aug 2003	
Bronze	Women's basketball team: Adriana Moisés Alessandra Santos de Oliveira Cíntia Santos Jacqueline Godoy Jucimara Dantas Kelly Santos Lilian Gonçalves Micaela Jacintho Renata Oliveira Silvinha Luz Soeli Zakrzeski Vivian Lopes	(Dominican Republic) 2003 Santo Domingo	Basketball	Women's tournament	8 Aug 2003	
Bronze	James Dean Pereira	(Dominican Republic) 2003 Santo Domingo	Boxing	Men's flyweight (-51 kg)		
Bronze	Marcos Costa	(Dominican Republic) 2003 Santo Domingo	Boxing	Men's light welterweight (-64 kg)		
Silver	Sebastián Cuattrin	(Dominican Republic) 2003 Santo Domingo	Canoeing	Men's K-1 500 m		
Gold	Carlos Campos; Fábio DeMari	(Dominican Republic) 2003 Santo Domingo	Canoeing	Men's K-2 500 m		
Silver	Sebastián Cuattrin	(Dominican Republic) 2003 Santo Domingo	Canoeing	Men's K-1 1000 m		
Bronze	Fábio DeMari; Roger Caumo	(Dominican Republic) 2003 Santo Domingo	Canoeing	Men's K-2 1000 m		
Silver	André Caye; Carlos Campos; Sebastián Cuattrin; Sebastian Szubski	(Dominican Republic) 2003 Santo Domingo	Canoeing	Men's K-4 1000 m		
Silver	Edvandro Cruz	(Dominican Republic) 2003 Santo Domingo	Cycling	Men's mountain bike	10 Aug 2003	
Silver	Janildes Fernandes	(Dominican Republic) 2003 Santo Domingo	Cycling	Women's race individual (road)	16 Aug 2003	
Silver	Cassius Duran	(Dominican Republic) 2003 Santo Domingo	Diving	Men's 10 m platform	9 Aug 2003	
Bronze	Juliana Veloso	(Dominican Republic) 2003 Santo Domingo	Diving	Women's 3 m springboard	8 Aug 2003	
Silver	Juliana Veloso	(Dominican Republic) 2003 Santo Domingo	Diving	Women's 10 m platform	8 Aug 2003	
Bronze	Álvaro de Miranda Neto; Bernardo Alves; César Almeida; Karina Johannpeter	(Dominican Republic) 2003 Santo Domingo	Equestrian	Jumping team		
Silver	Men's football team: Adaílton Cleiton Xavier Coelho Dagoberto Diego Souza Dudu Cearense Fernando Henrique Gabriel Santos Irineu Jardel Jefferson Leandro Marcelo Nicácio Moreno Simão Vágner Love Wendel William	(Dominican Republic) 2003 Santo Domingo	Football	Men's tournament	15 Aug 2003	
Gold	Women's football team: Andréia Suntaque Cristiane Elaine Estrela Formiga Giselle Vasconcellos Juliana Cabral Karina Balestra Kelly Cristina Marta Maycon Michelle Reis Mônica de Paula Rafaela de Moraes Renata Costa Renata Diniz Rosana dos Santos Tânia Maranhão Tatiana Torres	(Dominican Republic) 2003 Santo Domingo	Football	Women's tournament	15 Aug 2003	
Silver	Michel Conceição	(Dominican Republic) 2003 Santo Domingo	Gymnastics	Artistic gymnastics men's floor exercise		
Bronze	Mosiah Rodrigues	(Dominican Republic) 2003 Santo Domingo	Gymnastics	Artistic gymnastics men's horizontal bar		
Bronze	Mosiah Rodrigues	(Dominican Republic) 2003 Santo Domingo	Gymnastics	Artistic gymnastics men's pommel horse		
Silver	Diego Hypólito	(Dominican Republic) 2003 Santo Domingo	Gymnastics	Artistic gymnastics men's vault		
Bronze	Michel Conceição	(Dominican Republic) 2003 Santo Domingo	Gymnastics	Artistic gymnastics men's vault		
Silver	Danilo Nogueira; Diego Hypólito; Michel Conceição; Mosiah Rodrigues; Victor Rosa; Vitor Camargo	(Dominican Republic) 2003 Santo Domingo	Gymnastics	Artistic gymnastics men's all-around team		
Bronze	Daniele Hypólito	(Dominican Republic) 2003 Santo Domingo	Gymnastics	Artistic gymnastics women's all-around		
Silver	Daniele Hypólito	(Dominican Republic) 2003 Santo Domingo	Gymnastics	Artistic gymnastics women's balance beam		
Silver	Daniele Hypólito	(Dominican Republic) 2003 Santo Domingo	Gymnastics	Artistic gymnastics women's uneven bars		
Bronze	Ana Paula Rodrigues; Camila Comin; Caroline Molinari; Daiane dos Santos; Daniele Hypólito; Laís Souza	(Dominican Republic) 2003 Santo Domingo	Gymnastics	Artistic gymnastics women's all-around team		
Bronze	Tayanne Mantovaneli	(Dominican Republic) 2003 Santo Domingo	Gymnastics	Rhythmic gymnastics individual clubs		
Gold	Ana Mari Maciel; Dayane Camilo; Fernanda Cavalieri; Gabriela Andrioli; Thalita Nakadomari	(Dominican Republic) 2003 Santo Domingo	Gymnastics	Rhythmic gymnastics group all-around		
Gold	Ana Mari Maciel; Dayane Camilo; Fernanda Cavalieri; Gabriela Andrioli; Thalita Nakadomari	(Dominican Republic) 2003 Santo Domingo	Gymnastics	Rhythmic gymnastics group hoops-balls		
Gold	Ana Mari Maciel; Dayane Camilo; Gabriela Andrioli; Natalia Eidt; Thalita Nakadomari	(Dominican Republic) 2003 Santo Domingo	Gymnastics	Rhythmic gymnastics group ribbons		
Gold	Men's handball team: Alexandre Folhas Alexandre Vasconcelos Bruno Souza Daniel Baldacin Eduardo Reis Fabio Vanini Gustavo Henrique Silva Hélio Justino Jair Alves Jr. Jaqson Kojoroski Jardel Pizzinato José Ronaldo do Nascimento Marcos Paulo dos Santos Renato Tupan Ruy Winglitton Rocha	(Dominican Republic) 2003 Santo Domingo	Handball	Men's tournament	11 Aug 2003	
Gold	Women's handball team: Alexandra do Nascimento Aline Silva Aline Waleska Rosas Célia Coppi Cristina Márcia da Silva Daniela Piedade Darly de Paula Fabiana Diniz Idalina Mesquita Juceli Sales Margareth Montão Sandra de Oliveira Silvia Pinheiro Tayra Rodrigues Viviane Jacques	(Dominican Republic) 2003 Santo Domingo	Handball	Women's tournament	12 Aug 2003	
Bronze	Henrique Guimarães	(Dominican Republic) 2003 Santo Domingo	Judo	Men's half lightweight (-66 kg)		
Gold	Luiz Camilo Jr.	(Dominican Republic) 2003 Santo Domingo	Judo	Men's lightweight (-73 kg)		
Gold	Flávio Canto	(Dominican Republic) 2003 Santo Domingo	Judo	Men's half middleweight (-81 kg)		
Bronze	Carlos Honorato	(Dominican Republic) 2003 Santo Domingo	Judo	Men's middleweight (-90 kg)		
Gold	Mário Sabino	(Dominican Republic) 2003 Santo Domingo	Judo	Men's half heavyweight (-100 kg)		
Gold	Daniel Hernandes	(Dominican Republic) 2003 Santo Domingo	Judo	Men's heavyweight (+100 kg)		
Bronze	Fabiane Hukuda	(Dominican Republic) 2003 Santo Domingo	Judo	Women's half lightweight (-52 kg)		
Bronze	Tânia Ferreira	(Dominican Republic) 2003 Santo Domingo	Judo	Women's lightweight (-57 kg)		
Silver	Vânia Ishii	(Dominican Republic) 2003 Santo Domingo	Judo	Women's half middleweight (-63 kg)		
Gold	Edinanci Silva	(Dominican Republic) 2003 Santo Domingo	Judo	Women's half heavyweight (-78 kg)		
Bronze	Jurandir Andrade	(Dominican Republic) 2003 Santo Domingo	Karate	Men's kata		
Bronze	Sidirley de Souza	(Dominican Republic) 2003 Santo Domingo	Karate	Men's kumite (-62 kg)		
Bronze	Emmanuel Santana	(Dominican Republic) 2003 Santo Domingo	Karate	Men's kumite (-74 kg)		
Silver	Nelson Sardenberg	(Dominican Republic) 2003 Santo Domingo	Karate	Men's kumite (-80 kg)		
Bronze	Cíntia Lassalvia	(Dominican Republic) 2003 Santo Domingo	Karate	Women's kata		
Gold	Lucélia Ribeiro	(Dominican Republic) 2003 Santo Domingo	Karate	Women's kumite (+58 kg)		
Silver	Samantha Harvey	(Dominican Republic) 2003 Santo Domingo	Modern pentathlon	Women's individual		
Bronze	Men's roller hockey team: Daniel Bellangero Danilo Frugis Eduardo Kwok Emanuel de Queiroz Eric Hayashida Fabio Asse Luiz Gustavo Vinagre Pablo Gomes Navarro Renato Lopes Nogueira Rogério Watanabe	(Dominican Republic) 2003 Santo Domingo	Roller sports	Roller hockey		
Gold	Marcel Stürmer	(Dominican Republic) 2003 Santo Domingo	Roller sports	Artistic free skating men's		
Bronze	Mayra Ramos	(Dominican Republic) 2003 Santo Domingo	Roller sports	Artistic free skating women's		
Silver	Anderson Nocetti; Marcelus dos Santos	(Dominican Republic) 2003 Santo Domingo	Rowing	Men's double sculls		
Silver	José Sobral Jr. Thiago Gomes	(Dominican Republic) 2003 Santo Domingo	Rowing	Men's lightweight double sculls		
Bronze	Allan Bitencourt; Anderson Nocetti; Leandro Tozzo; Marcelus dos Santos	(Dominican Republic) 2003 Santo Domingo	Rowing	Men's quadruple sculls		
Silver	Gustavo Santos; João Borges; Ronaldo Vargas; Rui Valle	(Dominican Republic) 2003 Santo Domingo	Rowing	Men's lightweight quadruple sculls		
Silver	Alexander Altair Soares; Gibran Cunha	(Dominican Republic) 2003 Santo Domingo	Rowing	Men's coxless pair-oared shells		
Bronze	Alexander Altair Soares; Claudiomar Iung; Gibran Cunha; Oswaldo Kuster Neto	(Dominican Republic) 2003 Santo Domingo	Rowing	Men's coxless four-oared shells		
Gold	Robert Scheidt	(Dominican Republic) 2003 Santo Domingo	Sailing	Men's Laser class		
Gold	Ricardo Winicki	(Dominican Republic) 2003 Santo Domingo	Sailing	Men's sailboard		
Gold	Bruno Amorim; Dante Bianchi	(Dominican Republic) 2003 Santo Domingo	Sailing	Snipe class		
Silver	Alan Adler; Daniel Santiago; João Carlos Jordão; Maurício Santa Cruz	(Dominican Republic) 2003 Santo Domingo	Sailing	J/24 class		
Bronze	Fabio Coelho	(Dominican Republic) 2003 Santo Domingo	Shooting	Men's 10 m air rifle	4 Aug 2003	
Silver	Rodrigo Bastos	(Dominican Republic) 2003 Santo Domingo	Shooting	Men's trap	3 Aug 2003	
Bronze	Janice Teixeira	(Dominican Republic) 2003 Santo Domingo	Shooting	Women's trap	4 Aug 2003	
Bronze	Ronivaldo Conceição	(Dominican Republic) 2003 Santo Domingo	Squash	Men's singles		
Silver	Luciano Barbosa; Rafael Alarçón; Ronivaldo Conceição	(Dominican Republic) 2003 Santo Domingo	Squash	Men's team		
Bronze	Flávia Roberts; Karen Redfern; Patricia Pamplona	(Dominican Republic) 2003 Santo Domingo	Squash	Women's team		
Gold	Fernando Scherer	(Dominican Republic) 2003 Santo Domingo	Swimming	Men's 50 m freestyle	16 Aug 2003	
Bronze	Eduardo Fischer	(Dominican Republic) 2003 Santo Domingo	Swimming	Men's 100 m breaststroke	12 Aug 2003	
Bronze	Kaio de Almeida	(Dominican Republic) 2003 Santo Domingo	Swimming	Men's 100 m butterfly	13 Aug 2003	
Bronze	Gustavo Borges	(Dominican Republic) 2003 Santo Domingo	Swimming	Men's 100 m freestyle	14 Aug 2003	
Gold	Rogério Romero	(Dominican Republic) 2003 Santo Domingo	Swimming	Men's 200 m backstroke	14 Aug 2003	
Bronze	Marcelo Tomazini	(Dominican Republic) 2003 Santo Domingo	Swimming	Men's 200 m breaststroke	15 Aug 2003	
Silver	Kaio de Almeida	(Dominican Republic) 2003 Santo Domingo	Swimming	Men's 200 m butterfly	16 Aug 2003	
Bronze	Pedro Monteiro	(Dominican Republic) 2003 Santo Domingo	Swimming	Men's 200 m butterfly	16 Aug 2003	
Bronze	Rodrigo Castro	(Dominican Republic) 2003 Santo Domingo	Swimming	Men's 200 m freestyle	11 Aug 2003	
Silver	Thiago Pereira	(Dominican Republic) 2003 Santo Domingo	Swimming	Men's 200 m medley	17 Aug 2003	
Bronze	Bruno Bonfim	(Dominican Republic) 2003 Santo Domingo	Swimming	Men's 400 m freestyle	15 Aug 2003	
Bronze	Thiago Pereira	(Dominican Republic) 2003 Santo Domingo	Swimming	Men's 400 m medley	13 Aug 2003	
Gold	Carlos Jayme; Fernando Scherer; Gustavo Borges; Jader Souza	(Dominican Republic) 2003 Santo Domingo	Swimming	Men's 4 × 100 m freestyle relay	15 Aug 2003	
Silver	Eduardo Fischer; Gustavo Borges; Kaio de Almeida; Paulo Machado	(Dominican Republic) 2003 Santo Domingo	Swimming	Men's 4 × 100 m medley relay	17 Aug 2003	
Silver	Carlos Jayme; Gustavo Borges; Rafael Mosca; Rodrigo Castro	(Dominican Republic) 2003 Santo Domingo	Swimming	Men's 4 × 200 m freestyle relay	13 Aug 2003	
Silver	Flávia Delaroli	(Dominican Republic) 2003 Santo Domingo	Swimming	Women's 50 m freestyle	17 Aug 2003	
Bronze	Mariana Brochado	(Dominican Republic) 2003 Santo Domingo	Swimming	Women's 200 m freestyle	13 Aug 2003	
Bronze	Monique Ferreira	(Dominican Republic) 2003 Santo Domingo	Swimming	Women's 400 m freestyle	14 Aug 2003	
Bronze	Joanna Maranhão	(Dominican Republic) 2003 Santo Domingo	Swimming	Women's 400 m medley	12 Aug 2003	
Bronze	Flávia Delaroli; Monique Ferreira; Rebeca Gusmão; Tatiana Lemos	(Dominican Republic) 2003 Santo Domingo	Swimming	Women's 4 × 100 m freestyle relay	14 Aug 2003	
Silver	Ana Muniz; Mariana Brochado; Monique Ferreira; Paula Baracho	(Dominican Republic) 2003 Santo Domingo	Swimming	Women's 4 × 200 m freestyle relay	12 Aug 1999	
Bronze	Carolina Moraes; Isabela Moraes	(Dominican Republic) 2003 Santo Domingo	Artistic swimming	Duet		
Bronze	Beatriz Leite; Camille Oliveira; Caroline Hildebrandt; Gláucia Souza; Isabela Moraes; Ludmilla Silva; Mariana Vigneron; Roberta Fernandes	(Dominican Republic) 2003 Santo Domingo	Artistic swimming	Team		
Silver	Thiago Monteiro	(Dominican Republic) 2003 Santo Domingo	Table tennis	Men's singles		
Bronze	Hugo Hoyama	(Dominican Republic) 2003 Santo Domingo	Table tennis	Men's singles		
Gold	Hugo Hoyama; Thiago Monteiro	(Dominican Republic) 2003 Santo Domingo	Table tennis	Men's doubles		
Silver	Bruno Anjos; Gustavo Tsuboi	(Dominican Republic) 2003 Santo Domingo	Table tennis	Men's doubles		
Bronze	Diogo Silva	(Dominican Republic) 2003 Santo Domingo	Taekwondo	Men's featherweight (-68 kg)		
Bronze	Walassi Aires	(Dominican Republic) 2003 Santo Domingo	Taekwondo	Men's heavyweight (+80 kg)		
Gold	Fernando Meligeni	(Dominican Republic) 2003 Santo Domingo	Tennis	Men's singles	10 Aug 2003	
Gold	Bruna Colósio; Joana Cortez	(Dominican Republic) 2003 Santo Domingo	Tennis	Women's doubles	9 Aug 2003	
Silver	Virgílio de Castilho	(Dominican Republic) 2003 Santo Domingo	Triathlon	Men's individual	10 Aug 2003	
Silver	Luizão Corrêa; Paulo Emilio Silva	(Dominican Republic) 2003 Santo Domingo	Beach volleyball	Men's tournament		
Bronze	Ana Richa; Larissa França	(Dominican Republic) 2003 Santo Domingo	Beach volleyball	Women's tournament		
Bronze	Men's volleyball team: Anderson Rodrigues André Heller André Nascimento Dante Amaral Giba Giovane Gávio Gustavo Endres Maurício Lima Nalbert Bitencourt Ricardo García Rodrigo Santana Sérgio Santos	(Dominican Republic) 2003 Santo Domingo	Volleyball	Men's tournament	15 Aug 2003	
Silver	Men's water polo team: André Capiberibe André Pessanha André Raposo Daniel Mameri Erik Seegerer Fábio Chiquidimo Felipe Perrone Gabriel Reis Lopes Leandro Ruiz Machado Roberto Seabra Rodrigo Shalom Vicente Henriques Yansel Gallindo	(Dominican Republic) 2003 Santo Domingo	Water polo	Men's tournament	10 Aug 2003	
Bronze	Women's water polo team: Ana Carolina Vasconcelos Andréa Henriques Camila Pedrosa Cláudia Graner Flávia Fernandes Maria Cecília Marques Mariana Roriz Mayla Siracusa Melina Teno Rubi Palmieri Tess Oliveira Viviane Filellini Costa	(Dominican Republic) 2003 Santo Domingo	Water polo	Women's tournament	10 Aug 2003	
Silver	Antoine Jaoude	(Dominican Republic) 2003 Santo Domingo	Wrestling	Men's freestyle heavyweight (-96 kg)		
Silver	Kléberson Davide	(Brazil) 2007 Rio de Janeiro	Athletics	Men's 800 m	28 Jul 2007	
Bronze	Fabiano Peçanha	(Brazil) 2007 Rio de Janeiro	Athletics	Men's 800 m	28 Jul 2007	
Gold	Hudson de Souza	(Brazil) 2007 Rio de Janeiro	Athletics	Men's 1500 m	25 Jul 2007	
Bronze	Marílson Gomes dos Santos	(Brazil) 2007 Rio de Janeiro	Athletics	Men's 5000 m	23 Jul 2007	
Silver	Marílson Gomes dos Santos	(Brazil) 2007 Rio de Janeiro	Athletics	Men's 10,000 m	27 Jul 2007	
Gold	Basílio de Moraes Jr. Rafael Ribeiro; Sandro Viana; Vicente Lenílson; José Carlos Moreira (heats)	(Brazil) 2007 Rio de Janeiro	Athletics	Men's 4 × 100 m relay	28 Jul 2007	
Gold	Franck Caldeira	(Brazil) 2007 Rio de Janeiro	Athletics	Men's marathon	29 Jul 2007	
Gold	Fábio Gomes da Silva	(Brazil) 2007 Rio de Janeiro	Athletics	Men's pole vault	28 Jul 2007	
Gold	Jadel Gregório	(Brazil) 2007 Rio de Janeiro	Athletics	Men's triple jump	28 Jul 2007	
Bronze	Alexon Maximiano	(Brazil) 2007 Rio de Janeiro	Athletics	Men's javelin throw	28 Jul 2007	
Bronze	Carlos Chinin	(Brazil) 2007 Rio de Janeiro	Athletics	Men's decathlon	24 Jul 2007	
Gold	Juliana Paula dos Santos	(Brazil) 2007 Rio de Janeiro	Athletics	Women's 800 m	27 Jul 2007	
Bronze	Lucélia Peres	(Brazil) 2007 Rio de Janeiro	Athletics	Women's 10,000 m	23 Jul 2007	
Gold	Sabine Heitling	(Brazil) 2007 Rio de Janeiro	Athletics	Women's 3000 m steeplechase	28 Jul 2007	
Bronze	Zenaide Vieira	(Brazil) 2007 Rio de Janeiro	Athletics	Women's 3000 m steeplechase	28 Jul 2007	
Silver	Márcia Narloch	(Brazil) 2007 Rio de Janeiro	Athletics	Women's marathon	22 Jul 2007	
Bronze	Sirlene Pinho	(Brazil) 2007 Rio de Janeiro	Athletics	Women's marathon	22 Jul 2007	
Gold	Fabiana Murer	(Brazil) 2007 Rio de Janeiro	Athletics	Women's pole vault	23 Jul 2007	
Gold	Maurren Maggi	(Brazil) 2007 Rio de Janeiro	Athletics	Women's long jump	25 Jul 2007	
Silver	Keila Costa	(Brazil) 2007 Rio de Janeiro	Athletics	Women's long jump	25 Jul 2007	
Silver	Keila Costa	(Brazil) 2007 Rio de Janeiro	Athletics	Women's triple jump	27 Jul 2007	
Bronze	Elisângela Adriano	(Brazil) 2007 Rio de Janeiro	Athletics	Women's discus throw	23 Jul 2007	
Bronze	Lucimara Silvestre	(Brazil) 2007 Rio de Janeiro	Athletics	Women's heptathlon	25 Jul 2007	
Bronze	Guilherme Kumasaka; Guilherme Pardo	(Brazil) 2007 Rio de Janeiro	Badminton	Men's doubles	17 Jul 2007	
Gold	Men's basketball team: Alex Garcia Caio Torres Guilherme Teichmann João Paulo Batista Marcelo Huertas Marcelinho Machado Marcus Vinicius Toledo Marquinhos Vieira Murilo Becker Nezinho dos Santos Paulo Sérgio Prestes Valtinho da Silva	(Brazil) 2007 Rio de Janeiro	Basketball	Men's tournament	29 Jul 2007	
Silver	Women's basketball team: Adriana Moisés Graziane Coelho Janeth Arcain Jucimara Dantas Karen Rocha Kelly Santos Isis Nascimento Micaela Jacintho Palmira Marçal Patrícia Ferreira Tatiana Conceição Soeli Zakrzeski	(Brazil) 2007 Rio de Janeiro	Basketball	Women's tournament	27 Jul 2007	
Silver	Fábio Rezende; Rodrigo Hermes	(Brazil) 2007 Rio de Janeiro	Bowling	Men's pairs		
Bronze	James Dean Pereira	(Brazil) 2007 Rio de Janeiro	Boxing	Men's bantamweight (-54 kg)		
Bronze	Davi Souza	(Brazil) 2007 Rio de Janeiro	Boxing	Men's featherweight (-57 kg)		
Silver	Éverton Lopes	(Brazil) 2007 Rio de Janeiro	Boxing	Men's lightweight (-60 kg)		
Bronze	Myke Carvalho	(Brazil) 2007 Rio de Janeiro	Boxing	Men's light welterweight (-64 kg)		
Gold	Pedro Lima	(Brazil) 2007 Rio de Janeiro	Boxing	Men's welterweight (-69 kg)		
Bronze	Glaucélio Abreu	(Brazil) 2007 Rio de Janeiro	Boxing	Men's middleweight (-75 kg)		
Bronze	Rafael Lima	(Brazil) 2007 Rio de Janeiro	Boxing	Men's heavyweight (-91 kg)		
Bronze	Antônio Rogério Nogueira	(Brazil) 2007 Rio de Janeiro	Boxing	Men's super heavyweight (+91 kg)		
Bronze	Nivalter Jesus	(Brazil) 2007 Rio de Janeiro	Canoeing	Men's C-1 500 m		
Bronze	Vilson Nascimento; Wladimir Moreno	(Brazil) 2007 Rio de Janeiro	Canoeing	Men's C-2 500 m		
Silver	Vilson Nascimento; Wladimir Moreno	(Brazil) 2007 Rio de Janeiro	Canoeing	Men's C-2 1000 m		
Bronze	Edson Isaías	(Brazil) 2007 Rio de Janeiro	Canoeing	Men's K-1 500 m		
Silver	Sebastián Cuattrin	(Brazil) 2007 Rio de Janeiro	Canoeing	Men's K-1 1000 m		
Gold	Carlos Campos; Edson Isaías; Roberto Maehler; Sebastián Cuattrin	(Brazil) 2007 Rio de Janeiro	Canoeing	Men's K-4 1000 m		
Bronze	Luciano Pagliarini	(Brazil) 2007 Rio de Janeiro	Cycling	Men's race individual (road)		
Silver	Rubens Donizete	(Brazil) 2007 Rio de Janeiro	Cycling	Men's mountain bike		
Bronze	Clemilda Fernandes	(Brazil) 2007 Rio de Janeiro	Cycling	Women's time trial (road)		
Silver	Ana Flávia Sgobin	(Brazil) 2007 Rio de Janeiro	Cycling	Women's BMX racing		
Silver	César Castro	(Brazil) 2007 Rio de Janeiro	Diving	Men's 3 m springboard		
Bronze	Juliana Veloso	(Brazil) 2007 Rio de Janeiro	Diving	Women's 10 m platform		
Silver	Rodrigo Pessoa	(Brazil) 2007 Rio de Janeiro	Equestrian	Jumping		
Bronze	Luísa Almeida; Renata Costa; Rogério Clementino	(Brazil) 2007 Rio de Janeiro	Equestrian	Dressage team		
Bronze	André Paro; Carlos Paro; Fabrício Salgado; Renan Guerreiro	(Brazil) 2007 Rio de Janeiro	Equestrian	Eventing team		
Gold	Bernardo Alves; César Almeida; Pedro Veniss; Rodrigo Pessoa	(Brazil) 2007 Rio de Janeiro	Equestrian	Jumping team		
Bronze	João Albuquerque e Souza	(Brazil) 2007 Rio de Janeiro	Fencing	Men's foil	14 Jul 2007	
Bronze	Renzo Agresta	(Brazil) 2007 Rio de Janeiro	Fencing	Men's sabre	18 Jul 2007	
Bronze	Clarisse Menezes	(Brazil) 2007 Rio de Janeiro	Fencing	Women's épée	17 Jul 2007	
Gold	Women's football team: Aline Pellegrino Andréia Suntaque Bárbara Barbosa Cristiane Daiane Rodrigues Daniela Alves Elaine Estrela Ester dos Santos Formiga Grazielle Nascimento Kátia Cilene Marta Maycon Pretinha Renata Costa Rosana dos Santos Tânia Maranhão Simone Jatobá	(Brazil) 2007 Rio de Janeiro	Football	Women's tournament	26 Jul 2007	
Gold	Men's futsal team: Betão Ciço Falcão Gabriel Leandro Simi Lenísio Marquinho Neto Rogério Tiago Valdin Vinícius	(Brazil) 2007 Rio de Janeiro	Futsal	Men's tournament	28 Jul 2007	
Gold	Diego Hypólito	(Brazil) 2007 Rio de Janeiro	Gymnastics	Artistic gymnastics men's floor exercise		
Gold	Mosiah Rodrigues	(Brazil) 2007 Rio de Janeiro	Gymnastics	Artistic gymnastics men's horizontal bar		
Bronze	Danilo Nogueira	(Brazil) 2007 Rio de Janeiro	Gymnastics	Artistic gymnastics men's horizontal bar		
Gold	Diego Hypólito	(Brazil) 2007 Rio de Janeiro	Gymnastics	Artistic gymnastics men's vault		
Silver	Adan Santos; Danilo Nogueira; Diego Hypólito; Luiz Anjos; Mosiah Rodrigues; Victor Rosa	(Brazil) 2007 Rio de Janeiro	Gymnastics	Artistic gymnastics men's all-around team		
Bronze	Daniele Hypólito	(Brazil) 2007 Rio de Janeiro	Gymnastics	Artistic gymnastics women's balance beam		
Bronze	Jade Barbosa	(Brazil) 2007 Rio de Janeiro	Gymnastics	Artistic gymnastics women's floor exercise		
Bronze	Laís Souza	(Brazil) 2007 Rio de Janeiro	Gymnastics	Artistic gymnastics women's uneven bars		
Gold	Jade Barbosa	(Brazil) 2007 Rio de Janeiro	Gymnastics	Artistic gymnastics women's vault		
Bronze	Laís Souza	(Brazil) 2007 Rio de Janeiro	Gymnastics	Artistic gymnastics women's vault		
Silver	Ana Cláudia Silva; Daiane dos Santos; Daniele Hypólito; Jade Barbosa; Khiuani Dias; Laís Souza	(Brazil) 2007 Rio de Janeiro	Gymnastics	Artistic gymnastics women's all-around team		
Bronze	Giovanna Matheus	(Brazil) 2007 Rio de Janeiro	Gymnastics	Trampoline gymnastics women's		
Bronze	Ana Paula Scheffer	(Brazil) 2007 Rio de Janeiro	Gymnastics	Rhythmic gymnastics individual hoop		
Gold	Daniela Leite; Luisa Matsuo; Marcela Menezes; Natália Sanchez; Nicole Muller; Tayanne Mantovaneli	(Brazil) 2007 Rio de Janeiro	Gymnastics	Rhythmic gymnastics group all-around		
Gold	Daniela Leite; Luisa Matsuo; Marcela Menezes; Natália Sanchez; Nicole Muller; Tayanne Mantovaneli	(Brazil) 2007 Rio de Janeiro	Gymnastics	Rhythmic gymnastics group hoops-clubs		
Gold	Daniela Leite; Luisa Matsuo; Marcela Menezes; Natália Sanchez; Nicole Muller; Tayanne Mantovaneli	(Brazil) 2007 Rio de Janeiro	Gymnastics	Rhythmic gymnastics group ropes		
Gold	Men's handball team: Alexandre Vasconcelos Bruno Santana Bruno Souza Carlos Ertel Danilo Silva Felipe Borges Fernando Pacheco Filho Gui Oliveira Hélio Justino Jaqson Kojoroski Jardel Pizzinato Leonardo Bortolini Maik dos Santos Renato Tupan Ruy Silvio Laureano	(Brazil) 2007 Rio de Janeiro	Handball	Men's tournament	22 Jul 2007	
Gold	Women's handball team: Alexandra do Nascimento Aline Santos Aline Waleska Rosas Chana Masson Daniela Piedade Darly de Paula Deonise Fachinello Eduarda Amorim Fabiana Diniz Fabiana Kuestner Idalina Mesquita Juceli Sales Lucila Vianna da Silva Milene Figueiredo Viviane Jacques	(Brazil) 2007 Rio de Janeiro	Handball	Women's tournament	21 Jul 2007	
Bronze	Alexandre Lee	(Brazil) 2007 Rio de Janeiro	Judo	Men's extra lightweight (-60 kg)		
Gold	João Derly	(Brazil) 2007 Rio de Janeiro	Judo	Men's half lightweight (-66 kg)		
Silver	Leandro Guilheiro	(Brazil) 2007 Rio de Janeiro	Judo	Men's lightweight (-73 kg)		
Gold	Tiago Camilo	(Brazil) 2007 Rio de Janeiro	Judo	Men's middleweight (-90 kg)		
Bronze	Luciano Corrêa	(Brazil) 2007 Rio de Janeiro	Judo	Men's half heavyweight (-100 kg)		
Silver	João Gabriel Schlittler	(Brazil) 2007 Rio de Janeiro	Judo	Men's heavyweight (+100 kg)		
Silver	Daniela Polzin	(Brazil) 2007 Rio de Janeiro	Judo	Women's extra lightweight (-48 kg)		
Silver	Érika Miranda	(Brazil) 2007 Rio de Janeiro	Judo	Women's half lightweight (-52 kg)		
Gold	Danielle Zangrando	(Brazil) 2007 Rio de Janeiro	Judo	Women's lightweight (-57 kg)		
Silver	Danielli Yuri	(Brazil) 2007 Rio de Janeiro	Judo	Women's half middleweight (-63 kg)		
Silver	Mayra Aguiar	(Brazil) 2007 Rio de Janeiro	Judo	Women's middleweight (-70 kg)		
Gold	Edinanci Silva	(Brazil) 2007 Rio de Janeiro	Judo	Women's half heavyweight (-78 kg)		
Bronze	Priscila Marques	(Brazil) 2007 Rio de Janeiro	Judo	Women's heavyweight (+78 kg)		
Bronze	Douglas Brose	(Brazil) 2007 Rio de Janeiro	Karate	Men's kumite (-60 kg)		
Silver	Carlos Lourenço	(Brazil) 2007 Rio de Janeiro	Karate	Men's kumite (-65 kg)		
Bronze	Vinícius Souza	(Brazil) 2007 Rio de Janeiro	Karate	Men's kumite (-70 kg)		
Bronze	Nelson Sardenberg	(Brazil) 2007 Rio de Janeiro	Karate	Men's kumite (-80 kg)		
Gold	Juarez Santos	(Brazil) 2007 Rio de Janeiro	Karate	Men's kumite (+80 kg)		
Silver	Valéria Kumizaki	(Brazil) 2007 Rio de Janeiro	Karate	Women's kumite (-53 kg)		
Gold	Lucélia Ribeiro	(Brazil) 2007 Rio de Janeiro	Karate	Women's kumite (+60 kg)		
Gold	Yane Marques	(Brazil) 2007 Rio de Janeiro	Modern pentathlon	Women's individual		
Gold	Marcel Stürmer	(Brazil) 2007 Rio de Janeiro	Roller sports	Artistic free skating men's		
Bronze	Juliana Almeida	(Brazil) 2007 Rio de Janeiro	Roller sports	Artistic free skating women's		
Bronze	Marcelus dos Santos	(Brazil) 2007 Rio de Janeiro	Rowing	Men's single sculls		
Bronze	Allan Bitencourt; Anderson Nocetti	(Brazil) 2007 Rio de Janeiro	Rowing	Men's coxless pair-oared shells		
Silver	Alexandre Ribas; Allan Bitencourt; Anderson Nocetti; Gibran Cunha; José Roberto Nascimento; Leandro Tozzo; Marcelus dos Santos; Nilton Alonso; Renan Castro	(Brazil) 2007 Rio de Janeiro	Rowing	Men's eight-oared shells		
Silver	Robert Scheidt	(Brazil) 2007 Rio de Janeiro	Sailing	Men's Laser class		
Gold	Ricardo Winicki	(Brazil) 2007 Rio de Janeiro	Sailing	Men's sailboard		
Gold	Alexandre Paradeda; Pedro Amaral	(Brazil) 2007 Rio de Janeiro	Sailing	Snipe class		
Bronze	Cláudio Biekarck; Gunnar Ficker; Marcelo Batista da Silva	(Brazil) 2007 Rio de Janeiro	Sailing	Lightning class		
Gold	Alexandre Silva; Daniel Santiago; João Carlos Jordão; Maurício Santa Cruz	(Brazil) 2007 Rio de Janeiro	Sailing	J/24 class		
Bronze	Adriana Kostiw	(Brazil) 2007 Rio de Janeiro	Sailing	Women's Laser Radial class		
Silver	Patrícia Freitas	(Brazil) 2007 Rio de Janeiro	Sailing	Women's sailboard		
Silver	Júlio Almeida	(Brazil) 2007 Rio de Janeiro	Shooting	Men's 10 m air pistol		
Bronze	Fernando Cardoso Jr.	(Brazil) 2007 Rio de Janeiro	Shooting	Men's 25 m rapid fire pistol		
Bronze	Luciano Barbosa; Rafael Alarçón; Ronivaldo Conceição	(Brazil) 2007 Rio de Janeiro	Squash	Men's team		
Gold	César Cielo Filho	(Brazil) 2007 Rio de Janeiro	Swimming	Men's 50 m freestyle	22 Jul 2007	
Silver	Nicholas Santos	(Brazil) 2007 Rio de Janeiro	Swimming	Men's 50 m freestyle	22 Jul 2007	
Bronze	Thiago Pereira	(Brazil) 2007 Rio de Janeiro	Swimming	Men's 100 m backstroke	22 Jul 2007	
Gold	Kaio de Almeida	(Brazil) 2007 Rio de Janeiro	Swimming	Men's 100 m butterfly	18 Jul 2007	
Silver	Gabriel Mangabeira	(Brazil) 2007 Rio de Janeiro	Swimming	Men's 100 m butterfly	18 Jul 2007	
Gold	César Cielo Filho	(Brazil) 2007 Rio de Janeiro	Swimming	Men's 100 m freestyle	18 Jul 2007	
Gold	Thiago Pereira	(Brazil) 2007 Rio de Janeiro	Swimming	Men's 200 m backstroke	19 Jul 2007	
Bronze	Lucas Salatta	(Brazil) 2007 Rio de Janeiro	Swimming	Men's 200 m backstroke	19 Jul 2007	
Gold	Thiago Pereira	(Brazil) 2007 Rio de Janeiro	Swimming	Men's 200 m breaststroke	21 Jul 2007	
Silver	Henrique Barbosa	(Brazil) 2007 Rio de Janeiro	Swimming	Men's 200 m breaststroke	21 Jul 2007	
Gold	Kaio de Almeida	(Brazil) 2007 Rio de Janeiro	Swimming	Men's 200 m butterfly	21 Jul 2007	
Gold	Thiago Pereira	(Brazil) 2007 Rio de Janeiro	Swimming	Men's 200 m medley	20 Jul 2007	
Bronze	Armando Negreiros	(Brazil) 2007 Rio de Janeiro	Swimming	Men's 400 m freestyle	18 Jul 2007	
Gold	Thiago Pereira	(Brazil) 2007 Rio de Janeiro	Swimming	Men's 400 m medley	17 Jul 2007	
Gold	César Cielo Filho; Eduardo Deboni; Fernando Silva; Nicolas Oliveira; Nicholas Santos (heats); Thiago Pereira (heats)	(Brazil) 2007 Rio de Janeiro	Swimming	Men's 4 × 100 m freestyle relay	20 Jul 2007	
Silver	César Cielo Filho; Henrique Barbosa; Kaio de Almeida; Thiago Pereira; Eduardo Deboni (heats); Felipe Lima (heats); Gabriel Mangabeira (heats); Lucas Salatta (heats)	(Brazil) 2007 Rio de Janeiro	Swimming	Men's 4 × 100 m medley relay	22 Jul 2007	
Gold	Lucas Salatta; Nicolas Oliveira; Rodrigo Castro; Thiago Pereira	(Brazil) 2007 Rio de Janeiro	Swimming	Men's 4 × 200 m freestyle relay	20 Jul 2007	
Bronze	Allan do Carmo	(Brazil) 2007 Rio de Janeiro	Swimming	Men's marathon 10 km	14 Jul 2007	
Bronze	Flávia Delaroli	(Brazil) 2007 Rio de Janeiro	Swimming	Women's 50 m freestyle	17 Dec 2007	(Note: Originally ranked fourth, inherited the bronze medal after the disqualification of the gold medalist Rebeca Gusmão.)
Silver	Fabíola Molina	(Brazil) 2007 Rio de Janeiro	Swimming	Women's 100 m backstroke	19 Jul 2007	
Bronze	Gabriella Silva	(Brazil) 2007 Rio de Janeiro	Swimming	Women's 100 m butterfly	18 Jul 2007	
Silver	Flávia Delaroli	(Brazil) 2007 Rio de Janeiro	Swimming	Women's 100 m freestyle	17 Dec 2007	(Note: Originally bronze medalist, inherited the silver medal after the disqualification of the gold medalist Rebeca Gusmão.)
Bronze	Daiene Dias	(Brazil) 2007 Rio de Janeiro	Swimming	Women's 200 m butterfly	21 Jul 2007	
Bronze	Monique Ferreira	(Brazil) 2007 Rio de Janeiro	Swimming	Women's 200 m freestyle	20 Jul 2007	
Bronze	Manuella Lyrio; Monique Ferreira; Paula Baracho; Tatiana Lemos; Joanna Maranhão (heats)	(Brazil) 2007 Rio de Janeiro	Swimming	Women's 4 × 200 m freestyle relay	18 Jul 2007	
Silver	Poliana Okimoto	(Brazil) 2007 Rio de Janeiro	Swimming	Women's marathon 10 km	14 Jul 2007	
Bronze	Caroline Hildebrandt; Lara Teixeira	(Brazil) 2007 Rio de Janeiro	Artistic swimming	Duet		
Bronze	Beatriz Feres; Branca Feres; Caroline Hildebrandt; Giovana Stephan; Gláucia Souza; Lara Teixeira; Michelle Frota; Nayara Figueira; Pâmela Nogueira	(Brazil) 2007 Rio de Janeiro	Artistic swimming	Team		
Bronze	Hugo Hoyama	(Brazil) 2007 Rio de Janeiro	Table tennis	Men's singles		
Bronze	Thiago Monteiro	(Brazil) 2007 Rio de Janeiro	Table tennis	Men's singles		
Gold	Gustavo Tsuboi; Hugo Hoyama; Thiago Monteiro	(Brazil) 2007 Rio de Janeiro	Table tennis	Men's team		
Silver	Márcio Wenceslau	(Brazil) 2007 Rio de Janeiro	Taekwondo	Men's flyweight (-58 kg)		
Gold	Diogo Silva	(Brazil) 2007 Rio de Janeiro	Taekwondo	Men's featherweight (-68 kg)		
Bronze	Leonardo Santos	(Brazil) 2007 Rio de Janeiro	Taekwondo	Men's heavyweight (+80 kg)		
Silver	Natália Falavigna	(Brazil) 2007 Rio de Janeiro	Taekwondo	Women's heavyweight (+67 kg)		
Gold	Flávio Saretta	(Brazil) 2007 Rio de Janeiro	Tennis	Men's singles	28 Jul 2007	
Bronze	Joana Cortez; Teliana Pereira	(Brazil) 2007 Rio de Janeiro	Tennis	Women's doubles	22 Jul 2007	
Bronze	Juraci Moreira	(Brazil) 2007 Rio de Janeiro	Triathlon	Men's individual	15 Jul 2007	
Gold	Emanuel Rego; Ricardo Santos	(Brazil) 2007 Rio de Janeiro	Beach volleyball	Men's tournament		
Gold	Juliana Felisberta; Larissa França	(Brazil) 2007 Rio de Janeiro	Beach volleyball	Women's tournament		
Gold	Men's volleyball team: Anderson Rodrigues André Heller André Nascimento Bruno Rezende Dante Amaral Giba Gustavo Endres Marcelo Elgarten Murilo Endres Rodrigo Santana Samuel Fuchs Sérgio Santos	(Brazil) 2007 Rio de Janeiro	Volleyball	Men's tournament	28 Jul 2007	
Silver	Women's volleyball team: Carolina Albuquerque Érika Coimbra Fabiana Alvim Fabiana Claudino Fofão Marianne Steinbrecher Paula Pequeno Regiane Bidias Sassá Sheilla Castro Thaísa Menezes Walewska Oliveira	(Brazil) 2007 Rio de Janeiro	Volleyball	Women's tournament	19 Jul 2007	
Silver	Men's water polo team: André Pessanha André Raposo Bruno Nolasco Daniel Mameri Erik Seegerer Felipe Franco Gabriel Reis Lopes Lucas Vita Leandro Ruiz Machado Luis Capelache Roberto Seabra Rodrigo Shalom Vicente Henriques	(Brazil) 2007 Rio de Janeiro	Water polo	Men's tournament	26 Jul 2007	
Gold	Marcelo Giardi	(Brazil) 2007 Rio de Janeiro	Water skiing	Men's wakeboard		
Bronze	Felipe Macedo	(Brazil) 2007 Rio de Janeiro	Wrestling	Men's Greco-Roman welterweight (-74 kg)		
Silver	Luiz Fernandes	(Brazil) 2007 Rio de Janeiro	Wrestling	Men's Greco-Roman heavyweight (-96 kg)		
Bronze	Rosângela Conceição	(Brazil) 2007 Rio de Janeiro	Wrestling	Women's freestyle heavyweight (-72 kg)		
Bronze	Bruno Lins	(Mexico) 2011 Guadalajara	Athletics	Men's 200 m	27 Oct 2011	
Silver	Kléberson Davide	(Mexico) 2011 Guadalajara	Athletics	Men's 800 m	28 Oct 2011	
Gold	Leandro Prates	(Mexico) 2011 Guadalajara	Athletics	Men's 1500 m	26 Oct 2011	
Silver	Hudson de Souza	(Mexico) 2011 Guadalajara	Athletics	Men's 3000 m steeplechase	28 Oct 2011	
Bronze	Joílson da Silva	(Mexico) 2011 Guadalajara	Athletics	Men's 5000 m	24 Oct 2011	
Gold	Marílson Gomes dos Santos	(Mexico) 2011 Guadalajara	Athletics	Men's 10,000 m	27 Oct 2011	
Bronze	Giovani dos Santos	(Mexico) 2011 Guadalajara	Athletics	Men's 10,000 m	27 Oct 2011	
Gold	Ailson Feitosa; Bruno Lins; Nilson André; Sandro Viana; Carlos Moraes Jr. (heats); Mateus Facho Inocêncio (heats)	(Mexico) 2011 Guadalajara	Athletics	Men's 4 × 100 m relay	28 Oct 2011	
Gold	Solonei da Silva	(Mexico) 2011 Guadalajara	Athletics	Men's marathon	30 Oct 2011	
Bronze	Jefferson Sabino	(Mexico) 2011 Guadalajara	Athletics	Men's triple jump	27 Oct 2011	
Bronze	Ronald Julião	(Mexico) 2011 Guadalajara	Athletics	Men's discus throw	24 Oct 2011	
Gold	Rosângela Santos	(Mexico) 2011 Guadalajara	Athletics	Women's 100 m	25 Oct 2011	
Gold	Ana Cláudia Lemos	(Mexico) 2011 Guadalajara	Athletics	Women's 200 m	27 Oct 2011	
Bronze	Geisa Coutinho	(Mexico) 2011 Guadalajara	Athletics	Women's 400 m	26 Oct 2011	
Bronze	Sabine Heitling	(Mexico) 2011 Guadalajara	Athletics	Women's 3000 m steeplechase	28 Oct 2011	
Silver	Cruz Nonata da Silva	(Mexico) 2011 Guadalajara	Athletics	Women's 5000 m	27 Oct 2011	
Silver	Cruz Nonata da Silva	(Mexico) 2011 Guadalajara	Athletics	Women's 10,000 m	24 Oct 2011	
Gold	Ana Cláudia Lemos; Franciela Krasucki; Rosângela Santos; Vanda Gomes	(Mexico) 2011 Guadalajara	Athletics	Women's 4 × 100 m relay	28 Oct 2011	
Silver	Bárbara de Oliveira; Geisa Coutinho; Jailma de Lima; Joelma Sousa	(Mexico) 2011 Guadalajara	Athletics	Women's 4 × 400 m relay	28 Oct 2011	
Gold	Adriana Aparecida da Silva	(Mexico) 2011 Guadalajara	Athletics	Women's marathon	23 Oct 2011	
Gold	Maurren Maggi	(Mexico) 2011 Guadalajara	Athletics	Women's long jump	26 Oct 2011	
Silver	Fabiana Murer	(Mexico) 2011 Guadalajara	Athletics	Women's pole vault	24 Oct 2011	
Gold	Lucimara Silvestre	(Mexico) 2011 Guadalajara	Athletics	Women's heptathlon	26 Oct 2011	
Bronze	Daniel Paiola	(Mexico) 2011 Guadalajara	Badminton	Men's singles	18 Oct 2011	
Bronze	Women's basketball team: Bárbara de Queiroz Carina de Souza Clarissa dos Santos Damiris Dantas Érika de Souza Gilmara Justino Izabela de Andrade Izi Castro Marques Jaqueline Silvestre Palmira Marçal Tássia Carcavalli Silvia Valente	(Mexico) 2011 Guadalajara	Basketball	Women's tournament	25 Oct 2011	
Bronze	Marcelo Suartz	(Mexico) 2011 Guadalajara	Bowling	Men's individual	27 Oct 2011	
Bronze	Julião Neto	(Mexico) 2011 Guadalajara	Boxing	Men's flyweight (-52 kg)	26 Oct 2011	
Bronze	Robenílson de Jesus	(Mexico) 2011 Guadalajara	Boxing	Men's bantamweight (-56 kg)	25 Oct 2011	
Silver	Robson Conceição	(Mexico) 2011 Guadalajara	Boxing	Men's lightweight (-60 kg)	29 Oct 2011	
Bronze	Éverton Lopes	(Mexico) 2011 Guadalajara	Boxing	Men's light welterweight (-64 kg)	25 Oct 2011	
Bronze	Myke Carvalho	(Mexico) 2011 Guadalajara	Boxing	Men's welterweight (-69 kg)	26 Oct 2011	
Silver	Yamaguchi Falcão	(Mexico) 2011 Guadalajara	Boxing	Men's light heavyweight (-81 kg)	29 Oct 2011	
Bronze	Roseli Feitosa	(Mexico) 2011 Guadalajara	Boxing	Women's middleweight (-75 kg)	26 Oct 2011	
Silver	Nivalter Jesus	(Mexico) 2011 Guadalajara	Canoeing	Men's C-1 200 m	29 Oct 2011	
Silver	Erlon Silva; Ronilson Oliveira	(Mexico) 2011 Guadalajara	Canoeing	Men's C-2 1000 m	28 Oct 2011	
Bronze	Gilvan Ribeiro; Givago Ribeiro	(Mexico) 2011 Guadalajara	Canoeing	Men's K-2 200 m	29 Oct 2011	
Bronze	Celso Oliveira; Gilvan Ribeiro; Givago Ribeiro; Roberto Maehler	(Mexico) 2011 Guadalajara	Canoeing	Men's K-4 1000 m	27 Oct 2011	
Bronze	César Castro	(Mexico) 2011 Guadalajara	Diving	Men's 3 m springboard	27 Oct 2011	
Bronze	Bernardo Alves	(Mexico) 2011 Guadalajara	Equestrian	Jumping	29 Oct 2011	
Bronze	Jesper Martendal; Marcelo Tosi; Márcio Jorge; Ruy Fonseca; Serguei Fofanoff	(Mexico) 2011 Guadalajara	Equestrian	Eventing team	23 Oct 2011	
Silver	Álvaro de Miranda Neto; Bernardo Alves; Karina Johannpeter; Rodrigo Pessoa	(Mexico) 2011 Guadalajara	Equestrian	Jumping team	27 Oct 2011	
Bronze	Guilherme Toldo	(Mexico) 2011 Guadalajara	Fencing	Men's foil	25 Oct 2011	
Bronze	Fernando Scavasin; Guilherme Toldo; Heitor Shimbo; Renzo Agresta	(Mexico) 2011 Guadalajara	Fencing	Men's foil team	28 Oct 2011	
Bronze	Heitor Shimbo; Renzo Agresta; Tywilliam Pacheco; William de Moraes	(Mexico) 2011 Guadalajara	Fencing	Men's sabre team	29 Oct 2011	
Silver	Women's football team: Bárbara Barbosa Bia Zaneratto Daiane Rodrigues Daniele Batista Debinha Formiga Francielle Alberto Grazielle Nascimento Karen Rocha Ketlen Wiggers Maurine Gonçalves Maycon Renata Costa Renata Diniz Rosana dos Santos Tânia Maranhão Thaís Guedes Thaís Picarte	(Mexico) 2011 Guadalajara	Football	Women's tournament	27 Oct 2011	
Gold	Diego Hypólito	(Mexico) 2011 Guadalajara	Gymnastics	Artistic gymnastics men's floor exercise	27 Oct 2011	
Silver	Arthur Zanetti	(Mexico) 2011 Guadalajara	Gymnastics	Artistic gymnastics men's rings	27 Oct 2011	
Gold	Diego Hypólito	(Mexico) 2011 Guadalajara	Gymnastics	Artistic gymnastics men's vault	28 Oct 2011	
Gold	Arthur Zanetti; Diego Hypólito; Francisco Barretto Jr. Pericles Silva; Petrix Barbosa; Sérgio Sasaki Jr.	(Mexico) 2011 Guadalajara	Gymnastics	Artistic gymnastics men's all-around team	25 Oct 2011	
Silver	Rafael Andrade	(Mexico) 2011 Guadalajara	Gymnastics	Trampoline gymnastics men's	18 Oct 2011	
Bronze	Daniele Hypólito	(Mexico) 2011 Guadalajara	Gymnastics	Artistic gymnastics women's balance beam	28 Oct 2011	
Bronze	Daniele Hypólito	(Mexico) 2011 Guadalajara	Gymnastics	Artistic gymnastics women's floor exercise	28 Oct 2011	
Bronze	Angélica Kvieczynski	(Mexico) 2011 Guadalajara	Gymnastics	Rhythmic gymnastics individual all-around	15 Oct 2011	
Bronze	Angélica Kvieczynski	(Mexico) 2011 Guadalajara	Gymnastics	Rhythmic gymnastics individual ball	17 Oct 2011	
Silver	Angélica Kvieczynski	(Mexico) 2011 Guadalajara	Gymnastics	Rhythmic gymnastics individual clubs	18 Oct 2011	
Bronze	Angélica Kvieczynski	(Mexico) 2011 Guadalajara	Gymnastics	Rhythmic gymnastics individual hoop	17 Oct 2011	
Gold	Bianca Mendonça; Dayane Amaral; Debora Falda; Drielly Altoe; Eliane Sampaio; Luisa Matsuo	(Mexico) 2011 Guadalajara	Gymnastics	Rhythmic gymnastics group all-around	16 Oct 2011	
Gold	Bianca Mendonça; Dayane Amaral; Debora Falda; Drielly Altoe; Eliane Sampaio; Luisa Matsuo	(Mexico) 2011 Guadalajara	Gymnastics	Rhythmic gymnastics group balls	17 Oct 2011	
Gold	Bianca Mendonça; Dayane Amaral; Debora Falda; Drielly Altoe; Eliane Sampaio; Luisa Matsuo	(Mexico) 2011 Guadalajara	Gymnastics	Rhythmic gymnastics group hoops-ribbons	18 Oct 2011	
Silver	Men's handball team: Ales Silva Bruno Santana Fábio Chiuffa Felipe Borges Fernando Pacheco Filho Gustavo Cardoso Gil Pires Henrique Teixeira Jaqson Kojoroski Leonardo Bortolini Maik dos Santos Marcos Paulo dos Santos Renato Tupan Ruy Thiagus dos Santos Vinícius Teixeira	(Mexico) 2011 Guadalajara	Handball	Men's tournament	24 Oct 2011	
Gold	Women's handball team: Alexandra do Nascimento Ana Paula Belo Bárbara Arenhart Chana Masson Daniela Piedade Eduarda Amorim Fabiana Diniz Fernanda França Francine Moraes Jéssica Quintino Mayara Moura Moniky Bancilon Samira Rocha Silvia Pinheiro	(Mexico) 2011 Guadalajara	Handball	Women's tournament	23 Oct 2011	
Gold	Felipe Kitadai	(Mexico) 2011 Guadalajara	Judo	Men's extra lightweight (-60 kg)	29 Oct 2011	
Gold	Leandro Cunha	(Mexico) 2011 Guadalajara	Judo	Men's half lightweight (-66 kg)	28 Oct 2011	
Gold	Bruno Mendonça	(Mexico) 2011 Guadalajara	Judo	Men's lightweight (-73 kg)	28 Oct 2011	
Gold	Leandro Guilheiro	(Mexico) 2011 Guadalajara	Judo	Men's half middleweight (-81 kg)	27 Oct 2011	
Gold	Tiago Camilo	(Mexico) 2011 Guadalajara	Judo	Men's middleweight (-90 kg)	27 Oct 2011	
Gold	Luciano Corrêa	(Mexico) 2011 Guadalajara	Judo	Men's half heavyweight (-100 kg)	26 Oct 2011	
Silver	Rafael Silva	(Mexico) 2011 Guadalajara	Judo	Men's heavyweight (+100 kg)	26 Oct 2011	
Bronze	Sarah Menezes	(Mexico) 2011 Guadalajara	Judo	Women's extra lightweight (-48 kg)	29 Oct 2011	
Silver	Érika Miranda	(Mexico) 2011 Guadalajara	Judo	Women's half lightweight (-52 kg)	29 Oct 2011	
Silver	Rafaela Silva	(Mexico) 2011 Guadalajara	Judo	Women's lightweight (-57 kg)	28 Oct 2011	
Bronze	Maria Portela	(Mexico) 2011 Guadalajara	Judo	Women's middleweight (-70 kg)	27 Oct 2011	
Bronze	Mayra Aguiar	(Mexico) 2011 Guadalajara	Judo	Women's half heavyweight (-78 kg)	27 Oct 2011	
Bronze	Maria Suelen Altheman	(Mexico) 2011 Guadalajara	Judo	Women's heavyweight (+78 kg)	26 Oct 2011	
Bronze	Douglas Brose	(Mexico) 2011 Guadalajara	Karate	Men's kumite (-60 kg)	28 Oct 2011	
Bronze	Wellington Barbosa	(Mexico) 2011 Guadalajara	Karate	Men's kumite (+84 kg)	27 Oct 2011	
Bronze	Jéssica Cândido	(Mexico) 2011 Guadalajara	Karate	Women's kumite (-50 kg)	29 Oct 2011	
Bronze	Valéria Kumizaki	(Mexico) 2011 Guadalajara	Karate	Women's kumite (-55 kg)	29 Oct 2011	
Gold	Lucélia Ribeiro	(Mexico) 2011 Guadalajara	Karate	Women's kumite (-68 kg)	28 Oct 2011	
Silver	Yane Marques	(Mexico) 2011 Guadalajara	Modern pentathlon	Women's individual	15 Oct 2011	
Gold	Marcel Stürmer	(Mexico) 2011 Guadalajara	Roller sports	Artistic free skating men's	24 Oct 2011	
Bronze	Talitha Hass	(Mexico) 2011 Guadalajara	Roller sports	Artistic free skating women's	24 Oct 2011	
Silver	Alexis Mestre; João Borges	(Mexico) 2011 Guadalajara	Rowing	Men's coxless pair-oared shells	18 Oct 2011	
Silver	Fabiana Beltrame	(Mexico) 2011 Guadalajara	Rowing	Women's lightweight single sculls	19 Oct 2011	
Gold	Ricardo Winicki	(Mexico) 2011 Guadalajara	Sailing	Men's sailboard	23 Oct 2011	
Gold	Matheus Dellagnello	(Mexico) 2011 Guadalajara	Sailing	Sunfish class	23 Oct 2011	
Gold	Alexandre do Amaral; Gabriel Borges	(Mexico) 2011 Guadalajara	Sailing	Snipe class	23 Oct 2011	
Silver	Bernardo Arndt; Bruno Oliveira	(Mexico) 2011 Guadalajara	Sailing	Hobie 16 class	23 Oct 2011	
Bronze	Cláudio Biekarck; Gunnar Ficker; Marcelo Batista da Silva	(Mexico) 2011 Guadalajara	Sailing	Lightning class	23 Oct 2011	
Gold	Alexandre Silva; Daniel Santiago; Guilherme Hamelmann; Maurício Santa Cruz	(Mexico) 2011 Guadalajara	Sailing	J/24 class	23 Oct 2011	
Gold	Patrícia Freitas	(Mexico) 2011 Guadalajara	Sailing	Women's sailboard	23 Oct 2011	
Bronze	Júlio Almeida	(Mexico) 2011 Guadalajara	Shooting	Men's 10 m air pistol	16 Oct 2011	
Bronze	Júlio Almeida	(Mexico) 2011 Guadalajara	Shooting	Men's 50 m pistol	18 Oct 2011	
Bronze	Bruno Heck	(Mexico) 2011 Guadalajara	Shooting	Men's 50 m rifle three positions	21 Oct 2011	
Bronze	Roberto Schmits	(Mexico) 2011 Guadalajara	Shooting	Men's trap	19 Oct 2011	
Bronze	Luís da Graça	(Mexico) 2011 Guadalajara	Shooting	Men's double trap	20 Oct 2011	
Gold	Ana Luiza Souza Lima	(Mexico) 2011 Guadalajara	Shooting	Women's 25 m pistol	19 Oct 2011	
Bronze	Rafael Fernandes; Vinicius de Lima; Vinicius Rodrigues	(Mexico) 2011 Guadalajara	Squash	Men's team	20 Oct 2011	
Gold	César Cielo Filho	(Mexico) 2011 Guadalajara	Swimming	Men's 50 m freestyle	20 Oct 2011	
Silver	Bruno Fratus	(Mexico) 2011 Guadalajara	Swimming	Men's 50 m freestyle	20 Oct 2011	
Gold	Thiago Pereira	(Mexico) 2011 Guadalajara	Swimming	Men's 100 m backstroke	17 Oct 2011	
Bronze	Guilherme Guido	(Mexico) 2011 Guadalajara	Swimming	Men's 100 m backstroke	17 Oct 2011	
Gold	Felipe França	(Mexico) 2011 Guadalajara	Swimming	Men's 100 m breaststroke	16 Oct 2011	
Silver	Felipe Lima	(Mexico) 2011 Guadalajara	Swimming	Men's 100 m breaststroke	16 Oct 2011	
Gold	César Cielo Filho	(Mexico) 2011 Guadalajara	Swimming	Men's 100 m freestyle	16 Oct 2011	
Gold	Thiago Pereira	(Mexico) 2011 Guadalajara	Swimming	Men's 200 m backstroke	21 Oct 2011	
Bronze	Thiago Pereira	(Mexico) 2011 Guadalajara	Swimming	Men's 200 m breaststroke	18 Oct 2011	
Gold	Leonardo de Deus	(Mexico) 2011 Guadalajara	Swimming	Men's 200 m butterfly	17 Oct 2011	
Bronze	Kaio de Almeida	(Mexico) 2011 Guadalajara	Swimming	Men's 200 m butterfly	17 Oct 2011	
Gold	Thiago Pereira	(Mexico) 2011 Guadalajara	Swimming	Men's 200 m medley	19 Oct 2011	
Bronze	Henrique Rodrigues	(Mexico) 2011 Guadalajara	Swimming	Men's 200 m medley	19 Oct 2011	
Gold	Thiago Pereira	(Mexico) 2011 Guadalajara	Swimming	Men's 400 m medley	15 Oct 2011	
Gold	Bruno Fratus; César Cielo Filho; Nicholas Santos; Nicolas Oliveira; Gabriel Mangabeira (heats); Henrique Rodrigues (heats); Thiago Pereira (heats)	(Mexico) 2011 Guadalajara	Swimming	Men's 4 × 100 m freestyle relay	16 Oct 2011	
Gold	César Cielo Filho; Felipe França; Gabriel Mangabeira; Guilherme Guido; Bruno Fratus (heats); Felipe Lima (heats); Kaio de Almeida (heats); Thiago Pereira (heats)	(Mexico) 2011 Guadalajara	Swimming	Men's 4 × 100 m medley relay	21 Oct 2011	
Silver	André Schultz; Leonardo de Deus; Nicolas Oliveira; Thiago Pereira; Diogo Yabe (heats); Giuliano Rocco (heats); Lucas Kanieski (heats)	(Mexico) 2011 Guadalajara	Swimming	Men's 4 × 200 m freestyle relay	19 Oct 2011	
Silver	Graciele Herrmann	(Mexico) 2011 Guadalajara	Swimming	Women's 50 m freestyle	21 Oct 2011	
Silver	Daynara de Paula	(Mexico) 2011 Guadalajara	Swimming	Women's 100 m butterfly	15 Oct 2011	
Bronze	Joanna Maranhão	(Mexico) 2011 Guadalajara	Swimming	Women's 200 m medley	18 Oct 2011	
Silver	Joanna Maranhão	(Mexico) 2011 Guadalajara	Swimming	Women's 400 m medley	15 Oct 2011	
Silver	Daynara de Paula; Flávia Delaroli; Michelle Lenhardt; Tatiana Lemos; Graciele Herrmann (heats)	(Mexico) 2011 Guadalajara	Swimming	Women's 4 × 100 m freestyle relay	15 Oct 2011	
Bronze	Daynara de Paula; Fabíola Molina; Tatiana Lemos; Tatiane Sakemi	(Mexico) 2011 Guadalajara	Swimming	Women's 4 × 100 m medley relay	21 Oct 2011	
Silver	Jéssica Cavalheiro; Joanna Maranhão; Manuella Lyrio; Tatiana Lemos; Gabriela Rocha (heats); Larissa Cieslak (heats); Sarah Correa (heats); Thamy Ventorin (heats)	(Mexico) 2011 Guadalajara	Swimming	Women's 4 × 200 m freestyle relay	18 Oct 2011	
Silver	Poliana Okimoto	(Mexico) 2011 Guadalajara	Swimming	Women's marathon 10 km	22 Oct 2011	
Bronze	Lara Teixeira; Nayara Figueira	(Mexico) 2011 Guadalajara	Artistic swimming	Duet	20 Oct 2011	
Bronze	Giovana Stephan; Joseane Costa; Lara Teixeira; Lorena Molinos; Maria Bruno; Maria Pereira; Nayara Figueira; Pâmela Nogueira	(Mexico) 2011 Guadalajara	Artistic swimming	Team	21 Oct 2011	
Gold	Gustavo Tsuboi; Hugo Hoyama; Thiago Monteiro	(Mexico) 2011 Guadalajara	Table tennis	Men's team	17 Oct 2011	
Bronze	Márcio Wenceslau	(Mexico) 2011 Guadalajara	Taekwondo	Men's flyweight (-58 kg)	15 Oct 2011	
Silver	Rogério Dutra da Silva	(Mexico) 2011 Guadalajara	Tennis	Men's singles	22 Oct 2011	
Bronze	Ana Clara Duarte; Rogério Dutra da Silva	(Mexico) 2011 Guadalajara	Tennis	Mixed doubles	21 Oct 2011	
Gold	Reinaldo Colucci	(Mexico) 2011 Guadalajara	Triathlon	Men's individual	23 Oct 2011	
Bronze	Pâmella Nascimento	(Mexico) 2011 Guadalajara	Triathlon	Women's individual	23 Oct 2011	
Gold	Alison Cerutti; Emanuel Rego	(Mexico) 2011 Guadalajara	Beach volleyball	Men's tournament	22 Oct 2011	
Gold	Juliana Felisberta; Larissa França	(Mexico) 2011 Guadalajara	Beach volleyball	Women's tournament	21 Oct 2011	
Gold	Men's volleyball team: Bruno Rezende Éder Carbonera Felipe Fonteles Gustavo Endres Mário Pedreira Jr. Maurício Borges Maurício Souza Murilo Radke Renato Russomanno Thiago Alves Wallace de Souza Wallace Martins	(Mexico) 2011 Guadalajara	Volleyball	Men's tournament	29 Oct 2011	
Gold	Women's volleyball team: Dani Lins Fabiana Alvim Fabiana Claudino Fabíola de Souza Fernanda Garay Jaqueline Carvalho Jucely Barreto Marianne Steinbrecher Paula Pequeno Sheilla Castro Tandara Caixeta Thaísa Menezes	(Mexico) 2011 Guadalajara	Volleyball	Women's tournament	20 Oct 2011	
Bronze	Men's water polo team: Bernardo Rocha Danilo Corrêa Emilio Vieira Felipe Silva Henrique Carvalho Gabriel Rocha Gustavo Guimarães João Felipe Coelho Jonas Crivella Luis Capelache Marcelo das Chagas Marcelo Franco Ruda Franco	(Mexico) 2011 Guadalajara	Water polo	Men's tournament	29 Oct 2011	
Bronze	Women's water polo team: Amanda Oliveira Cecilia Canetti Cristina Beer Fernanda Lissoni Gabriela Gozani Gabriela Mantellato Izabella Chiappini Luíza Carvalho Manuela Canetti Marina Canetti Marina Zablith Mirella Coutinho Tess Oliveira	(Mexico) 2011 Guadalajara	Water polo	Women's tournament	28 Oct 2011	
Silver	Marcelo Giardi	(Mexico) 2011 Guadalajara	Water skiing	Men's wakeboard	22 Oct 2011	
Gold	Fernando Reis	(Mexico) 2011 Guadalajara	Weightlifting	Men's super heavyweight (+105 kg)	27 Oct 2011	
Bronze	Joice Silva	(Mexico) 2011 Guadalajara	Wrestling	Women's freestyle lightweight (-55 kg)	22 Oct 2011	
Silver	Aline Ferreira	(Mexico) 2011 Guadalajara	Wrestling	Women's freestyle heavyweight (-72 kg)	22 Oct 2011	
Bronze	Bernardo Oliveira; Daniel Xavier; Marcus Vinicius D'Almeida	(Canada) 2015 Toronto	Archery	Men's team	17 Jul 2015	
Silver	Aldemir da Silva Jr. Bruno Lins; Gustavo dos Santos; Vitor Hugo dos Santos	(Canada) 2015 Toronto	Athletics	Men's 4 × 100 m relay	25 Jul 2015	
Bronze	Caio Bonfim	(Canada) 2015 Toronto	Athletics	Men's 20 km walk	19 Jul 2015	
Silver	Ronald Julião	(Canada) 2015 Toronto	Athletics	Men's discus throw	23 Jul 2015	
Bronze	Júlio César de Oliveira	(Canada) 2015 Toronto	Athletics	Men's javelin throw	24 Jul 2015	
Bronze	Luiz Alberto de Araújo	(Canada) 2015 Toronto	Athletics	Men's decathlon	23 Jul 2015	
Bronze	Flávia de Lima	(Canada) 2015 Toronto	Athletics	Women's 800 m	22 Jul 2015	
Gold	Juliana Paula dos Santos	(Canada) 2015 Toronto	Athletics	Women's 5000 m	21 Jul 2015	
Gold	Adriana Aparecida da Silva	(Canada) 2015 Toronto	Athletics	Women's marathon	10 Sep 2015	(Note: Originally silver medalist, inherited the gold medal after the disqualification of the gold medalist Gladys Tejeda.)
Silver	Érica de Sena	(Canada) 2015 Toronto	Athletics	Women's 20 km walk	19 Jul 2015	
Silver	Fabiana Murer	(Canada) 2015 Toronto	Athletics	Women's pole vault	23 Jul 2015	
Silver	Keila Costa	(Canada) 2015 Toronto	Athletics	Women's triple jump	21 Jul 2015	
Bronze	Jucilene de Lima	(Canada) 2015 Toronto	Athletics	Women's javelin throw	21 Jul 2015	
Bronze	Vanessa Spínola	(Canada) 2015 Toronto	Athletics	Women's heptathlon	25 Jul 2015	
Silver	Daniel Paiola; Hugo Arthuso	(Canada) 2015 Toronto	Badminton	Men's doubles	15 Jul 2015	
Silver	Lohaynny Vicente; Luana Vicente	(Canada) 2015 Toronto	Badminton	Women's doubles	15 Jul 2015	
Bronze	Alex Yuwan Tjong; Lohaynny Vicente	(Canada) 2015 Toronto	Badminton	Mixed doubles	15 Jul 2015	
Gold	Men's basketball team: Augusto Lima Carlos Olivinha João Paulo Batista Larry Taylor Léonardo Meindl Marcus Vinicius Toledo Rafa Luz Rafael Mineiro Rafael Hettsheimeir Ricardo Fischer Vítor Benite	(Canada) 2015 Toronto	Basketball	Men's tournament	25 Jul 2015	
Gold	Marcelo Suartz	(Canada) 2015 Toronto	Bowling	Men's individual	25 Jul 2015	
Bronze	Joedison Teixeira	(Canada) 2015 Toronto	Boxing	Men's light welterweight (-64 kg)	22 Jul 2015	
Bronze	Rafael Lima	(Canada) 2015 Toronto	Boxing	Men's super heavyweight (+91 kg)	23 Jul 2015	
Gold	Isaquias Queiroz	(Canada) 2015 Toronto	Canoeing	Men's C-1 200 m	14 Jul 2015	
Gold	Isaquias Queiroz	(Canada) 2015 Toronto	Canoeing	Men's C-1 1000 m	13 Jul 2015	
Silver	Erlon Silva; Isaquias Queiroz	(Canada) 2015 Toronto	Canoeing	Men's C-2 1000 m	13 Jul 2015	
Silver	Edson Isaías	(Canada) 2015 Toronto	Canoeing	Men's K-1 200 m	14 Jul 2015	
Bronze	Edson Isaías; Hans Mallmann	(Canada) 2015 Toronto	Canoeing	Men's K-2 200 m	14 Jul 2015	
Bronze	Celso Oliveira; Vagner Souta	(Canada) 2015 Toronto	Canoeing	Men's K-2 1000 m	13 Jul 2015	
Silver	Celso Oliveira; Gilvan Ribeiro; Roberto Maehler; Vagner Souta	(Canada) 2015 Toronto	Canoeing	Men's K-4 1000 m	12 Jul 2015	
Bronze	Felipe Borges	(Canada) 2015 Toronto	Canoeing	Men's slalom C-1	19 Jul 2015	
Silver	Anderson Oliveira; Charles Corrêa	(Canada) 2015 Toronto	Canoeing	Men's slalom C-2	19 Jul 2015	
Silver	Pepe Gonçalves	(Canada) 2015 Toronto	Canoeing	Men's slalom K-1	19 Jul 2015	
Bronze	Valdenice Conceição	(Canada) 2015 Toronto	Canoeing	Women's C-1 200 m	14 Jul 2015	
Bronze	Ana Paula Vergutz	(Canada) 2015 Toronto	Canoeing	Women's K-1 500 m	13 Jul 2015	
Gold	Ana Sátila	(Canada) 2015 Toronto	Canoeing	Women's slalom C-1	19 Jul 2015	
Silver	Ana Sátila	(Canada) 2015 Toronto	Canoeing	Women's slalom K-1	19 Jul 2015	
Bronze	Gideoni Monteiro	(Canada) 2015 Toronto	Cycling	Men's omnium	17 Jul 2015	
Bronze	Flávio Cipriano; Hugo Osteti; Kacio Fonseca	(Canada) 2015 Toronto	Cycling	Men's sprint team	16 Jul 2015	
Silver	Giovanna Pedroso; Ingrid Oliveira	(Canada) 2015 Toronto	Diving	Women's synchronized 10 m platform	13 Jul 2015	
Bronze	Ruy Fonseca	(Canada) 2015 Toronto	Equestrian	Eventing	19 Jul 2015	
Bronze	João Oliva; João Paulo dos Santos; Leandro Aparecido da Silva; Sarah Waddell	(Canada) 2015 Toronto	Equestrian	Dressage team	12 Jul 2015	
Silver	Carlos Paro; Henrique Piombon; Márcio Jorge; Ruy Fonseca	(Canada) 2015 Toronto	Equestrian	Eventing team	19 Jul 2015	
Bronze	Ghislain Perrier	(Canada) 2015 Toronto	Fencing	Men's foil	22 Jul 2015	
Bronze	Renzo Agresta	(Canada) 2015 Toronto	Fencing	Men's sabre	20 Jul 2015	
Silver	Fernando Scavasin; Ghislain Perrier; Guilherme Toldo	(Canada) 2015 Toronto	Fencing	Men's foil team	25 Jul 2015	
Bronze	Nathalie Moellhausen	(Canada) 2015 Toronto	Fencing	Women's épée	21 Jul 2015	
Bronze	Amanda Simeão; Nathalie Moellhausen; Rayssa Costa	(Canada) 2015 Toronto	Fencing	Women's épée team	24 Jul 2015	
Bronze	Men's football team: Andrey Barreto Bressan Bruno Paulista Clayton Dodô Erik Euller Eurico Gilberto Gustavo Henrique Jacsson Luan Lucas Piazon Luciano Rômulo Tinga Vinícius Freitas	(Canada) 2015 Toronto	Football	Men's tournament	25 Jul 2015	
Gold	Women's football team: Andressa Alves Andressa Machry Bárbara Barbosa Cristiane Darlene de Souza Érika Cristiano Fabiana Simões Formiga Gabi Zanotti Géssica do Nascimento Luciana Dionizio Maurine Gonçalves Mônica Hickmann Poliana Medeiros Rafaelle Souza Raquel Fernandes Tamires de Britto Thaisa Moreno	(Canada) 2015 Toronto	Football	Women's tournament	25 Jul 2015	
Gold	Arthur Zanetti	(Canada) 2015 Toronto	Gymnastics	Artistic gymnastics men's rings	14 Jul 2015	
Bronze	Caio Souza	(Canada) 2015 Toronto	Gymnastics	Artistic gymnastics men's vault	15 Jul 2015	
Silver	Arthur Nory Mariano; Arthur Zanetti; Caio Souza; Francisco Barretto Jr. Lucas Bitencourt	(Canada) 2015 Toronto	Gymnastics	Artistic gymnastics men's all-around team	11 Jul 2015	
Bronze	Flávia Saraiva	(Canada) 2015 Toronto	Gymnastics	Artistic gymnastics women's all-around	13 Jul 2015	
Bronze	Daniele Hypólito; Flávia Saraiva; Julie Kim Sinmon; Letícia Costa; Lorrane Oliveira	(Canada) 2015 Toronto	Gymnastics	Artistic gymnastics women's all-around team	12 Jul 2015	
Bronze	Angélica Kvieczynski	(Canada) 2015 Toronto	Gymnastics	Rhythmic gymnastics individual hoop	19 Jul 2015	
Bronze	Angélica Kvieczynski	(Canada) 2015 Toronto	Gymnastics	Rhythmic gymnastics individual ribbon	19 Jul 2015	
Gold	Ana Paula Ribeiro; Beatriz Pomini; Dayane Amaral; Emanuelle Lima; Jessica Maier; Morgana Gmach	(Canada) 2015 Toronto	Gymnastics	Rhythmic gymnastics group all-around	18 Jul 2015	
Silver	Ana Paula Ribeiro; Beatriz Pomini; Dayane Amaral; Emanuelle Lima; Jessica Maier; Morgana Gmach	(Canada) 2015 Toronto	Gymnastics	Rhythmic gymnastics group hoops-clubs	20 Jul 2015	
Gold	Ana Paula Ribeiro; Beatriz Pomini; Dayane Amaral; Emanuelle Lima; Jessica Maier; Morgana Gmach	(Canada) 2015 Toronto	Gymnastics	Rhythmic gymnastics group ribbons	19 Jul 2015	
Gold	Men's handball team: Alexandro Pozzer André Soares Bruno Santana César Almeida Diogo Hubner Fábio Chiuffa Felipe Borges Fernando Pacheco Filho Henrique Teixeira Lucas Cândido Maik dos Santos Oswaldo Guimarães Raul Nantes Thiagus dos Santos Vinícius Teixeira	(Canada) 2015 Toronto	Handball	Men's tournament	25 Jul 2015	
Gold	Women's handball team: Alexandra do Nascimento Amanda de Andrade Ana Paula Belo Bárbara Arenhart Célia Coppi Daniela Piedade Deonise Fachinello Elaine Gomes Fernanda França Francielle da Rocha Jaqueline Anastácio Jéssica Quintino Mayssa Pessoa Samira Rocha Tamires Morena Lima	(Canada) 2015 Toronto	Handball	Women's tournament	24 Jul 2015	
Silver	Felipe Kitadai	(Canada) 2015 Toronto	Judo	Men's extra lightweight (-60 kg)	11 Jul 2015	
Gold	Charles Chibana	(Canada) 2015 Toronto	Judo	Men's half lightweight (-66 kg)	12 Jul 2015	
Bronze	Victor Penalber	(Canada) 2015 Toronto	Judo	Men's half middleweight (-81 kg)	13 Jul 2015	
Gold	Tiago Camilo	(Canada) 2015 Toronto	Judo	Men's middleweight (-90 kg)	13 Jul 2015	
Gold	Luciano Corrêa	(Canada) 2015 Toronto	Judo	Men's half heavyweight (-100 kg)	14 Jul 2015	
Gold	David Moura	(Canada) 2015 Toronto	Judo	Men's heavyweight (+100 kg)	14 Jul 2015	
Bronze	Nathalia Brigida	(Canada) 2015 Toronto	Judo	Women's extra lightweight (-48 kg)	11 Jul 2015	
Gold	Érika Miranda	(Canada) 2015 Toronto	Judo	Women's half lightweight (-52 kg)	11 Jul 2015	
Bronze	Rafaela Silva	(Canada) 2015 Toronto	Judo	Women's lightweight (-57 kg)	12 Jul 2015	
Bronze	Mariana Silva	(Canada) 2015 Toronto	Judo	Women's half middleweight (-63 kg)	13 Jul 2015	
Bronze	Maria Portela	(Canada) 2015 Toronto	Judo	Women's middleweight (-70 kg)	13 Jul 2015	
Silver	Mayra Aguiar	(Canada) 2015 Toronto	Judo	Women's half heavyweight (-78 kg)	14 Jul 2015	
Bronze	Maria Suelen Altheman	(Canada) 2015 Toronto	Judo	Women's heavyweight (+78 kg)	14 Jul 2015	
Gold	Douglas Brose	(Canada) 2015 Toronto	Karate	Men's kumite (-60 kg)	23 Jul 2015	
Bronze	Aline Souza	(Canada) 2015 Toronto	Karate	Women's kumite (-50 kg)	23 Jul 2015	
Gold	Valéria Kumizaki	(Canada) 2015 Toronto	Karate	Women's kumite (-55 kg)	23 Jul 2015	
Gold	Natália Brozulatto	(Canada) 2015 Toronto	Karate	Women's kumite (-68 kg)	25 Jul 2015	
Bronze	Isabela dos Santos	(Canada) 2015 Toronto	Karate	Women's kumite (+68 kg)	25 Jul 2015	
Gold	Yane Marques	(Canada) 2015 Toronto	Modern pentathlon	Women's individual	18 Jul 2015	
Gold	Marcel Stürmer	(Canada) 2015 Toronto	Roller sports	Artistic free skating men's	12 Jul 2015	
Silver	Talitha Hass	(Canada) 2015 Toronto	Roller sports	Artistic free skating women's	12 Jul 2015	
Silver	Fabiana Beltrame	(Canada) 2015 Toronto	Rowing	Women's lightweight single sculls	15 Jul 2015	
Bronze	Women's rugby sevens team: Angelica Pereira Gevaerd Beatriz Futuro Muhlbauer Bruna Lotufo Cláudia Lopes Teles Edna Santini Haline Leme Scatrut Isadora Cerullo Juliana Esteves dos Santos Maira Bravo Behrendt Mariana Barbosa Ramalho Paula Ishibashi Raquel Kochhann	(Canada) 2015 Toronto	Rugby sevens	Women's tournament	12 Jul 2015	
Silver	Robert Scheidt	(Canada) 2015 Toronto	Sailing	Men's Laser class	18 Jul 2015	
Gold	Ricardo Winicki	(Canada) 2015 Toronto	Sailing	Men's sailboard	18 Jul 2015	
Bronze	Cláudio Biekarck; Gunnar Ficker; Maria Hackerott	(Canada) 2015 Toronto	Sailing	Lightning class	19 Jul 2015	
Bronze	Fernanda Decnop	(Canada) 2015 Toronto	Sailing	Women's Laser Radial class	18 Jul 2015	
Gold	Patrícia Freitas	(Canada) 2015 Toronto	Sailing	Women's sailboard	18 Jul 2015	
Silver	Kahena Kunze; Martine Grael	(Canada) 2015 Toronto	Sailing	Women's 49er FX	18 Jul 2015	
Gold	Felipe Wu	(Canada) 2015 Toronto	Shooting	Men's 10 m air pistol	12 Jul 2015	
Silver	Emerson Duarte	(Canada) 2015 Toronto	Shooting	Men's 25 m rapid fire pistol	15 Jul 2015	
Gold	Júlio Almeida	(Canada) 2015 Toronto	Shooting	Men's 50 m pistol	17 Jul 2015	
Gold	Cassio Rippel	(Canada) 2015 Toronto	Shooting	Men's 50 m rifle prone	17 Jul 2015	
Silver	Bruno Fratus	(Canada) 2015 Toronto	Swimming	Men's 50 m freestyle	17 Jul 2015	
Silver	Guilherme Guido	(Canada) 2015 Toronto	Swimming	Men's 100 m backstroke	17 Jul 2015	
Gold	Felipe França	(Canada) 2015 Toronto	Swimming	Men's 100 m breaststroke	17 Jul 2015	
Silver	Felipe Lima	(Canada) 2015 Toronto	Swimming	Men's 100 m breaststroke	17 Jul 2015	
Bronze	Marcelo Chierighini	(Canada) 2015 Toronto	Swimming	Men's 100 m freestyle	14 Jul 2015	
Bronze	Leonardo de Deus	(Canada) 2015 Toronto	Swimming	Men's 200 m backstroke	15 Jul 2015	
Gold	Thiago Simon	(Canada) 2015 Toronto	Swimming	Men's 200 m breaststroke	15 Jul 2015	
Bronze	Thiago Pereira	(Canada) 2015 Toronto	Swimming	Men's 200 m breaststroke	15 Jul 2015	
Gold	Leonardo de Deus	(Canada) 2015 Toronto	Swimming	Men's 200 m butterfly	14 Jul 2015	
Gold	João de Lucca	(Canada) 2015 Toronto	Swimming	Men's 200 m freestyle	15 Jul 2015	
Gold	Henrique Rodrigues	(Canada) 2015 Toronto	Swimming	Men's 200 m medley	18 Jul 2015	
Silver	Thiago Pereira	(Canada) 2015 Toronto	Swimming	Men's 200 m medley	18 Jul 2015	
Bronze	Leonardo de Deus	(Canada) 2015 Toronto	Swimming	Men's 400 m freestyle	17 Jul 2015	
Gold	Brandonn Almeida	(Canada) 2015 Toronto	Swimming	Men's 400 m medley	16 Jul 2015	
Bronze	Brandonn Almeida	(Canada) 2015 Toronto	Swimming	Men's 1500 m freestyle	18 Jul 2015	
Gold	Bruno Fratus; João de Lucca; Marcelo Chierighini; Matheus Santana; Nicolas Oliveira (heats); Thiago Pereira (heats)	(Canada) 2015 Toronto	Swimming	Men's 4 × 100 m freestyle relay	14 Jul 2015	
Gold	Arthur Mendes; Felipe França; Guilherme Guido; Marcelo Chierighini; Felipe Lima (heats); Thiago Pereira (heats)	(Canada) 2015 Toronto	Swimming	Men's 4 × 100 m medley relay	18 Jul 2015	
Gold	João de Lucca; Luiz Altamir Melo; Nicolas Oliveira; Thiago Pereira; Henrique Rodrigues (heats); Kaio de Almeida (heats); Thiago Simon (heats)	(Canada) 2015 Toronto	Swimming	Men's 4 × 200 m freestyle relay	15 Jul 2015	
Silver	Etiene Medeiros	(Canada) 2015 Toronto	Swimming	Women's 50 m freestyle	17 Jul 2015	
Gold	Etiene Medeiros	(Canada) 2015 Toronto	Swimming	Women's 100 m backstroke	17 Jul 2015	
Bronze	Joanna Maranhão	(Canada) 2015 Toronto	Swimming	Women's 200 m butterfly	14 Jul 2015	
Bronze	Manuella Lyrio	(Canada) 2015 Toronto	Swimming	Women's 200 m freestyle	15 Jul 2015	
Bronze	Joanna Maranhão	(Canada) 2015 Toronto	Swimming	Women's 400 m medley	16 Jul 2015	
Bronze	Daynara de Paula; Etiene Medeiros; Graciele Herrmann; Larissa Oliveira; Daiane Oliveira (heats); Manuella Lyrio (heats)	(Canada) 2015 Toronto	Swimming	Women's 4 × 100 m freestyle relay	14 Jul 2015	
Bronze	Daynara de Paula; Etiene Medeiros; Jhennifer Conceição; Larissa Oliveira; Beatriz Travalon (heats); Natalia de Luccas (heats)	(Canada) 2015 Toronto	Swimming	Women's 4 × 100 m medley relay	18 Jul 2015	
Silver	Jéssica Cavalheiro; Joanna Maranhão; Larissa Oliveira; Manuella Lyrio; Bruna Primati (heats); Gabrielle Roncatto (heats)	(Canada) 2015 Toronto	Swimming	Women's 4 × 200 m freestyle relay	16 Jul 2015	
Gold	Hugo Calderano	(Canada) 2015 Toronto	Table tennis	Men's singles	25 Jul 2015	
Silver	Gustavo Tsuboi	(Canada) 2015 Toronto	Table tennis	Men's singles	25 Jul 2015	
Bronze	Thiago Monteiro	(Canada) 2015 Toronto	Table tennis	Men's singles	25 Jul 2015	
Gold	Gustavo Tsuboi; Hugo Calderano; Thiago Monteiro	(Canada) 2015 Toronto	Table tennis	Men's team	21 Jul 2015	
Silver	Gui Lin	(Canada) 2015 Toronto	Table tennis	Women's singles	25 Jul 2015	
Bronze	Caroline Kumahara	(Canada) 2015 Toronto	Table tennis	Women's singles	25 Jul 2015	
Silver	Caroline Kumahara; Gui Lin; Lígia Silva	(Canada) 2015 Toronto	Table tennis	Women's team	21 Jul 2015	
Bronze	Iris Sing	(Canada) 2015 Toronto	Taekwondo	Women's flyweight (-49 kg)	19 Jul 2015	
Bronze	Raphaella Galacho	(Canada) 2015 Toronto	Taekwondo	Women's heavyweight (+67 kg)	22 Jul 2015	
Silver	Álvaro Morais Filho; Vitor Felipe	(Canada) 2015 Toronto	Beach volleyball	Men's tournament	21 Jul 2015	
Bronze	Carolina Horta; Liliane Maestrini	(Canada) 2015 Toronto	Beach volleyball	Women's tournament	21 Jul 2015	
Silver	Men's volleyball team: Carlos Eduardo Barreto Douglas Souza Flávio Gualberto João Rafael Ferreira Maurício Borges Maurício Souza Murilo Radke Otávio Pinto Rafael Araújo Renan Buiatti Thiago Veloso Tiago Brendle	(Canada) 2015 Toronto	Volleyball	Men's tournament	26 Jul 2015	
Silver	Women's volleyball team: Adenízia da Silva Ana Tiemi Angélica Malinverno Bárbara Bruch Camila Brait Fernanda Garay Jaqueline Carvalho Joyce da Silva Macris Carneiro Mariana Costa Michelle Pavão Rosamaria Montibeller	(Canada) 2015 Toronto	Volleyball	Women's tournament	25 Jul 2015	
Silver	Men's water polo team: Adrià Delgado Bernardo Gomes Bernardo Rocha Felipe Perrone Felipe Silva Guilherme Gomes Gustavo Guimarães Ives González Jonas Crivella Josip Vrlić Paulo Salemi Thyê Bezerra Vinicius Antonelli	(Canada) 2015 Toronto	Water polo	Men's tournament	15 Jul 2015	
Bronze	Women's water polo team: Amanda Oliveira Diana Abla Gabriela Mantellato Izabella Chiappini Lucianne Maia Luíza Carvalho Marina Canetti Marina Zablith Melani Dias Mirella Coutinho Tess Oliveira Victória Chamorro Viviane Bahia	(Canada) 2015 Toronto	Water polo	Women's tournament	14 Jul 2015	
Silver	Mateus Gregório Machado	(Canada) 2015 Toronto	Weightlifting	Men's heavyweight (-105 kg)	15 Jul 2015	
Gold	Fernando Reis	(Canada) 2015 Toronto	Weightlifting	Men's super heavyweight (+105 kg)	15 Jul 2015	
Bronze	Bruna Piloto	(Canada) 2015 Toronto	Weightlifting	Women's middleweight (-63 kg)	12 Jul 2015	
Bronze	Jaqueline Ferreira	(Canada) 2015 Toronto	Weightlifting	Women's heavyweight (-75 kg)	14 Jul 2015	
Bronze	Davi Albino	(Canada) 2015 Toronto	Wrestling	Men's Greco-Roman heavyweight (-98 kg)	16 Jul 2015	
Gold	Joice Silva	(Canada) 2015 Toronto	Wrestling	Women's freestyle lightweight (-58 kg)	16 Jul 2015	
Bronze	Aline Ferreira	(Canada) 2015 Toronto	Wrestling	Women's freestyle heavyweight (-75 kg)	17 Jul 2015	
Silver	Marcus Vinicius D'Almeida	(Peru) 2019 Lima	Archery	Men's individual recurve	11 Aug 2019	
Silver	Paulo André de Oliveira	(Peru) 2019 Lima	Athletics	Men's 100 m	7 Aug 2019	
Bronze	Eduardo de Deus Jr.	(Peru) 2019 Lima	Athletics	Men's 110 m hurdles	10 Aug 2019	
Gold	Alison dos Santos	(Peru) 2019 Lima	Athletics	Men's 400 m hurdles	8 Aug 2019	
Gold	Altobeli da Silva	(Peru) 2019 Lima	Athletics	Men's 3000 m steeplechase	10 Aug 2019	
Silver	Altobeli da Silva	(Peru) 2019 Lima	Athletics	Men's 5000 m	6 Aug 2019	
Gold	Ederson Pereira	(Peru) 2019 Lima	Athletics	Men's 10,000 m	9 Aug 2019	
Gold	Derick Silva; Jorge Vides; Paulo André de Oliveira; Rodrigo do Nascimento	(Peru) 2019 Lima	Athletics	Men's 4 × 100 m relay	9 Aug 2019	
Silver	Caio Bonfim	(Peru) 2019 Lima	Athletics	Men's 20 km walk	4 Aug 2019	
Silver	Augusto Dutra	(Peru) 2019 Lima	Athletics	Men's pole vault	10 Aug 2019	
Gold	Darlan Romani	(Peru) 2019 Lima	Athletics	Men's shot put	7 Aug 2019	
Bronze	Vitória Cristina Rosa	(Peru) 2019 Lima	Athletics	Women's 100 m	7 Aug 2019	
Silver	Vitória Cristina Rosa	(Peru) 2019 Lima	Athletics	Women's 200 m	9 Aug 2019	
Gold	Andressa Fidelis; Lorraine Martins; Rosângela Santos; Vitória Cristina Rosa	(Peru) 2019 Lima	Athletics	Women's 4 × 100 m relay	9 Aug 2019	
Bronze	Érica de Sena	(Peru) 2019 Lima	Athletics	Women's 20 km walk	4 Aug 2019	
Silver	Fernanda Raquel Martins	(Peru) 2019 Lima	Athletics	Women's discus throw	6 Mar 2020	(Note: Originally bronze medalist, inherited the silver medal after the disqualification of the silver medalist Andressa de Morais.)
Gold	Ygor Coelho	(Peru) 2019 Lima	Badminton	Men's singles	2 Aug 2019	
Bronze	Fabrício Farias; Franciélton Farias	(Peru) 2019 Lima	Badminton	Men's doubles	1 Aug 2019	
Bronze	Fabiana Silva; Tamires dos Santos	(Peru) 2019 Lima	Badminton	Women's doubles	1 Aug 2019	
Bronze	Jaqueline Lima; Sâmia Lima	(Peru) 2019 Lima	Badminton	Women's doubles	1 Aug 2019	
Bronze	Fabrício Farias; Jaqueline Lima	(Peru) 2019 Lima	Badminton	Mixed doubles	1 Aug 2019	
Gold	Women's basketball team: Aline Cezário Clarissa dos Santos Débora Costa Érika de Souza Isabela Lyra Izabella Sangalli Lays da Silva Patrícia Teixeira Raphaella Monteiro Stephanie Soares Tainá Paixão Tatiane Pacheco	(Peru) 2019 Lima	Basketball	Women's tournament	10 Aug 2019	
Bronze	Filipe Otheguy	(Peru) 2019 Lima	Basque pelota	Men's individual hand fronton	9 Aug 2019	
Silver	Marcelo Suartz	(Peru) 2019 Lima	Bowling	Men's individual	30 Jul 2019	
Silver	Hebert Conceição	(Peru) 2019 Lima	Boxing	Men's middleweight (-75 kg)	2 Aug 2019	
Silver	Keno Machado	(Peru) 2019 Lima	Boxing	Men's light heavyweight (-81 kg)	1 Aug 2019	
Bronze	Abner Teixeira	(Peru) 2019 Lima	Boxing	Men's heavyweight (-91 kg)	30 Jul 2019	
Silver	Jucielen Romeu	(Peru) 2019 Lima	Boxing	Women's featherweight (-57 kg)	1 Aug 2019	
Gold	Beatriz Ferreira	(Peru) 2019 Lima	Boxing	Women's lightweight (-60 kg)	2 Aug 2019	
Bronze	Flávia Figueiredo	(Peru) 2019 Lima	Boxing	Women's middleweight (-75 kg)	30 Jul 2019	
Gold	Isaquias Queiroz	(Peru) 2019 Lima	Canoeing	Men's C-1 1000 m	29 Jul 2019	
Bronze	Vagner Souta	(Peru) 2019 Lima	Canoeing	Men's K-1 1000 m	29 Jul 2019	
Bronze	Felipe Borges	(Peru) 2019 Lima	Canoeing	Men's slalom C-1	4 Aug 2019	
Gold	Pepe Gonçalves	(Peru) 2019 Lima	Canoeing	Men's slalom K-1	4 Aug 2019	
Gold	Pepe Gonçalves	(Peru) 2019 Lima	Canoeing	Men's slalom K-1 cross	4 Aug 2019	
Bronze	Ana Paula Vergutz	(Peru) 2019 Lima	Canoeing	Women's K-1 500 m	29 Jul 2019	
Gold	Ana Sátila	(Peru) 2019 Lima	Canoeing	Women's slalom C-1	4 Aug 2019	
Gold	Ana Sátila	(Peru) 2019 Lima	Canoeing	Women's slalom K-1 cross	4 Aug 2019	
Silver	Anderson Ezequiel	(Peru) 2019 Lima	Cycling	Men's BMX racing	9 Aug 2019	
Silver	Henrique Avancini	(Peru) 2019 Lima	Cycling	Men's mountain bike	28 Jul 2019	
Silver	Magno Nazaret	(Peru) 2019 Lima	Cycling	Men's time trial (road)	7 Aug 2019	
Silver	Paola Reis	(Peru) 2019 Lima	Cycling	Women's BMX racing	9 Aug 2019	
Bronze	Jaqueline Mourão	(Peru) 2019 Lima	Cycling	Women's mountain bike	28 Jul 2019	
Bronze	Isaac Souza; Kawan Pereira	(Peru) 2019 Lima	Diving	Men's synchronized 10 m platform	2 Aug 2019	
Bronze	Carlos Paro	(Peru) 2019 Lima	Equestrian	Eventing	4 Aug 2019	
Gold	Marlon Zanotelli	(Peru) 2019 Lima	Equestrian	Jumping	9 Aug 2019	
Bronze	João Oliva; João Paulo dos Santos; Leandro Aparecido da Silva; Pedro de Almeida	(Peru) 2019 Lima	Equestrian	Dressage team	29 Jul 2019	
Silver	Carlos Paro; Marcelo Tosi; Rafael Losano; Ruy Fonseca	(Peru) 2019 Lima	Equestrian	Eventing team	4 Aug 2019	
Gold	Eduardo Menezes; Marlon Zanotelli; Pedro Veniss; Rodrigo Lambre	(Peru) 2019 Lima	Equestrian	Jumping team	9 Aug 2019	
Silver	Guilherme Toldo; Heitor Shimbo; Henrique Marques	(Peru) 2019 Lima	Fencing	Men's foil team	9 Aug 2019	
Bronze	Nathalie Moellhausen	(Peru) 2019 Lima	Fencing	Women's épée	7 Aug 2019	
Bronze	Beatriz Bulcão	(Peru) 2019 Lima	Fencing	Women's foil	5 Aug 2019	
Gold	Caio Souza	(Peru) 2019 Lima	Gymnastics	Artistic gymnastics men's all-around	29 Jul 2019	
Silver	Arthur Nory Mariano	(Peru) 2019 Lima	Gymnastics	Artistic gymnastics men's all-around	29 Jul 2019	
Gold	Francisco Barretto Jr.	(Peru) 2019 Lima	Gymnastics	Artistic gymnastics men's horizontal bar	31 Jul 2019	
Silver	Arthur Nory Mariano	(Peru) 2019 Lima	Gymnastics	Artistic gymnastics men's horizontal bar	31 Jul 2019	
Silver	Caio Souza	(Peru) 2019 Lima	Gymnastics	Artistic gymnastics men's parallel bars	31 Jul 2019	
Gold	Francisco Barretto Jr.	(Peru) 2019 Lima	Gymnastics	Artistic gymnastics men's pommel horse	30 Jul 2019	
Silver	Arthur Zanetti	(Peru) 2019 Lima	Gymnastics	Artistic gymnastics men's rings	30 Jul 2019	
Gold	Arthur Nory Mariano; Arthur Zanetti; Caio Souza; Francisco Barretto Jr. Luís Guilherme Porto	(Peru) 2019 Lima	Gymnastics	Artistic gymnastics men's all-around team	28 Jul 2019	
Bronze	Flávia Saraiva	(Peru) 2019 Lima	Gymnastics	Artistic gymnastics women's all-around	29 Jul 2019	
Bronze	Flávia Saraiva	(Peru) 2019 Lima	Gymnastics	Artistic gymnastics women's floor exercise	31 Jul 2019	
Bronze	Carolyne Pedro; Flávia Saraiva; Jade Barbosa; Lorrane Oliveira; Thaís Fidélis	(Peru) 2019 Lima	Gymnastics	Artistic gymnastics women's all-around team	27 Jul 2019	
Bronze	Natália Gaudio	(Peru) 2019 Lima	Gymnastics	Rhythmic gymnastics individual all-around	3 Aug 2019	
Silver	Bárbara Domingos	(Peru) 2019 Lima	Gymnastics	Rhythmic gymnastics individual ribbon	5 Aug 2019	
Bronze	Beatriz Linhares; Camila Rossi; Déborah Medrado; Nicole Pircio; Vitoria Guerra	(Peru) 2019 Lima	Gymnastics	Rhythmic gymnastics group all-around	3 Aug 2019	
Bronze	Beatriz Linhares; Camila Rossi; Déborah Medrado; Nicole Pircio; Vitoria Guerra	(Peru) 2019 Lima	Gymnastics	Rhythmic gymnastics group balls	4 Aug 2019	
Gold	Beatriz Linhares; Camila Rossi; Déborah Medrado; Nicole Pircio; Vitoria Guerra	(Peru) 2019 Lima	Gymnastics	Rhythmic gymnastics group hoops-clubs	5 Aug 2019	
Bronze	Men's handball team: Alexandro Pozzer César Almeida Fábio Chiuffa Felipe Borges Haniel Langaro Henrique Teixeira João Pedro Silva Leonardo Terçariol Oswaldo Guimarães Raul Nantes Rogério Moraes Ferreira Rudolph Hackbarth Thiagus dos Santos Thiago Ponciano	(Peru) 2019 Lima	Handball	Men's tournament	5 Aug 2019	
Gold	Women's handball team: Adriana Castro Ana Paula Belo Bárbara Arenhart Bruna de Paula Deonise Fachinello Eduarda Amorim Elaine Gomes Jaqueline Anastácio Larissa Araújo Mariana Costa Patrícia Matieli Renata Arruda Samara Vieira Tamires Morena Lima	(Peru) 2019 Lima	Handball	Women's tournament	30 Jul 2019	
Gold	Renan Torres	(Peru) 2019 Lima	Judo	Men's extra lightweight (-60 kg)	8 Aug 2019	
Silver	Daniel Cargnin	(Peru) 2019 Lima	Judo	Men's half lightweight (-66 kg)	9 Aug 2019	
Bronze	Jeferson Santos Jr.	(Peru) 2019 Lima	Judo	Men's lightweight (-73 kg)	8 Aug 2019	
Gold	Eduardo Yudy Santos	(Peru) 2019 Lima	Judo	Men's half middleweight (-81 kg)	10 Aug 2019	
Bronze	David Moura	(Peru) 2019 Lima	Judo	Men's heavyweight (+100 kg)	11 Aug 2019	
Gold	Larissa Pimenta	(Peru) 2019 Lima	Judo	Women's half lightweight (-52 kg)	8 Aug 2019	
Bronze	Alexia Castilhos	(Peru) 2019 Lima	Judo	Women's half middleweight (-63 kg)	10 Aug 2019	
Gold	Mayra Aguiar	(Peru) 2019 Lima	Judo	Women's half heavyweight (-78 kg)	11 Aug 2019	
Bronze	Beatriz Souza	(Peru) 2019 Lima	Judo	Women's heavyweight (+78 kg)	11 Aug 2019	
Bronze	Guilherme Silva; Lucas Santos; Victor Mota	(Peru) 2019 Lima	Karate	Men's kata team	9 Aug 2019	
Silver	Douglas Brose	(Peru) 2019 Lima	Karate	Men's kumite (-60 kg)	11 Aug 2019	
Bronze	Vinícius Figueira	(Peru) 2019 Lima	Karate	Men's kumite (-67 kg)	11 Aug 2019	
Silver	Hernani Veríssimo	(Peru) 2019 Lima	Karate	Men's kumite (-75 kg)	11 Aug 2019	
Bronze	Carolaine Pereira; Izabel Cardoso; Sabrina Pereira	(Peru) 2019 Lima	Karate	Women's kata team	9 Aug 2019	
Bronze	Jéssica de Paula	(Peru) 2019 Lima	Karate	Women's kumite (-50 kg)	10 Aug 2019	
Gold	Valéria Kumizaki	(Peru) 2019 Lima	Karate	Women's kumite (-55 kg)	10 Aug 2019	
Bronze	Isabela Abreu; Priscila Oliveira	(Peru) 2019 Lima	Modern pentathlon	Women's relay	29 Jul 2019	
Bronze	Gustavo Casado	(Peru) 2019 Lima	Roller sports	Artistic free skating men's	27 Jul 2019	
Gold	Bruna Wurts	(Peru) 2019 Lima	Roller sports	Artistic free skating women's	27 Jul 2019	
Bronze	Lucas Verthein; Uncas Batista	(Peru) 2019 Lima	Rowing	Men's double sculls	8 Aug 2019	
Silver	Pau Vela; Xavier Vela	(Peru) 2019 Lima	Rowing	Men's coxless pair-oared shells	9 Aug 2019	
Bronze	Alef Fontoura; Fábio Moreira; Gabriel Campos; Willian Giaretton	(Peru) 2019 Lima	Rowing	Men's coxless four-oared shells	8 Aug 2019	
Silver	Bruno Fontes	(Peru) 2019 Lima	Sailing	Men's Laser class	9 Aug 2019	
Gold	Gabriel Borges; Marco Grael	(Peru) 2019 Lima	Sailing	Men's 49er class	9 Aug 2019	
Gold	Bruno Lobo	(Peru) 2019 Lima	Sailing	Kites	10 Aug 2019	
Gold	Matheus Dellagnello	(Peru) 2019 Lima	Sailing	Sunfish class	10 Aug 2019	
Bronze	Gabriela Nicolino; Samuel Albrecht	(Peru) 2019 Lima	Sailing	Nacra 17 class	9 Aug 2019	
Bronze	Juliana Duque; Rafael Martins	(Peru) 2019 Lima	Sailing	Snipe class	10 Aug 2019	
Silver	Cláudio Biekarck; Gunnar Ficker; Isabel Ficker	(Peru) 2019 Lima	Sailing	Lightning class	10 Aug 2019	
Gold	Patrícia Freitas	(Peru) 2019 Lima	Sailing	Women's sailboard	9 Aug 2019	
Gold	Kahena Kunze; Martine Grael	(Peru) 2019 Lima	Sailing	Women's 49er FX	10 Aug 2019	
Bronze	Júlio Almeida	(Peru) 2019 Lima	Shooting	Men's 10 m air pistol	28 Jul 2019	
Bronze	Roberto Schmits	(Peru) 2019 Lima	Shooting	Men's trap	30 Jul 2019	
Silver	Vinnicius Martins	(Peru) 2019 Lima	Surfing	Men's SUP race	2 Aug 2019	
Gold	Lena Guimarães	(Peru) 2019 Lima	Surfing	Women's SUP race	2 Aug 2019	
Bronze	Nicole Pacelli	(Peru) 2019 Lima	Surfing	Women's SUP surf	4 Aug 2019	
Gold	Chloé Calmon	(Peru) 2019 Lima	Surfing	Women's longboard	4 Aug 2019	
Gold	Bruno Fratus	(Peru) 2019 Lima	Swimming	Men's 50 m freestyle	9 Aug 2019	
Silver	Guilherme Guido	(Peru) 2019 Lima	Swimming	Men's 100 m backstroke	8 Aug 2019	
Gold	João Gomes Jr.	(Peru) 2019 Lima	Swimming	Men's 100 m breaststroke	6 Aug 2019	
Bronze	Vinicius Lanza	(Peru) 2019 Lima	Swimming	Men's 100 m breaststroke	7 Aug 2019	
Gold	Marcelo Chierighini	(Peru) 2019 Lima	Swimming	Men's 100 m freestyle	8 Aug 2019	
Bronze	Leonardo de Deus	(Peru) 2019 Lima	Swimming	Men's 200 m backstroke	7 Aug 2019	
Gold	Leonardo de Deus	(Peru) 2019 Lima	Swimming	Men's 200 m butterfly	6 Aug 2019	
Gold	Fernando Scheffer	(Peru) 2019 Lima	Swimming	Men's 200 m freestyle	7 Aug 2019	
Silver	Breno Correia	(Peru) 2019 Lima	Swimming	Men's 200 m freestyle	7 Aug 2019	
Silver	Caio Pumputis	(Peru) 2019 Lima	Swimming	Men's 200 m medley	10 Aug 2019	
Bronze	Leonardo Coelho Santos	(Peru) 2019 Lima	Swimming	Men's 200 m medley	10 Aug 2019	
Silver	Fernando Scheffer	(Peru) 2019 Lima	Swimming	Men's 400 m freestyle	6 Aug 2019	
Bronze	Luiz Altamir Melo	(Peru) 2019 Lima	Swimming	Men's 400 m freestyle	6 Aug 2019	
Silver	Leonardo Coelho Santos	(Peru) 2019 Lima	Swimming	Men's 400 m medley	9 Aug 2019	
Bronze	Brandonn Almeida	(Peru) 2019 Lima	Swimming	Men's 400 m medley	9 Aug 2019	
Silver	Miguel Valente	(Peru) 2019 Lima	Swimming	Men's 800 m freestyle	8 Aug 2019	
Gold	Guilherme Costa	(Peru) 2019 Lima	Swimming	Men's 800 m freestyle	8 Aug 2019	
Gold	Breno Correia; Bruno Fratus; Marcelo Chierighini; Pedro Spajari	(Peru) 2019 Lima	Swimming	Men's 4 × 100 m freestyle relay	6 Aug 2019	
Silver	Guilherme Guido; João Gomes Jr. Marcelo Chierighini; Vinicius Lanza; Breno Correia (heats); Felipe Lima (heats); Leonardo de Deus (heats); Luiz Altamir Melo (heats)	(Peru) 2019 Lima	Swimming	Men's 4 × 100 m medley relay	10 Aug 2019	
Gold	Breno Correia; Fernando Scheffer; João de Lucca; Luiz Altamir Melo	(Peru) 2019 Lima	Swimming	Men's 4 × 200 m freestyle relay	9 Aug 2019	
Bronze	Victor Colonese	(Peru) 2019 Lima	Swimming	Men's marathon 10 km	1 Jul 2020	(Note: Originally ranked fourth, inherited the bronze medal after the disqualification of the silver medalist Guillerme Bertola.)
Gold	Etiene Medeiros	(Peru) 2019 Lima	Swimming	Women's 50 m freestyle	9 Aug 2019	
Bronze	Etiene Medeiros	(Peru) 2019 Lima	Swimming	Women's 100 m backstroke	8 Aug 2019	
Bronze	Larissa Oliveira	(Peru) 2019 Lima	Swimming	Women's 100 m freestyle	8 Aug 2019	
Bronze	Larissa Oliveira	(Peru) 2019 Lima	Swimming	Women's 200 m freestyle	7 Aug 2019	
Bronze	Viviane Jungblut	(Peru) 2019 Lima	Swimming	Women's 800 m freestyle	8 Aug 2019	
Silver	Daynara de Paula; Etiene Medeiros; Larissa Oliveira; Manuella Lyrio	(Peru) 2019 Lima	Swimming	Women's 4 × 100 m freestyle relay	6 Aug 2019	
Bronze	Etiene Medeiros; Jhennifer Conceição; Giovanna Diamante; Larissa Oliveira; Daynara de Paula (heats); Fernanda de Goeij (heats); Manuella Lyrio (heats); Pâmela de Souza (heats)	(Peru) 2019 Lima	Swimming	Women's 4 × 100 m medley relay	10 Aug 2019	
Bronze	Aline Rodrigues; Gabrielle Roncatto; Larissa Oliveira; Manuella Lyrio	(Peru) 2019 Lima	Swimming	Women's 4 × 200 m freestyle relay	9 Aug 2019	
Gold	Ana Marcela Cunha	(Peru) 2019 Lima	Swimming	Women's marathon 10 km	4 Aug 2019	
Bronze	Viviane Jungblut	(Peru) 2019 Lima	Swimming	Women's marathon 10 km	4 Aug 2019	
Silver	Breno Correia; Etiene Medeiros; Larissa Oliveira; Marcelo Chierighini; Camila Mello (heats); João de Lucca (heats); Lorrane Ferreira (heats); Pedro Spajari (heats)	(Peru) 2019 Lima	Swimming	Mixed 4 × 100 m freestyle relay	7 Aug 2019	
Gold	Giovanna Diamante; Guilherme Guido; João Gomes Jr. Larissa Oliveira; Jhennifer Conceição (heats); Leonardo de Deus (heats); Manuella Lyrio (heats); Vinicius Lanza (heats)	(Peru) 2019 Lima	Swimming	Mixed 4 × 100 m medley relay	8 Aug 2019	
Gold	Hugo Calderano	(Peru) 2019 Lima	Table tennis	Men's singles	7 Aug 2019	
Gold	Gustavo Tsuboi; Hugo Calderano	(Peru) 2019 Lima	Table tennis	Men's doubles	6 Aug 2019	
Bronze	Eric Jouti; Gustavo Tsuboi; Hugo Calderano	(Peru) 2019 Lima	Table tennis	Men's team	10 Aug 2019	
Bronze	Bruna Takahashi	(Peru) 2019 Lima	Table tennis	Women's singles	7 Aug 2019	
Bronze	Bruna Takahashi; Jéssica Yamada	(Peru) 2019 Lima	Table tennis	Women's doubles	5 Aug 2019	
Silver	Bruna Takahashi; Caroline Kumahara; Jéssica Yamada	(Peru) 2019 Lima	Table tennis	Women's team	10 Aug 2019	
Silver	Bruna Takahashi; Gustavo Tsuboi	(Peru) 2019 Lima	Table tennis	Mixed doubles	5 Aug 2019	
Bronze	Paulo Ricardo Melo	(Peru) 2019 Lima	Taekwondo	Men's flyweight (-58 kg)	27 Jul 2019	
Gold	Edival Pontes	(Peru) 2019 Lima	Taekwondo	Men's featherweight (-68 kg)	28 Jul 2019	
Silver	Ícaro Miguel Soares	(Peru) 2019 Lima	Taekwondo	Men's middleweight (-80 kg)	29 Jul 2019	
Bronze	Maicon Andrade	(Peru) 2019 Lima	Taekwondo	Men's heavyweight (+80 kg)	29 Jul 2019	
Silver	Talisca Reis	(Peru) 2019 Lima	Taekwondo	Women's flyweight (-49 kg)	27 Jul 2019	
Gold	Milena Titoneli	(Peru) 2019 Lima	Taekwondo	Women's middleweight (-67 kg)	29 Jul 2019	
Bronze	Raiany Fidelis	(Peru) 2019 Lima	Taekwondo	Women's heavyweight (+67 kg)	29 Jul 2019	
Gold	João Menezes	(Peru) 2019 Lima	Tennis	Men's singles	4 Aug 2019	
Bronze	Carolina Alves; Luisa Stefani	(Peru) 2019 Lima	Tennis	Women's doubles	3 Aug 2019	
Silver	Manoel Messias	(Peru) 2019 Lima	Triathlon	Men's individual	27 Jul 2019	
Gold	Luisa Baptista	(Peru) 2019 Lima	Triathlon	Women's individual	27 Jul 2019	
Silver	Vittória Lopes	(Peru) 2019 Lima	Triathlon	Women's individual	27 Jul 2019	
Gold	Kaue Willy; Luisa Baptista; Manoel Messias; Vittória Lopes	(Peru) 2019 Lima	Triathlon	Mixed relay	29 Jul 2019	
Bronze	Ângela Lavalle; Carolina Horta	(Peru) 2019 Lima	Beach volleyball	Women's tournament	27 Jul 2019	
Bronze	Men's volleyball team: Aboubacar Neto Carlos Eduardo Barreto Cledenílson Batista Éder Carbonera Eduardo Carísio Felipe Roque Henrique Honorato Lucas Lóh Matheus Santos Rodrigo Leão Rogério Filho Thiago Veloso	(Peru) 2019 Lima	Volleyball	Men's tournament	4 Aug 2019	
Bronze	Men's water polo team: Bernardo Rocha Guilherme Almeida Gustavo Coutinho Gustavo Guimarães Logan Cabral Luís Ricardo Silva Pedro Real Rafael Real Roberto Freitas Ruda Franco Slobodan Soro	(Peru) 2019 Lima	Water polo	Men's tournament	10 Aug 2019	
Bronze	Women's water polo team: Ana Alice Amaral Ana Beatriz Mantellato Ana Júlia Amaral Diana Abla Gabriela Mantellato Letícia Belório Mariana Duarte Mirella Coutinho Samantha Ferreira Victória Chamorro Viviane Bahia	(Peru) 2019 Lima	Water polo	Women's tournament	10 Aug 2019	
Bronze	Mariana Nep Ribeiro	(Peru) 2019 Lima	Water skiing	Women's wakeboard	29 Jul 2019	
Gold	Fernando Reis	(Peru) 2019 Lima	Weightlifting	Men's super heavyweight (+109 kg)	30 Jul 2019	
Bronze	Giullia Penalber	(Peru) 2019 Lima	Wrestling	Women's freestyle lightweight (-57 kg)	8 Aug 2019	
Bronze	Laís Nunes	(Peru) 2019 Lima	Wrestling	Women's freestyle middleweight (-62 kg)	9 Aug 2019	
Silver	Aline Ferreira	(Peru) 2019 Lima	Wrestling	Women's freestyle heavyweight (-76 kg)	9 Aug 2019	
Bronze	Marcus Vinicius D'Almeida; Matheus Gomes; Matheus Ely	(Chile) 2023 Santiago	Archery	Men's team recurve	4 Nov 2023	
Silver	Ana Clara Machado	(Chile) 2023 Santiago	Archery	Women's individual recurve	5 Nov 2023	
Silver	Ana Clara Machado; Marcus Vinicius D'Almeida	(Chile) 2023 Santiago	Archery	Mixed team recurve	5 Nov 2023	
Bronze	Laura Miccuci; Gabriela Regly	(Chile) 2023 Santiago	Artistic swimming	Duet	2 Nov 2023	
Gold	Rodrigo do Nascimento; Felipe Bardi; Erik Cardoso; Renan Correa	(Chile) 2023 Santiago	Athletics	Men's 4 × 100 m relay	2 Nov 2023	
Gold	Lucas Carvalho; Matheus Lima; Douglas Hernandes; Lucas Conceição	(Chile) 2023 Santiago	Athletics	Men's 4 × 400 m relay	4 Nov 2023	
Silver	Felipe Bardi	(Chile) 2023 Santiago	Athletics	Men's 100 m	31 Oct 2023	
Gold	Renan Correa	(Chile) 2023 Santiago	Athletics	Men's 200 m	2 Nov 2023	
Gold	Lucas Conceição	(Chile) 2023 Santiago	Athletics	Men's 400 m	1 Nov 2023	
Bronze	Altobeli da Silva	(Chile) 2023 Santiago	Athletics	Men's 5000 m	31 Oct 2023	
Gold	Eduardo de Deus Jr.	(Chile) 2023 Santiago	Athletics	Men's 110 m hurdles	1 Nov 2023	
Bronze	Rafael Pereira	(Chile) 2023 Santiago	Athletics	Men's 110 m hurdles	1 Nov 2023	
Silver	Matheus Lima	(Chile) 2023 Santiago	Athletics	Men's 400 m hurdles	3 Nov 2023	
Silver	Caio Bonfim	(Chile) 2023 Santiago	Athletics	Men's 20 km walk	29 Oct 2023	
Silver	Almir dos Santos	(Chile) 2023 Santiago	Athletics	Men's triple jump	3 Nov 2023	
Gold	Darlan Romani	(Chile) 2023 Santiago	Athletics	Men's shot put	3 Nov 2023	
Silver	Pedro Henrique Rodrigues	(Chile) 2023 Santiago	Athletics	Men's javelin throw	4 Nov 2023	
Silver	José Fernando Ferreira	(Chile) 2023 Santiago	Athletics	Men's decathlon	31 Oct 2023	
Bronze	Anny de Bassi; Letícia Nonato; Jainy dos Santos; Tiffani Marinho	(Chile) 2023 Santiago	Athletics	Women's 4 × 400 m relay	4 Nov 2023	
Bronze	Ana Azevedo	(Chile) 2023 Santiago	Athletics	Women's 200 m	2 Nov 2023	
Silver	Ewellyn Santos	(Chile) 2023 Santiago	Athletics	Women's 400 m hurdles	3 Nov 2023	
Bronze	Tatiane da Silva	(Chile) 2023 Santiago	Athletics	Women's 3000 m steeplechase	4 Nov 2023	
Silver	Eliane Martins	(Chile) 2023 Santiago	Athletics	Women's long jump	30 Oct 2023	
Gold	Izabela Rodrigues	(Chile) 2023 Santiago	Athletics	Women's discus throw	30 Oct 2023	
Silver	Andressa de Morais	(Chile) 2023 Santiago	Athletics	Women's discus throw	30 Oct 2023	
Silver	Douglas Hernandes; Letícia Nonato; Lucas Conceição; Tiffani Marinho	(Chile) 2023 Santiago	Athletics	Mixed 4 × 400 m relay	30 Oct 2023	
Bronze	Viviane Lyra; Caio Bonfim	(Chile) 2023 Santiago	Athletics	Mixed race walk team	4 Nov 2023	
Silver	Fabrício Farias; Davi Silva	(Chile) 2023 Santiago	Badminton	Men's doubles	25 Oct 2023	
Bronze	Sânia Lima; Juliana Vieira	(Chile) 2023 Santiago	Badminton	Women's doubles	24 Oct 2023	
Bronze	Davi Silva; Sânia Lima	(Chile) 2023 Santiago	Badminton	Mixed doubles	24 Oct 2023	
Silver	Men's baseball team: André Rienzo Ariel Frigo Daniel Missaki Douglas Takano Enzo Sawayama Eric Pardinho Fábio Murakami Felipe Fukuda Felipe Mizukosi Felipe Natel Gabriel Barbosa Gabriel do Carmo Jean Tomé Lucas Rojo Lucas Sakay Murilo Gouvea Oscar Nakaoshi Osvaldo Carvalho Jr. Paulo Orlando Pedro Okuda Raphael Parra Salomon Koba Victor Coutinho	(Chile) 2023 Santiago	Baseball	Men's tournament	28 Oct 2023	
Bronze	Men's basketball team: Danilo Fuzaro Didi Louzada Elio Corazza Felipe Sandoval Gabriel Jaú Guilherme Pereira Scott Machado Lucas Dias Maique Oliveira Márcio Henrique Reynan dos Santos Wesley Castro	(Chile) 2023 Santiago	Basketball	Men's tournament	4 Nov 2023	
Gold	Women's basketball team: Aline Cezário Ana de Oliveira Carina dos Santos Débora Costa Emanuely de Oliveira Érika de Souza Gabriella Darrigo Leila Zabani Licinara Rodrigues Maria Lopes Mariana Moura Vanessa Fausto	(Chile) 2023 Santiago	Basketball	Women's tournament	29 Oct 2023	
Bronze	Filipe Otheguy	(Chile) 2023 Santiago	Basque pelota	Men's frontball	4 Nov 2023	
Gold	André Stein; George Wanderley	(Chile) 2023 Santiago	Beach volleyball	Men's tournament	27 Oct 2023	
Gold	Ana Patrícia Ramos; Duda Lisboa	(Chile) 2023 Santiago	Beach volleyball	Women's tournament	27 Oct 2023	
Silver	Michael Trindade	(Chile) 2023 Santiago	Boxing	Men's flyweight (-51 kg)	27 Oct 2023	
Bronze	Luiz Gabriel Oliveira	(Chile) 2023 Santiago	Boxing	Men's featherweight (-57 kg)	26 Oct 2023	
Bronze	Yuri Falcão	(Chile) 2023 Santiago	Boxing	Men's lightweight (-63,5 kg)	26 Oct 2023	
Silver	Wanderley Pereira	(Chile) 2023 Santiago	Boxing	Men's middleweight (-80 kg)	27 Oct 2023	
Silver	Keno Machado	(Chile) 2023 Santiago	Boxing	Men's heavyweight (-92 kg)	27 Oct 2023	
Silver	Abner Teixeira	(Chile) 2023 Santiago	Boxing	Men's super heavyweight (+92 kg)	27 Oct 2023	
Gold	Caroline de Almeida	(Chile) 2023 Santiago	Boxing	Women's flyweight (-50 kg)	28 Oct 2023	
Silver	Tatiana Chagas	(Chile) 2023 Santiago	Boxing	Women's bantamweight (-54 kg)	27 Oct 2023	
Gold	Jucielen Romeu	(Chile) 2023 Santiago	Boxing	Women's featherweight (-57 kg)	27 Oct 2023	
Gold	Beatriz Ferreira	(Chile) 2023 Santiago	Boxing	Women's lightweight (-60 kg)	27 Oct 2023	
Gold	Bárbara dos Santos	(Chile) 2023 Santiago	Boxing	Women's welterweight (-66 kg)	27 Oct 2023	
Bronze	Viviane Pereira	(Chile) 2023 Santiago	Boxing	Women's middleweight (-75 kg)	26 Oct 2023	
Silver	Isaquias Queiroz	(Chile) 2023 Santiago	Canoeing	Men's C-1 1000 m	4 Nov 2023	
Silver	Evandilson Avelar; Filipe Santana	(Chile) 2023 Santiago	Canoeing	Men's C-2 500 m	3 Nov 2023	
Silver	Kauã da Silva	(Chile) 2023 Santiago	Canoeing	Men's slalom C-1	29 Oct 2023	
Silver	Pepe Gonçalves	(Chile) 2023 Santiago	Canoeing	Men's slalom K-1	29 Oct 2023	
Gold	Guilherme Mapelli	(Chile) 2023 Santiago	Canoeing	Men's slalom K-1 cross	29 Oct 2023	
Gold	Ana Sátila	(Chile) 2023 Santiago	Canoeing	Women's slalom C-1	29 Oct 2023	
Silver	Omira Estácia Neta	(Chile) 2023 Santiago	Canoeing	Women's slalom K-1	29 Oct 2023	
Gold	Ana Sátila	(Chile) 2023 Santiago	Canoeing	Women's slalom K-1 cross	29 Oct 2023	
Bronze	Gustavo Oliveira	(Chile) 2023 Santiago	Cycling	Men's BMX freestyle	5 Nov 2023	
Bronze	José Gabriel Marques	(Chile) 2023 Santiago	Cycling	Men's mountain bike	21 Oct 2023	
Bronze	Raiza Goulão	(Chile) 2023 Santiago	Cycling	Women's mountain bike	21 Oct 2023	
Bronze	Giovanna Pedroso; Ingrid Oliveira	(Chile) 2023 Santiago	Diving	Women's synchronized 10 m platform	23 Oct 2023	
Silver	João Oliva	(Chile) 2023 Santiago	Equestrian	Dressage	25 Oct 2023	
Silver	João Oliva; Manuel Almeida; Paulo César dos Santos; Renderson Silva	(Chile) 2023 Santiago	Equestrian	Dressage team	23 Oct 2023	
Silver	Márcio Jorge	(Chile) 2023 Santiago	Equestrian	Eventing	29 Oct 2023	
Bronze	Carlos Parro; Márcio Jorge; Rafael Losano; Ruy Fonseca	(Chile) 2023 Santiago	Equestrian	Eventing team	29 Oct 2023	
Gold	Stephan Barcha	(Chile) 2023 Santiago	Equestrian	Jumping	3 Nov 2023	
Bronze	Marlon Zanotelli; Pedro Veniss; Rodrigo Pessoa; Stephan Barcha	(Chile) 2023 Santiago	Equestrian	Jumping team	1 Nov 2023	
Bronze	Alexandre Camargo	(Chile) 2023 Santiago	Fencing	Men's épée	30 Oct 2023	
Bronze	Guilherme Toldo	(Chile) 2023 Santiago	Fencing	Men's foil	31 Oct 2023	
Bronze	Guilherme Toldo; Henrique Marques; Pedro Marostega	(Chile) 2023 Santiago	Fencing	Men's foil team	3 Nov 2023	
Gold	Amanda Simeão; Nathalie Moellhausen; Victória Vizeu	(Chile) 2023 Santiago	Fencing	Women's épée team	4 Nov 2023	
Bronze	Mariana Pistoia	(Chile) 2023 Santiago	Fencing	Women's foil	30 Oct 2023	
Gold	Men's football team: Andrew Arthur Chaves Figueiredo Gabriel Pirani Guilherme Biro Gustavo Martins Igor Jesus Kaio César Marquinhos Matheus Dias Matheus Donelli Matheus Nascimento Michel Miranda Mycael Patryck Lanza Ronald Thauan Lara	(Chile) 2023 Santiago	Football	Men's tournament	4 Nov 2023	
Bronze	Arthur Nory Mariano; Bernardo Miranda; Diogo Soares; Patrick Sampaio; Yuri Guimarães	(Chile) 2023 Santiago	Gymnastics	Artistic gymnastics men's all-around team	21 Oct 2023	
Silver	Diogo Soares	(Chile) 2023 Santiago	Gymnastics	Artistic gymnastics men's all-around	23 Oct 2023	
Silver	Arthur Nory Mariano	(Chile) 2023 Santiago	Gymnastics	Artistic gymnastics men's floor exercise	24 Oct 2023	
Silver	Arthur Nory Mariano	(Chile) 2023 Santiago	Gymnastics	Artistic gymnastics men's vault	25 Oct 2023	
Gold	Arthur Nory Mariano	(Chile) 2023 Santiago	Gymnastics	Artistic gymnastics men's horizontal bar	25 Oct 2023	
Silver	Bernardo Miranda	(Chile) 2023 Santiago	Gymnastics	Artistic gymnastics men's horizontal bar	25 Oct 2023	
Silver	Carolyne Pedro; Flávia Saraiva; Jade Barbosa; Júlia Soares; Rebeca Andrade	(Chile) 2023 Santiago	Gymnastics	Artistic gymnastics women's all-around team	22 Oct 2023	
Silver	Flávia Saraiva	(Chile) 2023 Santiago	Gymnastics	Artistic gymnastics women's all-around	23 Oct 2023	
Gold	Rebeca Andrade	(Chile) 2023 Santiago	Gymnastics	Artistic gymnastics women's vault	24 Oct 2023	
Silver	Rebeca Andrade	(Chile) 2023 Santiago	Gymnastics	Artistic gymnastics women's uneven bars	24 Oct 2023	
Bronze	Flávia Saraiva	(Chile) 2023 Santiago	Gymnastics	Artistic gymnastics women's uneven bars	24 Oct 2023	
Gold	Rebeca Andrade	(Chile) 2023 Santiago	Gymnastics	Artistic gymnastics women's balance beam	25 Oct 2023	
Silver	Flávia Saraiva	(Chile) 2023 Santiago	Gymnastics	Artistic gymnastics women's balance beam	25 Oct 2023	
Silver	Flávia Saraiva	(Chile) 2023 Santiago	Gymnastics	Artistic gymnastics women's floor exercise	25 Oct 2023	
Gold	Bárbara Domingos	(Chile) 2023 Santiago	Gymnastics	Rhythmic gymnastics individual all-around	2 Nov 2023	
Bronze	Maria Eduarda Alexandre	(Chile) 2023 Santiago	Gymnastics	Rhythmic gymnastics individual all-around	2 Nov 2023	
Gold	Bárbara Domingos	(Chile) 2023 Santiago	Gymnastics	Rhythmic gymnastics individual ball	3 Nov 2023	
Silver	Geovanna Santos	(Chile) 2023 Santiago	Gymnastics	Rhythmic gymnastics individual ball	3 Nov 2023	
Gold	Maria Eduarda Alexandre	(Chile) 2023 Santiago	Gymnastics	Rhythmic gymnastics individual clubs	4 Nov 2023	
Silver	Bárbara Domingos	(Chile) 2023 Santiago	Gymnastics	Rhythmic gymnastics individual clubs	4 Nov 2023	
Gold	Maria Eduarda Alexandre	(Chile) 2023 Santiago	Gymnastics	Rhythmic gymnastics individual hoop	3 Nov 2023	
Silver	Bárbara Domingos	(Chile) 2023 Santiago	Gymnastics	Rhythmic gymnastics individual hoop	3 Nov 2023	
Gold	Bárbara Domingos	(Chile) 2023 Santiago	Gymnastics	Rhythmic gymnastics individual ribbon	4 Nov 2023	
Silver	Maria Eduarda Alexandre	(Chile) 2023 Santiago	Gymnastics	Rhythmic gymnastics individual ribbon	4 Nov 2023	
Gold	Bárbara Urquiza; Gabriella Coradine; Giovanna Oliveira; Nicole Pircio; Victória Borges	(Chile) 2023 Santiago	Gymnastics	Rhythmic gymnastics group all-around	2 Nov 2023	
Gold	Bárbara Urquiza; Gabriella Coradine; Giovanna Oliveira; Nicole Pircio; Victória Borges	(Chile) 2023 Santiago	Gymnastics	Rhythmic gymnastics group hoops	3 Nov 2023	
Gold	Bárbara Urquiza; Gabriella Coradine; Giovanna Oliveira; Nicole Pircio; Victória Borges	(Chile) 2023 Santiago	Gymnastics	Rhythmic gymnastics group ribbons-balls	4 Nov 2023	
Silver	Rayan Dutra	(Chile) 2023 Santiago	Gymnastics	Trampoline gymnastics men's	4 Nov 2023	
Bronze	Lucas Tobias; Rayan Dutra	(Chile) 2023 Santiago	Gymnastics	Trampoline gymnastics men's synchronized	4 Nov 2023	
Silver	Camilla Gomes	(Chile) 2023 Santiago	Gymnastics	Trampoline gymnastics women's	4 Nov 2023	
Silver	Alice Gomes; Camilla Gomes	(Chile) 2023 Santiago	Gymnastics	Trampoline gymnastics women's synchronized	4 Nov 2023	
Silver	Men's handball team: Gustavo Rodrigues Haniel Langaro Hugo Monte Jean-Pierre Dupoux João Pedro Silva José Toledo Leonardo Abrahão Leonardo Dutra Leonardo Terçariol Matheus da Silva Rangel da Rosa Rogério Moraes Ferreira Rudolph Hackbarth Thiagus Petrus	(Chile) 2023 Santiago	Handball	Men's tournament	4 Nov 2023	
Gold	Women's handball team: Adriana Castro Ana Paula Belo Bruna de Paula Francielle da Rocha Gabriela Moreschi Giulia Guarieiro Jhennifer dos Santos Larissa Araújo Marcela Arounian Mariana Costa Mariane Fernándes Patricia Matieli Renata Arruda Tamires Morena Lima	(Chile) 2023 Santiago	Handball	Women's tournament	29 Oct 2023	
Gold	Michel Augusto	(Chile) 2023 Santiago	Judo	Men's extra lightweight (-60 kg)	28 Oct 2023	
Bronze	Willian Lima	(Chile) 2023 Santiago	Judo	Men's half lightweight (-66 kg)	28 Oct 2023	
Gold	Gabriel Falcão	(Chile) 2023 Santiago	Judo	Men's lightweight (-73 kg)	29 Oct 2023	
Silver	Daniel Cargnin	(Chile) 2023 Santiago	Judo	Men's lightweight (-73 kg)	29 Oct 2023	
Gold	Guilherme Schimidt	(Chile) 2023 Santiago	Judo	Men's half middleweight (-81 kg)	29 Oct 2023	
Silver	Rafael Macedo	(Chile) 2023 Santiago	Judo	Men's middleweight (-90 kg)	30 Oct 2023	
Bronze	Kayo Santos	(Chile) 2023 Santiago	Judo	Men's half heavyweight (-100 kg)	30 Oct 2023	
Bronze	Rafael Silva	(Chile) 2023 Santiago	Judo	Men's heavyweight (+100 kg)	30 Oct 2023	
Gold	Alexia Nascimento	(Chile) 2023 Santiago	Judo	Women's extra lightweight (-48 kg)	28 Oct 2023	
Bronze	Amanda Lima	(Chile) 2023 Santiago	Judo	Women's extra lightweight (-48 kg)	28 Oct 2023	
Gold	Larissa Pimenta	(Chile) 2023 Santiago	Judo	Women's half lightweight (-52 kg)	28 Oct 2023	
Gold	Rafaela Silva	(Chile) 2023 Santiago	Judo	Women's lightweight (-57 kg)	28 Oct 2023	
Bronze	Ketleyn Quadros	(Chile) 2023 Santiago	Judo	Women's half middleweight (-63 kg)	29 Oct 2023	
Gold	Samanta Soares	(Chile) 2023 Santiago	Judo	Women's half heavyweight (-78 kg)	30 Oct 2023	
Bronze	Beatriz Souza	(Chile) 2023 Santiago	Judo	Women's heavyweight (+78 kg)	30 Oct 2023	
Silver	Willian Lima; Larissa Pimenta; Daniel Cargnin; Gabriel Falcão; Rafaela Silva; Guilherme Schimidt; Ketleyn Quadros; Rafael Macedo; Alexia Castilhos; Luana Carvalho; Leonardo Gonçalves; Samanta Soares; Rafael Silva; Beatriz Souza	(Chile) 2023 Santiago	Judo	Mixed team	31 Oct 2023	
Bronze	Douglas Brose	(Chile) 2023 Santiago	Karate	Men's kumite (-60 kg)	3 Nov 2023	
Silver	Lucas Fernandes	(Chile) 2023 Santiago	Karate	Men's kumite (+84 kg)	4 Nov 2023	
Bronze	Giovani Salgado	(Chile) 2023 Santiago	Karate	Men's kumite (+84 kg)	4 Nov 2023	
Bronze	Kelly Fernandes	(Chile) 2023 Santiago	Karate	Women's kumite (-55 kg)	4 Nov 2023	
Gold	Bárbara Rodrigues	(Chile) 2023 Santiago	Karate	Women's kumite (-68 kg)	5 Nov 2023	
Bronze	Brenda Padilha	(Chile) 2023 Santiago	Karate	Women's kumite (+68 kg)	3 Nov 2023	
Gold	Erik Medziukevicius	(Chile) 2023 Santiago	Roller sports	Artistic free skating men's	4 Nov 2023	
Silver	Bianca Ameixeiro	(Chile) 2023 Santiago	Roller sports	Artistic free skating women's	4 Nov 2023	
Silver	Augusto Akio	(Chile) 2023 Santiago	Roller sports	Skateboarding men's park	22 Oct 2023	
Gold	Lucas Rabelo	(Chile) 2023 Santiago	Roller sports	Skateboarding men's street	21 Oct 2023	
Silver	Raicca Ventura	(Chile) 2023 Santiago	Roller sports	Skateboarding women's park	22 Oct 2023	
Gold	Rayssa Leal	(Chile) 2023 Santiago	Roller sports	Skateboarding women's street	21 Oct 2023	
Silver	Pâmela Rosa	(Chile) 2023 Santiago	Roller sports	Skateboarding women's street	21 Oct 2023	
Gold	Lucas Verthein	(Chile) 2023 Santiago	Rowing	Men's single sculls	25 Oct 2023	
Silver	Beatriz Tavares	(Chile) 2023 Santiago	Rowing	Women's single sculls	25 Oct 2023	
Bronze	Women's rugby sevens team: Aline Furtado Andressa do Nascimento Bianca Silva Gabriela Lima Gisele Gomes Luiza Campos Mariana Nicolau Marina Fioravanti Milena Mariano Rafaela Zanellato Thalia Costa Yasmim Soares	(Chile) 2023 Santiago	Rugby sevens	Women's tournament	4 Nov 2023	
Gold	Mateus Isaac	(Chile) 2023 Santiago	Sailing	Men's sailboard	3 Nov 2023	
Gold	Bruno Lobo	(Chile) 2023 Santiago	Sailing	Men's kite	3 Nov 2023	
Gold	Kahena Kunze; Martine Grael	(Chile) 2023 Santiago	Sailing	Women's 49er FX	3 Nov 2023	
Bronze	Socorro Reis	(Chile) 2023 Santiago	Sailing	Women's kite	3 Nov 2023	
Bronze	Juliana Duque; Rafael Martins	(Chile) 2023 Santiago	Sailing	Snipe class	4 Nov 2023	
Bronze	Gabriela Nicolino; Samuel Albrecht	(Chile) 2023 Santiago	Sailing	Nacra 17 class	4 Nov 2023	
Bronze	Felipe Wu	(Chile) 2023 Santiago	Shooting	Men's 10 m air pistol	26 Oct 2023	
Silver	Luiz Diniz	(Chile) 2023 Santiago	Surfing	Men's SUP surf	30 Oct 2023	
Bronze	Carlos Bahia	(Chile) 2023 Santiago	Surfing	Men's longboard	30 Oct 2023	
Gold	Tatiana Weston-Webb	(Chile) 2023 Santiago	Surfing	Women's shortboard	30 Oct 2023	
Silver	Aline Adisaka	(Chile) 2023 Santiago	Surfing	Women's SUP surf	30 Oct 2023	
Silver	Chloé Calmon	(Chile) 2023 Santiago	Surfing	Women's longboard	30 Oct 2023	
Gold	Felipe Ribeiro de Souza; Guilherme Caribé; Marcelo Chierighini; Victor Alcará; Breno Correia (heats)	(Chile) 2023 Santiago	Swimming	Men's 4 × 100 m freestyle relay	21 Oct 2023	
Gold	Breno Correia; Fernando Scheffer; Guilherme Costa; Murilo Sartori; Felipe Ribeiro de Souza (heats); Leonardo Coelho Santos (heats); Luiz Altamir Melo (heats)	(Chile) 2023 Santiago	Swimming	Men's 4 × 200 m freestyle relay	24 Oct 2023	
Silver	Guilherme Basseto; Guilherme Caribé; João Gomes Jr. Vinicius Lanza; Gabriel Fantoni (heats); Raphael Windmuller (heats); Victor Alcará (heats); Victor Baganha (heats)	(Chile) 2023 Santiago	Swimming	Men's 4 × 100 m medley relay	25 Oct 2023	
Gold	Guilherme Caribé	(Chile) 2023 Santiago	Swimming	Men's 100 m freestyle	23 Oct 2023	
Bronze	Murilo Sartori	(Chile) 2023 Santiago	Swimming	Men's 200 m freestyle	22 Oct 2023	
Gold	Guilherme Costa	(Chile) 2023 Santiago	Swimming	Men's 400 m freestyle	21 Oct 2023	
Gold	Guilherme Costa	(Chile) 2023 Santiago	Swimming	Men's 800 m freestyle	23 Oct 2023	
Gold	Guilherme Costa	(Chile) 2023 Santiago	Swimming	Men's 1500 m freestyle	25 Oct 2023	
Silver	Vinicius Lanza	(Chile) 2023 Santiago	Swimming	Men's 100 m butterfly	22 Oct 2023	
Silver	Leonardo de Deus	(Chile) 2023 Santiago	Swimming	Men's 200 m butterfly	21 Oct 2023	
Bronze	Leonardo Coelho Santos	(Chile) 2023 Santiago	Swimming	Men's 200 m medley	25 Oct 2023	
Bronze	Brandonn Almeida	(Chile) 2023 Santiago	Swimming	Men's 400 m medley	24 Oct 2023	
Bronze	Ana Carolina Vieira; Celine Bispo; Giovanna Diamante; Stephanie Balduccini; Lorrane Ferreira (heats)	(Chile) 2023 Santiago	Swimming	Women's 4 × 100 m freestyle relay	21 Oct 2023	
Silver	Gabrielle Roncatto; Maria Fernanda Costa; Nathalia Almeida; Stephanie Balduccini; Celine Bispo (heats); Giovanna Diamante (heats); Maria Luíza Pessanha (heats); Maria Paula Heitmann (heats)	(Chile) 2023 Santiago	Swimming	Women's 4 × 200 m freestyle relay	24 Oct 2023	
Silver	Stephanie Balduccini	(Chile) 2023 Santiago	Swimming	Women's 100 m freestyle	23 Oct 2023	
Silver	Maria Fernanda Costa	(Chile) 2023 Santiago	Swimming	Women's 200 m freestyle	22 Oct 2023	
Silver	Maria Fernanda Costa	(Chile) 2023 Santiago	Swimming	Women's 400 m freestyle	21 Oct 2023	
Bronze	Gabrielle Roncatto	(Chile) 2023 Santiago	Swimming	Women's 400 m freestyle	21 Oct 2023	
Bronze	Viviane Jungblut	(Chile) 2023 Santiago	Swimming	Women's 800 m freestyle	23 Oct 2023	
Bronze	Viviane Jungblut	(Chile) 2023 Santiago	Swimming	Women's 1500 m freestyle	25 Oct 2023	
Bronze	Alexia Assunção	(Chile) 2023 Santiago	Swimming	Women's 200 m backstroke	22 Oct 2023	
Bronze	Gabrielle Assis	(Chile) 2023 Santiago	Swimming	Women's 200 m breaststroke	23 Oct 2023	
Bronze	Gabrielle Roncatto	(Chile) 2023 Santiago	Swimming	Women's 400 m medley	24 Oct 2023	
Gold	Ana Carolina Vieira; Guilherme Caribé; Marcelo Chierighini; Stephanie Balduccini; Felipe Ribeiro de Souza (heats); Lorrane Ferreira (heats); Nathalia Almeida (heats); Victor Alcará (heats)	(Chile) 2023 Santiago	Swimming	Mixed 4 × 100 m freestyle relay	22 Oct 2023	
Bronze	Clarissa Rodrigues; Guilherme Basseto; João Gomes Jr. Stephanie Balduccini; Gabriel Fantoni (heats); Giovanna Diamante (heats); Jhennifer Conceição (heats); Victor Baganha (heats)	(Chile) 2023 Santiago	Swimming	Mixed 4 × 100 m medley relay	23 Oct 2023	
Silver	Ana Marcela Cunha	(Chile) 2023 Santiago	Swimming	Women's marathon 10 km	29 Oct 2023	
Bronze	Viviane Jungblut	(Chile) 2023 Santiago	Swimming	Women's marathon 10 km	29 Oct 2023	
Gold	Hugo Calderano	(Chile) 2023 Santiago	Table tennis	Men's singles	2 Nov 2023	
Silver	Hugo Calderano; Vitor Ishiy	(Chile) 2023 Santiago	Table tennis	Men's doubles	31 Oct 2023	
Gold	Eric Jouti; Hugo Calderano; Vitor Ishiy	(Chile) 2023 Santiago	Table tennis	Men's team	5 Nov 2023	
Silver	Bruna Takahashi	(Chile) 2023 Santiago	Table tennis	Women's singles	1 Nov 2023	
Silver	Bruna Takahashi; Giulia Takahashi	(Chile) 2023 Santiago	Table tennis	Women's doubles	31 Oct 2023	
Bronze	Bruna Alexandre; Bruna Takahashi; Giulia Takahashi	(Chile) 2023 Santiago	Table tennis	Women's team	4 Nov 2023	
Silver	Bruna Takahashi; Vitor Ishiy	(Chile) 2023 Santiago	Table tennis	Mixed doubles	30 Oct 2023	
Bronze	Paulo Ricardo Melo	(Chile) 2023 Santiago	Taekwondo	Men's flyweight (-58 kg)	21 Oct 2023	
Bronze	Lucas Ostapiv	(Chile) 2023 Santiago	Taekwondo	Men's middleweight (-80 kg)	22 Oct 2023	
Gold	Edival Pontes; Maicon Andrade; Paulo Ricardo Melo	(Chile) 2023 Santiago	Taekwondo	Men's kyorugi team	24 Oct 2023	
Silver	Maria Clara Pacheco	(Chile) 2023 Santiago	Taekwondo	Women's featherweight (-57 kg)	21 Oct 2023	
Bronze	Caroline Santos; Maria Clara Pacheco; Sandy Macedo	(Chile) 2023 Santiago	Taekwondo	Women's kyorugi team	24 Oct 2023	
Bronze	Thiago Monteiro	(Chile) 2023 Santiago	Tennis	Men's singles	29 Oct 2023	
Gold	Gustavo Heide; Marcelo Demoliner	(Chile) 2023 Santiago	Tennis	Men's doubles	28 Oct 2023	
Gold	Laura Pigossi	(Chile) 2023 Santiago	Tennis	Women's singles	29 Oct 2023	
Silver	Laura Pigossi; Luisa Stefani	(Chile) 2023 Santiago	Tennis	Women's doubles	28 Oct 2023	
Silver	Luisa Stefani; Marcelo Demoliner	(Chile) 2023 Santiago	Tennis	Mixed doubles	28 Oct 2023	
Gold	Miguel Hidalgo	(Chile) 2023 Santiago	Triathlon	Men's individual	2 Nov 2023	
Gold	Djenyfer Arnold; Manoel Messias; Miguel Hidalgo; Vittória Lopes	(Chile) 2023 Santiago	Triathlon	Mixed relay	4 Nov 2023	
Gold	Men's volleyball team: Adriano Cavalcante Darlan Souza Felipe Roque Henrique Honorato Judson Amabel Lukas Bergmann Maicon França Maique Nascimento Matheus Gonçalves Otávio Pinto Thiago Veloso Thiery Nascimento	(Chile) 2023 Santiago	Volleyball	Men's tournament	4 Nov 2023	
Silver	Women's volleyball team: Aline Segato Carolina Leite Helena Wenk Laís Vasques Larissa Besen Lorena Viezel Luzia Nezzo Maiara Basso Naiane Rios Sabrina Machado Tainara Santos Tália Costa	(Chile) 2023 Santiago	Volleyball	Women's tournament	26 Oct 2023	
Silver	Men's water polo team: Alexandre Mendes Alípio Nardaci Bruno Chiappini Gabriel Sojo Guilherme Barella Gustavo Coutinho Gustavo Guimarães Logan Cabral Luis Ricardo Silva Marcos Vinicius Pires Pedro Real Rafael Real Roberto Freitas	(Chile) 2023 Santiago	Water polo	Men's tournament	4 Nov 2023	
Bronze	Women's water polo team: Ana Júlia Amaral Eduarda Estevão Isabela Mendes Jeniffer Cavalcante Karen da Silva Kemily Leão Letícia Belorio Letícia Silva Luana de Souza Rebecca Moreira Samantha Ferreira Stefany Azevedo Thatiana Pregolini	(Chile) 2023 Santiago	Water polo	Women's tournament	4 Nov 2023	
Bronze	Felipe Simioni	(Chile) 2023 Santiago	Water skiing	Men's slalom	23 Oct 2023	
Bronze	Laura Amaro	(Chile) 2023 Santiago	Weightlifting	Women's heavyweight (-81 kg)	23 Oct 2023	
Silver	Joílson Júnior	(Chile) 2023 Santiago	Wrestling	Men's Greco-Roman welterweight (-77 kg)	3 Nov 2023	
Bronze	Igor Queiroz	(Chile) 2023 Santiago	Wrestling	Men's Greco-Roman heavyweight (-97 kg)	4 Nov 2023	
Gold	Giullia Penalber	(Chile) 2023 Santiago	Wrestling	Women's freestyle lightweight (-57 kg)	2 Nov 2023	
Gold	Laís Nunes	(Chile) 2023 Santiago	Wrestling	Women's freestyle middleweight (-62 kg)	3 Nov 2023	

== See also ==
- List of Olympic medalists for Brazil
- Brazil at the Pan American Games
