= Equestrian at the 2015 Pan American Games – Individual eventing =

Individual eventing at the 2015 Pan American Games
- Venues: Caledon Equestrian Park; Pan Am Cross-Country Centre (Cross country–eventing)
- Dates: July 17–19, 2015.
- Competitors: 43 from 13 nations

Medalists
| Gold medal | Marilyn Little on Rf Scandalous | United States |
| Silver medal | Jessica Phoenix on Pavarotti | Canada |
| Bronze medal | Ruy Fonseca on Tom Bombadill Too | Brazil |

The individual eventing competition of the equestrian events at the 2015 Pan American Games took place July 17–19 at the Caledon Equestrian Park. The cross-country portion of eventing took place at nearby Will O' Wind Farm (Pan Am Cross-Country Centre), which is located in Mono. The eventers complete a 3-star level dressage test, stadium, and cross-country course. Eventing consisted of three phases: dressage, cross-country, and show-jumping. Scores from each phase were converted into penalty points, which were summed to give a score. For each rider, the best three scores in each phase counted towards the final score. In the dressage portion, the pair performed in front of three judges. The judges gave marks of between 0 and 10 for each of ten required elements; the scores for the judges were averaged to give a score between 0 and 100. That score was then subtracted from 100 and multiplied by 1.5 to give the number of penalty points.

The cross-county portion consisted of a 5.225 kilometre course with 30 efforts including 17 obstacles. The target time was nine and a half minutes; pairs received .4 penalty points for every second above that time. They also received 20 penalty points for every obstacle not cleanly jumped. Riders did not complete the course in under nineteen minutes were eliminated and given a score of 1000 penalty points. The final phase was the show-jumping; pairs had to negotiate a course of obstacles. The pair received 4 penalty points for each obstacle at which there was a refusal or a knockdown of the obstacle. One penalty point was also assessed for each second taken above the maximum time for the course. In addition, 1000 points are given to any rider that did not complete a competition. This includes withdrawing/not-starting (WD), retiring during the competition (RD) or being eliminated in the cross county event (EL).

The top team not already qualified in the dressage team events qualified for the 2016 Summer Olympics in Rio de Janeiro, Brazil, along with the top two placed teams (not already qualified) in the show jumping competition. In the individual dressage competition, the top nation (not qualified in the team event) in groups IV and V each qualified one quota. The top six athletes (not qualified in the team event) also qualified for the show jumping competition.

== Schedule ==
All times are Central Standard Time (UTC-6).

| Day | Start | Round |
|---|---|---|
| July 17, 2015 | 9:00 | Dressage |
| July 18, 2015 | 11:00 | Cross country |
| July 19, 2015 | 13:00 | Jumping final |

== Results ==
| Rank | Rider | Nation | Horse | Dressage | | Cross Country | | Jumping | | Total |
| Rank | Rider | Nation | Horse | Points | Rank | Points | Rank | Points | Rank | Total |
|---|---|---|---|---|---|---|---|---|---|---|
| 1st place, gold medalist(s) | Marilyn Little | United States | Rf Scandalous | 40.30 | 3 | 0.00 | 1 | 0.00 | 1 | 40.30 |
| 2nd place, silver medalist(s) | Jessica Phoenix | Canada | Pavarotti | 42.10 | 4 | 0.00 | 1 | 0.00 | 1 | 42.10 |
| 3rd place, bronze medalist(s) | Ruy Fonseca | Brazil | Tom Bombadill Too | 38.90 | 1 | 0.00 | 1 | 4.00 | 19 | 42.90 |
| 4 | Boyd Martin | United States | Pancho Villa | 44.30 | 5 | 0.00 | 1 | 0.00 | 1 | 44.30 |
| 5 | Carlos Lobos | Chile | Ranco | 45.30 | 6 | 0.00 | 1 | 0.00 | 1 | 45.30 |
| 6 | Carlos Parro | Brazil | Caulcourt Landline | 45.60 | 7 | 0.00 | 1 | 0.00 | 1 | 45.60 |
| 7 | Lauren Kieffer | United States | Meadowbrook's Scarlett | 48.40 | 8 | 0.00 | 1 | 0.00 | 1 | 48.40 |
| 8 | Colleen Loach | Canada | Qorry Blue D'Argouges | 51.80 | 10 | 0.00 | 1 | 0.00 | 1 | 51.80 |
| 9 | Márcio Jorge | Brazil | Lissy Mac Wayer | 52.20 | 11 | 0.00 | 1 | 0.00 | 1 | 52.20 |
| 10 | Phillip Dutton | United States | Fernhill Fugitive | 48.40 | 8 | 0.00 | 1 | 4.00 | 19 | 52.40 |
| 11 | Henrique Plombon | Brazil | Land Quenotte | 55.40 | 17 | 0.00 | 1 | 0.00 | 1 | 55.40 |
| 12 | Daniela Moguel | Mexico | Cecelia | 53.70 | 15 | 0.00 | 1 | 4.00 | 19 | 57.70 |
| 13 | Nicolas Wettstein | Ecuador | Onzieme Framoni | 60.50 | 22 | 0.00 | 1 | 0.00 | 1 | 60.50 |
| 14 | Carlos Narvaez | Ecuador | Que Loco | 56.80 | 19 | 0.00 | 1 | 4.00 | 19 | 60.80 |
| 15 | Ronald Zabala-Goetschel | Ecuador | Master Boy | 52.80 | 12 | 0.00 | 1 | 12.00 | 29 | 64.80 |
| 16 | Elena Ceballo | Venezuela | Nounours du Moulin | 65.20 | 34 | 0.00 | 1 | 0.00 | 1 | 65.20 |
| 17 | Waylon Roberts | Canada | Bill Owen | 65.10 | 33 | 0.00 | 1 | 4.00 | 19 | 69.10 |
| 18 | Lauren Billys | Puerto Rico | Castle Larchfield Purdy | 57.50 | 20 | 0.80 | 19 | 19.00 | 30 | 77.30 |
| 19 | Sergio Iturriaga | Chile | Versalles | 60.70 | 23 | 10.40 | 20 | 8.00 | 25 | 79.10 |
| 20 | Luciano Claudio Brunello | Argentina | Erevan | 65.30 | 35 | 16.00 | 22 | 4.00 | 19 | 85.30 |
| 21 | Francisco Calvelo | Uruguay | Noir de la Muralla | 86.80 | 42 | 0.00 | 1 | 0.00 | 1 | 86.80 |
| 22 | José Mercado | Mexico | Romana | 61.10 | 25 | 26.40 | 24 | 0.00 | 1 | 87.50 |
| 23 | Guillermo de Campo | Mexico | Quelite | 59.30 | 21 | 28.80 | 26 | 0.00 | 1 | 88.10 |
| 24 | Sofia Baussan Augspuer | El Salvador | Durango | 61.60 | 26 | 12.40 | 21 | 19.00 | 30 | 93.00 |
| 25 | Santiago Medina Negrete | Colombia | Ritmical Ejc | 70.10 | 39 | 29.60 | 27 | 0.00 | 1 | 99.70 |
| 26 | Edison Quintana | Uruguay | Svr Capoeira II | 64.10 | 32 | 39.20 | 28 | 0.00 | 1 | 103.30 |
| 27 | Juan Francisco Gallo | Argentina | Remonta Nunhil | 70.50 | 40 | 27.60 | 25 | 8.00 | 25 | 106.10 |
| 28 | Jhonatan Rodríguez | Colombia | Nilo | 63.50 | 30 | 24.00 | 23 | 23.00 | 32 | 110.50 |
| 29 | Rodrigo Abella Lemme | Uruguay | Svr Arbitro | 63.90 | 31 | 44.00 | 29 | 9.00 | 27 | 116.90 |
| 30 | Juan Carlos Tafur | Colombia | Quinto | 61.60 | 26 | 57.60 | 31 | 0.00 | 1 | 119.20 |
| 31 | Guillermo Garín | Chile | Ubago | 65.70 | 36 | 46.40 | 30 | 9.00 | 27 | 121.10 |
| 32 | Sarka Kolackova | Guatemala | Sir Royal | 52.90 | 13 | 88.80 | 32 | 0.00 | 1 | 141.70 |
| | Marcelo Rawson | Argentina | Larthago | 56.40 | 18 | EL | | | | EL |
| | José Luis Ortelli | Argentina | Jos Cassius | 54.30 | 16 | EL | | | | EL |
| | Kathryn Robinson | Canada | Let It Bee | 38.90 | 2 | EL | | | | EL |
| | Carlos Villarroel | Chile | Paradigma | 68.30 | 38 | EL | | | | EL |
| | Anne Brieke | Colombia | Picaron | 61.00 | 24 | EL | | | | EL |
| | Jose Romano Hijo | El Salvador | Bucefalo | 67.40 | 37 | EL | | | | EL |
| | Tiziana Billy Prem | Guatemala | Luccio | 72.30 | 41 | EL | | | | EL |
| | Stefanie Brand Leu | Guatemala | Claudius | 53.00 | 14 | EL | | | | EL |
| | Alvaro Lozada Rivero | Venezuela | Urileva | 62.30 | 28 | EL | | | | EL |
| | Juan Larrazabal Simon | Venezuela | Atlanta | 63.10 | 29 | EL | | | | EL |
| | Alvaro Del Valle | Guatemala | Nahual | WD | | | | | | WD |
