= Equestrian events at the 2015 Pan American Games =

- Equestrian pictogram for the games
- Venues: Caledon Equestrian Park; Pan Am Cross-Country Centre (cross country–eventing)
- Dates: July 11–25
- No. of events: 6 (6 open)
- Competitors: 146 from 19 nations

Equestrian competitions at the 2015 Pan American Games in Toronto were held from July 11 to 25 at the Caledon Equestrian Park in Palgrave. The cross-country portion of eventing took place at nearby Will O' Wind Farm (Pan Am Cross-Country Centre), which is located in Mono. Due to naming rights the venue was known as the latter for the duration of the games. The competition was split into three disciplines, dressage, eventing and show jumping. Each discipline awarded a team and individual set of medals.

The top team not already qualified in the dressage and eventing team events qualified for the 2016 Summer Olympics in Rio de Janeiro, Brazil, along with the top two placed teams (not already qualified) in the show jumping competition. In the individual dressage competition, the top nation (not qualified in the team event) in groups IV and V each qualified one quota. The top six athletes (not qualified in the team event) also qualified for the show jumping competition.

== Competition schedule ==
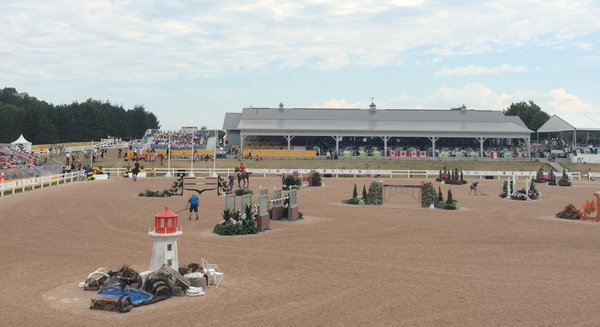
The Caledon Equestrian Park, in Caledon, was the venue for equestrian competitions (besides the cross-country event)

The following is the competition schedule for the equestrian competitions:

| Q | Qualification | F | Final |

| Event↓/Date → | Sat 11 | Sun 12 | Tue 14 | Fri 17 | Sat 18 | Sun 19 | Tue 21 | Thu 23 | Sat 25 |
|---|---|---|---|---|---|---|---|---|---|
| Individual dressage | Q | Q | F | | | | | | |
| Team dressage | Q | F | | | | | | | |
| Individual eventing | | | | Q | Q | F | | | |
| Team eventing | | | | Q | Q | F | | | |
| Individual jumping | | | | | | | Q | Q | F |
| Team jumping | | | | | | | Q | F | |

== Medal table ==
* Host nation (Canada)

| Rank | Nation | Gold | Silver | Bronze | Total |
|---|---|---|---|---|---|
| 1 | United States | 5 | 1 | 2 | 8 |
| 2 | Canada* | 1 | 2 | 2 | 5 |
| 3 | Brazil | 0 | 1 | 2 | 3 |
| 4 | Argentina | 0 | 1 | 0 | 1 |
| 4 | Venezuela | 0 | 1 | 0 | 1 |
| Totals (5 entries) | | 6 | 6 | 6 | 18 |

== Medalists ==
| Event | Gold | Silver | Bronze |
|---|---|---|---|
| Individual dressage | Steffen Peters on Legolas 92; United States | Laura Graves on Verdades; United States | Christopher von Martels on Zilverstar; Canada |
| Team dressage | United States; Sabine Schut-Kery on Sanceo; Kimberly Herslow on Rosmarin; Laura Graves on Verdades; Steffen Peters on Legolas 92 | Canada; Christopher von Martels on Zilverstar; Brittany Fraser on All in Megan Lane on Caravella; Belinda Trussell on Anton | Brazil; Leandro Silva on Di Caprio; Sarah Waddell on Donelly 3 João Oliva on Xama dos Pinhais; João dos Santos on Veleiro do Top |
| Individual eventing | Marilyn Little on Rf Scandalous; United States | Jessica Phoenix on Pavarotti; Canada | Ruy Fonseca on Tom Bombadill Too; Brazil |
| Team eventing | United States; Marilyn Little on Rf Scandalous; Boyd Martin on Pancho Villa; Phillip Dutton on Fernhill Fugitive; Lauren Kieffer on Meadowbrook's Scarlett | Brazil; Ruy Fonseca on Tom Bombadill Too; Carlos Parro on Caulcourt Landline; Márcio Jorge on Lissy Mac Wayer; Henrique Plombon on Land Quenotte | Canada; Kathryn Robinson on Let It Bee; Jessica Phoenix on Pavarotti; Colleen Loach on Qorry Blue D'Argouges; Waylon Roberts on Bill Owen |
| Individual jumping | McLain Ward on Rothchild; United States | Andrés Rodríguez on Darlon Van Groenhove; Venezuela | Lauren Hough on Ohlala; United States |
| Team jumping | Canada; Yann Candele on Showgirl; Tiffany Foster on Tripple X III; Eric Lamaze on Coco Bongo; Ian Millar on Dixson | Argentina; José María Larocca on Cornet du Lys; Matías Albarracín on Cannavaro 9 Luis Birabén on Abunola; Ramiro Quintana on Whitney | United States; McLain Ward on Rothchild; Georgina Bloomberg on Lilli; Lauren Hough on Ohlala; Kent Farrington on Gazelle |

== Participating nations ==
A total of 19 countries have qualified athletes. The number of athletes a nation has entered is in parentheses beside the name of the country.

- Argentina (13)
- Barbados (1)
- Bermuda (3)
- Brazil (13)
- Canada (13)
- Chile (13)
- Colombia (13)
- Costa Rica (3)
- Dominican Republic (3)
- Ecuador (6)
- El Salvador (2)
- Guatemala (12)
- Honduras (1)
- Mexico (12)
- Peru (1)
- Puerto Rico (4)
- United States (13)
- Uruguay (8)
- Venezuela (11)

== Qualification ==
A quota of 150 equestrian riders (45 dressage, 50 eventing and 55 show jumping) were allowed to qualify. A maximum of 12 athletes could compete for a nation across all events (with a maximum of four per event). Athletes qualified through various qualifying events and rankings.

== See also ==
- Equestrian events at the 2016 Summer Olympics
