= Equestrian at the 2023 Pan American Games – Individual eventing =

Individual dressage at the 2023 Pan American Games
- Venue: Granaderos Regiment Equestrian School
- Dates: October 27 - October 29
- Competitors: 38 from 9 nations
- Winning score: 30.8

Medalists
Gold medal	Caroline Pamukcu on HSH Blake	United States
Silver medal	Márcio Jorge on Castle Howard Casanova	Brazil
Bronze medal	Lindsay Traisnel on Bacyrouge	Canada

The individual eventing competition of the equestrian events at the 2023 Pan American Games was held from October 27 to 29 at the Granaderos Regiment Equestrian School (Escuela de Equitación Regimiento Granaderos) in Quillota, Chile.

== Schedule ==
Date	Time	Round
October 27, 2023	11:00	Dressage
October 28, 2023	11:00	Cross Country
October 29, 2023	12:00	Show Jumping

== Results ==
The results were as follows:

Rank	Rider	Horse	Nation	Dressage		Cross Country		Jumping		Total
Rank	Rider	Horse	Nation	Points	Rank	Points	Rank	Points	Rank	Total
1st place, gold medalist(s)	Caroline Pamukcu	United States	HSH Blake	26.8	2	0.0	1	4.0	1	30.8
2nd place, silver medalist(s)	Márcio Jorge	Brazil	Castle Howard Casanova	29.8	5	1.6	4	0.8	2	32.2
3rd place, bronze medalist(s)	Lindsay Traisnel	Canada	Bacyrouge	32.6	7	0.0	5	1.6	3	34.2
4	Karl Slezak	Canada	Hot Bobo	32.7	8	0.0	6	8.0	4	40.7
5	Michael Winter	Canada	El Mundo	32.3	6	7.6	10	0.8	5	40.7
6	Colleen Loach	Canada	Fe Golden Eye	28.6	4	13.2	11	0.0	6	41.8
7	Elisabeth Halliday	United States	Miks Master C	24.8	1	4.0	2	13.6	7	42.4
8	Sydney Elliott	United States	Qc Diamantaire	33.3	10	0.0	7	9.2	8	42.5
9	Rafael Losano	Brazil	Withington	36.1	12	0.0	9	8.8	9	44.9
10	Sharon White	United States	Claus 63	28.2	3	2.4	3	16.4	10	47.0
11	Carlos Parro	Brazil	Safira	34.0	11	0.0	8	16.0	11	50.0
12	Ruy Fonseca	Brazil	Ballypatrick SRS	26.7	14	19.6	13	0.4	12	56.7
13	Fernando Parroquin Delfín	Mexico	Anahuac SDN	32.9	9	26.4	14	5.2	13	64.5
14	Nicolás Wettstein	Ecuador	Altier d'Aurois	38.0	15	9.6	12	19.2	14	66.8
15	Juan Benpitez Gallardo	Argentina	Chaman Ginn	45.1	25	16.0	15	10.4	15	71.5
16	Marcelo Javier Rawson	Argentina	Baral Villester	45.3	27	23.2	18	12.8	16	81.3
17	Eduardo Rivero Fragoso	Mexico	Bimori SDN	39.9	19	22.8	16	26.0	17	88.7
18	Luis Santiago Franco	Mexico	Egipcio II	36.4	13	50.6	22	12.8	18	99.8
19	Luciano Claudio Brunello	Argentina	Cash des Cedres	46.1	28	18.4	17	36.8	19	101.3
20	Mauricio Bermúdez	Colombia	Vardags Saratoga	49.5	31	31.6	20	22.4	20	103.5
21	Federico Daners Bidegain	Uruguay	Demitasse	38.7	17	53.6	23	24.8	21	117.1
22	Rufino Dominguez Midon	Uruguay	SVR Edecan de La Luz	55.9	33	37.6	24	30.0	22	123.5
23	Jaime Bittner Martinez	Chile	All Red	42.4	23	38.0	19	51.2	23	131.6
24	Nicolás Fuentes Escala	Chile	Midnight	45.0	24	36.4	21	52.0	24	133.4
25	José Mercado Suarez	Mexico	Balanca SDN	46.4	29	81.6	25	11.2	25	139.2
26	Edison Quintana Valerio	Uruguay	SVR Fraile del Santa Lucía	38.3	16	EL				EL
27	Juan Carlos Candisano	Argentina	Remonta Urmelia	39.1	18	EL				EL
28	Juan Tafur	Colombia	Blue Moon	40.8	20	EL				EL
29	Lucero Desrochers	Colombia	Gama Castellon	41.5	21	EL				EL
30	Nicolás Ibañez	Chile	Domingo	42.1	22	EL				EL
31	Guillermo Garín Heyermann	Chile	HSB Sidonia	45.2	26	EL				EL
32	Gastón Marcenal	Chile	SVR Indy	48.1	30	EL				EL
33	Andrés Gómez	Colombia	Caroline	51.5	32	EL				EL
34	Diego Zurita	Ecuador	Merlin Way	55.9	34	EL				EL
