= Equestrian at the 2015 Pan American Games – Team eventing =

Team eventing at the 2015 Pan American Games
- Venues: Caledon Equestrian Park; Pan Am Cross-Country Centre (Cross country–eventing)
- Dates: July 17–19, 2015.
- Competitors: 40 from 11 nations

Medalists
Gold medal	Marilyn Little on Rf Scandalous; Boyd Martin on Pancho Villa; Phillip Dutton on Fernhill Fugitive; Lauren Kieffer on Meadowbrooks Scarlett	United States
Silver medal	Ruy Fonseca on Tom Bombadill Too; Carlos Parro on Caulcourt Landline; Márcio Jorge on Lissy Mac Wayer; Henrique Plombon on Land Quenotte	Brazil
Bronze medal	Kathryn Robinson on Let It Bee; Jessica Phoenix on Pavarotti; Colleen Loach on Qorry Blue D'Argouges; Waylon Roberts on Bill Owen	Canada

The team eventing competition of the equestrian events at the 2015 Pan American Games took place July 17–19 at the Caledon Equestrian Park. The cross-country portion of eventing took place at nearby Will O' Wind Farm (Pan Am Cross-Country Centre), which is located in Mono.

Team eventing consisted of three phases: dressage, cross-country, and show-jumping. Scores from each phase were converted into penalty points, which were summed to give a score. Teams of up to five horse and rider pairs competed; for each team, the best three scores in each phase counted towards the team score. In the dressage portion, the pair performed in front of three judges. The judges gave marks of between 0 and 10 for each of ten required elements; the scores for the judges were averaged to give a score between 0 and 100. That score was then subtracted from 100 and multiplied by 1.5 to give the number of penalty points. The cross-county portion consisted of a 5.225 kilometre course with 30 efforts including 17 obstacles. The target time was nine and a half minutes; pairs received .4 penalty points for every second above that time. They also received 20 penalty points for every obstacle not cleanly jumped. Riders did not complete the course in under nineteen minutes were eliminated and given a score of 1000 penalty points. The final phase was the show-jumping; pairs had to negotiate a course of obstacles. The pair received 4 penalty points for each obstacle at which there was a refusal or a knockdown of the obstacle. One penalty point was also assessed for each second taken above the maximum time for the course.

In addition, 1000 points are given to any rider that did not complete a competition. This includes withdrawing/not-starting (WD), retiring during the competition (RD) or being eliminated in the cross county event (EL). The results of the team phase were also used in the individual eventing event, though that event added a second jumping phase as a final.

The top team not already qualified in the dressage team events qualified for the 2016 Summer Olympics in Rio de Janeiro, Brazil, along with the top two placed teams (not already qualified) in the show jumping competition. In the individual dressage competition, the top nation (not qualified in the team event) in groups IV and V each qualified one quota. The top six athletes (not qualified in the team event) also qualified for the show jumping competition.

== Schedule ==
All times are Central Standard Time (UTC-6).

Day	Start	Round
July 17, 2015	9:00	Dressage
July 18, 2015	11:00	Cross country
July 19, 2015	13:00	Jumping final

== Results ==
Rank	Nation	Name	Horse	Dressage			Cross country			Jumping			Total	
Rank	Nation	Name	Horse	Individual	Team	Rank	Individual	Team	Rank	Individual	Team	Rank	Individual	Team
1st place, gold medalist(s)	United States	Marilyn Little; Boyd Martin; Phillip Dutton; Lauren Kieffer	Rf Scandalous; Pancho Villa; Fernhill Fugitive; Meadowbrook's Scarlett	40.30; 44.30; 48.40; 48.40	133.00	1	0.00; 0.00; 0.00; 0.00	0.00	1	0.00; 0.00; 4.00; 0.00	0.00	1	40.30; 44.30 # 52.40; 48.40	133.00
2nd place, silver medalist(s)	Brazil	Ruy Fonseca; Carlos Parro; Márcio Jorge; Henrique Plombon	Tom Bombadill Too; Caulcourt Landline; Lissy Mac Wayer; Land Quenotte	38.90; 45.60; 52.20; 55.40	136.70	3	0.00; 0.00; 0.00; 0.00	0.00	1	4.00; 0.00; 0.00; 0.00	0.00	1	42.90; 45.60; 52.20 # 55.40	140.70
3rd place, bronze medalist(s)	Canada	Kathryn Robinson; Jessica Phoenix; Colleen Loach; Waylon Roberts	Let It Bee; Pavarotti; Qorry Blue D'Argouges; Bill Owen	38.90; 42.10; 51.80; 65.10	133.70	2	1000.00; 0.00; 0.00; 0.00	0.00	1	– 0.00; 0.00; 4.00	4.00	4	# 1000.00; 42.10; 51.80; 69.10	163.00
4	Ecuador	Ronald Zabala-Goetschel; Carlos Narvaez; Nicolas Wettstein	Master Boy; Que Loco; Onzieme Framoni	52.80; 56.80; 60.50	170.10	4	0.00; 0.00; 0.00	0.00	1	12.00; 4.00; 0.00	16.00	9	64.80; 60.80; 60.50	186.10
5	Mexico	Daniela Moguel; José Mercado; Guillermo de Campo	Cecelia; Romana; Quelite	53.70; 61.10; 59.30	174.10	6	0.00; 26.40; 28.80	55.20	5	4.00; 0.00; 0.00	4.00	4	57.70; 87.50; 88.10	233.30
6	Chile	Carlos Villarroel; Carlos Lobos; Sergio Iturriaga; Guillermo Garín	Paradigma; Ranco; Versalles; Ubago	68.30; 45.30; 60.70; 65.70	171.70	5	1000.00; 0.00; 10.40; 46.40	56.80	6	– 0.00; 8.00; 9.00	17.00	10	# 1000.00; 45.30; 79.10; 121.10	245.50
7	Uruguay	Francisco Calvelo; Edison Quintana; Rodrigo Abella Lemme	Noir de la Muralla; Svr Capoeira II; Svr Arbitro	86.80; 64.10; 63.90	214.80	11	0.00; 39.20; 44.00	83.20	7	0.00; 0.00; 9.00	9.00	7	86.80; 103.30; 116.90	307.00
8	Colombia	Anne Brieke; Jhonatan Rodríguez; Santiago Medina Negrete; Juan Carlos Tafur	Picaron; Nilo; Ritmical Ejc; Quinto	61.00; 63.50; 70.10; 61.60	186.10	9	1000.00; 24.00; 29.60; 57.60	111.20	8	– 23.00; 0.00; 0.00	23.00	11	# 1000.00; 110.50; 99.70; 119.20	329.40
9	Argentina	Marcelo Rawson; José Luis Ortelli; Luciano Claudio Brunello; Juan Francisco Gallo	Larthago; Jos Cassius; Erevan; Remonta Nunhil	56.40; 54.30; 65.30; 70.50	176.00	7	1000.00; 1000.00; 16.00; 27.60	1043.60	9	– – 4.00; 8.00	12.00	8	# 1000.00; 1000.00; 85.30; 106.10	1191.40
10	Venezuela	Juan Larrazabal Simon; Alvaro Lozada Rivero; Elena Ceballo	Atlanta; Urileva; Nounours du Moulin	63.10; 62.30; 65.20	190.60	10	1000.00; 1000.00; 0.00	2000.00	10	– – 0.00	0.00	1	1000.00; 1000.00; 65.20	2065.20
11	Guatemala	Stefanie Brand Leu; Tiziana Billy Prem; Alvaro Del Valle; Sarka Kolackova	Claudius; Luccio; Nahual; Sir Royal	53.00; 72.30; WD; 52.90	178.20	8	1000.00; 1000.00 – 88.80	2088.80	11	– – – 0.00	0.00	1	# 1000.00; 1000.00; 1000.00; 141.70	2141.70
