= Equestrian events at the 2016 Summer Olympics – Qualification =

== Summary ==
| Nation | Individual | | | Team | | | Total |
| Nation | Dressage | Eventing | Jumping | Dressage | Eventing | Jumping | Total |
|---|---|---|---|---|---|---|---|
| Argentina | | | 4 | | | X | 4 |
| Australia | 4 | 4 | 4 | X | X | X | 12 |
| Austria | 1 | | | | | | 1 |
| Belgium | 1 | 2 | 2 | | | | 5 |
| Brazil | 4 | 4 | 4 | X | X | X | 12 |
| Canada | 2 | 4 | 4 | | X | X | 10 |
| Chile | | 1 | | | | | 1 |
| China | | 1 | | | | | 1 |
| Colombia | | | 2 | | | | 2 |
| Denmark | 4 | | | X | | | 4 |
| Dominican Republic | 1 | | | | | | 1 |
| Ecuador | | 1 | | | | | 1 |
| Egypt | | | 1 | | | | 1 |
| Finland | | 1 | | | | | 1 |
| France | 4 | 4 | 4 | X | X | X | 12 |
| Germany | 4 | 4 | 4 | X | X | X | 12 |
| Great Britain | 4 | 4 | 4 | X | X | X | 12 |
| Ireland | 1 | 4 | 1 | | X | | 6 |
| Italy | 1 | 4 | 1 | | X | | 6 |
| Japan | 4 | 2 | 4 | X | | X | 10 |
| Mexico | 1 | | | | | | 1 |
| Morocco | | | 1 | | | | 1 |
| Netherlands | 4 | 4 | 4 | X | X | X | 12 |
| New Zealand | 1 | 4 | | | X | | 5 |
| Palestine | 1 | | | | | | 1 |
| Peru | | | 1 | | | | 1 |
| Poland | | 1 | | | | | 1 |
| Portugal | | | 1 | | | | 1 |
| Puerto Rico | | 1 | | | | | 1 |
| Qatar | | | 4 | | | X | 4 |
| Russia | 2 | 3 | | | X | | 5 |
| South Africa | 1 | | | | | | 1 |
| South Korea | 1 | | | | | | 1 |
| Spain | 4 | 1 | 4 | X | | X | 9 |
| Sweden | 4 | 4 | 4 | X | X | X | 12 |
| Switzerland | 1 | 2 | 4 | | | X | 7 |
| Chinese Taipei | | | 1 | | | | 1 |
| Turkey | | | 1 | | | | 1 |
| Ukraine | 1 | | 4 | | | X | 5 |
| United States | 4 | 4 | 4 | X | X | X | 12 |
| Uruguay | | | 1 | | | | 1 |
| Venezuela | | | 2 | | | | 2 |
| Zimbabwe | | 1 | | | | | 1 |
| Total: 43 NOCs | 60 | 65 | 75 | 11 | 13 | 15 | 200 |

== Timeline ==
The following is a timeline of the qualification events for the equestrian events at the 2016 Summer Olympics.

| Event | Date | Venue |
Dressage
| 2014 FEI World Equestrian Games | August 23 – September 7, 2014 | (France) Normandy |
| 2015 Pan American Games | July 11–14, 2015 | (Canada) Toronto |
| 2015 European Dressage Championships | August 11–16, 2015 | (Germany) Aachen |
| 2015 FEI Groups C/F/G qualification event | September 11, 2015 | (Germany) Perl |
| FEI ranking period | March 9, 2015 – March 6, 2016 | — |
Eventing
| 2014 FEI World Equestrian Games | August 23 – September 7, 2014 | (France) Normandy |
| 2015 Pan American Games | July 16–19, 2015 | (Canada) Toronto |
| 2015 European Eventing Championships | September 10–13, 2015 | (United Kingdom) Blair Castle |
| 2015 Asia-Pacific Eventing Championships | October 8–11, 2015 | (Netherlands) Boekelo |
| FEI ranking period | March 9, 2015 – March 6, 2016 | — |
Jumping
| 2014 FEI World Equestrian Games | August 23 – September 7, 2014 | (France) Normandy |
| 2015 FEI Group F qualification event | February 19, 2015 | (United Arab Emirates) Abu Dhabi |
| 2015 Pan American Games | July 21–25, 2015 | (Canada) Toronto |
| 2015 FEI Group C qualification event | August 2, 2015 | (Slovakia) Šamorín |
| 2015 European Show Jumping Championships | August 17–23, 2015 | (Germany) Aachen |
| 2015 FEI Group G qualification event | August 25, 2015 | (Germany) Hagen |
| FEI ranking period | January 1, 2015 – March 6, 2016 | — |

== Dressage ==
=== Team ===
| Event | Date | Venue | Vacancies | Qualified |
|---|---|---|---|---|
| Host Nation | October 2, 2009 | (Denmark) Copenhagen | 1 | Brazil |
| 2014 FEI World Equestrian Games | August 24–29, 2014 | (France) Normandy | 3 | Germany; Great Britain; Netherlands |
| 2015 European Dressage Championships Groups A/B/C | August 11–16, 2015 | (Germany) Aachen | 3 | Spain; Sweden; France |
| 2015 Pan American Games Group D/E | July 10–14, 2015 | (Canada) Toronto | 1 | United States |
| 2014 FEI World Equestrian Games Group F/G | August 24–29, 2014 | (France) Normandy | 1 | Australia |
| 2015 FEI Groups C/F/G qualification event | September 11, 2015 | (Germany) Perl | 1 | Japan |
| Composite Teams | March 6, 2016 | | 1 | Denmark |
| Total | | | 11 | |

=== Individual ===
| Event | Vacancies | Qualified |
|---|---|---|
| Team Members | 40 | |
| 2015 Pan American Games, Group D | 1 | Canada |
| 2015 Pan American Games, Group E | 1 | Mexico |
| 2015 FEI Group F qualification event | 1 | South Africa |
| 2015 FEI Group G qualification event | 1 | South Korea |
FEI Olympic Athletes Ranking – Dressage (established 6 March 2016)
| Group A (North Western Europe) | 2 | Denmark; Denmark |
| Group B (South Western Europe) | 2 | Austria; Belgium |
| Group C (Central & Eastern Europe; Central Asia) | 2 | Russia; Russia |
| Group D (North America; English Caribbean) | 1 | Canada |
| Group E (Central & South America) | 1 | Dominican Republic |
| Group F (Africa & Middle East) | 1 | Palestine |
| Group G (South East Asia, Oceania) | 1 | New Zealand |
| Additional | 6 | Italy; Ireland; Switzerland; Denmark; Denmark; Ukraine |
| Total | 60 | |

== Eventing ==
=== Team ===
| Event | Date | Venue | Vacancies | Qualified |
|---|---|---|---|---|
| Host Nation | October 2, 2009 | (Denmark) Copenhagen | 1 | Brazil |
| 2014 FEI World Equestrian Games | August 27–31, 2014 | (France) Normandy | 6 | Germany; Great Britain; Netherlands; Australia; Ireland; Canada |
| 2015 European Eventing Championships (Groups A/B/C) | September 10–13, 2015 | (United Kingdom) Blair Castle | 2 | France; Sweden |
| 2015 Pan American Games (Groups D/E) | July 16–19, 2015 | (Canada) Toronto | 1 | United States |
| 2015 Asia-Pacific Eventing Championship (Groups F/G) | October 8–11, 2015 | (Netherlands) Boekelo | 1 | New Zealand |
| Composite Teams | March 6, 2016 | | 2 | Italy; Russia; ~~Switzerland~~ |
| Total | | | 13 | |

=== Individual ===
| Event | Vacancies | Qualified |
|---|---|---|
| Team Members | 44 | |
FEI Olympic Athletes Ranking – Eventing (established 6 March 2016)
| Group A (North Western Europe) | 1 | Finland |
| Group B (South Western Europe) | 1 | Italy |
| Group C (Central & Eastern Europe; Central Asia) | 1 | Russia |
| Group D (North America; English Caribbean) | 0* | — |
| Group E (Central & South America) | 1 | Chile |
| Group F (Africa & Middle East) | 1 | Zimbabwe |
| Group G (South East Asia, Oceania) | 1 | Japan |
| Combined Groups A/B/C Ranking | 2 | ~~Belarus~~; Switzerland |
| Combined Groups D/E Ranking | 2 | Puerto Rico; Ecuador |
| Combined Groups F/G Ranking | 2 | China; Japan |
| Additional | 9 | Belgium; Belgium; Russia; Italy; Russia; Switzerland; Italy; Spain; ~~Switzerland~~; Poland; Italy |
| Total | 65 | |

* With Canada and the United States being the only nations eligible to compete in the individual eventing, no other rider from the North America and Caribbean continent is registered to Group D; thus, the unused berth has been redistributed to the next rider in the Individual Olympic Rankings.

== Jumping ==
=== Team ===
| Event | Date | Venue | Vacancies | Qualified |
|---|---|---|---|---|
| Host Nation | October 2, 2009 | (Denmark) Copenhagen | 1 | Brazil |
| 2014 FEI World Equestrian Games | September 1–7, 2014 | (France) Normandy | 5 | Netherlands |
| 2014 FEI World Equestrian Games | September 1–7, 2014 | (France) Normandy | 5 | France |
| 2014 FEI World Equestrian Games | September 1–7, 2014 | (France) Normandy | 5 | United States |
| 2014 FEI World Equestrian Games | September 1–7, 2014 | (France) Normandy | 5 | Germany |
| 2014 FEI World Equestrian Games | September 1–7, 2014 | (France) Normandy | 5 | Sweden |
| 2015 European Show Jumping Championships (Groups A/B) | August 17–23, 2015 | (Germany) Aachen | 3 | Switzerland |
| 2015 European Show Jumping Championships (Groups A/B) | August 17–23, 2015 | (Germany) Aachen | 3 | Great Britain |
| 2015 European Show Jumping Championships (Groups A/B) | August 17–23, 2015 | (Germany) Aachen | 3 | Spain |
| 2015 Pan American Games | July 21–25, 2015 | (Canada) Toronto | 2 | Canada |
| 2015 Pan American Games | July 21–25, 2015 | (Canada) Toronto | 2 | Argentina |
| 2015 FEI Group C qualification event | August 2, 2015 | (Slovakia) Šamorín | 1 | Ukraine |
| 2015 FEI Group F qualification event | February 19, 2015 | (United Arab Emirates) Abu Dhabi | 1 | Qatar |
| 2015 FEI Group G qualification event | August 25, 2015 | (Germany) Hagen | 2 | Japan |
| 2015 FEI Group G qualification event | August 25, 2015 | (Germany) Hagen | 2 | Australia |
| Total | | | 15 | |

=== Individual ===
| Event | Vacancies | Qualified |
|---|---|---|
| Team Members | 60 | |
| 2015 Pan American Games, Groups D/E | 6 | Colombia |
| 2015 Pan American Games, Groups D/E | 6 | Colombia |
| 2015 Pan American Games, Groups D/E | 6 | Peru |
| 2015 Pan American Games, Groups D/E | 6 | Uruguay |
| 2015 Pan American Games, Groups D/E | 6 | Venezuela |
| 2015 Pan American Games, Groups D/E | 6 | Venezuela |
| 2015 FEI Group G qualification event | 1 | Chinese Taipei |
FEI Olympic Athletes Ranking – Jumping (established 6 March 2016)
| Group A (North Western Europe) | 1 | Ireland |
| Group B (South Western Europe) | 1 | Portugal |
| Group C (Central & Eastern Europe; Central Asia) | 1 | Turkey |
| Group F (Africa & Middle East) | 1 | Morocco |
| Additional | 4 | Belgium |
| Additional | 4 | Italy |
| Additional | 4 | Belgium |
| Additional | 4 | Egypt |
| Total | 75 | |
