= Lauren Nicholson =

Lauren Nicholson may refer to:

- Lauren Nicholson (basketball)
- Lauren Nicholson (equestrian)
