= Rafael Lozano =

Rafael Lozano may refer to:

- Rafael Lozano-Hemmer (born 1967), Mexican-Canadian electronic artist
- Rafael Lozano (boxer, born 1970), Spanish boxer
- Rafael Lozano (boxer, born 2004), Spanish boxer, son of above boxer born 1970

== See also ==
- Rafael Losano (born 1997), Brazilian equestrian
