= Equestrian at the 2011 Pan American Games – Team eventing =

Team eventing at the 2011 Pan American Games
- Venues: Hipica Club; Santa Sofia Golf Club
- Dates: October 21–23
- Competitors: 45 from 10 nations

Medalists
| Gold medal | Lynn Symansky on Donner; Hannah Burnett on Harbour Pilot; Jack Pollard on Schoensgreen Hanni; Bruce Davidson Jr on Absolute Liberty; Shannon Lilley on Ballingowan Pizazz | United States |
| Silver medal | Selena O'Hanlon on Foxwood High; Rebecca Howard on Roquefort; Jessica Phoenix on Pavarotti; Hawley Bennett on Five O'clock Somewhere; James Atkinson on Gustav | Canada |
| Bronze medal | Jesper Martendal on Land Jimmy; Marcelo Tosi on Eleda All Black; Marcio Jorge on Josephine MCJ; Ruy Fonseca Filho on Tom Bombadill Too; Serguei Fofanoff on Barbara TW | Brazil |

The team eventing equestrian event at the 2011 Pan American Games was between October 21 and 23 at the Hipica Club (dressage and jumping competition) and the Santa Sofia Golf Club (cross country competition) in Guadalajara. The defending Pan American champion is the team from the United States.

Team eventing consisted of three phases: dressage, cross-country, and show-jumping. Scores from each phase were converted into penalty points, which were summed to give a score. Teams of up to five horse and rider pairs competed; for each team, the best three scores in each phase counted towards the team score.

In the dressage portion, the pair performed in front of three judges. The judges gave marks of between 0 and 10 for each of ten required elements; the scores for the judges were averaged to give a score between 0 and 100. That score was then subtracted from 100 and multiplied by 1.5 to give the number of penalty points.

The cross-county portion consisted of a 5.225 kilometer course with 30 efforts including 17 obstacles. The target time was nine and a half minutes; pairs received .4 penalty points for every second above that time. They also received 20 penalty points for every obstacle not cleanly jumped. Riders did not complete the course in under nineteen minutes were eliminated and given a score of 1000 penalty points.

The final phase was the show-jumping; pairs had to negotiate a course of obstacles. The pair received 4 penalty points for each obstacle at which there was a refusal or a knockdown of the obstacle. One penalty point was also assessed for each second taken above the maximum time for the course.

In addition, 1000 points are given to any rider that did not complete a competition. This includes withdrawing/not-starting (WD), retiring during the competition (RD) or being eliminated in the cross county event (EL).

The results of the team phase were also used in the individual eventing event, though that event added a second jumping phase as a final.

== Schedule ==
All times are Central Standard Time (UTC-6).

| Day | Start | Round |
|---|---|---|
| Friday October 21, 2011 | 9:00 | First session (dressage) |
| Friday October 21, 2011 | 14:00 | Second session (dressage) |
| Saturday October 22, 2011 | 11:00 | Cross country competition |
| Sunday October 23, 2011 | 12:00 | Jumping competition/Finals |

== Results ==
=== Dressage ===
| Team Rank | Nation | Individual results | | | Team Penalties |
| Team Rank | Nation | Rider | Horse | Penalties | Team Penalties |
|---|---|---|---|---|---|
| 1 | United States | Lynn Symansky | Donner | 52.20# | 138.60 |
| 1 | United States | Hannah Burnett | Harbour Pilot | 45.20 | 138.60 |
| 1 | United States | Michael Pollard | Schoensgreen Hanni | 44.50 | 138.60 |
| 1 | United States | Bruce Davidson Jr | Absolute Liberty | 48.90 | 138.60 |
| 1 | United States | Shannon Lilley | Ballingowan Pizazz | 49.30# | 138.60 |
| 2 | Canada | Selena O'Hanlon | Foxwood High | 52.20 | 147.40 |
| 2 | Canada | Rebecca Howard | Roquefort | 51.30 | 147.40 |
| 2 | Canada | Jessica Phoenix | Pavarotti | 43.90 | 147.40 |
| 2 | Canada | Hawley Bennett | Five O'clock Somewhere | 53.20# | 147.40 |
| 2 | Canada | James Atkinson | Gustav | 53.70# | 147.40 |
| 3 | Brazil | Jesper Martendal | Laid Jimmy | 65.20# | 162.70 |
| 3 | Brazil | Marcelo Tosi | Eleda All Black | 59.50 | 162.70 |
| 3 | Brazil | Marcio Jorge | Josephine MCJ | 52.80 | 162.70 |
| 3 | Brazil | Ruy Fonseca Filho | Tom Bombadill Too | 50.40 | 162.70 |
| 3 | Brazil | Serguei Fofanoff | Barabara TW | 59.80# | 162.70 |
| 4 | Chile | Jose Ibañez | Amil Fuego | 56.50 | 172.40 |
| 4 | Chile | Sergio Iturriaga | Lago Rupanco | 59.60 | 172.40 |
| 4 | Chile | Carlos Lobos | Ranco | 59.80# | 172.40 |
| 4 | Chile | Felipe Martinez | Navideño | 56.30 | 172.40 |
| 4 | Chile | Ricardo Stangher | Halesco | 62.60# | 172.40 |
| 5 | Argentina | Martin Bedoya Guido | Remonta Lanza | 65.20# | 175.90 |
| 5 | Argentina | Jose Ortelli | Jos Aladar | 57.40 | 175.90 |
| 5 | Argentina | Fernando Dominguez Silva | Almil Agresivo Z | 53.50 | 175.90 |
| 5 | Argentina | Federico Valdez Diez | Remonta Lima | 65.00 | 175.90 |
| 5 | Argentina | Marcelo Rawson | King's Elf | 65.90# | 175.90 |
| 6 | Ecuador | Ronald Zabala | Mr. Wiseguy | 52.00 | 177.40 |
| 6 | Ecuador | Gonzalo Meza | Kosovo | 63.00 | 177.40 |
| 6 | Ecuador | Carlos Narvaez | Que Loco | 62.40 | 177.40 |
| 7 | Mexico | Erik Arambula | Monterrey | 60.90 | 177.80 |
| 7 | Mexico | Abraham Ojeda | Obusero | 58.90 | 177.80 |
| 7 | Mexico | Carlos Cornejo | Prometeo Equus | 58.00 | 177.80 |
| 7 | Mexico | Gregorio Martinez | Noblesa | 65.70# | 177.80 |
| 8 | Guatemala | Carlos Sueiras | Ines | 77.80# | 179.50 |
| 8 | Guatemala | Rigoberto Aldana | Durango | 67.40# | 179.50 |
| 8 | Guatemala | Tiziana Billy | Shandon | 63.30 | 179.50 |
| 8 | Guatemala | Rita Sanz-Agero | Remonta Imperdible | 58.20 | 179.50 |
| 8 | Guatemala | Juan Pivaral | VDL Tommy | 58.00 | 179.50 |
| 9 | Venezuela | Francisco Martinez | Ser unico | 66.70 | 188.60 |
| 9 | Venezuela | Elena Ceballo | Nounours du Moulin | 56.90 | 188.60 |
| 9 | Venezuela | Novis Borges | Ritual | 65.00 | 188.60 |
| 9 | Venezuela | Carlos Silva | T Start | 71.70# | 188.60 |
| 10 | Colombia | Juan Tafur | Quinnto | 68.20 | 211.00 |
| 10 | Colombia | Mauricio Bermudez | Nankin | 73.50 | 211.00 |
| 10 | Colombia | Wilson Zarabanda | Victoriosa | 69.30 | 211.00 |
| 10 | Colombia | Alexander Lopez | Nilo | 74.30# | 211.00 |

=== Cross country ===
| Team Rank | Nation | Individual results | | | | Total Team Penalties |
| Team Rank | Nation | Rider | Horse | Cross Country Penalties | Total Penalties | Total Team Penalties |
|---|---|---|---|---|---|---|
| 1 | United States | Lynn Symansky | Donner | 0 | 52.20# | 138.60 |
| 1 | United States | Hannah Burnett | Harbour Pilot | 0 | 45.20 | 138.60 |
| 1 | United States | Jack Pollard | Schoensgreen Hanni | 0 | 44.50 | 138.60 |
| 1 | United States | Bruce Davidson Jr | Absolute Liberty | 0 | 48.90 | 138.60 |
| 1 | United States | Shannon Lilley | Ballingowan Pizazz | 0 | 49.30 | 138.60 |
| 2 | Canada | Selena O'Hanlon | Foxwood High | 20 | 72.20# | 160.50 |
| 2 | Canada | Rebecca Howard | Roquefort | 3.60 | 54.90 | 160.50 |
| 2 | Canada | Jessica Phoenix | Pavarotti | 0 | 43.90 | 160.50 |
| 2 | Canada | Hawley Bennett | Five O'clock Somewhere | 26.40 | 79.60# | 160.50 |
| 2 | Canada | James Atkinson | Gustav | 8.00 | 61.70 | 160.50 |
| 3 | Brazil | Jesper Martendal | Land Jimmy | 0 | 65.20 | 189.80 |
| 3 | Brazil | Marcelo Tosi | Eleda All Black | 34.80 | 94.30# | 189.80 |
| 3 | Brazil | Marcio Jorge | Josephine MCJ | 10.00 | 62.80 | 189.80 |
| 3 | Brazil | Ruy Fonseca Filho | Tom Bombadill Too | Eliminated | 1000.00# | 189.80 |
| 3 | Brazil | Serguei Fofanoff | Barbara TW | 2.00 | 61.80 | 189.80 |
| 4 | Argentina | Martin Bedoya Guido | Remonta Lanza | Eliminated | 1000.00# | 217.50 |
| 4 | Argentina | Jose Ortelli | Jos Aladar | 4.80 | 62.20 | 217.50 |
| 4 | Argentina | Fernando Dominguez Silva | Almil Agresivo Z | 126.00 | 179.50# | 217.50 |
| 4 | Argentina | Federico Valdez Diez | Remonta Lima | 12.80 | 77.80 | 217.50 |
| 4 | Argentina | Marcelo Rawson | King's Elf | 11.60 | 77.50 | 217.50 |
| 5 | Guatemala | Carlos Sueiras | Ines | 105.60 | 183.40 | 368.60 |
| 5 | Guatemala | Rigoberto Aldana | Durango | 3.60 | 71.00 | 368.60 |
| 5 | Guatemala | Tiziana Billy | Shandon | Eliminated | 1000.00# | 368.60 |
| 5 | Guatemala | Rita Sanz-Agero | Remonta Imperdible | 56.00 | 114.20 | 368.60 |
| 5 | Guatemala | Juan Pivaral | VDL Tommy | Eliminated | 1000.00# | 368.60 |
| 6 | Ecuador | Ronald Zabala | Mr. Wiseguy | 6.40 | 58.40 | 1141.60 |
| 6 | Ecuador | Gonzalo Meza | Kosovo | Eliminated | 1000.00 | 1141.60 |
| 6 | Ecuador | Carlos Narvaez | Que loco | 0.80 | 83.20 | 1141.60 |
| 7 | Chile | Jose Ibañez | Amil Fuego | Eliminated | 1000.00 | 1144.60 |
| 7 | Chile | Sergio Iturriaga | Lago Rupanco | 12.40 | 72.00 | 1144.60 |
| 7 | Chile | Carlos Lobos | Ranco | 12.80 | 72.60 | 1144.60 |
| 7 | Chile | Felipe Martinez | Navideño | Eliminated | 1000.00# | 1144.60 |
| 7 | Chile | Ricardo Stangher | Halesco | Eliminated | 1000.00# | 1144.60 |
| 8 | Mexico | Erik Arambula | Monterrey | 10.00 | 70.90 | 1159.70 |
| 8 | Mexico | Abraham Ojeda | Obusero | Eliminated | 1000.00 | 1159.70 |
| 8 | Mexico | Carlos Cornejo | Prometeo Equus | 10.80 | 88.80 | 1159.70 |
| 8 | Mexico | Gregorio Martinez | Noblesa | Eliminated | 1000.00# | 1159.70 |
| 9 | Venezuela | Francisco Martinez | Ser Unico | Eliminated | 1000.00 | 2056.90 |
| 9 | Venezuela | Elena Ceballo | Nounours de Moulin | 0 | 56.90 | 2056.90 |
| 9 | Venezuela | Novis Borges | Ritual | Eliminated | 1000.00 | 2056.90 |
| 9 | Venezuela | Carlos Silva | T Start | Eliminated | 1000.00# | 2056.90 |
| 10 | Colombia | Juan Tafur | Quinnto | Eliminated | 1000.00 | 2196.70 |
| 10 | Colombia | Mauricio Bermudez | Nankin | 123.10 | 196.70 | 2196.70 |
| 10 | Colombia | Wilson Zarabanda | Victoriosa | Eliminated | 1000.00 | 2196.70 |
| 10 | Colombia | Alexander Lopez | Nilo | Eliminated | 1000.00# | 2196.70 |

=== Show jumping ===
| Team Rank | Nation | Individual results | | | | Total Team Penalties |
| Team Rank | Nation | Rider | Horse | Show jumping Penalties | Total Penalties | Total Team Penalties |
|---|---|---|---|---|---|---|
| 1st place, gold medalist(s) | United States | Lynn Symansky | Donner | 0 | 52.20# | 138.60 |
| 1st place, gold medalist(s) | United States | Hannah Burnett | Harbour Pilot | 0 | 45.20 | 138.60 |
| 1st place, gold medalist(s) | United States | Jack Pollard | Schoensgreen Hanni | 0 | 44.50 | 138.60 |
| 1st place, gold medalist(s) | United States | Bruce Davidson Jr | Absolute Liberty | 0 | 48.90 | 138.60 |
| 1st place, gold medalist(s) | United States | Shannon Lilley | Ballingowan Pizazz | 0 | 49.30 | 138.60 |
| 2nd place, silver medalist(s) | Canada | Selena O'Hanlon | Foxwood High | 7 | 79.20# | 172.50 |
| 2nd place, silver medalist(s) | Canada | Rebecca Howard | Roquefort | 8 | 62.90 | 172.50 |
| 2nd place, silver medalist(s) | Canada | Jessica Phoenix | Pavarotti | 0 | 43.90 | 172.50 |
| 2nd place, silver medalist(s) | Canada | Hawley Bennett | Five O'clock Somewhere | 0 | 79.60# | 172.50 |
| 2nd place, silver medalist(s) | Canada | James Atkinson | Gustav | 4 | 65.70 | 172.50 |
| 3rd place, bronze medalist(s) | Brazil | Jesper Martendal | Land Jimmy | 16 | 81.20 | 209.80 |
| 3rd place, bronze medalist(s) | Brazil | Marcelo Tosi | Eleda All Black | 0 | 94.30# | 209.80 |
| 3rd place, bronze medalist(s) | Brazil | Marcio Jorge | Josephine MCJ | 4 | 66.80 | 209.80 |
| 3rd place, bronze medalist(s) | Brazil | Ruy Fonseca Filho | Tom Bombadill Too | Eliminated | 1000.00# | 209.80 |
| 3rd place, bronze medalist(s) | Brazil | Serguei Fofanoff | Barbara TW | 0 | 61.80 | 209.80 |
| 4 | Argentina | Martin Bedoya Guido | Remonta Lanza | Eliminated | 1000.00# | 229.50 |
| 4 | Argentina | Jose Ortelli | Jos Aladar | 12 | 74.20 | 229.50 |
| 4 | Argentina | Fernando Dominguez Silva | Almil Agresivo Z | 4 | 183.50# | 229.50 |
| 4 | Argentina | Federico Valdez Diez | Remonta Lima | 0 | 77.80 | 229.50 |
| 4 | Argentina | Marcelo Rawson | King's Elf | 0 | 77.50 | 229.50 |
| 5 | Guatemala | Carlos Sueiras | Ines | 0 | 183.40 | 372.60 |
| 5 | Guatemala | Rigoberto Aldana | Durango | 0 | 71.00 | 372.60 |
| 5 | Guatemala | Tiziana Billy | Shandon | Eliminated | 1000.00# | 372.60 |
| 5 | Guatemala | Rita Sanz-Agero | REmonta Imperdible | 4 | 118.20 | 372.60 |
| 5 | Guatemala | Juan Pivaral | VDL Tommy | Eliminated | 1000.00# | 372.60 |
| 6 | Chile | Jose Ibañez | Amil Fuego | Eliminated | 1000.00# | 1148.60 |
| 6 | Chile | Sergio Iturriaga | Lago Rupanco | 4 | 76.00 | 1148.60 |
| 6 | Chile | Carlos Lobos | Ranco | 0 | 72.60 | 1148.60 |
| 6 | Chile | Felipe Martinez | Navideño | Eliminated | 1000.00 | 1148.60 |
| 6 | Chile | Ricardo Stangher | Halesco | Eliminated | 1000.00# | 1148.60 |
| 7 | Venezuela | Francisco Martinez | Ser Unico | Eliminated | 1000.00 | 2056.90 |
| 7 | Venezuela | Elena Ceballo | Nounours du Moulin | 0 | 56.90 | 2056.90 |
| 7 | Venezuela | Novis Borges | Ritual | Eliminated | 1000.00 | 2056.90 |
| 7 | Venezuela | Carlos Silva | T Start | Eliminated | 1000.00# | 2056.90 |
| 8 | Mexico | Erik Arambula | Monterrey | 9 | 79.90 | 2079.90 |
| 8 | Mexico | Abraham Ojeda | Obusero | Eliminated | 1000.00 | 2079.90 |
| 8 | Mexico | Carlos Cornejo | Prometeo Equus | Eliminated | 1000.00 | 2079.90 |
| 8 | Mexico | Gregorio Martinez | Noblesa | Eliminated | 1000.00# | 2079.90 |
| 9 | Ecuador | Ronald Zabala | Mr Wiseguy | Eliminated | 1000.00 | 2091.20 |
| 9 | Ecuador | Gonzalo Meza | Kosovo | Eliminated | 1000.00# | 2091.20 |
| 9 | Ecuador | Carlos Narvaez | Que Loco | 8 | 91.20 | 2091.20 |
| 10 | Colombia | Juan Tafur | Quinnto | Eliminated | 1000.00 | 2208.70 |
| 10 | Colombia | Mauricio Bermudez | Nankin | 12 | 208.70 | 2208.70 |
| 10 | Colombia | Wilson Zarabanda | Victoriosa | Eliminated | 1000.00 | 2208.70 |
| 10 | Colombia | Alexander Lopez | Nilo | Eliminated | 1000.00# | 2208.70 |
