= Caroline Pamukcu =

American equestrian

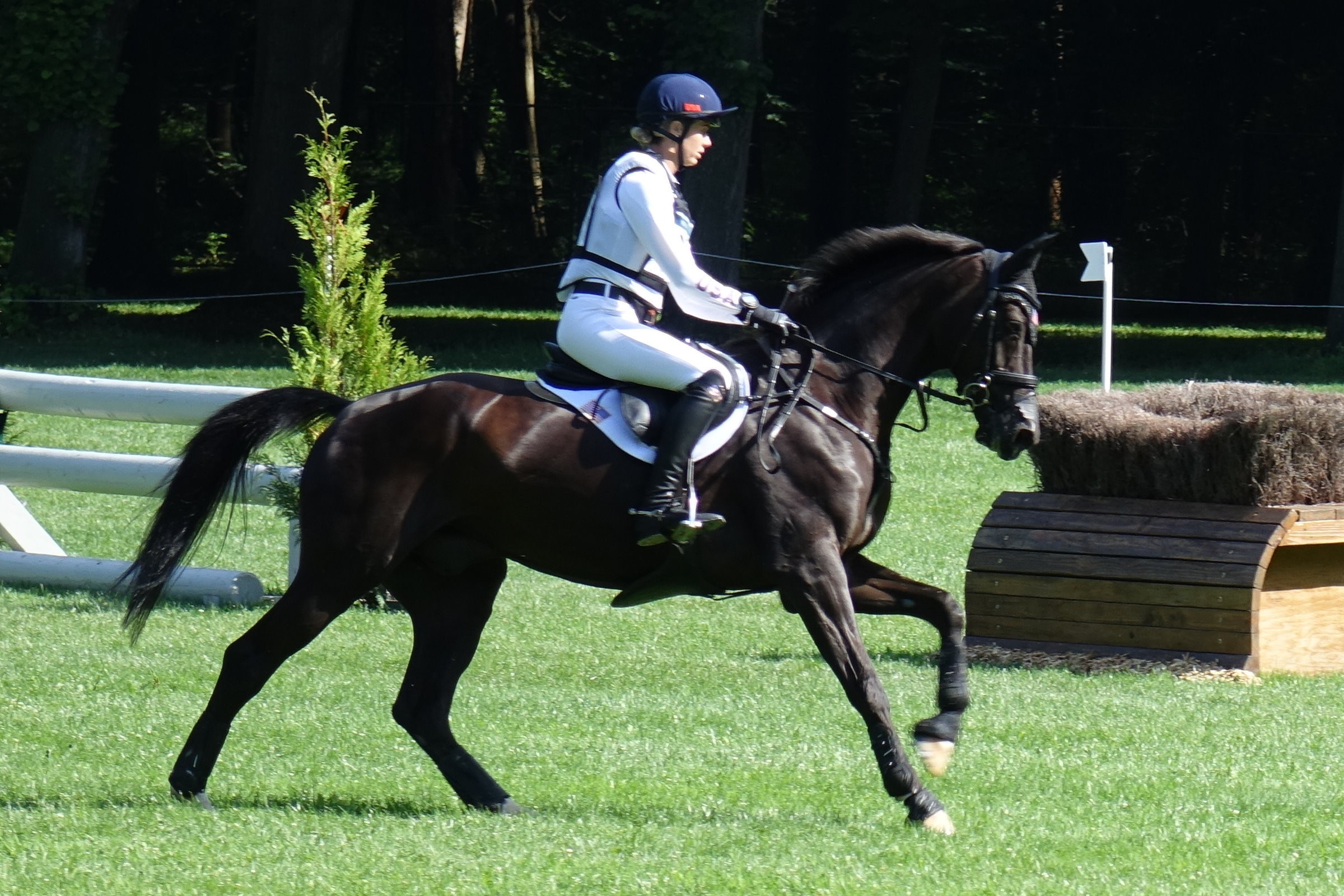
- Pamukcu in 2024

Personal information
- Other names: Caroline Martin
- Discipline: Eventing
- Born: December 8, 1994 (age 31); Springtown, Pennsylvania, U.S.
- Height: 6 ft 1 in (1.85 m)
- Horse(s): HSH Blake, Islandwood Captain Jack, Quantum Solace
Medal record
Equestrian
Representing United States
World Championships
Bronze medal – third place	2026 Aachen	Team eventing
Pan American Games
Gold medal – first place	2023 Santiago	Individual eventing
Silver medal – second place	2023 Santiago	Team eventing

Caroline Pamukcu (/pəˈmuːktʃuː/ pə-MOOK-choo; née Martin; born December 8, 1994) is an American equestrian competing in eventing. She is a Pan American Games individual gold medalist and silver team medalist. As a youth competitor, she was named United States Eventing Association Young Rider of the Year four times.

== Biography ==
Pamukcu started riding when she was four years old. She rode regularly, but not seriously in her youth. In 2002, her family bought Buckwampum Farm in Riegelsville, Pennsylvania. Her parents Sherrie and Randy Martin later invited international eventer Buck Davidson Jr. to base his business at their farm and to become Pamukcu's coach.

In 2009, while studying abroad in high school, Pamukcu stepped away from horses. Upon returning from South America, she found Quantum Solace, through Buck Davidson. The pair would go on to win an individual and team gold medal at the 2013 Adequan/FEI North American Youth Championships. The following year, Pamukcu was named to the USEF Eventing High Performance Training list as the youngest rider on the team at 17 years old.

In 2014, Pamukcu and Quantum Solace placed fifth at their first CCI3*. In 2016, Pamukcu placed 10th at the Bramham Horse Trials Under 25 CCI3* event with Quantum Solace. Later that year they made their CCI4* debut at the Kentucky Three-Day Event.

In 2017, Pamukcu was selected to receive the Karen Stives Eventing Endowment Fund Grant to support travel to Europe to compete. That year, she competed in her first CCI5* at the Kentucky Three-Day Event with Spring Easy, and represented the United States in the FEI Eventing Nations Cup at Houghton Hall on Pebbly Maximus. She later competed in the Bramham CCI4*-L, securing top 10 finishes with Pebbly Maximus and The Apprentice.

In December 2018, Pamukcu started working for horse dealers Emil Spadone and Paul Hendrix. She later partnered with Spadone and Hendrix to start her own horse sales business.

Since turning professional, Pamukcu has had international placings at events including Aachen CCIO4*-S (Germany), Millstreet CCI4*-L (Ireland), Blair Castle CCI4*-S (England), Strzegom CCIO4*-S (Poland), and Mondial Du Lion World Breeding Championships (France).

In 2020, Pamuku's business partner Kelley Hutchinson found Irish Sport Horse HSH Blake as a prospect for their sales business. After being initially unable to sell him, Pamukcu and HSH Blake's competition success encouraged Pamukcu to find a buyer that would allow her to continue to ride and develop the horse.

In 2022, Pamukcu moved to the United Kingdom to train with Pippa Funnell.

In 2023, Pamukcu and HSH Blake were named to the U.S. Eventing team for the Pan American Games in Santiago, Chile. Representing the United States, they placed first overall, winning the individual gold medal. The pair was later named to the U.S. eventing team for the 2024 Summer Olympics in Paris, France.
