= Equestrian events at the 2019 Pan American Games =

- Equestrian pictogram
- Venue: Equestrian stadium
- Dates: July 27 – August 10, 2019
- No. of events: 6 (6 open)
- Competitors: 150 from 20 nations

Equestrian competitions at the 2019 Pan American Games in Lima, Peru were held from July 27 to August 10. The venue for the competition is the Equestrian Club Militar La Molina. A total of 150 athletes are scheduled to compete in the three disciplines of dressage, eventing and jumping, each with an individual and team event.

All three disciplines served as qualifiers for the 2020 Summer Olympics in Tokyo, Japan.

== Medal table ==
Rank	Nation	Gold	Silver	Bronze	Total
1	United States	3	2	3	8
2	Brazil	2	1	2	5
3	Canada	1	1	1	3
4	Argentina	0	1	0	1
4	Mexico	0	1	0	1
Totals (5 entries)		6	6	6	18

== Medalists ==
Event	Gold	Silver	Bronze
Individual dressage	Sarah Lockman on First Apple; United States	Tina Irwin on Laurencio; Canada	Jennifer Baumert on Handsome; United States
Team dressage	Canada; Jill Irving on Degas 12; Tina Irwin on Laurencio; Lindsay Kellock on Floratina; Naïma Moreira-Laliberté on Statesman	United States; Nora Batchelder on Faro SQF; Jennifer Baumert on Handsome; Sarah Lockman on First Apple	Brazil; Leandro Silva on Dicaprio; João dos Santos on Carthago Comando SN; João Oliva on Biso das Lezirias; Pedro Almeida on Aoleo
Individual eventing	Boyd Martin on Tsetserleg; United States	Lynn Symansky on RF Cool Play; United States	Carlos Parro on Quaikin Qurious; Brazil
Team eventing	United States; Lynn Symansky on RF Cool Play; Tamie Smith on Mai Baum; Doug Payne on Starr Witness; Boyd Martin on Tsetserleg	Brazil; Ruy Fonseca on Ballypatrick SRS; Rafael Losano on Fuiloda G Marcelo Tosi on Starbucks; Carlos Parro on Quaikin Qurious	Canada; Karl Slezak on Fernhill Wishes; Dana Cooke on Mississippi; Colleen Loach on Golden Eye; Jessica Phoenix on Pavarotti
Individual jumping	Marlon Zanotelli on Sirene de la Motte; Brazil	José María Larocca on Finn Lente; Argentina	Beezie Madden on Breitling LS; United States
Team jumping	Brazil; Marlon Zanotelli on Sirene de la Motte; Eduardo Menezes on H5 Chaganus; Rodrigo Lambre on Chacciama; Pedro Veniss on Quabri de'l Isle	Mexico; Enrique González on Chacna; Eugenio Garza on Armani SL Z Lorenza O'Farrill on Queens Darling; Patricio Pasquel on Babel	United States; Alex Granato on Carlchen W Lucy Deslauriers on Hester; Eve Jobs on Venus d'Fees des Hazalles; Beezie Madden on Breitling LS

== Qualification ==
A quota of 150 equestrian riders (48 dressage, 48 eventing and 54 show jumping) will be allowed to qualify. A maximum of 12 athletes can compete for a nation across all events (with a maximum of four per discipline). Athletes qualified through various qualifying events and rankings.

== See also ==
- Equestrian events at the 2020 Summer Olympics
