= Equestrian at the 2023 Pan American Games – Team eventing =

Individual team at the 2023 Pan American Games
- Venue: Granaderos Regiment Equestrian School
- Dates: October 27 - October 29
- Competitors: 32 from 8 nations
- Winning score: 115.6

Medalists
Gold medal	Michael Winter on El Mundo; Colleen Leachon Fe Golden Eye; Lindsay Traisnel on Bacyrouge; Karl Slezak on Hot Bobo	Canada
Silver medal	Sydney Elliott on Qc Diamantaire; Sharon White on Claus 63; Caroline Pamukcu on HSH Blake; Elisabeth Halliday on Miks Master C	United States
Bronze medal	Ruy Fonseca on Ballypatrick SRS; Carlos Parro on Safira; Rafael Losano on Withington; Márcio Jorge on Castle Howard Casanova	Brazil

The individual team competition of the equestrian events at the 2023 Pan American Games was held from October 27 to 29 at the Granaderos Regiment Equestrian School (Escuela de Equitación Regimiento Granaderos) in Quillota, Chile.

== Schedule ==
Date	Time	Round
October 27, 2023	11:00	Dressage
October 28, 2023	11:00	Cross Country
October 29, 2023	12:00	Show Jumping

== Results ==
The results were as follows:

Rank	Nation	Name	Horse	Dressage			Cross country			Jumping			Total	
Rank	Nation	Name	Horse	Individual	Team	Rank	Individual	Team	Rank	Individual	Team	Rank	Individual	Team
1st place, gold medalist(s)	Michael Winter; Colleen Leach; Lindsay Traisnel; Karl Slezak	Canada	El Mundo; Fe Golden Eye; Bacyrouge; Hot Bobo	32.2; 28.6; 32.6; 32.7	93.5	2	7.6; 13.2; 0.0; 0.0	105.2	3	0.8; 0.0; 1.6; 8.0	115.6	1	40.7; 41.8; 34.2; 40.7	115.6
2nd place, silver medalist(s)	Sydney Elliott; Sharon White; Caroline Pamukcu; Elisabeth Halliday	United States	Qc Diamantaire; Claus 63; HSH Blake; Miks Master C	33.3; 28.2; 26.8; 24.8	79.8	1	0.0; 2.4; 0.0; 4.0	86.2	1	9.2; 16.4; 4.0; 13.6	115.7	2	42.5; 47.0; 30.8; 42.4	115.7
3rd place, bronze medalist(s)	Ruy Fonseca; Carlos Parro; Rafael Losano; Márcio Jorge	Brazil	Ballypatrick SRS; Safira; Withington; Castle Howard Casanova	36.7; 34.0; 36.1; 29.8	99.9	3	10.6; 0.0; 0.0; 1.6	101.5	2	0.4; 16.0; 8.8; 0.8	127.1	3	56.7; 50.0; 44.9; 32.2	127.1
4	José Mercado Suarez; Luis Santiago Franco; Eduardo Rivero Fragoso; Fernando Parroquin Delfin	Mexico	Balanca SDN; Egipcio II	46.4; 36.4; 39.9; 32.9	109.2	4	31.6; 50.6; 22.8; 26.4	209.0	5	11.2; 12.8; 26.0; 5.2	253.0	4	139.2; 99.8; 88.7; 64.5	253.0
5	Juan Carlos Candisano; Juan Benitez Gallardo; Marcelo Javier Rawson; Luciano Claudio Brunello	Argentina	Remonta Urmelia; Chaman Ginn; Baral Villester; Cash des Cedres	39.1; 45.1; 45.3; 46.1	129.5	6	EL; 16.0; 23.3; 18.4	194.1	4	10.4; 12.8; 36.8	254.1	5	71.5; 81.3; 101.3	254.1
6	Federico Daners Bidegain; Rufino Dominguez Midon; Gastón Marcenal; Edison Quintana Valerio	Uruguay	Demitasse; SVR Edecan de la Luz; SVR Indy; SVR Fraile del Santa Lucía	38.7; 55.9; 48.1; 38.3	125.1	5	53.6; 37.6; EL; EL	1185.8	7	24.8; 30.0	1240.6	6	117.7; 123.5	1240.6
7	Nicolás Fuentes Escala; Nicolás Ibañez; Guillermo Garín Heyermann; Jaime Bittner Martínez	Chile	Midnight; Domingo; HSB Sidonia; All Red	45.0; 42.1; 45.2; 42.4	129.5	6	36.4; EL; EL; 38.0	1185.8	7	52.0; 51.2	1265.0	7	133.4; 131.6	1265.0
8	Andrés Gómez; Juan Tafur; Mauricio Bermúdez; Lucero Desrochers	Colombia	Caroline; Blue Moon; Vardags Saratoga; Gama Castellon	51.5; 40.8; 49.5; 41.5	131.8	8	EL; EL; 31.6; EL	2081.1	8	22.4	2103.5	8	22.4	2103.5
