= Jessica Phoenix =

Canadian equestrian

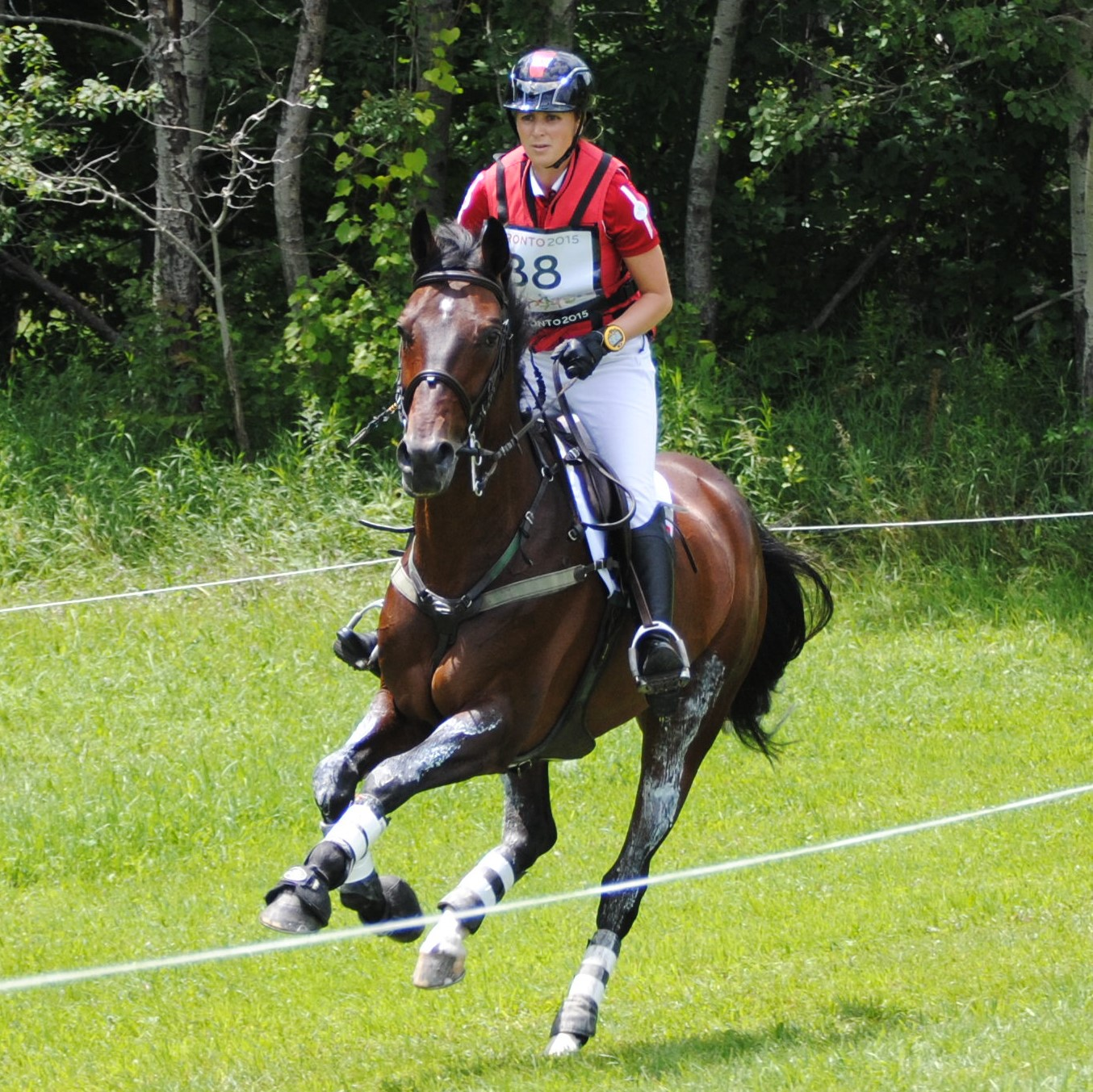
- Phoenix and Pavarotti at the 2015 Pan Am Games

Personal information
- Discipline: Eventing
- Born: October 16, 1983 (age 42); Uxbridge, Ontario, Canada
- Height: 157 cm (5 ft 2 in)
Medal record
Equestrian
Representing Canada
Pan American Games
Gold medal – first place	2011 Guadalajara	Individual eventing
Silver medal – second place	2011 Guadalajara	Team eventing
Silver medal – second place	2015 Toronto	Individual eventing
Bronze medal – third place	2015 Toronto	Team eventing
Bronze medal – third place	2019 Lima	Team eventing

Jessica Phoenix (born October 16, 1983 in Uxbridge, Ontario) is a Canadian Equestrian Team athlete in eventing.

== Career ==
Phoenix won a gold medal in the individual eventing competition at the 2011 Pan American Games in Guadalajara. She also won a silver medal as part of the team eventing competition.

Phoenix made her Olympic debut at the 2012 Olympic Games in London, finishing 22nd in individual eventing.

Phoenix competed at her third Pan American Games in 2015. Once again she returned home with two medals, an individual silver and a team bronze. She rode a Westphalian gelding Pavarotti.

In July 2016, she was named to Canada's Olympic team. At the Games held in Rio de Janeiro, Brazil, Phoenix placed 10th in the team competition and finished 38th individually, collecting 131.60 penalties across the three stages with A Little Romance.

== CCI***** results ==
Results
Event	Kentucky	Badminton	Luhmühlen	Burghley	Pau	Adelaide
2011	7th (Exponential); RET (Exploring)			35th (Exponential)		
2012	Did not participate					
2013	WD (Exponential)					
2014	WD (Pavarotti)					
2015	EL (A Little Romance); WD (Pavarotti)					
2016	WD (Pavarotti); WD (Abbey GS); WD (A Little Romance)					
2017	17th (Pavarotti); RET (Bentley's Best); RET (A Little Romance)					
2018	Did not participate					
2019	15th (Bogue Sound)					
EL = Eliminated; RET = Retired; WD = Withdrew

== International championship results ==
Results
Year	Event	Horse	Placing	Notes
2007	Pan American Games	Exploring	12th	Individual
2010	World Equestrian Games	Exponential	WD	Individual
2011	Pan American Games	Pavarotti	2nd place, silver medalist(s)	Team
2011	Pan American Games	Pavarotti	1st place, gold medalist(s)	Individual
2012	Olympic Games	Exponential	13th	Team
2012	Olympic Games	Exponential	22nd	Individual
2014	World Equestrian Games	Pavarotti	6th	Team
2014	World Equestrian Games	Pavarotti	28th	Individual
2015	Pan American Games	Pavarotti	3rd place, bronze medalist(s)	Team
2015	Pan American Games	Pavarotti	2nd place, silver medalist(s)	Individual
2016	Olympic Games	A Little Romance	10th	Team
2016	Olympic Games	A Little Romance	38th	Individual
2018	World Equestrian Games	Pavarotti	11th	Team
2018	World Equestrian Games	Pavarotti	EL	Individual
2019	Pan American Games	Pavarotti	3rd place, bronze medalist(s)	Team
2019	Pan American Games	Pavarotti	5th	Individual
EL = Eliminated; RET = Retired; WD = Withdrew

== Honours ==
In 2012 Phoenix was awarded the Queen Elizabeth II Diamond Jubilee Medal.
