= Marcelo Tosi =

Brazilian equestrian

Pedro de Almeida
Personal information
- Born: August 14, 1969 (age 56) Piracicaba, Brazil
Medal record
Equestrian
Representing Brazil
Pan American Games
| Silver medal – second place | 1999 Winnipeg | Team eventing |
| Silver medal – second place | 2019 Lima | Team eventing |
| Bronze medal – third place | 2011 Guadalajara | Team eventing |

Marcelo Tosi (born 14 August 1969) is a Brazilian equestrian. At the 2012 Summer Olympics he competed in the individual and team eventing. He competed at the 2020 Summer Olympics.
