= Marlon Zanotelli =

Brazilian equestrian

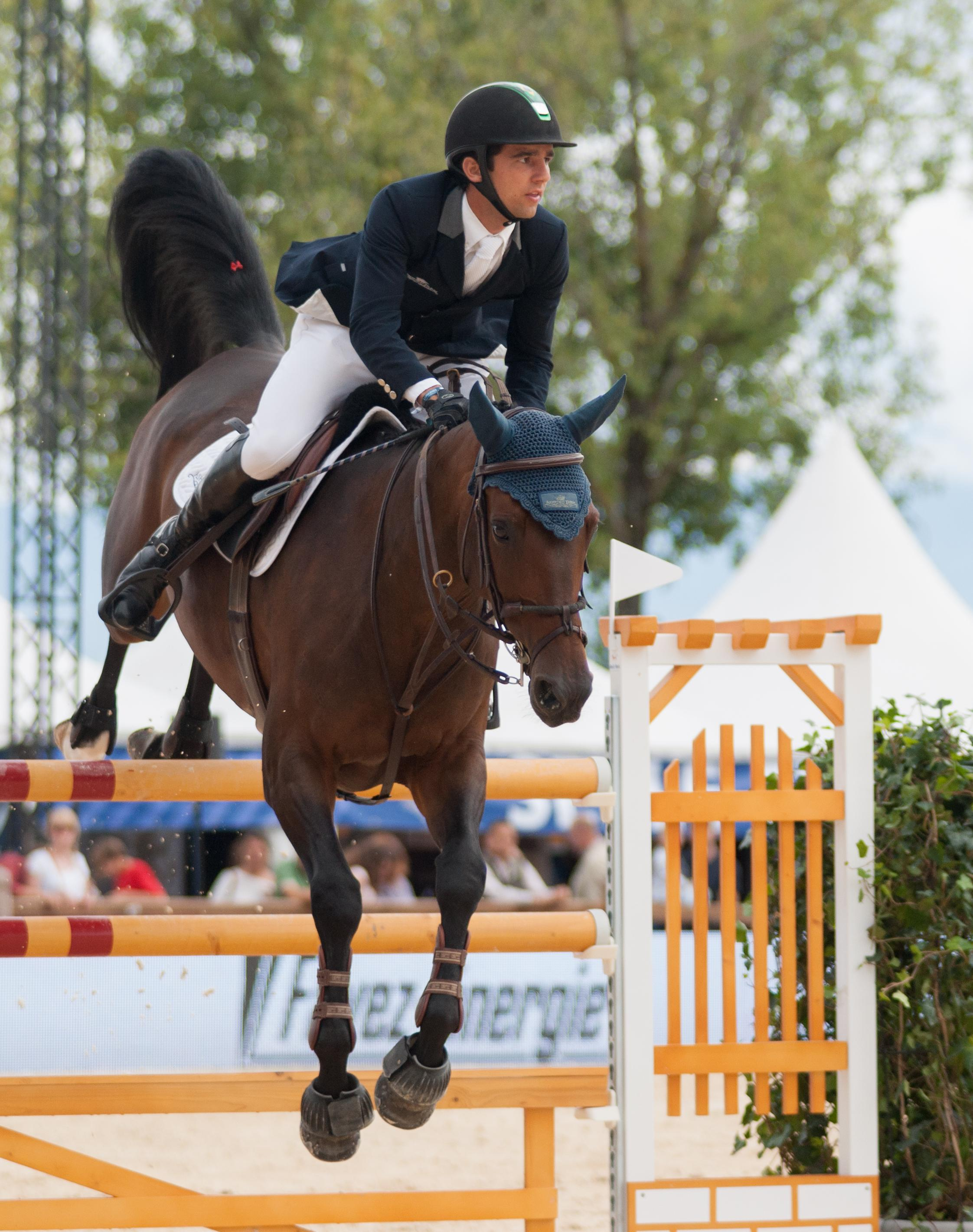
- Zanotelli & Madame Butterfly in 2013

Personal information
- Born: 19 June 1988 (age 38) Imperatriz, Brazil

Sport
- Sport: Equestrian
Medal record
Equestrian
Representing Brazil
Pan American Games
| Gold medal – first place | 2019 Lima | Individual jumping |
| Gold medal – first place | 2019 Lima | Team jumping |
| Bronze medal – third place | 2023 Santiago | Team jumping |

Marlon Zanotelli (born 19 June 1988) is a Brazilian equestrian. He competed in the individual jumping event at the 2020 Summer Olympics.
