= Selena O'Hanlon =

Canadian equestrian

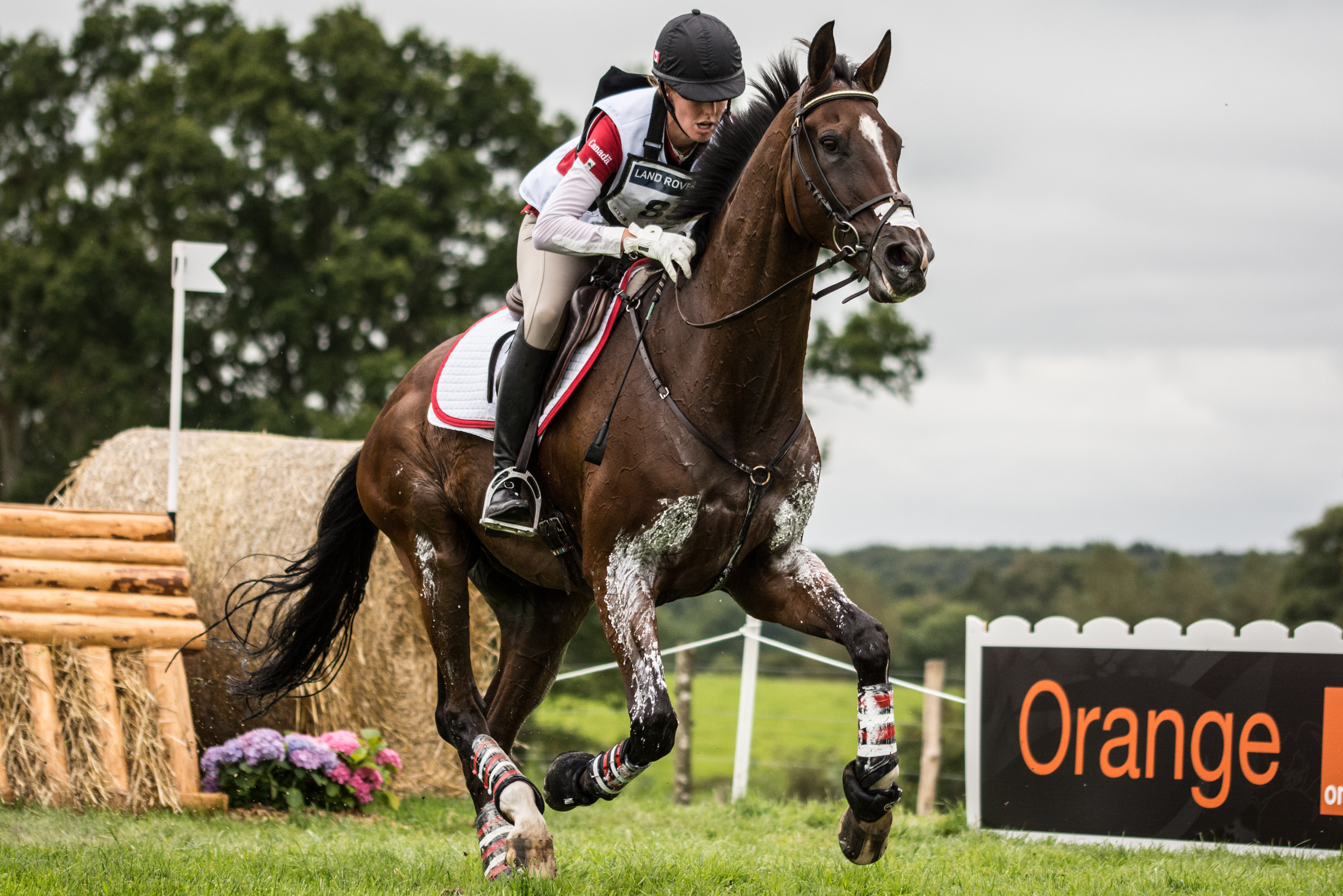

Personal information
- Nationality: Canadian
- Discipline: Eventing
- Born: March 21, 1981 (age 45); Salisbury, England
Medal record
Equestrian
Representing Canada
World Championships
Silver medal – second place	2010 Kentucky	Team eventing
Pan American Games
Silver medal – second place	2011 Guadalajara	Team eventing

Selena O'Hanlon (born March 21, 1981) is a Canadian equestrian who competes in the sport of eventing.

== Olympics ==
O'Hanlon competed at the 2008 Summer Olympics in Beijing, finishing 45th in the individual event and 9th in the team event.

In July 2016, she was named to Canada's Olympic team. However on July 29 she was withdrawn from her team due to an injury to her horse Foxwood High.
