= Mighty Nice =

- Breed: Irish Sport Horse
- Sex: Gelding
- Foaled: 2004
- Owner: HND Group
- Trainer: Phillip Dutton

Major wins
- Individual bronze in eventing in 2016 Olympic Games

Mighty Nice is an Irish Sport Horse gelding ridden in the sport of eventing by Phillip Dutton. Dutton and Mighty Nice won a bronze medal in the 2016 Summer Olympics.

== Life and career ==
Mighty Nice is an Irish Sport Horse gelding foaled in 2004. He is owned by HND Group and ridden by Australian-born equestrian Phillip Dutton, who competes for the United States. Dutton and Mighty Nice won a bronze individual medal in eventing during the 2016 Olympic Games in Rio de Janeiro, Brazil.
