= Márcio Jorge =

Brazilian equestrian (born 1975)

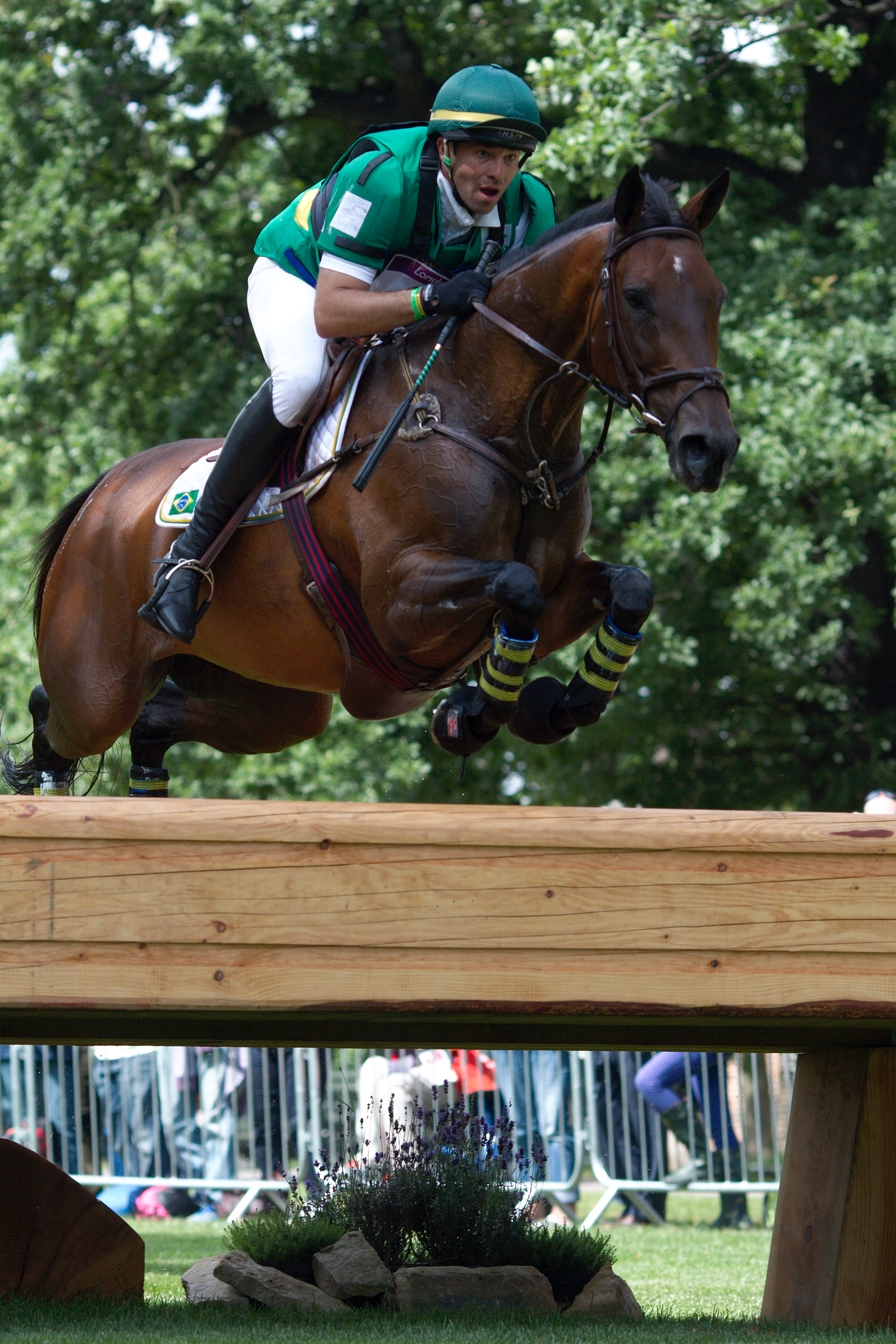
- Jorge and Josephine competing at the 2012 Summer Olympics in London

Personal information
- Full name: Márcio Carvalho Jorge
- Born: 28 January 1975 (age 51) Colina, São Paulo, Brazil
- Height: 186 cm (6 ft 1 in)
Medal record
Equestrian
Representing Brazil
Pan American Games
Silver medal – second place	2015 Toronto	Team eventing
Silver medal – second place	2023 Santiago	Individual eventing
Bronze medal – third place	2011 Guadalajara	Team eventing
Bronze medal – third place	2023 Santiago	Team eventing
South American Championships
Gold medal – first place	2014 Barretos	Team eventing

Márcio Carvalho Jorge (born 28 January 1975 in Colina, São Paulo, Brazil) is a Brazilian Olympic eventing rider. He competed at two Summer Olympics (in 2012 and 2016). He finished 7th in team eventing in 2016. Meanwhile, his best individual Olympic placement is 25th place from the same Games.

Jorge also participated at two Pan American Games (in 2011 and 2015). He won a team silver in 2015 and a team bronze in 2011.

And he also participated at two Badminton in 2014 he came 23rd with Josephine MCJ. Badminton in 2017 he came 30th with Lissy Mac Wayer.

Jorge participated in two World Games ( in 1998 and 2018 ) 1998 Rome WEG he came 9th with Arabesco. 2018 Tryon USA WEG he came 32nd with Coronel MCJ.

== Notable Horses ==
- Josephine MCJ – 2003 Bay Brazilian Horse Mare (Potassium XX x El Bacancito)
  - 2011 Pan American Games – Team Bronze Medal, Individual Ninth Place
  - 2012 London Olympics – Team Ninth Place, Individual 46th Place
- Lissy Mac Wayer – 2003 Seal Brown Westfalen Mare (Laomedon x Pik Labionics)
  - 2015 Pan American Games – Team Silver Medal, Individual Ninth Place
  - 2016 Rio Olympics – Team Seventh Place, Individual 25th Place
- Capri HCR – 2007 Chestnut Brazilian Horse Mare (Chester Z x Be My Chief XX)
  - 2017 FEI Eventing Young Horse World Championships – 28th Place
