= Marilyn Little =

American equestrian

Personal information
- Discipline: Eventing, Show jumping
- Born: December 1, 1981 (age 44)
Medal record
Equestrian
Representing United States
Pan American Games
Gold medal – first place	2015 Toronto	Individual eventing
Gold medal – first place	2015 Toronto	Team eventing

Marilyn Little (born December 1, 1981) is an American show jumping and eventing rider. Little won both individual and team gold medals in eventing at the 2015 Pan American Games in Toronto, riding RF Scandalous. After returning to international show jumping, she was named in June 2026 to the United States team for the FEI Jumping World Championships in Aachen. As of July 2026, she is ranked 31st in the Longines jumping world rankings, the highest position of her career.

== Eventing career ==
Little began her career as a grand prix show jumper before shifting her focus to eventing in 2011, developing a string of event horses carrying the "RF" prefix. She reached a career-best fourth place in the FEI World Eventing Athlete Rankings in April 2014.

In September 2018, Little was selected for the United States team for the 2018 FEI World Equestrian Games in Tryon, but withdrew RF Scandalous days before the start of competition after the mare sustained a minor leg injury in training; Will Coleman was called up in her place.

At the 2021 Kentucky Three-Day Event, Little and RF Scandalous led the CCI5*-L after dressage on a score of 21.7, the best at the event since 2009, before dropping down the leaderboard with a clear but slow cross-country round. She has not started in an international eventing competition since 2021.

== Return to show jumping ==
Little subsequently returned to show jumping. In February 2025, she won the $62,500 CSI2* Grand Prix at the Winter Equestrian Festival in Wellington riding Olympic van de Noordheuvel. In July 2025, riding the mare La Contessa, she was part of the winning U.S. team in the FEI Jumping Nations Cup at the Caledon CSIO3* in Canada and won the $90,000 Grand Prix of Caledon.

In February 2026, Little and La Contessa jumped double clear rounds to help the United States win the $150,000 FEI Jumping Nations Cup at the Wellington CSIO4*, one of only seven combinations to go clear in both rounds. In June 2026, the pair represented the United States in the FEI Jumping Nations Cup at Rome's Piazza di Siena CSIO5* and finished fourth in the Rolex Grand Prix of Rome, during a run of 18 consecutive placings between July 2025 and May 2026. On June 26, 2026, she was named to the U.S. team for the 2026 FEI Jumping World Championships in Aachen, Germany, alongside Katie Dinan, Lillie Keenan, Laura Kraut and McLain Ward.

== Honours and awards ==
Little's honours include the Maxine Beard Show Jumping Developing Rider Award from the United States Equestrian Team (USET) Foundation (2000), the United States Eventing Association's Leading Woman Rider of the Year title (2014), a Karen E. Stives Endowment Fund grant for high-performance eventing from the USET Foundation (2014), the Maryland Horse Board's Touch of Class Award in recognition of her Pan American Games gold medals (2015), and the USET Foundation's Pinnacle Cup Trophy (2018).

== Results ==
=== Show jumping ===
Year	Event	Horse	Placing
2025	CSI2* Grand Prix, Winter Equestrian Festival, Wellington	Olympic van de Noordheuvel	1st
2025	FEI Jumping Nations Cup, Caledon CSIO3* (team)	La Contessa	1st
2025	Grand Prix of Caledon CSIO3*	La Contessa	1st
2026	FEI Jumping Nations Cup, Wellington CSIO4* (team)	La Contessa	1st
2026	FEI Jumping Nations Cup, Rome CSIO5* (team)	La Contessa	7th
2026	Rolex Grand Prix of Rome CSIO5*	La Contessa	4th
2026	CSI4* Grand Prix, Valkenswaard	Heidi Von Imhoff	9th

=== Eventing: CCI 4* ===
Results
Event	Kentucky	Badminton	Luhmühlen	Burghley	Pau	Adelaide
2012	9th (RF Demeter) WD (RF Rovano Rex)					
2013	EL (RF Demeter)		7th (RF Demeter)		18th (RF Demeter)	
2014	5th (RF Smoke on the Water) 6th (RF Demeter)			20th (RF Demeter)		
2015	RET (RF Demeter)					
2016	EL (RF Demeter)					
2017			4th (RF Scandalous)			
2018	(bronze) (RF Scandalous)					
EL = Eliminated; RET = Retired; WD = Withdrew
