= Rafael Losano =

Brazilian equestrian

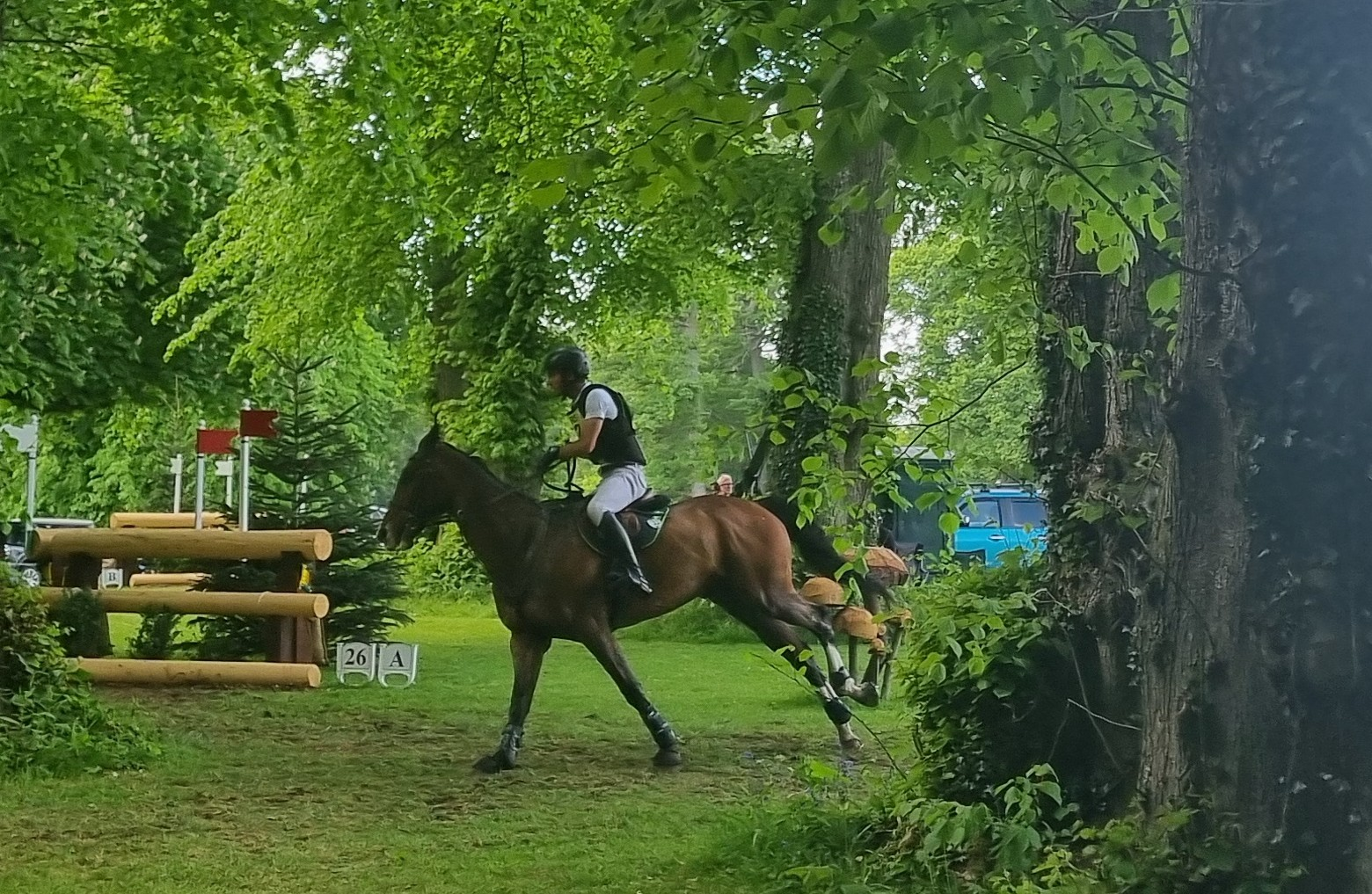
- Losano at the Badminton Horse Trials 2025

Personal information
- Full name: Rafael Mamprin Losano
- Discipline: Eventing
- Born: 10 October 1997 (age 28); Rio Claro, São Paulo, Brazil
- Height: 184 cm (6 ft 0 in)
Medal record
Equestrian
Representing Brazil
Pan American Games
Silver medal – second place	2019 Lima	Team eventing
Bronze medal – third place	2023 Santiago	Team eventing

Rafael Mamprin Losano (Note: This name uses Portuguese naming customs: the first or maternal family name is Mamprin and the second or paternal family name is Losano.) (born 10 October 1997) is a Brazilian equestrian. He competed in the individual eventing at the 2020 Summer Olympics.

== See also ==
- Rafael Lozano (disambiguation), various people with a similar name
