= Boyd Martin =

American equestrian

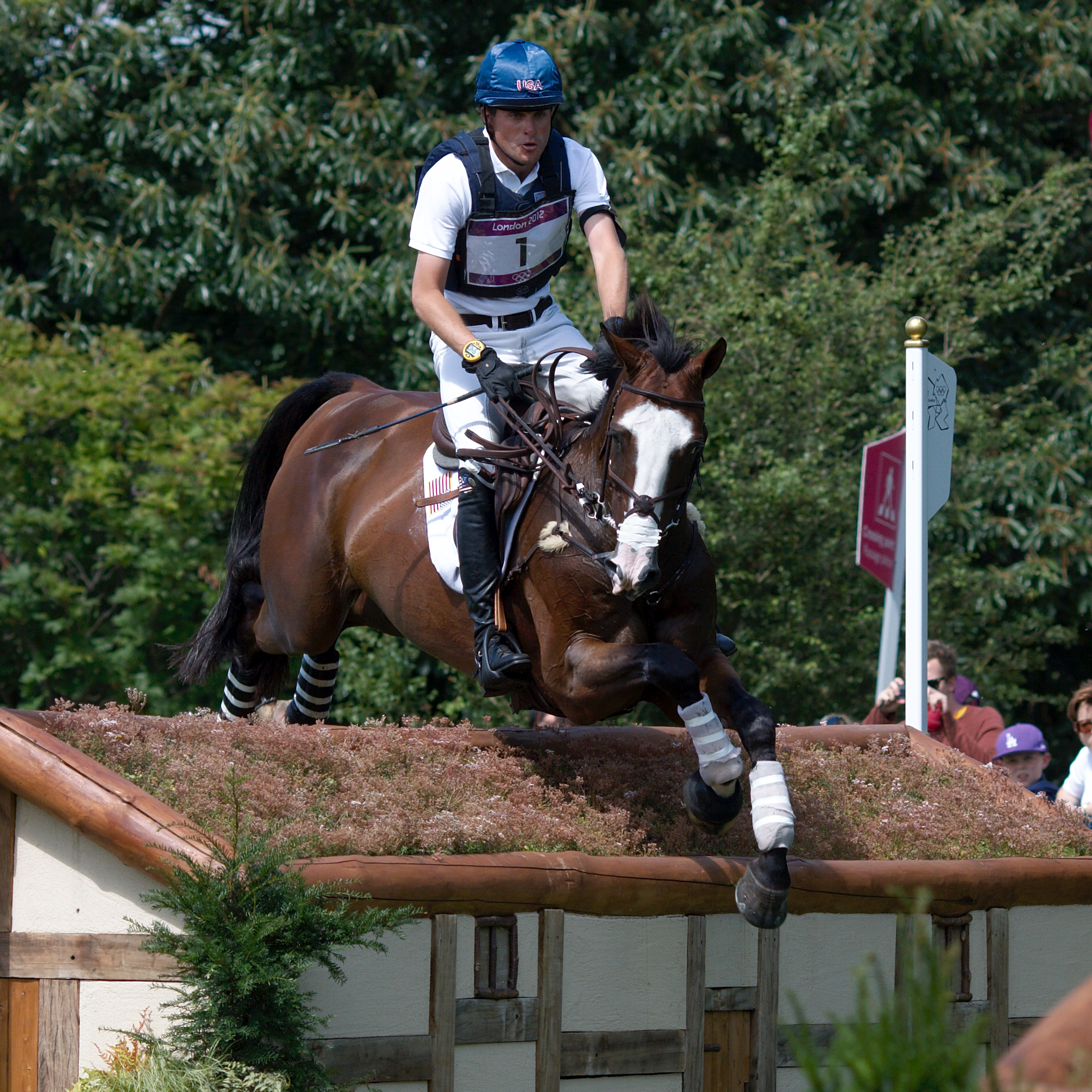
- Martin at the 2012 Summer Olympics

Personal information
- Born: August 20, 1979 (age 47)
Medal record
Equestrian
Representing the United States
World Championships
Silver medal – second place	2022 Pratoni	Team eventing
Bronze medal – third place	2026 Aachen	Team eventing
Pan American Games
Gold medal – first place	2015 Toronto	Team eventing
Gold medal – first place	2019 Lima	Individual eventing
Gold medal – first place	2019 Lima	Team eventing

Boyd Martin (born August 20, 1979) is an Australian-born American equestrian competing in the discipline of eventing. He has participated in four consecutive Summer Olympic Games (in 2012, 2016, 2020, and 2024) and is a two-time Pan American Games team gold medalist and individual gold medalist. He is a two-time CCI5*-L winner.

== Biography ==
Olympic three-day event rider Boyd Martin was born to Toy Dorgan, an American speed skater, and Ross Martin, an Australian cross-country skier. His parents met at the 1968 Winter Olympics in Grenoble, France. Martin and his sister Brook were raised in Terrey Hills, New South Wales, on the outskirts of Sydney. Boyd started his riding career at the Forrest Hills Pony Club with a pony named Willy.

After high school, he lived at Heath and Rozzie Ryan's Newcastle Equestrian Centre for eight years, first as a working student and later running his own business. During this time, Boyd represented Australia at the Young Rider level against New Zealand on a Trans-Tasman three-day event on Brady Bunch and won the last long-format four-star event at the 2003 Adelaide CCI4* riding True Blue Toozac. He was long listed for the Australian Eventing Team for the Summer Olympics in 2000, 2004, and 2008.

In 2006, Martin traveled to the United States to compete at the Rolex Kentucky CCI4* riding Ying Yang Yo. He and his wife, Silva, later returned a year later to the U.S. to try to compete internationally. For the first three years there, Martin worked as an assistant to Phillip Dutton. In 2010, Silva and Boyd started their own business, Windurra USA. The Martins own a farm in Cochranville, Pennsylvania; during the winters, they are based in Aiken, South Carolina.

=== International competition ===
In 2009, Martin began representing the United States in international competition. He purchased his horse, Neville Bardos, for $850; Neville had been rescued from the racetrack by another trainer. Martin experienced a barn fire and several personal tragedies in 2011. Martin and Neville finished 7th at the Burghley CCI4* (England). Neville Bardos was named the 2011 International Horse of the Year by the USEF, and The Chronicle of the Horse named Martin its 2011 Overall Rider of the Year. They were featured on the cover page of The New York Times.

Martin was placed 10th at the 2010 World Equestrian Games in Lexington, Kentucky, riding Neville Bardos; 7th at the 2014 World Equestrian Games in Normandy, France, riding Shamwari 4; and was a member of the U.S. Olympic Eventing Team in London in 2012, riding Otis Barbotiere. In 2015, he placed 4th individually and was a member of the U.S. team at the Pan American Games in Toronto riding Pancho Villa. The following year, Boyd competed at his second Olympics in Rio de Janeiro, Brazil, riding Thoroughbred Blackfoot Mystery. He placed 16th individually and was the second highest placed U.S. athlete.

As of 2021, he has competed in three Olympic Games (Tokyo 2020, Rio 2016, London 2012), two World Equestrian Games (Tryon 2018, Normandy 2014), two Pan American Games (Lima 2019, Toronto 2015), and has made appearances on numerous teams for the U.S. In 2021, Martin won the Maryland 5 Star CCI5*-L with On Cue. He also finished 4th aboard On Cue at the 2021 Land Rover Kentucky Three-Day Eventing CCI5*-L before finishing inside the top twenty aboard Tsetserleg TSF at the Tokyo 2020 Olympic Games. In 2022, Martin was selected to compete on the US Eventing Team for the FEI Eventing World Championships held in Pratoni del Vivaro, Italy. Aboard Tsetserleg TSF, Martin and the team won the silver medal, earning the team's qualification to the 2024 Olympic Games.

Outside of equestrianism, Boyd is a fan of boxing, MMA and hockey.

== CCI5*-L results ==
Results
Event	Kentucky	Maryland	Badminton	Luhmühlen	Burghley	Pau	Adelaide
2000							5th (Flying Doctor)
2001							17th (Flying Doctor); 18th (Starkey)
2002							5th (X-Treme)
2003							(gold) (True Blue Toozac); 18th (Brady Bunch)
2005							8th (Orchard End Winston)
2006	11th (Ying Yang Yo)						
2008	9th (Neville Bardos); EL (Ying Yang Yo)						
2010	4th (Neville Bardos); 11th (Rock On Rose); 12th (Remington XXV)					7th (Remington XXV)	
2011	7th (Remington XXV)				7th (Neville Bardos)		
2012	(bronze) (Otis Barbotiere); 8th (Remington XXV)			RET (Ying Yang Yo)			
2013	RET (Trading Aces)						
2014				(bronze) (Shamwari IV); 15th (Otis Barbotiere)			
2015	7th (Master Frisky); 25th (Cracker Jack)						
2016	6th (Blackfoot Mystery); 12th (Shamwari IV); 42nd (Steady Eddie)		EL (Cracker Jack)	10th (Cracker Jack)		13th (Welcome Shadow); EL (Cracker Jack)	
2017	7th (Cracker Jack); RET (Steady Eddie)				10th (Steady Eddie)	RET (Cracker Jack)	
2018	11th (Tsetserleg TSF); RET (Steady Eddie)			WD (Shamwari IV)		RET (Steady Eddie)	
2019	(silver) (Tsetserleg TSF)						
2021	4th (On Cue); EL (Long Island T); EL (Tsetserleg TSF)	(gold) (On Cue)					
2022	4th (Tsetserleg TSF)						
2023	14th (Contessa)RT (Tsetserleg TSF)	EL (Contessa)		4th (Luke 140), 8th (Fedarman B), 25th (Tsetserleg TSF)	9th (Tsetserleg TSF), 10th (On Cue)	8th (Fedarman B)	
EL = Eliminated; RET = Retired; WD = Withdrew

== International championship results ==
Results
Year	Event	Horse	Placing	Notes
2010	World Equestrian Games	Neville Bardos	4th	Team
2010	World Equestrian Games	Neville Bardos	10th	Individual
2012	Olympic Games	Otis Barbotiere	7th	Team
2012	Olympic Games	Otis Barbotiere	RET	Individual
2014	World Equestrian Games	Shamwari IV	10th	Team
2014	World Equestrian Games	Shamwari IV	7th	Individual
2015	Pan American Games	Pancho Villa	1st place, gold medalist(s)	Team
2015	Pan American Games	Pancho Villa	4th	Individual
2016	Olympic Games	Blackfoot Mystery	6th	Team
2016	Olympic Games	Blackfoot Mystery	16th	Individual
2018	World Equestrian Games	Tsetserleg TSF	8th	Team
2018	World Equestrian Games	Tsetserleg TSF	56th	Individual
2019	Pan American Games	Tsetserleg TSF	1st place, gold medalist(s)	Team
2019	Pan American Games	Tsetserleg TSF	1st place, gold medalist(s)	Individual
2021	Olympic Games	Tsetserleg TSF	6th	Team
2021	Olympic Games	Tsetserleg TSF	20th	Individual
2022	World Championships	Tsetserleg TSF	2nd place, silver medalist(s)	Team
2022	World Championships	Tsetserleg TSF	20th	Individual
	EL = Eliminated; RET = Retired; WD = Withdrew			
