= Lauren Nicholson (equestrian) =

American equestrian

Personal information
- Born: June 6, 1987 (age 39) Mount Carmel, Illinois

Sport
- Sport: Equestrian
- Event: Eventing
Medal record
Equestrian
Representing the United States
World Championships
Silver medal – second place	2022 Pratoni	Team eventing
Pan American Games
Gold medal – first place	2015 Toronto	Team eventing

Lauren Nicholson (née Kieffer; born June 6, 1987) is an American equestrian who competes in eventing. As the leading USA rider in the Rolex Kentucky Three Day Event CCI, she won the Pinnacle Cup Trophy in 2014 and again in 2016, both times riding the Dutch Warmblood mare Veronica with whom she has been paired since 2013. Nicholson was a member of the gold medal-winning US eventing team at the 2015 Pan American Games, riding Meadowbrook's Scarlett.

Nicholson comes from a "non-horsey" family, the only daughter of a diesel mechanic and an accountant. She began riding lessons at age six, and began competing in eventing at age 12. She is closely associated with champion equestrians and trainers David and Karen O'Connor, with whom she has served a working apprenticeship since her late teens.

As of April 2016, Nicholson was the world's ninth-ranked eventing equestrian according to the Fédération Equestre Internationale (FEI), and at the time of the 2016 Summer Olympics in which Nicholson competed, was considered the top-ranked female eventing athlete in the United States.

In 2019, Nicholson was placed in the top 10 in the Burghley Horse Trials 5* aboard the American-bred Anglo-Arabian Vermiculus, the top placing among the contingent of riders from the United States. Vermiculus is a full brother to her 2010 Kentucky Three-Day Event horse Snooze Alarm. In discussing the training of Vermiculus, Nicholson has said, "You have to be very conscientious producing them[Anglo-Arabs], because they’re very, very smart."

== CCI***** results ==
Results
Event	Kentucky	Badminton	Luhmühlen	Burghley	Pau	Adelaide
2010	29th (Snooze Alarm)					
2011-2013	Did not participate					
2014	(silver) (Veronica)				9th (Veronica)	
2015	RET (Veronica)					
2016	(silver) (Veronica); 18th (Landmark's Monte Carlo)					
2017	WD (Vermiculus)	17th (Veronica); RET (Landmark's Monte Carlo)		12th (Veronica)		
2018	5th (Vermiculus); 18th (Landmark's Monte Carlo)	9th (Veronica)				
2019	8th (Paramount Importance); 9th (Vermiculus)			9th (Vermiculus)		
2021	16th (Vermiculus); 31st (Paramount Importance)					
EL = Eliminated; RET = Retired; WD = Withdrew

== International Championship Results ==
Results
Year	Event	Horse	Placing	Notes
2005	North American Junior Championships	Snooze Alarm	3rd place, bronze medalist(s)	Team
2005	North American Junior Championships	Snooze Alarm	22nd	Individual
2006	North American Young Rider Championships	Snooze Alarm	5th	Team
2006	North American Young Rider Championships	Snooze Alarm	18th	Individual
2007	North American Young Rider Championships	Snooze Alarm	2nd place, silver medalist(s)	Team
2007	North American Young Rider Championships	Snooze Alarm	13th	Individual
2015	Pan American Games	Meadowbrook's Scarlett	1st place, gold medalist(s)	Team
2015	Pan American Games	Meadowbrook's Scarlett	7th	Individual
2016	Olympic Games	Veronica	12th	Team
2016	Olympic Games	Veronica	EL	Individual
2018	World Equestrian Games	Vermiculus	EL	Individual
EL = Eliminated; RET = Retired; WD = Withdrew
