= Ruy Fonseca =

Brazilian equestrian

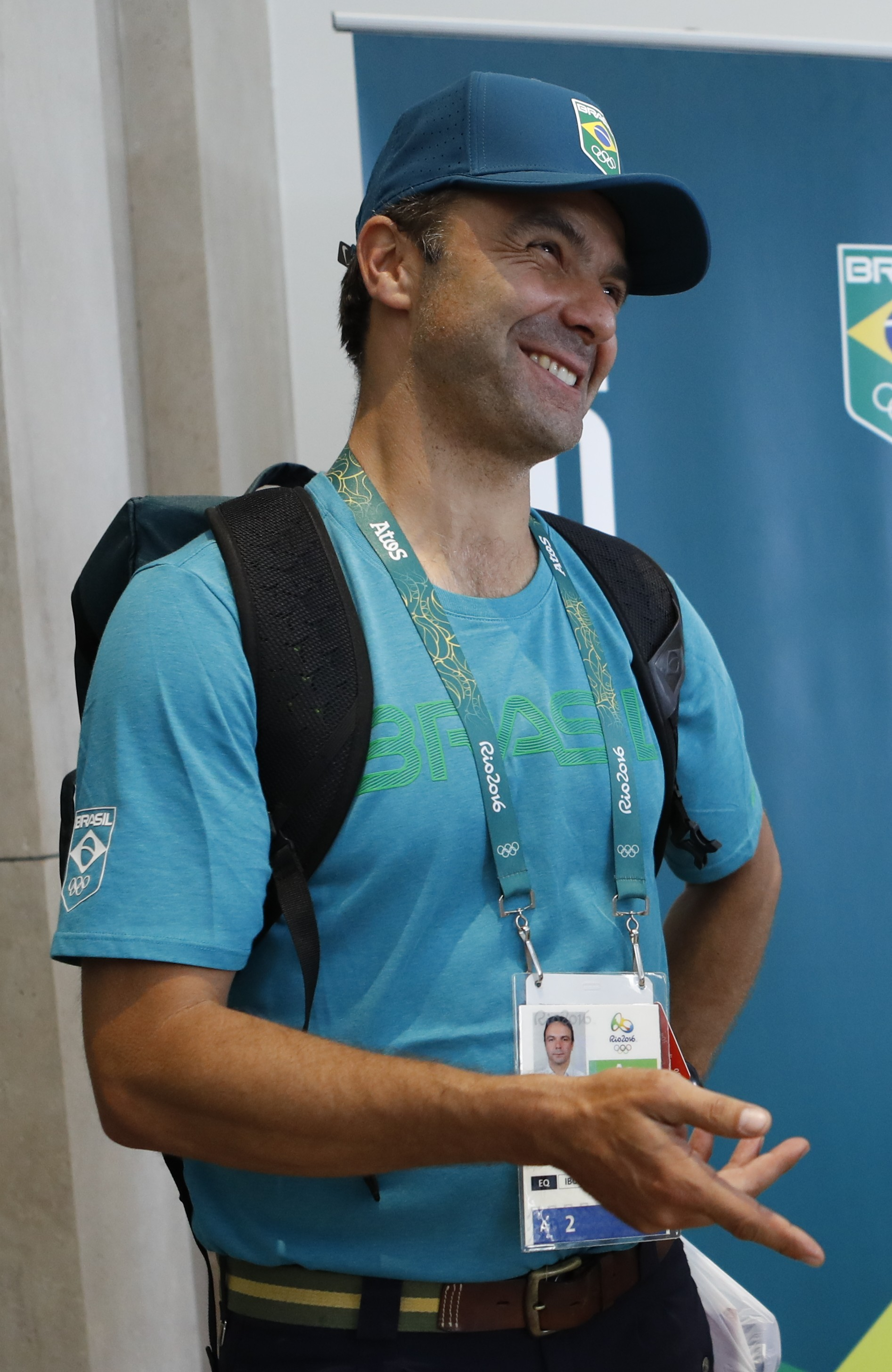
- Fonseca in 2016

Personal information
- Full name: Ruy Leme da Fonseca Filho
- Born: 9 June 1973 (age 53) São Paulo, Brazil
- Height: 181 cm (5 ft 11 in)
- Weight: 75 kg (165 lb)

Sport
- Sport: Equestrian
- Event: Eventing
- Club: Centro Hípico Junia Rabello
- Coached by: Mark Todd
Medal record
Equestrian
Representing Brazil
Pan American Games
Gold medal – first place	1995 Mar del Plata	Team eventing
Silver medal – second place	2015 Toronto	Team eventing
Silver medal – second place	2019 Lima	Team eventing
Bronze medal – third place	2011 Guadalajara	Team eventing
Bronze medal – third place	2015 Toronto	Individual eventing
Bronze medal – third place	2023 Santiago	Team eventing

Ruy Leme da Fonseca Filho (born 9 June 1973) is a Brazilian horse rider that competes in eventing. He won four Pan American Games medals from 1995 to 2015. Fonseca competed in two Summer Olympics, London 2012 - finishing 42nd in individual and 9th in team eventing - and Rio 2016, where Fonseca was eliminated in the jumping qualifiers after his horse refused to jump and threw him off.

Fonseca was the travelling reserve for Brazilian eventing team at the 2024 Summer Olympics. When Carlos Para withdrew Safira prior to the horse inspection, Fonseca rode Ballypatrick SRS in the show jumping phase of the team competition.

== CCI 5* Results ==
Results
Season	Kentucky	Badminton	Luhmühlen	Burghley	Pau	Adelaide
2007					EL (Idaho D'Argonne)	
2009		56th (Idaho D'Argonne)				
2010			32nd (Idaho D'Argonne)			
2014	EL (Tom Bombadill Too)					
EL = Eliminated; RET = Retired; WD = Withdrew

== International Championship Results ==
Results
Year	Event	Horse	Placing	Notes
2004	World Young Horse Championships	Quizy	45th	CCI**
2010	World Equestrian Games	Tom Bombadill Too	12th	Team
2010	World Equestrian Games	Tom Bombadill Too	36th	Individual
2011	Pan American Games	Tom Bombadill Too	3rd place, bronze medalist(s)	Team
2011	Pan American Games	Tom Bombadill Too	EL	Individual
2012	Olympic Games	Tom Bombadill Too	9th	Team
2012	Olympic Games	Tom Bombadill Too	42nd	Individual
2014	World Equestrian Games	Tom Bombadill Too	7th	Team
2014	World Equestrian Games	Tom Bombadill Too	38th	Individual
2015	Pan American Games	Tom Bombadill Too	2nd place, silver medalist(s)	Team
2015	Pan American Games	Tom Bombadill Too	3rd place, bronze medalist(s)	Individual
2016	Olympic Games	Tom Bombadill Too	7th	Team
2016	Olympic Games	Tom Bombadill Too	EL	Individual
2017	World Young Horse Championships	Ballypatrick SRS	22nd	CCI*
2019	Pan American Games	Ballypatrick SRS	2nd place, silver medalist(s)	Team
2019	Pan American Games	Ballypatrick SRS	EL	Individual
EL = Eliminated; RET = Retired; WD = Withdrew
