= Phillip Dutton =

Australian equestrian (born 1963)

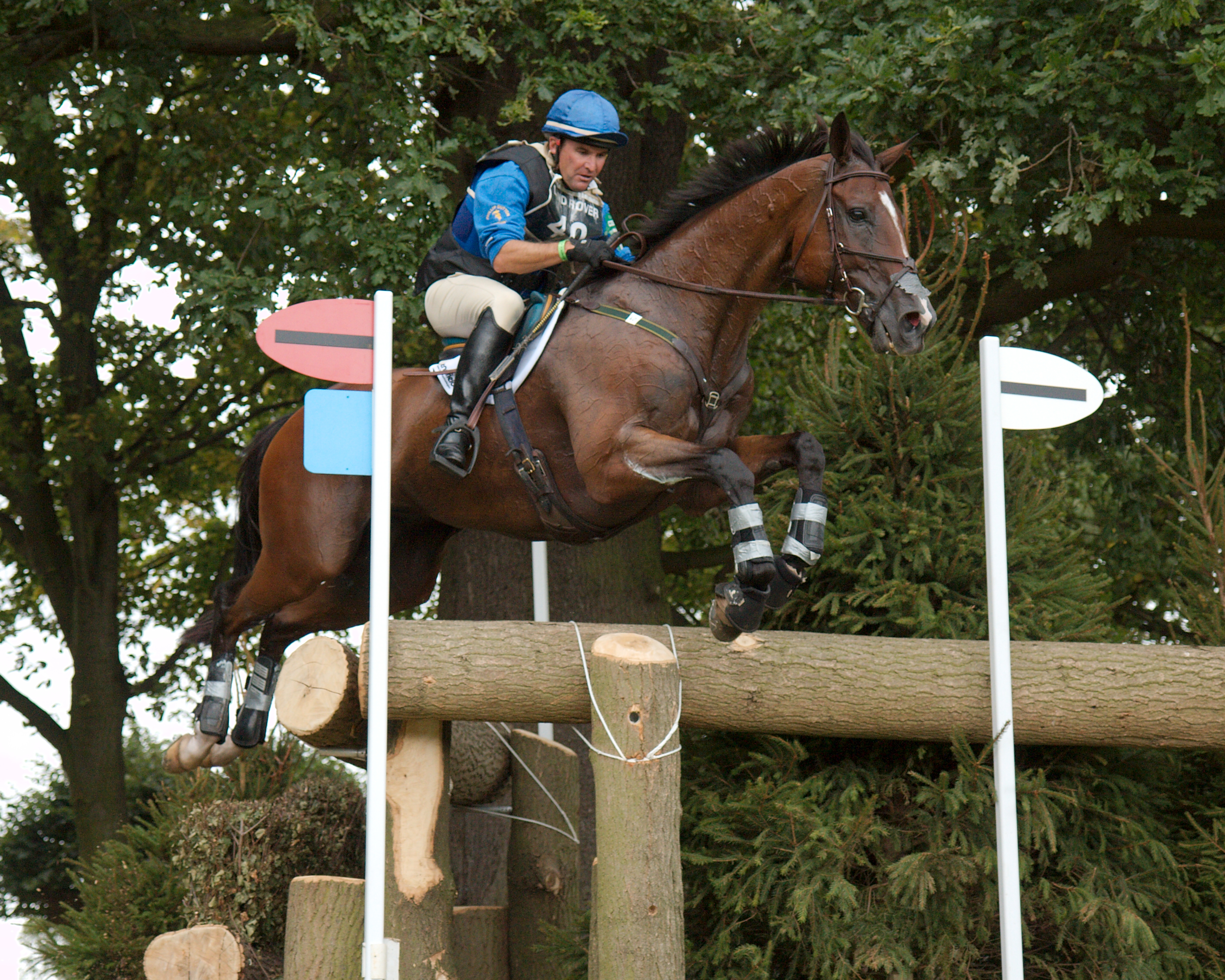
- Dutton and Truluck at Capability's Classic during the cross country phase of Burghley Horse Trials 2009

Personal information
- Full name: Phillip Peter Dutton
- Nationality: United States (naturalized 2006)
- Discipline: Equestrian
- Born: 13 September 1963 (age 63); Nyngan, New South Wales, Australia
Medal record
Equestrian
Representing Australia
Olympic Games
Gold medal – first place	1996 Atlanta	Team eventing
Gold medal – first place	2000 Sydney	Team eventing
Representing the United States
Olympic Games
Bronze medal – third place	2016 Rio de Janeiro	Individual eventing
World Championships
Bronze medal – third place	2026 Aachen	Team eventing
Pan American Games
Gold medal – first place	2007 Rio de Janeiro	Team eventing
Gold medal – first place	2015 Toronto	Team eventing

Phillip Peter Dutton, OAM (born 13 September 1963), is an Australian-born Olympic-level equestrian rider competing in eventing for the United States of America. He is a dual Olympic gold medalist who formerly competed for his country of birth but now competes for the USA.

== Biography ==
Dutton was born in Nyngan and was educated at Newington College (1976–1979). He pursued his passion for riding in Australia until 1991 when he moved to the United States to train in a more internationally competitive environment. In the 1996 Atlanta and 2000 Sydney Olympic Games he was a member of Australia's Gold Medal Three-day Eventing Team and he has now represented Australia in three Olympics and four World Equestrian Games. He is very active on the U.S. eventing circuit, winning the USEA Leading Rider of the Year title in 1998, and 2000, 2001, 2002, 2003, 2004, 2005, and 2006. In 2005 he was also the number one FEI World Event Rider. Phillip and his wife, Evie, live in Avondale, Pennsylvania with Evie's daughter and their twin girls. Dutton's farm, True Prospect Farm, is located in West Grove, Pennsylvania.

In 2006, Dutton announced that he would be changing his citizenship, allowing him to ride for the United States. In his letter to the EFA, informing them of the change, he wrote: "I would like to thank the EFA for everything they have done for me and my career as a Three-Day Event rider... It has been an honour to be a member of the EFA and to represent Australia internationally for the past 12 years."

In April 2007, Dutton took second at the Rolex Kentucky Three Day, as his first time riding for the U.S. Later that year, he won the team gold and individual silver medal at the 2007 Pan American Games on Truluck.

In April 2008, Dutton won his first Rolex Kentucky Three-Day Event. Dutton competed at the 2008 Summer Olympics, but was disqualified from the individual event for riding with illegal equipment.

On 24 May 2016 it was announced that Dutton would be working with Kentucky Derby runner-up Commanding Curve in his second career as an eventing horse. While eventing with Dutton, Commanding Curve was injured and later passed on to a novice rider.

In 2016, Dutton and Mighty Nice won an individual bronze medal in the 2016 Summer Olympics in Rio de Janeiro.

== Recognition ==
In 1997, Dutton was awarded the Medal of the Order of Australia. He was inducted into the Sport Australia Hall of Fame in 2001.

== CCI 5* results ==
Results
Event	Kentucky	Badminton	Luhmühlen	Burghley	Pau	Adelaide
1997		35th (True Blue Girdwood)				
1998		9th (Fairdinkum)				
1999–2002	Did not participate					
2003	9th (I'm So Brite)	8th (Hannigan); 14th (Cayman Went)				
2004	(silver) (Nova Top)					
2005	(silver) (The Foreman); 4th (Hannigan); 5th (Nova Top)			(silver) (The Foreman); 10th (Amazing Odyssey)		
2006	4th (Connaught); 22nd (Amazing Odyssey)					
2007	(silver) (Connaught); 10th (Trulock)					
2008	(gold) (Connaught); 10th (Woodburn)			WD (Woodburn)		
2009	7th (Connaught); 12th (Woodburn)			4th (Trulock)		
2010	(silver) (Trulock); 6th (The Foreman); WD (Kheops Du Quesnay); RET (Waterfront)					
2011	18th (Fernhill Eagle)					
2012	10th (Mighty Nice); 12th (Fernhill Eagle)					
2013	11th (Fernhill Eagle); RET (Mighty Nice)				4th (Mr Medicott)	
2014	8th (Trading Aces); WD (Mighty Nice); WD (Mr Medicott)		7th (Mighty Nice)			
2015	5th (Fernhill Cubalawn); 9th (Fernhill Fugitive); WD (Mighty Nice)					
2016	4th (Mighty Nice); 5th (Fernhill Cubalawn); 13th (Fernhill Fugitive)			18th (Fernhill Fugitive)		
2017	4th (Mr Medicott); 8th (Fernhill Fugitive); 10th (I'm Sew Ready)					
2018	4th (Z); 13th (I'm Sew Ready)				EL (I'm Sew Ready)	
2019	7th (Z)					
EL = Eliminated; RET = Retired; WD = Withdrew

== International championship results ==
Results
Year	Event	Horse	Placing	Notes
1994	World Equestrian Games	True Blue Girdwood	4th	Team
1994	World Equestrian Games	True Blue Girdwood	18th	Individual
1996	Olympic Games	True Blue Girdwood	1st place, gold medalist(s)	Team
1998	World Equestrian Games	True Blue Girdwood	17th	Individual
2000	Olympic Games	House Doctor	1st place, gold medalist(s)	Team
2002	World Equestrian Games	House Doctor	5th	Individual
2003	Asian Pacific Games	Nova Top	1st place, gold medalist(s)	Team
2003	Asian Pacific Games	Nova Top	1st place, gold medalist(s)	Individual
2004	Olympic Games	Nova Top	6th	Team
2004	Olympic Games	Nova Top	13th	Individual
2005	World Cup Final	Nova Top	9th	
2006	World Equestrian Games	Connaught	30th	Individual
2007	Pan American Games	Truluck	1st place, gold medalist(s)	Team
2007	Pan American Games	Truluck	2nd place, silver medalist(s)	Individual
2008	Olympic Games	Connaught	7th	Team
2008	Olympic Games	Connaught	EL	Individual
2010	World Equestrian Games	Woodburn	4th	Team
2010	World Equestrian Games	Woodburn	18th	Individual
2012	Olympic Games	Mystery Whisper	7th	Team
2012	Olympic Games	Mystery Whisper	23rd	Individual
2014	World Equestrian Games	Trading Aces	10th	Team
2014	World Equestrian Games	Trading Aces	RET	Individual
2015	Pan American Games	Fernhill Fugitive	1st place, gold medalist(s)	Team
2015	Pan American Games	Fernhill Fugitive	10th	Individual
2016	Olympic Games	Mighty Nice	12th	Team
2016	Olympic Games	Mighty Nice	3rd place, bronze medalist(s)	Individual
2018	World Equestrian Games	Z	8th	Team
2018	World Equestrian Games	Z	13th	Individual
EL = Eliminated; RET = Retired; WD = Withdrew
