= Caledon Equestrian Park =

Canadian equestrian facility in Ontario

Coordinates: 43.9572°N 79.8346°W

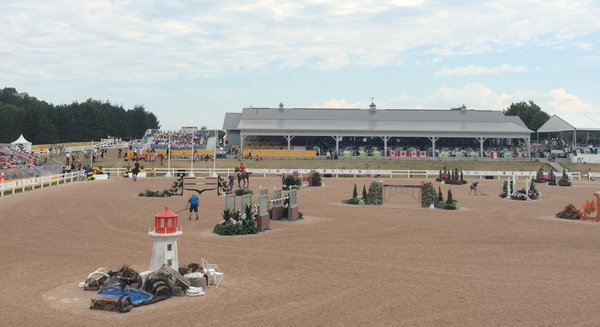
- Interactive map of Caledon Equestrian Park
- Location: 200 Pine Avenue; Caledon, Ontario, Canada
- Owner: Angelstone Events
- Capacity: 4,000

Construction
- Renovated: 2012-2014

Tenant
- 2015 Pan American Games

The Caledon Equestrian Park is a current equestrian facility in Caledon, Ontario, Canada and was used for the 2015 Pan American Games. The facility's renovations were completed in 2014, one year before the games start. The stadium is planned to have 4,000 seats.

The venue was officially named the equestrian venue for the 2015 Pan American Games on May 19, 2012.

The renovations brings many changes to the facility including a new stadium, permanent and temporary seating for the games, a new grand prix arena, training facilities, an indoor training facility among others. During the games every portion of the equestrian event besides the cross-country portion of the eventing competition will be held at the venue.

Since 1986, Equestrian Management Group, Inc. has operated the Caledon Equestrian Park in partnership with the Town of Caledon and Toronto and Region Conservation Authority. Set against the picturesque backdrop of the Niagara Escarpment, the park has hosted four Pan American Games and two Olympic Games team selection competitions, fifteen World Cup qualifying events, and has hosted more than 150 Grand Prix equestrian events.

The Federal Government provided $6.8 million to upgrade the venue for the 2015 Pan American Games.

== See also ==
- Venues of the 2015 Pan American and Parapan American Games
