= Carlos Paro =

Brazilian equestrian

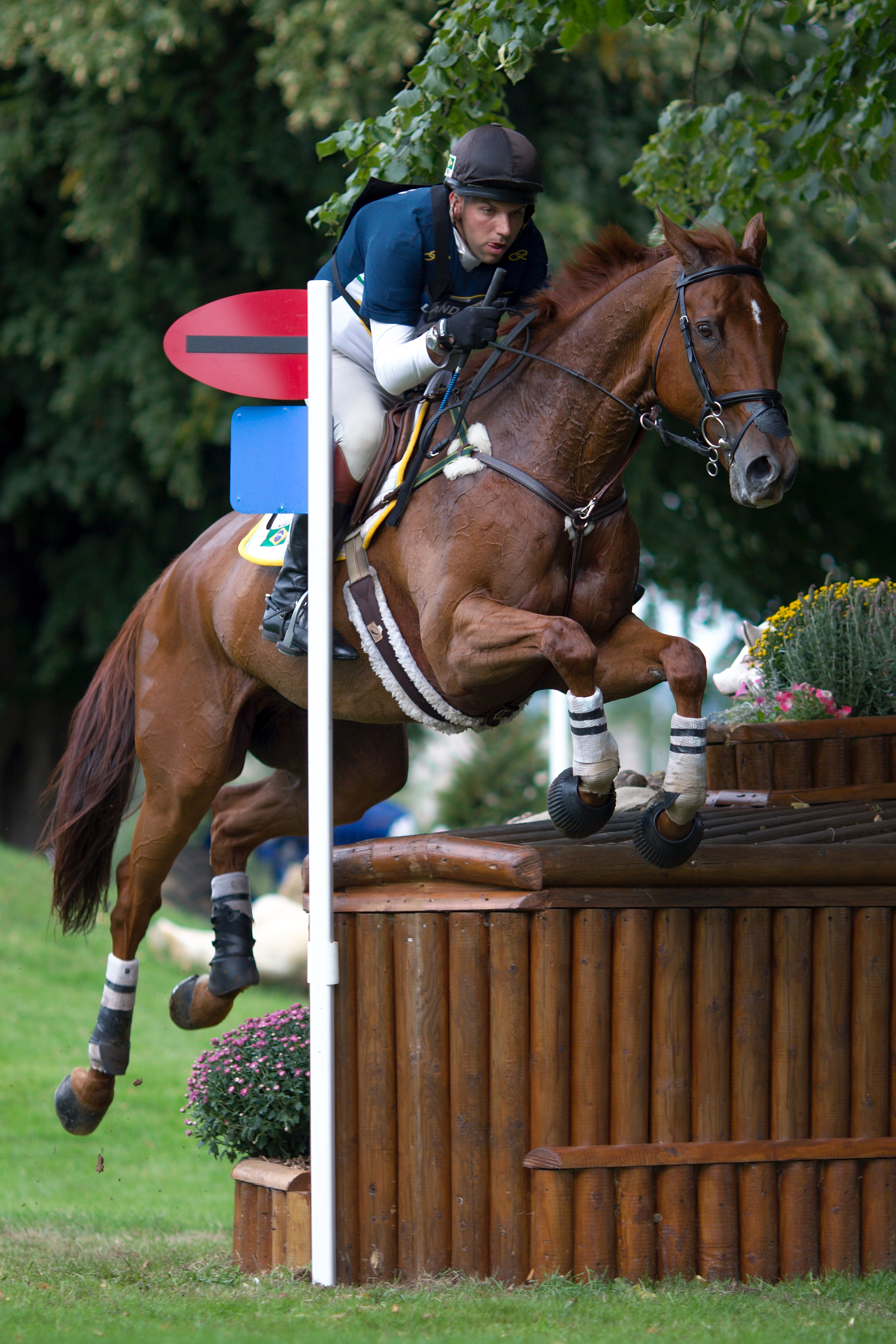
- Parro and Political Mandate at the Dairy Farm during the cross-country phase of Burghley Horse Trials 2010

Personal information
- Native name: Carlos Parro
- Nickname: Caca
- National team: Brazil
- Born: 5 June 1979 (age 47) Colina, São Paulo, Brazil
- Occupation: Professional equestrian

Sport
- Country: Brazil
- Club: Hartill Stud, Great Britain
- Coached by: Mark Todd, Charlotte Dujardin, Robert Smith
Medal record
Equestrian
Representing Brazil
Pan American Games
Silver medal – second place	2015 Toronto	Team eventing
Silver medal – second place	2019 Lima	Team eventing
Bronze medal – third place	2007 Rio de Janeiro	Team eventing
Bronze medal – third place	2019 Lima	Individual eventing
Bronze medal – third place	2023 Santiago	Team eventing
South American Championships
Gold medal – first place	2001 Belo Horizonte	Team eventing
Gold medal – first place	2022 Buenos Aires	Individual eventing
Gold medal – first place	2022 Buenos Aires	Team eventing

Carlos Paro (alternatively spelled Parro, born 5 June 1979, in Colina, Brazil) is an event rider who won a team bronze medal in the 2007 Pan American Games in Rio de Janeiro, Brazil in 2007, a team silver medal in the 2015 Pan American Games in Toronto, Canada and an Individual Bronze and team Silver in the 2019 Pan American Games in Lima, Peru in eventing for Brazil. He has competed in four Olympic games: the 2000 Summer Olympics in Sydney, Australia, the 2016 Summer Olympics in Rio de Janeiro, Brazil, the 2020 Summer Olympics in Tokyo, Japan and the 2024 Summer Olympics in Paris.

== Equestrian career ==
Paro began riding at age seven and started eventing at age 8, in Colina, Brazil. In 1997, he travelled to the United Kingdom to train with Christopher Bartle.

Paro's first major event was the World Equestrian Games in Rome in 1998 at the age of 19, where he finished the team competition in 9th place. He also won the team gold medal in the South American Games in Belo Horizonte in 2001.

In 2002, he relocated permanently to the U.K. He was named as a reserve for the 2012 Summer Olympics in London, and a few days before the Games started, he was called into the team as one of the horses was injured, but due to a misunderstanding in the Brazilian Equestrian Federation (CBH – Confederacao Brasileira de Hipismo) his forms were never sent to the IOC (International Olympic Committee) which meant he wasn't allowed to compete.

In July 2015, Carlos Parro rode as one of the team members for the 2015 Pan American Games in Toronto, riding Calcourt Landline. The team won the silver medal just a few marks behind the USA.

Parro competed at his second Summer Olympics in 2016. At the Games held in front of his home crowd in Rio de Janeiro, Brazil, he finished 7th in the team competition and 18th individually with the horse Summon Up The Blood.

In 2019 with a new horse, Quaikin Qurious, Carlos Parro won the individual bronze medal at the 2019 Pan American Games in Lima, Peru and the team silver medal, which qualified the Brazilian Eventing Team for the 2020 Olympics in Tokyo, Japan.

In October 2022, Carlos won an individual and team gold medal at the South American Championship in Buenos Aires, Argentina riding Tullabeg Chinzano.

=== 2024 Paris Olympic Games ===
In 2024, Paro was selected to ride for Brazil in the Summer Olympic Games in Paris. After scoring a 37.70 in their dressage test, Paro was issued a Yellow card by the International Federation for Equestrian Sports (FEI) when pictures emerged showing him hyper-flexing Safira's neck, using a Rollkur position. In their decision, the FEI suggested the athlete's conduct could cause unnecessary discomfort to the horse, and compromise its breathing. He was not disqualified from the competition. When asked about the incident, Parro attributed the actions to his horse Safira, recounting, "she did it by herself".

After the cross-country phase of the event, Paro did not present Safira for the vet inspection prior to show jumping. They subsequently withdrew from the competition.

== Notable International Results ==
Results
Year	Event	Horse	Placing	Notes
2022	South American Championship, Buenos Aires ARG	Tullabeg Chinzano	1st place, gold medalist(s)	Team
2022	South American Championship, Buenos Aires ARG	Tullabeg Chinzano	1st place, gold medalist(s)	Individual
2021	Olympic Games, Tokyo JAP	Goliath	32nd	
2019	Event Riders Master, Millstreet IRE	Calcourt Landline	7th	
2019	Pan American Games, Lima PER	Quaikin Qurious	2nd place, silver medalist(s)	Team
2019	Pan American Games, Lima PER	Quaikin Qurious	3rd place, bronze medalist(s)	Individual
2019	Haras De Jardy, FRA	Tullabeg Chinzano	1st	
2016	Olympic Games, Rio de Janeiro BRA	Summon Up The Blood	7th	Team
2016	Olympic Games, Rio de Janeiro BRA	Summon Up The Blood	18th	Individual
2015	Pan American Games, Toronto CAN	Calcourt Landline	2nd place, silver medalist(s)	Team
2015	Pan American Games, Toronto CAN	Calcourt Landline	6th	Individual
2007	Pan American Games, Rio de Janeiro BRA	Political Mandate	3rd place, bronze medalist(s)	Team
2007	Pan American Games, Rio de Janeiro BRA	Political Mandate	14th	Individual

== Related links ==
- Andre Parro, Carlos Parro's brother who represented Brazil in Eventing at the Olympics in 2004 and 2008
