= Will O' Wind Farm =

Coordinates: 44°2′2.6″N 80°1′28.2″W

- Interactive map of Will O' Wind Farm
- Location: Mono, Ontario
- Owner: Ann & Geoff Morgan
- Capacity: 13,000

Construction
- Opened: 1979

Tenant
- 2015 Pan American Games

Will O' Wind Farm is an equestrian facility in Mono and was official host venue for the cross-country phase of eventing at the 2015 Pan American Games held in Toronto.

The facility was opened in 1979 by Ann and Geoff Morgan. The venue has hosted national and international events to FEI Three Star level and has hosted the Ontario Provincial Eventing Championships in on three occasions. Will O' Wind also hosts schooling shows and clinics throughout the summer.

For the 2015 Games the venue was bought up to FEI Three-Star standards and seating was located in clusters all over the course.

== See also ==
- Venues of the 2015 Pan American and Parapan American Games
