= Colleen Loach =

Canadian equestrian

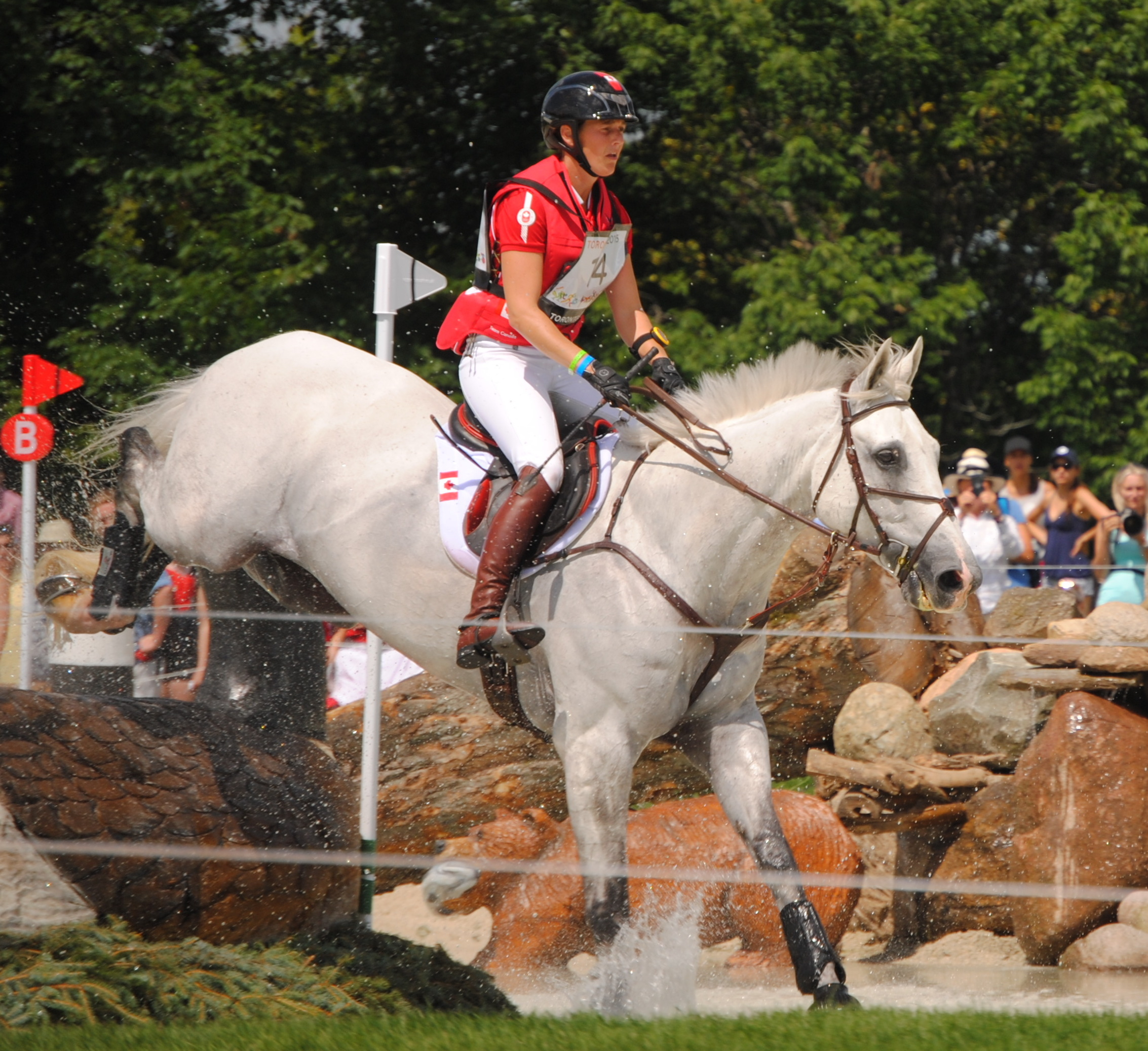
- Colleen Loach at the 2015 Pan Am Games

Personal information
- Full name: Colleen Loach
- Nationality: Canadian
- Discipline: Eventing
- Born: April 10, 1983 (age 43); Sherbrooke, Quebec
Medal record
Equestrian
Representing Canada
Pan American Games
Gold medal – first place	2023 Santiago	Team eventing
Bronze medal – third place	2019 Lima	Team eventing
Bronze medal – third place	2015 Toronto	Team eventing

Colleen Loach (born April 10, 1983) is a Canadian equestrian who competes in the sport of eventing. Loach won a bronze medal as part of the Canadian eventing team at the 2015 Pan American Games in Toronto.

In July 2016, she was named to Canada's Olympic team. At the Games held in Rio de Janeiro, Brazil, Loach placed 10th in the team competition and finished 42nd individually, collecting 145.70 penalties across the three phases aboard the Selle Français gelding Qorry Blue d'Argouges.

Loach and Qorry Blue d'Argouges returned to the Olympics in 2021, when they placed 28th individually.

== CCI 5* Results ==
Results
Event	Kentucky	Badminton	Luhmühlen	Burghley	Pau	Adelaide
2018	17th (Qorry Blue D'Argouges)					
2019	EL (Qorry Blue D'Argouges)					
2021	EL (Qorry Blue D'Argouges)					
EL = Eliminated; RET = Retired; WD = Withdrew

== International Championship Results ==
Results
Year	Event	Horse	Placing	Notes
2003	North American Young Rider Championships	Dare To Compare	3rd place, bronze medalist(s)	Team
2003	North American Young Rider Championships	Dare To Compare	8th	Individual
2015	Pan American Games	Qorry Blue D'Argouges	3rd place, bronze medalist(s)	Team
2015	Pan American Games	Qorry Blue D'Argouges	8th	Individual
2016	Olympic Games	Qorry Blue D'Argouges	10th	Team
2016	Olympic Games	Qorry Blue D'Argouges	42nd	Individual
2018	World Equestrian Games	Qorry Blue D'Argouges	11th	Team
2018	World Equestrian Games	Qorry Blue D'Argouges	47th	Individual
2019	Pan American Games	FE Golden Eye	3rd place, bronze medalist(s)	Team
2019	Pan American Games	FE Golden Eye	20th	Individual
EL = Eliminated; RET = Retired; WD = Withdrew
