= Equestrian at the 2024 Summer Olympics – Individual eventing =

Individual eventing at the Games of the XXXIII Olympiad
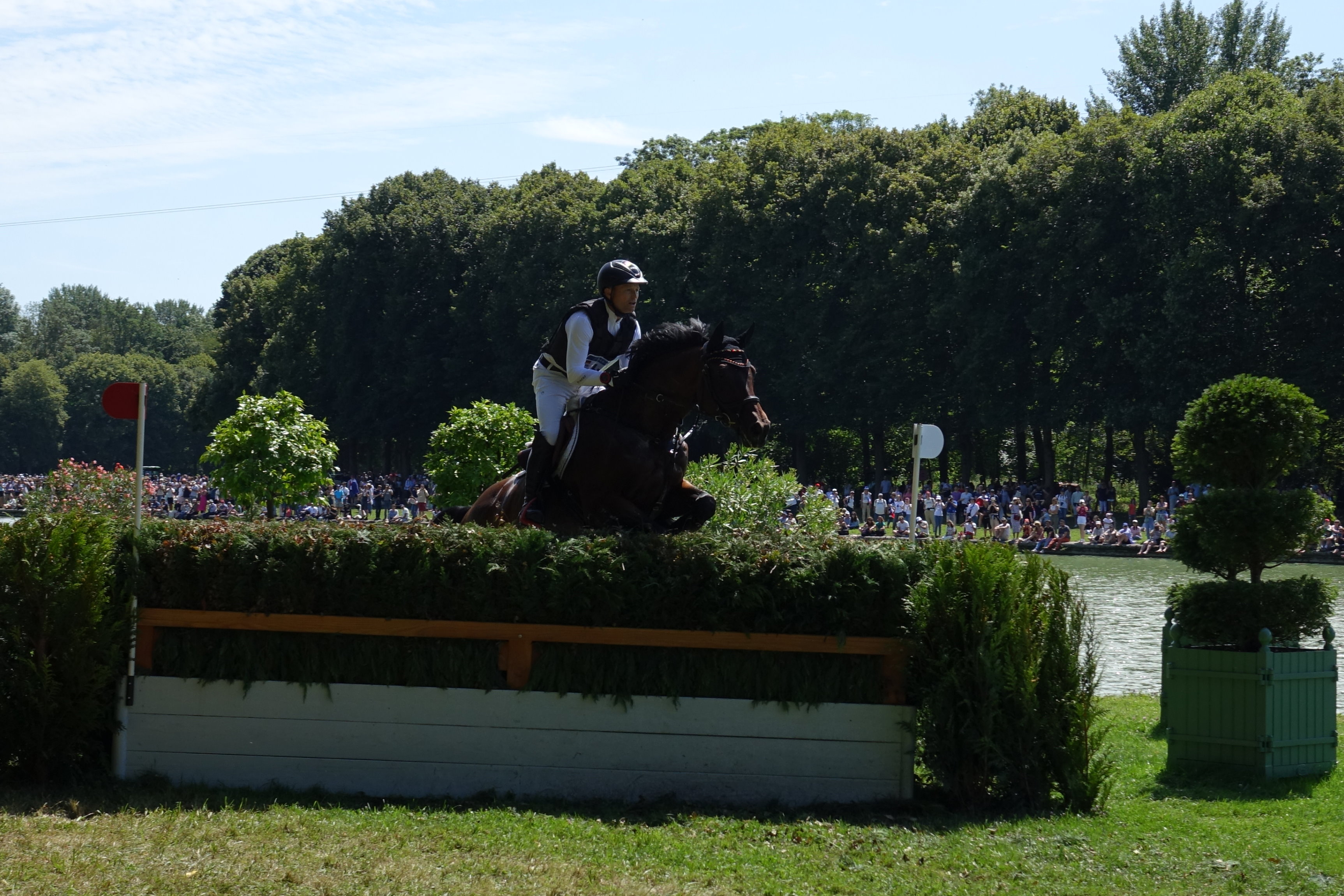
- Jung and Chipmunk Frh vault over the Le Jardin à la Française obstacle during the cross country run
- Venue: Château de Versailles
- Date: 27 July – 29 July 2024

Medalists
1st place, gold medalist(s)		Michael Jung on Chipmunk Frh	Germany
2nd place, silver medalist(s)		Chris Burton on Shadow Man	Australia
3rd place, bronze medalist(s)		Laura Collett on London 52	Great Britain

The individual eventing event at the 2024 Summer Olympics is scheduled to take place from 27 July to 29 July 2024 at the Château de Versailles.

Like all other equestrian events, the eventing competition is open-gender, with both male and female athletes competing in the same division.

== Background ==
This will be the 26th appearance of the event, which has been held at every Summer Olympics since it was introduced in 1912.

== Competition format ==
The eventing competition features all riders competing in three rounds (dressage, cross-country, and jumping) with the top 25 advancing to a second jumping round. Scores from the first three rounds are summed to determine finalists; scores from all four rounds are summed to give a final score for the finalists.

- Dressage test: A shortened dressage competition, with penalties based on the dressage score
- Cross-country test: A race over a 4.5 kilometres cross-country course. The time allotted is 8 minutes (570 metres per minute), with penalties assessed for exceeding that time. There are a maximum of 38 obstacles, with penalties assessed for faults. Staggered starts.
- Jumping test: A 600-metre show jumping course, with 11 or 12 obstacles (including double and triple jumps, with a maximum of 16 jumps total). Maximum height of obstacles is 1.25 metres. The required speed is 375 metres/minute (time limit of 1:36). Penalties are assessed for exceeding the time limit and for faults at the obstacles.
- Final jumping test: A shorter (360–500 metres) show jumping course. Maximum obstacles is 9, with maximum 12 jumps. The speed required is still 375 metres per minute. Obstacles may be slightly higher (1.30 metres).

== Schedule ==
The event takes place over three days, beginning with the dressage followed by cross-country and jumping on the next two days.

== Results ==
=== Standings after dressage ===
These were the standings after the dressage round on day 1:

Rank	Rider No.	Rider	Nationality	Horse	Dressage
1	33	Laura Collett	Great Britain	London 52	17.5
2	49	Michael Jung	Germany	Chipmunk Frh	17.8
3	43	Alex Hua Tian	China	Jilsonne Van Bareelhof	22
3	50	Christopher Burton	Australia	Shadow Man	22
5	53	Felix Vogg	Switzerland	Dao De L'Ocean	22.1
6	57	Rosalind Canter	Great Britain	Lordships Graffalo	23.4
7	39	Stéphane Landois	France	Chaman Dumontceau	24.4
8	36	Yoshiaki Oiwa	Japan	Mgh Grafton Street	25.5
9	35	Clarke Johnstone	New Zealand	Menlo Park	25.7
9	61	Giovanni Ugolotti	Italy	Swirly Temptress	25.7
11	9	Tom McEwen	Great Britain	Jl Dublin	25.8
12	59	Tim Price	New Zealand	Falco	26.5
13	16	Karin Donckers	Belgium	Leipheimer Van 'T Verahof	26.6
13	37	Evelina Bertoli	Italy	Fidjy Des Melezes	26.6
15	1	Julia Krajewski	Germany	Nickel 21	26.9
16	62	Raf Kooremans	Netherlands	Radar Love	27
17	63	Nicolas Touzaint	France	Diabolo Menthe	27.2
18	60	Kazuma Tomoto	Japan	Vinci De La Vigne	27.4
19	30	Elisabeth Halliday	United States	Nutcracker	28
20	29	Robin Godel	Switzerland	Grandeur De Lully Ch	29.1
21	25	Christoph Wahler	Germany	Carjatan S	29.4
22	15	Florent Laghouag Karim	France	Triton Fontaine	29.6
23	64	Lara de Liedekerke-Meier	Belgium	Origi	30
24	17	Carlos Diaz Fernandez	Spain	Taraje Cp 21.10	30.2
25	6	Caroline Pamukcu	United States	Hsh Blake	30.4
26	54	Boyd Martin	United States	Fedarman B	30.5
27	11	Jonelle Price	New Zealand	Hiarado	30.8
28	52	Austin O'Connor	Ireland	Colorado Blue	31.7
29	14	Janneke Boonzaaijer	Netherlands	Champ De Tailleur	31.9
30	23	Peter Flarup	Denmark	Fascination	32.4
30	34	Rafael Losano	Brazil	Withington	32.4
32	28	Susannah Berry	Ireland	Wellfields Lincoln	33
33	8	Sofia Sjöborg	Sweden	Bryjamolga Vh Marienshof	33.3
33	32	Frida Andersen	Sweden	Box Leo	33.3
33	58	Márcio Jorge	Brazil	Castle Howard Casanova	33.3
36	20	Sun Huadong	China	Lady Chin V'T Moerven Z	33.6
37	12	Ryuzo Kitajima	Japan	Cekatinka	34.5
38	2	Shane Rose	Australia	Virgil	34.6
39	55	Robert Powała	Poland	Tosca Del Castegno	34.7
40	38	Sanne de Jong	Netherlands	Enjoy	34.8
41	26	Kevin McNab	Australia	Don Quidam	34.9
42	3	Michael Winter	Canada	El Mundo	35.2
43	41	Sanna Siltakorpi	Finland	Bofey Click	35.4
43	51	Jessica Phoenix	Canada	Freedom Gs	35.4
45	47	Miloslav Prihoda	Czech Republic	Ferreolus Lat	35.7
46	27	Karl Slezak	Canada	Hot Bobo	35.8
46	31	Jan Kaminski	Poland	Jard	35.8
48	45	Noor Slaoui	Morocco	Cash In Hand	36.4
49	46	Harald Ambros	Austria	Vitorio Du Montet	36.5
50	22	Veera Manninen	Finland	Sir Greg	36.8
51	10	Carlos Parro	Brazil	Safira	37.7
51	21	Ronald Zabala	Ecuador	Forever Young Wundermaske	37.7
51	56	Louise Romeike	Sweden	Caspian 15	37.7
54	4	Sarah Ennis	Ireland	Action Lady M	37.7
55	5	Mélody Johner	Switzerland	Toubleu de Rueire	38.4
56	42	Alexander Peternell	South Africa	Figaro des Premices	39.0
57	7	Małgorzata Korycka	Poland	Canvalencia	39.4
58	24	Esteban Benitez Valle	Spain	Utrera AA 35	39.9
59	44	Manuel Grave	Portugal	Carat de Bremoy	40.9
60	48	Nicolas Wettstein	Ecuador	Altier D'Aurois	42.3
61	40	Tine Magnus	Belgium	Did van het Lichterveld Z	44.0
62	18	Balázs Kaizinger	Hungary	Herr Cooles Classico	45.8
63	19	Miroslav Trunda	Czech Republic	Shutterflyke	53.0
EL	13	Emiliano Portale	Italy	Future	EL

=== Standings after cross country ===
These were the standings after day 2:

Rank	Rider	Horse	Nationality	Dressage	Cross Country	Total	Notes
1	Michael Jung	CHIPMUNK FRH	Germany	17.8	0.0	17.8	
2	Laura Collett	LONDON 52	Great Britain	17.5	0.8	18.3	
3	Christopher Burton	SHADOW MAN	Australia	22.0	0.0	22.0	
4	Felix Vogg	DAO DE L'OCEAN	Switzerland	22.1	0.0	22.1	
5	Yoshiaki Oiwa	MGH GRAFTON STREET	Japan	25.5	0.0	25.5	
6	Tom McEwen	JL DUBLIN	Great Britain	25.8	0.0	25.8	
7	Stephane Landois	CHAMAN DUMONTCEAU	France	24.4	2.8	27.2	
8	Kazuma Tomoto	VINCI DE LA VIGNE	Japan	27.4	0.0	27.4	
9	Tim Price	FALCO	New Zealand	26.5	2.0	28.5	
10	Karim Florent Laghouag	TRITON FONTAINE	France	29.6	0.0	29.6	
11	Nicolas Touzaint	DIABOLO MENTHE	France	27.2	3.2	30.4	
12	Clarke Johnstone	MENLO PARK	New Zealand	25.7	4.8	30.5	
13	Lara de Liedekerke - Meier	ORIGI	Belgium	30.0	1.2	31.2	
14	Julia Krajewski	NICKEL 21	Germany	26.9	4.8	31.7	
14	Austin O'Connor	COLORADO BLUE	Ireland	31.7	0.0	31.7	
16	Janneke Boonzaaijer	CHAMP DE TAILLEUR	Netherlands	31.9	0.0	31.9	
17	Boyd Martin	FEDARMAN B	United States	30.5	1.6	32.1	
18	Raf Kooremans	RADAR LOVE	Netherlands	27.0	5.6	32.6	
19	Evelina Bertoli	FIDJY DES MELEZES	Italy	26.6	6.4	33.0	
20	Frida Andersen	BOX LEO	Sweden	33.3	0.0	33.3	
21	Karin Donckers	LEIPHEIMER VAN 'T VERAHOF	Belgium	26.6	7.2	33.8	
22	Elisabeth Halliday	NUTCRACKER	United States	28.0	6.0	34.0	
23	Shane Rose	VIRGIL	Australia	34.6	2.8	37.4	
24	Rosalind Canter	LORDSHIPS GRAFFALO	Great Britain	23.4	15.0	38.4	
25	Louise Romeike	CASPIAN 15	Sweden	37.7	0.8	38.5	
26	Robin Godel	GRANDEUR DE LULLY CH	Switzerland	29.1	9.6	38.7	
27	Karl Slezak	HOT BOBO	Canada	35.8	4.8	40.6	
28	Ryuzo Kitajima	CEKATINKA	Japan	34.5	6.4	40.9	
29	Sarah Ennis	ACTION LADY M	Ireland	38.0	3.2	41.2	
30	Melody Johner	TOUBLEU DE RUEIRE	Switzerland	38.4	3.2	41.6	
30	Rafael Losano	WITHINGTON	Brazil	32.4	9.2	41.6	
32	Alex Hua Tian	JILSONNE VAN BAREELHOF	China	22.0	20.6	42.6	
33	Harald Ambros	VITORIO DU MONTET	Austria	36.5	6.8	43.3	
34	Tine Magnus	DIA VAN HET LICHTERVELD Z	Belgium	44.0	2.0	46.0	
35	Carlos Diaz Fernandez	TARAJE CP 21.10	Spain	30.2	17.6	47.8	
36	Susannah Berry	WELLFIELDS LINCOLN	Ireland	33.0	15.2	48.2	
37	Sofia Sjöborg	BRYJAMOLGA VH MARIENSHOF	Sweden	33.3	15.0	48.3	
38	Michael Winter	EL MUNDO	Canada	35.2	14.4	49.6	
39	Veera Manninen	SIR GREG	Finland	36.8	18.4	55.2	
40	Sanna Siltakorpi	BOFEY CLICK	Finland	35.4	20.8	57.2	
41	Jonelle Price	HIARADO	New Zealand	30.8	28.4	59.2	
42	Carlos Parro	SAFIRA	Brazil	37.7	22.4	60.1	
43	Noor Slaoui	CASH IN HAND	Morocco	36.4	24.0	60.4	
44	Małgorzata Korycka	CANVALENCIA	Poland	39.4	21.2	60.6	
45	Balázs Kaizinger	HERR COOLES CLASSICO	Hungary	45.8	16.0	61.8	
46	Giovanni Ugolotti	SWIRLY TEMPTRESS	Italy	25.7	36.4	62.1	
47	Caroline Pamukcu	HSH BLAKE	United States	30.4	32.0	62.4	
48	Peter T. Flarup	FASCINATION	Denmark	32.4	33.6	66.0	
49	Jessica Phoenix	FREEDOM GS	Canada	35.4	32.4	67.8	
50	Esteban Benitez Valle	UTRERA AA 35 1	Spain	39.9	29.0	68.9	
51	Alexander Peternell	FIGARO DES PREMICES	South Africa	39.0	33.2	72.2	
52	Márcio Jorge	CASTLE HOWARD CASANOVA	Brazil	33.3	42.4	75.7	
53	Sanne de Jong	ENJOY	Netherlands	34.8	48.2	83.0	
54	Robert Powała	TOSCA DEL CASTEGNO	Poland	34.7	60.0	94.7	
55	Nicolas Wettstein	ALTIER D'AUROIS	Ecuador	42.3	65.4	107.7	
56	Miroslav Trunda	SHUTTERFLYKE	Czech Republic	53.0	72.0	125.0	
	Kevin Mcnab	DON QUIDAM	Australia	34.9	Retired		
	Ronald Zabala	FOREVER YOUNG WUNDERMASKE	Ecuador	37.7	Eliminated		
	Christoph Wahler	CARJATAN S	Germany	29.4	Eliminated		
	Jan Kaminski	JARD	Poland	35.8	Eliminated		
	Manuel Grave	CARAT DE BREMOY	Portugal	40.9	Eliminated		
	Miloslav Prihoda	FERREOLUS LAT	Czech Republic	35.7	Eliminated		
	Sun Huadong	LADY CHIN V'T MOERVEN Z	China	33.6	Withdrawn		
	Emiliano Portale	FUTURE	Italy	Eliminated			

=== Standings after first jumping round ===
These were the standings after the first jumping round on day 3: The top 25 qualify for the final jumping round with a maximum of 3 riders per Nation (NOC).

Q: qualified for final jumping round

Rank	Rider	Horse	Nationality	Dressage	Cross Country	First Jumping	Total	Notes
1	Michael Jung	CHIPMUNK FRH	Germany	17.8	0.0	4.0	21.8	Q
2	Chris Burton	SHADOW MAN	Australia	22.0	0.0	0.4	22.4	Q
3	Laura Collett	LONDON 52	Great Britain	17.5	0.8	4.8	23.1	Q
4	Tom McEwen	JL DUBLIN	Great Britain	25.8	0.0	0.0	25.8	Q
5	Yoshiaki Oiwa	MGH GRAFTON STREET	Japan	25.5	0.0	0.4	25.9	Q
6	Felix Vogg	DAO DE L'OCEAN	Switzerland	22.1	0.0	4.0	26.1	Q
7	Kazuma Tomoto	VINCI DE LA VIGNE	Japan	27.4	0.0	0.0	27.4	Q
8	Tim Price	FALCO	New Zealand	26.5	2.0	0.0	28.5	Q
9	Stephane Landois	CHAMAN DUMONTCEAU	France	24.4	2.8	4.4	31.6	Q
10	Janneke Boonzaaijer	CHAMP DE TAILLEUR	Netherlands	31.9	0.0	0.0	31.9	Q
11	Julia Krajewski	NICKEL 21	Germany	26.9	4.8	0.4	32.1	Q
12	Boyd Martin	FEDARMAN B	United States	30.5	1.6	0.0	32.1	Q
13	Frida Andersen	BOX LEO	Sweden	33.3	0.0	0.0	33.3	Q
14	Karim Florent Laghouag	TRITON FONTAINE	France	29.6	0.0	4.0	33.6	Q
15	Elisabeth Halliday	NUTCRACKER	United States	28.0	6.0	0.8	34.8	Q
16	Clarke Johnstone	MENLO PARK	New Zealand	25.7	4.8	4.4	34.9	Q
17	Lara de Liedekerke-Meier	ORIGI	Belgium	30.0	1.2	4.4	35.6	Q
18	Karin Donckers	LEIPHEIMER VAN 'T VERAHOF	Belgium	26.6	7.2	4.0	37.8	Q
19	Evelina Bertoli	FIDJY DES MELEZES	Italy	26.6	6.4	5.2	38.2	Q
20	Nicolas Touzaint	DIABOLO MENTHE	France	27.2	3.2	8.0	38.4	Q
21	Austin O'Connor	COLORADO BLUE	Ireland	31.7	0.0	8.0	39.7	Q
22	Shane Rose	VIRGIL	Australia	34.6	2.8	4.4	41.8	Q
23	Rosalind Canter	LORDSHIPS GRAFFALO	Great Britain	23.4	15.0	4.0	42.4	Q
24	Louise Romeike	CASPIAN 15	Sweden	37.7	0.8	5.6	44.1	Q
25	Alex Hua Tian	JILSONNE VAN BAREELHOF	China	22.0	20.6	1.6	44.2	Q
26	Raf Kooremans	RADAR LOVE	Netherlands	27.0	5.6	12.8	45.4	
27	Rafael Losano	WITHINGTON	Brazil	32.4	9.2	5.2	46.8	
28	Tine Magnus	DIA VAN HET LICHTERVELD Z	Belgium	44.0	2.0	4.0	50	
29	Melody Johner	TOUBLEU DE RUEIRE	Switzerland	38.4	3.2	8.8	50.40	
30	Robin Godel	GRANDEUR DE LULLY CH	Switzerland	29.1	9.6	13.2	51.9	
31	Susannah Berry	WELLFIELDS LINCOLN	Ireland	33.0	15.2	4.0	52.2	
32	Karl Slezak	HOT BOBO	Canada	35.8	4.8	12.0	52.6	
33	Sofia Sjöborg	BRYJAMOLGA VH MARIENSHOF	Sweden	33.3	15.0	4.8	53.1	
34	Harald Ambros	VITORIO DU MONTET	Austria	36.5	6.8	10.0	53.3	
35	Michael Winter	EL MUNDO	Canada	35.2	14.4	4.0	53.6	
36	Veera Manninen	SIR GREG	Finland	36.8	18.4	1.2	56.4	
37	Caroline Pamukcu	HSH BLAKE	United States	30.4	32.0	4.4	66.8	
38	Jessica Phoenix	FREEDOM GS	Canada	35.4	32.4	0.0	67.8	
39	Małgorzata Korycka	CANVALENCIA	Poland	39.4	21.2	10.0	70.6	
40	Jonelle Price	HIARADO	New Zealand	30.8	28.4	12.0	71.2	
41	Balázs Kaizinger	HERR COOLES CLASSICO	Hungary	45.8	16.0	10.0	71.8	
42	Peter Flarup	FASCINATION	Denmark	32.4	33.6	9.6	75.6	
43	Alexander Peternell	FIGARO DES PREMICES	South Africa	39.0	33.2	5.6	77.8	
44	Márcio Jorge	CASTLE HOWARD CASANOVA	Brazil	33.3	42.4	4.0	79.7	
45	Noor Slaoui	CASH IN HAND	Morocco	36.4	24.0	20.8	81.2	
46	Giovanni Ugolotti	SWIRLY TEMPTRESS	Italy	25.7	36.4	22.0	84.1	
47	Sanne de Jong	ENJOY	Netherlands	34.8	48.2	5.2	88.2	
48	Robert Powała	TOSCA DEL CASTEGNO	Poland	34.7	60.0	1.6	96.3	
49	Esteban Benitez Valle	UTRERA AA 35 1	Spain	39.9	29	29.2	98.1	
50	Miroslav Trunda	SHUTTERFLYKE	Czech Republic	53.0	72.0	30.0	155.0	
51	Nicolas Wettstein	ALTIER D'AUROIS	Ecuador	42.3	65.4	50.8	158.5	
	Ryuzo Kitajima	CEKATINKA	Japan	34.5	6.4	Eliminated		
	Sarah Ennis	ACTION LADY M	Ireland	38.0	3.2	Eliminated		
	Carlos Diaz	TARAJE CP 21.10	Spain	30.2	17.6	Eliminated		
	Sanna Siltakorpi	BOFEY CLICK	Finland	35.4	20.8	Eliminated		
	Carlos Parro	SAFIRA	Brazil	37.7	22.4	Eliminated		
	Kevin McNab	DON QUIDAM	Australia	34.9	Retired			
	Ronald Zabala	FOREVER YOUNG WUNDERMASKE	Ecuador	37.7	Eliminated			
	Christoph Wahler	CARJATAN S	Germany	29.4	Eliminated			
	Jan Kaminski	JARD	Poland	35.8	Eliminated			
	Manuel Grave	CARAT DE BREMOY	Portugal	40.9	Eliminated			
	Miloslav Prihoda	FERREOLUS LAT	Czech Republic	35.7	Eliminated			
	Sun Huadong	LADY CHIN V'T MOERVEN Z	China	33.6	Eliminated			
	Emiliano Portale	FUTURE	Italy	EL				

=== Final Results after second jumping round ===
These were the final placings following the second jumping round for the top 25 riders:

Rank	Rider	Horse	Nationality	Dressage	Cross Country	Jumping		Total	Notes
Rank	Rider	Horse	Nationality	Dressage	Cross Country	First	Second	Total	Notes
1st place, gold medalist(s)	Michael Jung	CHIPMUNK FRH	Germany	17.8	0.0	4.0	0.0	21.8	
2nd place, silver medalist(s)	Chris Burton	SHADOW MAN	Australia	22.0	0.0	0.4	0.0	22.4	
3rd place, bronze medalist(s)	Laura Collett	LONDON 52	Great Britain	17.5	0.8	4.8	0.0	23.1	
4	Tom McEwen	JL DUBLIN	Great Britain	25.8	0.0	0.0	0.0	25.8	
5	Kazuma Tomoto	VINCI DE LA VIGNE	Japan	27.4	0.0	0.0	0.0	27.4	
6	Tim Price	FALCO	New Zealand	26.5	2.0	0.0	0.0	28.5	
7	Yoshiaki Oiwa	MGH GRAFTON STREET	Japan	25.5	0.0	0.4	4.4	30.3	
8	Felix Vogg	DAO DE L'OCEAN	Switzerland	22.1	0.0	4.0	4.4	30.5	
9	Janneke Boonzaaijer	CHAMP DE TAILLEUR	Netherlands	31.9	0.0	0.0	0.0	31.9	
10	Julia Krajewski	NICKEL 21	Germany	26.9	4.8	0.4	0.0	32.1	
11	Boyd Martin	FEDARMAN B	United States	30.5	1.6	0.0	0.0	32.1	
12	Frida Andersen	BOX LEO	Sweden	33.3	0.0	0.0	0.0	33.3	
13	Stephane Landois	CHAMAN DUMONTCEAU	France	24.4	2.8	4.4	4.0	35.6	
14	Lara de Liedekerke-Meier	ORIGI	Belgium	30.0	1.2	4.4	0.0	35.6	
15	Karim Florent Laghouag	TRITON FONTAINE	France	29.6	0.0	4.0	4.0	37.6	
16	Karin Donckers	LEIPHEIMER VAN 'T VERAHOF	Belgium	26.6	7.2	4.0	0.4	38.2	
17	Nicolas Touzaint	DIABOLO MENTHE	France	27.2	3.2	8.0	0.0	38.4	
18	Austin O'Connor	COLORADO BLUE	Ireland	31.7	0.0	8.0	0.0	39.7	
19	Clarke Johnstone	MENLO PARK	New Zealand	25.7	4.8	4.4	4.8	39.7	
20	Elisabeth Halliday	NUTCRACKER	United States	28.0	6.0	0.8	5.2	40.0	
21	Shane Rose	VIRGIL	Australia	34.6	2.8	4.4	0.0	41.8	
22	Rosalind Canter	LORDSHIPS GRAFFALO	Great Britain	23.4	15.0	4.0	0.0	42.4	
23	Evelina Bertoli	FIDJY DES MELEZES	Italy	26.6	6.4	5.2	4.4	42.6	
24	Louise Romeike	CASPIAN 15	Sweden	37.7	0.8	5.6	0.4	44.5	
25	Alex Hua Tian	JILSONNE VAN BAREELHOF	China	22.0	20.6	1.6	8.0	52.2	
