= Equestrian at the 2024 Summer Olympics – Team eventing =

Team eventing at the Games of the XXXIII Olympiad
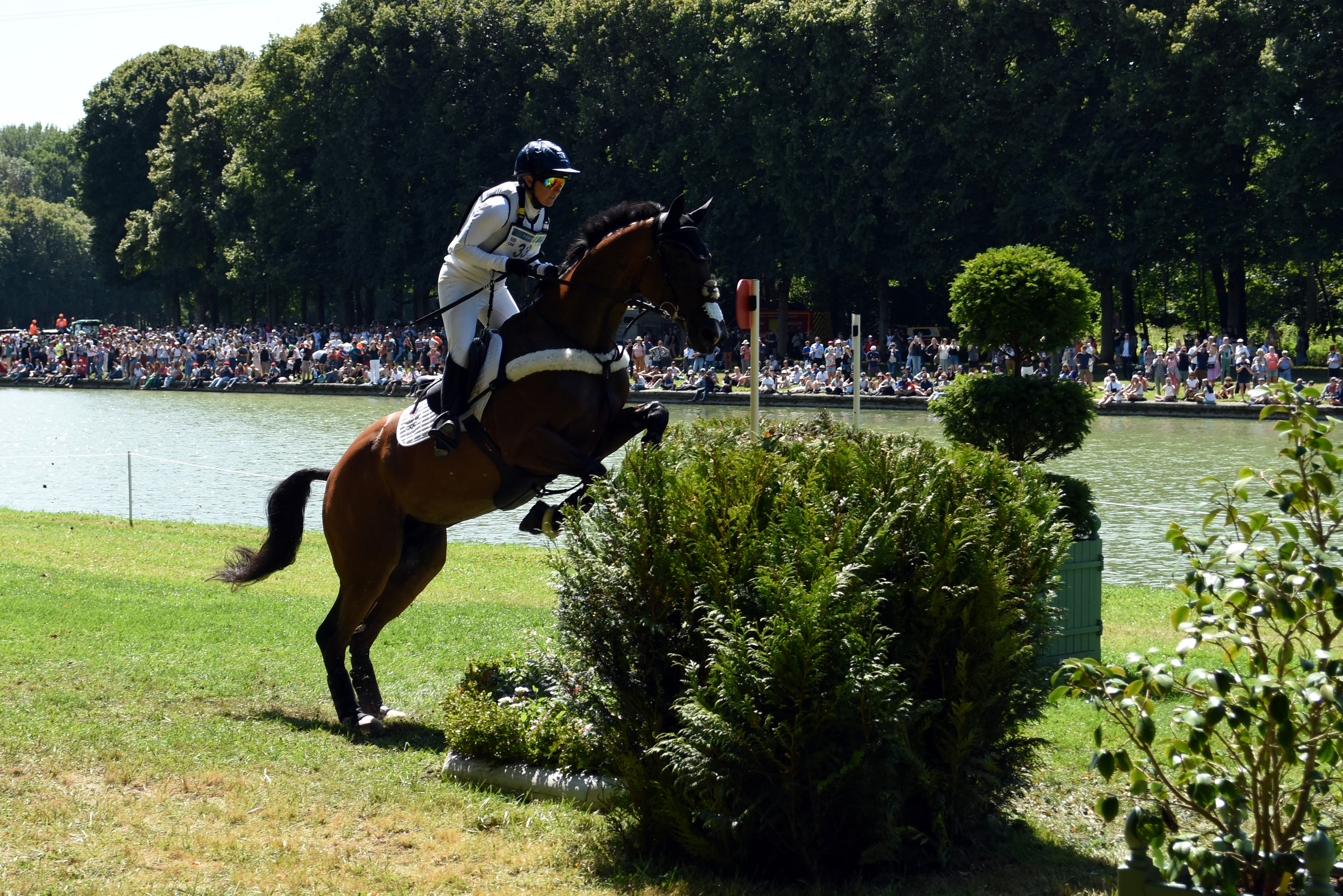
- Collett and London 52 vault over the Le Jardin à la Française obstacle during the cross country run
- Venue: Palace of Versailles
- Date: 27 - 29 July 2024
- Competitors: 48 from 16 nations

Medalists
| 1st place, gold medalist(s) | | Laura Collett; Tom McEwen; Rosalind Canter | Great Britain |
| 2nd place, silver medalist(s) | | Nicolas Touzaint; Karim Laghouag; Stephane Landois | France |
| 3rd place, bronze medalist(s) | | Kazuma Tomoto; Yoshiaki Oiwa; Ryuzo Kitajima; Toshiyuki Tanaka | Japan |

The team eventing event at the 2024 Summer Olympics took place from 27 to 29 July 2024 at the Palace of Versailles.

Like all other equestrian events, the eventing competition is open-gender, with both male and female athletes competing in the same division. 48 riders (16 teams of 3) from 16 nations took part. The defending champions, Great Britain, retained their title from 2021, with Laura Collett and Tom McEwen winning their second team gold medals. Home team France took silver, with Japan taking the bronze.

== Background ==
This was the 26th appearance of the event, which has been held at every Summer Olympics since it was introduced in 1912.

The reigning Olympic champions were Great Britain. with World individual champion Rosalind Canter joining Tom McEwen and Laura Collett from the 2020 team.

== Competition format ==
The eventing competition features all 48 riders competing in three rounds (dressage, cross-country, and jumping). Scores from all 3 riders on each team are summed to give a team score; the number of team members was reduced from 4 in 2016 to 3, with there no longer being a dropped score.

- Dressage test: A shortened dressage competition, with penalties based on the dressage score
- Cross-country test: A race over a 4.5 kilometre cross-country course. The time allotted is 8 minutes (570 metres per minute), with penalties assessed for exceeding that time. There are a maximum of 38 obstacles, with penalties assessed for faults. Staggered starts.
- Jumping test: A 600-metre show jumping course, with 11 or 12 obstacles (including double and triple jumps, with a maximum of 16 jumps total). Maximum height of obstacles is 1.25 metres. The required speed is 375 metres/minute (time limit of 1:36). Penalties are assessed for exceeding the time limit and for faults at the obstacles.

== Schedule ==
The event takes place over three days, beginning with the dressage followed by cross-country and jumping on the next two days.

| Day | Date | Phase |
|---|---|---|
| Day 1 | 27 July 2024 | Dressage |
| Day 2 | 28 July 2024 | Cross Country |
| Day 3 | 29 July 2024 | Jumping |

== Results ==
=== Standings after dressage ===
These were the team standings after dressage on day 1:

| Rank | Country | Athlete | Horse | Dressage | |
| Rank | Country | Athlete | Horse | Penalties | Team Total |
|---|---|---|---|---|---|
| 1 | Great Britain | Rosalind Canter | LORDSHIPS GRAFFALO | 23.4 | 66.7 |
| 1 | Great Britain | Tom McEwen | JL DUBLIN | 25.8 | 66.7 |
| 1 | Great Britain | Laura Collett | LONDON 52 | 17.5 | 66.7 |
| 2 | Germany | Christoph Wahler | CARJATAN S | 29.4 | 74.1 |
| 2 | Germany | Julia Krajewski | NICKEL 21 | 26.9 | 74.1 |
| 2 | Germany | Michael Jung | CHIPMUNK FRH | 17.8 | 74.1 |
| 3 | France | Nicolas Touzaint | DIABOLO MENTHE | 27.2 | 81.2 |
| 3 | France | Karim Laghouag | TRITON FONTAINE | 29.6 | 81.2 |
| 3 | France | Stephane Landois | CHAMAN DUMONTCEAU | 24.4 | 81.2 |
| 4 | New Zealand | Jonelle Price | HIARADO | 30.8 | 83 |
| 4 | New Zealand | Clarke Johnstone | MENLO PARK | 25.7 | 83 |
| 4 | New Zealand | Tim Price | FALCO | 26.5 | 83 |
| 5 | Japan | Kazuma Tomoto | VINCI DE LA VIGNE | 27.4 | 87.4 |
| 5 | Japan | Yoshiaki Oiwa | MGH GRAFTON STREET | 25.5 | 87.4 |
| 5 | Japan | Ryuzo Kitajima | CEKATINKA | 34.5 | 87.4 |
| 6 | United States | Caroline Pamukcu | HSH BLAKE | 30.4 | 88.9 |
| 6 | United States | Elisabeth Halliday | NUTCRACKER | 28 | 88.9 |
| 6 | United States | Boyd Martin | FEDARMAN B | 30.5 | 88.9 |
| 7 | Switzerland | Melody Johner | TOUBLEU DE RUEIRE | 38.4 | 89.6 |
| 7 | Switzerland | Robin Godel | GRANDEUR DE LULLY CH | 29.1 | 89.6 |
| 7 | Switzerland | Felix Vogg | DAO DE L'OCEAN | 22.1 | 89.6 |
| 8 | Australia | Shane Rose | VIRGIL | 34.6 | 91.5 |
| 8 | Australia | Chris Burton | SHADOW MAN | 22 | 91.5 |
| 8 | Australia | Kevin McNab | DON QUIDAM | 34.9 | 91.5 |
| 9 | Netherlands | Sanne de Jong | ENJOY | 34.8 | 93.7 |
| 9 | Netherlands | Raf Kooremans | RADAR LOVE | 27 | 93.7 |
| 9 | Netherlands | Janneke Boonzjaaijer | CHAMP DE TAILLEUR | 31.9 | 93.7 |
| 10 | Belgium | Tine Magnus | DIA VAN HET LICHTERVELD Z | 44 | 100.6 |
| 10 | Belgium | Karin Donckers | LEIPHEIMER VAN 'T VERAHOF | 26.6 | 100.6 |
| 10 | Belgium | Lara de Liedekerke-Meier | ORIGI | 30 | 100.6 |
| 11 | Ireland | Susie Berry | WELLFIELDS LINCOLN | 33 | 102.7 |
| 11 | Ireland | Austin O'Connor | COLORADO BLUE | 31.7 | 102.7 |
| 11 | Ireland | Sarah Ennis | ACTION LADY M | 38 | 102.7 |
| 12 | Brazil | Marcio Carvalho Jorge | CASTLE HOWARD CASANOVA | 33.3 | 103.4 |
| 12 | Brazil | Rafael Losano | WITHINGTON | 32.4 | 103.4 |
| 12 | Brazil | Carlos Parro | SAFIRA | 37.7 | 103.4 |
| 13 | Sweden | Sofia Sjoberg | BRYJAMOLGA VH MARIENSHOF | 33.3 | 104.3 |
| 13 | Sweden | Louise Romeike | CASPIAN 15 | 37.7 | 104.3 |
| 13 | Sweden | Frida Andersen | BOX LEO | 33.3 | 104.3 |
| 14 | Canada | Jessica Phoenix | FREEDOM GS | 35.4 | 106.4 |
| 14 | Canada | Mike Winter | EL MUNDO | 35.2 | 106.4 |
| 14 | Canada | Karl Slezak | HOT BOBO | 35.8 | 106.4 |
| 15 | Poland | Robert Powala | TOSCA DEL CASTEGNO | 34.7 | 109.9 |
| 15 | Poland | Malgorzata Korycka | CANVALENCIA | 39.4 | 109.9 |
| 15 | Poland | Jan Kaminski | JARD | 35.8 | 109.9 |
| 16 | Italy | Giovanni Ugolotti | SWIRLY TEMPTRESS | 25.7 | 152.3 |
| 16 | Italy | Evelina Bertoli | FIDJY DES MELEZES | 26.6 | 152.3 |
| 16 | Italy | Emiliano Portale | FUTURE | 100 | 152.3 |

=== Standings after cross-country ===
These were the team standings after the cross-country round on day 2:

| Rank | Country | Athlete | Horse | Dressage | | Cross Country | | Total |
| Rank | Country | Athlete | Horse | Penalties | Team Total | Penalties | Team Total | Total |
|---|---|---|---|---|---|---|---|---|
| 1 | Great Britain | Rosalind Canter | LORDSHIPS GRAFFALO | 23.4 | 66.7 | 15 | 15.8 | 82.5 |
| 1 | Great Britain | Tom McEwen | JL DUBLIN | 25.8 | 66.7 | 0 | 15.8 | 82.5 |
| 1 | Great Britain | Laura Collett | LONDON 52 | 17.5 | 66.7 | 0.8 | 15.8 | 82.5 |
| 2 | France | Nicolas Touzaint | DIABOLO MENTHE | 27.2 | 81.2 | 3.2 | 6 | 87.8 |
| 2 | France | Karim Laghouag | TRITON FONTAINE | 29.6 | 81.2 | 0 | 6 | 87.8 |
| 2 | France | Stephane Landois | CHAMAN DUMONTCEAU | 24.4 | 81.2 | 2.8 | 6 | 87.8 |
| 3 | Japan | Kazuma Tomoto | VINCI DE LA VIGNE | 27.4 | 87.4 | 0 | 6.4 | 93.8 |
| 3 | Japan | Yoshiaki Oiwa | MGH GRAFTON STREET | 25.5 | 87.4 | 0 | 6.4 | 93.8 |
| 3 | Japan | Ryuzo Kitajima | CEKATINKA | 34.5 | 87.4 | 6.4 | 6.4 | 93.8 |
| 4 | Switzerland | Melody Johner | TOUBLEU DE RUEIRE | 38.4 | 89.6 | 3.2 | 12.8 | 102.4 |
| 4 | Switzerland | Robin Godel | GRANDEUR DE LULLY CH | 29.1 | 89.6 | 9.6 | 12.8 | 102.4 |
| 4 | Switzerland | Felix Vogg | DAO DE L'OCEAN | 22.1 | 89.6 | 0 | 12.8 | 102.4 |
| 5 | Belgium | Tine Magnus | DIA VAN HET LICHTERVELD Z | 44 | 100.6 | 2 | 10.4 | 111.0 |
| 5 | Belgium | Karin Donckers | LEIPHEIMER VAN 'T VERAHOF | 26.6 | 100.6 | 7.2 | 10.4 | 111.0 |
| 5 | Belgium | Lara de Liedekerke-Meier | ORIGI | 30 | 100.6 | 1.2 | 10.4 | 111.0 |
| 6 | New Zealand | Jonelle Price | HIARADO | 30.8 | 83 | 28.4 | 35.2 | 118.2 |
| 6 | New Zealand | Clarke Johnstone | MENLO PARK | 25.7 | 83 | 4.8 | 35.2 | 118.2 |
| 6 | New Zealand | Tim Price | FALCO | 26.5 | 83 | 2 | 35.2 | 118.2 |
| 7 | Sweden | Sofia Sjoberg | BRYJAMOLGA VH MARIENSHOF | 33.3 | 104.3 | 15 | 15.8 | 120.1 |
| 7 | Sweden | Louise Romeike | CASPIAN 15 | 37.7 | 104.3 | 0.8 | 15.8 | 120.1 |
| 7 | Sweden | Frida Andersen | BOX LEO | 33.3 | 104.3 | 0 | 15.8 | 120.1 |
| 8 | Ireland | Susie Berry | WELLFIELDS LINCOLN | 33 | 102.7 | 15.2 | 18.4 | 121.1 |
| 8 | Ireland | Austin O'Connor | COLORADO BLUE | 31.7 | 102.7 | 0 | 18.4 | 121.1 |
| 8 | Ireland | Sarah Ennis | ACTION LADY M | 38 | 102.7 | 3.2 | 18.4 | 121.1 |
| 9 | United States | Caroline Pamukcu | HSH BLAKE | 30.4 | 88.9 | 32 | 39.6 | 128.5 |
| 9 | United States | Elisabeth Halliday | NUTCRACKER | 28 | 88.9 | 6 | 39.6 | 128.5 |
| 9 | United States | Boyd Martin | FEDARMAN B | 30.5 | 88.9 | 1.6 | 39.6 | 128.5 |
| 10 | Netherlands | Sanne de Jong | ENJOY | 34.8 | 93.7 | 48.2 | 53.8 | 147.5 |
| 10 | Netherlands | Raf Kooremans | RADAR LOVE | 27 | 93.7 | 5.6 | 53.8 | 147.5 |
| 10 | Netherlands | Janneke Boonzjaaijer | CHAMP DE TAILLEUR | 31.9 | 93.7 | 0 | 53.8 | 147.5 |
| 11 | Canada | Jessica Phoenix | FREEDOM GS | 35.4 | 106.4 | 32.4 | 51.6 | 158.0 |
| 11 | Canada | Mike Winter | EL MUNDO | 35.2 | 106.4 | 14.4 | 51.6 | 158.0 |
| 11 | Canada | Karl Slezak | HOT BOBO | 35.8 | 106.4 | 4.8 | 51.6 | 158.0 |
| 12 | Brazil | Marcio Carvalho Jorge | CASTLE HOWARD CASANOVA | 33.3 | 103.4 | 42.4 | 74 | 177.4 |
| 12 | Brazil | Rafael Losano | WITHINGTON | 32.4 | 103.4 | 9.2 | 74 | 177.4 |
| 12 | Brazil | Carlos Parro | SAFIRA | 37.7 | 103.4 | 22.4 | 74 | 177.4 |
| 13 | Italy | Pietro Sandei | RUBIS DE PRERE | | 152.3 | 14 | 76.8 | 229.1 |
| 13 | Italy | Giovanni Ugolotti | SWIRLY TEMPTRESS | 25.7 | 152.3 | 36.4 | 76.8 | 229.1 |
| 13 | Italy | Evelina Bertoli | FIDJY DES MELEZES | 26.6 | 152.3 | 6.4 | 76.8 | 229.1 |
| 13 | Italy | Emiliano Portale | FUTURE | 100 | 152.3 | | 76.8 | 229.1 |
| 13 | Italy | Replacement Penalty | | 20 | | | | 229.1 |
| 14 | Germany | Christoph Wahler | CARJATAN S | 29.4 | 74.1 | 200 | 204.8 | 278.9 |
| 14 | Germany | Julia Krajewski | NICKEL 21 | 26.9 | 74.1 | 4.8 | 204.8 | 278.9 |
| 14 | Germany | Michael Jung | CHIPMUNK FRH | 17.8 | 74.1 | 0 | 204.8 | 278.9 |
| 15 | Australia | Shane Rose | VIRGIL | 34.6 | 91.5 | 2.8 | 202.8 | 294.3 |
| 15 | Australia | Chris Burton | SHADOW MAN | 22 | 91.5 | 0 | 202.8 | 294.3 |
| 15 | Australia | Kevin McNab | DON QUIDAM | 34.9 | 91.5 | 200 | 202.8 | 294.3 |
| 16 | Poland | Robert Powala | TOSCA DEL CASTEGNO | 34.7 | 109.9 | 60 | 281.2 | 391.1 |
| 16 | Poland | Malgorzata Korycka | CANVALENCIA | 39.4 | 109.9 | 21.2 | 281.2 | 391.1 |
| 16 | Poland | Jan Kaminski | JARD | 35.8 | 109.9 | 200 | 281.2 | 391.1 |

=== Standings after jumping: final result ===
These were the final standings after the first jumping round on the morning of day 3:

| Rank | Country | Athlete | Horse | Dressage | | Cross Country | | Jumping | | Total |
| Rank | Country | Athlete | Horse | Penalties | Team Total | Penalties | Team Total | Penalties | Team Total | Total |
|---|---|---|---|---|---|---|---|---|---|---|
| 1st place, gold medalist(s) | Great Britain | Rosalind Canter | LORDSHIPS GRAFFALO | 23.4 | 66.7 | 15 | 15.8 | 4 | 8.8 | 91.3 |
| 1st place, gold medalist(s) | Great Britain | Tom McEwen | JL DUBLIN | 25.8 | 66.7 | 0 | 15.8 | 0 | 8.8 | 91.3 |
| 1st place, gold medalist(s) | Great Britain | Laura Collett | LONDON 52 | 17.5 | 66.7 | 0.8 | 15.8 | 4.8 | 8.8 | 91.3 |
| 2nd place, silver medalist(s) | France | Nicolas Touzaint | DIABOLO MENTHE | 27.2 | 81.2 | 3.2 | 6 | 8 | 16.4 | 103.6 |
| 2nd place, silver medalist(s) | France | Karim Laghouag | TRITON FONTAINE | 29.6 | 81.2 | 0 | 6 | 4 | 16.4 | 103.6 |
| 2nd place, silver medalist(s) | France | Stephane Landois | CHAMAN DUMONTCEAU | 24.4 | 81.2 | 2.8 | 6 | 4.4 | 16.4 | 103.6 |
| 3rd place, bronze medalist(s) | Japan | Toshiyuki Tanaka | JEFFERSON | | 87.4 | | 6.4 | 1.6 | 2 | 115.8 |
| 3rd place, bronze medalist(s) | Japan | Kazuma Tomoto | VINCI DE LA VIGNE | 27.4 | 87.4 | 0 | 6.4 | 0 | 2 | 115.8 |
| 3rd place, bronze medalist(s) | Japan | Yoshiaki Oiwa | MGH GRAFTON STREET | 25.5 | 87.4 | 0 | 6.4 | 0.4 | 2 | 115.8 |
| 3rd place, bronze medalist(s) | Japan | Ryuzo Kitajima | CEKATINKA | 34.5 | 87.4 | 6.4 | 6.4 | | 2 | 115.8 |
| 3rd place, bronze medalist(s) | Japan | Replacement Penalty | | 20 | | | | | | 115.8 |
| 4 | Switzerland | Melody Johner | TOUBLEU DE RUEIRE | 38.4 | 89.6 | 3.2 | 12.8 | 8.8 | 26 | 128.4 |
| 4 | Switzerland | Robin Godel | GRANDEUR DE LULLY CH | 29.1 | 89.6 | 9.6 | 12.8 | 13.2 | 26 | 128.4 |
| 4 | Switzerland | Felix Vogg | DAO DE L'OCEAN | 22.1 | 89.6 | 0 | 12.8 | 4 | 26 | 128.4 |
| 5 | Sweden | Sofia Sjoberg | BRYJAMOLGA VH MARIENSHOF | 33.3 | 104.3 | 15 | 15.8 | 4.8 | 10.4 | 130.5 |
| 5 | Sweden | Louise Romeike | CASPIAN 15 | 37.7 | 104.3 | 0.8 | 15.8 | 5.6 | 10.4 | 130.5 |
| 5 | Sweden | Frida Andersen | BOX LEO | 33.3 | 104.3 | 0 | 15.8 | 0 | 10.4 | 130.5 |
| 6 | United States | Caroline Pamukcu | HSH BLAKE | 30.4 | 88.9 | 32 | 39.6 | 4.4 | 5.2 | 133.7 |
| 6 | United States | Elisabeth Halliday | NUTCRACKER | 28 | 88.9 | 6 | 39.6 | 0.8 | 5.2 | 133.7 |
| 6 | United States | Boyd Martin | FEDARMAN B | 30.5 | 88.9 | 1.6 | 39.6 | 0 | 5.2 | 133.7 |
| 7 | New Zealand | Jonelle Price | HIARADO | 30.8 | 83 | 28.4 | 35.2 | 12 | 16.4 | 134.6 |
| 7 | New Zealand | Clarke Johnstone | MENLO PARK | 25.7 | 83 | 4.8 | 35.2 | 4.4 | 16.4 | 134.6 |
| 7 | New Zealand | Tim Price | FALCO | 26.5 | 83 | 2 | 35.2 | 0 | 16.4 | 134.6 |
| 8 | Ireland | Aoife Clark | FREELANCE | | 102.7 | | 18.4 | 4 | 16 | 157.1 |
| 8 | Ireland | Susie Berry | WELLFIELDS LINCOLN | 33 | 102.7 | 15.2 | 18.4 | 4 | 16 | 157.1 |
| 8 | Ireland | Austin O'Connor | COLORADO BLUE | 31.7 | 102.7 | 0 | 18.4 | 8 | 16 | 157.1 |
| 8 | Ireland | Sarah Ennis | ACTION LADY M | 38 | 102.7 | 3.2 | 18.4 | | 16 | 157.1 |
| 8 | Ireland | Replacement Penalty | | 20 | | | | | | 157.1 |
| 9 | Netherlands | Sanne de Jong | ENJOY | 34.8 | 93.7 | 48.2 | 53.8 | 5.2 | 18 | 165.5 |
| 9 | Netherlands | Raf Kooremans | RADAR LOVE | 27 | 93.7 | 5.6 | 53.8 | 12.8 | 18 | 165.5 |
| 9 | Netherlands | Janneke Boonzjaaijer | CHAMP DE TAILLEUR | 31.9 | 93.7 | 0 | 53.8 | 0 | 18 | 165.5 |
| 10 | Canada | Jessica Phoenix | FREEDOM GS | 35.4 | 106.4 | 32.4 | 51.6 | 0 | 16 | 174.0 |
| 10 | Canada | Mike Winter | EL MUNDO | 35.2 | 106.4 | 14.4 | 51.6 | 4 | 16 | 174.0 |
| 10 | Canada | Karl Slezak | HOT BOBO | 35.8 | 106.4 | 4.8 | 51.6 | 12 | 16 | 174.0 |
| 11 | Brazil | Ruy Fonseca | BALLYPATRICK SRS | | 103.4 | | 74 | 8 | 17.2 | 214.6 |
| 11 | Brazil | Marcio Carvalho Jorge | CASTLE HOWARD CASANOVA | 33.3 | 103.4 | 42.4 | 74 | 4 | 17.2 | 214.6 |
| 11 | Brazil | Rafael Losano | WITHINGTON | 32.4 | 103.4 | 9.2 | 74 | 5.2 | 17.2 | 214.6 |
| 11 | Brazil | Carlos Parro | SAFIRA | 37.7 | 103.4 | 22.4 | 74 | | 17.2 | 214.6 |
| 11 | Brazil | Replacement Penalty | | 20 | | | | | | 214.6 |
| 12 | Italy | Pietro Sandei | RUBIS DE PRERE | | 152.3 | 14 | 76.8 | 8.4 | 35.6 | 264.7 |
| 12 | Italy | Giovanni Ugolotti | SWIRLY TEMPTRESS | 25.7 | 152.3 | 36.4 | 76.8 | 22 | 35.6 | 264.7 |
| 12 | Italy | Evelina Bertoli | FIDJY DES MELEZES | 26.6 | 152.3 | 6.4 | 76.8 | 5.2 | 35.6 | 264.7 |
| 12 | Italy | Emiliano Portale | FUTURE | 100 | 152.3 | | 76.8 | | 35.6 | 264.7 |
| 12 | Italy | Replacement Penalty | | 20 | | | | | | 264.7 |
| 13 | Germany | Christoph Wahler | CARJATAN S | 29.4 | 74.1 | 200 | 204.8 | 0 | 4.4 | 283.3 |
| 13 | Germany | Julia Krajewski | NICKEL 21 | 26.9 | 74.1 | 4.8 | 204.8 | 0.4 | 4.4 | 283.3 |
| 13 | Germany | Michael Jung | CHIPMUNK FRH | 17.8 | 74.1 | 0 | 204.8 | 4 | 4.4 | 283.3 |
| 14 | Australia | Shenae Lowings | BOLD VENTURE | | 91.5 | | 202.8 | 9.2 | 14 | 328.3 |
| 14 | Australia | Shane Rose | VIRGIL | 34.6 | 91.5 | 2.8 | 202.8 | 4.4 | 14 | 328.3 |
| 14 | Australia | Chris Burton | SHADOW MAN | 22 | 91.5 | 0 | 202.8 | 0.4 | 14 | 328.3 |
| 14 | Australia | Kevin McNab | DON QUIDAM | 34.9 | 91.5 | 200 | 202.8 | | 14 | 328.3 |
| 14 | Australia | Replacement Penalty | | 20 | | | | | | 328.3 |
| 15 | Poland | Wiktoria Knap | QUINTUS 134 | | 109.9 | | 281.2 | 22.8 | 34.4 | 445.5 |
| 15 | Poland | Robert Powala | TOSCA DEL CASTEGNO | 34.7 | 109.9 | 60 | 281.2 | 1.6 | 34.4 | 445.5 |
| 15 | Poland | Malgorzata Korycka | CANVALENCIA | 39.4 | 109.9 | 21.2 | 281.2 | 10 | 34.4 | 445.5 |
| 15 | Poland | Jan Kaminski | JARD | 35.8 | 109.9 | 200 | 281.2 | | 34.4 | 445.5 |
| 15 | Poland | Replacement Penalty | | 20 | | | | | | 445.5 |
| DQ | Belgium | Tine Magnus | DIA VAN HET LICHTERVELD Z | 44 | ~~100.6~~ | 2 | ~~10.4~~ | 4 | ~~12.4~~ | ~~123.4~~ |
| DQ | Belgium | Karin Donckers | LEIPHEIMER VAN 'T VERAHOF | 26.6 | ~~100.6~~ | 7.2 | ~~10.4~~ | 4 | ~~12.4~~ | ~~123.4~~ |
| DQ | Belgium | Lara de Liedekerke-Meier | ORIGI | 30 | ~~100.6~~ | 1.2 | ~~10.4~~ | 4.4 | ~~12.4~~ | ~~123.4~~ |

Although Belgium placed 4th overall when the event has held, on 4 September 2024 the team was provisionally suspended for anti-doping violation relating to a positive test for trazodone on Tine Magnus's horse Dia Van Het Lichterveld Z. In February 2025, the FEI disqualified the team's results following the a determination of "no significant fault or negliance" as the source of the banned substance was a contaminated supplement administered by the team vet.
