= Korycki =

Korycki (feminine: Korycka; plural: Koryccy) is a Polish surname. Notable people with the surname include:

- Małgorzata Korycka (born 1992), Polish equestrian
- Waldemar Korycki (born 1946), Polish sprinter
