= Pietro Sandei =

Italian equestrian (born 1991)

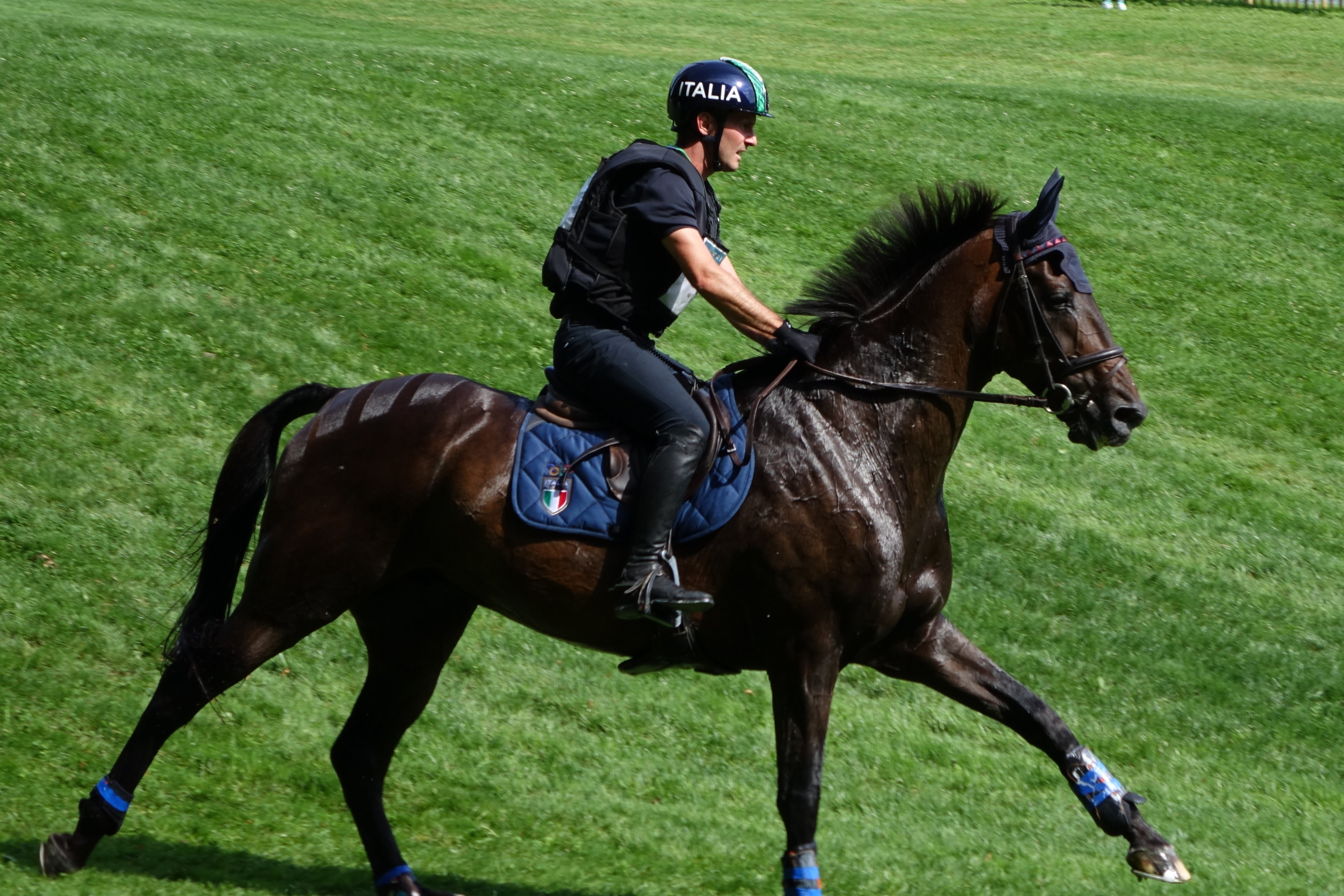
- Sandei at the 2024 Olympics

Personal information
- Discipline: Eventing
- Born: 20 December 1991 (age 33); Parma, Italy
- Horse(s): Rubis de Prere
Medal record
Equestrian eventing
Representing Italy
European Championships
Bronze medal – third place	2017 Strzegom	Team eventing

Pietro Sandei (born 20 December 1991 in Parma, Italy) is an Olympic Italian eventing rider.

== Career ==
He competed at the 2017 and 2021 European Championships and at the 2018 FEI World Equestrian Games in Tryon. In 2017 he won team bronze on the horse Rubis de Prere.

Sandei represented the Italian eventing team at the 2024 Summer Olympics in Paris with Rubis de Prere. He was initially reserve member, but stepped in at the cross-country course after Emiliano Portale got eliminated in the dressage test.
