= Esteban Benítez Valle =

Spanish equestrian (born 1983)

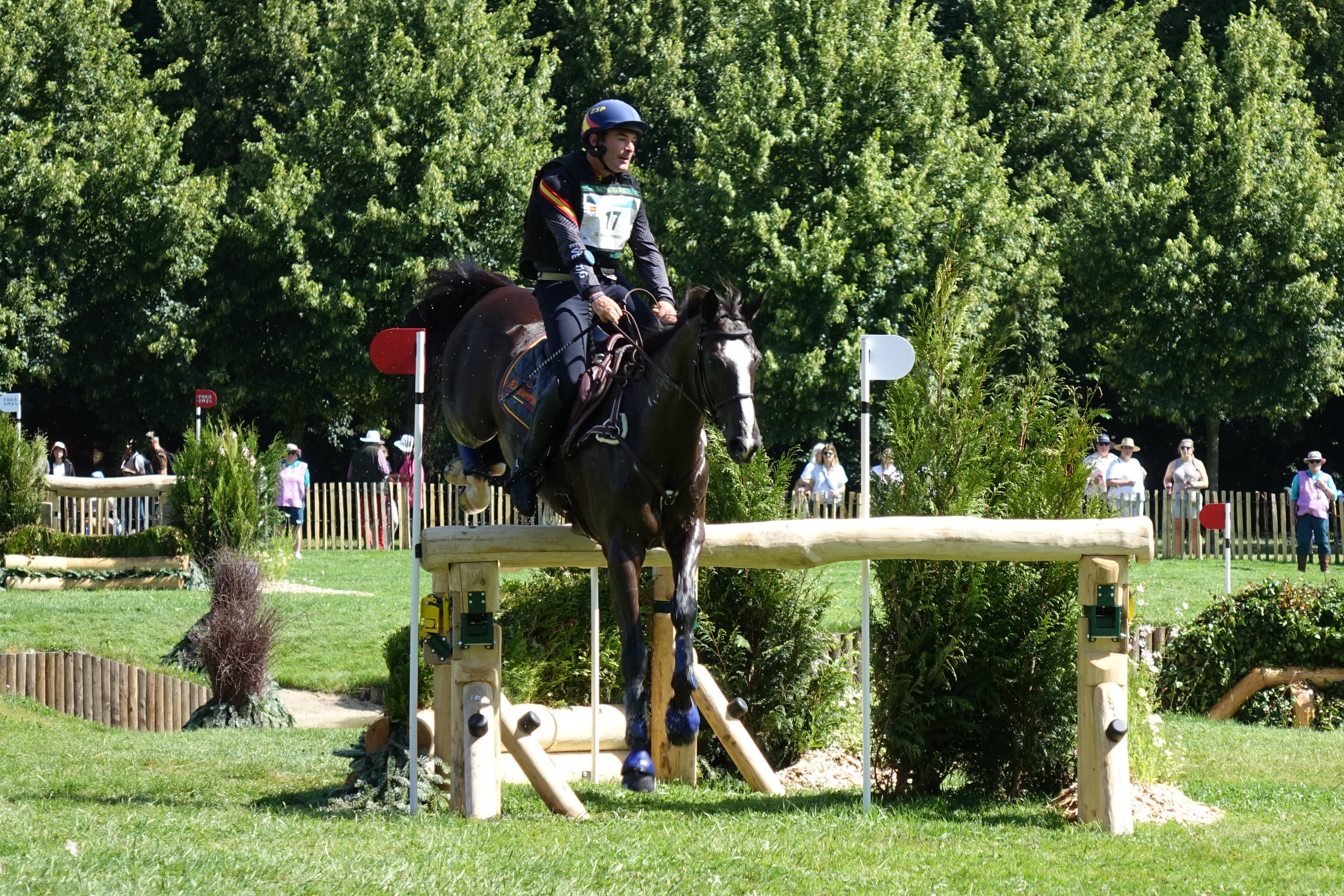
- Benítez Valle at the 2024 Olympics

Personal information
- Nationality: Spanish
- Born: 4 November 1991 (age 34) Cádiz, Spain
- Height: 1.88 m (6 ft 2 in)
- Weight: 77 kg (170 lb)

Achievements and titles
- Olympic finals: Paris 2024

Esteban Benítez Valle (born 4 November 1991) is a Spanish eventing rider.

He competed at the 2024 Summer Olympics in Paris, France, in the individual competition, where he finished 49th. He also competed at the World Championships in 2022 and at the European Championships in 2017, 2019 and 2021.
