= Adelaide Equestrian Festival =

Annual equestrian event in Adelaide, South Australia

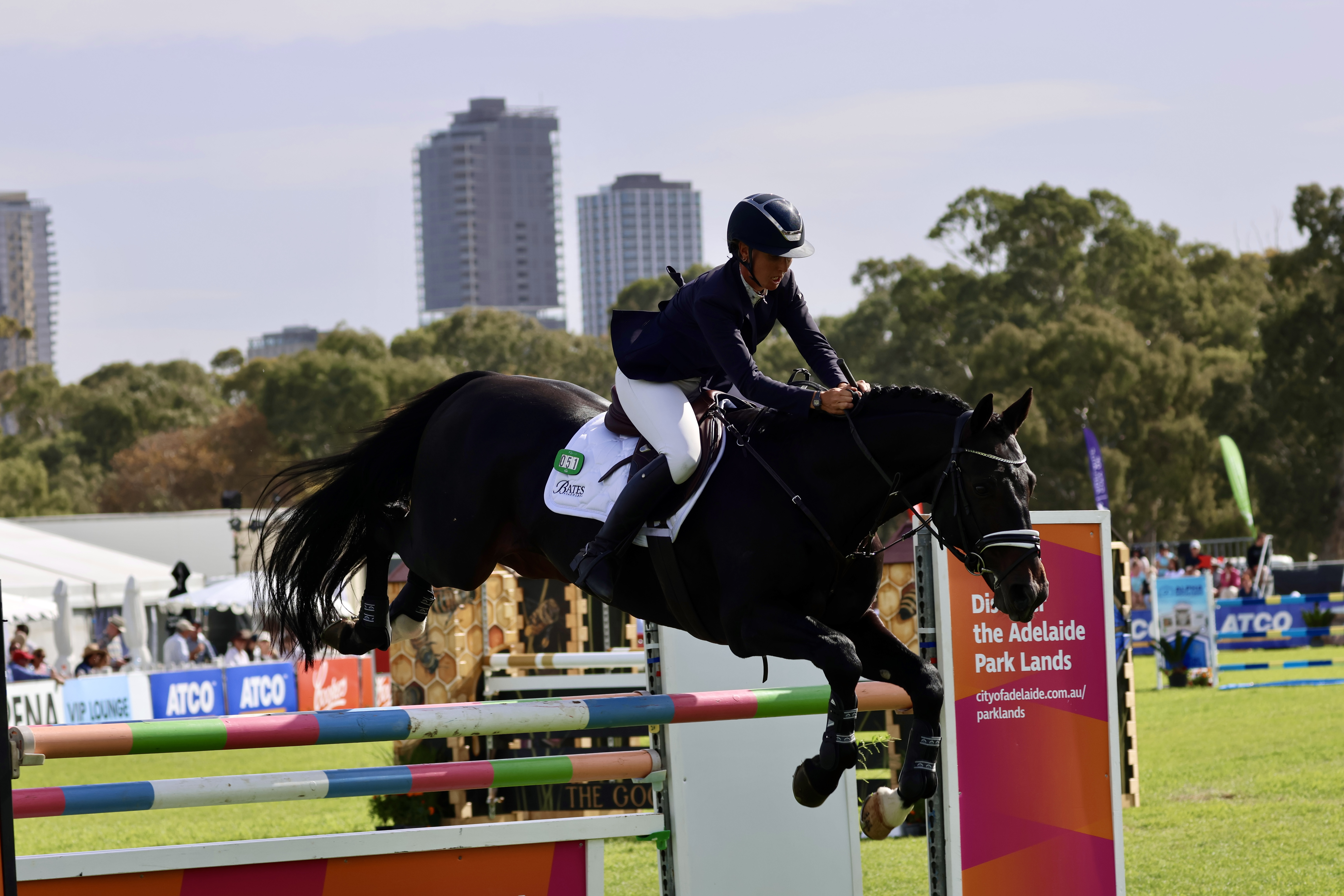
2025 Adelaide Equestrian Festival

The Adelaide Equestrian Festival (AEF) is an annual three-day event held in the eastern Adelaide Park Lands, which border Adelaide city centre. It was known as the Australian International Three Day Event until 2022. A CCI5* event, the top rating by the Fédération Équestre Internationale, it comprises dressage, cross-country, and show-jumping and is usually staged in late April.

== History ==
Logo 2007 - 2022

The Adelaide International Horse Trials was created in 1997 to replace the Gawler Horse Trials that had been staged in Gawler, north of Adelaide, since 1954. In its period as the Gawler Trials, it was a successful competition that hosted significant events.

The new 1997 event in the East Parklands began with a CCI3* (3-star) rating, but was subsequently upgraded to CCI4* in 2002, becoming the only such event in the Southern Hemisphere.

In 2004, it was known as the Mitsubishi Adelaide International Horse Trials, being sponsored by Mitsubishi.

In 2007, to celebrate its 10th anniversary and better reflect its international focus, the event was renamed the Australian International Three Day Event, and was held at the end of November each year. From 2011 the Australian International became part of the FEI (Fédération Équestre Internationale) Classics series of events, for three years sponsored by HSBC.

In 2019, the event was upgraded to CCI5* status.

In 2022 the event was renamed the Adelaide Equestrian Festival and held in April each year.

== Governance ==
The AEF is owned and run by Adelaide Horse Trials Management Inc., and is supported by the South Australian Government through the South Australian Tourism Commission.

== Event ==
The event is held throughout the East Parklands in separate stages over three days. It is classified as a CCI5* by the international governing body FEI, meaning it is the highest level of eventing competition under the FEI banner. As of 2024 it is one of seven such events globally, with others located in the UK, France, Germany, and the US.

The event is unique in being held in a city-centre, taking place in the Adelaide Park Lands.

The dressage phase is held on Friday on the arena in front of the heritage-listed Victoria Park Grandstand. The cross-country phase is held on Saturday across the park lands and attracts the most spectators. The course starts in the arena in front of the grandstand, crosses Wakefield Road to Ityamai-itpina / King Rodney Park (Park 15) and then crosses Bartels Road into Rymill Park / Murlawirrapurka (Park 14) and then returns to the arena again.

The cross-country course has been designed by Michael Etherington-Smith, who has designed courses for the Olympics in 2000 and 2008 and other CCI5* events, and more recently, by Australian Wayne Copping. The water jumps in Rymill Park are challenging in international competition.

As of 2024, the event is used to select the Australian team for the 2024 Summer Olympics in Paris.

== Winners ==
Year	Rider	Horse	Notes
1997	Nick Larkin (NZL)	Red	Run as a CCI***
1998	Peter Haynes (AUS)	Alcheringa	Run as a CCI***
1999	Natalie Blundell (AUS)	Billy Bathgate	
2000	David Middleton (AUS)	Willowbank Jack	
2001	Matthew Grayling (NZL)	Revo	
2002	Wendy Schaeffer (AUS)	Koyuna Sun Gio	
2003	Boyd Martin (AUS)	True Blue Toozac	Martin now rides for the United States
2004	Shane Rose (AUS)	Beauford Miss Dior	
2005	Megan Jones (AUS)	Kirby Park Irish Jester	
2006	Heath Ryan (AUS)	Flame	
2007	No Event Held		Outbreaks of Equine Influenza interrupted all equestrian activities in Australia in 2007
2008	Chris Burton (AUS)	Newsprint	
2009	Stuart Tinney (AUS)	Vettori	
2010	Wendy Schaeffer (AUS)	Koyuna Sun Dancer	
2011	Stuart Tinney (AUS)	Panamera	
2012	Craig Barrett (AUS)	Sandhills Brillaire	
2013	Chris Burton (AUS)	TS Jamaimo	
2014	Jessica Manson (AUS)	Legal Star	
2015	Shane Rose (AUS)	CP Qualified	
2016	Hazel Shannon (AUS)	Willingapark Clifford	
2017	Clarke Johnstone (NZL)	Balmoral Sensation	
2018	Hazel Shannon (AUS)	Willingapark Clifford	
2019	Hazel Shannon (AUS)	Willingapark Clifford	First combination to win three times
2020	No event held		COVID-19 pandemic
2021	No event held		COVID-19 Pandemic
2022	No event held		Event moved to April 2023
2023	Shane Rose (AUS)	Virgil	
2024	David Middleton (AUS)	WEC In The Money	

== See also ==
Other five-star events include:

- Badminton Horse Trials
- Burghley Horse Trials
- Kentucky Three-Day Event
- Luhmühlen Horse Trials
- Stars of Pau
