= Clarke Johnstone =

New Zealand equestrian (born 1987)

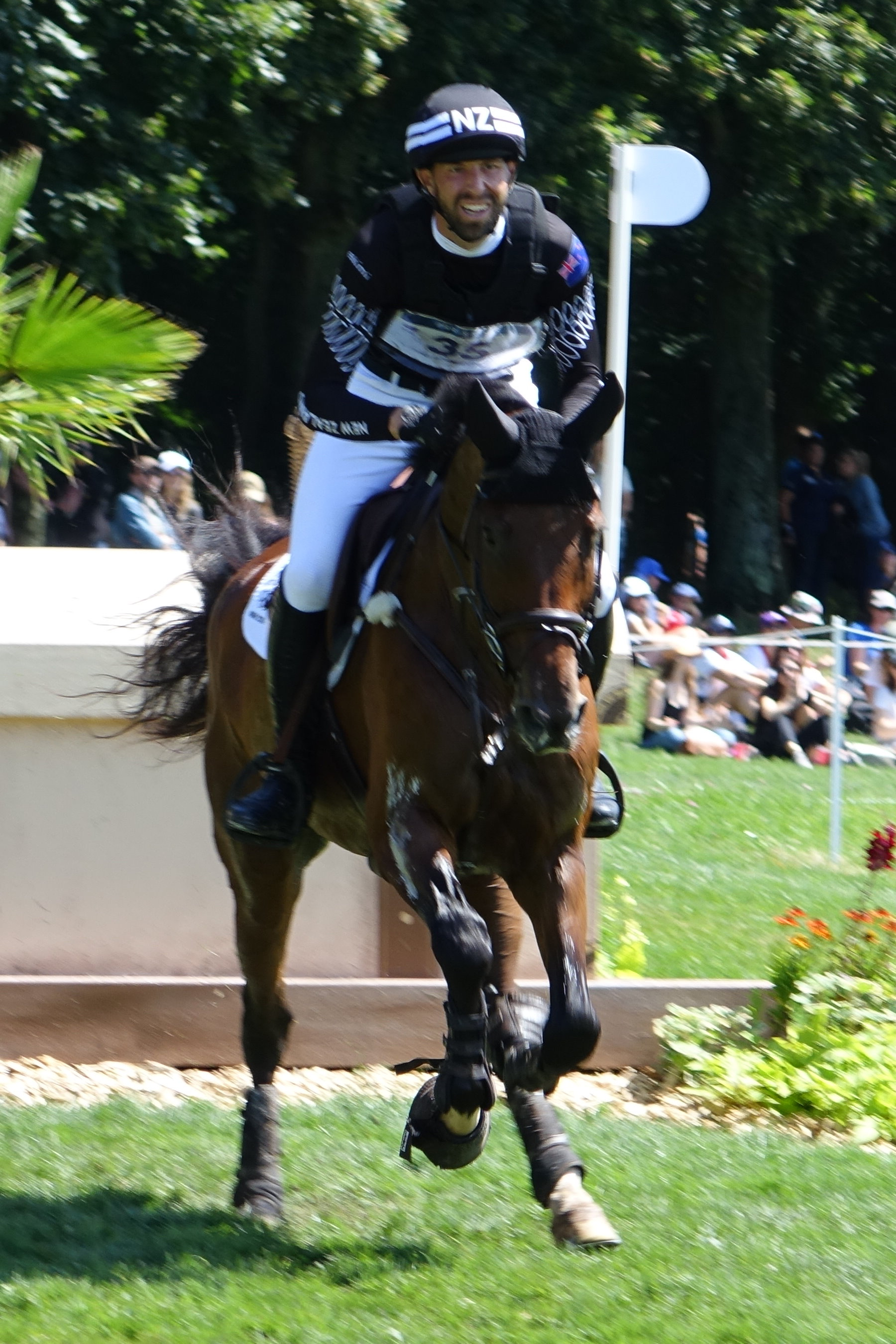
- Johnstone at the 2024 Olympics

Personal information
- Born: 26 April 1987 (age 39) Dunedin, New Zealand
- Height: 191 cm (6 ft 3 in)

Sport
- Country: New Zealand
- Sport: Equestrian
- Event: Eventing
Medal record
Equestrian
Representing New Zealand
World Championships
Bronze medal – third place	2010 Kentucky	Team Eventing
Bronze medal – third place	2022 Pratoni	Team eventing

Clarke Johnstone (born 26 April 1987) is a New Zealand equestrian, competing in eventing.

Johnstone was born in 1987 in Dunedin and grew up on a farm in Otago. From 2000 to 2004, he attended John McGlashan College in Dunedin. In 2008, he obtained a Bachelor of Commerce from the University of Otago. After university, he moved to Matangi near Hamilton in the Waikato, but lived in England between May 2011 and 2013 lived in England in preparation for the London Olympics.

He took up horse riding aged 12 when his sister talked him into it. At the 2010 FEI World Equestrian Games in Lexington, Kentucky, he won the bronze medal with the eventing team alongside Andrew Nicholson, Mark Todd, and Caroline Powell. At the 2011 CHIO Aachen in Germany, he won the silver medal in the team event alongside Nicholson, Powell, and Jonathan Paget.

Johnstone missed out on selection for the 2012 Summer Olympics; his main horse — Orient Express — was injured and he thus was not chosen. At the 2016 Summer Olympics, he finished sixth in the individual and fourth in the team event. Since 2014, his horse has been Balmoral Sensation.

He also competed for New Zealand at the 2024 Summer Olympics in the individual and team events.

== CCI 4* results ==
Johnstone achieved the following CCI 4*:

Results
Event	Kentucky	Badminton	Luhmühlen	Burghley	Pau	Adelaide
2006						13th (Oakley Vision)
2007–2008	did not participate					
2009						6th (Orient Express); EL (Oakley Vision)
2010	did not participate					
2011				17th (Incognito)		
2012–2014	did not participate					
2015						(bronze) (Balmoral Sensation)
2016		5th (Balmoral Sensation)				
2017						(gold) (Balmoral Sensation)
EL = Eliminated; RET = Retired; WD = Withdrew
