= Carlos Díaz Fernández =

Spanish equestrian (born 1983)

Personal information
- Nationality: Spanish
- Born: 20 August 1983 (age 42) Cádiz, Spain

Achievements and titles
- Olympic finals: Paris 2024

Carlos Díaz Fernández (born 20 August 1983 in Cádiz, Spain) is a Spanish eventing rider.

He competed at the 2024 Summer Olympics in Paris, France, but withdrew in the team competition. He also competed at the World Championships in 2014, 2018 and 2022 and at the European Championships in 2011, 2013, 2015 and 2017.
