= Stéphane Landois =

French equestrian (born 1994)

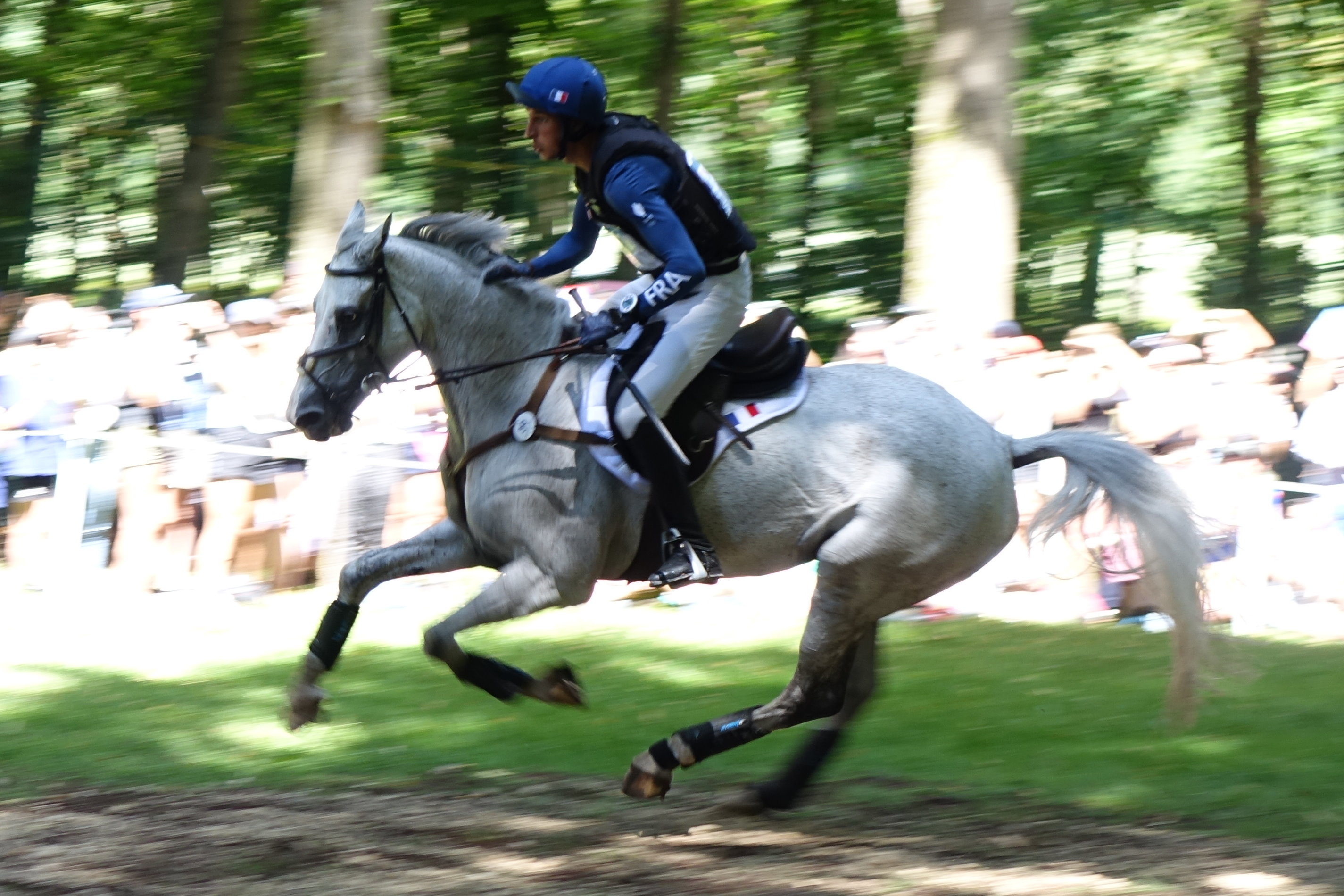
- Landois in 2024

Personal information
- Full name: Stéphane Jean-Pierre Damien Landois
- Born: 3 June 1994 (age 32) Nantes, France
Medal record
Equestrian
Representing France
Olympic Games
Silver medal – second place	2024 Paris	Team eventing
European Championships
Bronze medal – third place	2023 Haras du Pin	Team eventing

Stéphane Jean-Pierre Damien Landois (born 3 June 1994) is a French equestrian who competes in eventing.

== Early life ==
From Nantes, he has been based in Selles, Haute-Saône since 2018.

== Career ==
He was a bronze medalist on Ride For Thais Chaman Dumontceau in the team event at the 2023 European Eventing Championships, where he also placed sixth in the individual event. That year, he won the 4* Chatsworth event In Great Britain, his first individual victory in the Nations Cup, riding on Chaman. He was a silver medalist on Hermes Du Gevaudan in the six-year-old championships at the FEI WBFSH Eventing World Breeding Championships Lion D’Angers 2023.

He was selected to compete at the 2024 Paris Olympics on Chaman Dumontceau, a horse originally ridden by his friend Thais Meheust, who died following a riding accident in 2019.
