= Noor Slaoui =

Moroccan eventer

Nour Slaoui

Personal information
- Nationality: Morocco
- Discipline: Eventing
- Born: 21 January 1995 (age 31)
- Home town: Casablanca
- Horse: Cash in Hand

Noor Slaoui (Arabic: نور السلاوي, born 21 January 1995) is a Moroccan equestrian athlete.

Noor Slaoui was born on 21 January 1995. Slaoui began riding at age four, and competing at 19. She grew up in Casablanca and moved to France at the age of 18 to train at the École Nationale d'Equitation de Saumur. She graduated from the University of Warwick with a BA in politics and International relations. She and her coach Deborah Fellous run a horse farm in the Cotswolds.

In 2024, Slaoui and her stallion Cash in Hand were selected to represent Morocco at the 2024 Summer Olympics. She is the first rider to represent Morocco in Olympic eventing as well as the first person from the Middle East and North Africa to compete in Olympic eventing. The Olympics will be her first senior championship competition.
