= Manuel Grave =

Portuguese equestrian (born 1989)

Personal information
- Nationality: Portuguese
- Born: 26 September 1989 (age 36) Golegã, Portugal

Sport
- Country: Portugal
- Sport: Equestrian
- Event: Eventing

Manuel Grave (born 26 September 1989) is a Portuguese eventing competitor. He represented Portugal at the 2010 FEI World Equestrian Games in Lexington, Kentucky. As individual he has qualified for the 2024 Summer Olympics in Paris.
