= Sanna Siltakorpi =

Finnish equestrian (born 1987)

Personal information
- Born: 22 May 1987 (age 39) Parkano, Finland

Sport
- Country: Finland
- Sport: Equestrian

Achievements and titles
- Olympic finals: 2024 Olympic Games

Sanna Siltakorpi (born 22 May 1987) is a Finnish eventing rider. She competed at the 2019 and 2021 European Championships, representing Finland as individual. In 2024, she is set to compete at the 2024 Olympic Games in eventing as individual.
