= Chris Burton (equestrian) =

Australian equestrian (born 1981)

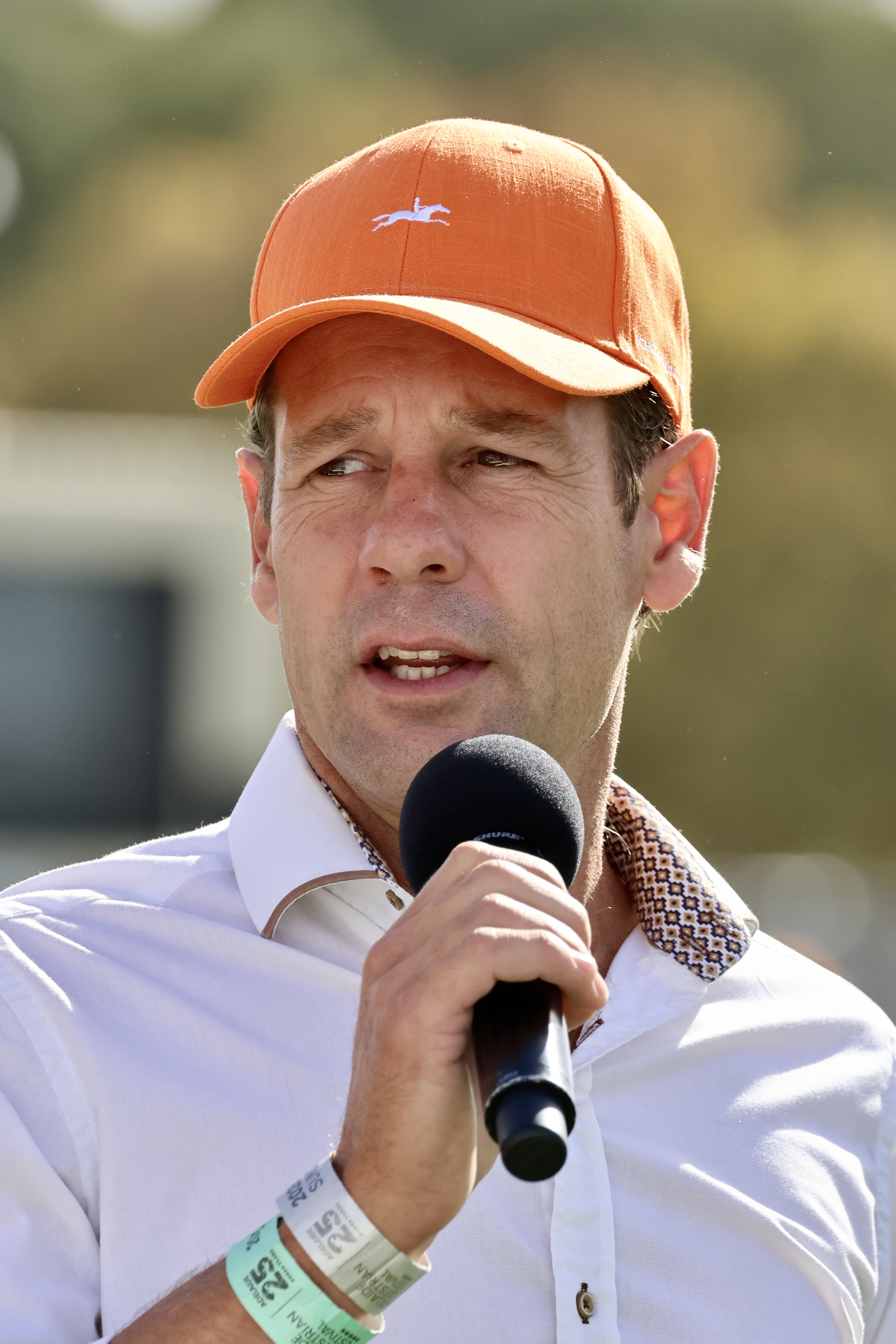
- Burton speaking at the 2025 Adelaide Equestrian Festival

Personal information
- Full name: Christopher Burton
- Nickname: Burto
- Nationality: Australian
- Born: 22 November 1981 (age 44) Toowoomba, Australia
- Height: 180 cm (5 ft 11 in) (2012)
- Weight: 70 kg (154 lb) (2012)

Sport
- Country: Australia
- Sport: Equestrian
- Event: Eventing
Medal record
Equestrian
Representing Australia
Olympic Games
Silver medal – second place	2024 Paris	Individual eventing
Bronze medal – third place	2016 Rio de Janeiro	Team eventing

Christopher "Burto" Burton (born 22 November 1981) is an Australian equestrian, and Olympic Medal winner. He was selected to represent Australia at the 2012 Summer Olympics in equestrian eventing, as well as the 2024 Summer Olympics in which he won a silver medal in the individual eventing competition.

== Personal life ==
Nicknamed Burto, Burton was born on 22 November 1981 in Toowoomba, Queensland. He spent his childhood on a grain and cattle farm at Box Ridge, Brymaroo. He attended Kulpi State School in Queensland before going to high school at Downlands College. He moved to England to improve his chances of making the 2012 Summer Olympics. As of June 2012, he lives in Dorset, England. As of 2012, Burton is 180 centimetres (71 in) tall and weighs 70 kilograms (150 lb).

== Equestrian ==
Burton is an equestrian eventing competitor. He is coached by Brett Parbery. He has also been coached by Prue Barratt since 2010. His primary training base is Dorset, United Kingdom with a secondary base in Wilberforce, Australia. He was a member of Brymaroo Pony Club. His first Australian national team appearance was in 2010 at the Equestrian Games in Kentucky.

Burton finished 2nd at the 2011 FEI World Cup overall. He finished 8th at the 2011 Les Etoiles de Pau CCI4 held in Pau, France. He finished 5th at the 2011 Gatcombe British Open Championships held in Gatcombe, Great Britain. He finished 2nd and 3rd at the 2011 Le Pin au Haras Pin CIC3 held in Le Pin, France. He finished 2nd at the 2011 Sydney CIC3 held in Sydney, Australia. He finished 2nd at the 2011 Kihikihi CIC held in Kihikihi, New Zealand. He finished 2nd at the 2012 Saumur CCI3 held in Saumur, France.

Burton was selected to represent Australia at the 2012 Summer Olympics in equestrian eventing. The 2012 Games were his debut Games, after having attempted and failing to make the Games two times before. Riding Holstein Park Leilani, he placed 6th in team eventing and 16th individually.

Burton started the 2013 season with 10th-place finish at Badminton Horse Trials. Later that year he won the CICO3* in Aachen and won the Australian International Three Day Event riding TS Jamaimo. Following year he got selected to represent Australia at the 2014 World Equestrian Games in Normandy, France, but had to withdraw during the competition. In 2015 he placed 4th at the Luhmühlen Horse Trials and 3rd at the Burghley Horse Trials.

He got selected to represent Australia at the 2016 Summer Olympics where he won a team bronze and placed 5th individually. Burton was on the top of the individual leader board after the cross-country stage, but several mistakes in the jumping stage cost him the individual medal.

Few weeks after the Olympics Burton won the Burghley Horse Trials with the horse Nobilis. He became the first Australian winner at Burghley 4* since 2006.

Burton won a Silver Medal in the Equestrian Individual Eventing at the 2024 Summer Olympics riding Shadowman.

== CCI5* results ==
Results
Event	Kentucky	Badminton	Luhmühlen	Burghley	Pau	Adelaide
2003						17th (Deo Juvante)
2004	Did not participate					
2005						14th (Leedo); 18th (Deo Juvante)
2006						4th (Balmoral KS Roscoe)
2007	Did not participate					
2008						(gold) (Newsprint)
2009						EL (Holstein Park Leilani)
2010						(silver) (Newsprint)
2011				EL (Holstein Park Leilani)	8th (Holstein Park Leilani); WD (Newsprint)	
2012					RET (Underdiscussion)	
2013		10th (Holstein Park Leilani)			22nd (Tempranillo)	(gold) (TS Jamaimo)
2014		16th (TS Jamaimo)	EL (Tempranillo)			
2015		27th (TS Jamaimo)	4th (Graf Liberty)	(bronze) (TS Jamaimo); 4th (Haruzac)		
2016		EL (Nobilis)		(gold) (Nobilis)	11th (TS Jamaimo)	
2017		18th (Graf Liberty)				
2018	9th (Nobilis)					
2019		(bronze) (Cooley Lands); 4th (Graf Liberty)			(silver) (Quality Purdey)	
EL = Eliminated; RET = Retired; WD = Withdrew

== International Championship results ==
Results
Year	Event	Horse	Placing	Notes
2010	World Equestrian Games	Holstein Park Leilani	48th	Individual
2012	Olympic Games	Holstein Park Leilani	6th	Team
2012	Olympic Games	Holstein Park Leilani	16th	Individual
2014	World Young Horse Championships	Dutch Man Retto	2nd place, silver medalist(s)	CCI*
2014	World Equestrian Games	TS Jamaimo	4th	Team
2014	World Equestrian Games	TS Jamaimo	WD	Individual
2014	World Young Horse Championships	Limited Edition	20th	CCI*
2014	World Young Horse Championships	Cooley Lands	4th	CCI**
2016	World Young Horse Championships	Fire Fly	1st place, gold medalist(s)	CCI*
2016	Olympic Games	Santano II	3rd place, bronze medalist(s)	Team
2016	Olympic Games	Santano II	5th	Individual
2017	World Young Horse Championships	Lawtown Boy	11th	CCI**
2018	World Equestrian Games	Cooley Lands	6th	Team
2018	World Equestrian Games	Cooley Lands	36th	Individual
2019	World Young Horse Championships	Coup de Coeur Dudevin	7th	CCI***
EL = Eliminated; RET = Retired; WD = Withdrew

== Notable Horses ==
- Newsprint – 1995 Bay Thoroughbred Gelding (Rubiton)
  - 2008 Adelaide CCI**** Winner
- Holstein Park Leilani – 1996 Chestnut Mare (Lander)
  - 2010 World Equestrian Games – Individual 48th Place
  - 2012 London Olympics – Team Sixth Place, Individual 16th Place
- TS Jamaimo – 1999 Bay Thoroughbred Gelding (Urgent Request x Bustino)
  - 2013 Adelaide CCI**** Winner
  - 2014 World Equestrian Games – Team Fourth Place
- Nobilis 18 – 2005 Bay Hanoverian Gelding (Nobre XX x Lemon XX)
  - 2016 Burghley CCI**** Winner
- Fire Fly – 2010 Bay Dutch Warmblood Stallion (Zavall VDL x Corland)
  - 2016 FEI Eventing Young Horse World Championships – Gold Medal
- Santano II – 2007 Black Hanoverian Gelding (Sandro Hit x Brentano II)
  - 2016 Rio Olympics – Team Bronze Medal, Individual Fifth Place
- Lawtown Boy – 2010 Dark Brown Holsteiner Stallion (Larimar x Anthonysdream)
  - 2017 FEI Eventing Young Horse Championships – 11th Place
