= Veera Manninen =

Finnish equestrian (born 2000)

Personal information
- Born: 29 January 2000 (age 26) Pieksämäki, Finland

Sport
- Country: Finland
- Sport: Equestrian
- Event: Eventing

Achievements and titles
- Olympic finals: 2024 Olympic Games

Veera Manninen (born 29 January 2000) is a Finnish eventing rider. She competed at the 2018, 2019 and 2019 European Youth Championships. In 2024, she is set to compete at the 2024 Olympic Games in eventing as individual.
