= Tine Magnus =

Belgian equestrian (born 1991)

Personal information
- Born: 25 August 1991 (age 35) Merchtem, Belgium

Sport
- Country: Belgium
- Sport: Equestrian
- Event: Eventing

Achievements and titles
- Olympic finals: Paris 2024

Tine Magnus (born 25 August 1991 in Merchtem) is a Belgian equestrian.

She represented the Belgium at the 2024 Summer Olympics and competed in team Eventing on her horse Dia Van Het Lichterveld Z.

Shortly after the completion of the games, the team was provisionally suspended for an anti-doping violation relating to a positive test for trazodone on Tine Magnus's horse Dia Van Het Lichterveld Z. In February 2025, the FEI disqualified the team's results following a determination of "no significant fault or negligence" as the source of the banned substance was a contaminated supplement administered by the team vet. Magnus was issued a five-month suspension (backdated to September) and fined CHF 4,000 with the horse suspended for two months (backdated to September).
