= Lara de Liedekerke-Meier =

Belgian equestrian

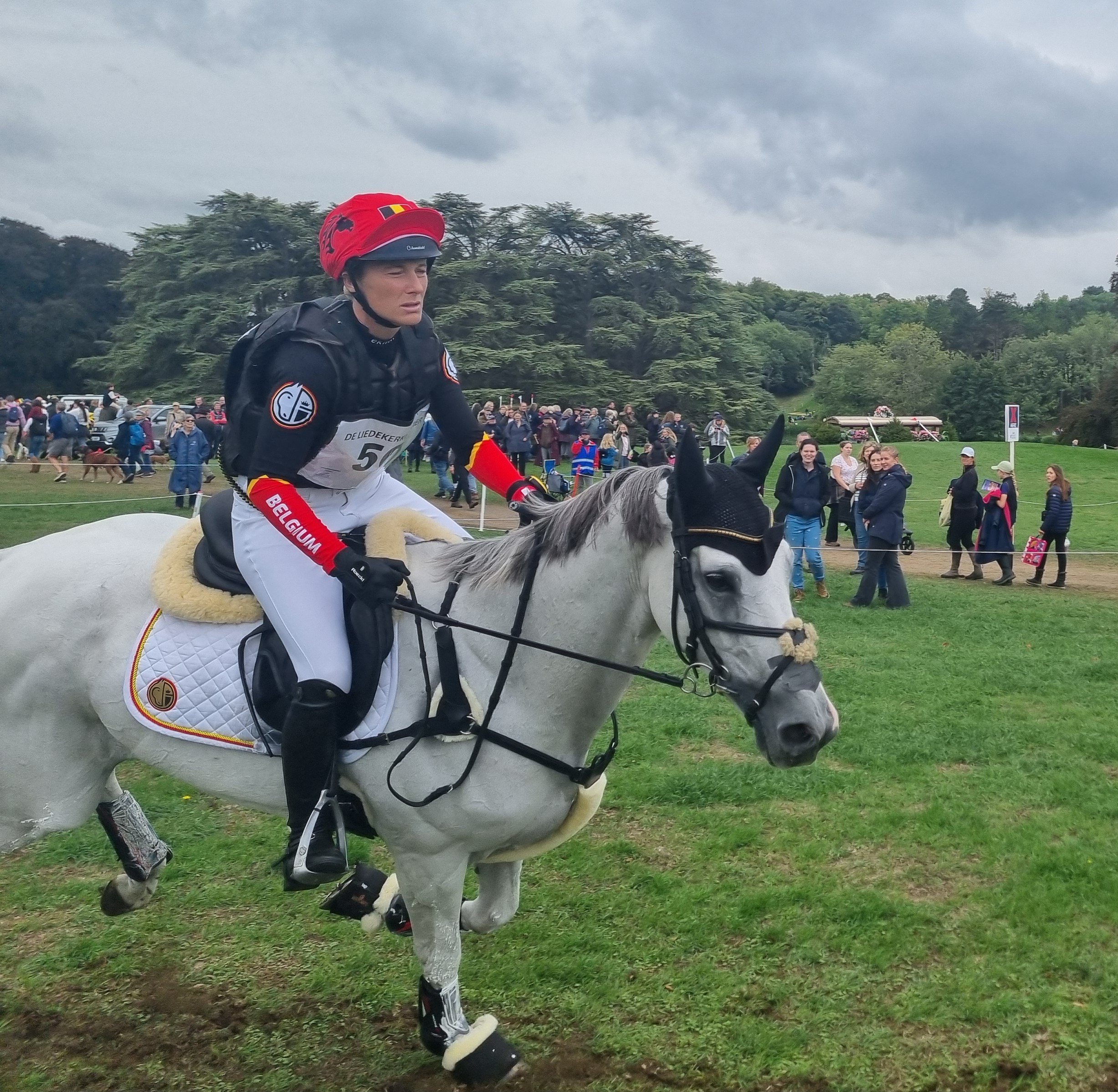
- 2025 European Eventing Championships

Personal information
- Full name: Lara de Liedekerke de Pailhe
- Discipline: Eventing
- Born: 6 February 1988 (age 38); Uccle, Belgium

Countess Lara de Liedekerke-Meier, née de Liedekerke de Pailhe, (born 6 February 1988) is a Belgian equestrian. She competed in the individual eventing at the 2020 Summer Olympics. At the 2024 Summer Olympics, she partook in the team eventing, where Belgium placed 4th, and the Individual eventing (13th).
