= Balázs Kaizinger =

Hungarian equestrian (born 1979)

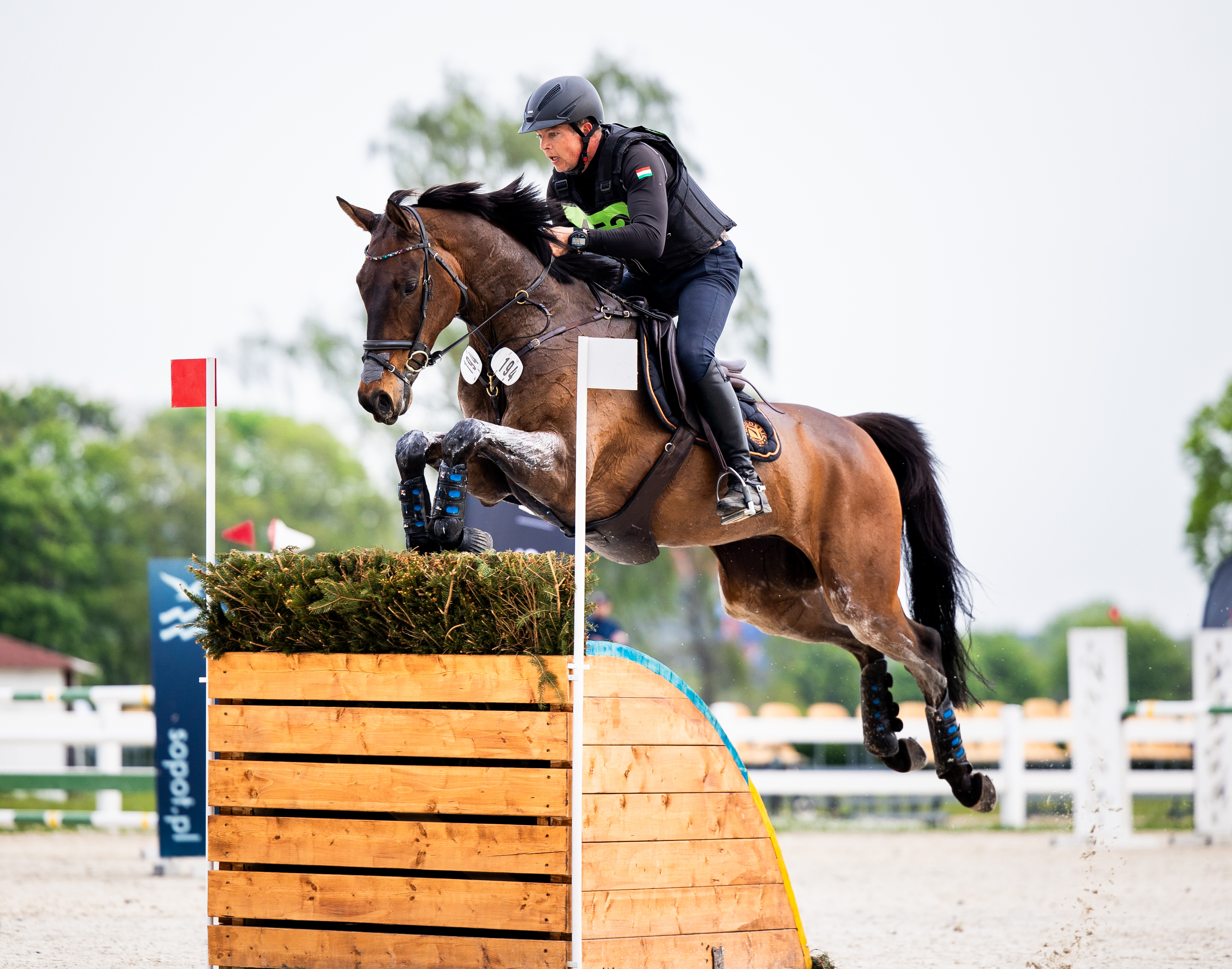
- Kaizinger in 2024

Personal information
- Born: 13 June 1979 (age 47) Zalaegerszeg, Hungary

Sport
- Country: Hungary
- Sport: Equestrian
- Event: Eventing

Achievements and titles
- Olympic finals: 2024 Olympic Games

Balázs Kaizinger (born 13 June 1979 in Zalaegerszeg, Hungary) is an Olympic Hungarian eventing rider. He competed at the 2022 World Championships in Italy.

In 2024 he competed at the 2024 Summer Olympics in Paris.
