= Raf Kooremans =

Dutch equestrian (born 1977)

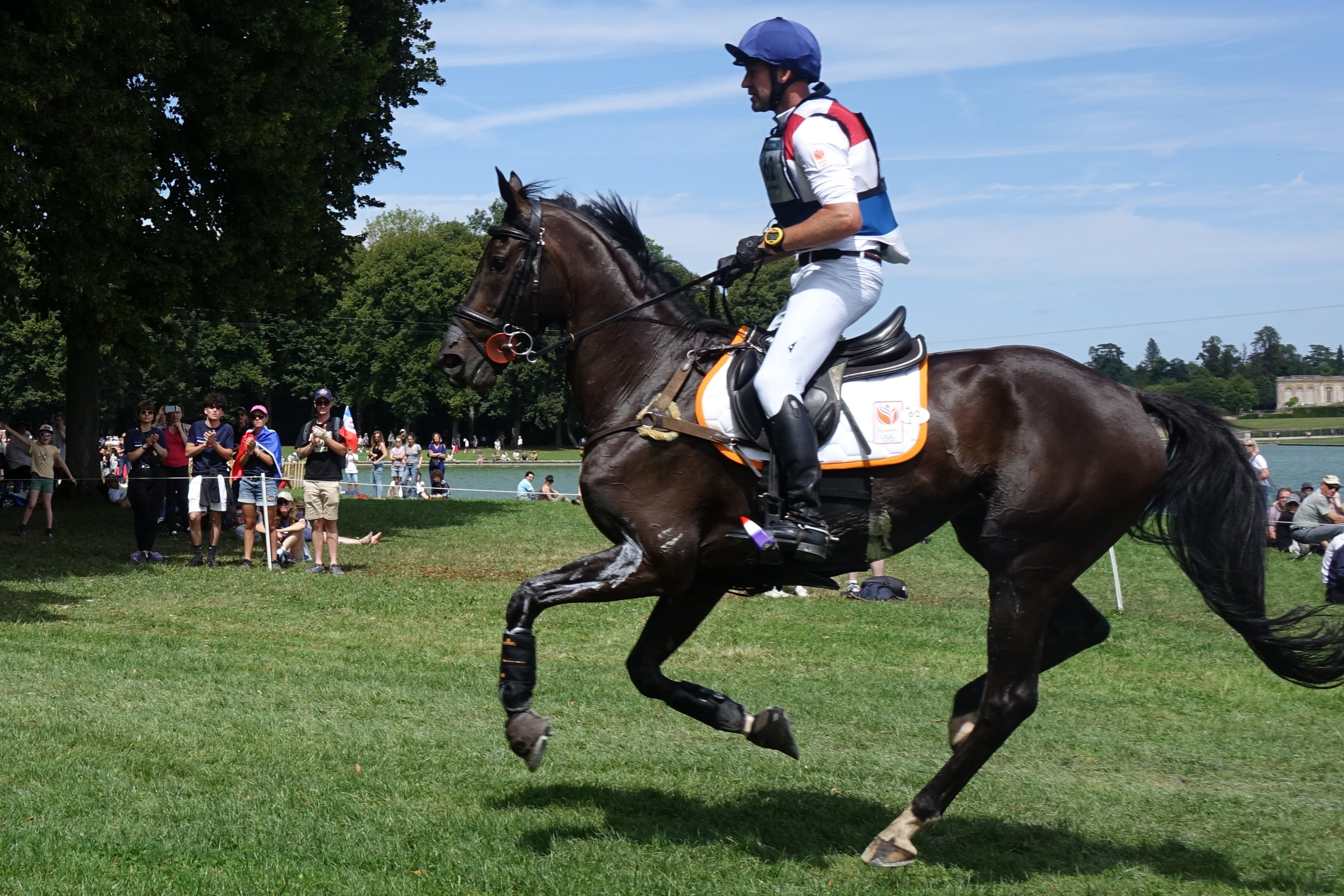
- Kooremans at the 2024 Olympics

Personal information
- Nationality: Dutch, Belgian
- Born: 8 March 1977 (age 48) Turnhout, Belgium

Sport
- Sport: Equestrian
- Event: Eventing

Raf Kooremans (born 8 March 1977, Turnhout, Belgium) is a Belgian born Dutch equestrian. He represented the Netherlands at the 2018 World Equestrian Games in Tryon and at the European Championships in 2005, 2009 and 2011. Kooremans competes for The Netherlands since 2009, he is half Dutch and half Belgian.

He has been nominated to represent The Netherlands at the 2024 Olympic Games in Paris.
