= Louise Romeike =

Swedish equestrian

Personal information
- Full name: Louise Emilie Kristin Romeike
- Born: 8 October 1990 (age 36) Kävlinge, Sweden

Sport
- Sport: Equestrian
- Event: Eventing
Medal record
Equestrian
Representing Sweden
European Championships
Silver medal – second place	2017 Strzegom	Team eventing

Louise Emilie Kristin Romeike (born 8 October 1990) is a Swedish equestrian. She represented Sweden at the 2020 Summer Olympics and competed in Individual and Team Eventing on her horse Cato. She was eliminated from the competition during the cross country phase.

Romeike lives in Meyn, Germany with her husband, Claas Romeike, who owns her Olympic horse, Cato.
