= Giovanni Ugolotti =

Italian equestrian (born 1982)

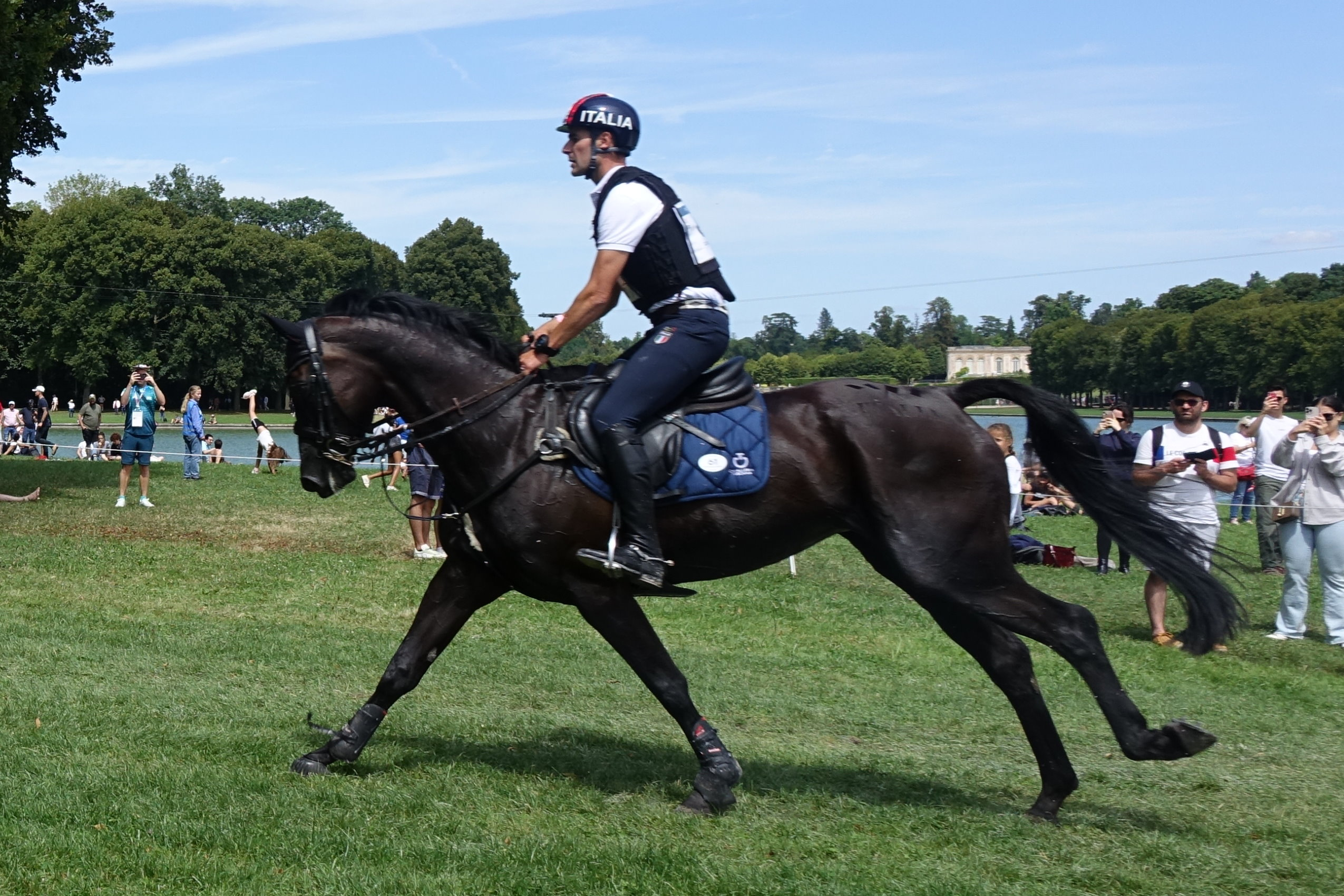
- Ugolotti at the 2024 Olympics

Personal information
- Nickname: Jo
- Born: 1 October 1982 (age 43) Parma, Italy
- Height: 1.86 m (6 ft 1 in)
- Weight: 80 kg (176 lb)

Sport
- Country: Italy
- Sport: Equestrian
- Event: Eventing
- Club: Esercito
- Coached by: Katherine Lucheschi

Achievements and titles
- Olympic finals: 2024 Olympic Games

Giovanni Ugolotti (born 1 October 1982 in Parma, Italy) is an Olympic Italian eventing rider. He competed at the 2023 European Championships and at the 2014 and 2022 World Championships.

In 2024 he competed at the 2024 Summer Olympics in Paris.
