= Robin Godel =

Swiss equestrian

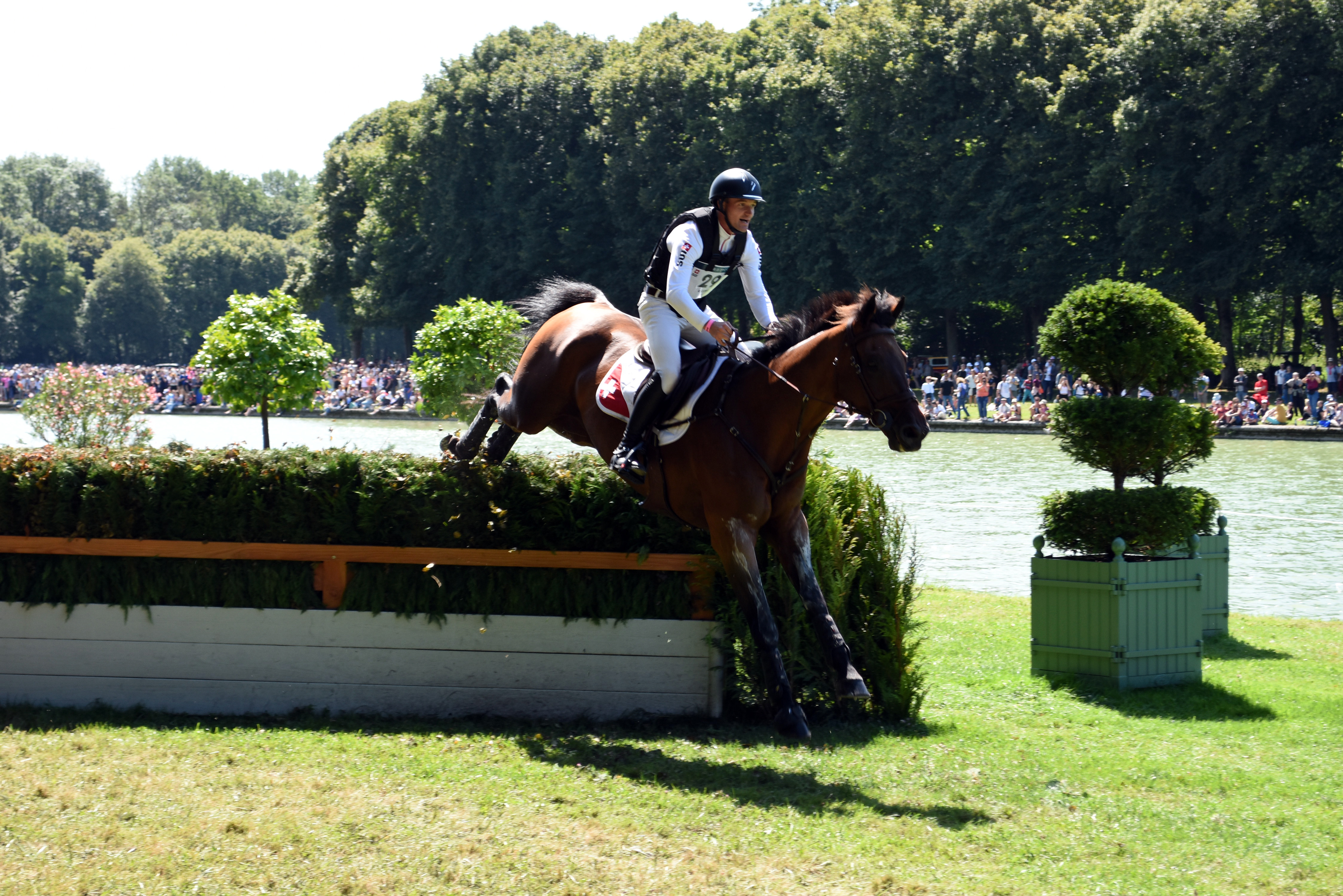
- Godel at the 2024 Olympics

Personal information
- Discipline: Eventing
- Born: 18 August 1998 (age 27); Fribourg, Switzerland

Robin Godel (born 18 August 1998) is a Swiss equestrian. Godel competed in the individual eventing at the 2020 Summer Olympics, during which his horse Jet Set was injured, and eventually euthanized.
