= Evelina Bertoli =

Italian equestrian (born 1986)

Personal information
- Born: 8 July 1986 (age 40) Rome, Italy
- Height: 1.65 m (5 ft 5 in)
- Weight: 62 kg (137 lb)

Sport
- Country: Italy
- Sport: Equestrian
- Event: Eventing
- Club: Fiamme Azzurre
- Coached by: Katherine Lucheschi

Achievements and titles
- Olympic finals: 2024 Olympic Games

Evelina Bertoli (born 8 July 1986 in Rome, Italy) is an Olympic Italian eventing rider. Bertoli placed second in the 2020 FEI Eventing Nations Cup in Montelibretti, Italy—the Italian Grand Championships. She competed at the 2021 and 2023 European Championships, and the 2022 World Championships in Pratoni del Vivaro. In 2024 she competed at the 2024 Summer Olympics in Paris and finished 22nd in the individual standings. Previously a modern pentathlete, she was Italian junior champion in modern pentathlon in 2004 and 2005.

Bertoli is a member of Fiamme Azzurre, the sports group of the Italian prison police and wears their insignia when she rides. Her older sister Sara Bertoli was also a member of Fiamme Azzurre and took part in the 2008 Olympic Games in modern pentathlon, and was an alternate in 2004.
