= Robert Powała =

Polish equestrian

Personal information
- Born: 12 October 1971 (age 54) Trzebiatów, Poland

Sport
- Country: Poland
- Sport: Equestrian
- Event: Eventing

Robert Powała (born 12 October 1971 in Trzebiatów, Poland) is a Polish equestrian. Powała competed in several international competitions and represented his country at several major championships including the World Breeding Championships in 2019 and 2016 and the FEI World Cup Finals in 2008 and 2009. He lives in Italy for many years, where he also runs his equestrian business.

Powała represented the Polish eventing team at the 2024 Summer Olympics in Paris.
