= Sanne de Jong =

Dutch equestrian (born 1994)

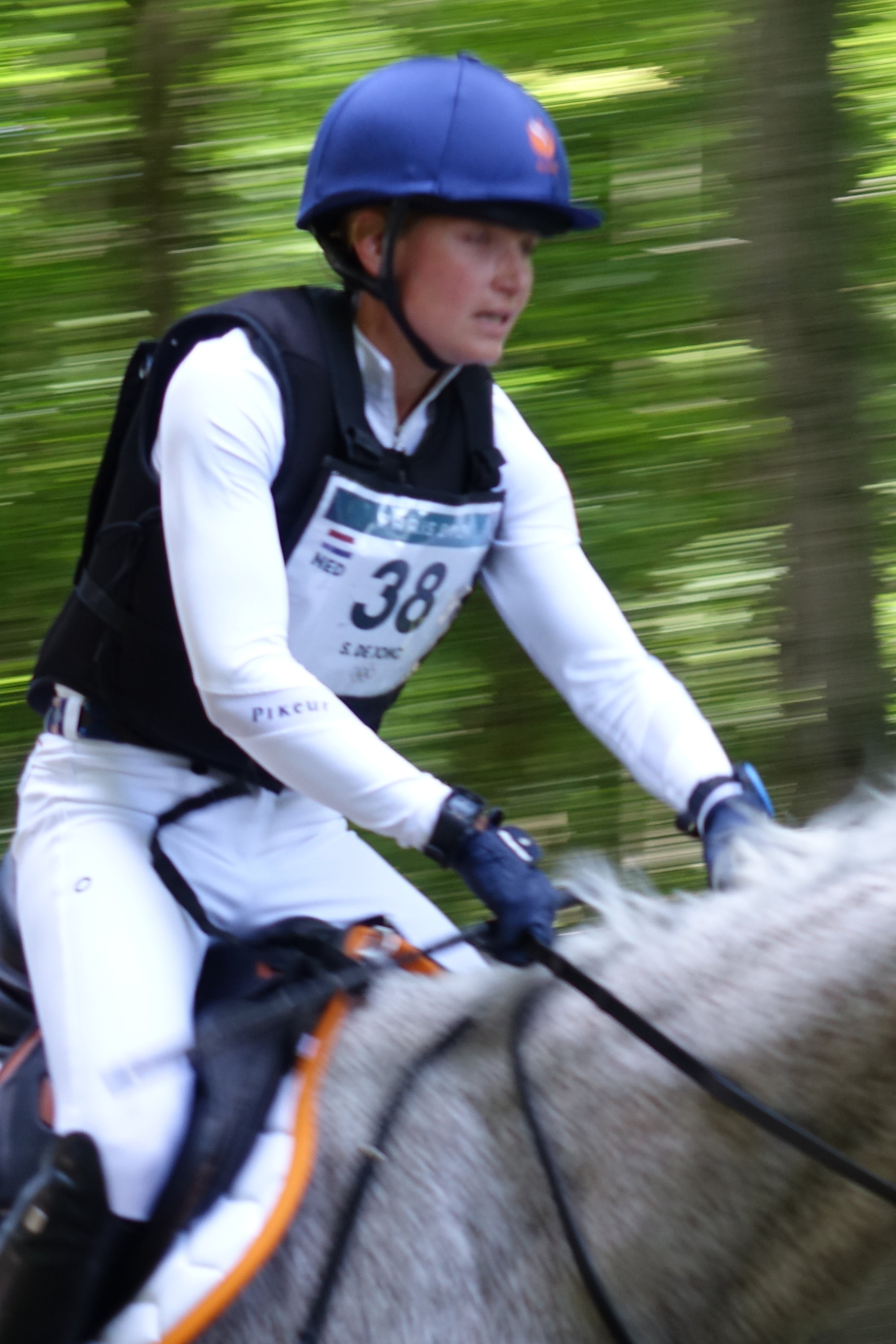

Personal information
- Nationality: Dutch
- Born: 17 December 1994 (age 31) Aalsmeer, Netherlands

Sport
- Sport: Equestrian
- Event: Eventing

Sanne de Jong (born 17 December 1994, Aalsmeer, Netherlands is a Dutch equestrian. She represented the Netherlands at the 2022 World Championships in Italy and at the 2021 and 2023 European Championships.

She represented The Netherlands at the 2024 Olympic Games in Paris.
