= Christoph Wahler =

German eventing rider

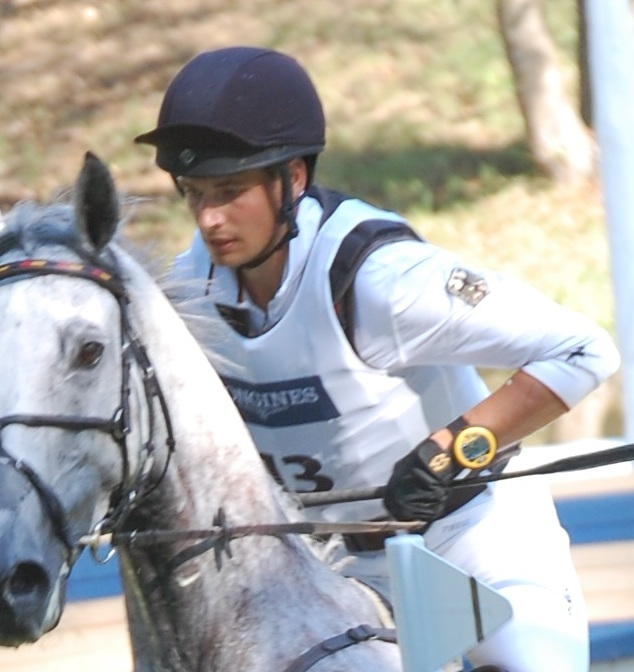
- Christoph Wahler in 2019

Personal information
- Nationality: German
- Born: 21 January 1994 (age 32) Uelzen, Germany
- Education: German Military School of Sport at Warendorf, Agricultural Studies at University of Osnabrueck
- Occupation(s): Manager of the family business, Klosterhof Medingen stud

Sport
- Country: Germany
- Sport: Equestrian
- Coached by: Anne-Kathrin Pohlmeier (GER) - dressage

Achievements and titles
- Olympic finals: 2024 Summer Olympics

Christoph Wahler (born 21 January 1994 in Uelzen, Germany) is a German eventing rider.

== Career ==
He competed at the 2022 World Championships in Proton del Vivaro, where he won a Gold team medal with the German team. Wahler competed at the 2021 and 2023 European Championships, and earned silver medals at the European Championships in 2014 and 2015.

Wahler is a third generation horseman. He the son of event rider, Burkhard Wahler, who was the German national champion in 1984. His grandfather Eugen Wahler founded a horse breeding facility at Klosterhof Medingen in the 1960s, which Wahler runs today.

=== 2024 Olympics ===
In 2024, he was selected to compete for Germany at the Summer Olympic Games in Paris. After posting 29.4 penalties in dressage, Wahler was eliminated in cross-country when he fell from his mount Carjatan S. Before Wahler's fall, Germany was the second placed team in the competition. Whaler and Carjantan S. were allowed to compete in the showjumping phase, where they posted a clear round.
