= Karl Slezak =

Canadian equestrian

Personal information
- Born: December 14, 1981 (age 44) Toronto, Ontario, Canada

Sport
- Sport: Equestrian eventing
Medal record
Equestrian eventing
Representing Canada
Pan American Games
Gold medal – first place	2023 Santiago	Team eventing
Bronze medal – third place	2019 Lima	Team eventing

Karl Slezak (born December 14, 1981) is a Canadian equestrian competing in the eventing disicipline.

== Career ==
Slezak has represented Canada at two Pan American Games. Slezak first represented Canada at the 2019 Pan American Games in Lima, Peru. Slezak was part of the team that won the bronze medal in the team event. Four years later at the 2023 Pan American Games, Slezak would win the gold medal as part of the team event. Slezak would also finish fourth individually.

In July 2024, Slezak qualified to compete for Canada at the 2024 Summer Olympics.
