= Sofia Sjöborg =

Swedish equestrian

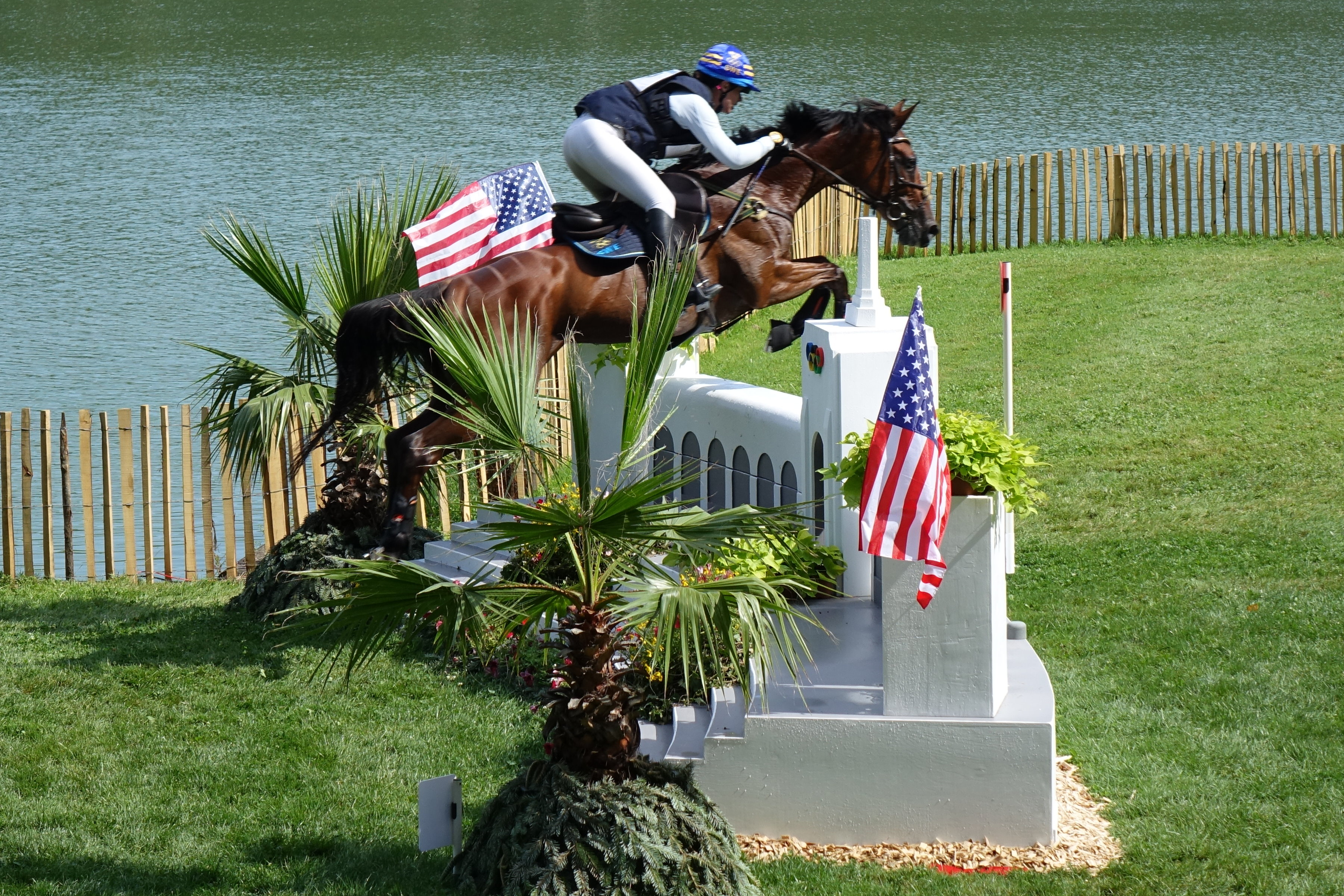
- Sjöborg at the 2024 Summer Olympics

Personal information
- Full name: Sofia Bozena Elisabett Sjöborg
- Nationality: Swedish
- Born: 7 May 1998 (age 28) Westminster, London, England
- Education: University of Bath

Sport
- Country: Sweden
- Sport: Equestrian
- Event: Eventing

Sofia Bozena Elisabett Sjöborg (born 7 May 1998) is a Swedish eventing rider. Born and raised in England, Sjöborg represented Sweden at the 2021 and 2023 European Championships and at the 2022 World Championships. She has been nominated to represent the Swedish eventing team at the 2024 Summer Olympics in Paris.

As a teenager, Sjöborg wrote to Michael Jung asking if she could train with him as a young rider. He accepted, and she moved to Germany to train with Jung from 2016 to 2019. In 2023, she placed second with Eastbourn at the Agria Top 10 Indoor Eventing competition, held at the Sweden International Horse Show.

== Personal life ==
Sjöborg was born in England and grew up between South Kensington, London and Shipton Moyne in the Cotswolds. Her father is Swedish and her mother is American. While not competing with the Swedish national team, Sjöborg studies engineering at the University of Bath.
