= Jan Kamiński =

Polish equestrian

Personal information
- Full name: Janek Kamiński
- Nationality: Polish
- Born: 18 September 1992 (age 33)
- Home town: Milanówek, Poland
- Height: 1.85 m (6 ft 1 in)
- Spouse: Małgorzata Korycka

Sport
- Country: Poland
- Sport: Equestrian
- Event: Eventing

Jan Kamiński (born 18 September 1992) is a Polish equestrian. He competed in the 2020 Summer Olympics and the 2024 Summer Olympics.
