= Susie Berry =

Irish equestrian

Susannah Berry
Personal information
- Nickname: Susie
- Nationality: Irish
- Born: 22 April 1985 (age 41) County Down, Northern Ireland

Sport
- Country: Ireland
- Sport: Equestrian
- Event: Eventing

Susannah 'Susie' Berry (born 1 January 1996 in County Down, Northern Ireland) is an Irish eventing rider. She competed at the 2022 World Championships Eventing in Italy representing the Irish team with her horse By Design. In 2023 she competed at the 2023 European Eventing Championships. From 2012 to 2017 she represented Ireland at various youth European Championships in the Ponies, Juniors and Young Riders division.

In April 2024, Berry was received a warning for "Abuse of Horse—Minor case of blood on the Horse” at the Defender Kentucky Horse Trials.

The Irish equestrian federation has selected Berry to represent the Irish eventing team at the 2024 Summer Olympics in Paris.
