= Mélody Johner =

Swiss equestrian (born 1984)

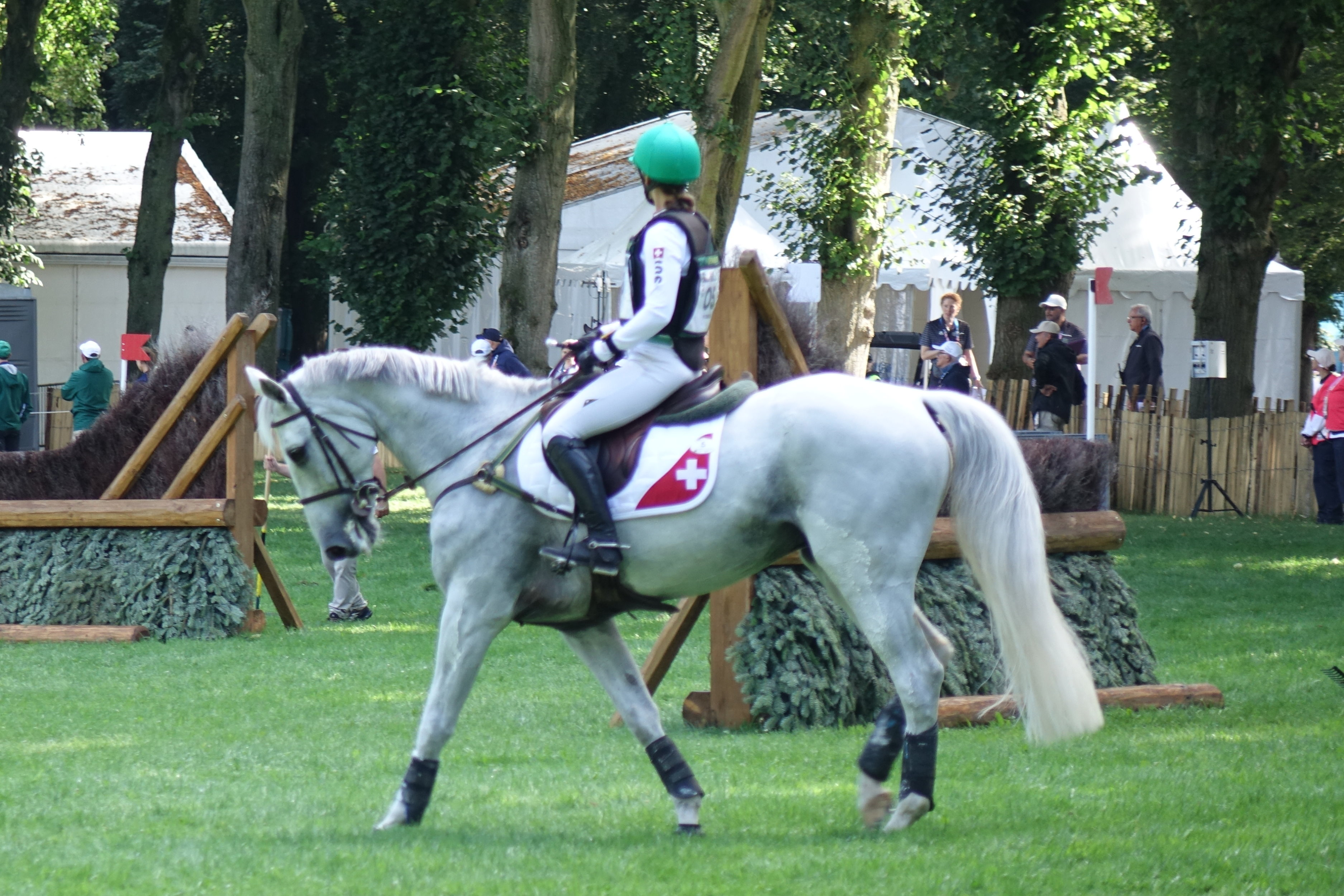
- Johner at the 2024 Olympics

Personal information
- Born: 7 March 1984 (age 42) Monthey, Valais, Switzerland

Sport
- Country: Switzerland
- Sport: Equestrian
- Event: Eventing

Mélody Johner (born 7 March 1984) is a Swiss equestrian. She represented Switzerland at the 2020 Summer Olympics and competed in Individual and Team Eventing on her horse Toubleu de Rueire. She finished 17th in the Individual competition and the Swiss team finished tenth. She also competed at the 2024 Summer Olympics in Paris.
