= Frida Andersén =

Swedish equestrian

Personal information
- Discipline: Eventing
- Born: 9 June 1990 (age 36); Hofors, Sweden
- Height: 164 cm (5 ft 5 in)
Medal record
Equestrian
Representing Sweden
European Championships
Silver medal – second place	2013 Malmö	Team eventing

Frida Andersén (born 9 June 1990) is a Swedish Olympic eventing rider. She competed at the 2016 Summer Olympics in Rio de Janeiro, but had to withdraw during the individual competition after the cross-country phase.

Andersen also participated at the 2013 European Eventing Championships, where she won a team silver medal and placed 9th individually.
