= Janneke Boonzaaijer =

Swiss equestrian (born 1996)

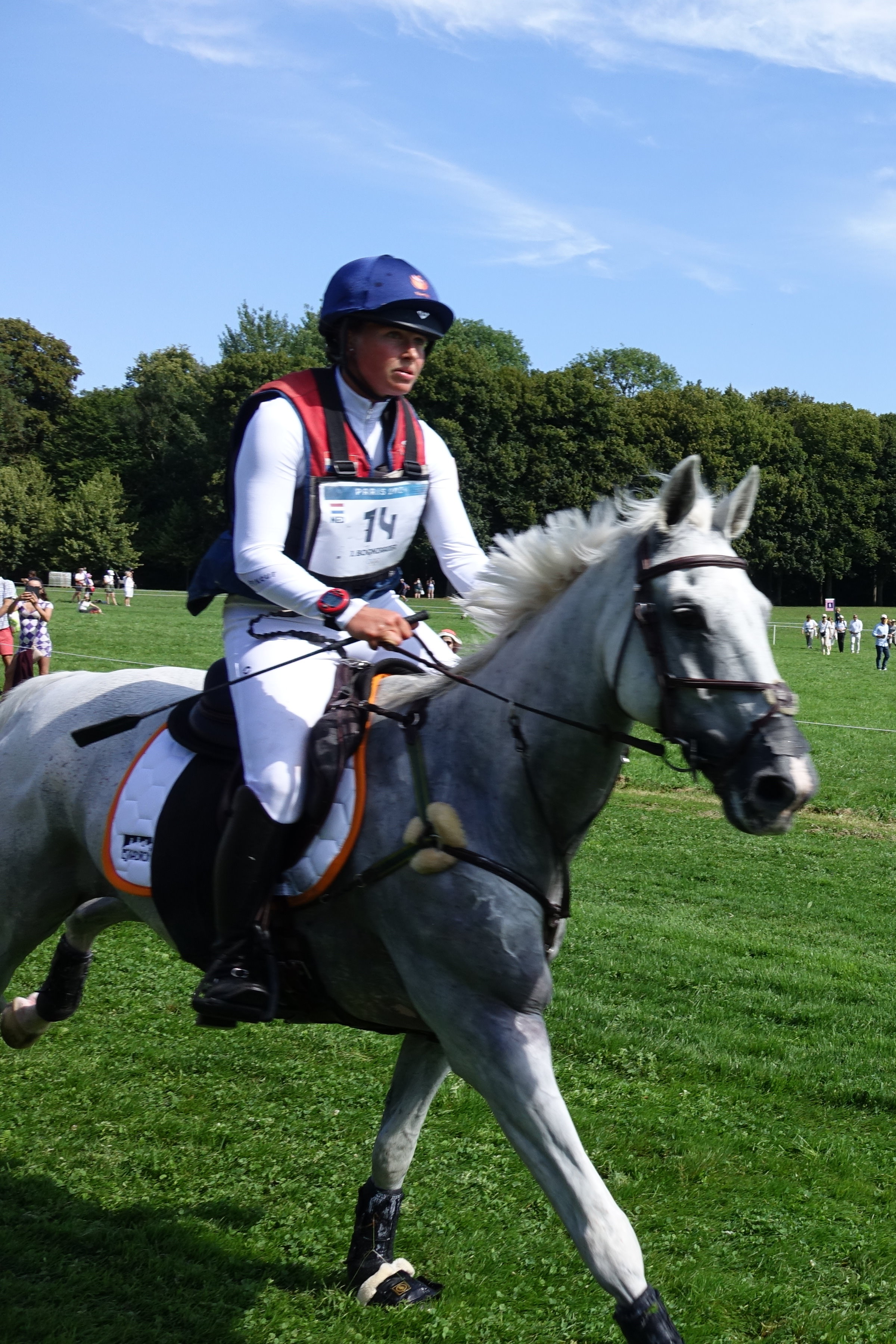
- Boonzaaijer at the 2024 Olympic Games

Personal information
- Nationality: Dutch
- Born: 6 September 1996 (age 30) Ede, Netherlands

Sport
- Country: Netherlands
- Sport: Equestrian
- Event: Eventing

Janneke Boonzaaijer (born 6 September 1996 in Ede, Netherlands) is a Dutch equestrian. She represented the Netherlands at the 2020 Summer Olympics and competed in Individual Eventing on her horse Champ de Tailleur.

At Strzegom in June 2023, Boonzaaijer came third in the individual event and was a member of the Dutch team which won the FEI Eventing Nations Cup event. In 2024 she represented The Netherlands for the second time at the 2024 Olympic Games in Paris on the same horse. She went on to win the Indoor Cross Country at CHI de Geneve in 2025.
