= Emiliano Portale =

Italian equestrian (born 1984)

Personal information
- Born: 9 July 1984 (age 42) Rome, Italy

Sport
- Country: Italy
- Sport: Equestrian
- Event: Eventing
- Club: Military Riding Centre, Montelibretti
- Coached by: Katherine Ferguson Lucheschi

Achievements and titles
- Olympic finals: 2024 Olympic Games

Emiliano Portale (born 9 July 1984) is an Olympic Italian eventing rider. He competed at the 2021 and 2023 European Championships, and became national champion in Italy several times, including in 2021.

In 2024, he was selected to compete for Italy at the 2024 Summer Olympics in Paris. After his dressage test, blood was found in his horse's mouth and he was eliminated from the competition.
