= Małgorzata Korycka =

Polish equestrian (born 1992)

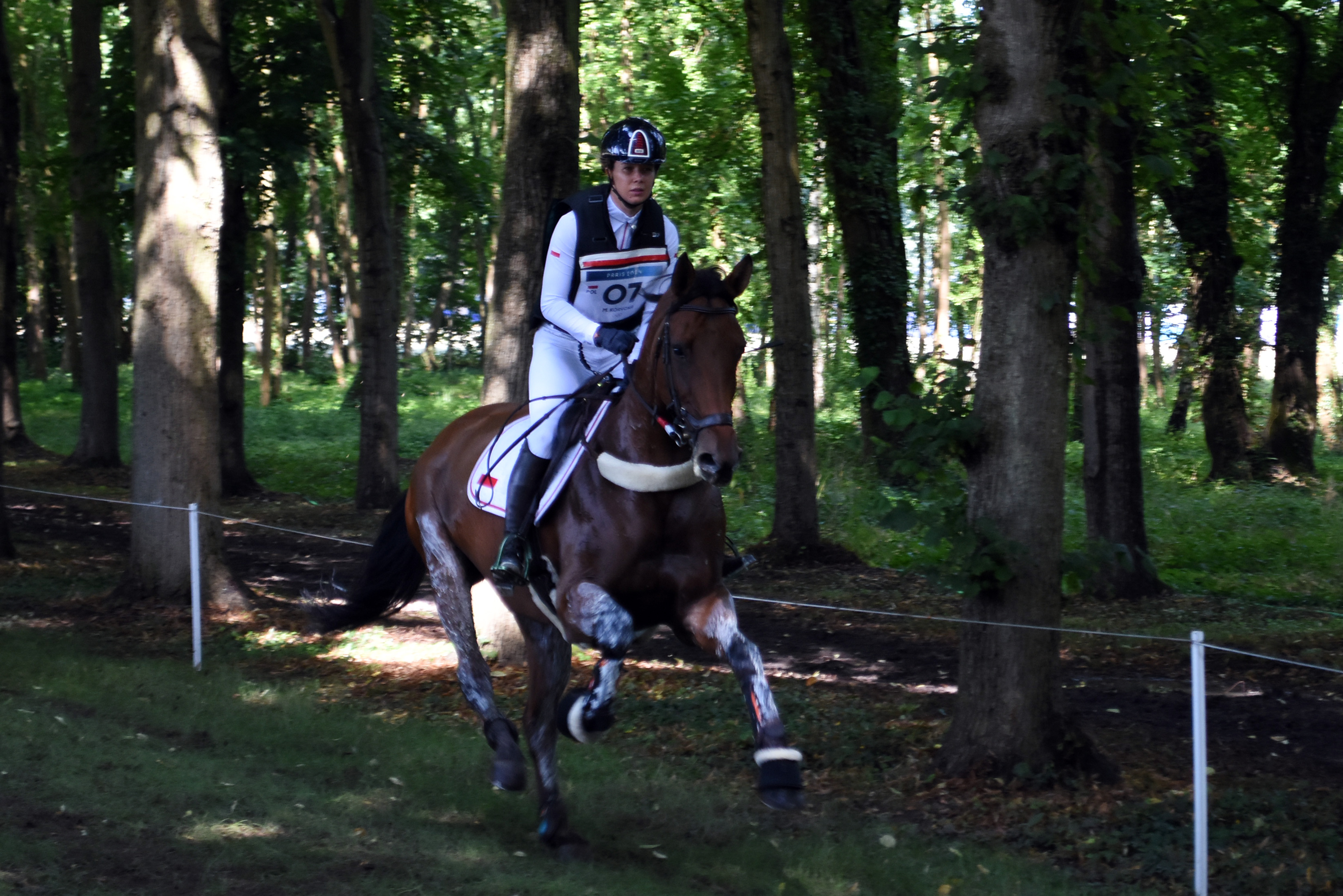
- Korycka at the 2024 Summer Olympics

Personal information
- Full name: Małgorzata Korycka-Kamińska
- Nickname: Gosia
- Born: 20 August 1992 (age 34) Warsaw, Poland
- Spouse: Jan Kamiński

Sport
- Country: Poland
- Sport: Equestrian
- Event: Eventing

Małgorzata 'Gosia' Korycka (born 20 August 1992 in Warsaw, Poland) is a Polish equestrian. She competed at the 2022 World Eventing Championships in Pratoni del Vivaro, Italy, as well as the 2021 European Championships in Avenches, Switzerland. Korycka has been selected by the Polish Equestrian Federation to represent the Polish eventing team at the 2024 Summer Olympics in Paris.
