= 2025 European Eventing Championships =

Equestrian event in Oxfordshire, England, UK

- Venue: Blenheim Palace
- Location: Woodstock, Oxfordshire, England
- Dates: 18–21 September
- Competitors: 56 from 17 nations
- Website: www.bpiht.co.uk

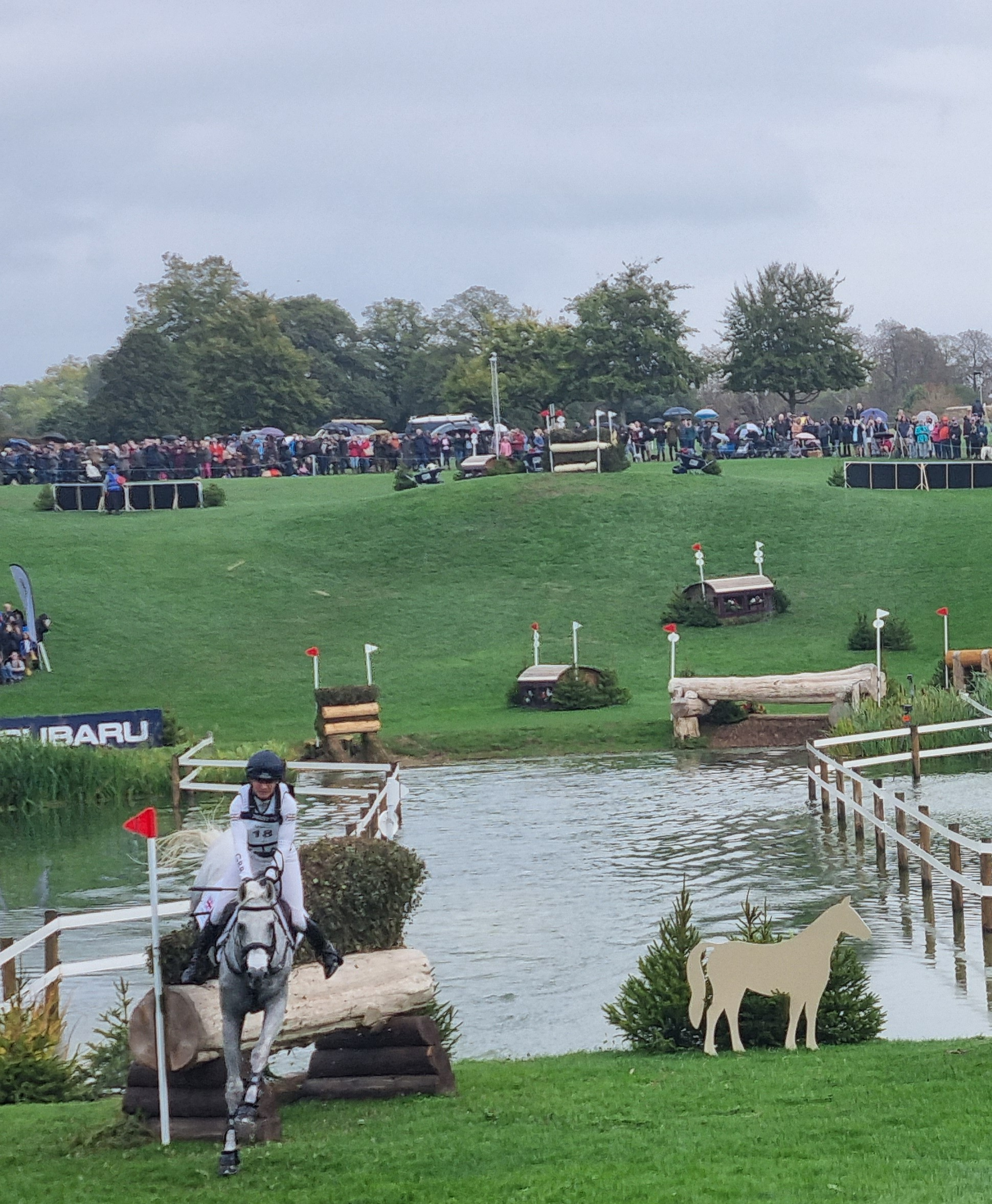
Cross-country competition

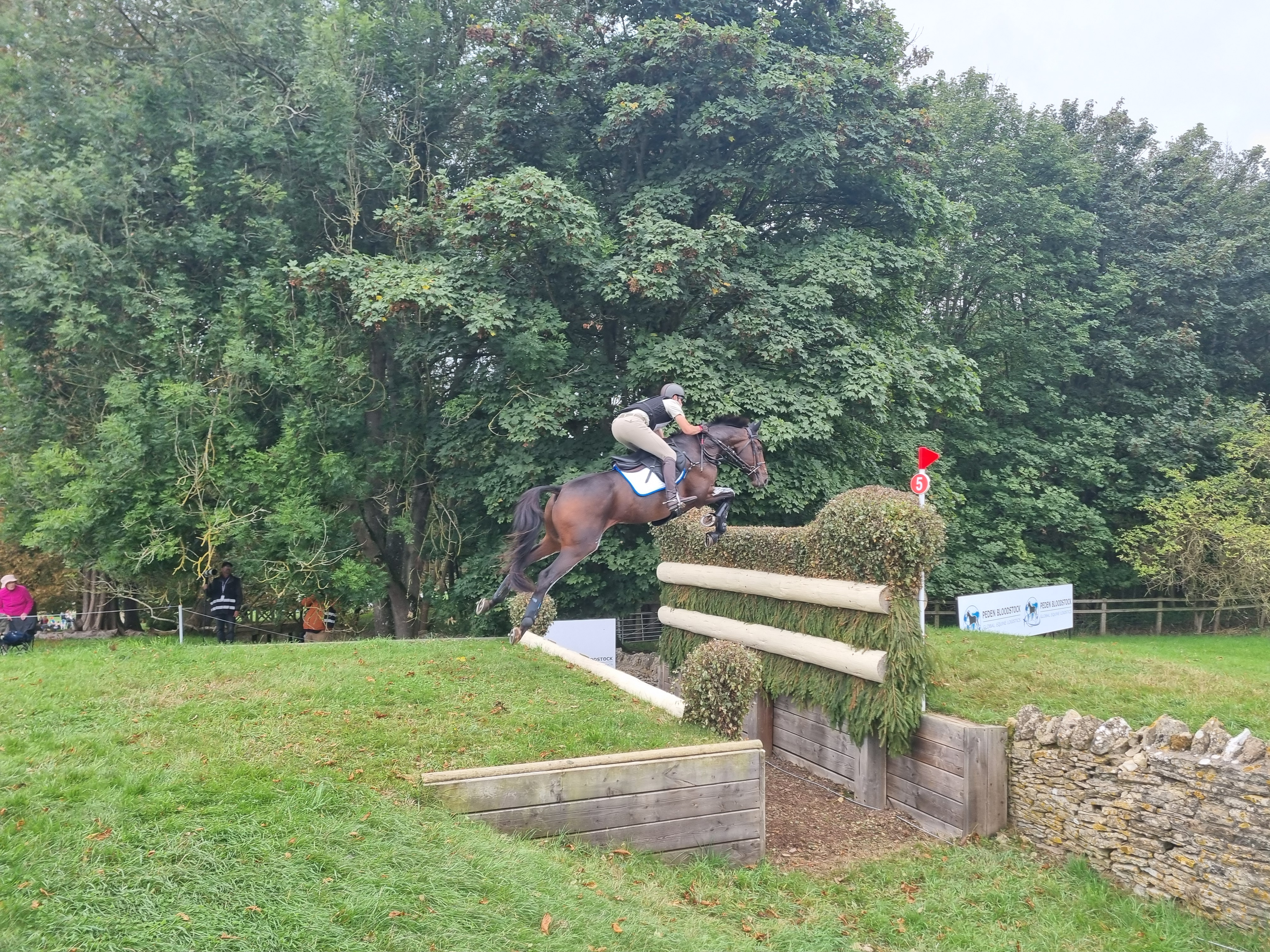
Cross-country competition

The 2025 European Eventing Championships is scheduled from 18–21 September 2025 and will be hosted at Blenheim Palace, Oxfordshire, United Kingdom. This marks the return of the senior European Eventing Championships to the UK, the first since the competition was held at Blair Castle in 2015.

The venue simultaneously hosted the CCI4* competition for 8 and 9-year-old horses, featuring a separate prize fund of £20,000.

== Schedule ==
2025 European Championships
Date	Competition
17 September	First horse inspection, opening ceremony, parade of nations
18 September	Dressage, Day 1
19 September	Dressage, Day 2
20 September	Cross-country
21 September	Second horse inspection, show jumping, prize-giving ceremony

== Prize money ==
Total prize fund: 100,000 CHF (subject to UK tax for non-UK residents) was awarded during the championships.

Team competition (35,000 CHF)		Individual competition (65,000 CHF)	
Gold	11,500 CHF	Gold	18,000 CHF
Silver	10,000 CHF	Silver	14,000 CHF
Bronze	8,500 CHF	Bronze	10,000 CHF
4th	5,000 CHF	4th	8,000 CHF
		5th	6,000 CHF
		6th	2,000 CHF
		7th	1,500 CHF
		8th–10th	1,000 CHF each

Additional 2,500 CHF divided among remaining finishers.

== Medal summary ==
=== Medals table ===
* Host nation (Great Britain)

Rank	Nation	Gold	Silver	Bronze	Total
1	Germany	1	1	0	2
2	Great Britain*	1	0	1	2
3	Ireland	0	1	0	1
4	France	0	0	1	1
Totals (4 entries)		2	2	2	6

=== Medallists ===
Event	Gold	Silver	Bronze
Individual	Laura Collett (GBR)	Michael Jung (GER)	Tom McEwen (GBR)
Team	Germany; Libussa Lübbeke; Malin Hansen-Hotopp; Jérôme Robiné; Michael Jung	Ireland; Padraig McCarthy; Robbie Kearns; Aoife Clark; Ian Cassells	France; Luc Chateau; Sebastien Cavaillon; Alexis Goury; Astier Nicolas

== Results ==
=== Individual ===
FEI Eventing European Championships 2025
Place	World Rank	Rider	Horse	Nation	Dressage	Cross-Country	Show Jumping	Total
Gold	6	Laura Collett	London 52	Great Britain	20.6	6	0.4	27
Silver	16	Michael Jung	Fischerchipmunk FRH	Germany	18.3	10	0	28.3
Bronze	5	Tom McEwen	JL Dublin	Great Britain	26.2	6.8	0	33
4	29	Calvin Böckmann	The Phantom of the Opera	Germany	30.9	5.6	0	36.5
5	14	Lea Siegl	Van Helsing P	Austria	26.9	9.6	0	36.5
6	36	Alexis Goury	Je'vall	France	31.9	14.8	0	46.7
7	20	Lara de Liedekerke-Meier	Hooney d'Arville	Belgium	27.7	16	4	46.7
8	50	Jérôme Robiné	Black Ice	Germany	30.4	13.2	4.4	48
9	95	Benjamin Massie	Figaro Fonroy	France	32.4	14.4	1.2	48
10	76	Mélody Johner	Erin	Switzerland	31.5	8	8.8	48.3
11	35	Malin Hansen-Hotopp	Carlitos Quidditch K	Germany	27.8	14	6.8	48.6
12	25	Padraig McCarthy	Pomp N Circumstance	Ireland	35.2	16.8	0	52
13	93	Nicolai Aldinger	Timmo	Germany	32.7	19.2	0.4	52.3
14	23	Ian Cassells	Millridge Atlantis	Ireland	32.6	13.6	6.8	53
15	149	Sarah Ennis	Dourough Ferro Class Act	Ireland	31.0	18	6	55
16	58	Astier Nicolas	Alertamalib'or	France	29.8	14.4	0.4	55.6
17	525	Janneke Boonzaaijer	Acsi Champ de Tailleur	Netherlands	29.9	7.2	4.4	56.5
18	46	Robbie Kearns	Chance Encounter	Ireland	33.3	19.2	4.4	56.9
19	138	Nadja Minder	Toblerone	Switzerland	34.5	12.8	12	59.3
20	186	Florinoor Hoogland	Hontoni	Netherlands	41.7	18	0	59.7
21	142	Amanda Staam	Corpoubet AT	Sweden	35.5	21.2	4.8	61.5
22	301	Noémi Viola Doerfer	Piltown Harry	Hungary	37.6	20.8	4.8	63.2
23	170	Sebastien Cavaillon	Elipso de la Vigne	France	29.0	36.2	0	65.2
24	64	Karin Donckers	Ceres de la Brasserie	Belgium	34.9	30.4	5.2	70.5
25	235	Vittoria Panizzon	DHI Jackpot	Italy	33.2	33	4.8	71
26	104	Libussa Lübbeke	Caramia 34	Germany	28.3	30	13.2	71.5
27	293	Paolo Torlonia	Zinny	Italy	39.8	27.2	6.8	73.8
28	83	Robin Godel	Global DHI	Switzerland	36.5	38	1.2	75.7
29	259	Gireg Le Coz	Caramel D'Orchis	France	34.9	39.6	1.6	76.1
30	28	Felix Vogg	Frieda	Switzerland	29.2	48.8	1.6	79.6
31	145	Pietro Majolino	Vita Louise DH Z	Italy	32.7	40.6	10	83.3
32	406	Harald Ambros	Vitorio du Montet	Austria	36.8	28.4	18.4	83.6
33	73	Susannah Berry	Clever Trick	Ireland	36.3	44.4	6.8	87.5
34	717	Katrin Khoddam-Hazrati	Renegade	Austria	35.2	46.8	5.6	87.6
35	68	Luc Chateau	Cocorico de l'Ebat	France	36.4	52.4	2	90.8
36	455	Sanna Siltakorpi	Bofey Click	Finland	34.4	47.2	10.8	92.4
37	1162	Kumru Say	Baladin de l'Ocean LA	Turkey	37.1	61.6	10.4	109.1
38	405	Pavel Brezina	Turin	Czech Republic	39.1	58	15.6	112.7
39	498	Christian Chabot	Flora-B-Lux	Luxembourg	36.0	89.2	12.4	137.6
40	238	Yasmin Olsson Payne	Cos Me Will	Norway	37.2	98.4	5.2	140.8
41	1638	Jaroslav Abik	Madock	Czech Republic	40.0	110	20.8	170.8
RET	488	Aistis Vitkauskas	Commander VG	Lithuania	41.5	Retired	RET	
RET	786	Christoffer Forsberg	Hippo's Sapporo TSF	Sweden	37.3	Retired	RET	
RET	1625	Arianna Schivo	First Lady de Belheme	Italy	40.4	Retired	RET	
RET	59	Frida Andersen	Stonehavens Baby Blue	Sweden	32.0	Retired	RET	
EL	10	Bubby Upton	Its Cooley Time	Great Britain	28.9	Eliminated	EL	
EL	24	Yasmin Ingham	Rehy DJ	Great Britain	29.0	Eliminated	EL	
EL	19	Piggy March	Halo	Great Britain	29.4	Eliminated	EL	
EL	12	Caroline Harris	D. Day	Great Britain	34.4	Eliminated	EL	
EL	1417	Daniele Bizzarro	Stormhill Riot	Italy	37.2	Eliminated	EL	
EL	158	Wouter de Cleene	Quintera	Belgium	33.8	Eliminated	EL	
EL	91	Aoife Clark	Full Monty de Lacense	Ireland	34.7	Eliminated	EL	
WD	185	Giovanni Ugolotti	Duke of Champions	Italy	32.8	45.2	Withdrew	WD
WD	266	Senne Vervaecke	Google van Alsingen	Belgium	33.8	Withdrew	WD	
WD	384	Sofia Sjöborg	Govalent	Sweden	36.8	Withdrew	WD	

=== Teams ===
FEI Eventing European Championships 2025 - Team Event
Place	Nation	Riders	Dressage	Cross-Country	Show Jumping	Total
Gold	Germany	Libussa Lübbeke; Malin Hansen-Hotopp; Jérôme Robiné; Michael Jung	74.4	39.3	11.2	124.9
Silver	Ireland	Padraig McCarthy; Robbie Kearns; Aoife Clark; Ian Cassells	100.6	50.1	11.2	161.9
Bronze	France	Luc Chateau; Sebastien Cavaillon; Alexis Goury; Astier Nicolas	75.8	91.3	0.4	167.5
4	Switzerland	Mélody Johner; Nadja Minder; Felix Vogg; Robin Godel	95.2	66.1	22	183.3
5	Austria	Harald Ambros; Lea Siegl; Katrin Khoddam-Hazrati	98.9	84.8	24	207.7
6	Great Britain	Tom McEwen; Laura Collett; Yasmin Ingham; Piggy March	75.8	1012.8	0.4	1060.0
7	Belgium	Senne Vervaecke; Karin Donckers; Lara de Liedekerke-Meier; Wouter de Cleene	95.3	1046.4	4.9	1118.2
8	Italy	Giovanni Ugolotti; Paolo Torlonia; Arianna Schivo; Vittoria Panizzon	105.8	105.4	1011.6	1144.8
9	Sweden	Sofia Sjöborg; Frida Andersen; Amanda Staam; Christoffer Forsberg	104.3	2021.2	4.8	2061.5

== Participanting countries ==
A total of 56 riders from the national teams of the following 17 countries competed.

- Austria (3)
- Belgium (4)
- Czech Republic (2)
- Finland (1)
- France (6)
- Germany (6)
- Great Britain (6)
- Hungary (2)
- Ireland (6)
- Italy (6)
- Lithuania (1)
- Luxembourg (1)
- Netherlands (2)
- Norway (1)
- Sweden (4)
- Switzerland (4)
- Turkey (1)

== Officials ==
- Ground Jury President: Sandy Phillips (GBR)
- Technical Delegate: Andrew Temkin (USA)
- Cross-Country Course Designer: Mark Phillips (GBR)
- Show Jumping Course Designer: Paul Connor (GBR)
