= Equestrian events at the 2024 Summer Olympics =

Equestrian at the Games of the XXXIII Olympiad
- Pictograms for dressage (left), eventing (center), and jumping (right)
- Venue: Palace of Versailles
- Dates: 27 July – 6 August 2024
- No. of events: 6 (6 open)
- Competitors: 200 from 49 nations

The equestrian events at the 2024 Summer Olympics in Paris were run from 27 July to 6 August at the Palace of Versailles, featuring 200 riders across three disciplines for both individual and team competitions, namely dressage, eventing, and jumping. Male and Female athletes compete together on equal terms.

== Qualification ==
The 200 quota places for equestrians were divided among the three disciplines (75 for jumping, 65 for eventing, and 60 for dressage). Teams in each discipline consisted of three horse and rider pairs; any NOC that qualified a team (20 teams for jumping, 16 for eventing, and 15 for dressage) also received 3 entries in the individual competition for that discipline. NOCs that did not qualify teams could earn one individual place in dressage and jumping, and up to two individual places in eventing, for a total of 15 entries in jumping and dressage and 17 for eventing. Teams qualify primarily through specific competitions (World Equestrian Games and continental tournaments), while individuals qualified through ranking. The host nation France automatically reserves a team place in each discipline.

== Competition format ==
=== Dressage ===
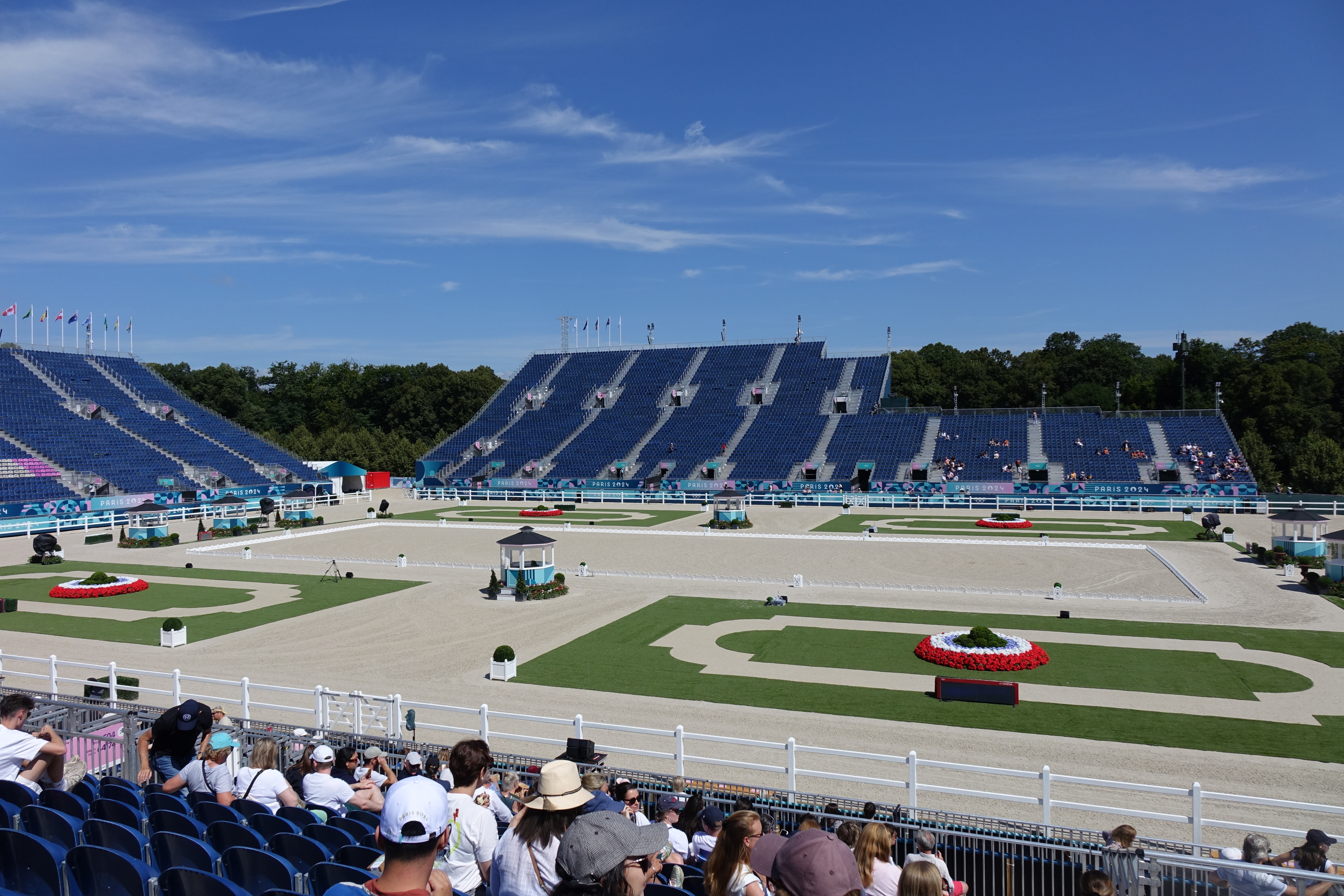
The Palace of Versailles Arena, a temporary stadium erected atop the Etoile Royale esplanade for the dressage and jumping events.

Teams are made of three athletes, all of whom are also competing for individual medals. Nations without a team can be represented by a single individual athlete.

Dressage competition starts with the Grand Prix, which serves as a qualifier for both team and individual competitions. Athletes are drawn into six heats of ten athletes each, with the opening three heats being scheduled for the first day and the remaining three heats for the second day. Heats are drawn in such a way that no more than one athlete per NOC can be assigned to the same heat. Once the Grand Prix heats are concluded, team scores are decided by adding up the individual scores of the respective team members. The top eight ranked teams qualify for the team final (Grand Prix Special), while the top two individual athletes from each heat, plus the next best six ranked athletes, qualify for the individual final (Grand Prix Freestyle).

Grand Prix Special, which is used to decide team medals, is a slightly more rigorous dressage test with emphasis on difficult transitions (such as collected walk – piaffe). As the slate is wiped clean after the Grand Prix, team medals are determined solely based on scores achieved in the Special. Nations taking part in the team final are allowed to enter a substitute athlete between the Grand Prix and up to two hours before the Special.

Grand Prix Freestyle is open for 18 athletes and is used to decide individual medals. Each athlete designs their own test for the Freestyle, which must be set to music and must contain 16 compulsory movements. Riders can tailor a test to their horses' strengths, as well as incorporate movements that are more difficult than those required in the Grand Prix or the Special (such as a pirouette in piaffe or flying changes on a curving line) in order to increase their scores. Individual medals are assigned based on scores in the Freestyle.

=== Eventing ===
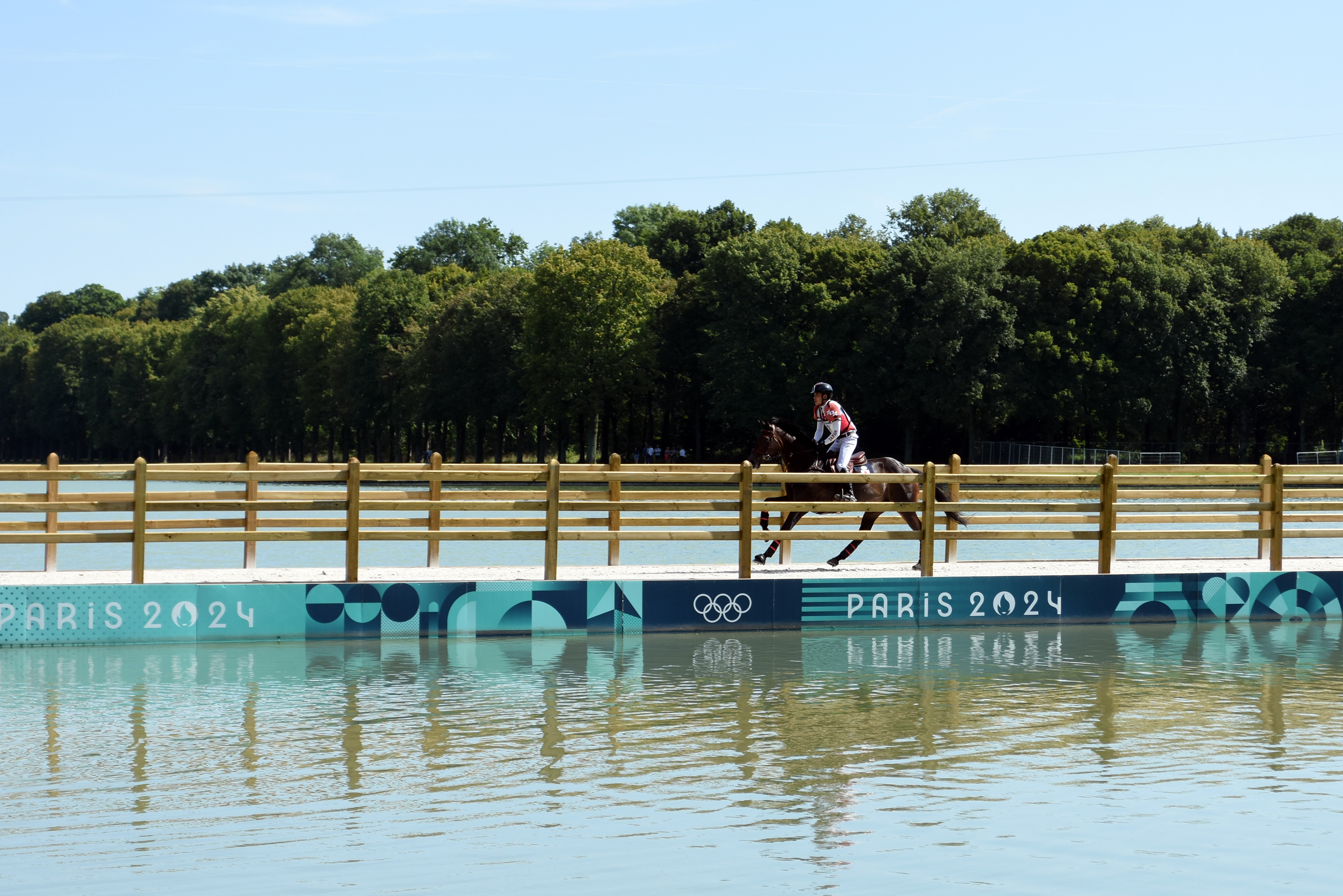
Ryuzo Kitajima and Cekatinka cross a pontoon on the Grand Canal during their cross-country run.

Competitions for team and individual medals run concurrently. Each athlete, riding the same horse, performs a dressage test, a cross-country round, and a jumping round. Team medals are then awarded by adding together the scores of team members, from all three phases. The team with the lowest number of penalty points wins the gold. The top 25 individual athletes after the first jumping round perform a second, final, jumping round to determine individual medals. Therefore, those competing for individual glory complete one dressage test and cross-country round, and two jumping rounds.

Athletes who for various reasons fail to start or finish any of the phases are eliminated from the individual competition. Teams with eliminated athletes receive penalty points: 100 penalty points for each eliminated athlete during the dressage and jumping phases, and 200 penalty points for each eliminated athlete during the cross-country phase. While they are excluded from the individual event, eliminated athletes may continue to compete in the following phases for their teams, unless they were eliminated for lameness, horse fall, horse abuse, or otherwise disqualified. Teams can additionally bring forward a reserve athlete at any point of the competition. In such a case, the respective team is awarded 20 additional penalty points.

=== Jumping ===
Individual and team competitions are run separately. Individual competition begins and will run for two days. The first competition day serves as a qualifier, where a total of 75 athletes may start. Each athlete tackles the same course, which includes 12 to 14 numbered obstacles. Athletes are ranked based on the accumulated number of penalty points, and the top 30 advance to the individual final. In case of a tie for the last qualification place, athletes are separated by the time of their round. The individual final is held on a different course that includes 12 to 15 numbered obstacles. Athletes are once again ranked based on the accumulated number of penalty points. If two or more athletes are tied for a medal position, the tie is resolved in a jump-off.

The first day of team competition serves as a qualifier and is opened to a total of 20 teams. At the end of the qualifier, teams receive their placing by adding up the penalties incurred by the three team members. Athletes who withdraw or are eliminated or who retire from the competition will not be given a score. Teams with one athlete who has withdrawn, retired, or been eliminated from the team qualifier will be placed according to the combined penalties incurred by the two athletes who completed the competition. Teams in which all three athletes completed the competition without being eliminated or retiring shall be placed before teams with only two athletes who completed the competition without being eliminated or retiring. Teams with two athletes who have withdrawn and/or retired and/or been eliminated from the competition will be eliminated. The top 10 teams based on the qualifier results advance to the team final. In case of a tie for the last qualification place, teams are separated by the combined time of their three team members. The team final is held on a different course. Teams are once again ranked based on the accumulated number of penalty points of their team members. If two or more teams are tied for a medal position, the tie is resolved in a jump-off.

== Disqualification ==
Team Belgium was disqualified from the Eventing team competition after finishing in fourth position due to a positive banned substance result. Rider Tine Magnus's horse, Dia Van Het Lichterveld Z, was found to have the presence of Trazodone in its system during competition.

== Competition schedule ==
All times use Central European Summer Time (UTC+2)

Day	Date	Start	Finish	Event	Phase
Day 1	27 July	09:30	18:30	Individual eventing	Dressage
Day 1	27 July	09:30	18:30	Team eventing	Dressage
Day 2	28 July	10:30	15:00	Individual eventing	Cross-country
Day 2	28 July	10:30	15:00	Team eventing	Cross-country
Day 3	29 July	11:00	13:30	Team eventing	Jumping
Day 3	29 July	15:00	16:00	Individual eventing	Jumping
Day 4	30 July	11:00	16:30	Individual dressage	Dressage Grand Prix Day 1
Day 4	30 July	11:00	16:30	Team dressage	Dressage Grand Prix Day 1
Day 5	31 July	10:00	15:30	Individual dressage	Dressage Grand Prix Day 2
Day 5	31 July	10:00	15:30	Team dressage	Dressage Grand Prix Day 2
Day 6	1 August	11:00	14:00	Team jumping	Qualification
Day 7	2 August	14:00	16:00	Team jumping	Final
Day 8	3 August	10:00	15:30	Team dressage	Grand Prix Special
Day 9	4 August	10:00	14:00	Individual dressage	Grand Prix Freestyle
Day 10	5 August	14:00	18:00	Individual jumping	Qualification
Day 11	6 August	10:00	12:00	Individual jumping	Final

== Participating nations ==
A total of 49 NOCs qualified equestrians.

- Argentina (1)
- Australia (9)
- Austria (8)
- Belgium (9)
- Brazil (9)
- Canada (9)
- Chile (1)
- China (2)
- Colombia (1)
- Czech Republic (2)
- Denmark (3)
- Dominican Republic (1)
- Ecuador (1)
- Egypt (1)
- Estonia (1)
- Finland (5)
- France (9)
- Germany (9)
- Great Britain (9)
- Greece (1)
- Hungary (1)
- India (1)
- Ireland (7)
- Israel (3)
- Italy (3)
- Japan (6)
- South Korea (1)
- Latvia (1)
- Lithuania (2)
- Luxembourg (2)
- Moldova (1)
- Mexico (3)
- Morocco (1)
- Netherlands (9)
- Norway (2)
- New Zealand (2)
- Poland (9)
- Portugal (5)
- Saudi Arabia (3)
- Singapore (1)
- South Africa (1)
- Spain (8)
- Sweden (9)
- Switzerland (6)
- Syria (1)
- Thailand (1)
- United Arab Emirates (3)
- United States (9)
- Venezuela (1)

== Medal summary ==
The medal table was dominated by Germany and Great Britain, taking all six gold medals and 10 of a possible 18 medals in total between them.

=== Medal table ===
* Host nation (France)

Rank	NOC	Gold	Silver	Bronze	Total
1	Germany	4	1	0	5
2	Great Britain	2	0	3	5
3	France*	0	1	1	2
4	Australia	0	1	0	1
4	Denmark	0	1	0	1
4	Switzerland	0	1	0	1
4	United States	0	1	0	1
8	Japan	0	0	1	1
8	Netherlands	0	0	1	1
Totals (9 entries)		6	6	6	18

=== Medalists ===
Games	Gold	Silver	Bronze
Individual dressage	Jessica von Bredow-Werndl on TSF Dalera BB; Germany	Isabell Werth on Wendy; Germany	Charlotte Fry on Glamourdale; Great Britain
Team dressage	Germany; Frederic Wandres on Bluetooth Old; Isabell Werth on Wendy; Jessica von Bredow-Werndl on TSF Dalera BB	Denmark; Daniel Bachmann Andersen on Vayron; Nanna Merrald Rasmussen on Zepter; Cathrine Laudrup-Dufour on Freestyle	Great Britain; Becky Moody on Jagerbomb; Carl Hester on Fame; Charlotte Fry on Glamourdale
Individual eventing	Michael Jung on Chipmunk Frh; Germany	Christopher Burton on Shadow Man; Australia	Laura Collett on London 52; Great Britain
Team eventing	Great Britain; Rosalind Canter on Lordships Graffalo; Tom McEwen on Jl Dublin; Laura Collett on London 52	France; Nicolas Touzaint on Diabolo Menthe; Karim Laghouag on Triton Fontaine; Stéphane Landois on Chaman Dumontceau	Japan; Toshiyuki Tanaka on Jefferson; Kazuma Tomoto on Vinci De La Vigne; Yoshiaki Oiwa on Mgh Grafton Street; Ryuzo Kitajima on Cekatinka
Individual jumping	Christian Kukuk on Checker 47; Germany	Steve Guerdat on Dynamix de Belheme; Switzerland	Maikel van der Vleuten on Beauville Z Netherlands
Team jumping	Great Britain; Ben Maher on Dallas Vegas Batilly; Harry Charles on Romeo 88; Scott Brash on Jefferson	United States; Laura Kraut on Baloutinue; Karl Cook on Caracole de la Roque; McLain Ward on Ilex	France; Simon Delestre on I.Alemusina R 51; Olivier Perreau on Dorai D'Aiguilly; Julien Epaillard on Dubai du Cèdre

== See also ==
- Equestrian events at the 2022 Asian Games
- Equestrian events at the 2023 Pan American Games
- Equestrian events at the 2024 Summer Paralympics
