= Gemma Tattersall =

British equestrian

Gemma Stevens
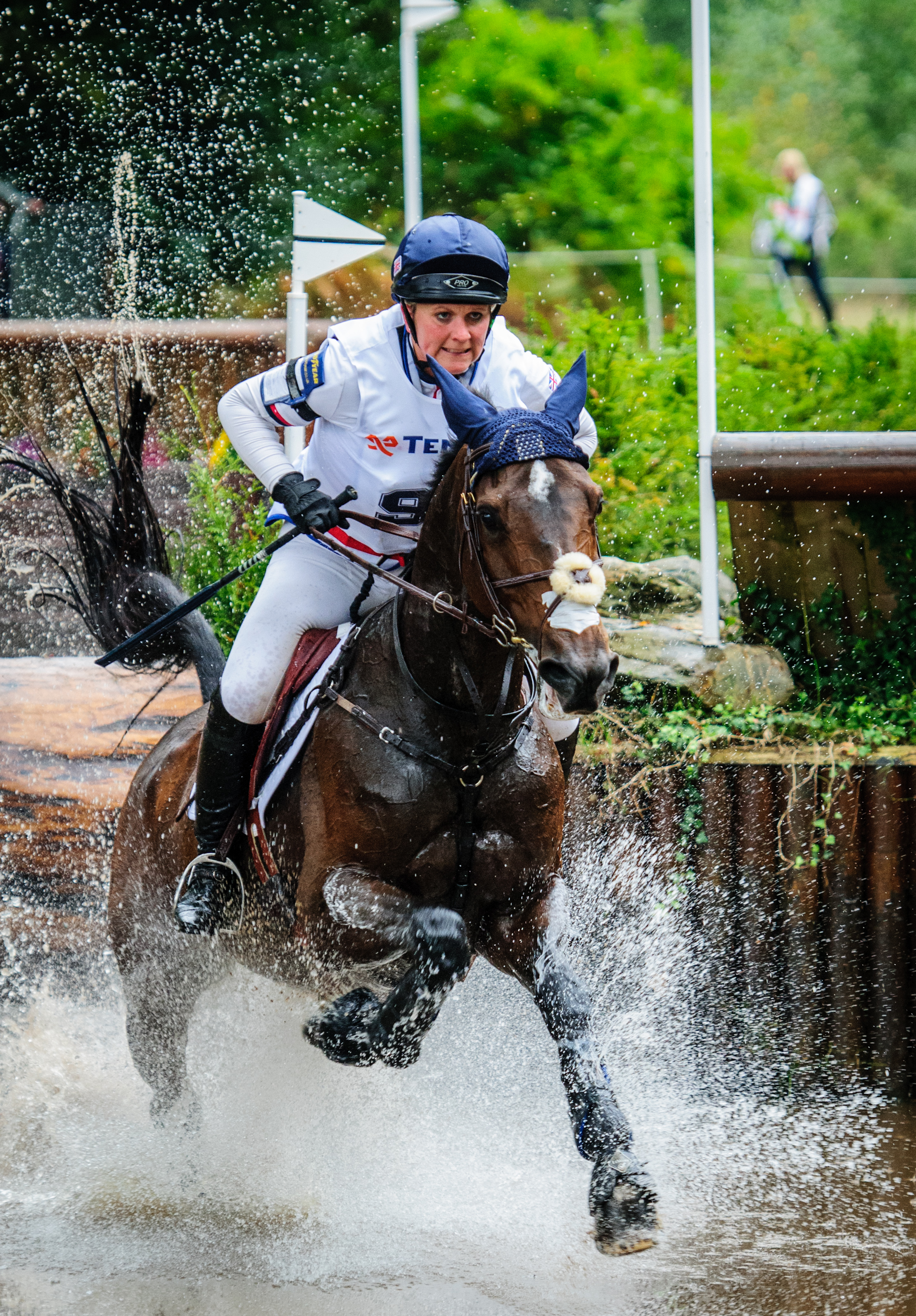
- Gemma Tattersall riding Chico Bella at Boekelo Horse Trials (2013)

Personal information
- Born: Gemma Tattersall; 12 March 1985 (age 41) Hailsham, England
Medal record
Equestrian
Representing Great Britain
World Championships
Gold medal – first place	2018 Tryon	Team eventing
Gold medal – first place	2026 Aachen	Team eventing

Gemma Stevens (née Tattersall; born 12 March 1985 in Hailsham, England) is a British Olympic eventing rider. She competed at the 2016 Summer Olympics in Rio de Janeiro where she finished 41st in the individual and 5th in the team competition.

Stevens also participated at the 2015 European Eventing Championships, finishing 9th in the individual event. Gemma has previously been part of the junior and young rider European Championship squads. She was reserve for Great Britain at the World Equestrian Games with and Arctic Soul in 2014. Tattersall was listed in the Spear's 500 in the Equine Category.

Stevens was one of 130 athletes selected as part of the Ambition programme to attend the London Olympics in order to prepare those with potential to represent Britain at a future Games.

== CCI 5* performance ==
She won the only CCI 5* event hosted in 2021, the Bicton Arena International 5*, on Chilli Knight. She finished less than a point in front of second place Pippa Funnell, and six points clear of third placed Piggy March.

=== Results ===
Results
Event	Kentucky	Badminton	Luhmühlen	Burghley	Pau	Adelaide	Maryland	Bicton
2007		34th (Jesters Quest)		36th (Jesters Quest)				
2008-2009	Did not participate							
2010					EL (Kings Gem)			
2011		EL (Kings Gem)						
2012					10th (Stormhill Kossack) 28th (Kings Gem)			
2013	Did not participate							
2014		EL (Arctic Soul)		5th (Arctic Soul)				
2015		16th (Arctic Soul)						
2016		(bronze) (Arctic Soul)						
2017		7th (Arctic Soul)		(bronze) (Arctic Soul)				
2018		4th (Arctic Soul) 22nd (Pamero 4)			(silver) (Pamero 4) 23rd (Santiago Bay)			
2019		20th (Arctic Soul)		7th (Santiago Bay) EL (Arctic Soul)	WD (Chilli Knight) WD (Jalapeño)			
2020	Did not participate							
2021		Cancelled due to Covid-19		Cancelled due to Covid-19 (replaced by Bicton)				(gold) (Chilli Knight)
EL = Eliminated; RET = Retired; WD = Withdrew
