= Ros Canter =

British equestrian

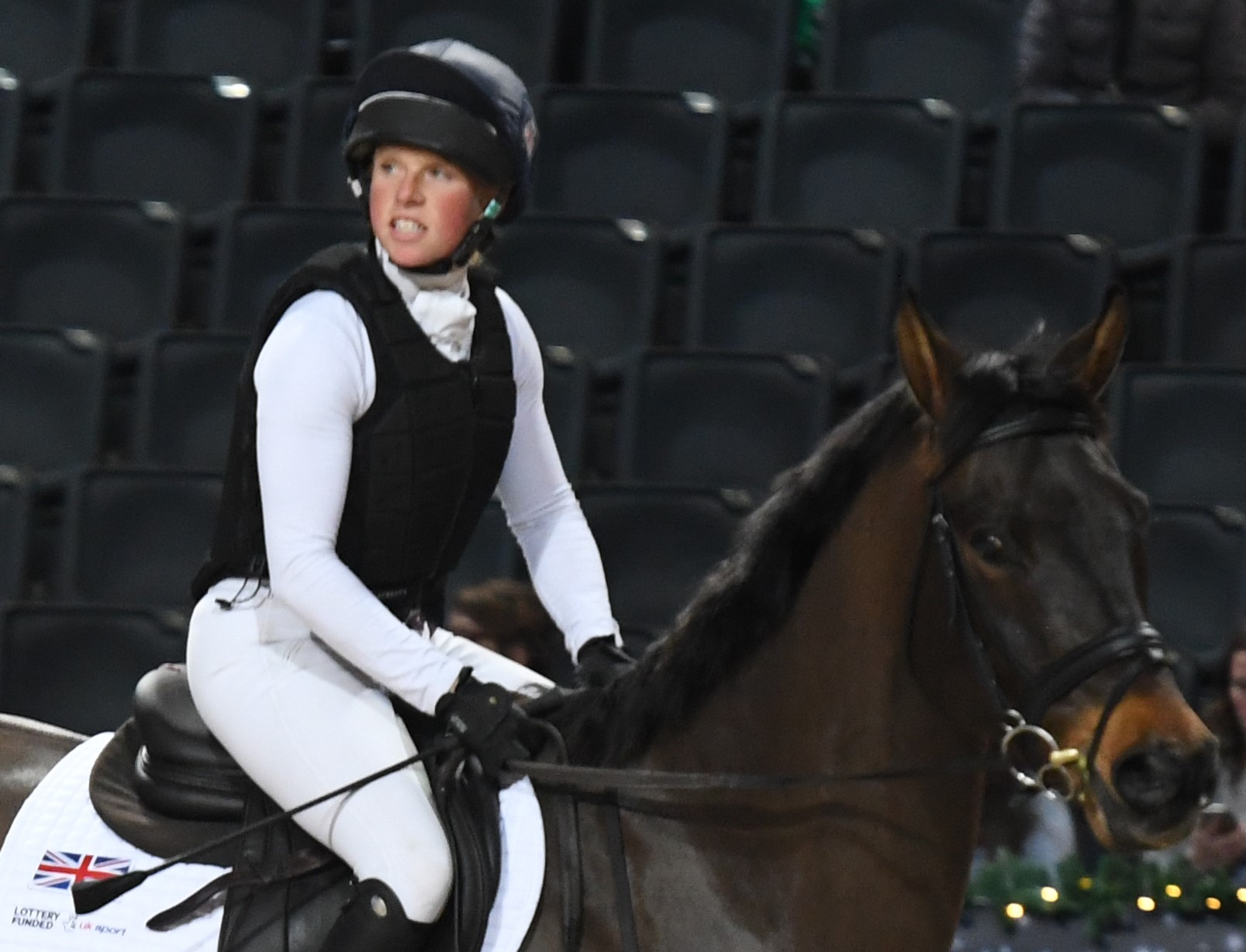
- Canter and Las Vegas during indoor cross-country at the Sweden International Horse Show 2018

Personal information
- Full name: Rosalind Amy Canter
- Born: 13 January 1986 (age 40) Grimsby, England
Medal record
Equestrian
Representing Great Britain
Olympic Games
Gold medal – first place	2024 Paris	Team eventing
World Championships
Gold medal – first place	2018 Tryon	Individual eventing
Gold medal – first place	2018 Tryon	Team eventing
Gold medal – first place	2026 Aachen	Team eventing
Silver medal – second place	2026 Aachen	Individual eventing
European Championships
Gold medal – first place	2023 Haras du Pin	Individual eventing
Gold medal – first place	2023 Haras du Pin	Team eventing
Gold medal – first place	2021 Avenches	Team eventing
Gold medal – first place	2017 Strzegom	Team eventing

Rosalind Amy Canter (born 13 January 1986) is a British equestrian who competes in eventing. She is the 2018 World Champion. On Monday, 8 May 2023 and Sunday, 11 May 2025 she won the Badminton Horse Trials riding Lordships Graffalo both times. On Sunday, 10 May 2026 she won Badminton Horse Trials for a third time riding Lordships Graffalo, making history as the first horse and rider pair to win Badminton 3 times. On the 7th of September 2025 she also won the Defender Burghley Horse Trials on Lordships Graffalo for the second year running. She won a gold medal in Team eventing at 2024 Paris Olympics.

== Early life ==
Canter grew up on the family farm in Hallington, Lincolnshire.

She attended Kidgate Junior School in Louth, and was also a competitive swimmer in the mid-1990s, with her sister Megan. She also competed in cross country running, when at the grammar school in Louth, alongside her sister Harriet. And with Harriet, and her other sister Megan, she played hockey for Louth Ladies and Louth Juniors. Both Megan and Harriet also competed in equestrian events, in the 1990s.

She has a degree in sports science from Sheffield Hallam University.

== Career ==
Canter's CCI **** results include wins at both Badminton Horse Trials in 2023, 2025 and 2026, the Burghley Horse Trials in 2024 and 2025 on Lordships Graffalo, and at Stars of Pau in 2023 on Izilot DHI. At the Tokyo and Paris Olympics (2020 and 2024 respectively) she won team gold with Lordships Graffalo. She won team gold and finished fifth individually at the 2017 European Eventing Championships on Allstar B, before finishing seventh at the 2017 Stars of Pau on Zenshera. In May 2018, she finished third at the Badminton Horse Trials on Allstar B.

Canter won two golds at the 2018 FEI World Equestrian Games in Tryon, riding Allstar B. She is the fifth British rider to become World Champion in Eventing, after Mary Gordon-Watson (1970), Lucinda Green (1982), Virginia Leng (1986), and Zara Phillips (2006).

In 2022 she competed with Lordships Graffalo in the World Eventing Championships in Pratoni del Vivaro as a member of the British Team, where they finished 4th individually and as a team.

At the 2024 Summer Olympics, held in Paris, Canter won a gold medal in Team Eventing, alongside Laura Collett and Tom McEwen.

== CCI5* Results ==
Results
Event	Kentucky	Badminton	Luhmühlen	Burghley	Pau	Adelaide	Bicton
2015				37th (Allstar B)			
2016		WD (Allstar B)		25th (Allstar B)			
2017		5th (Allstar B)	9th (Zenshera)		7th (Zenshera)		
2018		(bronze) (Allstar B)	(bronze) (Zenshera)		5th (Zenshera)		
2019					5th (Zenshera)		
2020	Cancelled due to Covid-19	Cancelled due to Covid-19	Cancelled due to Covid-19	Cancelled due to Covid-19		Cancelled due to Covid-19	
2021		Cancelled due to Covid-19		Cancelled due to Covid-19 (replaced by Chedington Bicton Five Star)		Cancelled due to Covid-19	4th (Pencos Crown Jewel)
2022		(silver) (Lordships Graffalo) 12th (Allstar B)					
2023		(gold) (Lordships Graffalo) 9th (Pencos Crown Jewel)		EL (Pencos Crown Jewel)	(gold) (Izilot DHI) 24th (Pencos Crown Jewel)		
2024		RET (Izilot DHI)		(gold) (Lordships Graffalo) RET (Izilot DHI)			
2025		(gold) (Lordships Graffalo)	(gold) (Izilot DHI)	(gold) (Lordships Graffalo)			
2026		(gold) (Lordships Graffalo)					
EL = Eliminated; RET = Retired; WD = Withdrew							

== International Championship Results ==
Results
Year	Event	Horse	Placing	Notes
2011	World Young Horse Championships	Aprobanta	2nd place, silver medalist(s)	CCI*
2016	World Young Horse Championships	Pencos Crown Jewel	30th	CCI**
2017	European Championships	Allstar B	1st place, gold medalist(s)	Team
2017	European Championships	Allstar B	5th	Individual
2018	World Equestrian Games	Allstar B	1st place, gold medalist(s)	Team
2018	World Equestrian Games	Allstar B	1st place, gold medalist(s)	Individual
2020	World Young Horse Championships	Izilot DHI	EL	CCI***
2021	European Championships	Allstar B	1st place, gold medalist(s)	Team
2021	European Championships	Allstar B	45th	Individual
2022	World Championships	Lordships Graffalo	4th	Team
2022	World Championships	Lordships Graffalo	4th	Individual
2023	European Championships	Lordships Graffalo	1st place, gold medalist(s)	Team
2023	European Championships	Lordships Graffalo	1st place, gold medalist(s)	Individual
2024	Olympics	Lordships Graffalo	1st place, gold medalist(s)	Team
2024	Olympics	Lordships Graffalo	21st	Individual
EL = Eliminated; RET = Retired; WD = Withdrew

== Notable Horses ==
- Zenshera
  - 2018 Luhmuhlen 5* third place
- Allstar B
  - 2017 European Championships - team gold, individual 5th
  - 2018 Badminton Horse Trials third place
  - 2018 World Equestrian Games - team & individual gold
  - 2021 European Championships - team gold
- Lordships Graffalo
  - 2022 Badminton Horse Trials runner up
  - 2023 Badminton Horse Trials winner
  - 2023 European Championships - team & individual gold
  - 2024 Olympics - team gold
  - 2024 Burghley Horse Trials winner
  - 2025 Badminton Horse Trials winner
  - 2025 Burghley Horse Trials Winner
  - 2026 Badminton Horse Trials winner
- Izilot DHI
  - 2023 Pau 5* winner
  - 2024 Pau 5* runner-up
  - 2025 Luhmühlen 5* winner
