= Yasmin Ingham =

English show jumper

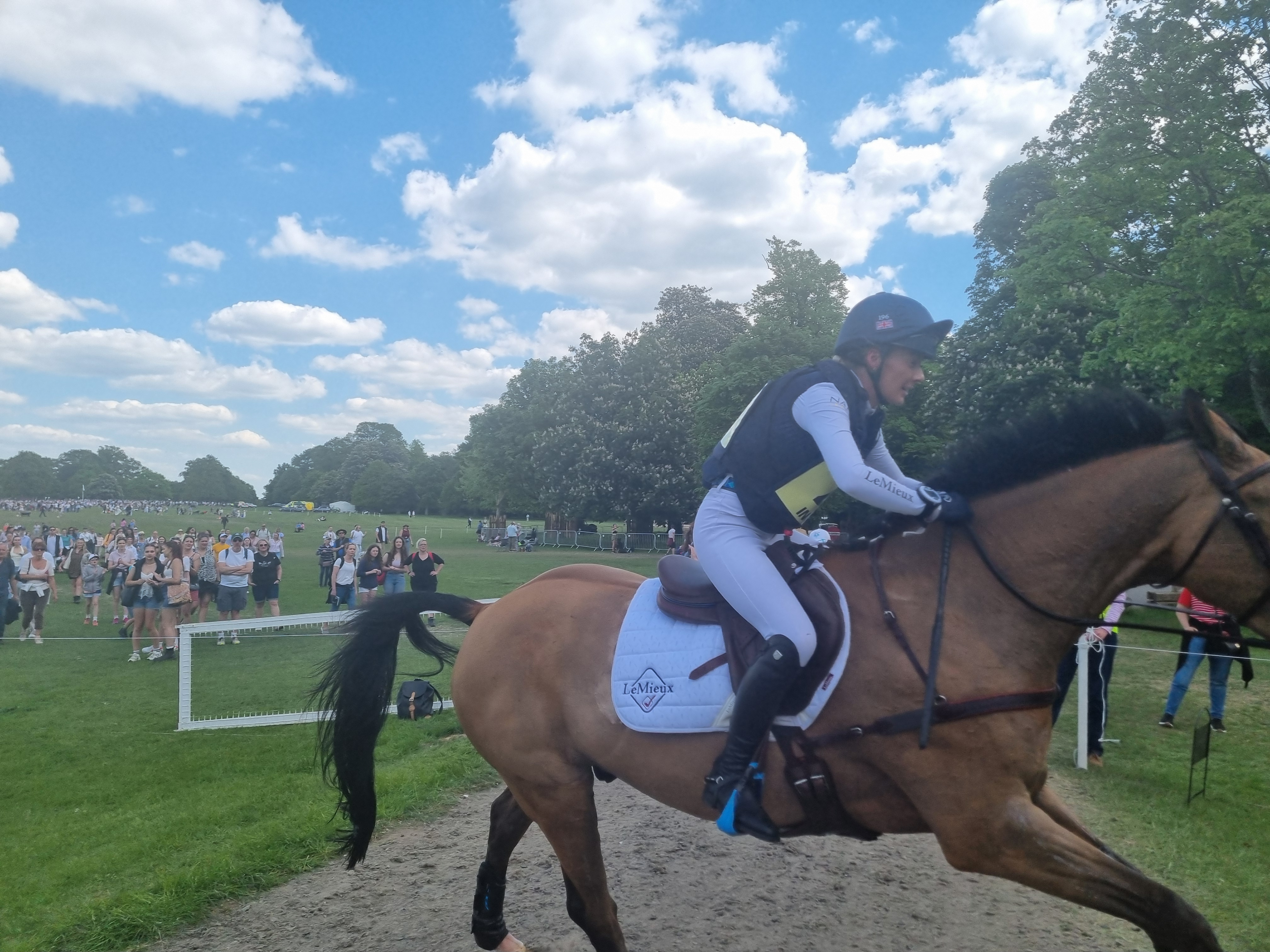
- Yasmin Ingham at the Badminton Horse Trials 2025

Personal information
- Nationality: British
- Born: 13 May 1997 (age 29)

Sport
- Sport: Equestrian
Medal record
Equestrian
Representing Great Britain
World Championships
| Gold medal – first place | 2022 Pratoni | Individual eventing |
European Championships
| Gold medal – first place | 2023 Haras du Pin | Team eventing |
Pony European Eventing Championships
| Gold medal – first place | Arezzo 2013 | Team eventing |
| Gold medal – first place | Arezzo 2013 | Individual eventing |

Yasmin Ingham (born 13 May 1997) is a British equestrian. In 2022 Ingham won individual gold at the World Eventing Championships riding Banzai du Loir. In June 2024, she was confirmed as part of the Great Britain team to compete at the 2024 Paris Olympics.

== Early life ==
Ingham is from Greeba (German), Isle of Man and attended Queen Elizabeth II High School in Peel. Her mother Lesley manages a large equestrian centre called Kennaa. Ingham said her first words were "on it" when she was petting her mother's horse, Remy.

== Career ==
Ingham joined the Isle of Man branch of the Pony Club and competed in hunter showing classes and qualified for the Royal International Horse Show and Horse of the Year Show before deciding she wanted to concentrate on eventing in 2010. In 2012, riding Craig Mor Tom in Fontainebleau she competed for the first time for the British team at the Pony European Eventing Championships. They did so again in 2013 in Arezzo, Italy where they won both individual and team gold medals. In 2013 she was named Isle of Man Sportswoman of the Year. In 2015, riding Mary King's former Mount Imperial Cavalier (or 'Archie') she won the British national junior title. In 2018, riding Rehy DJ Ingham won the National Young Rider Championships at Houghton Hall and then finished fourth at the Young Rider Europeans in Fontainebleau. In 2019 Ingham won her fourth age-group British championships when riding Sandman 7 they triumphed in the under-25 British Championship.

Ingham made her five-star in the spring of 2022 in Kentucky and finished second behind Michael Jung and his horse FischerChipmunk. In 2022 on her senior World Championship debut, Ingham clinched individual gold at the World Eventing Championships riding Banzai du Loir. They were third after the dressage and second after the cross country before going clear in the show jumping at Pratoni del Vivaro, Italy, to finish ahead of 2020 Olympic winner Julia Krajewski aboard Amande de B'Neville in silver and New Zealand's Tim Price with Falco in bronze.

A year later she achieved a third place finish at the Luhmuhlen five-star, won the four-star SAP-Cup and won team gold with Banzai du Loir, representing Great Britain at the 2023 European Championships. She also claimed second place at the Blenheim four-star that year. Ingham achieved her best five-star result to date at the 2024 Kentucky Three-Day Event, finishing second to GB teammate Oliver Townend. In May 2024, she was one of the British nominated entries for the Paris 2024 Olympic Games. In June 2024, she was confirmed as part of the Great Britain team to compete at the 2024 Paris Olympics on Banzai du Loir. As a reserve rider, she did not compete, but Team GB successfully defended their Olympic title, taking the gold medal ahead of France.

In August 2025, she was selected for the British team for the European Eventing Championships held in Blenheim, on Rehy DJ, alongside Tom McEwen and Laura Collett from the 2024 Olympic squad as well as Bubby Upton and Caroline Harris, although she and Upton both suffered falls during the cross country event.
