= Aoife Clark =

Irish equestrian

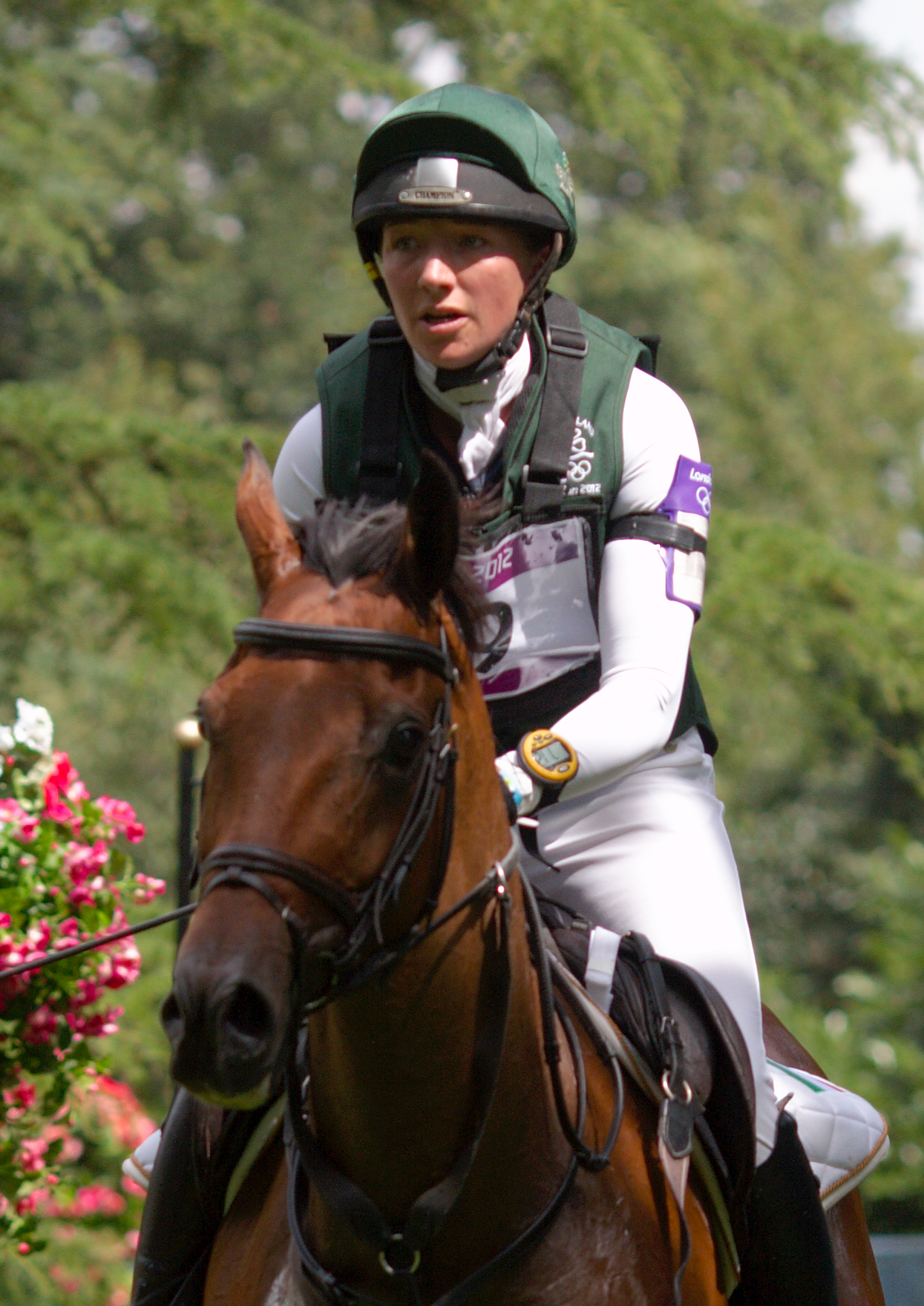
- Clark and Master Crusoe competing at the 2012 Summer Olympics in London, England

Personal information
- Born: 6 August 1981 (age 44) Dublin, Ireland
- Height: 173 cm (5 ft 8 in)

Sport
- Country: Ireland
- Sport: Equestrian
- Event: Eventing
Medal record
European Eventing Championships
| Silver medal – second place | 2025 Blenheim | Team eventing |

Aoife Clark (born 6 August 1981 in Dublin) is an Irish equestrian. At the 2012 Summer Olympics in London, England, she finished 7th in the Individual eventing, riding Master Crusoe, Ireland's best individual finish at an Olympic Games.

Clark was part of the Irish team at the 2024 Summer Olympics as the alternate combination. After Sarah Ennis withdrew Action Lady M prior to the horse inspection on show jumping day, Clark rode Freelance in showjumping in the team competition.
