= Astier Nicolas =

French equestrian (born 1989)

Personal information
- Nationality: French
- Born: 19 January 1989 (age 37) Toulouse, France
- Height: 1.80 m (5 ft 11 in)
- Weight: 70 kg (154 lb)

Sport
- Country: France
- Sport: Equestrianism
Medal record
Equestrian
Representing France
Olympic Games
Gold medal – first place	2016 Rio de Janeiro	Team eventing
Silver medal – second place	2016 Rio de Janeiro	Individual eventing
European Championships
Bronze medal – third place	2013 Malmö	Team eventing
Bronze medal – third place	2025 Blenheim	Team eventing

Astier Nicolas (born 19 January 1989) is a French equestrian. He represented his country at the 2016 Summer Olympics, where he won the gold medal in the team eventing and the silver in the individual eventing.

== Biography ==
Astier Nicolas started horse riding at the age of 7, under the guidance of his mother. Three years later, he started the Pony competitions, becoming a member of the France team pony competition, at the age of 15. He won several awards with Java Bleu La Bree. The awards continued in the junior category and then Young riders, in 2009 he became vice-champion of eventing young riders of Europe.

Astier's first senior championships were 2013 European Eventing Championships. At the competition held in Malmö, Sweden, Astier won a team bronze and placed 24th in the individual portion. In 2015, Astier took victory in the prestigious Les Etoiles de Pau 4* event.

== CCI 5* results ==
Results
Event	Kentucky	Badminton	Luhmühlen	Burghley	Pau	Adelaide
2011			18th (Jhakti du Janlie)		21st (Jhakti du Janlie)	
2012					6th (Jhakti du Janlie)	
2013		9th (Piaf de B'Neville)		EL (Quickly du Buguet)		
2014	Did not participate					
2015					(gold) (Piaf de B'Neville); EL (Quickly du Buguet)	
2016		14th (Quickly du Buguet)			17th (Molakai)	
2017		15th (Piaf de B'Neville)	EL (Molakai)		6th (Molakai)	
2018	Did not participate					
EL = Eliminated; RET = Retired; WD = Withdrew

== International championship results ==
Results
Year	Event	Horse	Placing	Notes
2005	European Pony Championships	Java Bleue La Bree	7th	Team
2005	European Pony Championships	Java Bleue La Bree	6th	Individual
2006	European Junior Championships	Jhakti du Janline	3rd place, bronze medalist(s)	Team
2006	European Junior Championships	Jhakti du Janline	8th	Individual
2007	European Junior Championships	Jhakti du Janline	3rd place, bronze medalist(s)	Team
2007	European Junior Championships	Jhakti du Janline	5th	Individual
2008	European Young Rider Championships	Jhakti du Janline	3rd place, bronze medalist(s)	Team
2008	European Young Rider Championships	Jhakti du Janline	10th	Individual
2009	European Young Rider Championships	Jhakti du Janline	5th	Team
2009	European Young Rider Championships	Jhakti du Janline	2nd place, silver medalist(s)	Individual
2010	European Young Rider Championships	Jhakti du Janline	12th	Team
2010	European Young Rider Championships	Jhakti du Janline	EL	Individual
2011	World Young Horse Championships	Quickly du Buguet	17th	CCI**
2013	World Young Horse Championships	Spes Addit'or	6th	CCI**
2013	European Championships	Piaf de B'Neville	3rd place, bronze medalist(s)	Team
2013	European Championships	Piaf de B'Neville	24th	Individual
2016	World Young Horse Championships	Vinci de la Vigne	5th	CCI**
2016	Olympic Games	Piaf de B'Neville	1st place, gold medalist(s)	Team
2016	Olympic Games	Piaf de B'Neville	2nd place, silver medalist(s)	Individual
2017	World Young Horse Championships	Alertamalib'or	1st place, gold medalist(s)	CCI**
2018	World Equestrian Games	Vinci de la Vigne	7th	Individual
2019	World Young Horse Championships	Lumberton	9th	CCI***
EL = Eliminated; RET = Retired; WD = Withdrew

== Notable horses ==
- Java Bleue La Bree - 1997 Chestnut Pony Mare (La Bree Eros x Trefaes Bach)
  - 2005 European Pony Championships - Team Seventh Place, Individual Sixth Place
- Jhakti du Janlie - 1997 Bay Selle Francais Gelding (Bhakti de Beaupre x Question Mark)
  - 2006 European Junior Championships - Team Bronze Medal, Individual Eighth Place
  - 2007 European Junior Championships - Team Bronze Medal, Individual Fifth Place
  - 2008 European Young Rider Championships - Team Sixth Place, Individual Tenth Place
  - 2009 European Young Rider Championships - Team Fifth Place, Individual Silver Medal
- Piaf de B'Neville - 2003 Bay Selle Francais Gelding (Caprice D'Elle II x Reve D'Elle)
  - 2013 European Championships - Team Bronze Medal, Individual 24th Place
  - 2015 Pau CCI**** Winner
  - 2016 Rio Olympics - Team Gold Medal, Individual Silver Medal
- Vinci de la Vinge - 2009 Bay Selle Francais Gelding (Esterel Des Bois SF x Duc du Hutrel)
  - 2016 FEI Eventing Young Horse World Championships - Fifth Place
  - 2018 World Equestrian Games - Seventh Place Individual
- Alertamalib'or - 2010 Bay Anglo-Arabian Gelding (Yarlands Summer Song x Prince Ig'or)
  - 2017 FEI Eventing Young Horse World Championships - Gold Medal
