= Malin Hansen-Hotopp =

German equestrian (born 1977)

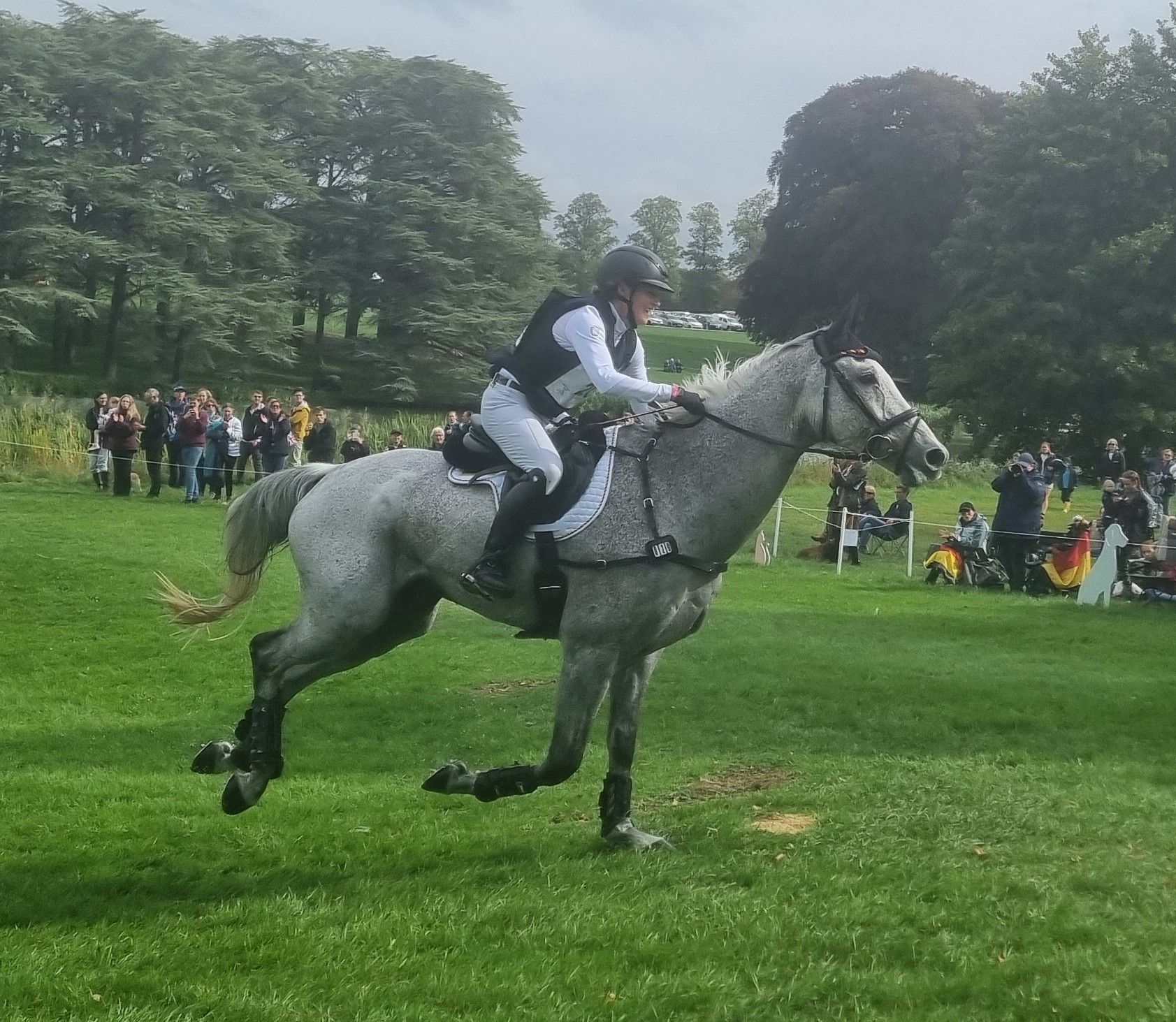
- 2025 European Eventing Championships

Personal information
- Born: 30 December 1977 (age 48) Maasbüll, West Germany

Sport
- Country: Germany
- Sport: Equestrian
Medal record
Representing Germany
Equestrian
World Championships
Silver medal – second place	2026 Aachen	Team eventing
European Championships
Gold medal – first place	2025 Blenheim	Team eventing
Silver medal – second place	2023 Haras du Pin	Team eventing

Malin Hansen-Hotopp (born 30 December 1977) is a German equestrian.

== Early life ==
She was brought up in Maasbüll in Schleswig-Holstein. She competed in the German Pony Championship for the first time in 1992. She studied agriculture in Rostock and Kiel.

== Career ==
She became European team champion in 1996 in the under-21 age group.

She won the 2022 Blenheim Horse Trials, competing in Britain for the first time, on Bodil Ipsen’s Carlito’s Quidditch K. They led the competition after the dressage, and jumped clear with only time faults. She was part of the German team which won the FEI Nations Cup event in Haras du Pin in August 2022.

She was a silver medalist in the team eventing at the 2023 European Eventing Championships in Haras du Pin on Carlitos Quidditch K in her senior championship debut.

== Personal life ==
Her father Klaus Hansen was an event trainer and trained future Olympic gold medalist Peter Thomsen. She is married to Thomas Hotopp and has three sons named Jasper, Frode and Jarne. They live in Gransebieth in Mecklenburg-Vorpommern.
