= Libussa Lübbeke =

German equestrian

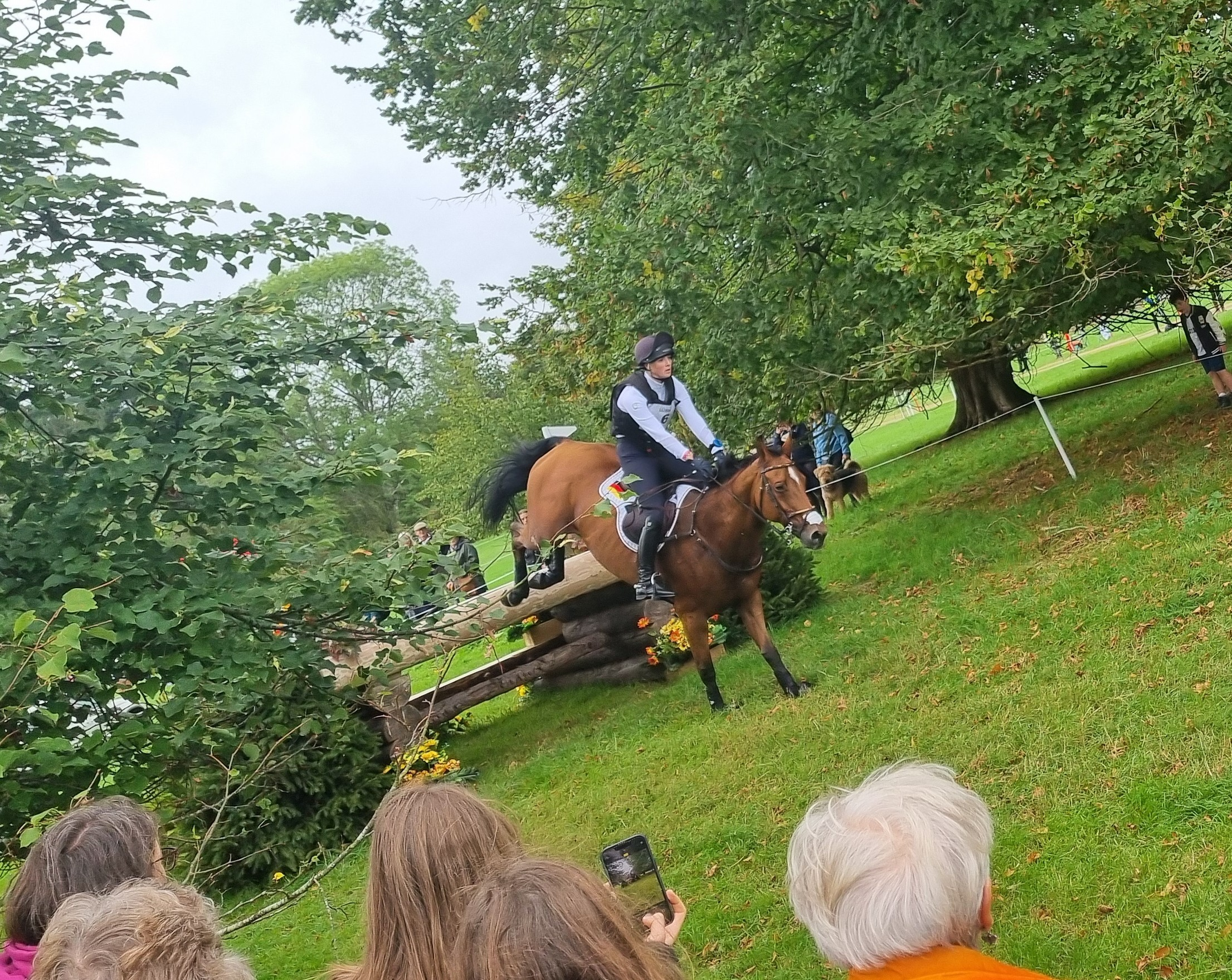
- 2025 European Eventing Championships

Personal information
- Nationality: German
- Born: 15 January 2001 (age 25)

Sport
- Country: Germany
- Sport: Equestrian
- Event: Eventing
Medal record
Representing Germany
Equestrian
World Championships
Silver medal – second place	2026 Aachen	Team eventing
European Championships
Gold medal – first place	2025 Blenheim	Team eventing

Libussa Lübbeke (born 15 January 2001) is a German equestrian who competes in eventing.

== Early life and background ==
Lübbeke was born in 2001 in Germany. She comes from an equestrian family, with her parents Annelie and Martin Lübbeke being involved in horse breeding. She has a brother, Fritz, who also competed in eventing.

== Career ==
Lübbeke had a successful youth career, competing at Pony and Young Rider levels. She participated in two Young Rider European Championships with two different horses, earning three youth medals throughout her junior career.

Lübbeke made her first 4* competition debut at age 20 and competed in her first Senior German Championship at 21. In the same year, she competed at Boekelo with two horses. In 2023, at age 22, she made her debut at the prestigious CHIO Aachen, competing with her homebred mare Caramia 34.

The 2025 season marked a breakthrough year for Lübbeke. She was part of the German team that won gold at the FEI Eventing Nations Cup in Arville, Belgium, where she finished sixth individually with Caramia 34.

Lübbeke represents Germany in international eventing competitions. She achieved her most significant success at the 2025 European Eventing Championships held at Blenheim Palace, where she was part of the German team that won the gold medal in the team eventing competition.

== Major results ==
=== European Championships ===
- 2025 Blenheim – Gold medal (Team eventing)
