= Laura Collett =

British equestrian (born 1989)

Laura Collett MBE
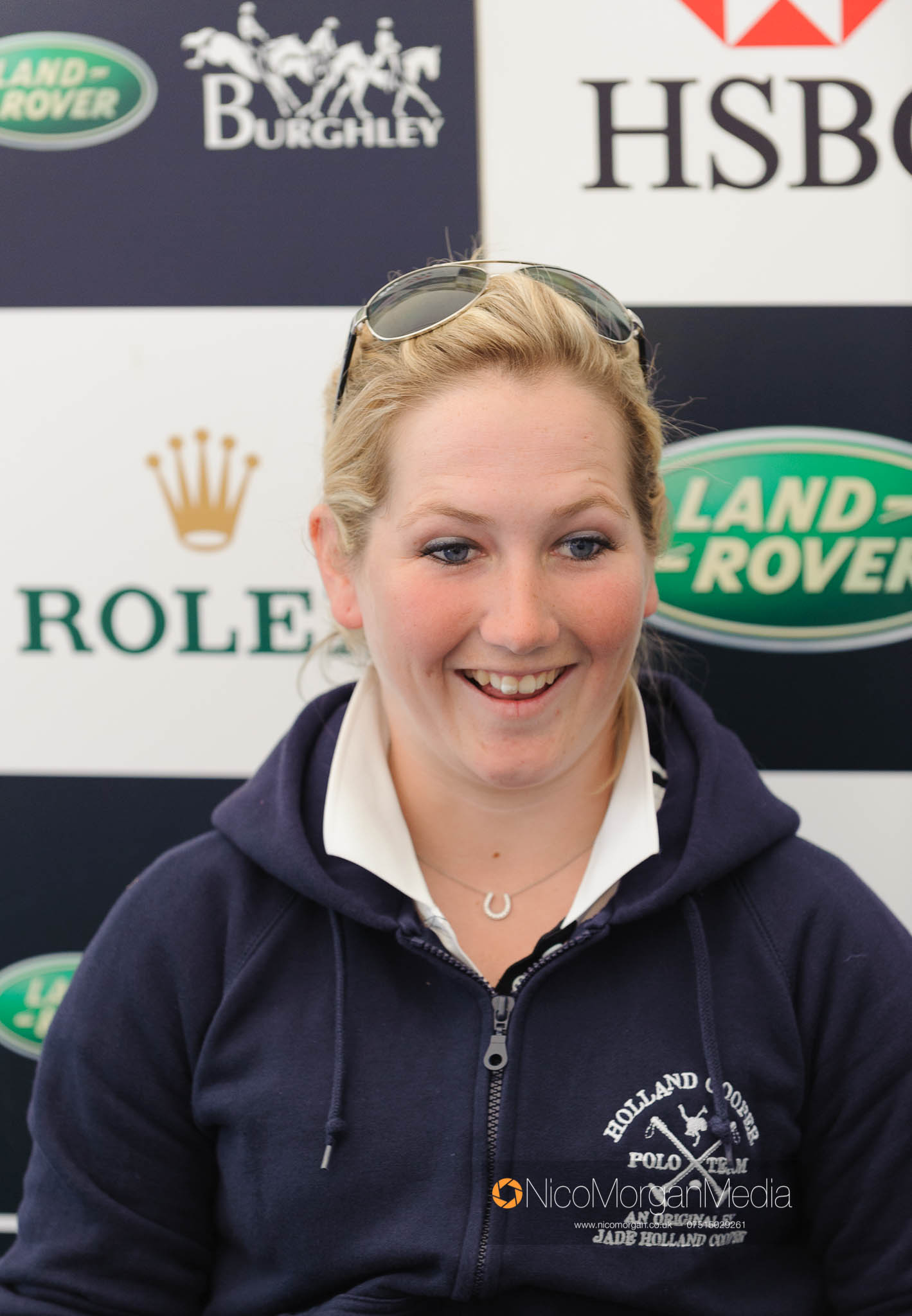
- Collett in 2010

Personal information
- Born: 31 August 1989 (age 37) Leamington Spa, England

Sport
- Country: United Kingdom
- Sport: Equestrian
- Event: Eventing
Medal record
Representing Great Britain
Olympic Games
Gold medal – first place	2020 Tokyo	Team eventing
Gold medal – first place	2024 Paris	Team eventing
Bronze medal – third place	2024 Paris	Individual eventing
World Championships
Gold medal – first place	2026 Aachen	Team eventing
Bronze medal – third place	2026 Aachen	Individual eventing
European Championships
Gold medal – first place	2023 Haras du Pin	Team eventing
Gold medal – first place	2025 Blenheim	Individual eventing

Laura Collett (born 31 August 1989) is a British equestrian who competes in eventing.

== Early life ==
Collett won the supreme pony title at Horse of the Year Show in 2003 when she was 13. She won nine medals during her youth career, including three individual golds, in the juniors in 2006 on Fernhill Sox, in the juniors in 2007 on Rayef, and the young riders in 2009 again on Rayef.

== Career ==
Collett has been selected for three European Eventing Championships as an individual. She was eliminated on the cross-country on her senior championship debut at Luhmühlen in 2011, but finished 13th at the 2015 championships at Blair Castle on Grand Manoeuvre. Collett was second at Luhmühlen five-star in 2018 on Mr Bass, but she achieved her first five-star win in October 2020 when she took the title at the Pau Horse Trials, France, riding her own, Keith Scott and Karen Bartlett's horse London 52 and therefore has the honour of winning the only five-star of 2020 because the eventing calendar that year had been decimated by COVID-19. The horse had previously been the 2018 eight- and nine-year-old champion at Blenheim Horse Trials, as well as winning the Event Rider Masters at Chatsworth Horse Trials and the CCI4*-L at the Boekelo Horse Trials, both in 2019. But he had also fallen at the 2019 European Eventing Championships in Luhmühlen having sat third after the dressage.

In 2021, eight years after her near-fatal accident, Collett and London 52 were selected to represent Britain at the 2020 Summer Olympics in Tokyo that had been delayed by the COVID-19 pandemic. She won gold in the team event with Oliver Townend and Tom McEwen.

Collett was appointed Member of the Order of the British Empire (MBE) in the 2022 New Year Honours for services to equestrianism.

In 2022, Collett won the Badminton Horse Trials. Riding London 52, she led from start to finish, setting an all time Badminton record finishing score of 21.4.

In June 2024, she was confirmed as part of the Great Britain team to compete at the 2024 Paris Olympics on London 52. She won gold in the team event with Rosalind Canter and Tom McEwen.

In August 2025, she was selected for the British team for the 2025 European Eventing Championships held in Blenheim on London 52, riding alongside McEwan and Yasmin Ingham from the 2024 Olympic squad as well as Bubby Upton and Caroline Harris. She won the individual gold medal on London 52 at the event, although the British team suffered from falls by Ingham and Upton in the cross country section.

== Personal life ==
Following a heavy fall from her horse in 2013, Collett had to be resuscitated five times and given an emergency tracheotomy by paramedics after suffering a fractured shoulder, broken ribs, a punctured lung, a lacerated liver and damage to her kidneys. Also, a fragment of her shoulder bone had detached and travelled to her right eye through her blood stream and damaged the optic nerve. She was placed in an induced coma for six days.

== International Championship results ==
Results
Year	Event	Horse	Placing	Notes
2005	European Pony Championships	Noble Springbok	1st place, gold medalist(s)	Team
2005	European Pony Championships	Noble Springbok	3rd place, bronze medalist(s)	Individual
2006	European Junior Championships	Fernhill Sox	2nd place, silver medalist(s)	Team
2006	European Junior Championships	Fernhill Sox	1st place, gold medalist(s)	Individual
2007	European Junior Championships	Rayef	1st place, gold medalist(s)	Team
2007	European Junior Championships	Rayef	1st place, gold medalist(s)	Individual
2008	World Cup Final	Fernhill Sox	13th	
2009	European Young Rider Championships	Rayef	1st place, gold medalist(s)	Team
2009	European Young Rider Championships	Rayef	1st place, gold medalist(s)	Individual
2010	European Young Rider Championships	Fernhill Cristal	1st place, gold medalist(s)	Team
2010	European Young Rider Championships	Fernhill Cristal	8th	Individual
2011	European Championships	Rayef	EL	Individual
2013	World Young Horse Championships	Obos Cooley	WD	CCI**
2014	World Young Horse Championships	Pamero 4	3rd place, bronze medalist(s)	CCI**
2014	World Young Horse Championships	Controe	WD	CCI**
2015	European Championships	Grand Manoeuvre	13th	Individual
2015	World Young Horse Championships	Mr Bass	1st place, gold medalist(s)	CCI**
2015	World Young Horse Championships	Cooley Again	16th	CCI**
2017	World Young Horse Championships	Sir Papillon	4th	CCI**
2019	European Championships	London 52	EL	Individual
2020	World Young Horse Championships	Moonlight Charmer	EL	CCI3*-L
2021	Olympic Games	London 52	1st place, gold medalist(s)	Team
2021	Olympic Games	London 52	9th	Individual
2022	World Championships	London 52	4th	Team
2022	World Championships	London 52	40th	Individual
EL = Eliminated; RET = Retired; WD = Withdrew

== CCI5* results ==
Results
Event	Kentucky (USA) late April	Badminton (UK) early May	Luhmühlen (Germany) June	Burghley (UK) early September	Pau (France) late October	Adelaide (Australia) early November	Maryland
2010				30th (Ginger May Killinghurst)			
2011		8th (Rayef)		40th (Noble Bestman)			
2012					RET (Noble Bestman)		
2013		49th (Noble Bestman)					
2014	Did Not Participate						
2015		28th (Grand Manoeuvre)					
2016		22nd (Grand Manoeuvre)					
2017	Did Not Participate						
2018	Did Not Participate						
2019		WD (Mr Bass)					
2020	Cancelled due to COVID-19	Cancelled due to COVID-19	Cancelled due to COVID-19	Cancelled due to COVID-19	(gold) (London 52) 16th (Mr Bass)	Cancelled due to COVID-19	
2021		Cancelled due to COVID-19		Cancelled due to COVID-19	RET (Dacapo)	Cancelled due to COVID-19	
2022		(gold) (London 52)					
2023			(gold) (London 52)				
2024							
2025		43rd (Bling)	3rd (London 52)	10th (Bling)			
2026		14th (Bling)					
EL = Eliminated; RET = Retired; WD = Withdrew

== Notable horses ==
- Fernhill Sox
  - 2006 European Junior Championships - team silver, individual gold
- Rayef
  - 2007 European Junior Championships - team & individual gold
  - 2009 European Young Rider Championships - team & individual gold
- Fernhill Cristal
  - 2010 European Young Rider Championships - team gold, individual 8th
- Mr Bass
  - 2015 World Young Horse champion
  - 2018 Luhmühlen 5* runner up
- London 52
  - 2018 Blenheim 4* 8&9 year old winner
  - 2020 Pau 5* winner
  - 2021 Olympic Games - team gold, individual 9th
  - 2022 Badminton 5* winner
  - Badminton 5* finishing score record holder (21.4)
