= Queen Elizabeth II High School =

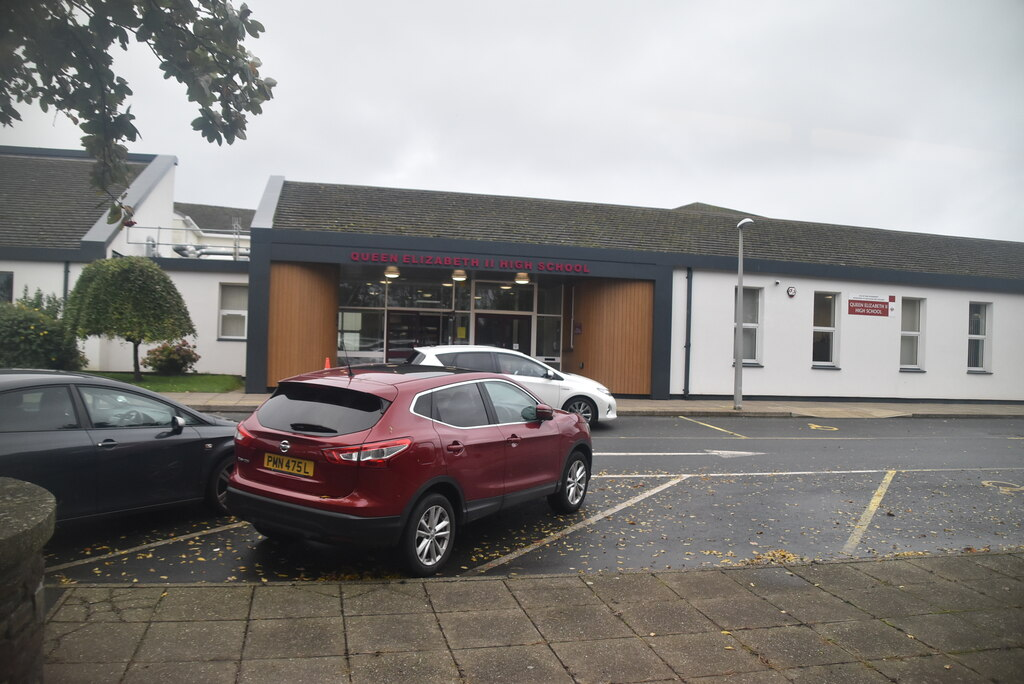
- Entrance in 2023

Location
- Douglas Road; Peel, IM5 1RD; Isle of Man
- 54.2173°N 4.6847°W

Information
- Other name: QE2
- Type: Comprehensive school
- Motto: Manx: Gleck dty share dy kinjagh (Always strive to do your utmost)
- Established: 5 July 1979; 47 years ago
- Local authority: Peel Town Commissioners
- Department for Education URN: 132494 Tables
- Head teacher: Charlotte Clarke
- Gender: Mixed
- Website: qe2.sch.im

Queen Elizabeth II High School (commonly referred to as simply QE2) is a mixed comprehensive school in Peel, Isle of Man.

The school teaches the years 7–11 as well as a sixth form for years 12–13. Queen Elizabeth II High School follows the Manx National Curriculum. Schools are not subject to Ofsted and Examination results are not published. The school population has grown to about 800 students and about 50 staff.

GCSE Manx is offered from the age of 12. One of the feeder schools is Bunscoill Ghaelgagh, a Manx language primary school in St John's. Manx medium instruction is offered to a small number of students for a limited number of Key Stage 3 subjects.

== Site ==
The school was opened on 5 July 1979 by Queen Elizabeth II, during her visit to the island to celebrate the millennium of Tynwald. During the time the school has been opened it has gone under extensive changes and has dramatically increased in size and with this, one new building was opened in 2000, the Forster building, which is home to the sixth form. In 2008 the Deans building was added, with an expansion proposed in 2014. This is home to the English Department on the upper floor, and the Music and performance area on the ground floor. This extension also provided the school with a much needed second dining room.

== Notable people ==
- Yasmin Ingham (born 1997), equestrian
- David Mullarkey (born 2000), runner
