= Bubby Upton =

British equestrian (born 1999)

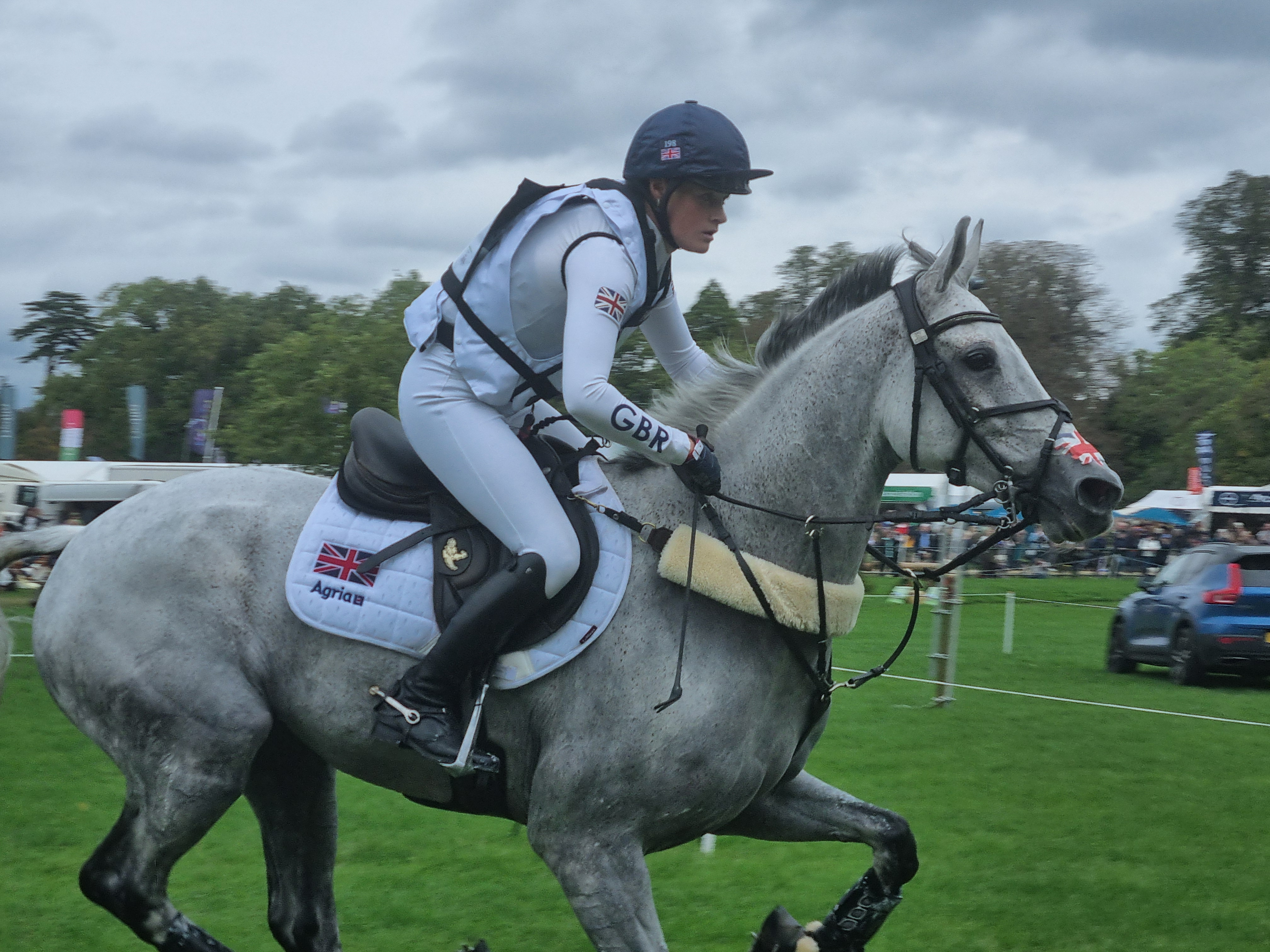
- 2025 European Eventing Championships

Personal information
- Full name: Isabelle Rose Upton
- Nationality: British
- Born: 25 January 1999 (age 27)
- Education: Edinburgh University

Sport
- Country: Great Britain
- Sport: Equestrian

Isabelle "Bubby" Upton (born 25 January 1999) is a British equestrian.

== Early life ==
She attended Stowe School in Buckinghamshire and graduated with a degree in sports management from the University of Edinburgh.

== Career ==
Upton made her debut on a British team at the 2014 pony European Championships, where she won team and individual silver on her pony Alfie. She contested two junior European Championships on Eros DHI, taking team bronze in 2016 and individual gold and team silver in 2017. Riding Cola III she won the national seven-year-old championships at Osberton in 2017, and placed second in the young rider national championships at Houghton in 2018 and 2019. She rode at the Young Rider Europeans in 2018 and 2019 on Cola III and came home with individual silver and team gold in 2019. She made her senior debut for Great Britain at the FEI Eventing Nations Cup in Houghton Hall in 2019 on her gelding Fernhill Rockstar.

Previously a winner of the British under-18, and under-21 titles, Bubby won the under-25 CCI4*-L title at Bicton Horse Trials on Cannavaro in 2021.

Upton broke her back in August 2021, but was back competing at five-star level by the October of that year. She finished 14th at Burghley Horse Trials in the autumn of 2022 and finished eighth at the Badminton Horse Trials on Cola III in May 2023.

She won the under-25 national title for a second time in June 2023 at the Bramham International Horse Trials and won the Britannia Trophy in 2023. However, in August 2023 she broke several vertebrae in her back after a fall in training. She returned from the injuries to compete again at Badminton in May 2024. In May 2024, she was one of the British nominated entries for the Paris 2024 Olympic Games.

In June 2025, Upton secured her first senior CCI4*-L win riding Its Cooley Time at the Bramham Horse Trials. In August 2025, she was selected with Its Cooley Time for the British team for the European Eventing Championships held in Blenheim, alongside Laura Collett, Caroline Harris and Yasmin Ingham amongst others, although she suffered a fall during the cross country at the event.

== Personal life ==
She is based near Newmarket, Suffolk.
