= Bicton Arena International 5* =

Equestrian eventing competition in 2021

Coordinates: 50°39′58″N 3°19′28″W

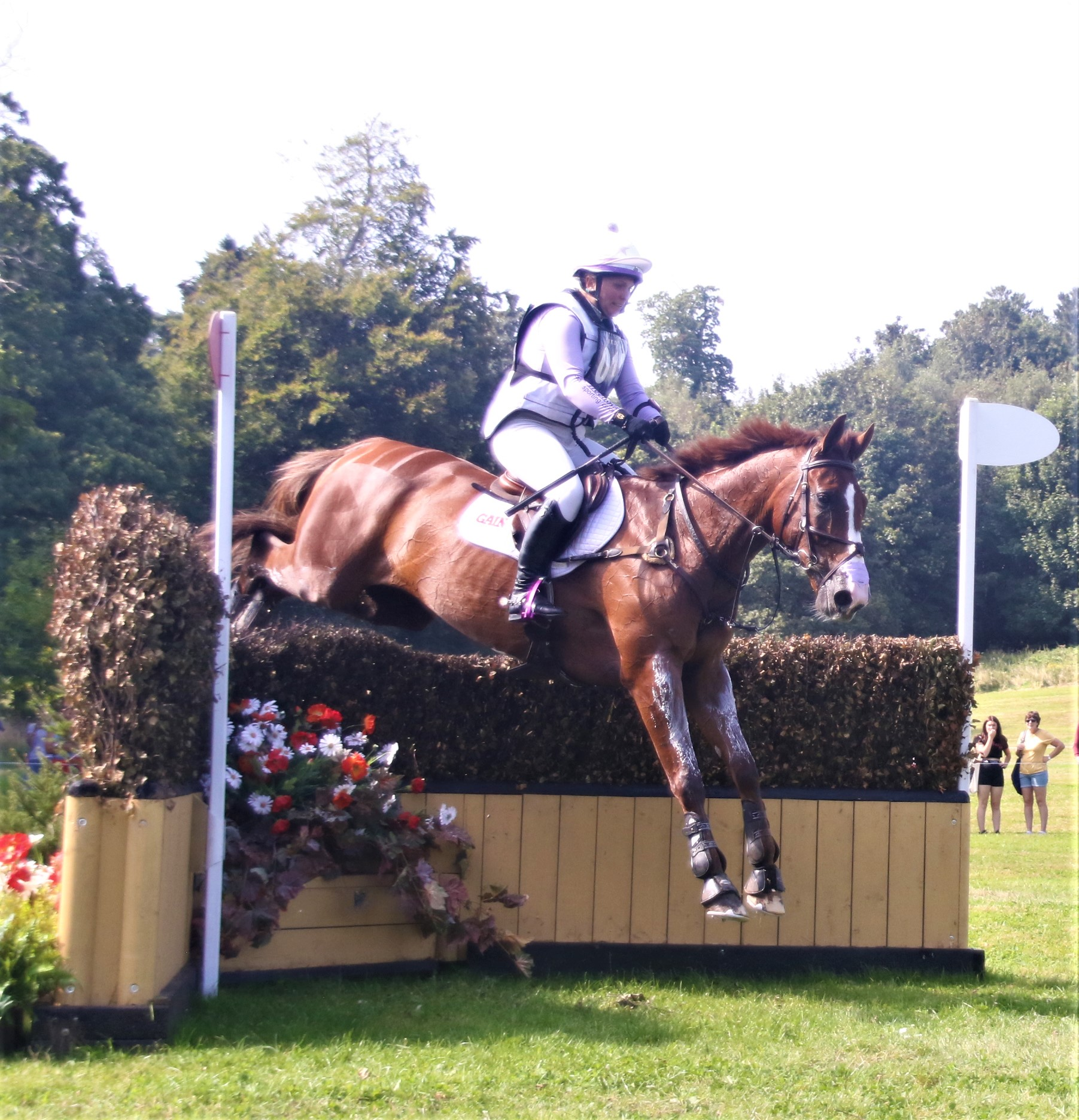
Gemma Tattersall riding Chilli Knight to victory at the event

The Bicton Arena International 5*, known for sponsorship reasons as the Chedington Bicton Park 5* Horse Trials was a Concours Complet International (CCI) 5* eventing competition held as a one-off replacement for the Burghley Horse Trials in 2021, following the cancellation of both UK 5* events in 2020 and 2021 due to the coronavirus pandemic. The event was won by Gemma Tattersall riding Chilli Knight.

== Location and design ==
The event was held at Bicton Arena, an established equestrian venue which already hosts a 4* competition, located on Clinton Devon Estates land at Bicton House, Devon, England.

The arena already hosts a CCI 4* event over very challenging undulating terrain, and the 5* course was designed by Captain Mark Phillips, a former Olympic gold medallist in eventing.

The cross-country course proved challenging with 12 riders retiring or being eliminated during the cross-country phase - over one third of all competitors.

Only two riders completed the cross-country phase clear inside the time allowed, with Oliver Townend also being inside the time, but with 11 jumping penalties.

== Participation ==
32 riders took part in the event, with 18 completing the event.

Countries represented were:

- (United Kingdom) Great Britain – Gemma Tattersall, Pippa Funnell, Piggy March, Rosalind Canter, Richard P Jones, Oliver Townend, Felicity Collins, Francis Whittington, Angus Smales, Louisa Lockwood, Harry Mutch, Will Rawlin, Izzy Taylor, William Fox-Pitt, Simon Grieve, Georgie Spence, David Doel, Richard Skelt, Michael Owen
- (Republic of Ireland) Ireland – Padraig McCarthy, Joseph Murphy, Sarah Dowley
- New Zealand – Tim Price, James Avery
- Australia – Sammi Birch, Sam Griffiths
- Canada – Michael Winter
- Sweden – Malin Josefsson

== Results ==
The results were:

Position	Rider	Horse	D	SJ	XC	Total	Notes
1	(United Kingdom) Gemma Tattersall	Chilli Knight	27.9	0.00	0.00	27.90	
2	(United Kingdom) Pippa Funnell	Billy Walk On	23.9	0.00	4.80	28.70	Second ride
3	(United Kingdom) Piggy March	Vanir Kamira	25.5	8.40	0.00	33.90	
4	(United Kingdom) Rosalind Canter	Pencos Crown Jewel	27.1	8.00	7.60	42.70	
5	(United Kingdom) Pippa Funnell	Majas Hope	27.4	4.00	15.20	46.60	First ride
6	(United Kingdom) Richard Jones	Alfies Clover	33	5.20	8.80	47.00	
D = Dressage, SJ = Showjumping, XC = Cross Country
