= Concours Complet International =

Competition rating for equestrian eventing

The Concours Complet International (CCI) is the competition rating for the equestrian sport of eventing, given by the international governing body for the sport, the FEI. The rating system was recently changed, effective 1 January 2019.

Originally, competitions were held in two formats, CCI and CIC (Concours International Combiné). The difference between the two was that the 4 phases of cross-country (A, B, C, and D) were held in CCI competition, while CIC (Concours International Combiné) competition only ran the D phase. With the advent of the new format (which abolished phases A, B, and C), the FEI agreed to change the distances of the CCI to make it more difficult than the CIC competitions. Thus, CIC competitions had fewer obstacles on a shorter course than CCI competitions.

As of 1 January 2019, CCI competitions have been renamed to CCI-L (Long) and CIC to CCI-S (Short). The term CIC is no longer officially in use.

== Starring system ==
All FEI-recognized competitions, regardless of discipline, are rated on a "star" system. In eventing, the 5* level is the highest and the 1* level is the lowest of the FEI-recognised divisions.

Additionally, there are many competitions held at levels below the one-star. These competitions are not FEI-recognized, and are usually held under the rules of a country's national governing body.

Prior to 2019, the 4* was the highest level. All existing competitions were moved up one star level, and a new 1* Introductory level instituted below the old 1* classification.

== Concours Complet International (Long) ==
CCI-L Competitions are held under FEI rules for Three Day Events, including the General Rules and Veterinary Regulations. They are international three-day events, as opposed to a national competition or a one- or two-day horse trial.

=== CCI5* ===
The CCI5* is highest level of eventing competition under the banner of the FEI. This competition is for horses with a good deal of experience and success in international competition. It includes the Olympics (although the Olympics are usually made easier, at more of a four-star level, to allow a greater number of nations to compete successfully), the FEI World Equestrian Games, and seven annual horse trials each year. As of 2024 these are:

- Adelaide Equestrian Festival (Australia)
- Badminton Horse Trials (UK)
- Burghley Horse Trials (UK)
- Kentucky Three-Day Event (US)
- Luhmühlen Horse Trials (Germany)
- Stars of Pau (France).
- Maryland 5 Star, at Fair Hill (US)

In 2021, following the cancellation of Burghley and Badminton due to the coronavirus pandemic, a one-off event, the Bicton Arena International 5* was held at Bicton Arena in Devon, England, UK.

Rules:

- Riders must be at least 18 years old, and horses 7 (although most are much older).
- Cross-country has maximum of 45 jumping efforts on a 6270-7410m course, ridden at 570 mpm (total course time of 11–13 minutes)
- Stadium has maximum of 16 efforts and 11-13 obstacles (Note: a combination is one obstacle), ridden at 375 mpm, with a course length of 500–600 meters.

=== CCI4*-L ===
Advanced level, for horses with some experience in international competition.

Rules:

- Riders must be at least 18 years old, and horses 7 (although most are much older).
- Cross-country has maximum of 40 jumping efforts on a 5700-6840m course, ridden at 570 mpm (total course time of 10–12 minutes)
- Stadium has maximum of 15 efforts and 11-12 obstacles, ridden at 375 mpm, with a course length of 450–550 meters.

=== CCI3*-L ===
Intermediate level, for horses and riders with some experience riding in a three-day event, who are just starting to begin international competition.

Rules:

- Riders must be at least 16 years of age, and horses at least 6 years old.
- Cross-country has maximum of 37 jumping efforts on a 4950-5500m course, ridden at 550 mpm (total course time of 9–10 minutes)
- Stadium has maximum of 14 efforts and 10-11 obstacles, ridden at 350 mpm, with a course length of 400–500 meters.

=== CCI2*-L ===
Preliminary (USA) or Novice (Britain) level, used as an introductory level to the three-day event.

Rules:

- Riders must be at least 14 years old, and horses at least 6 years of age.
- Cross-country has maximum of 32 jumping efforts on a 4160–4680m course, ridden at 520 mpm (total course time of 8–9 minutes)
- Stadium has maximum of 13 efforts and 10-11 obstacles, ridden at 350 mpm, with a course length of 350–450 meters.

== Concours Complet International (Short) ==
The CCI-S may be held over one day, and is thus considered an international one-day event. However, it must follow FEI rules. Additionally, the CCI-S is held only at the one to four-star levels. There are no 5* CCI-S competitions.

=== CCI4*-S ===
Cross-country is held over a 3200–4000 m course with 32-40 efforts, and ran at a speed of 570 mpm. Stadium has maximum of 15 efforts and 11-12 obstacles, ridden at 375 mpm, with a course length of 450–550 meters.

=== CCI3*-S ===
Cross-country is held over a 2800–3600 m course with 28-36 efforts, and ran at a speed of 550 mpm. Stadium has maximum of 14 efforts and 10-11 obstacles, ridden at 350 mpm, with a course length of 400–500 meters.

=== CCI2*-S ===
Cross-country is held over a 2400–3200 m course with 24-32 efforts, and ran at a speed of 520 mpm. Stadium has maximum of 13 efforts and 10-11 obstacles, ridden at 350 mpm, with a course length of 350–450 meters.

== Introductory level from 2019 onwards ==
The CCI1* introduced in 2019 has a stadium jumping height of 1.05m, can be organized as short or long format and is not compulsory for qualifications at the 2* level and above.

== Other terms ==
- CCN: National Three Day Event. They must be held under FEI rules for Three Day Events (but not FEI General Rules or Veterinary Regulations).
- CCIO: Official International Three Day Event, for team competitions internationally, such as the Olympic Games, the World Equestrian Games, the Pan-American Games, and the European Championships.
- CH: International Championship Three Day Event
- CCIP: International Three Day for Ponies. Only provided at the * and ** level.
- J/YR: divisions for young riders (21 or younger) and juniors (18 or younger).
