= Étoiles de Pau =

Horse event in France

The Étoiles de Pau or Stars of Pau is an annual three-day event held in Pau, in the South of France, near the Pyrénées mountains. It is one of only seven annual Concours Complet International (CCI) five-star events in the world (the highest level of competition) as classified by the Fédération Équestre Internationale (FEI) and the only one held in France. It takes place every year in October in the Domaine de Sers in Pau.

The six others CCI Five Stars are the Burghley Horse Trials and Badminton Horse Trials, held in Great Britain, the Kentucky Three-Day Event and the Maryland 5 Star held in the United States, the Australian International Three Day Event, held in Australia, and the Luhmühlen Horse Trials, held in Germany.

== Winners ==
Year	Rider	Horse	Notes
2007	(France) Nicolas Touzaint (FRA)	Hildago de l'Île	
2008	(Germany) Bettina Hoy (GER)	Ringwood Cockatoo	
2009	(Germany) Dirk Schrade (GER)	King Artus	
2010	(Germany) Andreas Dibowski (GER)	FRH Fantasia	
2011	(United Kingdom) William Fox-Pitt (GBR)	Oslo	
2012	(New Zealand) Andrew Nicholson (NZL)	Nereo	
2013	(United Kingdom) William Fox-Pitt (GBR)	Seacookie	
2014	(Germany) Ingrid Klimke (GER)	Horseware Hale Bob	
2015	(France) Astier Nicolas (FRA)	Piaf De B Neville	
2016	(France) Maxime Livio (FRA)	Qalao Des Mers	
2017	(France) Gwendolen Fer (FRA)	Romantic Love	
2018	(France) Thibault Fournier (FRA)	Siniani de Lathus	
2019	(United Kingdom) Tom McEwen (GBR)	Toledo de Kerser	
2020	(United Kingdom) Laura Collett (GBR)	London 52	
2021	(New Zealand) Tim Price (NZL)	Falco	
2022	(New Zealand) Jonelle Price (NZL)	Grappa Nera	
2023	(United Kingdom) Ros Canter (GBR)	Izilot DHI	

== Casualties and incidents ==
=== 2008 ===
- Tsunami II was euthanized after suffering a broken cervical vertebrae after falling at a fence during cross country. Her rider, Zara Phillips (GBR) broke her collarbone in the accident.

=== 2017 ===
- Crackerjack, ridden by Boyd Martin (USA) was euthanized after suffering multiple fractures to his right front pastern bone which incurred during the cross-country portion of the event.
