= Tom McEwen (equestrian) =

British equestrian (born 1991)

Tom McEwan MBE
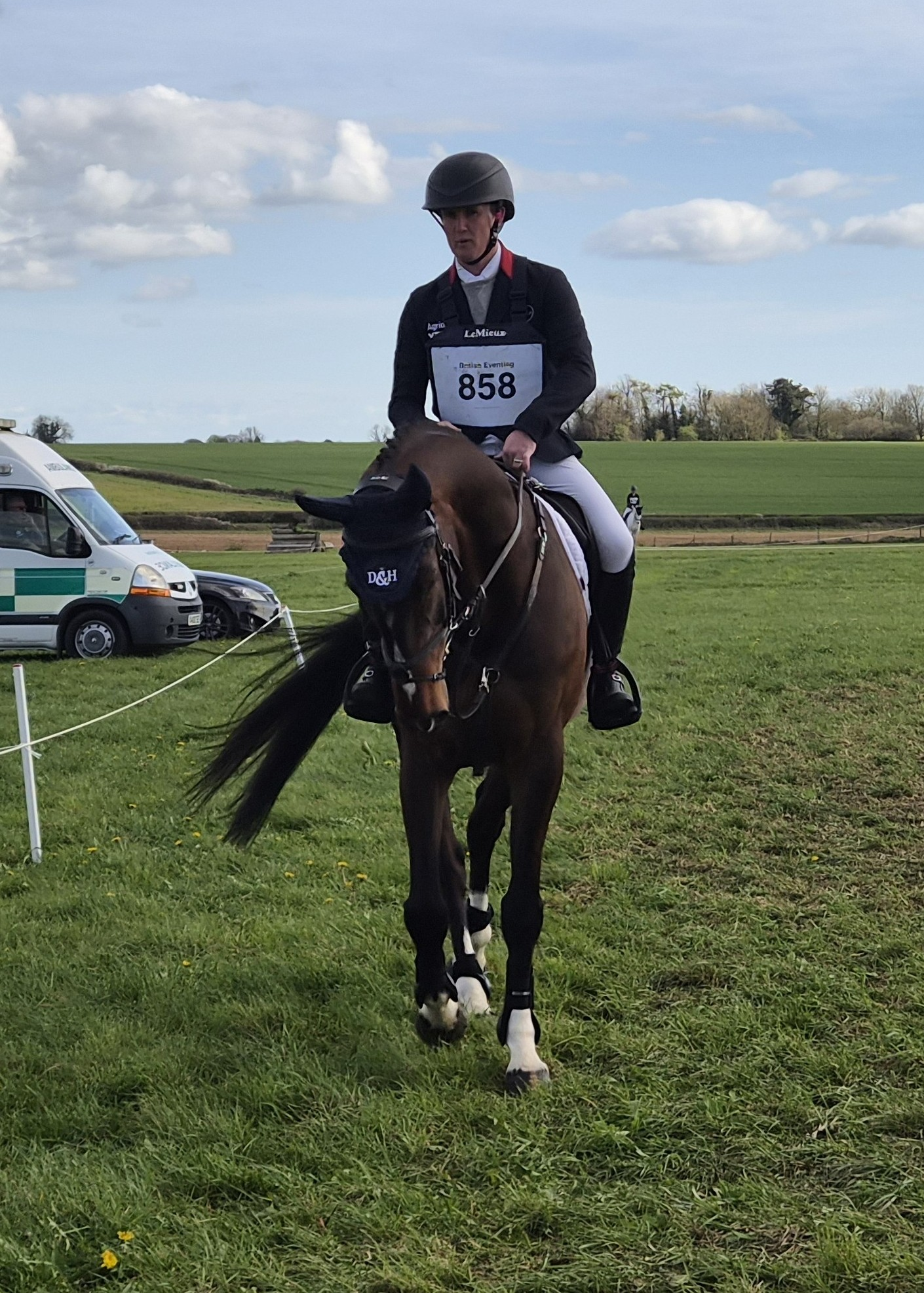
- McEwen at the 2026 Oxstalls BE100 Horse Trials

Personal information
- Born: 10 May 1991 (age 35) Swindon, England

Sport
- Sport: Equestrian
- Event: Eventing
Medal record
Equestrian
Representing Great Britain
Olympic Games
Gold medal – first place	2020 Tokyo	Team eventing
Gold medal – first place	2024 Paris	Team eventing
Silver medal – second place	2020 Tokyo	Individual eventing
World Championships
Gold medal – first place	2018 Tryon	Team eventing
Gold medal – first place	2026 Aachen	Team eventing
European Championships
Bronze medal – third place	2025 Blenheim	Individual eventing

Thomas Bruce McEwen (born 10 May 1991) is a British equestrian who competes in eventing.

== Career ==
McEwen was on the European young rider eventing team in 2010 and 2011. He won team gold in 2010 riding Major Sweep and then won another team gold in 2011 aboard Private Rudolph. He was a member of the gold medal-winning pony European eventing team in 2007 with his ride Dick Taytoe.

He competed at the 2018 World Equestrian Games upon Toledo de Kerser, finishing 12th individually and helping Team GBR win the team Gold. In 2019 he won the CCI***** event the Étoiles de Pau riding Toledo De Kerser.

McEwen and Toledo De Kerser were selected to represent Britain at the delayed 2020 Summer Olympics and won gold in the team event.

McEwen was presented with a Member of the Order of the British Empire (MBE) in the 2022 New Year Honours for services to equestrianism.

In June 2024, he was confirmed as part of the Great Britain team to compete at the 2024 Paris Olympics on JL Dublin. There he won gold in the team eventing final, alongside Ros Canter and Laura Collett.

In September 2025, riding JL Dublin, he won the individual bronze medal riding for the British team at the European Eventing Championships held in Blenheim.

== CCI5* Results ==
Results
Event	Kentucky (USA) late April	Badminton (UK) early May	Luhmühlen (Germany) June	Burghley (UK) early September	Pau (France) late October	Adelaide (Australia) mid April	Maryland (USA) early October
2011				19th (Dry Old Party)			
2012	Did not participate						
2013		19th (Dry Old Party)		EL (Dry Old Party)	11th (Dry Old Party)		
2014		31st (Diesel) RET (Dry Old Party)		RET (Dry Old Party)			
2015			WD (Diesel)				
2015	Did not participate						
2016					22nd (Toledo de Kerser)		
2017		11th (Toledo de Kerser)		4th (Toledo de Kerser)			
2018		7th (Toledo de Kerser) 27th (Strike Smartly)					
2019		11th (Toledo de Kerser)	(silver) (Figaro van het Broekxhof)		(gold) (Toledo de Kerser) 16th (Figaro van het Broekxhof)		
2020	Cancelled due to Covid-19	Cancelled due to Covid-19	Cancelled due to Covid-19	Cancelled due to Covid-19	5th (Toledo de Kerser)	Cancelled due to Covid-19	
2021		Cancelled due to Covid-19		Cancelled due to Covid-19	(silver) (CHF Cooliser)	Cancelled due to Covid-19	
2022		27th (CHF Cooliser) EL (Toledo de Kerser)	EL (Braveheart B) EL (Bob Chaplin)	12th (CHF Cooliser)	27th (Braveheart B) EL (Bob Chaplin)		
2023	(silver) (JL Dublin)	4th (Toledo de Kersee)		RET (Toledo de Kersee) WD (Luna Mist)			
EL = Eliminated; RET = Retired; WD = Withdrew
