= Bicton Arena =

Show jumping venue in England

Coordinates: 50°39′58″N 3°19′28″W

Bicton Arena is a multi-discipline equestrian venue in Devon, England. It is notable for hosting the Bicton Arena International 5*, the only CCI 5* event to run in the UK 2021, replacing the traditional Burghley Horse Trials normally held on the same weekend at Burghley House in Lincolnshire.

The venue is part of the grounds of Bicton House (now used as Bicton College, and is managed by Clinton Devon Estates who manage the estate of Baron Clinton, the largest private landowner in the county.
