= Caroline Harris (equestrian) =

British equestrian (born 1989)

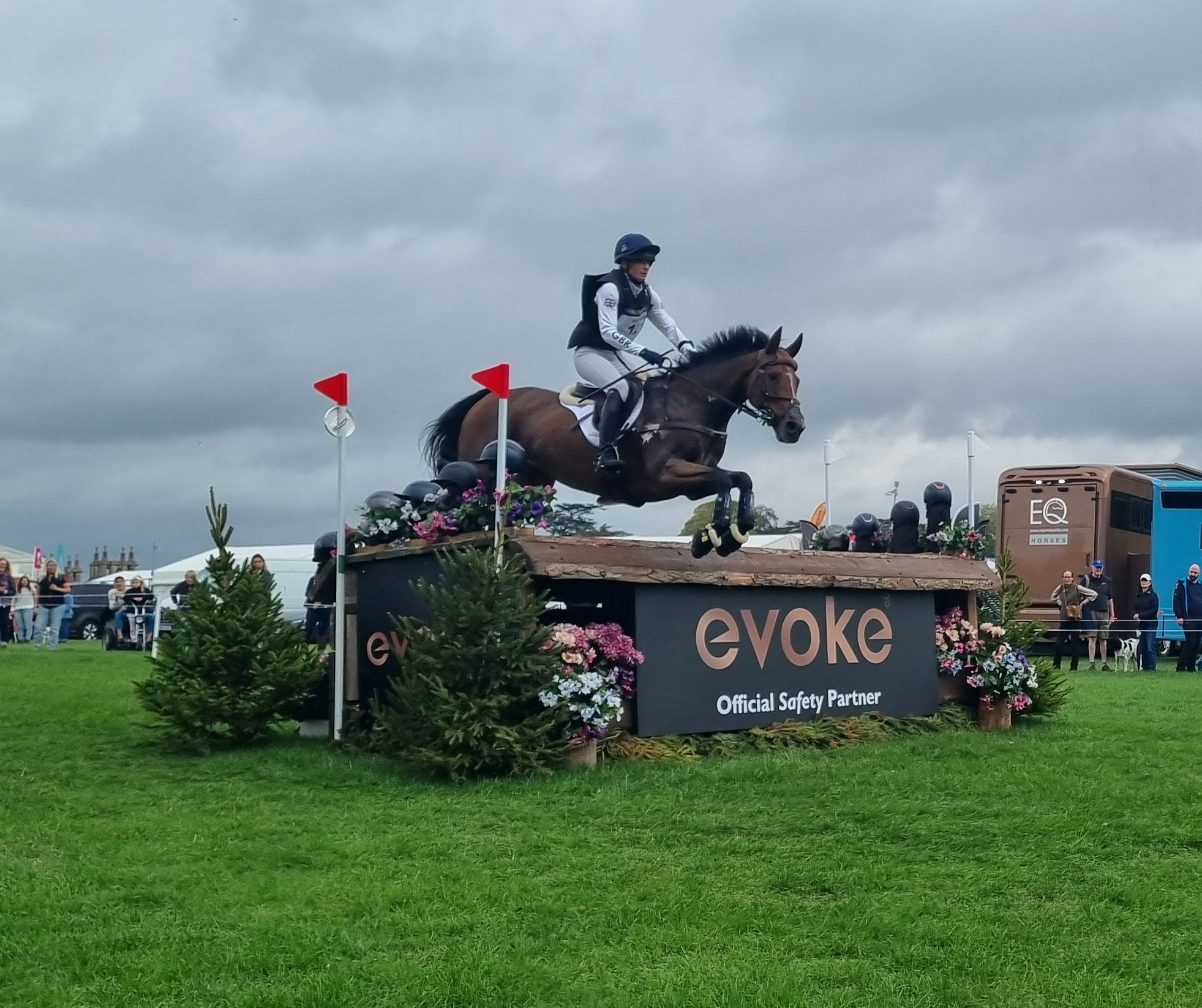
- 2025 European Eventing Championships

Personal information
- Nationality: British
- Born: 31 December 1989 (age 36)

Sport
- Country: Great Britain
- Sport: Equestrian

Caroline Harris (born 31 December 1989) is a British equestrian.

== Early life ==
Harris initially grew up in Wandsworth, London and began riding at about 5 years-old at the Ridgway Stables on Wimbledon Common and Richmond Park. Her family later moved to Somerset, where they could keep their own ponies, and she had her own pony from the age of ten years-old and joined the Blackmore Vale Pony Club. She has siblings Alexander and Katie and they attended Ashdown House School.

== Career ==
She made her international eventing debut in her late teens and was part of the World Class Equine Pathway Programme. She spent a decade based with Australian Olympian Sam Griffiths in Dorset, before later being based at Captain Mark Phillips' Aston Farm near Stroud, Gloucestershire.

Competing at the FEI Eventing Young Horses World Championship at Le Lion d'Angers, she had a fourth place finish with Cooley Mosstown in 2023. In wet conditions that year she came third at Chatsworth CCI-4*S on D.Day.

Riding D.Day she had a twelfth place on her five-star debut at Luhmühlen in June 2024 having been in the top-ten after the dressage. Later that year, the pairing won at Lignières CCI4*-S in wet conditions, had a third place finish at Blenheim Horse Trials. The pair secured their first five-star win in the wet at the CCI5*-L International 3-Day Event at de Pau in France in October 2024.

On D.Day she had a seventh place finish in Aachen representing Great Britain on D.Day at the 2025 CHIO Aachen World Equestrian Festival in July 2025. In August 2025, she was selected for the British team for the European Eventing Championships held in Blenheim, on D.Day.
