= Tilly's Pony Tails =

Series of children's books

Tilly's Pony Tails is a series of children's books, published by Orion Children's Books in the United Kingdom. The series was created by equestrian sportswoman Pippa Funnell.

== Series ==
The first two books in the series, Magic Spirit and Red Admiral, were first published in May 2009. The series has now been extended to eighteen titles in all. The first four titles have also been recorded as unabridged audiobooks, read by sports presenter Clare Balding.

=== Characters ===
The central character, Tilly Redbrow, is an adopted child, who is passionate about everything to do with horses and ponies. In the first book in the series, Magic Spirit, Tilly helps rescue a neglected horse called Magic Spirit. She discovers that she has a special gift for communicating with horses. When she helps Magic Spirit, Tilly meets Angela, who owns a stables called Silver Shoe Farm. Angela invites Tilly to spend time at Silver Shoe Farm, learning about riding, training and caring for horses. Tilly soon makes friends at the stables and spends all her free time there. Each title in the series tells a new story about Tilly's adventures with horses and ponies that she comes into contact with, as well as her continuing relationship with Magic Spirit. The series is also linked with a continuing story about Tilly's background and birth, the only clue to which is a bracelet made of horsehair. As well as the fictional story, each title also contains a tips section with expert advice from Pippa Funnell on all aspects of horses and ponies.

=== Author ===
Pippa Funnell, MBE, is a leading equestrian sportswoman in three-day eventing. In 2003 she became the first person and currently the only person to win eventing's greatest prize, the Rolex Grand Slam of eventing (consecutive wins at Kentucky, Badminton Horse Trials and Burghley Horse Trials). As part of the British team, she won a silver medal in the 2000 Sydney Olympics, a bronze medal at the 2002 World Equestrian Games and silver again at the 2004 Athens Olympics. Pippa Funnell is a trustee of the horse charity, World Horse Welfare, and the work of the charity features throughout the Tilly's Pony Tails books.

== Titles ==
=== Novels ===
- Magic Spirit ISBN 978-1-84255-709-9
- Red Admiral ISBN 978-1-84255-710-5
- Rosie ISBN 978-1-84255-711-2
- Samson ISBN 978-1-84255-712-9
- Lucky Chance ISBN 978-1-84255-713-6
- Solo ISBN 978-1-84255-714-3
- Pride and Joy ISBN 978-1-4440-0081-8
- Neptune ISBN 978-1-4440-0082-5
- Parkview Pickle ISBN 978-1-4440-0083-2
- Nimrod ISBN 978-1-4440-0090-0
- Moonshadow ISBN 978-1-4440-0091-7
- Autumn Glory ISBN 978-1-4440-0092-4
- Goliath ISBN 978-1-4440-0259-1
- Buttons ISBN 978-1-4440-0260-7
- Rusty ISBN 978-1-4440-0261-4
- Royal Flame ISBN 978-1-4440-0262-1

=== Audiobooks ===
(read by Clare Balding)

- Magic Spirit ISBN 978-1-4091-1185-6
- Red Admiral ISBN 978-1-4091-1187-0
- Rosie ISBN 978-1-4091-2307-1
- Samson ISBN 978-1-4091-2309-5

=== Special editions ===
- Tilly's Horse box ISBN 978-1-4440-0130-3
- Tilly's Pony Tails 1-3 ISBN 978-1-4440-0227-0
