= Supreme Rock =

Irish Sport Horse (1988–2013)

- Breed: Irish Sport Horse
- Sire: Edmund Burke (Thoroughbred)
- Grandsire: Advocator (Thoroughbred)
- Dam: Rineen Classic (Irish Draught Sport Horse)
- Maternal grandsire: Bassompierre (Thoroughbred)
- Sex: Gelding
- Foaled: 1988
- Died: April 2013 (aged 25)
- Country: UK
- Colour: Bay
- Breeder: Lindy Nixon-Gray Ireland

Supreme Rock was an Irish Sport Horse, bred by Lindy Nixon-Gray Ireland and ridden by Pippa Funnell in four event competitions for Great Britain. He was put down in early April 2013 aged 25. He was a 16.3 hands (67 inches, 170 cm) bay gelding. He was retired in 2005 at the Badminton Horse Trials. He is remembered primarily for his role in Funnell's completion of the Grand Slam of Eventing, winning the Badminton Horse Trials, the Rolex Kentucky Three Day and The Land Rover Burghley Horse Trials. He is also the only horse ever to have won two European Championship titles back-to-back – Luhmühlen (Germany) in 1999, and Pau (France) in 2001 – as well as being one of a select group of horses to have won Badminton Horse Trials twice in 2002 and 2003. The high point of his career with Funnell was winning team Silver at the 2000 Olympics in Sydney.

== Pedigree ==
Pedigree of Supreme Rock
Sire Edmund Burke Thoroughbred 1973	Advocator; Thoroughbred; 1963	Round Table; 1954	Princequillo – 1940
Sire Edmund Burke Thoroughbred 1973	Advocator; Thoroughbred; 1963	Round Table; 1954	Knights Daughter – 1941
Sire Edmund Burke Thoroughbred 1973	Advocator; Thoroughbred; 1963	Delta Queen; 1946	Bull Lea – 1935
Sire Edmund Burke Thoroughbred 1973	Advocator; Thoroughbred; 1963	Delta Queen; 1946	Bleebok – 1941
Sire Edmund Burke Thoroughbred 1973	Section; Thoroughbred; 1965	*Ambiorix; 1946	Tourbillon – 1928
Sire Edmund Burke Thoroughbred 1973	Section; Thoroughbred; 1965	*Ambiorix; 1946	Lavendula – 1930
Sire Edmund Burke Thoroughbred 1973	Section; Thoroughbred; 1965	Zonah; 1958	Nasrullah – 1940
Sire Edmund Burke Thoroughbred 1973	Section; Thoroughbred; 1965	Zonah; 1958	Gambetta – 1952
Dam Rineen Classic Irish Draught Sport Horse 1984	Bassompierre; Thoroughbred; 1968	Khalkis; 1960	Vimy – 1952
Dam Rineen Classic Irish Draught Sport Horse 1984	Bassompierre; Thoroughbred; 1968	Khalkis; 1960	Merry Xmas – 1951
Dam Rineen Classic Irish Draught Sport Horse 1984	Bassompierre; Thoroughbred; 1968	La Bonne; 1961	Worden – 1949
Dam Rineen Classic Irish Draught Sport Horse 1984	Bassompierre; Thoroughbred; 1968	La Bonne; 1961	La Bastille – 1957
Dam Rineen Classic Irish Draught Sport Horse 1984	Golden Brief; Irish Draught Sport Horse; 1974	Awkward Brief; 1957	Petition – 1944
Dam Rineen Classic Irish Draught Sport Horse 1984	Golden Brief; Irish Draught Sport Horse; 1974	Awkward Brief; 1957	Rocky Serenade
Dam Rineen Classic Irish Draught Sport Horse 1984	Golden Brief; Irish Draught Sport Horse; 1974	Bodecia; 1964	Ireland
Dam Rineen Classic Irish Draught Sport Horse 1984	Golden Brief; Irish Draught Sport Horse; 1974	Bodecia; 1964	Ireland

Supreme Rock
Medal record

Equestrian

Olympic Games
Silver medal – second place	2000 Sydney	Team Eventing

World Championships
Bronze medal – third place	2002 Jerez de la Frontera	Team Eventing

European Championships
Gold medal – first place	1999 Luhmühlen	Individual Eventing
Gold medal – first place	1999 Luhmühlen	Team Eventing
Gold medal – first place	2001 Pau	Individual Eventing
Gold medal – first place	2001 Pau	Team Eventing
