= Happy talk (disambiguation) =

Happy talk is commentary interspersed between news items.

Happy talk may also refer to:

- Happy Talk (horse), a horse ridden by Bruce Davidson
- "Happy Talk" (song), a 1949 popular song from South Pacific, and a UK number one single for Captain Sensible
- Happy Talk, a 2013 novel by Richard Melo
- Happy Talk (album)
