= Tamie Smith =

American eventing rider

Personal information
- Full name: Tamra Smith
- Discipline: Eventing
- Born: July 23, 1974 (age 51)
- Home town: Murrieta, California, U.S.
- Horse: Mai Baum

Website
- nextleveleventing.com
Medal record
Equestrian
Representing United States
World Championships
Silver medal – second place	2022 Pratoni	Team eventing
Pan American Games
Gold medal – first place	2019 Lima	Team eventing

Tamra "Tamie" Smith (born July 23, 1974) is an American eventing rider. She won the Kentucky Three-Day Event CCI5*‑L in 2023 on Mai Baum, the first U.S. winner since 2008 and the first female winner since 2011. She was a member of the U.S. team that won team gold at the 2019 Pan American Games in Lima and helped the United States win team silver at the 2022 FEI World Eventing Championships in Pratoni del Vivaro, where she finished 9th individually.

== Career ==
Smith is based in Temecula, California, where she operates Next Level Eventing. She turned professional in 2005 and rose to prominence with Mai Baum, taking The Dutta Corp/USEF Eventing National Championship at Fair Hill in 2015 and multiple FEI wins that season.

In 2021, Smith and Mai Baum placed in the top 10 on the horse’s five‑star debut at Kentucky and were named the traveling reserve combination for the Tokyo 2020 Olympic Games. In 2022 the pair finished 9th at the Badminton Horse Trials and led the U.S. to world team silver at Pratoni.

Smith’s 2023 Kentucky victory ended a 15‑year U.S. drought at the event and capped a season that also included individual bronze in the SAP Cup CCIO4*‑S at CHIO Aachen. In 2024, she withdrew Mai Baum from consideration for the Paris Olympic team after the horse sustained a setback; the pair did not pursue selection. Mai Baum made a farewell appearance in 2025 at Rebecca Farm.

== Major results ==
Selected international highlights

- 2023: Winner, Kentucky Three-Day Event CCI5*‑L – Mai Baum.
- 2023: 3rd, CCIO4*‑S SAP Cup, CHIO Aachen – Mai Baum.
- 2022: Team silver, World Eventing Championships (Pratoni del Vivaro); 9th individual – Mai Baum.
- 2022: 9th, Badminton Horse Trials CCI5*‑L – Mai Baum.
- 2019: Team gold, Pan American Games (Lima) – Mai Baum.

== Horses ==
- Mai Baum (2006 black German Sport Horse gelding, Loredano 2–Ramira): 2015 Dutta Corp./USEF CCI3* National Champion (Fair Hill); 2019 Pan Am team gold; 2022 World team silver (9th indiv.); 2023 Kentucky CCI5*‑L winner; 2023 Aachen CCIO4*‑S 3rd.
- Other notable mounts include Danito, Solaguayre California, Envogue and Elliot‑V, with whom Smith won the 2020 USEF CCI3*‑L National Championship at Galway Downs.

== Personal life ==
Smith runs Next Level Eventing in Temecula, California, and is an ICP Level 4 certified instructor. She is married to Dave Smith and is the mother of eventing rider Kaylawna Smith‑Cook.

== Recognition ==
Smith and Mai Baum were named The Chronicle of the Horse’s “Eventing Horse and Person of the Year.”
