= Grand Slam of Eventing =

Three particular world horse trials competitions

The Grand Slam of Eventing, sponsored by Rolex, consists of three of the top CCI5*-L (previously CCI4*, due to a rating change effective January 1, 2019. Note that the nature of the competitions remains the same regardless of the change in name) equestrian eventing competitions in the world. Pippa Funnell in 2003 and Michael Jung in 2016, are the only riders to have achieved the Grand Slam since its inception in 1999. To win the Grand Slam, a rider must consecutively win all three events, although they are permitted to ride different horses in each competition. This is especially important, since the Badminton Horse Trials is only one week after Kentucky, and the horse would not have sufficient time to recover between the two competitions, especially since they would have to be flown overseas in that time.

The three events that make up the Grand Slam are:

- Defender Kentucky Three-Day Event in Lexington, Kentucky, United States
- MARS Badminton Horse Trials in Gloucestershire, England
- Defender Burghley Horse Trials near Stamford, Lincolnshire, England

Winners receive an extra $350,000, in addition to their winnings from each event.

== Past winners ==
The Grand Slam of Eventing began in 1999, and has since only been won by two riders.

Pippa Funnell (GBR):

- 2003 Kentucky Three Day (now the Defender Kentucky Three Day) on Primmore's Pride
- 2003 Badminton Horse Trials on Supreme Rock
- 2003 Burghley Horse Trials on Primmore's Pride

Michael Jung (GER):

- 2015 Burghley Horse Trials on La Biosthetique-Sam FBW
- 2016 Kentucky Three Day (now the Defender Kentucky Three Day) on FischerRocana FST
- 2016 Badminton Horse Trials on La Biosthetique-Sam FBW

== Other notable performances ==
Andrew Hoy (AUS):

- 2006 Kentucky Three Day on Master Monarch
- 2006 Badminton Horse Trials on Moonfleet
- 2006 2nd Burghley Horse Trials on Moonfleet (in the lead until the final phase)

Oliver Townend (GBR):

- 2009 Badminton Horse Trials on Flint Curtis
- 2009 Burghley Horse Trials on Carousel Quest
- 2010 Kentucky Horse Trials on Ashdale Cruise Master and ODT Master Rose, (in 9th and 6th after dressage but fell cross country while riding Ashdale Cruise Master and had to be airlifted to hospital)

William Fox-Pitt (GBR):

- 2011 Burghley Horse Trials on Parklane Hawk
- 2012 Kentucky Three Day on Parklane Hawk
- 2013 5th Badminton Horse Trials on Parklane Hawk (William had to wait until 2013 to complete his Grand Slam challenge due to the cancellation of Badminton in 2012)

Andrew Nicholson (NZL):

- 2012 Burghley Horse Trials on Avebury
- 2013 Kentucky Three Day on Quimbo
- 2013 3rd Badminton Horse Trials on Nereo

== Career wins ==
- Pippa Funnell (GBR) - Badminton (2002, 2003, 2005), Rolex Kentucky (2003), Burghley (2003,2019)
- Andrew Hoy (AUS) - Burghley (1979, 2004), Rolex Kentucky (2006), Badminton (2006)
- Lucinda Fredericks (AUS) - Burghley (2006), Badminton (2007), Rolex Kentucky (2009)
- William Fox-Pitt (GBR) - Burghley (1994, 2002, 2005, 2007–08, 2011), Badminton (2004, 2015), Rolex Kentucky (2010, 2012, 2014)
- Mary King (GBR) - Badminton (1992, 2000), Burghley (1996, pre Grand Slam), Rolex Kentucky (2011)
- Michael Jung (GER) - Rolex Kentucky (2015, 2016), Burghley (2015), Badminton (2016)
- Oliver Townend (GBR) - Badminton (2009), Burghley (2009, 2017), Rolex Kentucky (2018, 2019, 2021)

Pre 1999:

- Bruce Davidson (USA) won Burghley (1974), Badminton (1995) and six times at Kentucky (1978, 1983–84, 1988–89, 1993), prior to the latter event becoming a four-star event in 1998 and the Grand Slam being established in 1999.

== Rolex ==
Having picked up the Grand Slam concept, which was originally launched by the three events acting in concert, the company have since established themselves as a leading sponsor within Three Day Eventing. Furthermore, they were title sponsors of the Rolex Kentucky Horse Trials until they abandoned eventing title sponsorship across the globe and dropped the sponsorship. The Rolex Kentucky Horse Trials is now the Land Rover Kentucky Three Day Event, since Land Rover picked up the sponsorship. Rolex was the title sponsor of the event from 1981 to 2017. Rolex remains the official timepiece of the event.
