= The Gray Goose =

Horse ridden by eventer Kim Walnes

- Breed: Irish Draught Sport Horse
- Sire: Hill Tarquin (Thoroughbred)
- Grandsire: Hill Gail (Thoroughbred)
- Sex: Gelding
- Foaled: 1970, County Clare, Ireland
- Died: June 17, 2000
- Colour: Gray

Major wins
- 1982 Rolex Kentucky Three-Day Event

The Gray Goose was a horse ridden by American eventer Kim Walnes. At one point, the pair was ranked third in the world.

Kim Walnes first met The Gray Goose at a local riding stable in Ireland, when he was a three-year-old. They were separated for two years, during which time the horse was started under saddle, and fox hunted, where he fell and injured his knees. As a five-year-old, Kim began riding him, and she bought him a year later and returned with him to the United States.

It was not until their first event in the spring 1976, during the cross-country phase, that Gray grew to enjoy his time out riding.

Although Kim Walnes and her mount never had regular lessons, they managed to work up the levels. In 1979, they finished Intermediate level cross-country at the Lexington course (slightly modified from the 1978 World Championships) as the only pair to make the time. Due to their performance record, Walnes and Gray were invited to train with the United States Equestrian Team, and compete with the team in Europe the following year.

The pair came second at the 1981 Advanced competition at the Rolex Kentucky Three Day as well, only .2 penalties higher than the 3-time Olympic medalist James Wofford. They won the following year in 1982, after a clear cross-country and show jumping ride. A fall and knee injury at the Badminton Horse Trials in 1983 made his 1984 Rolex comeback remarkable. The combination also competed at Rolex 1985, finishing 3rd.

The finish at Rolex also won them a spot on the World Championship Team headed to Luhmuhlen, where they won the individual and team bronze at the World Championships.

The Gray Goose is also known as the equine star Sylvester Stallone, in the movie Sylvester, where he and Walnes doubled in the movie for the eventing shots. The movie included scenes from the pair's 1984 Rolex Three Day cross-country round.

A car accident prevented Walnes from riding Gray for a year. When she began again, she found that arthritis had begun to develop in his spine, and it was too uncomfortable for him to carry a rider. He was then retired and allowed to roam the boarding facility free.

The Gray Goose died June 17, 2000, at the age of thirty. He was cremated and his ashes were buried at the Kentucky Horse Park during a ceremony at the Rolex Kentucky Three Day in 2001.
