= Pippa Funnell =

British equestrian

Pippa Funnell MBE
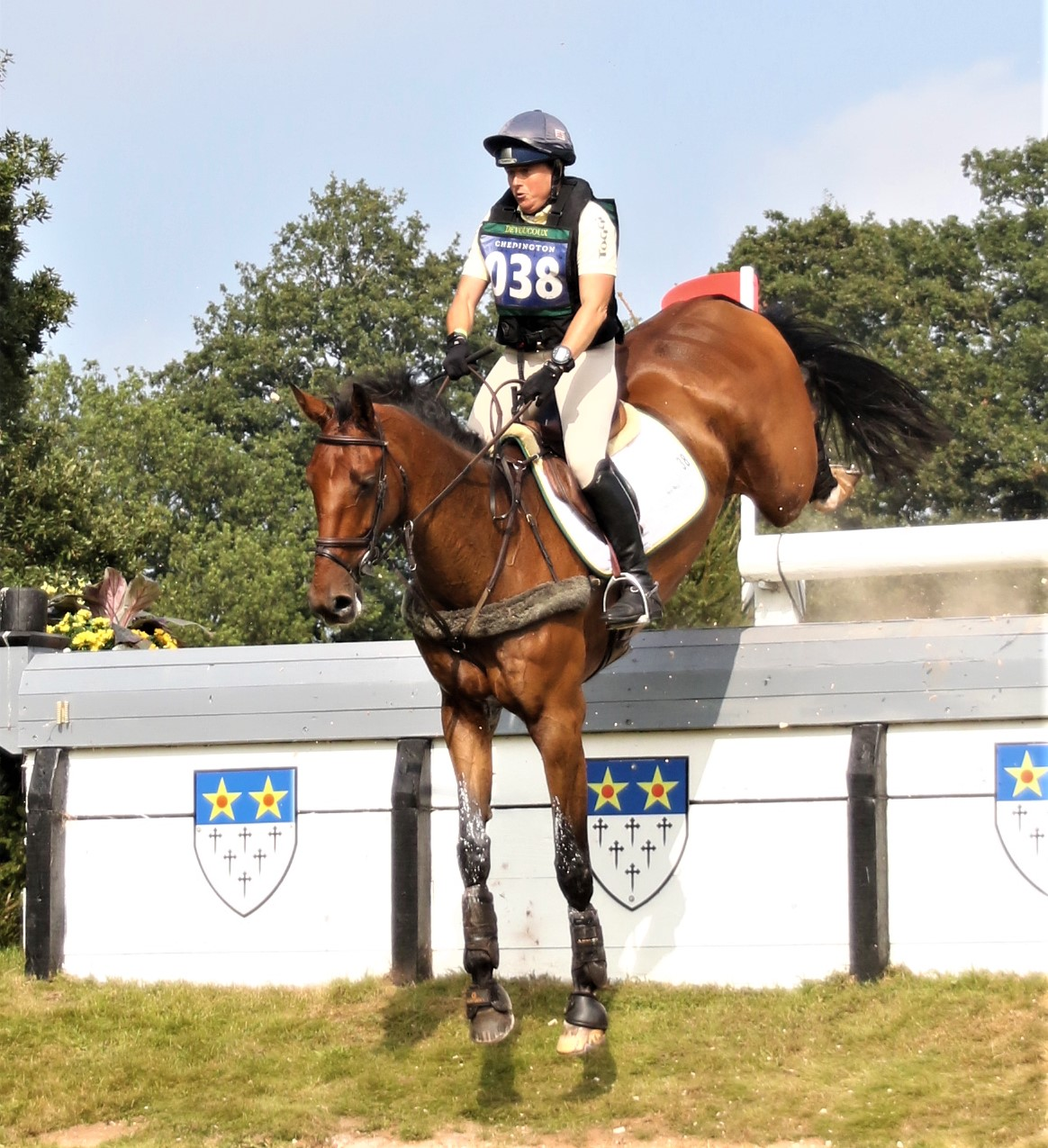
- Funnell on Billy Walk On at Bicton CCI 5* 2021

Personal information
- Full name: Philippa Rachel Funnell
- Nationality: Great Britain
- Discipline: Eventing
- Born: 7 October 1968 (age 57); Crowborough, East Sussex
Medal record
Representing Great Britain
Equestrian
Olympic Games
| Silver medal – second place | 2000 Sydney | Team Eventing |
| Silver medal – second place | 2004 Athens | Team Eventing |
| Bronze medal – third place | 2004 Athens | Individual Eventing |
World Championships
| Bronze medal – third place | 2002 Jerez | Team eventing |
European Championships
| Gold medal – first place | 1999 Luhmuhlen | Individual eventing |
| Gold medal – first place | 1999 Luhmuhlen | Team eventing |
| Gold medal – first place | 2001 Pau | Individual eventing |
| Gold medal – first place | 2001 Pau | Team eventing |
| Gold medal – first place | 2003 Punchestown | Team eventing |
| Silver medal – second place | 2015 Blair Castle | Team eventing |
| Silver medal – second place | 2019 Luhmühlen | Team eventing |
| Bronze medal – third place | 2003 Punchestown | Individual eventing |

Philippa Rachel Funnell MBE (née Nolan; born 7 October 1968) is an equestrian sportswoman who competes in eventing. In 2003, she became the first person to win the Rolex Grand Slam of Eventing (consecutive wins at Rolex Kentucky, Badminton and Burghley). She also won Badminton in 2002 and 2005. At the European Championships, she has won two Individual golds (1999–2001) and three team golds (1999–2003). She is a three-time Olympic medallist, winning team silver in 2000 and 2004, and an individual bronze in 2004. She also competed at the 2016 Summer Olympics.

== Early and personal life ==
Pippa Funnell was born in Crowborough, East Sussex on 7 October 1968 to Jenny and George Nolan. She grew up in Mark Cross and went to the Mark Cross CE primary school. She attended the independent boarding school Wadhurst College on Mayfield Lane in Wadhurst. Aged 16, she persuaded her parents to allow her to leave school, after which she based herself with Ruth McMullen.

Funnell married her husband, show jumper William Funnell in December 1993. They live in Ockley in Surrey where they have a stud farm to breed horses. They became the first husband and wife to be inducted into The British Horse Society Equestrian Hall of Fame when William was inducted in 2014. Pippa had been inducted in 2005.

== Career ==
Her horses have included Supreme Rock, Primmore's Pride, Sir Barnaby, Bits and Pieces, Walk on Star, and Ensign.

Funnell was European Young Rider Champion in 1987 after successfully competing on Sir Barnaby at Bialy Bor, Poland. Despite a successful career as a junior and young rider, she at first struggled to establish herself as a senior international and by her own admission suffered from nerves that were threatening to ruin her career. She began receiving help from sports psychologist Nicky Heath.

In 1999, Funnell became European Champion at Luhmühlen riding Supreme Rock and again on the same horse in 2001 at Pau ("Les Etoiles de Pau" – France). She was a member of the British teams that won silver at the Sydney Olympics in 2000, bronze at the World Equestrian Games in 2002 both with Supreme Rock, and silver again at the Athens Olympics of 2004, this time with Primmore`s Pride. In addition, Funnell won the individual bronze medal at Athens. (She competed at the Athens Olympics as 'Philippa' rather than 'Pippa' as 'Pipa' in Greek is slang for a sexual act.)

In 2003, Funnell became the first rider ever to complete the Rolex Grand Slam of Eventing, by adding the Burghley title to her victories earlier in the year at Kentucky and Badminton, to earn a $250,000 bonus from Rolex. The Kentucky and Burghley victories were on Primmore's Pride, while the Badminton victory was on Supreme Rock. As of 2017, she remains one of only two riders to have won the Grand Slam. As a result of her achievements, she was voted Sunday Times Sportswoman of the Year 2003 and was in the top five of the BBC Sports Personality of the Year Awards. She then went to Punchestown in Ireland to defend the individual European title that she had won in 1999 and 2001, winning a bronze medal with the inexperienced Walk On Star and helping the British team to win their fifth successive team title. She also finished the year as the number one ranked rider in the world.

In total Funnell has won the Badminton Horse Trials three times: 2002, 2003 and 2005. She has won both the Blenheim venue and Windsor Horse Trials four times as well, the only rider yet to do so. With Funnell as rider, Primmore's Pride became the 1st horse to win all three major four star titles - Kentucky & Burghley in 2003 and Badminton in 2005 - thus becoming the 1st horse to win its own Grand Slam.

After winning Badminton in 2005, Funnell did not win an international event for five years. Several of her top horses, such as Supreme Rock, Primmore’s Pride, Viceroy, Walk on Star, Cornerman and Jurassic Rising reached the end of their careers and were retired. With Ensign, she finished ninth at the 2005 Europeans. The combination were placed on the shortlist for the 2008 Olympics following a 2nd place at Pau CCI**** in late 2007. A fall at Badminton in 2008 put paid to them being picked.

In 2010, Funnell won her first international event for five years in the CCI3* at Bramham International horse trials on her upcoming horse Redesigned. They went on to finish 5th as an individual at the 2010 World Equestrian Games. In 2011, she won Barbary CIC3* on Billy Llandretti. In 2013, she won Tattersalls CCI3* with another upcoming horse, Billy Beware, who finished 6th at his first 4* event at Badminton Horse Trials 2014. This pairing were picked for the 2014 World Equestrian Games but injury unfortunately ruled them out. In May 2015, she won her third Chatsworth CIC 3* title aboard Sandman7. On 13 September 2015, Funnell won her 1st European team medal in 12 years helping GB win Team Silver at Blair Castle aboard Sandman 7. Since 2010, her horses have included Redesigned, Billy Beware, Billy the Biz, Billy Llandretti, Mirage D`Elle, Billy Cuckoo and Sandman7.

At the Rio 2016 Summer Olympics, riding Billy the Biz, Funnell was part of the British team that finished fifth. Her individual placement was 26th.

Funnell won the 2019 Burghley Horse Trials, riding MGH Grafton Street, having led from day one.

== CCI 5* Results ==
Results
| Event | Kentucky | Badminton | Luhmühlen | Burghley | Pau | Adelaide | Bicton |
|---|---|---|---|---|---|---|---|
| 1997 | | 9th (Bits and Pieces) | | | | | |
| 1998-2001 | Did not participate | | | | | | |
| 2002 | | (gold) (Supreme Rock) | | 6th (Primmore's Pride) | | | |
| 2003 | (gold) (Primmore's Pride) | (gold) (Supreme Rock) 6th (Cornerman) | | (gold) (Primmore's Pride) | | | |
| 2004 | | RET (Viceroy II) RET (Cornerman) | | RET (Cornerman) | | | |
| 2005 | | (gold) (Primmore's Pride) | | | | | |
| 2006 | | EL (Ensign) | | | | | |
| 2007 | | | | | (bronze) (Ensign) | | |
| 2008 | | RET (Ensign) | | | RET (Ensign) | | |
| 2009 | Did not participate | | | | | | |
| 2010 | | | | 15th (Mirage D'Elle) | | | |
| 2011 | | WD (Redesigned) WD (Mirage D'Elle) | 27th (Mirage D'Elle) | 28th (Mirage D'Elle) 30th (Pure Addiction) | | | |
| 2012 | Did not participate | | | | | | |
| 2013 | | 56th (Redesigned) | | 16th (Redesigned) | | | |
| 2014 | | 6th (Billy Beware) EL (Redesigned) | | | RET (Mirage D'Elle) EL (Redesigned) | | |
| 2015 | | 12th (Redesigned) 23rd (Second Supreme) | | WD (Redesigned) WD (Second Supreme) | | | |
| 2016 | | | | EL (Second Supreme) | | | |
| 2017 | | | 10th (Billy The Biz) | | | | |
| 2018 | | RET (Billy Beware) | RET (Billy Beware) | 13th (Majas Hope) | | | |
| 2019 | | 16th (Majas Hope) RET (Billy Walk On) | | (gold) (MGH Grafton Street) WD (Billy Walk On) | | | |
| 2021 | | | | | | | (silver) Billy Walk On 5th (Majas Hope) |
| 2022 | 6th (Maybach) 14th (Majas Hope) | RET (Billy Walk On) EL (MGH Grafton Street) | | 8th (Billy Walk On) 16th (Majas Hope) | | | |
| 2023 | | 10th (Majas Hope) RET (Billy Walk On) | | 6th (Majas Hope) | | | |
EL = Eliminated; RET = Retired; WD = Withdrew

== International Championship results ==
Results
| Year | Event | Horse | Placing | Notes |
|---|---|---|---|---|
| 1987 | European Young Rider Championships | Sir Barnaby | 1st place, gold medalist(s) | Individual |
| 1997 | European Championships | Bits and Pieces | 33rd | Individual |
| 1999 | European Championships | Supreme Rock | 1st place, gold medalist(s) | Team |
| 1999 | European Championships | Supreme Rock | 1st place, gold medalist(s) | Individual |
| 2000 | Olympic Games | Supreme Rock | 2nd place, silver medalist(s) | Team |
| 2001 | European Championships | Supreme Rock | 1st place, gold medalist(s) | Team |
| 2001 | European Championships | Supreme Rock | 1st place, gold medalist(s) | Individual |
| 2002 | World Equestrian Games | Supreme Rock | 3rd place, bronze medalist(s) | Team |
| 2002 | World Equestrian Games | Supreme Rock | 13th | Individual |
| 2003 | European Championships | Walk On Star | 1st place, gold medalist(s) | Team |
| 2003 | European Championships | Walk On Star | 3rd place, bronze medalist(s) | Individual |
| 2004 | Olympic Games | Primmore's Pride | 2nd place, silver medalist(s) | Team |
| 2004 | Olympic Games | Primmore's Pride | 3rd place, bronze medalist(s) | Individual |
| 2005 | European Championships | Ensign | 9th | Individual |
| 2006 | World Young Horse Championships | Matter of Opinion | 28th | CCI** |
| 2008 | World Young Horse Championships | Billy Landretti | 2nd place, silver medalist(s) | CCI* |
| 2008 | World Young Horse Championships | Redesigned | 3rd place, bronze medalist(s) | CCI** |
| 2008 | Eventing World Cup Final | Ensign | 2nd place, silver medalist(s) | |
| 2009 | World Young Horse Championships | Billy Landretti | 4th | CCI** |
| 2010 | World Young Horse Championships | Billy Shannon | 5th | CCI** |
| 2010 | World Equestrian Games | Redesigned | 5th | Individual |
| 2013 | European Championships | Mirage D'Elle | 6th | Team |
| 2013 | European Championships | Mirage D'Elle | 40th | Individual |
| 2015 | European Championships | Sandman 7 | 2nd place, silver medalist(s) | Team |
| 2015 | European Championships | Sandman 7 | 8th | Individual |
| 2016 | World Young Horse Championships | Billy Walk On | 2nd place, silver medalist(s) | CCI** |
| 2016 | Olympic Games | Billy The Biz | 5th | Team |
| 2016 | Olympic Games | Billy The Biz | 26th | Individual |
| 2019 | European Championships | Majas Hope | 2nd place, silver medalist(s) | Team |
| 2019 | European Championships | Majas Hope | 22nd | Individual |
EL = Eliminated; RET = Retired; WD = Withdrew

== Notable horses ==
- Sir Barnaby
- Supreme Rock
- Walk On Star
- Primmores Pride
- Ensign
- Sandman 7
- MGH Grafton Street
- Majas Hope
- Billy Walk On

== Honours ==
Funnell was made an MBE in the Queen's 2005 Birthday Honours for services to equestrian sport.

== Media activities and writing ==
Funnell has appeared on DVDs produced by Equestrian Vision, including Pippa Funnell, Road to the Top and The Funnell Factor, and in 2005 wrote her story in Pippa Funnell: The Autobiography.

Ubisoft has released a series of horse-themed videogames starring Funnell. These include Pippa Funnell for the Nintendo DS and Game Boy Advance, Pippa Funnell: Stable Adventure for the Game Boy Advance, and the PC games Pippa Funnell: The Stud Farm Inheritance, Pippa Funnell: Take the Reins (also for PlayStation 2), Pippa Funnell 3: The Golden Stirrups Challenge (more commonly known as Horsez), and Pippa Funnell 4: Secrets of the Ranch. Pippa Funnell: Ranch Rescue was released in 2007 on the PlayStation 2 and Nintendo Wii.

Funnell is also the author of a series of children's books called Tilly's Pony Tails, published by Orion Children’s Books in the United Kingdom. The first two books in the series, Magic Spirit and Red Admiral were first published in May 2009. The series has now been extended to eighteen titles in all. The first four titles have also been recorded as unabridged audiobooks, read by sports presenter Clare Balding. The central character, Tilly Redbrow, is an adopted child, who is passionate about everything to do with horses and ponies. Each title in the series tells a new story about Tilly’s adventures with horses and ponies. As well as the fictional story, each title also contains a tips section with expert advice from Funnell on all aspects of horses and ponies.

=== Books ===
1. Magic Spirit: the dream horse (2009) ISBN 9781842557099
2. Red Admiral: the racehorse (2009) ISBN 9781842557105
3. Rosie: the perfect pony (2009) ISBN 9781842557112
4. Samson: the stallion (2009) ISBN 9781842557129
5. Lucky Chance: the new foal (2009) ISBN 9781842557136
6. Solo: the super star (2010) ISBN 9781842557143
7. Pride and Joy: the event horse (2010) ISBN 9781444000818
8. Neptune: the heroic horse (2010) ISBN 9781444000825
9. Parkview Pickle: the naughty show pony (2010) ISBN 9781444000832
10. Nimrod: the circus pony (2010) ISBN 9781444000900
11. Moonshadow: the Derby winner (2011) ISBN 9781444000917
12. Autumn Glory: the new horse (2011) ISBN 9781444000924
13. Goliath: the rescue horse (2011) ISBN 9781444002591
14. Buttons: the naughty pony (2011) ISBN 9781444002607
15. Rusty: the trustworthy pony (2011) ISBN 9781444002614
16. Royal Flame: the police horse (2011) ISBN 9781444002621
17. Stripy: the zebra foal (2012) ISBN 9781444002638
18. Free Spirit: the mustang (2012) ISBN 9781444002645

=== Audiobooks, read by Clare Balding ===
1. Magic Spirit (2010) ISBN 9781409111856
2. Red Admiral (2010) ISBN 9781409111870
3. Rosie (2010) ISBN 9781409123071
4. Samson (2010) ISBN 9781409123095

=== Special editions ===
- Tilly's Horse box (2010) ISBN 9781444001303
- Tilly's Pony Tails 1–3 (2010) ISBN 9781444002270
- Tilly's Pony Tails Annual 2011 (2010) ISBN 9781444001112

=== Other books ===
- Pippa Funnell: The Autobiography (2005) ISBN 9780752865195
- Ask Pippa (Questions and Answers) (2010) ISBN 9781444002652
