= Mike Tucker (equestrian) =

British equestrian rider and commentator

Michael Edward George Tucker (30 November 1944 – 28 March 2018) was a British equestrian rider, who was better known more as Britain's main equestrian (eventing) commentator.

== Career ==
He competed in eventing.

He was on the board of British Eventing from 1999 to 2005. He worked with the International Federation for Equestrian Sports (FEI). He designed horse eventing courses. In April 2017 Tucker announced that he was retiring from commentating bowing out at the 2017 Badminton Horse Trials.

== Personal life ==
He lived in Cotswold District at Long Newnton. He was a beef farmer, with Wagyu cattle. He was married to Angela. He took part in the Duke of Beaufort's Hunt.

He died suddenly on 28 March 2018 at the age of 73.

== See also ==
- Category:Equestrian sports in the United Kingdom
- British Equestrian Federation
