= Primmore's Pride =

Thoroughbred eventing horse

- Breed: 7/8 Thoroughbred
- Discipline: Eventing
- Sire: Mayhill
- Dam: Primmore Hill
- Maternal grandsire: Ben Faerie
- Sex: Gelding
- Foaled: 1993
- Died: 20 March 2023
- Country: United Kingdom
- Colour: Bay
- Breeder: Roger and Joanna Day
- Owner: Denise and Roger Lincoln
- Trainer: Pippa Funnell
- Rider: Pippa Funnell

Major wins
- Won Rolex Kentucky Three Day Event, Badminton Horse Trials, and Burghley Horse Trials

Primmore's Pride was a 7/8 Thoroughbred gelding. Known as "Kiri", he was foaled in 1993, bred by Roger & Joanna Day, the offspring of Mayhill (sire) and Primmore Hill (dam). He was owned by Denise & Roger Lincoln and ridden by Pippa Funnell, who achieved the Grand Slam of eventing in 2003 by winning the Rolex Kentucky Three Day, Badminton Horse Trials, and Burghley Horse Trials while riding Primmore's Pride.

Primmore's Pride was retired after a ligament injury after winning Badminton in 2005. Primmore's Pride was euthanized 20 March 2023 at the age of 30.

== Eventing results ==
- 1st Burghley Young Event Horse Final as a 5-year-old
- 1st Le Lion d'Anger 7 year old World Championship
- 4th Blenheim CCI*** 2001
- 2nd Punchestown CCI*** 2002
- 6th Burghley 2002
- 2nd British Open Championships Gatcombe and National Champion 2002
- 1st Rolex Kentucky 2003
- 1st Burghley 2003
- Team Silver Athens Olympics 2004
- Individual Bronze Athens Olympics 2004
- 1st Badminton 2005
