= Burghley Horse Trials =

Annual event in England

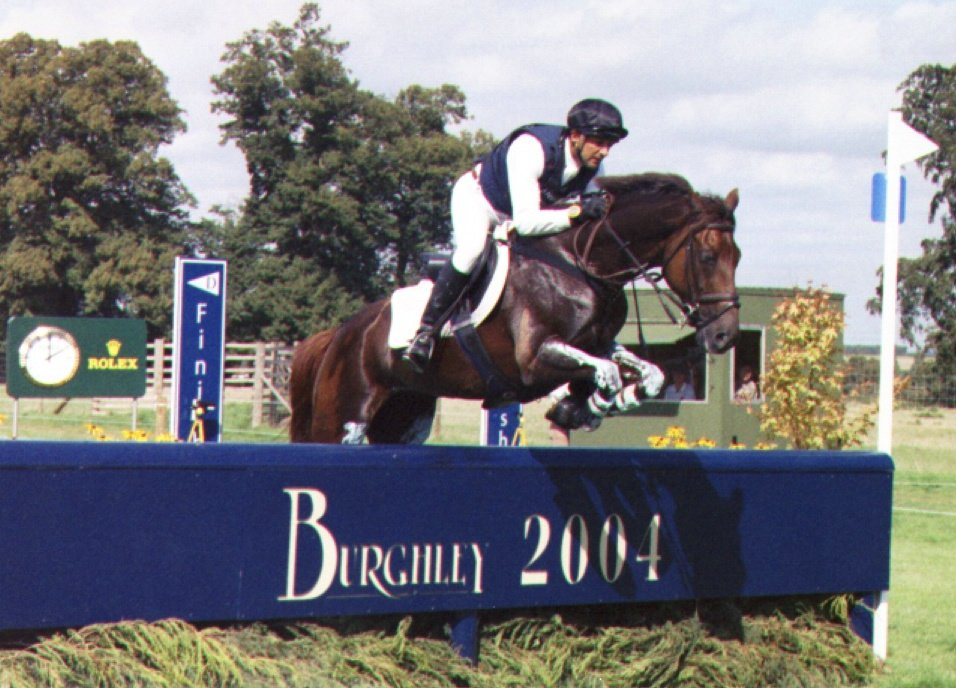
A competitor in the 2004 Horse Trials

The Burghley Horse Trials is an annual three-day event held at Burghley House near Stamford, Lincolnshire, England, currently in early September. Defender Burghley Horse Trials is classified by the FEI as one of the seven leading three-day events in the world (the others being the Badminton Horse Trials, the Kentucky Three-Day Event, the Australian International Three Day Event, the Luhmühlen Horse Trials, the Maryland 5* and the Étoiles de Pau). It has competition at CCI5*-L (five star) level. The prize for first place is currently £115,000. Depending on the number of starters, prize money is given down to 16th place.

Burghley is also one of the three events in the Grand Slam of Eventing.

Run in conjunction with the event since 1990 is the Dubarry Burghley Young Event Horse final, which judges four- and five-year-old horses on their potential as future Olympic mounts.

== History ==
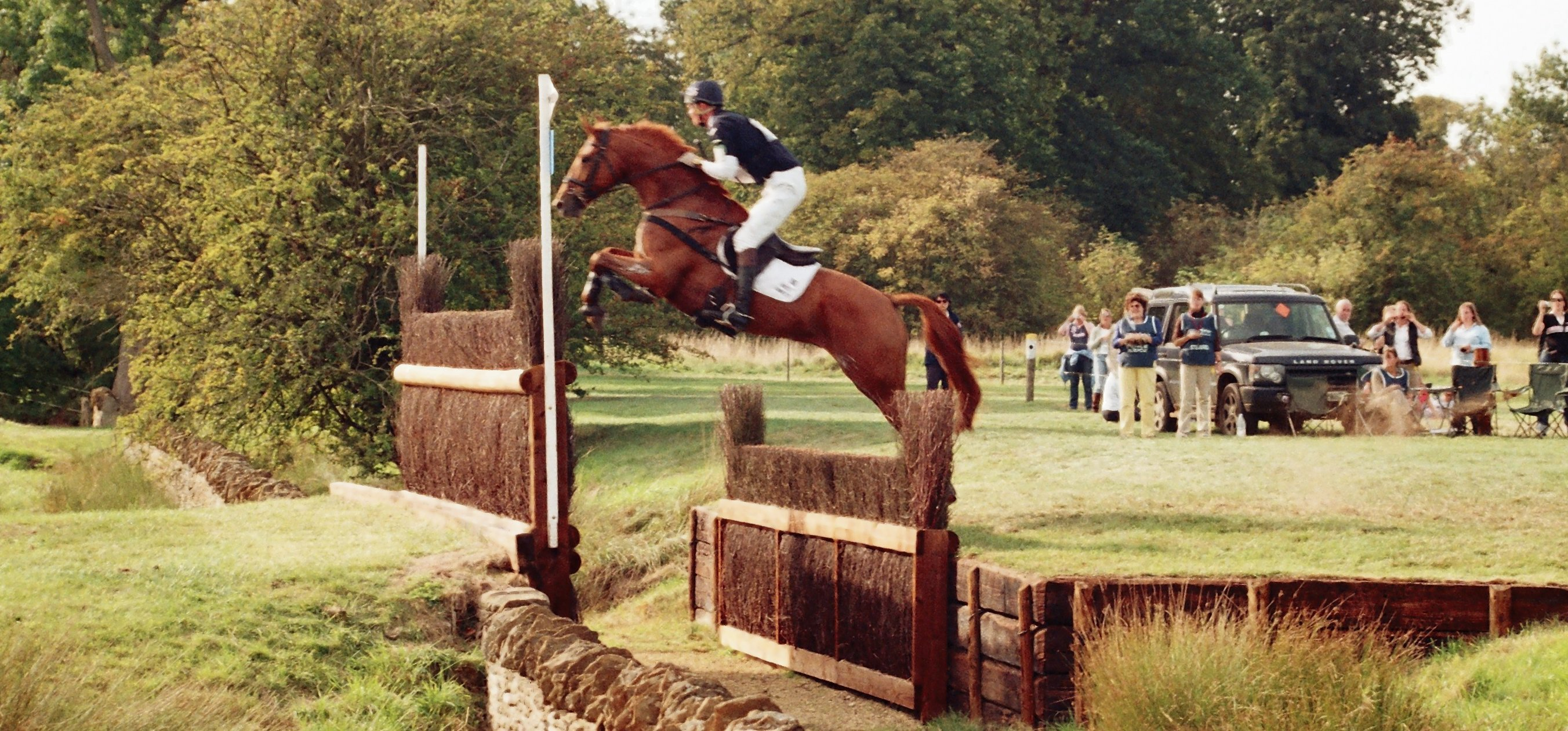
William Fox-Pitt, here clearing the Cottesmore Leap on Idalgo in 2006, has the most wins at Burghley, with six.

Horse trials have been held at Burghley House since 1961, when its owner, the 6th Marquess of Exeter, an Olympic gold medalist in athletics and IOC member, heard that a three-day event at Harewood House could no longer be held due to suspected foot and mouth disease. Since then, no other international horse trials site has staged as many championships, a record ten in all, including the first World Championship in 1966.

It is the longest continuously running international event. Up to 2023, there have been seven course designers: Bill Thomson, M.R.C.V.S. 1961 – 1983, Lt-Col. Henry Nicoll, D.S.O., O.B.E., 1975, Philip Herbert 1984 – 1988, Captain Mark Phillips, C.V.O., 1989 – 1996 and 1998 – 2000, Mike Tucker 1997 and 2001, Wolfgang Feld 2002 – 2004, Capt. Mark Phillips, C.V.O., 2005 – 2019 and Derek di Grazia, 2022–present.

== Winners ==
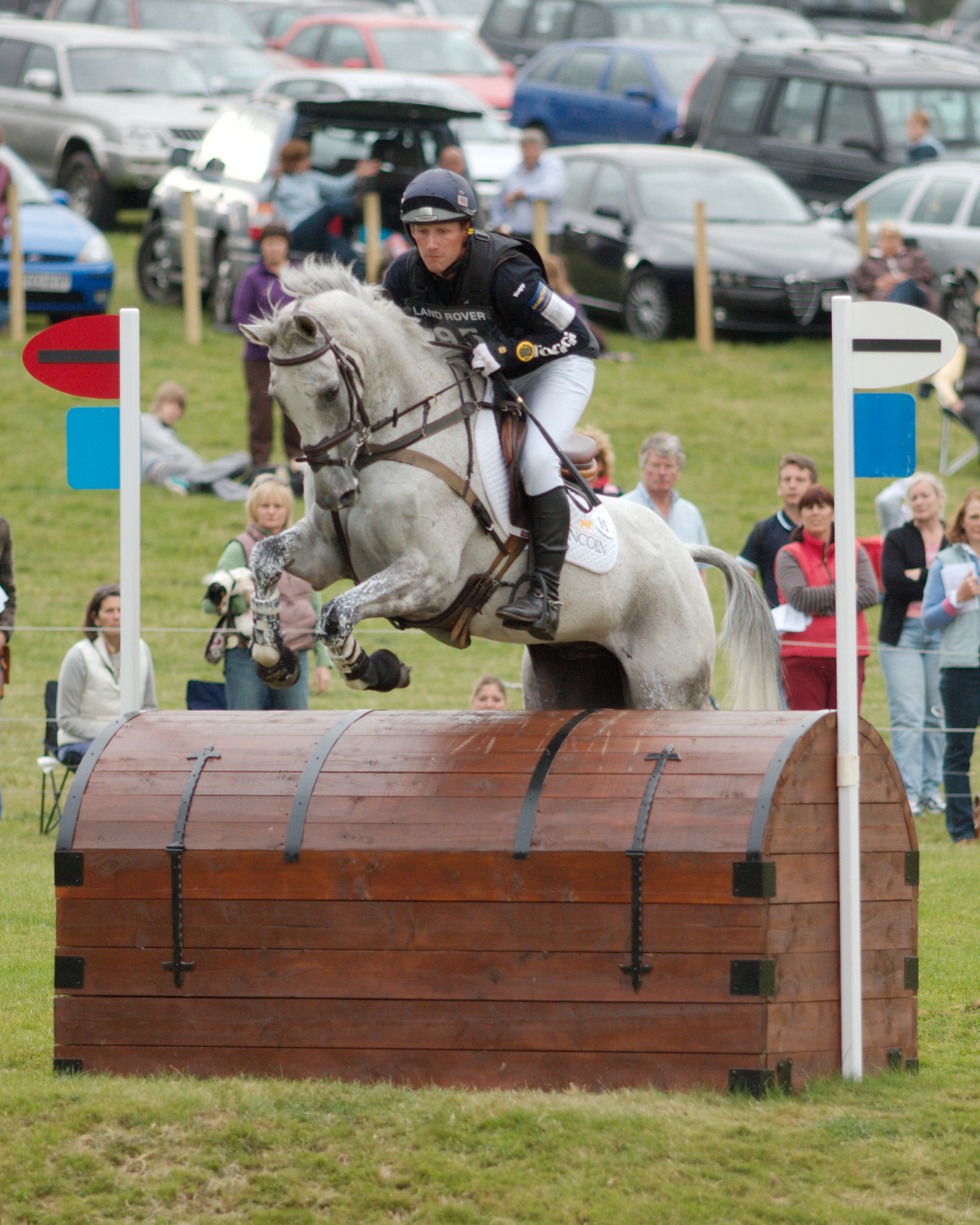
2009 winner Oliver Townend on Carousel Quest

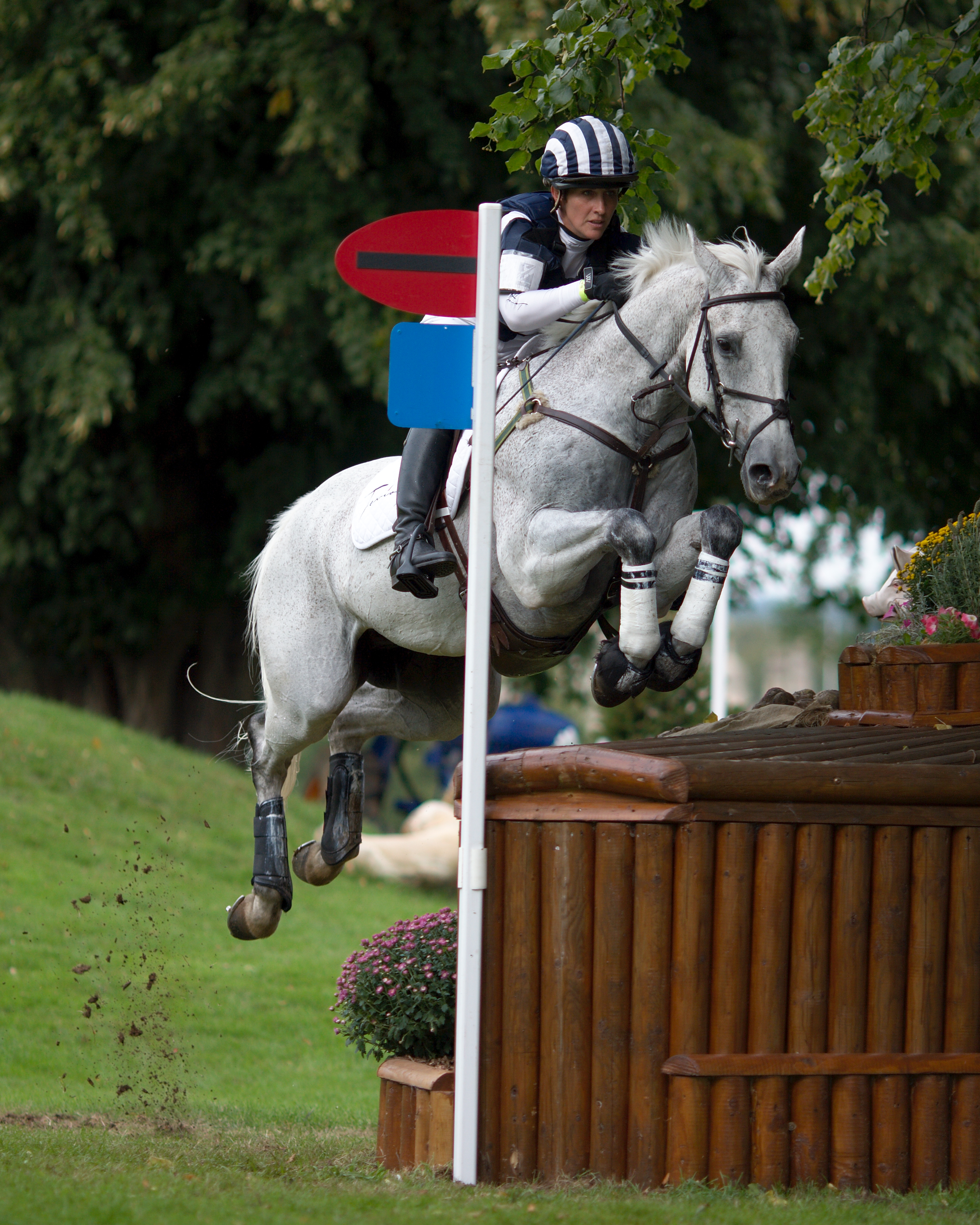
2010 winner Caroline Powell on Lenamore

Year	Rider	Horse
1961	Anneli Drummond-Hay (GBR)	Merely-A-Monarch
1962	James Templer (GBR)	M'Lord Connolly
1963	Harry Freeman-Jackson (IRL)	St. Finbarr
1964	Richard Meade (GBR)	Barberry
1965	J.J. Beale (GBR)	Victoria Bridge
1966	Carlos Moratorio (ARG)	Chalan
1967	Lorna Sutherland (GBR)	Popadom
1968	Sheila Willcox (GBR)	Fair and Square
1969	Gillian Watson (GBR)	Shaitan
1970	Judy Bradwell (GBR)	Don Camillo
1971	H.R.H. Princess Anne (GBR)	Doublet
1972	Janet Hodgson (GBR)	Larkspur
1973	Mark Phillips (GBR)	Maid Marion
1974	Bruce Davidson (USA)	Irish Cap
1975	Aly Pattinson (GBR)	Carawich
1976	Jane Holderness-Roddam (GBR)	Warrior
1977	Lucinda Prior-Palmer (GBR)	George
1978	Lorna Clarke (GBR)	Greco
1979	Andrew Hoy (AUS)	Davey
1980	Richard Walker (GBR)	John of Gaunt
1981	Lucinda Prior-Palmer (GBR)	Beagle Bay
1982	Richard Walker (GBR)	Ryan's Cross
1983	Virginia Holgate (GBR)	Priceless
1984	Virginia Holgate (GBR)	Night Cap II
1985	Virginia Holgate (GBR)	Priceless
1986	Virginia Leng (GBR)	Murphy Himself
1987	Mark Todd (NZL)	Wilton Fair
1988	Jane Thelwall (GBR)	King's Jester
1989	Virginia Leng (GBR)	Master Craftsman
1990	Mark Todd (NZL)	Face the Music
1991	Mark Todd (NZL)	Welton Greylag
1992	Charlotte Hollingsworth (GBR)	The Cool Customer
1993	Stephen Bradley (USA)	Sassy Reason
1994	William Fox-Pitt (GBR)	Chaka
1995	Andrew Nicholson (NZL)	Buckley Province
1996	Mary King (GBR)	Star Appeal
1997	Mark Todd (NZL)	Broadcast News
1998	Blyth Tait (NZL)	Chesterfield
1999	Mark Todd (NZL)	Diamond Hall Red
2000	Andrew Nicholson (NZL)	Mr. Smiffy
2001	Blyth Tait (NZL)	Ready Teddy
2002	William Fox-Pitt (GBR)	Highland Lad
2003	Pippa Funnell (GBR) (Note: Won as the final leg on the way to winning the Eventing Grand Slam)	Primmore's Pride
2004	Andrew Hoy (AUS)	Moon Fleet
2005	William Fox-Pitt (GBR)	Ballincoola
2006	Lucinda Fredericks (AUS)	Headley Britannia
2007	William Fox-Pitt (GBR)	Parkmore Ed
2008	William Fox-Pitt (GBR)	Tamarillo
2009	Oliver Townend (GBR)	Carousel Quest
2010	Caroline Powell (NZL)	Lenamore
2011	William Fox-Pitt (GBR)	Parklane Hawk
2012	Andrew Nicholson (NZL)	Avebury
2013	Andrew Nicholson (NZL)	Avebury
2014	Andrew Nicholson (NZL)	Avebury
2015	Michael Jung (GER) (Note: Won as the first leg on the way to winning the Eventing Grand Slam)	La Biosthetique-Sam FBW
2016	Chris Burton (AUS)	Nobilis 18
2017	Oliver Townend (GBR)	Ballaghmor Class
2018	Tim Price (NZL)	Ringwood Sky Boy
2019	Pippa Funnell (GBR)	MGH Grafton Street
2020	Cancelled due to COVID-19 pandemic	
2021	Cancelled due to COVID-19 pandemic; replaced by Bicton Arena International 5*	
2022	Piggy March (GBR)	Vanir Kamira
2023	Oliver Townend (GBR)	Ballaghmor Class
2024	Ros Canter (GBR)	Lordships Graffalo
2025	Ros Canter (GBR)	Lordships Graffalo
2026	Gemma Stevens (GBR)	Chilli Knight

== Casualties and incidents ==
- 1988: Mark Davies (GBR) was killed when he fell at fence 26 during cross country at Burghley.
- 1990: Ian Stark (GBR) was disqualified for excessive pressing of his exhausted horse, Alfresco, during the event.
- 1999: Simon Long (GBR) was killed when his horse Springleaze Macaroo flipped over a fence and crushed him during the cross country event.
- 2004: Caroline Pratt (GBR) was killed during a rotational fall from her mount, Primitive Streak, on cross country.
- 2009: Harry Meade (GBR) was disqualified and handed a red card for riding an exhausted horse. His mount, Dunauger No. 14 fell at fence 19.
- 2009: Paul Donovan (IRL) received a FEI Yellow Warning card for failing to stop after incurring three refusals on Sportsfield Sandyman. The citation was given for "Dangerous riding - Continuing after three clear refusals, a fall, or any form of elimination (Eventing Rules Art. 525)" during the CCI4* event.
- 2009: A runaway tractor rolled down a hill into a car parking area, causing thousands of pounds in damage and "panicking spectators".
- 2010: Nicola Malcom (GBR) was airlifted to the hospital after she and her horse McFly fell at a fence during the cross country competition.
- 2011: Michael Pollard (USA) received a Yellow Warning card for Abuse of Horse - Riding an exhausted Horse (Eventing Rules Art. 526) during the CCI4*.
- 2012: Heartbreak Hill ridden by Paul Hart (SA) was euthanized on the cross country course after breaking his leg while competing.
- 2012: Sam Watson (IRL) received a Yellow Warning card for Abuse of Horse - Excessive pressing of a tired Horse (Eventing Rules Art. 526), Dangerous riding - Too fast or too slow (Eventing Rules Art. 525) during the CCI4*.
- 2013: Clifton Promise, ridden by Jonathan Paget (NZL) was found to have reserpine, a banned substance in his system while competing. Clifton Promise was disqualified.
- 2013: Clifton Pinot, ridden by Kevin McNab (AUS) was found to have reserpine, a banned substance in his system while competing. Clifton Pinot was disqualified from the competition.
- 2014: Orto, ridden by Sara Squires (UK) was euthanized after experiencing a fatal injury from hitting a fence during cross country.
- 2014: Three riders were hospitalized after falls on cross country, Natalie Blundell (AUS), Gina Ruck (GBR) and Neil Spratt (NZL).
- 2014: Megan Heath (NZL) received a Yellow Warning card for Abuse of Horse - Excessive use of whip, bit and/or spurs (Eventing Rules Art. 526) during the CCI4* event.
- 2016: Paul Tapner (AUS) was hospitalized after a fall from Up In the Air during the cross-country portion of the event.
- 2019: David Britnell (GBR) received an Eventing Recorded Warning for Dangerous riding - Series of dangerous jumps (Eventing Rules Art. 525) at the CCI5* event.
- 2022: HD Bronze and Harry Mutch (GBR) fell at Cottesmore Leap during the cross-country portion of the event.
- 2022: Rosie Thomas (GBR) received several Recorded Warnings from the FEI for their conduct while riding Balladeer Humbel Guy. They were warned for Dangerous riding - Pressing a tired Horse (Eventing Rules Art. 525), Dangerous riding - Series of dangerous jumps (Eventing Rules Art. 525), Dangerous riding - Severe lack of responsiveness from the Horse or the Athlete (Eventing Rules Art. 525) during the CCI5* event.
- 2023: Julia Norman (GBR) was cited with an Eventing Recorded Warning by the FEI for "Abuse of Horse - Minor case of blood on the Horse (Eventing Rules Art. 526.1)" during the CCI5* at Burghley.
- 2024: Will Rawlin (GBR) was cited with an Eventing Recorded Warning by the FEI for "Abuse of Horse - Excessive pressing of a tired Horse (Eventing Rules Art. 526): during the CCI5* at Burghley.
