= Sylvester (film) =

1985 film by Tim Hunter

- Theatrical release poster by Tom Jung
- Directed by: Tim Hunter
- Written by: Carol Sobieski
- Produced by: Martin Jurow
- Starring: Richard Farnsworth; Melissa Gilbert; Michael Schoeffling
- Cinematography: Hiro Narita
- Edited by: David Garfield; Suzanne Pettit; Howard E. Smith
- Music by: Lee Holdridge, the Textones
- Production company: Rastar
- Distributed by: Columbia Pictures
- Release date: March 15, 1985
- Running time: 104 minutes
- Country: United States
- Language: English
- Box office: $385,687

Sylvester is a 1985 American family drama film directed by Tim Hunter and starring Richard Farnsworth and Melissa Gilbert. The film was nominated for a Young Artist Award in 1986.

== Plot ==
A young woman called Charlie (Gilbert) is an orphan and the sole caretaker of her two brothers. She works at a livestock auction and notices a grey horse meant to be a bronco that she decides to ride. With the help of Mr. Foster (Farnsworth), a retired cavalry rider, they turn the grey bronc horse, “Sylvester,” into a three-day eventing horse. Charlie is approached after the event by a woman who wants to buy Sylvester and take Charlie under her wing to further her equestrian abilities.

== Cast ==
- Richard Farnsworth as Foster
- Melissa Gilbert as Charlie
- Michael Schoeffling as Matt
- Constance Towers as Muffy
- Peter Kowanko as Harris
- Arliss Howard as Peter
- James Gammon as Steve
- Travis Elliston as Kid

== Production ==
The film was filmed on location in Marfa and Alpine, Texas, and at the Kentucky Horse Park in Lexington, Kentucky in the summer of 1984.

One of the horses to play Sylvester was The Gray Goose. His handler Kim Walnes doubled for Gilbert in the action shots at the Kentucky Horse Park.

== Soundtrack ==
Three songs by the Textones (Carla Olson, Phil Seymour, George Callins, Joe Read and Tom Jr Morgan) are heard in the film: "Number One Is to Survive", "It's a Matter of Time" and "It's Okay".

== See also ==
- List of films about horses
- List of films about horse racing
