= Golden Willow (horse) =

Racing horse

- Breed: American Thoroughbred
- Sire: Cloth of Gold
- Grandsire: Sir Galahad II
- Dam: Pussy Willow
- Sex: Gelding
- Foaled: 1943, USA
- Country: UK
- Colour: Light Bay
- Owner: Mrs. Eleanor Home Kidston

Golden Willow was the youngest horse to ever win the Badminton Horse Trials. The then-five-year-old won the first year of the event, in 1949, with rider John Shedden. Today, horses must be a minimum of seven years old to compete in the difficult competition, and most horses that compete are no younger than 10.

Golden Willow was imported from America in 1948. He began running in hunter trials, winning four his first autumn in England. The horse was very hot and quirky, but his experienced rider managed to do quite well on him. However, Shedden did take several precautions with the very strong horse: he always rode him in a gag bit while on cross-country, used a tight standing martingale, and tied a piece of string from the saddle to his belt so that if he fell off he might still have control of the horse. Despite this Golden Willow was very talented, with tremendous scope and a great jump.

Golden Willow competed in the prestigious Badminton Horse Trials in 1949, the first year of the event. There he had an impressive cross-country run, cleared the Irish Bank in a single jump, and went on to win. He returned the next year, only to finish fifth, although it is believed by some that poor time keeping robbed the horse of his second win. Kidston then sent him into training as a racehorse, which was a mistake, as the horse could not mentally take the rigors of training. On his first gallop he ran away with his jockey, and did not stop for fourteen miles, after his tendons broke down. After eighteen months of recovery, he was again sent back to train, but he simply ran away and broke down again.
