= Stephen Bradley (equestrian) =

American equestrian

Medal record

Equestrian

Representing the United States

Pan American Games
Gold medal – first place	2003 Fair Hill	Team eventing
Gold medal – first place	2007 Rio de Janeiro	Team eventing

Stephen Shelton Bradley (born March 26, 1962, in Middleburg, Virginia) is an internationally successful rider in the equestrian sport of eventing. He has competed internationally since 1989, with great achievements including a place on the US Eventing Team at the 1992 Summer Olympics, and in 1993 he became only the second American to have won the prestigious Burghley Horse Trials.

Bradley had a bad fall at the 1992 Rolex Kentucky Three Day, but returned to competition the following year with several impressive wins.

Some of his best horses include Brandenburg’s Joshua, Sassy Reason, Dr. Dolittle, and Fröm

== Achievements ==
2007

- Team gold medal 2007 Pan American Games (From)
- 2nd Jersey Fresh CCI*** (From)

2006

- 3rd Rolex Kentucky Three Day (Brandenburg's Joshua)
- 1st Poplar Place Advanced Horse Trials

2005

- 1st Foxhall Cup CCI*** (Brandenburg's Joshua)

2004

- 1st Southern Pines Horse Trials
- 3rd Poplar Place Farm March Horse Trials
- 5th Rolex Kentucky CCI**** (From)

2003

- 40th Burghley Horse Trials CCI**** (From)
- 13th Rolex Kentucky CCI**** (From)
- Team Gold at the Pan American Games (Brandenburg's Joshua)

1996

- 1st Rolex Kentucky Three Day CCI*** (Dr. Dolittle)

1993

- 1st Burghley Horse Trials CCI**** (Sassy Reason)
- Equestrian Athlete of the Year by the US Olympic Committee
- 1st Checkmate International Horse Trials CCI***

1992

- 52nd Barcelona Olympic Games (Sassy Reason)
- 1st Checkmate International Horse Trials CCI***

1991

- 1st Checkmate International Horse Trials CCI***

1990

- Combined Training Horseman of the Year by the Chronicle of the Horse
- 9th for the U.S. Combined Training Association Horseman of the Year award
