= Headley Britannia =

Racing horse

Headly Britannia
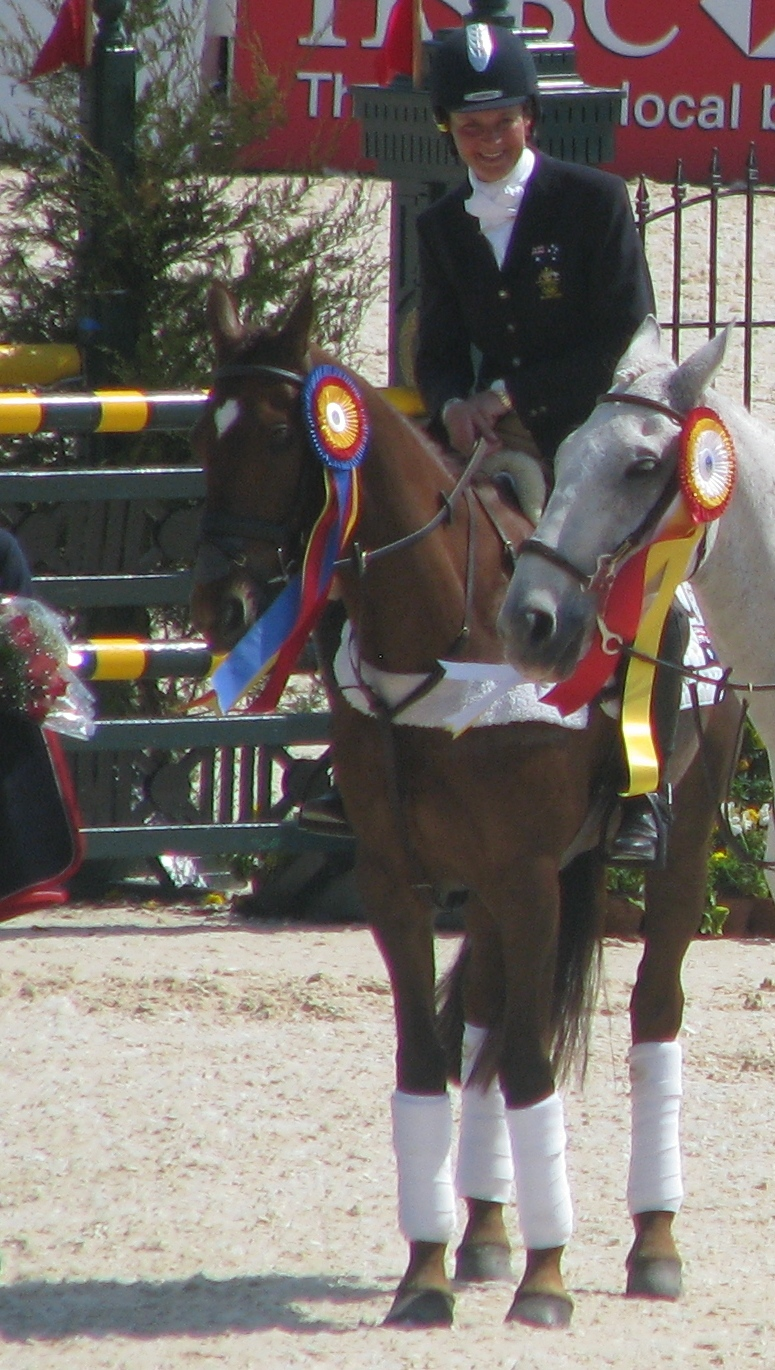
- Headley Britannia after winning the 2009 Rolex Kentucky CCI****
- Breed: Thoroughbred and Irish Draught blood
- Sire: Jumbo (Irish Sport Horse)
- Grandsire: Skippy (Irish Draught)
- Dam: Alan's Bambi (Thoroughbred)
- Maternal grandsire: Alanrod (Thoroughbred)
- Sex: 15.3 hh Mare
- Foaled: 1993
- Died: 1 April 2014
- Country: Australia
- Colour: Liver Chestnut with a star
- Breeder: Mike and Betty Hounsell, Headley Stud
- Owner: Lucinda and Clayton Fredericks
- Trainer: Lucinda Fredericks

Headley Britannia (January 24, 1993 - April 1, 2014), stable name Brit, was a mare who competed at the highest levels of the equestrian sport of eventing. Relatively small for the sport, her jumping ability, manoeuvrability and willingness propelled her to the top of the sport.

Headley Britannia was by one of the top eventing stallions in Britain, Jumbo, who first competed at the Advanced level with Andrew Nicholson as a seven-year-old. The stallion has been a top producer of eventers, dressage horses (his get have reached Prix St. George), and Grade A show jumpers.

Headley Britannia's greatest accomplishments include a win at the 2006 Burghley Horse Trials, the first mare in 33 years to do so, a win at the 2007 Badminton Horse Trials, the first mare in 53 years, and a win at the 2009 Rolex Kentucky Three Day. She came third at the 2006 Luhmuhlen Three Day Event, a great accomplishment after having taken a fall the previous year on cross-country and then contracting a virus which nearly killed her. She was an alternative to the 2006 World Equestrian Games, but when not called, was switched to the Burghley Horse Trials. She is one of only two horses in history to have won all three of the top four-star events (Badminton, Burghley, and Rolex), and has had a Breyer model made of her.

In 2007 her owners Katinka and Neil Thorburn gave her to her rider, Lucinda Fredericks. After winning Badminton she went to stud for embryo transfer. Both foals were by stallion Jaguar Mail and carried by surrogate mares.

The first of Brit's two foals was born in April 2008, a chestnut filly with a white star. Fredericks later confirmed that the second foal had been born in May 2008 this one being a dark bay colt. Strangely the foals resemble much like their parents, the filly, Little Britannia, is chestnut with a white star like her dam, and the colt, Britannia's Mail looking remarkably similar to his sire Jaguar Mail, dark bay in colour. Both foals are now part of Team Fredericks Foal syndicate which people can buy shares for Britannia's Mail is also available for stallion services

On March 15, 2012, it was announced by Team Fredericks that Headley Britannia would retire officially at Badminton Horse Trials. Due to the cancellation of Badminton in 2012 Badminton have agreed to hold this at the 2013 event instead.

Always small compared to the competition, her competitive spirit, manoeuvrability, sheer guts and a Will To Win have propelled her to the top. The plan is to enjoy competing her at a much lower level, breed more foals by Embryo Transfer and eventually hand the reins over to 8 year old Ellie who is champing at the bit to take the ride on. "It has been wonderful that Brit has been able to end her eventing career on a high at top level in a fit, sound and healthy state," she added.

Headley Britannia was euthanized at age 21 on 1 April 2014.
