= Kentucky Three-Day Event =

Eventing competition

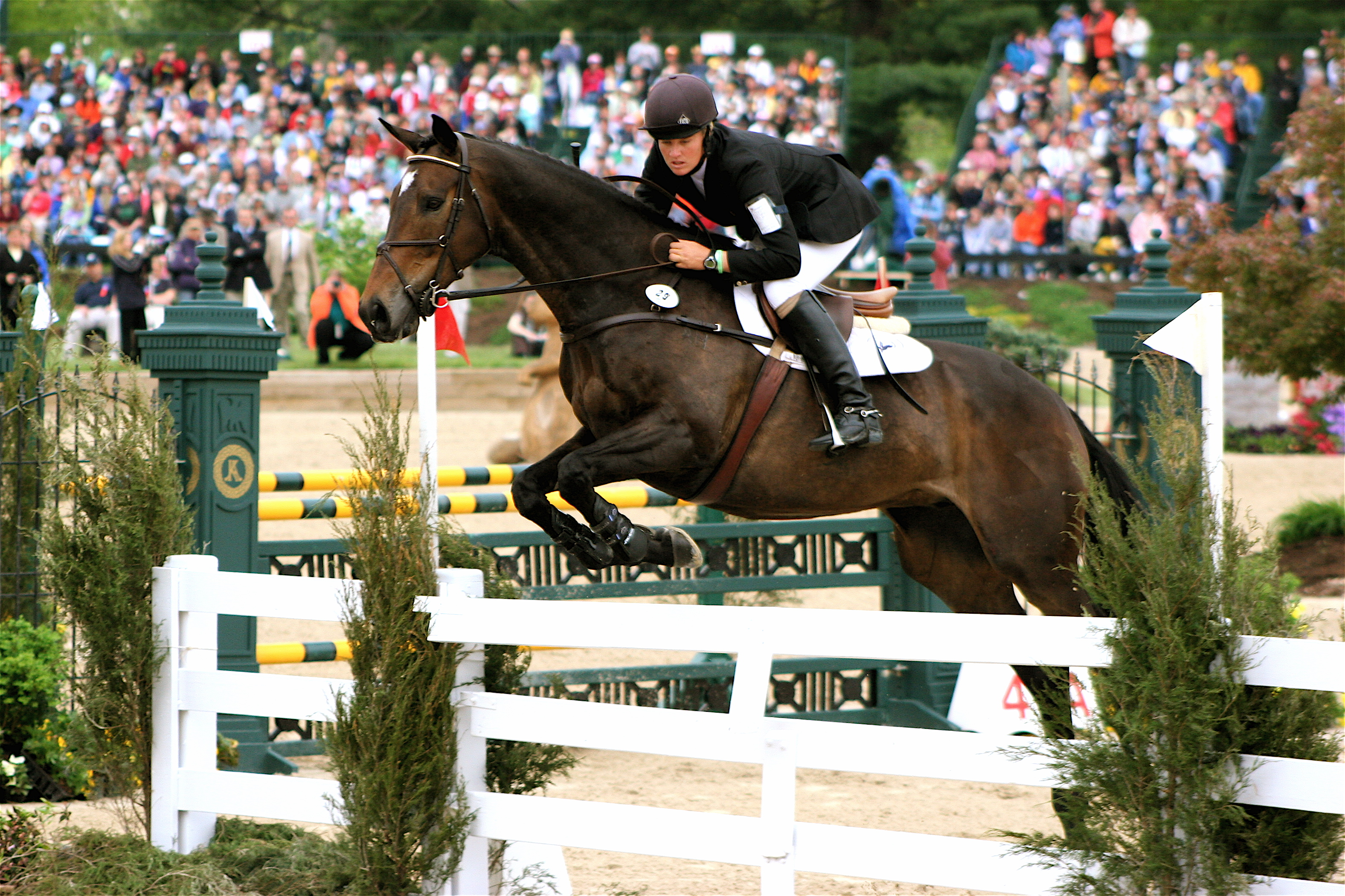
- Sanctioning body: International Federation for Equestrian Sports
- Location: Rolex Stadium, Kentucky Horse Park, Lexington, KY, USA
- Held: Annually
- Length: 4 days
- Sponsors: Defender
- Inaugurated: 1978
- Total purse: US$400,000
- Website: www.kentuckythreedayevent.com

The Kentucky Three-Day Event, currently the Defender Kentucky Three-Day Event due to sponsorship, is an eventing competition held at the Kentucky Horse Park in Lexington, Kentucky. Land Rover Kentucky is a CCI5*-L eventing competition. Five stars is the highest level of competition in the sport, the same level of competition as Eventing at the Olympics and the World Equestrian Games. The event is sponsored by Defender. Prize money of $400,000 is distributed among the top placings with $110,000 as well as a Rolex watch awarded to the first place horse and rider. The winning rider also gets a 12-month lease of a Defender (Defender Model)

Although the event's name continues to reflect its roots as a three-day competition, the Kentucky Three-Day Event currently takes place over four days (Thursday through Sunday). Due to large number of entries, both Thursday and Friday are devoted to the dressage test. Cross-country is on Saturday, and show jumping is on Sunday.

The Kentucky Three-Day Event is held the last weekend of April, the week before the Kentucky Derby. It is one of the three events in the Rolex Grand Slam of Eventing.

== History ==
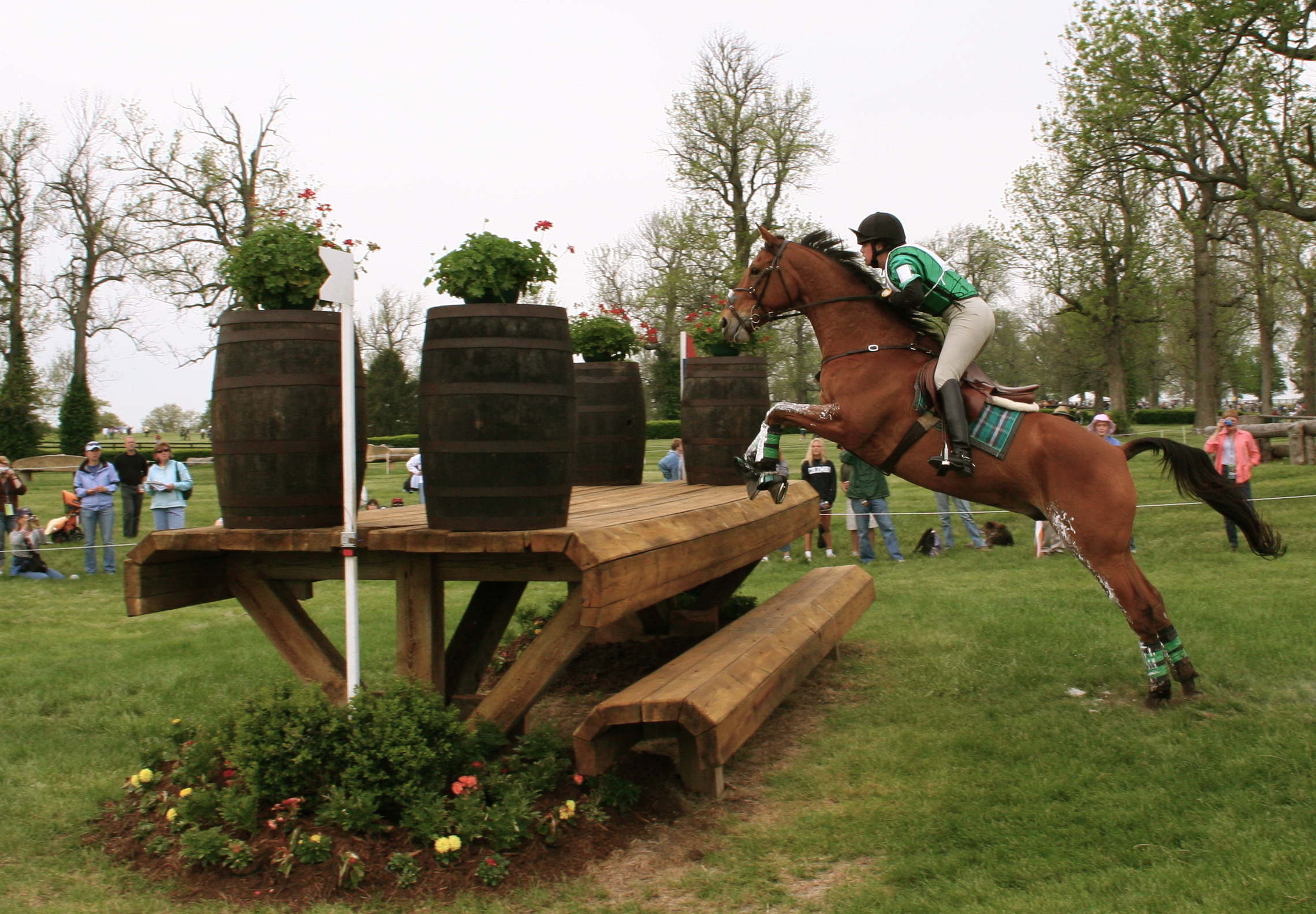
Rider and horse navigating an obstacle on the cross-country course

In 1974, Bruce Davidson and the United States Equestrian Team won individual and team gold at the World Championships held in Burghley, England. This gave the United States the right to hold the next World Championships four years later, in 1978. The Kentucky Horse Park in Lexington, Kentucky was due to open around the same time, and plans were made to hold the World Championships there.

Equestrian Events, Inc. (EEI) was formed to as a non-profit organization to help plan the competition and raise public awareness. The first horse trials at the Kentucky Horse Park was held in 1976, to prepare. In 1977, the National Pony Club Rally and the North American Junior Three-Day Event Championships were also held there.

The 1978 event had more than 170,000 spectators and added more than $4 million to the local economy. The event was broadcast worldwide, as well as nationally on CBS. The success of the World Championships helped to convince the EEU to continue the event annually. Today, the event is broadcast worldwide in 18 languages.

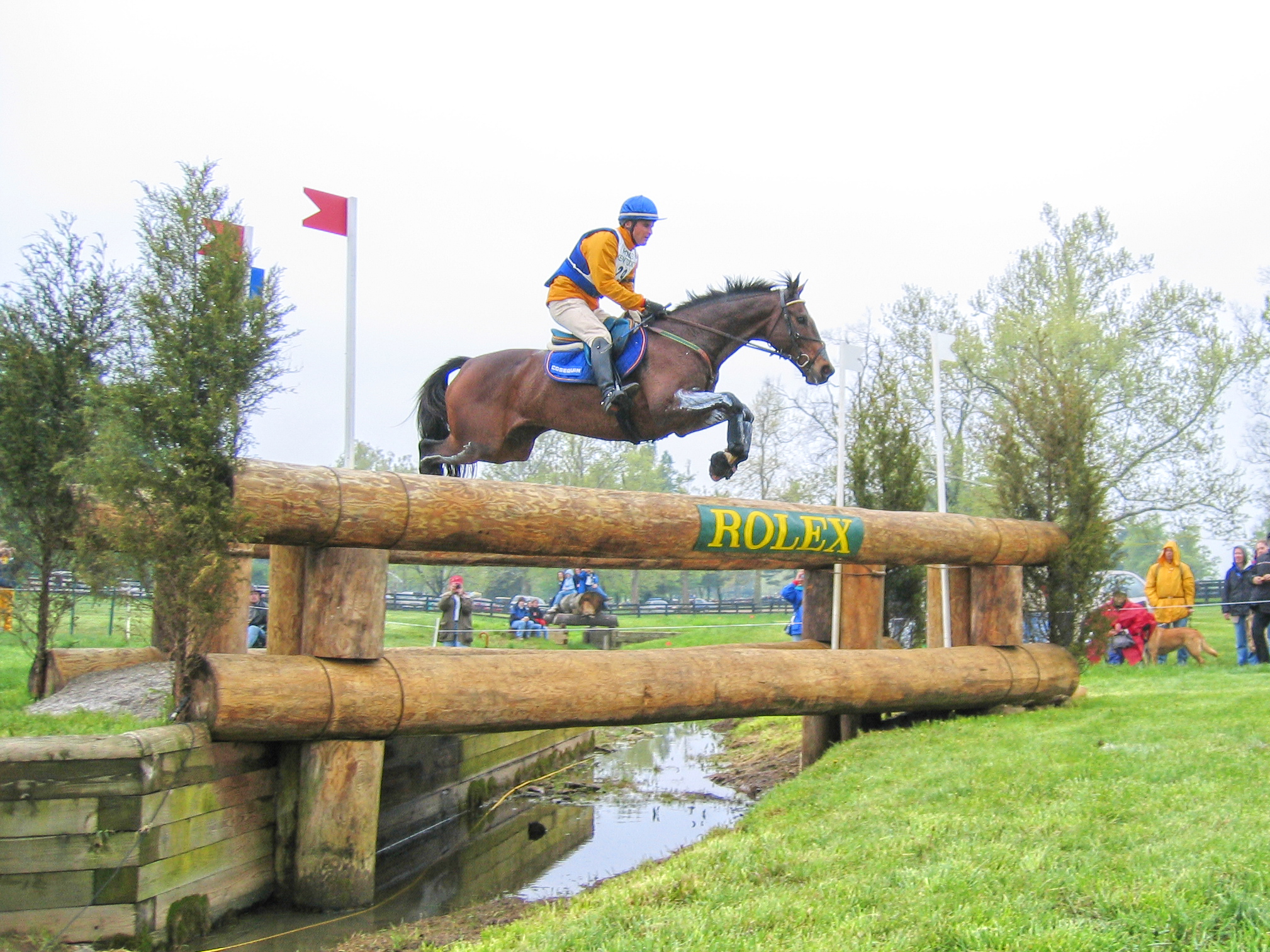
Rider and horse negotiating a rather difficult jump

Although the event began as an advanced three-day, and later included open intermediate and preliminary competitions, today it only holds the highest level: the CCI****. Intermediate-level competition was held in 1979 and from 1985 to 1981. An Advanced-level CCI was held from 1980 to 1999 up to the *** level, with Advanced Horse Trials (non-CCI) also held from 1992 to 1996. The CCI**** was begun in 1998, and has been held annually since. Since 2000, the CCI**** is the only competition held during this time, and the preliminary, intermediate, and CCI*** levels are not offered.

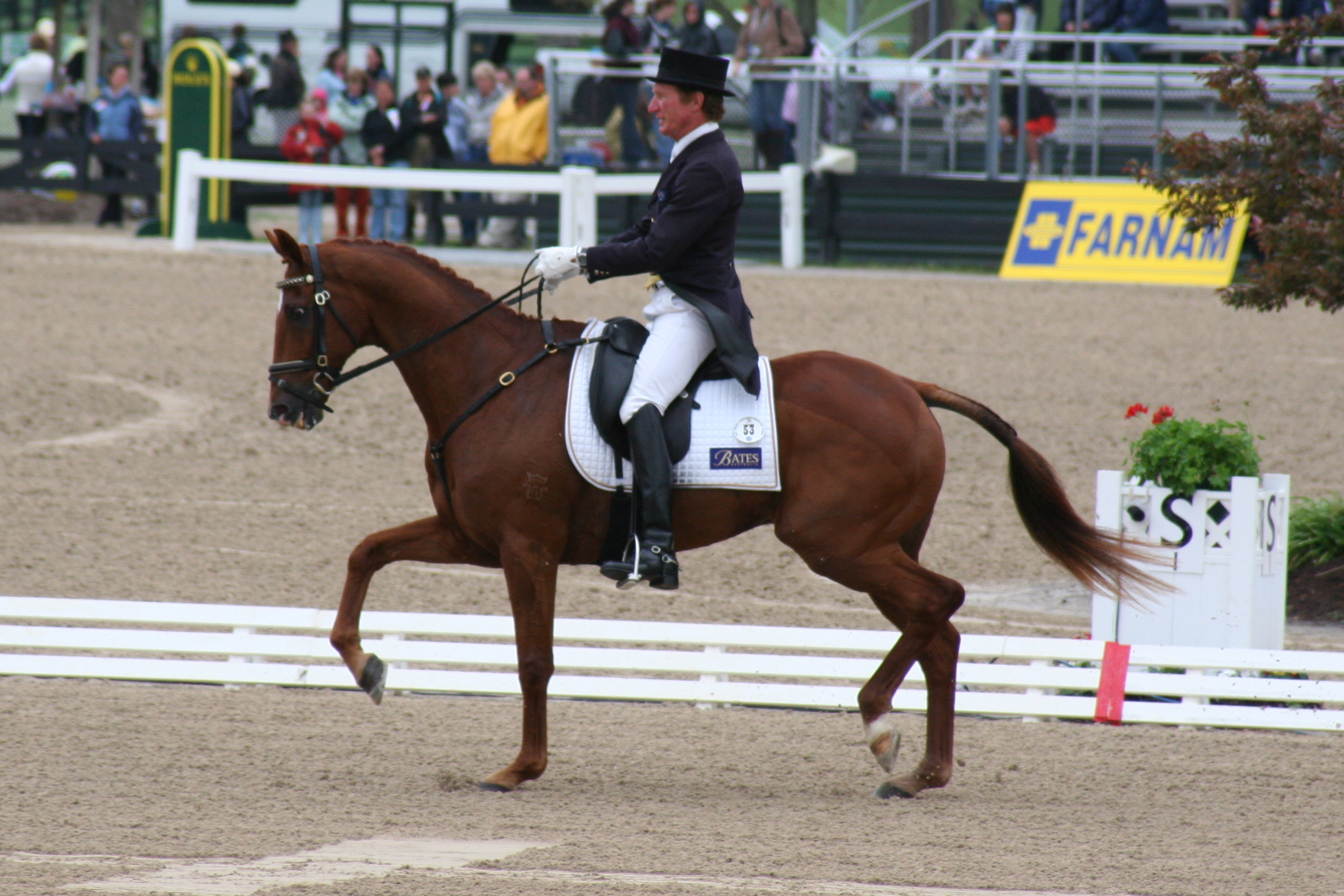
Rider and horse during the Dressage test

The Kentucky Three-Day Event also hoped to continue the classic format, despite the other major events around the world switching to the short format. Originally, the plan was to alternate years, offering the short format in even-numbered years as preparation for the Olympic Games or the World Championship, while running the classic format in odd-numbered years. However, in 2006 it was announced that, due to lack of funds and interest from upper level riders, the event would only offer the short format. Therefore, all competition run before 2005 (excluding the 2004 Modified division) was run "classic format," and from the 2006 event onward has been run in the "short format."

=== The CCI**** ===
The CCI**** competition was first suggested in 1994 by Denny Emerson, who believed the United States had enough competitors at this high level to warrant the development of a four-star. Previously, American riders trained in England when they were preparing for international competition, as the country had the only two annual CCI**** at that time: Badminton and Burghley. The USET began making plans in 1996, and held the country's first and the world's third annual four-star competition at the Kentucky Horse Park in 1998.

=== The CCI***** ===
After the 2018 season, the FEI added an introductory level below CCI*, bumping all subsequent levels upward. While there was no change to the difficulty of the competition, the added level forced all former CCI**** competitions to re-classify as CCI*****.

== Physicality of the sport ==
This sport takes many different precautions concerning the horse's health. Two horses died of a heart attack on the course in April 2008.

Self-efficacy is a way to assess themselves and the horse using a scientific method. Evaluating the health of the horse is important because the horse could easily get injured.

A study was done to compare the heart rate between a trained and untrained horse. The results show that trained horses do not have more stress or pain in comparison with untrained horses. However, if evaluated 30 minutes before competition, the trained horse would show less stress. According to this experiment the training method, "Deep and Round", put more stress on the horse.

== Winners ==
| Year | Rider | Horse | Notes |
|---|---|---|---|
| 1978 | Bruce Davidson (USA) | Might Tango | Eventing World Championships |
| 1978 | Team Canada | | Eventing World Championships |
| 1979 | Juliet Bishop (CAN) | Taxi | Modified Open Intermediate 3-Day |
| 1980 | Torrance Watkins (USA) | Poltroon | Modified Advanced 3-Day |
| 1981 | James C. Wofford (USA) | Carawich | Modified Advanced 3-Day USET Selection Trials |
| 1982 | Kim Walnes (USA) | The Gray Goose | Advanced 3-Day (CCI) |
| 1983 | Bruce Davidson (USA) | JJ Babu | Advanced 3-Day (CCI) |
| 1984 | Bruce Davidson (USA) | Dr. Peaches | Advanced 3-Day (CCI) |
| 1985 | Derek di Grazia (USA) | Sasquatch | Advanced 3-Day (CCI) |
| 1986 | James C. Wofford (USA) | The Optimist | Advanced 3-Day (CCI) |
| 1987 | Kerry Millikin (USA) | The Pirate | Advanced 3-Day (CCI) |
| 1988 | Bruce Davidson (USA) | Dr. Peaches | Advanced 3-Day (CCI), Olympic Selection Trial |
| 1989 | Bruce Davidson (USA) | Dr. Peaches | Advanced 3-Day (CCI) |
| 1990 | David O'Connor (USA) | Wilton Fair | Advanced 3-Day (CCI**) |
| 1991 | Karen Lende (USA) | Mr. Maxwell | Advanced 3-Day (CCI***) |
| 1992 | Stuart Young-Black (CAN) | Von Perrier | Advanced 3-Day (CCI***) Olympic Selection Trial |
| 1993 | Bruce Davidson (USA) | Happy Talk | Advanced 3-Day (CCI***) |
| 1994 | Julie Gomena (USA) | Treaty | Advanced 3-Day (CCI***) |
| 1995 | David O'Connor (USA) | Custom Made | Advanced 3-Day (CCI***) Olympic Qualifying Competition |
| 1996 | Stephen Bradley (USA) | Dr. Dolittle | Advanced 3-Day (CCI***) USET Selection Trial |
| 1997 | Karen O'Connor (USA) | Worth the Trust | Advanced 3-Day (CCI***) |
| 1998 | Nick Larkin (NZL) | Red | CCI**** |
| 1998 | Tiffani Loudon (USA) | Makabi | CCI*** |
| 1999 | Karen O'Connor (USA) | Prince Panache | CCI**** |
| 1999 | Kimberly Vinoski (USA) | Over the Limit | CCI*** |
| 2000 | Blyth Tait (NZL) | Welton Envoy | Began running as solely a CCI**** event |
| 2001 | David O'Connor (USA) | Giltedge | |
| 2001 | Kimberly Severson (USA) | Winsome Adante | |
| 2003 | Pippa Funnell (GBR) | Primmore's Pride | Won as the first leg of eventual Rolex Grand Slam win |
| 2004 | Kimberly Severson (USA) | Winsome Adante | |
| 2004 | Darren Chiacchia (USA) | Windfall II | Modified CCI**** Division |
| 2005 | Kimberly Severson (USA) | Winsome Adante | |
| 2006 | Andrew Hoy (AUS) | Master Monarch | Run without steeplechase |
| 2007 | Clayton Fredericks (AUS) | Ben Along Time | |
| 2008 | Phillip Dutton (USA) | Connaught | |
| 2009 | Lucinda Fredericks (AUS) | Headley Britannia | |
| 2010 | William Fox-Pitt (GBR) | Cool Mountain | |
| 2011 | Mary King (GBR) | King's Temptress | Also finished 2nd on Fernhill Urco |
| 2012 | William Fox-Pitt (GBR) | Parklane Hawk | |
| 2013 | Andrew Nicholson (NZL) | Quimbo | |
| 2014 | William Fox-Pitt (GBR) | Bay My Hero | |
| 2015 | Michael Jung (GER) | fischerRocana FST | |
| 2016 | Michael Jung (GER) | fischerRocana FST | Won as the second leg on the way to winning the Rolex Grand Slam |
| 2017 | Michael Jung (GER) | fischerRocana FST | First person to win 3x in a row on same horse |
| 2018 | Oliver Townend (GBR) | Cooley Master Class | |
| 2019 | Oliver Townend (GBR) | Cooley Master Class | First year of CCI5* classification |
| 2020 | Not Held Due to COVID-19 pandemic | | |
| 2021 | Oliver Townend (GBR) | Ballaghmor Class | |
| 2022 | Michael Jung (GER) | fischerChipmunk FRH | |
| 2023 | Tamie Smith (USA) | Mai Baum | becoming the first US winner of the event since 2008 and the first female winner since 2011. |
| 2024 | Oliver Townend (GBR) | Cooley Rosalent | |

== Casualties and incidents ==
=== Riders ===
- 2010: Rider Oliver Townend (GBR) was airlifted to the hospital after he and his mount Ashdale Cruise Master experienced a serious fall at fence 20. Townend cited his air bag vest for saving his life after the accident, Ashdale Cruise Master was euthanized less than a year later of neurological issues.

=== Horses ===
- 1998: Boucane ridden by Yves Landry (CAN) died after rupturing an aorta and falling at jump 7C during the cross country portion of the event.
- 2002: Titlelist ridden by Mark Weissbecker (USA) died of a broken neck after falling and hitting his hind legs on the 10th fence of the cross-country event.
- 2007: Le Samaurai was euthanized after suffering a "proximal displacement of the proximal sesamoid bones" and thrombosis of the vessels of the lower limb. The horse became noticeably lame after suffering injuries during the cross-country event, yet his rider Amy Tyron (USA) encouraged her mount to complete the course. The FEI later sanctioned Amy Tyron for two months for the incident.
- 2008: Frodo Baggins was euthanized after crashing into a jump on cross country after his rider Laine Asker (USA) misjudged the obstacle.
- 2008: The Quiet Man died after suffering a severe shoulder injury after falling with his rider Sarah Hansel (USA) on the cross country portion of the event.
- 2009: Kingpin ridden by Mike Winter (CAN) died while competing on the cross country course of a fatal hemorrhage.
- 2015: Dambala (ridden by Emily Cammock NZL) was euthanized after sustaining a suspensory injury while participating in the cross country phase of the CCI4* event. It was his first CCI4*.
- 2024: Quasi Cool fell at the last fence on the cross country course after his rider Philip Dutton (USA) improperly calculated the distance to the final obstacle. The horse was down and attended to by veterinarians behind screens after the accident.
- 2024: Zach Brandt (USA) riding Direct Advance received a FEI yellow card for “Abuse of Horse—Riding an exhausted Horse” in accordance with eventing rule 526 after the cross-country portion of the event. Brandt was later eliminated by the ground jury.
- 2024: Susie Berry (IRL) riding Clever Trick received a warning for “Abuse of Horse—Minor case of blood on the Horse” in accordance with eventing rule 526.1.
