= Happy Talk (horse) =

Horse ridden by American Bruce Davidson in the sport of eventing

- Breed: Thoroughbred
- Sire: Hardboy
- Grandsire: Hard Ridden
- Dam: Mon Capitaine Mare
- Maternal grandsire: Mon Capitaine
- Sex: Gelding
- Foaled: 1983, Ireland
- Country: United States
- Colour: Bay with a star
- Owner: Bruce Davidson and Dr. Brendan Furlong

Happy Talk was a horse ridden by American Bruce Davidson in the sport of eventing.

Happy Talk was bought by Furlong's brother from Clare Ryan, and was imported to the United States. He was originally intended to be shown in hunter classes at the Royal Dublin Horse Show, but he contracted ringworm and could not compete. Brendan Furlong bought the gelding as a four-year-old, and sent him to show jumper Michele Grubb, but Happy Talk's personality was not suited to the discipline.

Dr. Furlong's wife, Wendy, began bringing the horse along in eventing, before Davidson began riding him.

Davidson described Happy Talk as one of the most difficult to produce of all of his top eventing horses, as he was very stiff in his topline. Davidson persisted, and competed the horse three times at the Rolex Kentucky Three Day: 1992, 1993, and 1995. Happy Talk won the event in 1993, and finished eighth and seventeenth respectively in 1992 and 1995.

Happy Talk was retired at Dr. Furlong's farm in Pittstown, New Jersey.
