= Oliver Townend =

British equestrian sportsman

Oliver David Townend MBE
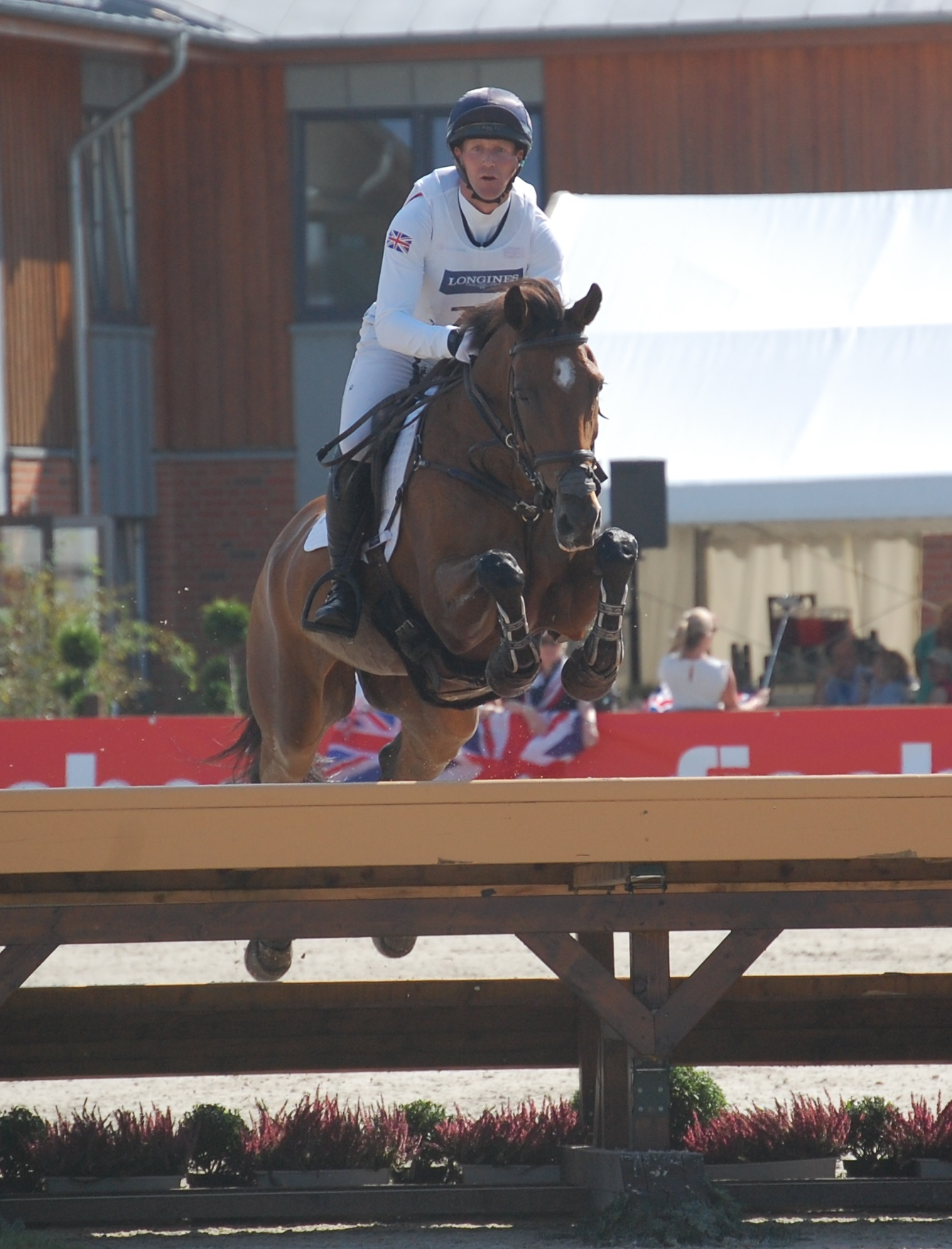
- Townend and Cooley Master Class, 2019 European Eventing Championship

Personal information
- Nationality: United Kingdom
- Discipline: Eventing
- Born: 15 November 1982 (age 43); Huddersfield, Yorkshire, England
Medal record
Equestrian
Representing Great Britain
Olympic Games
Gold medal – first place	2020 Tokyo	Team eventing
European Championships
Gold medal – first place	2007 Pratoni del Vivaro	Team Eventing
Gold medal – first place	2009 Fontainebleau	Team Eventing
Gold medal – first place	2017 Strzegom	Team Eventing
Silver medal – second place	2019 Luhmühlen	Team eventing

Oliver David Townend (born 15 November 1982) is a British horse rider. He has represented Great Britain at the European Eventing Championships, winning the team gold medals in 2007, 2009, and 2017. He has also won competing in events such as the Badminton Horse Trials, Burghley Horse Trials, and the Kentucky Three-Day Event.

Townend represented Great Britain at the World Equestrian Games in 2006 and 2014. He was the Event Rider Masters series champion in 2016 and has been ranked world number one in eventing twice, in 2009 and 2018. He has also been ranked number one British eventing rider on seven occasions since 2009.

== Biography ==
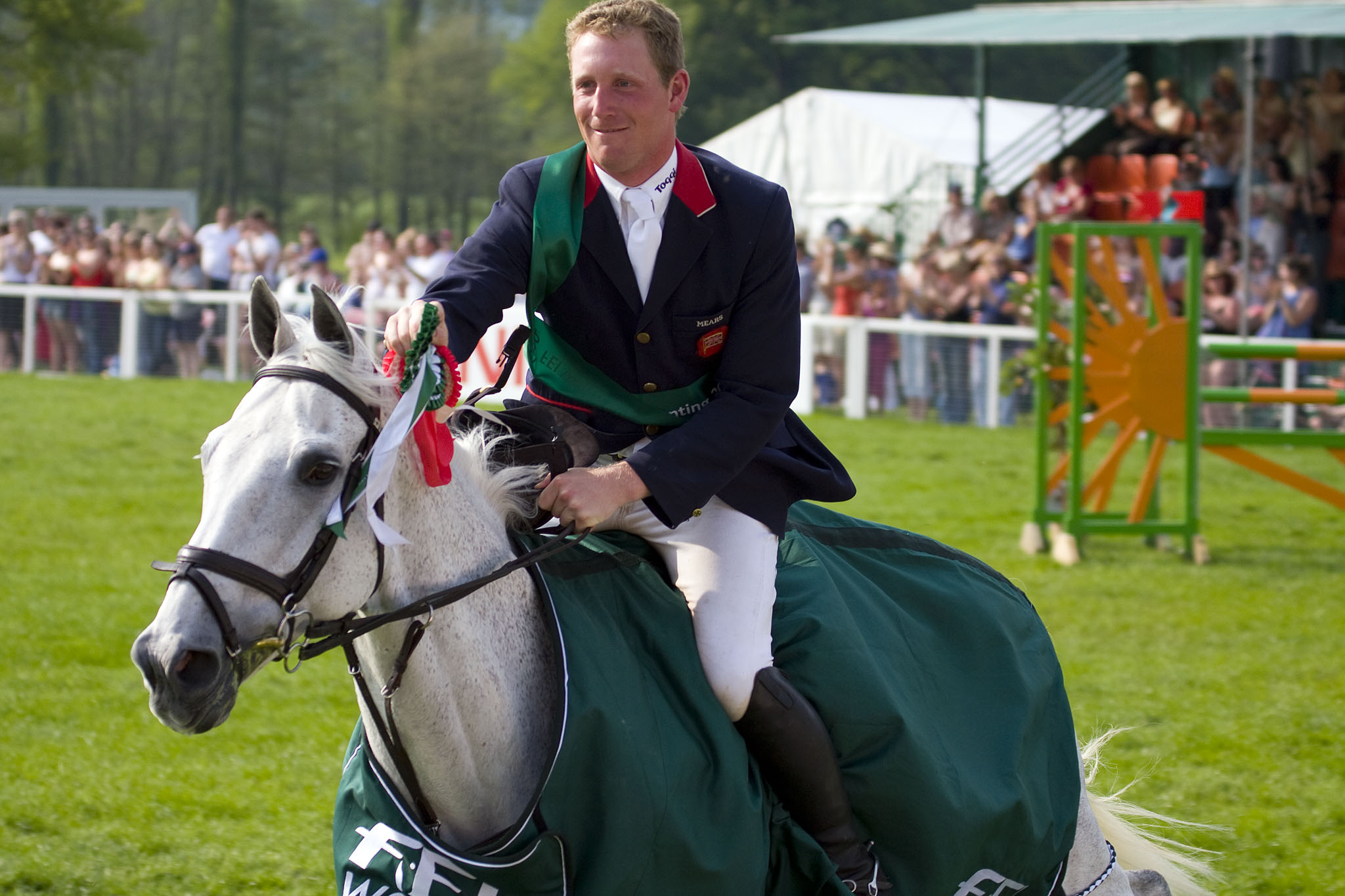
Townend on Flint Curtis at the 2008 World Cup leg of Chatsworth

Townend grew up in Scapegoat Hill, near Huddersfield in West Yorkshire. He won the junior newcomers showjumping at the Horse of the Year Show with Cool Mule at age 11, rode in the pony European Eventing Championships at age 13, and left school at 16 to pursue a career in riding and selling horses. His father was an event rider and his mother was a side-saddle rider.

In 2010, Townend suffered a rotational fall at the Rolex Kentucky Three Day in Lexington, Kentucky, and was crushed by his horse. He broke his collarbone, shoulder bones, sternum, and four ribs, but credited his airbag vest with minimizing his injuries.

Townend currently lives in Ellesmere, Shropshire.

He was appointed Member of the Order of the British Empire (MBE) in the 2022 New Year Honours for services to equestrianism.

=== Whip use ===
Townend has received several warnings for excessive whip use during competitions and for riding fatigued horses. He received warnings for "abuse of the horse" in 2014, and for "abuse of the horse and wrong use of the whip" at Floors Castle in 2017. In 2018, he received an official warning for “abuse of horse/excessive use of the whip” at the Badminton Horse Trials. He subsequently lost two sponsors and apologized. He received further warnings for whip use at the Blair Castle International Horse Trials in 2018 and at an indoor horse trial competition in Stockholm in 2022, and was disciplined by the FEI for dangerous riding at Badminton Horse Trials in 2023.

== Winning International Championships ==
Results
Year	Event	Horse	Placing	Notes
2007	European Championships	Flint Curtis	1st place, gold medalist(s)	Team
2009	European Championships	Flint Curtis	1st place, gold medalist(s)	Team
2017	European Championships	Willingapark Cooley	1st place, gold medalist(s)	Team
2019	European Championships	Cooley Master Class	2nd place, silver medalist(s)	Team
2020	World Young Horse Championships	Cooley Rosalent	2nd place, silver medalist(s)	CCI**
2021	Olympic Games	Ballaghmor Class	1st place, gold medalist(s)	Team
EL = Eliminated; RET = Retired; WD = Withdrew

== Notable horses ==
- Flint Curtis
  - 2006 Badminton Horse Trials third place
  - 2007 & 2009 European Championships – team gold
  - 2009 Badminton Horse Trials winner
- Carousel Quest
  - 2009 Burghley Horse Trials winner
- Armarda
  - 2014 Badminton Horse Trials runner-up
- Willingapark Cooley
  - 2017 European Championships – team gold
  - 2018 Badminton Horse Trials runner-up
- Cillnabraden Evo
  - Badminton 5* dressage record holder (19.7)
- Ballaghmor Class
  - 2017 Burghley Horse Trials winner
  - 2018 Burghley Horse Trials runner-up
  - 2019 Badminton Horse Trials runner-up
  - 2019 Burghley Horse Trials runner-up
  - 2021 Kentucky Horse Trials winner
  - 2020 Olympic Games – team gold, individual 5th
  - 2023 Badminton Horse Trials runner-up
  - 2023 Burghley Horse Trials winner
  - 2024 Maryland 5* winner
- Cooley Master Class
  - 2018 & 2019 Kentucky Horse Trials winner
  - 2019 European Championships – team silver, individual 9th
  - 2021 Maryland Horse Trials runner-up
- Swallow Springs
  - 2022 Badminton Horse Trials third place
- As Is
  - 2022 Maryland Horse Trials third place
- Cooley Rosalent
  - 2020 World Young Horse 6-Year-Old runner-up
  - 2023 Maryland Horse Trials third place
- Tregilder
  - 2023 Pau 5* runner-up
