= Badminton Horse Trials =

Annual equestrian event in England

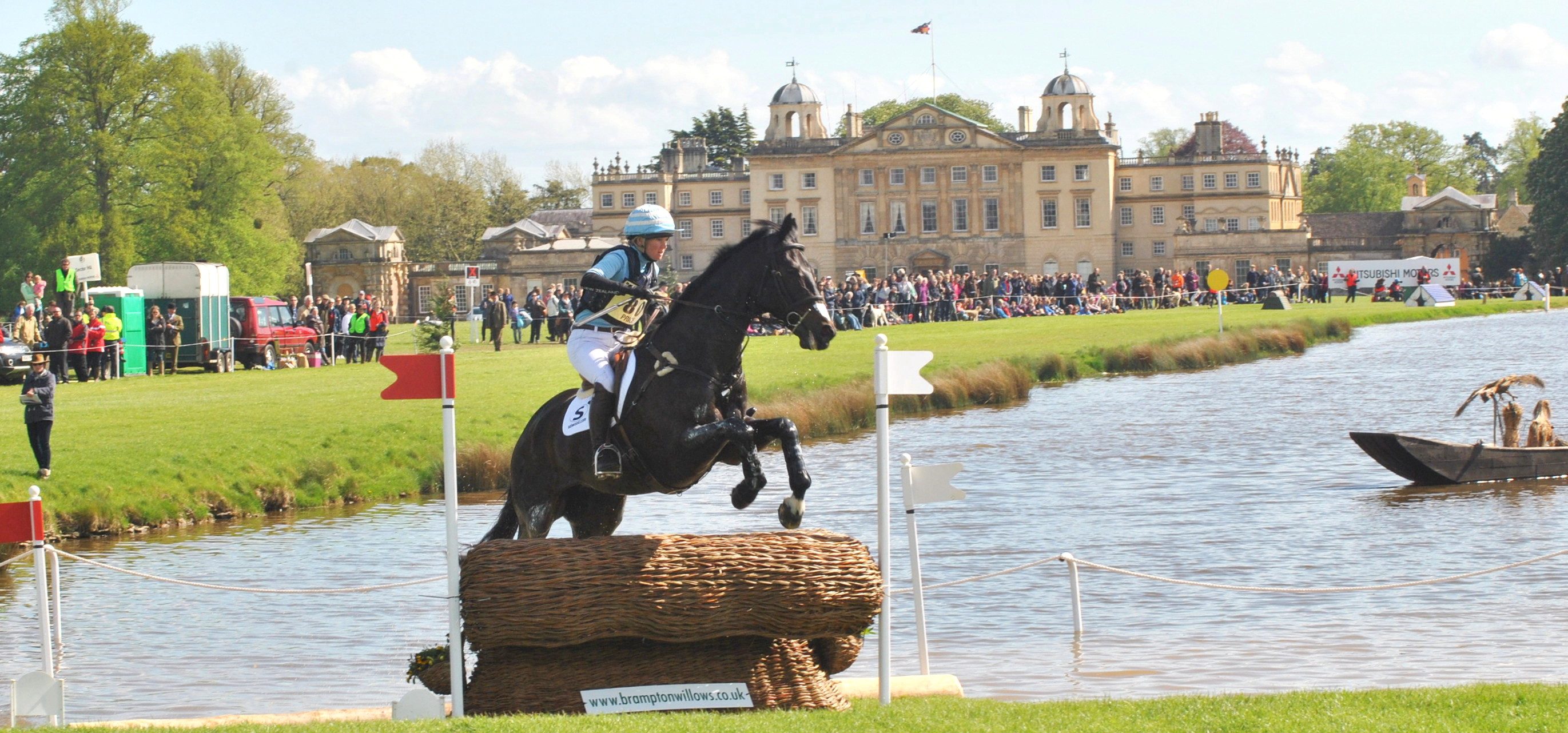
- Badminton Horse Trials 2015
- Begins: 6 May 2026
- Ends: 10 May 2026
- Frequency: Annually
- Location: Badminton Park
- Years active: 77
- Inaugurated: 1949
- Attendance: 180,000
- Organiser: Jane Tuckwell
- Website: badminton-horse.co.uk

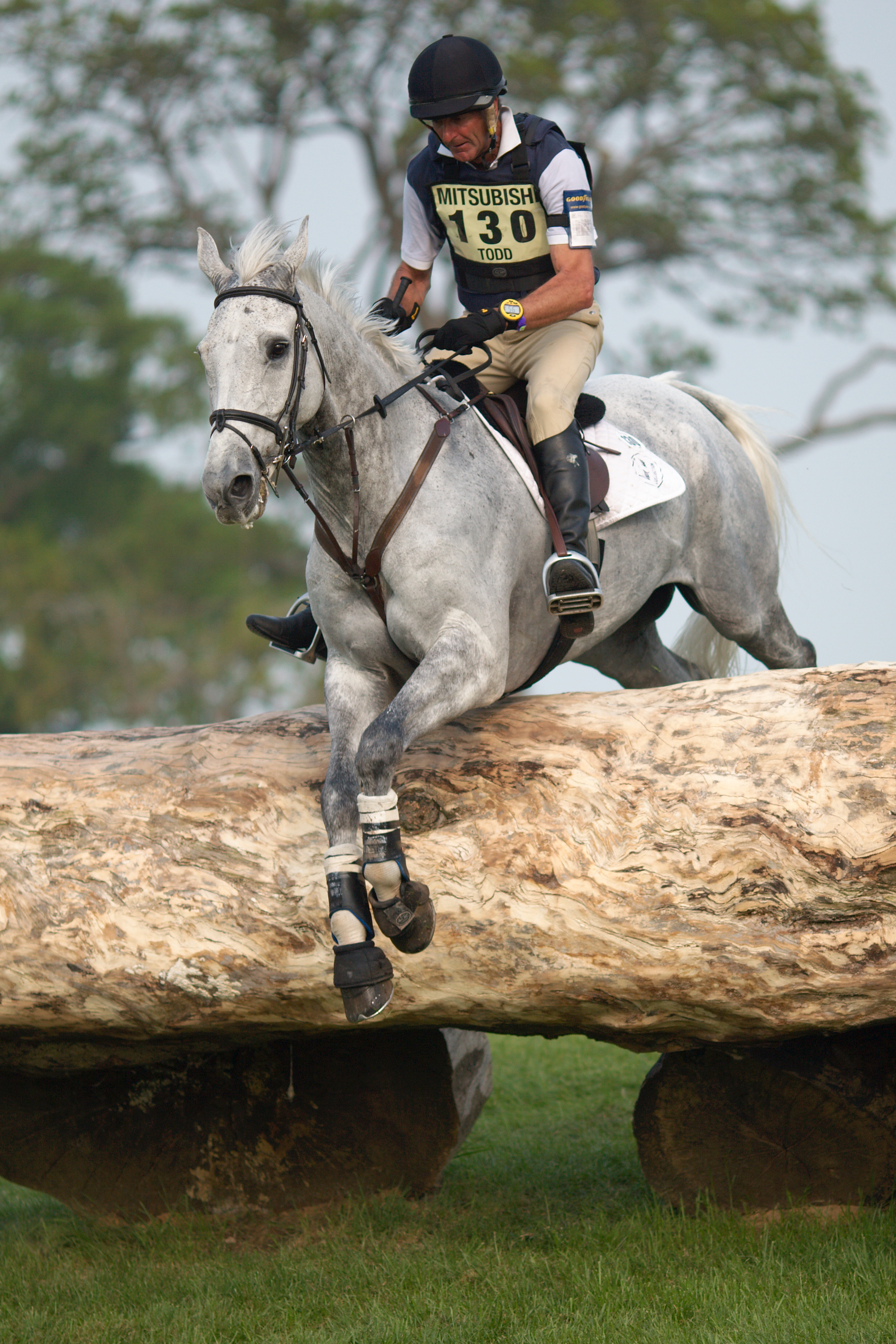
2011 winners Mark Todd and NZB Land Vision at the Quarry during the cross-country phase

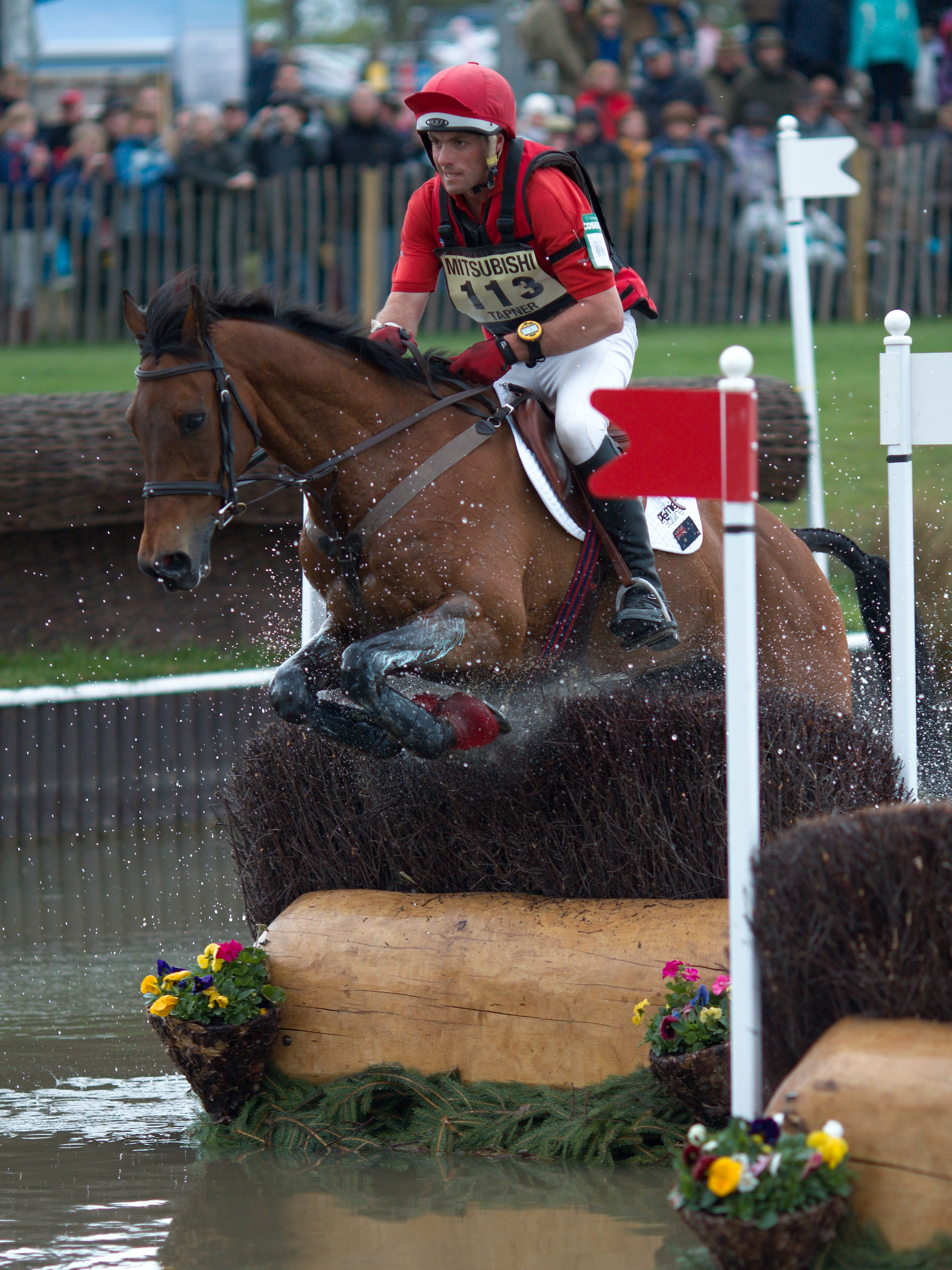
Paul Tapner and Inonothing, the winning combination at Badminton Horse Trials 2010, at The Lake during the cross-country phase

The Badminton Horse Trials is a five-day event, one of only seven annual Concours Complet International (CCI) Five Star events as classified by the Fédération Équestre Internationale (FEI). It takes place in May each year in the park of Badminton House, the seat of the Duke of Beaufort, in South Gloucestershire, England.

== History ==
Badminton was first held in 1949 by the 10th Duke of Beaufort in order to let British riders train for international events, and was advertised as "the most important horse event in Britain". It was the second three-day event held in Britain, with the first being its inspiration – the 1948 Summer Olympics. The first Badminton had 22 horses from Britain and Ireland start, and was won by Golden Willow. Eight of the 22 starters failed to complete the cross-country course. Badminton was the home of the first European Championship in 1953, won by Major Laurence Rook on Starlight XV. In 1955, Badminton moved to Windsor Castle for a year, at the invitation of the Queen, in order to hold the second European Championships. Badminton was first televised in 1956.

In 1959, Badminton was held in two sections, called the Great and Little Badminton, due to the popularity of the event and the number of entries. The horses in the two sections jumped the same fences, but were separated into the two divisions based on their money winnings. This graded approach was abandoned after the 1965 event. In 1989, the current director and course-designer Hugh Thomas, who rode in the 1976 Montreal Olympics, took over from Francis Weldon, a former winner, who is credited with bringing the event to the pinnacle it is at today.

Badminton is held in the six-square-kilometre (1,500-acre) grounds of the Badminton Estate in South Gloucestershire (UK), where the car parks, tradestands, arena and cross-country courses are located.

Badminton has been cancelled on several occasions. In 1966, 1975, 1987, 2001, 2012, 2020 and 2021 the event was cancelled completely, and in 1963 it was downgraded to a one-day event due to bad weather. In 2001 it was cancelled due to foot and mouth disease, in 2012 due to waterlogged ground, and in 2020 and 2021 due to the COVID-19 pandemic.

== Status ==
Together with the five-star rated Kentucky Three-Day Event and the Burghley Horse Trials, Badminton forms the Rolex Grand Slam of Eventing. Only two people have ever won the Grand Slam; Pippa Funnell in 2003 and Michael Jung in 2015/16. Australian Andrew Hoy nearly took the title in 2007 but lost it when he had a pole down at Burghley. The remaining CCI***** rated events are the Luhmühlen Horse Trials, the Australian International Three Day Event, the Stars of Pau and the Maryland Five Star at Fairhill.

The cross-country day at Badminton attracts crowds of up to a quarter of a million and is the second largest in the world for money made (after the Indianapolis 500).

== Winners ==
Year	Rider	Horse	Notes
1949	John Shedden (GBR)	Golden Willow	
1950	Tony Collins (GBR)	Remus	
1951	Hans Schwarzenbach (SUI)	Vae Victis	
1952	Mark Darley (GBR)	Emily Little	
1953	Laurence Rook (GBR)	Starlight	
1954	Margaret Hough (GBR)	Bambi V	
1955	Francis Weldon (GBR)	Kilbarry	Event held at Windsor
1956	Francis Weldon (GBR)	Kilbarry	
1957	Sheila Wilcox (GBR)	High and Mighty	
1958	Sheila Wilcox (GBR)	High and Mighty	
1959	Sheila Wilcox-Waddington (GBR)	Airs and Graces	Little Badminton
1959	Shelagh Kesler (GBR)	Double Diamond	
1960	Bill Roycroft (AUS)	Our Solo	
1960	Martin Whiteley (GBR)	Peggoty	Little Badminton
1961	Laurie Morgan (AUS)	Salad Days	
1961	Peter Welch (GBR)	Mr. Wilson	Little Badminton
1962	Anneli Drummond-Hay (GBR)	Merely-a-Monarch	
1962	Penny Crofts (GBR)	Priam	Little Badminton
1963	No Major Event		Event downgraded due to weather
1964	James Templer (GBR)	M'Lord Connolly	
1964	Sheila Waddington (GBR)	Glenamoy	Little Badminton
1965	Eddie Boylan (IRL)	Durlas Eile	
1965	Martin Whiteley (GBR)	The Poacher	Little Badminton
1966	No Event		Cancelled due to weather
1967	Celia Ross-Taylor (GBR)	Jonathan	
1968	Jane Bullen (GBR)	Our Nobby	
1969	Richard Walker (GBR)	Pasha	
1970	Richard Meade (GBR)	The Poacher	
1971	Mark Phillips (GBR)	Great Ovation	
1972	Mark Phillips (GBR)	Great Ovation	
1973	Lucinda Prior-Palmer (GBR)	Be Fair	
1974	Mark Phillips (GBR)	Columbus	
1975	No Event		Cancelled due to weather
1976	Lucinda Prior-Palmer (GBR)	Wide Awake	
1977	Lucinda Prior-Palmer	George	
1978	Jane Holderness-Roddam (GBR)	Warrior	
1979	Lucinda Prior-Palmer (GBR)	Killaire	
1980	Mark Todd (NZL)	Southern Comfort III	
1981	Mark Phillips (GBR)	Lincoln	
1982	Richard Meade (GBR)	Speculator III	
1983	Lucinda Green (GBR)	Regal Realm	
1984	Lucinda Green (GBR)	Beagle Bay	
1985	Ginny Holgate (GBR)	Priceless	
1986	Ian Stark (GBR)	Sir Wattie	
1987	No Event		Cancelled due to weather
1988	Ian Stark (GBR)	Sir Wattie	Also came second on Glenburnie
1989	Ginny Leng (GBR)	Master Craftsman	
1990	Nicola McIrvine (GBR)	Middle Road	
1991	Rodney Powell (GBR)	The Irishman II	
1992	Mary Thomson (GBR)	King William	
1993	Ginny Leng (GBR)	Welton Houdini	
1994	Mark Todd (NZL)	Horton Point	
1995	Bruce Davidson (USA)	Eagle Lion	
1996	Mark Todd (NZL)	Bertie Blunt	
1997	David O'Connor (USA)	Custom Made	
1998	Chris Bartle (GBR)	Word Perfect II	
1999	Ian Stark (GBR)	Jaybee	
2000	Mary King (GBR)	Star Appeal	
2001	No Event		Cancelled due to foot and mouth epidemic
2002	Pippa Funnell (GBR)	Supreme Rock	
2003	Pippa Funnell (GBR)	Supreme Rock	Won as the second leg of winning the Grand Slam of Eventing
2004	William Fox-Pitt (GBR)	Tamarillo	
2005	Pippa Funnell (GBR)	Primmore's Pride	
2006	Andrew Hoy (AUS)	Moonfleet	
2007	Lucinda Fredericks (AUS)	Headley Britannia	
2008	Nicolas Touzaint (FRA)	Hildago de L'Ile	
2009	Oliver Townend (GBR)	Flint Curtis	
2010	Paul Tapner (AUS)	Inonothing	
2011	Mark Todd (NZL)	NZB Land Vision	
2012	No Event		Cancelled due to weather
2013	Jonathan Paget (NZL)	Clifton Promise	
2014	Sam Griffiths (AUS)	Paulank Brockagh	
2015	William Fox-Pitt (GBR)	Chilli Morning	
2016	Michael Jung (GER)	La Biosthetique-Sam	Won as the final leg of winning the Grand Slam of Eventing
2017	Andrew Nicholson (NZL)	Nereo	
2018	Jonelle Price (NZL)	Classic Moet	
2019	Piggy French (GBR)	Vanir Kamira	First year of CCI5* designation
2020	No Event		Cancelled due to COVID-19 pandemic
2021	No Event		Cancelled due to COVID-19 pandemic
2022	Laura Collett (GBR)	London 52	
2023	Rosalind Canter (GBR)	Lordships Graffalo	
2024	Caroline Powell (NZL)	Greenacres Special Cavalier	
2025	Rosalind Canter (GBR)	Lordships Graffalo	
2026	Rosalind Canter (GBR)	Lordships Graffalo	

== Warnings and sanctions ==
Yellow Warning Cards are sanctions issued by the FEI to riders for abusive behavior, unsafe riding, or potentially dangerous practices such as excessively whipping a horse or pushing on with an exhausted horse. If a rider receives a second Yellow Warning Card within a year, they are suspended from competing in FEI sanctioned competitions for two months. More Yellow Warning Cards are issued in the sport of eventing than for other FEI sports.

Yellow Warning Cards issued at Badminton Horse Trials include:

- 2011: Jrina Giesswein (SUI) for dangerous riding - continuing after three clear refusals, a fall, or any form of elimination
- 2011: Stephanie Rhodes-Bosch (CAN) for dangerous riding - not following the instructions of the officials
- 2013: Manuel Grave (POR) for dangerous riding - pressing a tired horse
- 2016: Alice Dunsdon (GBR) for dangerous riding - continuing after three clear refusals, a fall, or any form of elimination
- 2017: Elisa Wallace (USA) for abuse of horse - riding an exhausted horse
- 2022: Mollie Summerland (GBR) for abuse of horse - excessive use of whip, bit and/or spurs
- 2022: Maxime Livio (FRA) for dangerous riding - pressing a tired horse; and one for incorrect behaviour the prior month
- 2023: Oliver Townend (GBR) for dangerous riding - series of dangerous jumps. After clipping a fence, rider was asked to pull up by the ground jury and was eliminated.
- 2024: Florian Ganneval (FRA) for dangerous riding - series of dangerous jumps

== Dangers ==
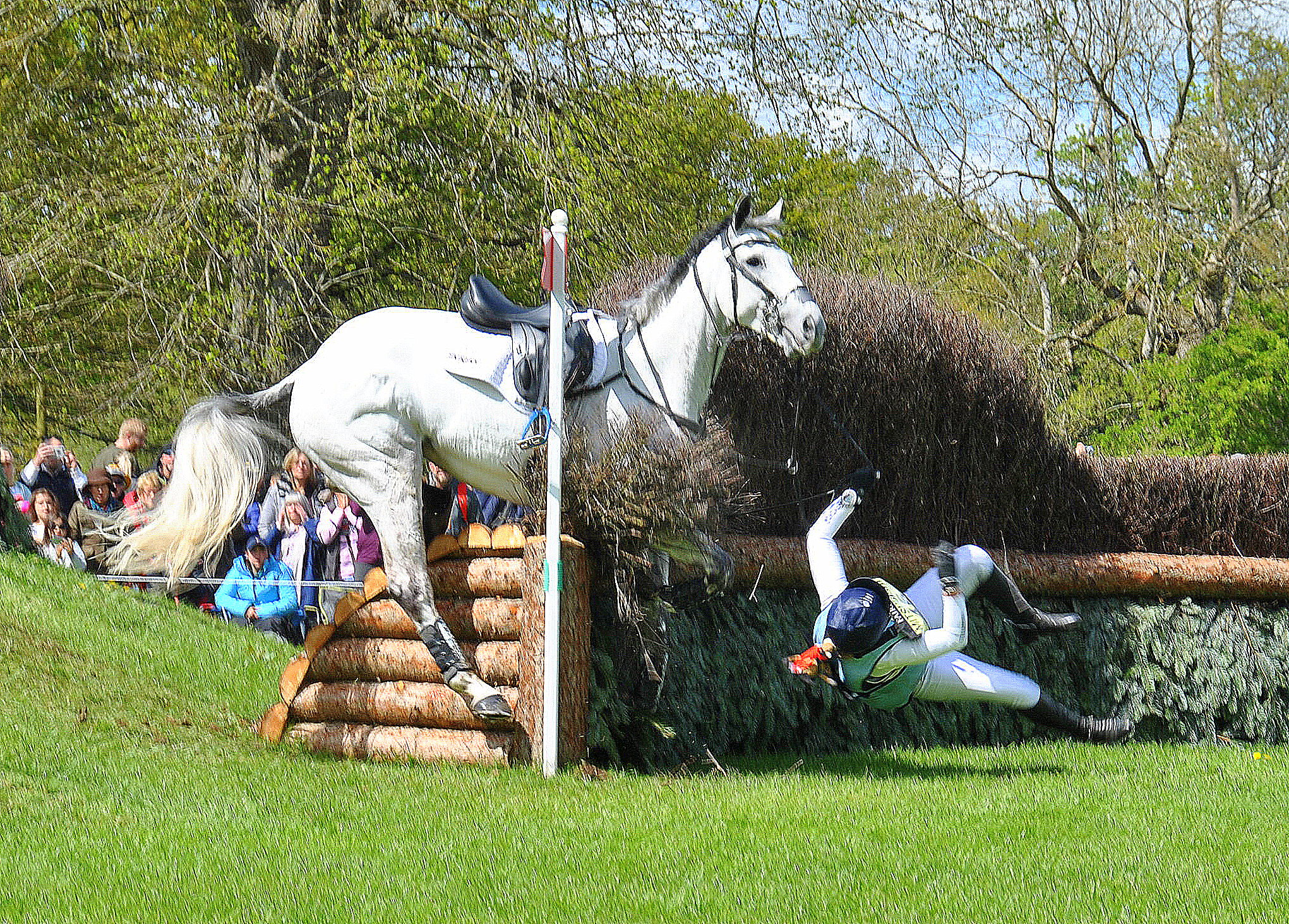
Kitty King (GBR) falls from Vendredi Biats during the 2019 Badminton Horse Trials

Eventing is considered one of the most dangerous of equestrian sports. In its history, there have been periods when there were many rider deaths. The FEI and advocates of the sport have been working to reduce the dangers including the use of protective equipment and redesigning jumps and courses to reduce falls and injuries to horses and riders.

An example of dangerous course conditions at Badminton happened in 2007 when after a long period without rain, the ground was considered to be too hard, resulting in 22 withdrawals. Another example was in 2011 when only seven out of 76 starters crossed the finish line without penalties on the cross country phase, and 11 riders fell.

Below are some of the serious injuries and fatalities that have happened at Badminton.

=== Rider injuries ===
- 2003: Anna Hassö (SWE) broke her pelvis and was airlifted to hospital after her horse Son of a Bitch fell on top of her into the water.
- 2008: Rider Dee Kennedy (GBR) was hospitalized for several days after falling from Big El during the cross-country portion of the event.
- 2011: Ingrid Klimke (GER) was hospitalized when she fell off of Butts Abraxxas at fence 24.
- 2011: Elizabeth Power (IRL) was hospitalized after she fell from her horse Kilpatrick River at fence 16, the Sunken Road, and was knocked unconscious. Power was airlifted to Bristol's Frenchay Hospital.
- 2017: Rider Emily Gilruth (UK) suffered a traumatic brain injury during a fall from her horse Topwood Beau during cross country.
- 2022: Rider Nicola Wilson (UK) suffered a traumatic spinal cord injury when she fell from JL Dublin during the cross country phase of the event. Initially paralyzed from the neck down, she spent four and a half months in hospital before returning home.

=== Horse casualties ===
- 1976: Wideawake ridden by Lucinda Green died of a heart attack on his victory lap.
- 1992: Face The Music ridden by Mark Todd (NZL) broke his leg in a fall and was subsequently put down.
- 1992: Briarlands Pippin ridden by William Fox-Pitt (GB) broke his back after a fall and was be euthanized.
- 1992: Mr. Maxwell ridden by Karen Lende (USA) was badly injured at obstacle 12 and was put down. Mr. Maxwell had been crowned "Horse Of The Year" in 1991 by USEA (United States Eventing Association).
- 1998: Last Of The Incas ridden by Erica Watson (GB) collapsed at the second-to-last obstacle and died of a suspected heart attack or massive internal bleeding. Last Of The Incas had won the "Best Mare"-prize at Badminton the year before.
- 2007: Skwal ridden by Andrew Downes died of a suspected heart attack in the finishing ring
- 2007: Icare d'Auzay ridden by Jean-Lou Bigot died after a fence flag marker pole pierced an artery.
- 2010: Desert Island ridden by Louisa Lockwood, euthanised after breaking a fetlock.
- 2011: Mandiba ridden by Karen O'Connor (USA) broke six ribs when he fell off the Outlander Bank during the cross country phase of the event, and went through a rehabilitation period for many months.
- 2017: Shanghai Joe ridden by Shane Rose (AUS) was euthanized after fracturing his shoulder. The horse fell at fence 19 during the cross country portion of the event, got up and galloped back to the stabling area, where he slipped and fell once more.
- 2018: Redpath Ransom ridden by Alexander Bragg was euthanized after suffering a major injury to a suspensory ligament during cross country, unrelated to a jump.
- 2023: WSF Carthago ridden by Fiona Kashel was euthanized after sustaining an injury incurred while falling on the cross country course.

=== Falls ===
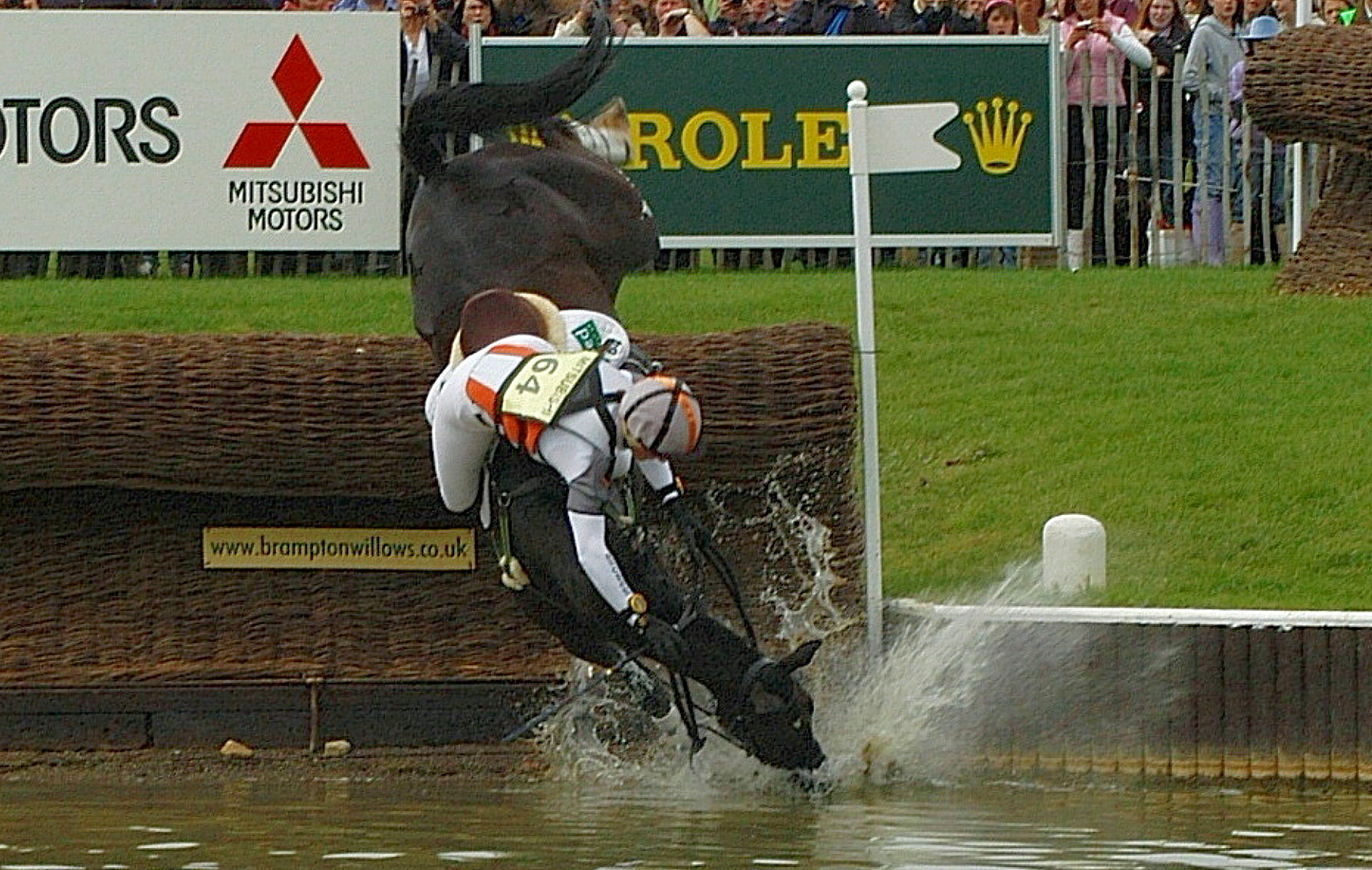
Ruth Edge of Great Britain and Muschamp Impala fall at the water jump in 2008

- 1982: HRH Princess Anne (GBR) and her horse Stevie B fell into the water at The Lake fence.
- 2008: Two horses fell during the cross-country portion of the event: Moonfleet ridden by Andrew Hoy (AUS) and Muschamp Impala ridden by Ruth Edge (GBR).
- 2011: Louise Skelton (GBR) and her horse Partly Pickled fell at fence 16, the Sunken Road; Oliver Townend (GBR) and his horse Ashdale Cruise Master both fell at fence 27.
- 2016: Dani Evans (GBR) and her horse Raphael II both fell at fence 21, the Vicarage Vee.
- 2023: Izzy Taylor (GBR) and Graf Cavalier fell at the KBIS brush, Kitty King (GBR) and Vendredi Biats fell at the giant log pile, and Caroline Clarke (GBR) fell off her horse Touch Too Much at fence 11.
