= 2011 European Eventing Championship =

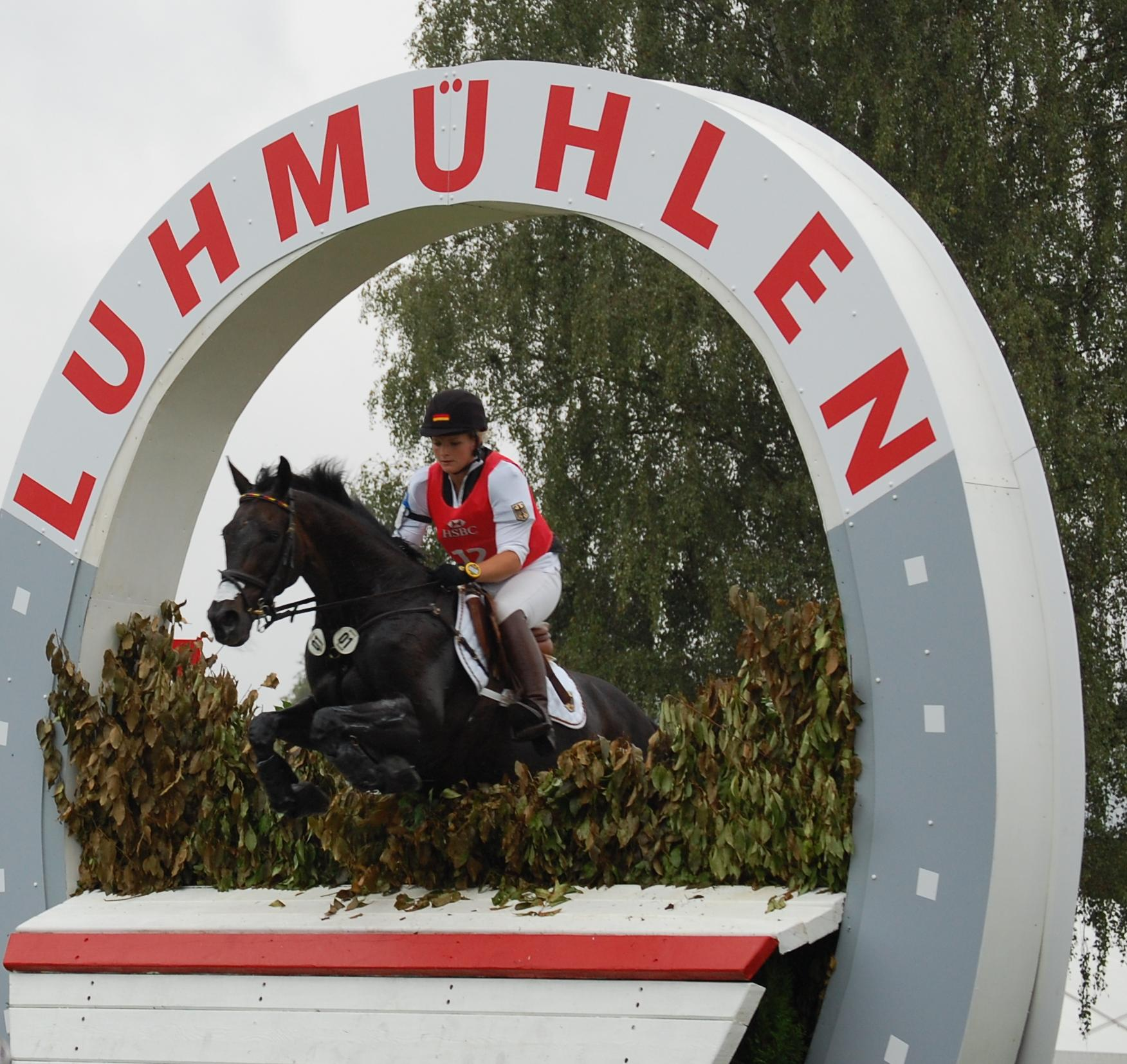
European Eventing Championships in Luhmühlen

The 2011 European Eventing Championship was held from August 25 to August 28, 2011 in Luhmühlen, borough of the Samtgemeinde Salzhausen in Lower Saxony, Germany.

It was the 30th edition of the European Eventing Championships, first time held 1953 at Badminton House.

== Organization ==
=== Before the event ===
At the 2008 FEI-General Assembly in Buenos Aires, Argentina, Germany was chosen as the country to host the 2011 European Eventing Championship. Luhmühlen, location of the Luhmühlen Horse Trials, was chosen as the location for the event.

Luhmühlen had held the European Eventing Championships already in the years 1975, 1979, 1987 and 1999.

=== Event and location ===
The European Eventing Championship was opened at the afternoon of Wednesday (August 24, 2011) with the opening ceremony “Ritte des Jahrhunderts” (rides of the century). Also on Wednesday the first horse inspection was held. The sport at the Championship had started on Thursday. On Sunday (August 28, 2011) the event ended with the medal ceremony.

The event was held at the eventing course in the “Westergellerser Heide” near Luhmühlen. Before the 2011 Luhmühlen Horse Trials, two months before the European Championship, the show ground of the course was completely rebuilt.

The main sponsor of the Championship was HSBC. Patroness of the event was German federal minister Ursula von der Leyen.

== Competitions ==
=== General ===
Unmodified since the first European Eventing Championship (with the exception of the European Championship 1997) two medal rankings are held at the Championships: the individual and the team medal ranking.

Since 2005 the European Championships are held as long format three-day event in the new format without steeplechase: dressage, cross country and show jumping.

Eleven teams and also individual riders started at the 2011 European Eventing Championship, in total 70 riders with their horses started. All teams could start with four riders, also each nation could start two extra individual riders. Germany as host nation could start with one team and eight extra individual riders.

=== Timetable ===
The first part of the competition was the dressage phase, held on Wednesday and on Friday (August 25 and 26, 2011). Before the riders participate at the Championship, a test rider ("guinea pig") rides to test the systems. This task is performed by German eventing rider Anna Siemer with her horse Charlott.

The second part was the cross country phase on Saturday. The jumping phase, last part of the event, was held on Sunday. The competition was held each day from morning to afternoon.

== Results ==
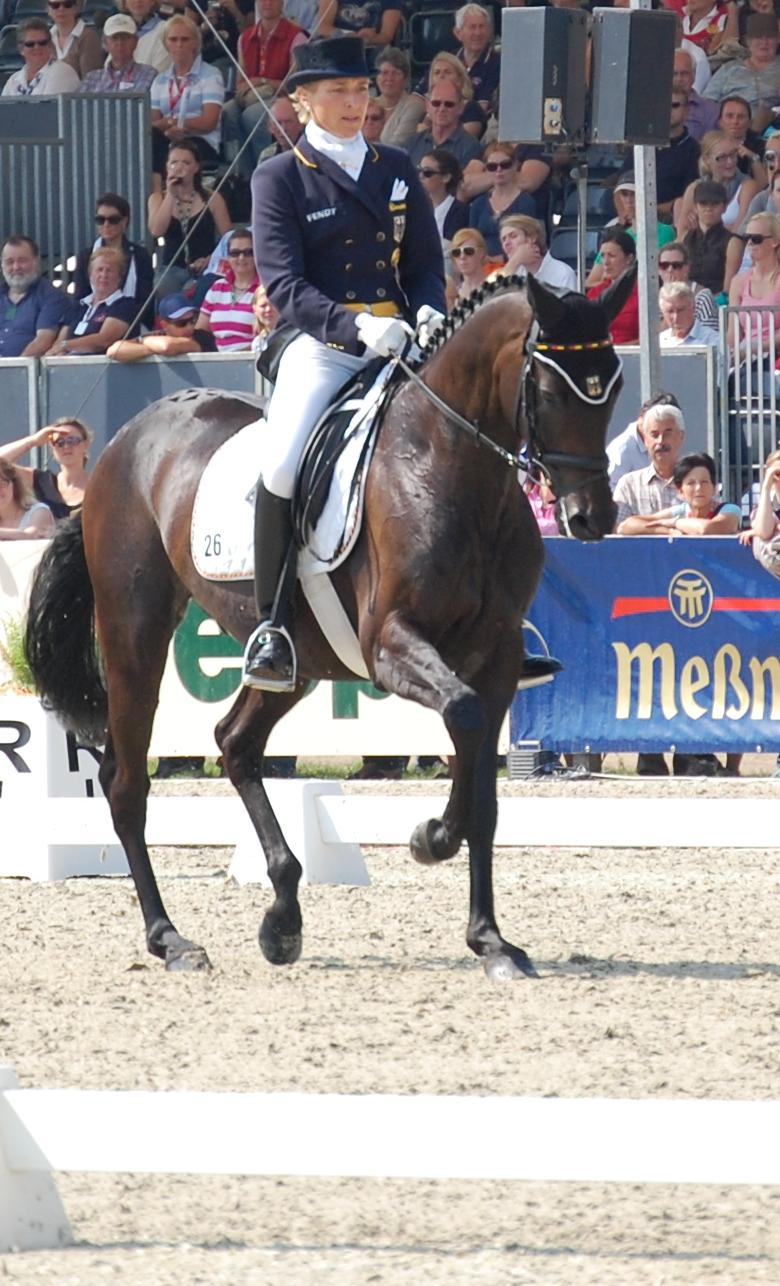
Most successful pair of the dressage: Ingrid Klimke and FRH Butts Abraxxas

=== Provisional result after dressage ===
In the dressage phase Germany was the most successful team. The German team get a team result of 98.70 penalty points - the best dressage result in eventing history.

An important contribution to this result came from Ingrid Klimke with FRH Butts Abraxxas. With a dressage result of 80.00% (annualised 30.00 penalty points) Klimke get her best ever eventing dressage result. With this result she was the leader of the individual ranking after dressage.

Individual ranking:

rank	rider	horse	penalty points (percent)
1	(Germany) Ingrid Klimke	FRH Butts Abraxxas	30.00 (80.00%)
2	(Germany) Michael Jung	Sam FBW	33.30 (77.82%)
3	(Germany) Frank Ostholt	Little Paint	34.00 (77.31%)
4	(Germany) Sandra Auffarth	Opgun Louvo	35.40 (76.41%)
4	(United Kingdom) Laura Collett	Rayef	35.40 (76.41%)

Team ranking:

rank	team	rider and horse	penalty points
1	Germany	Ingrid Klimke; FRH Butts Abraxxas; Michael Jung; Sam FBW; Sandra Auffarth; Opgun Louvo; Andreas Dibowski; FRH Fantasia	98.70; 30.00 33.30 35.40 (43.80)
2	Great Britain	Mary King; Imperial Cavalier; Piggy French; Jakata; William Fox-Pitt; Cool Mountain; Nicola Wilson; Opposition Buzz	121.90; 38.80 40.40 42.70 (52.70)
3	Italy	Stefano Brecciaroli; Apollo van de Wendi Kurt Hoeve; Susanna Bordone; Carrera; Marco Biasia; Tatchou; Fabio Magni; Southern King V	128.30; 35.80 42.70 49.80 (56.40)

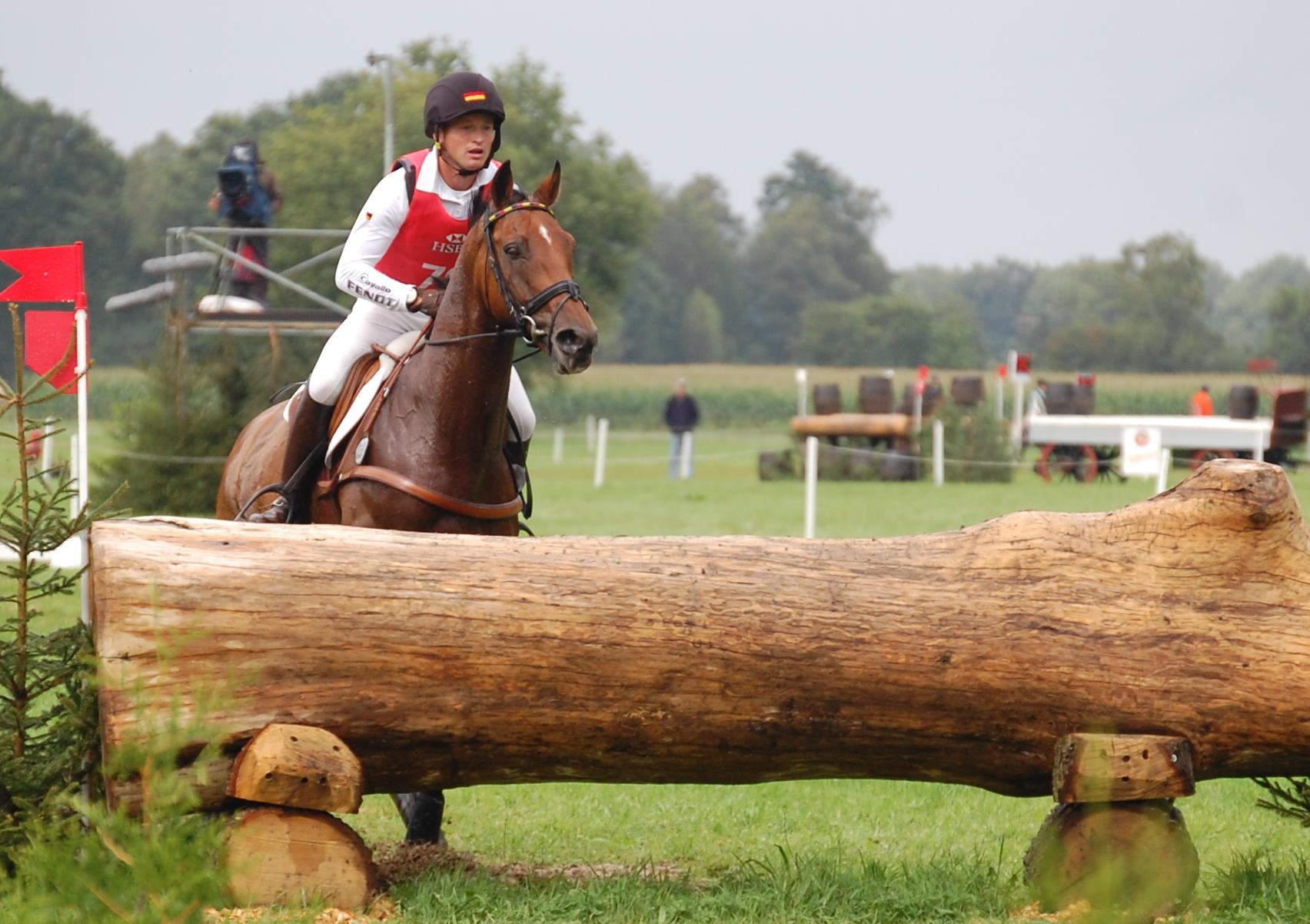
without faults in the cross country: Michael Jung and Sam FBW

=== Provisional result after cross country ===
The cross country day was rainy. The course, built by Mark Phillips was a challenging, but solvable task for the riders: two riders retired at the cross country day, eleven riders was eliminated at the cross country. The Belgian team consisted only of two riders after the cross country and was so no more complete team.

After cross country Germany was still in the lead - despite the fall of their team rider Andreas Dibowski.

Individual ranking:

rank	rider	horse	penalty points
rank	rider	horse	dressage	cross country	provisional result
1	(Germany) Ingrid Klimke	FRH Butts Abraxxas	30.00	0.00	30.00
2	(Germany) Michael Jung	Sam FBW	33.30	0.00	33.30
3	(Sweden) Sara Algotsson-Ostholt	Wega	36.00	0.00	36.00
4	(Germany) Sandra Auffarth	Opgun Louvo	35.40	1.60	37.00
5	(Germany) Frank Ostholt	Little Paint	34.00	6.00	40.00

Team ranking:

rank	rider	rider and horse	penalty points
rank	rider	rider and horse	dressage	cross country	total
1	Germany	Ingrid Klimke; FRH Butts Abraxxas; Michael Jung; Sam FBW; Sandra Auffarth; Opgun Louvo; Andreas Dibowski; FRH Fantasia	30.00 33.30 35.40 43.80	0.00 0.00 1.60 eliminated	100.30; 30.00 33.30 37.00 (eliminated)
2	Great Britain	Mary King; Imperial Cavalier; Piggy French; Jakata; William Fox-Pitt; Cool Mountain; Nicola Wilson; Opposition Buzz	38.80 40.40 42.70 52.70	eliminated 6.80 0.00 0.00	142,60 (eliminated) 47.20 42.70 52.70
3	France	Donatien Schauly; Ocarina du Chanois; Nicolas Touzaint; Neptune de Sartene; Stanislas de Zuchowicz; Quirinal de la Bastide; Pascal Leroy; Minos de Petra	45.60 37.90 55.60 53.10	0.00 9.20 2.80 eliminated	151.10; 45.60 47.10 58.40 (eliminated)

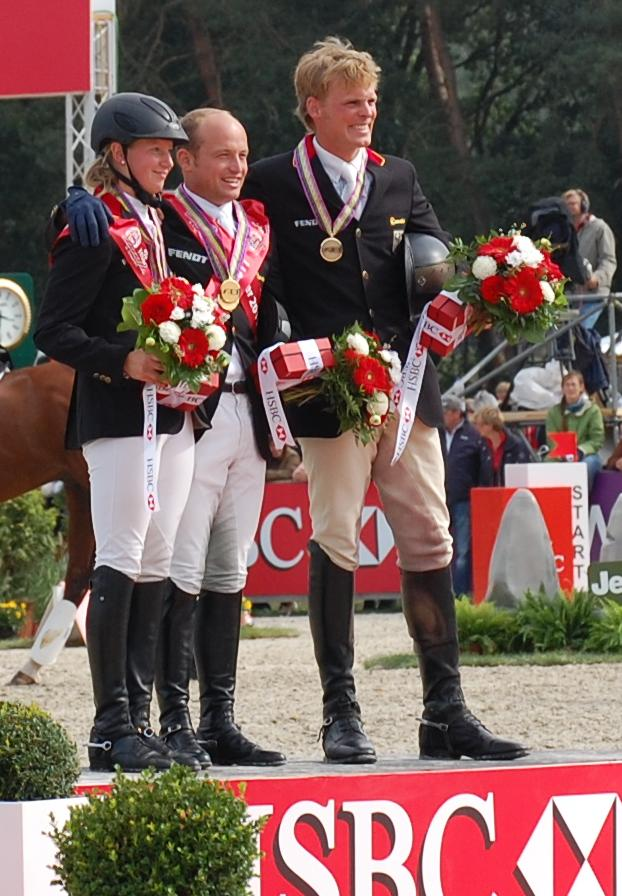
medal ceremony in the individual competition

=== Final result ===
After the cross country phase, on Sunday morning, the second horse inspection was held. Here the horses of a Spanish and of a Polish team rider were deemed "not fit to compete", so they were eliminated. Because of this the Polish team now consisted only of two riders - not a complete team.

Much changes in the individual ranking result from the show jumping phase. Again the German team was successful, team riders Sandra Auffarth and Michael Jung was clear in the show jumping course. As last rider in the competition Ingrid Klimke start in show jumping phase. Her horse Abraxxas, who had often faults in show jumping in the past - had six time knocked a rail down in this show jumping course. Klimke, now eleventh in the final ranking, comment time with the words "Sechs um - so schlecht ist er noch nie gesprungen" (six down - so bad he had never jumped before).

German rider Michael Jung benefited from this. He hold his result form the dressage phase the whole competition, so he won the individual gold medal. Jung is now the third (after Virginia Leng and Zara Phillips) who is the current world and European eventing champion at the same time. The German team was because of the large gap of penalty points also after the show jumping phase in the lead. So Germany win the 2011 European Eventing team gold medal.

Rank two and three in the final individual ranking are also German eventing riders: young Sandra Auffarth won at their first senior championship individual silver. Bronze was won by Frank Ostholt - he benefited by a refusal of the horse of his wife Sara Algotsson-Ostholt in show jumping.

The riders of the British team all had one obstacle fault in the show jumping phase, so they lost the second place in team ranking. The French team rider had all one faults here, so they won team silver.

==== Final individual result ====
rank	rider	horse	penalty points
rank	rider	horse	dressage	cross country	show jumping	total
1	(Germany) Michael Jung	Sam FBW	33.30	0.00	0.00	33.30
2	(Germany) Sandra Auffarth	Opgun Louvo	35.40	1.60	0.00	37.00
3	(Germany) Frank Ostholt	Little Paint	34.00	6.00	0.00	40.00
4	(Germany) Dirk Schrade	King Artus	36.70	6.00	0.00	42.70
5	(Italy) Stefano Brecciaroli	Apollo van de Wendi Kurt Hoeve	35.80	9.20	0.00	45.00
6	(France) Donatien Schauly	Ocarina du Chanois	45.60	0.00	0.00	45.60
7	(United Kingdom) William Fox-Pitt	Cool Mountain	42.70	0.00	4.00	46.70
8	(France) Nicolas Touzaint	Neptune de Sartene	37,90	9.20	0.00	47.10

==== Final team result ====
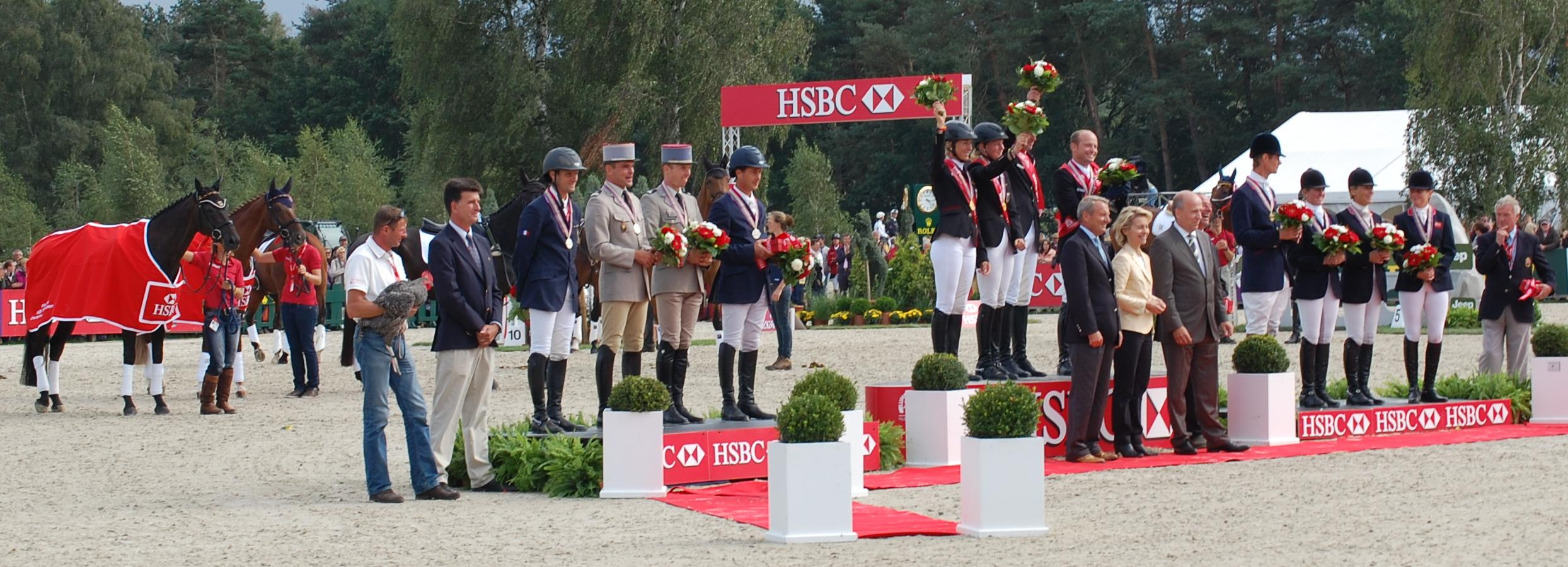
team medal ceremony

rank	team	rider and horse	penalty points
rank	team	rider and horse	dressage	cross country	show jumping	total
1	Germany	Ingrid Klimke; FRH Butts Abraxxas; Michael Jung; Sam FBW; Sandra Auffarth; Opgun Louvo; Andreas Dibowski; FRH Fantasia	30.00 33.30 35.40 43.80	0.00 0.00 1.60 eliminated	24.00 0.00 0.00	124.30; 54.00 33.30 37.00 (eliminated)
2	France	Donatien Schauly; Ocarina du Chanois; Nicolas Touzaint; Neptune de Sartene; Stanislas de Zuchowicz; Quirinal de la Bastide; Pascal Leroy; Minos de Petra	45.60 37.90 55.60 53.10	0.00 9.20 2.80 eliminated	0.00 0.00 0.00	151.10; 45.60 47.10 58.40 (eliminated)
3	Great Britain	Mary King; Imperial Cavalier; Piggy French; Jakata; William Fox-Pitt; Cool Mountain; Nicola Wilson; Opposition Buzz	38.80 40.40 42.70 52.70	eliminated 6.80 0.00 0.00	4.00 4.00 4.00	154.60 (eliminated) 51.20 46.70 56.70
4	Sweden	Sara Algotsson-Ostholt; Wega; Malin Petersen; Piccadilly Z Dag Albert; Mitras Eminen; Niklas Jonsson; First Lady	36.00 52.30 61.70 40,40	0.00 10.80 12.40 100,00	18.00 8.00 0.00 did not start	199.20; 54.00 71.10 74.10 (retired)
5	Ireland	Joseph Murphy; Electric Cruise; Mark Kyle; Coolio; Sam Watson; Bushman; Jayne Doherty; The Only One	57.70 60.40 50.20 51.00	3.20 0.00 25.20 44.80	0.00 4.00 6.00 0.00	151.10; 45.60 47.10 58.40 (eliminated)
