= Nicola Wilson =

British equestrian

Nicola Wilson MBE
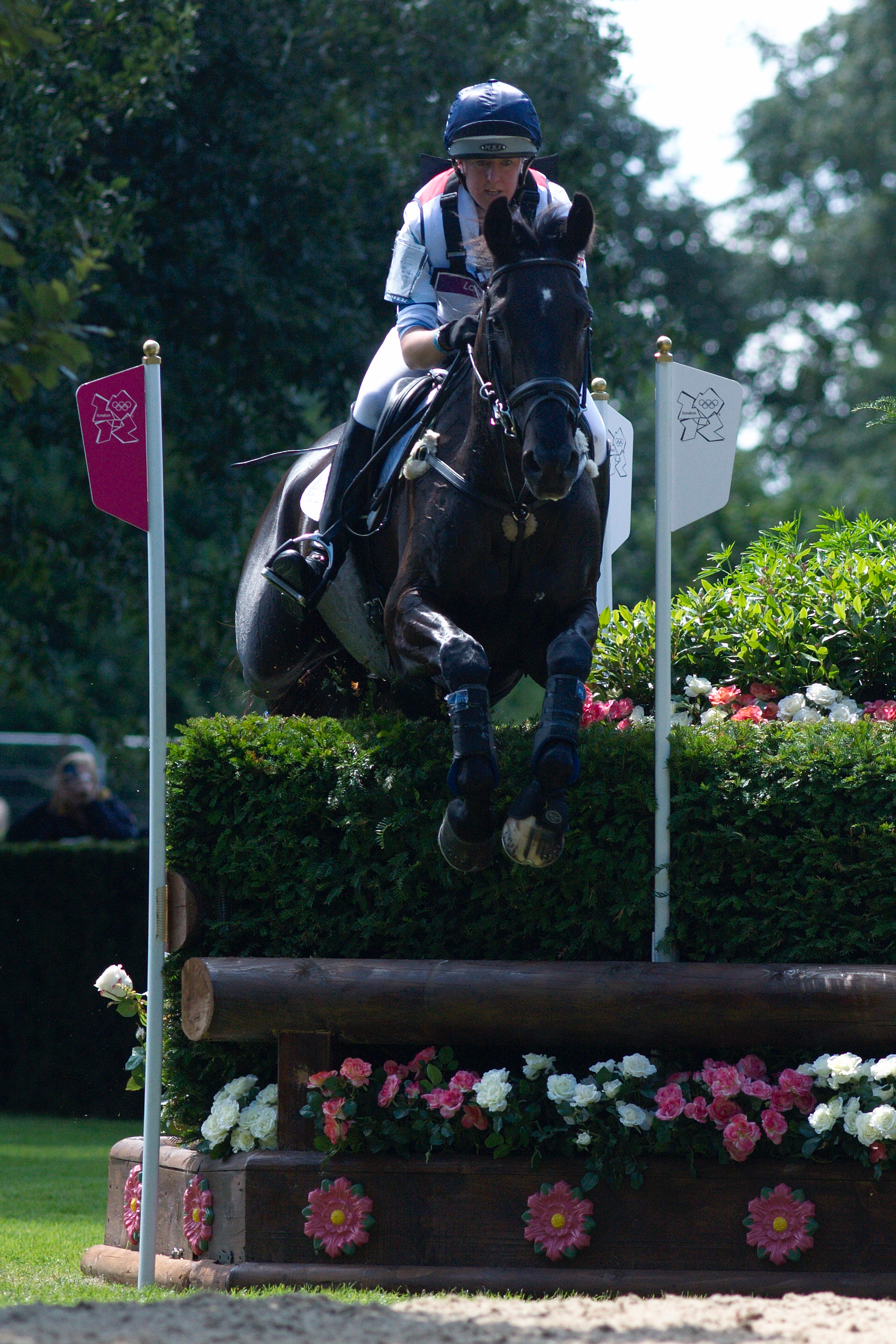
- Wilson and Opposition Buzz competing at the 2012 Summer Olympics in London

Personal information
- Nationality: English
- Born: Nicola Tweddle Darlington, England
- Height: 1.77 m (5 ft 9 1/2 in)

Sport
- Country: United Kingdom
- Sport: Equestrian
Medal record
Equestrian
Representing Great Britain
Olympic Games
Silver medal – second place	2012 London	Team Eventing
World Equestrian Games
Gold medal – first place	2010 Kentucky	Team Eventing
European Championships
Gold medal – first place	2009 Fontainebleau	Team eventing
Gold medal – first place	2017 Strzegom	Team eventing
Gold medal – first place	2021 Avenches	Team eventing
Gold medal – first place	2021 Avenches	Individual eventing
Silver medal – second place	2015 Blair Castle	Team eventing
Bronze medal – third place	2011 Luhmühlen	Team eventing
Bronze medal – third place	2017 Strzegom	Individual eventing

Nicola Wilson (née Tweddle; born 1 October 1976) is a British equestrian rider specialising in three-day eventing. Riding Opposition Buzz, she won a team gold at the 2010 FEI World Equestrian Games and team silver at the 2012 Olympic Games. She is also a seven-time medallist at the European Championships, including team golds in 2009, 2017 and 2021 and individual gold and bronze in 2021 and 2017, respectively.

== Early life ==
Born in Darlington, Wilson was given her first pony when she was three years old and later joined Hurworth Pony Club, where she competed in various pony club events and later became a member of the Bedale Hunt. Wilson studied for a degree in Sport and Business Management at Manchester University, and graduated with a 2:1 in 1999.

== Career ==
Wilson first competed internationally at the 1997 Young Rider European Championships, where she rode Mr Bumble. Riding the same horse she finished in 10th place at the 2008 Burghley Horse Trials. In 2007, she began competing on Opposition Buzz, a horse owned by Rosemary Search.

She won a gold medal as part of the British eventing team at the 2009 European Eventing Championships in Fontainebleau, France; she finished ninth in the individual event with 64.7 faults. Alongside William Fox-Pitt, Mary King and Tina Cook, Wilson was part of the British team that won the team eventing gold medal at the 2010 FEI World Equestrian Games held at the Kentucky Horse Park in Lexington, United States; Wilson rode a clear round in the show jumping meaning teammate, and individual silver medallist Fox-Pitt could have afforded three fences down and Britain would still have won team gold. Wilson and Opposition Buzz finished 16th overall in the individual competition.

At the 2011 Badminton Horse Trials, Wilson, riding Opposition Buzz, was the leading British rider, and in third place overall, heading into the last day of competition. During the show jumping phase she knocked down a fence and eventually finished seventh in a competition won by Mark Todd. She won a bronze medal at the 2011 European Eventing Championships as the British side finished behind Germany and France.

Wilson was initially selected as a reserve rider for Great Britain at the 2012 Summer Olympics but was added to the squad for the individual and team eventing when Piggy French withdrew after her horse DHI Topper W suffered an injury. Wilson's horse for the Games was Opposition Buzz. The events were held at Greenwich Park between 28 and 31 July.

== CCI 5* Results ==
Results
Event	Kentucky	Badminton	Luhmühlen	Burghley	Pau	Adelaide
2003		27th (Skiver)				
2004		20th (Skiver)				
2005		RET (Skiver)	9th (Skiver)	WD (Skiver) WD (Highland Loch II)		
2006	Did not participate					
2007		16th (Opposition Buzz)		15th (Opposition Buzz)		
2008		7th (Opposition Buzz)		5th (Opposition Buzz)		
2009	11th (Opposition Buzz)		EL (Oingy Boingy)			
2010		8th (Opposition Buzz)		30th (Master Banks)		
2011		7th (Opposition Buzz)RET (Bee Diplomatic)			18th (Bee Diplomatic)	
2012	Did not participate					
2013		30th (Opposition Buzz)	EL (Opposition Buzz)	10th (Opposition Buzz)		
2014		WD (Beltane Queen)WD (Annie Clover)			8th (One Two Many)	
2015	8th (Annie Clover)26th (Watermill Vision)	7th (One Two Many)19th (Beltane Queen)		EL (Annie Clover)		
2016		RET (One Two Many)			4th (One Two Many)8th (Annie Clover)	
2017		RET (Annie Clover)	(silver) (Bulana)			
2018			RET (Bulana)			
2019		21st (Bulana)				
EL = Eliminated; RET = Retired; WD = Withdrew

== International Championship results ==
Results
Year	Event	Horse	Placing	Notes
2009	European Championships	Opposition Buzz	1st place, gold medalist(s)	Team
2009	European Championships	Opposition Buzz	9th	Individual
2010	World Young Horse Championships	Annie Clover	2nd place, silver medalist(s)	CCI*
2010	World Young Horse Championships	Inde	23rd	CCI**
2010	World Equestrian Games	Opposition Buzz	1st place, gold medalist(s)	Team
2010	World Equestrian Games	Opposition Buzz	15th	Individual
2011	World Young Horse Championships	Annie Clover	5th	CCI**
2011	European Championships	Opposition Buzz	3rd place, bronze medalist(s)	Team
2011	European Championships	Opposition Buzz	16th	Individual
2012	Olympic Games	Opposition Buzz	2nd place, silver medalist(s)	Team
2012	Olympic Games	Opposition Buzz	28th	Individual
2014	World Equestrian Games	Annie Clover	24th	Individual
2015	European Championships	One Two Many	2nd place, silver medalist(s)	Team
2015	European Championships	One Two Many	27th	Individual
2017	European Championships	Bulana	1st place, gold medalist(s)	Team
2017	European Championships	Bulana	3rd place, bronze medalist(s)	Individual
EL = Eliminated; RET = Retired; WD = Withdrew

== Notable horses ==
- Opposition Buzz - 1997 Dark Bay Trakehner Cross Gelding (Fleetwater Opposition x Java Tiger)
  - 2009 European Championships - Team Gold Medal, Individual Ninth Place
  - 2010 World Equestrian Games - Team Gold Medal, Individual 15th Place
  - 2011 European Championships - Team Bronze Medal, Individual 16th Place
  - 2012 London Olympics - Team Silver Medal, Individual 28th Place
- Annie Clover - 2004 Brown Irish Sport Horse Mare (Newmarket Venture x Clover Hill)
  - 2014 World Equestrian Games - Individual 24th Place
- One Two Many - 2002 Bay Irish Sport Horse Gelding (Chacoa x Colin Diamond)
  - 2015 European Championships - Team Silver Medal, Individual 27th Place
- Bulana - 2006 Black Dutch Warmblood Mare (Tygo x Furore)
  - 2017 European Championships - Team Gold Medal, Individual Bronze Medal
