= Equestrian at the 2012 Summer Olympics – Individual eventing =

Individual eventing at the Games of the XXX Olympiad
- Venue: Greenwich Park
- Date: 28–31 July 2012
- Competitors: 74 from 22 nations

Medalists
1st place, gold medalist(s)		Michael Jung	Germany
2nd place, silver medalist(s)		Sara Algotsson Ostholt	Sweden
3rd place, bronze medalist(s)		Sandra Auffarth	Germany

The individual eventing in equestrian at the 2012 Olympic Games in London was held at Greenwich Park from 28 to 31 July. Michael Jung of Germany won the gold medal. Sweden's Sara Algotsson Ostholt won silver and Sandra Auffarth, also of Germany, took bronze.

== Competition format ==
The team and individual eventing competitions used the same scores. Eventing consisted of a dressage test, a cross-country test, and a jumping test. The jumping test had two rounds. After the first jumping round, the teams results were determined. Both jumping rounds counted towards the individual results. Only the top 25 horse and rider pairs (including ties for 25th) after the first jumping round (adding the three components) competed in the second jumping round. However, each nation was limited to a maximum of three pairs qualifying for the second (final) jumping round. The format used in London, was the same as the one used in both Athens and Beijing.

The cross-country course was 5,728 meters long, with 28 obstacles and 40 efforts. The allowed time was set at 10:03 for an average speed of 570m/min. The jumping course was 515m with an allowed time of 1:23.

== Schedule ==
All times are British Summer Time (UTC+1)

Date	Time	Round
Saturday, 28 July 2012; Sunday, 29 July 2012	10:00	Dressage
Monday, 30 July 2012	12:30	Cross-country
Tuesday 31 July 2012	10:30	Jumping qualification and final jumping

== Results ==
=== Standings after dressage ===
Rank	Rider	Horse	Nation	Dressage	Total
1	Yoshiaki Oiwa	Noonday de Conde	Japan	38.10	38.10
2	Stefano Brecciaroli	Apollo WD Wendi Kurt Hoev	Italy	38.50	38.50
3	Mark Todd	Campino	New Zealand	39.10	39.10
4	Ingrid Klimke	Butts Abraxxas	Germany	39.30	39.30
4	Sara Algotsson Ostholt	Wega	Sweden	39.30	39.30
6	Dirk Schrade	King Artus	Germany	39.80	39.80
7	Lucinda Fredericks	Flying Finish	Australia	40.00	40.00
7	Sandra Auffarth	Opgun Louvo	Germany	40.00	40.00
7	Karin Donckers	Gazelle de la Brasserie	Belgium	40.00	40.00
10	Clayton Fredericks	Bendigo	Australia	40.40	40.40
11	Michael Jung	Sam	Germany	40.60	40.60
12	Mary King	Imperial Cavalier	Great Britain	40.90	40.90
13	Andrew Hoy	Rutherglen	Australia	41.70	41.70
14	Kristina Cook	Miners Frolic	Great Britain	42.00	42.00
15	Kenki Sato	Chippieh	Japan	42.20	42.20
16	Ludvig Svennerstål	Shamwari	Sweden	43.70	43.70
17	Jonathan Paget	Clifton Promise	New Zealand	44.10	44.10
17	William Fox-Pitt	Lionheart	Great Britain	44.10	44.10
19	Phillip Dutton	Mystery Whisper	United States	44.30	44.30
20	Donatien Schauly	Ocarina du Chanois	France	44.40	44.40
21	Andrew Nicholson	Nereo	New Zealand	45.00	45.00
22	Niklas Lindbäck	Mister Pooh	Sweden	45.20	45.20
23	Sam Griffiths	Happy Times	Australia	45.40	45.40
24	Christopher Burton	HP Leilani	Australia	46.10	46.10
24	Zara Phillips	High Kingdom	Great Britain	46.10	46.10
26	William Coleman	Twizzel	United States	46.30	46.30
27	Camilla Speirs	Portersize Just A Jiff	Ireland	47.60	47.60
27	Nicolas Touzaint	Hildago de L'Ile	France	47.60	47.60
29	Karen O'Connor	Mr Medicott	United States	48.20	48.20
30	Virginie Caulier	Nepal du Sudre	Belgium	48.30	48.30
31	Hawley Bennett-Awad	Gin & Juice	Canada	48.70	48.70
32	Aoife Clark	Master Crusoe	Ireland	48.90	48.90
33	Atsushi Negishi	Pretty Darling	Japan	50.40	50.40
34	Andrew Heffernan	Millthyne Corolla	Netherlands	50.60	50.60
34	Rebecca Howard	Riddle Master	Canada	50.60	50.60
36	Boyd Martin	Otis Barbotiere	United States	50.70	50.70
36	Marc Rigouts	Dunkas	Belgium	50.70	50.70
38	Lionel Guyon	Nemetis de Lalou	France	50.90	50.90
39	Nicola Wilson	Opposition Buzz	Great Britain	51.70	51.70
39	Tim Lips	Oncarlos	Netherlands	51.70	51.70
41	Joris Vanspringel	Lully des Aulnes	Belgium	51.90	51.90
42	Tiana Coudray	Ringwood Magister	United States	52.00	52.00
43	Caroline Powell	Lenamore	New Zealand	52.20	52.20
43	Elaine Pen	Vira	Netherlands	52.20	52.20
45	Carl Bouckaert	Cyrano Z	Belgium	53.00	53.00
46	Ronald Zabala-Goetschel	Master Rose	Ecuador	53.30	53.30
47	Vittoria Panizzon	Borough Pennyz	Italy	53.50	53.50
48	Nina Ligon	Butts Leon	Thailand	53.90	53.90
48	Ruy Fonseca	Tom Bombadill Too	Brazil	53.90	53.90
50	Jessica Phoenix	Exponential	Canada	54.80	54.80
50	Pawel Spisak	Wag	Poland	54.80	54.80
52	Toshiyuki Tanaka	Marquis de Plescop	Japan	55.00	55.00
53	Joseph Murphy	Electric Cruise	Ireland	55.60	55.60
54	Aurelien Kahn	Cadiz	France	55.90	55.90
55	Jonelle Richards	Flintstar	New Zealand	56.70	56.70
56	Michelle Mueller	Amistad	Canada	57.00	57.00
57	Marcelo Tosi	Eleda All Black	Brazil	58.00	58.00
58	Peter Thomsen	Barny	Germany	58.50	58.50
58	Takayuki Yumira	Latina	Japan	58.50	58.50
58	Marcio Carvalho	Josephine	Brazil	58.50	58.50
61	Mark Kyle	Coolio	Ireland	58.70	58.70
62	Linda Algotsson	La Fair	Sweden	59.80	59.80
62	Mikhail Nastenko	Coolroy Piter	Russia	59.80	59.80
64	Michael Ryan	Ballylynch Adventure	Ireland	60.20	60.20
65	Malin Petersen	Sofarsogood	Sweden	60.40	60.40
66	Denis Mesples	Oregon de la Vigne	France	61.50	61.50
67	Peter Barry	Kilrodan Abbott	Canada	61.70	61.70
68	Aliaksandr Faminou	Pasians	Belarus	63.70	63.70
69	Samantha Albert	Carraig Dubh	Jamaica	67.20	67.20
70	Alena Tseliapushkina	Passat	Belarus	69.10	69.10
71	Harald Ambros	O-Feltiz	Austria	69.50	69.50
72	Alexander Peternell	Asih	South Africa	70.40	70.40
73	Serguei Fofanoff	Barbara	Brazil	72.00	72.00
74	Andrei Korshunov	Fabiy	Russia	80.20	80.20

=== Standings after cross-country ===
Rank	Rider	Horse	Nation	Dressage	Cross-country	Total
1	Ingrid Klimke	Butts Abraxxas	Germany	39.30	0.00	39.30
1	Sara Algotsson Ostholt	Wega	Sweden	39.30	0.00	39.30
3	Mark Todd	Campino	New Zealand	39.10	0.40	39.50
4	Michael Jung	Sam	Germany	40.60	0.00	40.60
5	Kristina Cook	Miners Frolic	Great Britain	42.00	0.00	42.00
6	Mary King	Imperial Cavalier	Great Britain	40.90	1.20	42.10
7	Ludvig Svennerstål	Shamwari	Sweden	43.70	0.40	44.10
8	Sandra Auffarth	Opgun Louvo	Germany	40.00	4.80	44.80
9	Andrew Nicholson	Nereo	New Zealand	45.00	0.00	45.00
10	Christopher Burton	HP Leilani	Australia	46.10	0.00	46.10
10	Zara Phillips	High Kingdom	Great Britain	46.10	0.00	46.10
12	Phillip Dutton	Mystery Whisper	United States	44.30	2.80	47.10
13	Niklas Lindbäck	Mister Pooh	Sweden	45.20	2.80	48.00
14	Jonathan Paget	Clifton Promise	New Zealand	44.10	4.80	48.90
15	Andrew Hoy	Rutherglen	Australia	41.70	7.60	49.30
16	Stefano Brecciaroli	Apollo WD Wendi Kurt Hoev	Italy	38.50	11.60	50.10
17	Dirk Schrade	King Artus	Germany	39.80	10.80	50.60
18	Donatien Schauly	Ocarina du Chanois	France	44.40	7.20	51.60
18	Karin Donckers	Gazelle de la Brasserie	Belgium	40.00	11.60	51.60
20	Nicola Wilson	Opposition Buzz	Great Britain	51.70	0.00	51.70
21	Aoife Clark	Master Crusoe	Ireland	48.90	3.60	52.50
22	William Fox-Pitt	Lionheart	Great Britain	44.10	9.20	53.30
23	Vittoria Panizzoni	Borough Pennyz	Italy	53.50	0.00	53.50
24	Karen O'Connor	Mr Medicott	United States	48.20	5.60	53.80
24	Caroline Powell	Lenamore	New Zealand	52.20	1.60	53.80
26	Boyd Martin	Otis Barbotiere	United States	50.70	3.60	54.30
27	Nicolas Touzaint	Hildago de L'Ile	France	47.60	7.60	55.20
28	Jessica Phoenix	Exponential	Canada	54.80	2.40	57.20
29	Joseph Murphy	Electric Cruise	Ireland	55.60	4.80	60.40
30	Malin Petersen	Sofarsogood	Sweden	60.40	0.80	61.20
31	Jonelle Richards	Flintstar	New Zealand	56.70	6.00	62.70
32	Andrew Heffernan	Millthyne Corolla	Netherlands	50.60	12.40	63.00
33	Peter Thomsen	Barny	Germany	58.50	5.20	63.70
34	Joris Vanspringel	Lully des Aulnes	Belgium	51.90	12.80	64.70
35	Mark Kyle	Coolio	Ireland	58.70	7.20	65.90
36	Virginie Caulier	Nepal du Sudre	Belgium	48.30	21.20	69.50
37	Nina Ligon	Butts Leon	Thailand	53.90	16.00	69.90
38	Lionel Guyon	Nemetis de Lalou	France	50.90	20.00	70.90
39	Tim Lips	Oncarlos	Netherlands	51.70	22.00	73.70
40	Atsushi Negishi	Pretty Darling	Japan	50.40	25.60	76.00
41	Pawel Spisak	Wag	Poland	54.80	22.40	77.20
42	Tiana Coudray	Ringwood Magister	United States	52.00	25.60	77.60
43	Lucinda Fredericks	Flying Finish	Australia	40.00	38.00	78.00
44	Linda Algotsson	La Fair	Sweden	59.80	20.00	79.80
45	Ruy Fonseca	Tom Bombadill Too	Brazil	53.90	26.40	80.30
46	William Coleman	Twizzel	United States	46.30	36.40	82.70
47	Marcelo Tosi	Eleda All Black	Brazil	58.00	29.60	87.60
48	Ronald Zabala-Goetschel	Master Rose	Ecuador	53.30	36.00	89.30
49	Aurelien Kahn	Cadiz	France	55.90	39.60	95.50
50	Marcio Carvalho	Josephine	Brazil	58.50	42.80	101.30
51	Denis Mesples	Oregon de la Vigne	France	61.50	46.00	107.50
51	Marc Rigouts	Dunkas	Belgium	50.70	56.80	107.50
53	Mikhail Nastenko	Coolroy Piter	Russia	59.80	52.00	111.80
54	Andrei Korshunov	Fabiy	Russia	80.20	32.80	113.00
55	Toshiyuki Tanaka	Marquis de Plescop	Japan	55.00	60.00	115.00
56	Alexander Peternell	Asih	South Africa	70.40	46.00	116.40
57	Aliaksandr Faminou	Pasians	Belarus	63.70	52.80	116.50
58	Michelle Mueller	Amistad	Canada	57.00	63.20	120.20
59	Samantha Albert	Carraig Dubh	Jamaica	67.20	54.00	121.20
-	Yoshiaki Oiwa	Noonday de Conde	Japan	38.10	Eliminated	
-	Clayton Fredericks	Bendigo	Australia	40.40	Eliminated	
-	Kenki Sato	Chippieh	Japan	42.20	Eliminated	
-	Sam Griffiths	Happy Times	Australia	45.40	Eliminated	
-	Camilla Speirs	Portersize Just A Jiff	Ireland	47.60	Eliminated	
-	Hawley Bennett-Awad	Gin & Juice	Canada	48.70	Eliminated	
-	Rebecca Howard	Riddle Master	Canada	50.60	Eliminated	
-	Elaine Pen	Vira	Netherlands	52.20	Eliminated	
-	Carl Bouckaert	Cyrano Z	Belgium	53.00	Eliminated	
-	Takayuki Yumira	Latina	Japan	58.50	Eliminated	
-	Michael Ryan	Ballylynch Adventure	Ireland	60.20	Eliminated	
-	Peter Barry	Kilrodan Abbott	Canada	61.70	Eliminated	
-	Alena Tseliapushkina	Passat	Belarus	69.10	Eliminated	
-	Harald Ambros	O-Feltiz	Austria	69.50	Eliminated	
-	Serguei Fofanoff	Barbara	Brazil	72.00	Eliminated	

=== Standings after jumping (round 1) ===
Top 25 qualify for the final with a maximum of 3 riders per Nation (NOC).

Rank	Rider	Horse	Nation	Dressage	Cross-country	Jumping 1	Total
1	Sara Algotsson Ostholt	Wega	Sweden	39.30	0.00	0.00	39.30
2	Michael Jung	Sam	Germany	40.60	0.00	0.00	40.60
3	Mary King	Imperial Cavalier	Great Britain	40.90	1.20	0.00	42.10
4	Kristina Cook	Miners Frolic	Great Britain	42.00	0.00	1.00	43.00
5	Sandra Auffarth	Opgun Louvo	Germany	40.00	4.80	0.00	44.80
6	Andrew Nicholson	Nereo	New Zealand	45.00	0.00	0.00	45.00
7	Mark Todd	Campino	New Zealand	39.10	0.40	7.00	46.50
8	Ingrid Klimke	Butts Abraxxas	Germany	39.30	0.00	9.00	48.30
9	Christopher Burton	HP Leilani	Australia	46.10	0.00	4.00	50.10
10	Dirk Schrade	King Artus	Germany	39.80	10.80	0.00	50.60
11	Ludvig Svennerstål	Shamwari	Sweden	43.70	0.40	8.00	52.10
12	Aoife Clark	Master Crusoe	Ireland	48.90	3.60	0.00	52.50
13	Jonathan Paget	Clifton Promise	New Zealand	44.10	4.80	4.00	52.90
14	Zara Phillips	High Kingdom	Great Britain	46.10	0.00	7.00	53.10
15	William Fox-Pitt	Lionheart	Great Britain	44.10	9.20	0.00	53.30
16	Karen O'Connor	Mr Medicott	United States	48.20	5.60	0.00	53.80
17	Vittoria Panizzoni	Borough Pennyz	Italy	53.50	0.00	1.00	53.50
18	Karin Donckers	Gazelle de la Brasserie	Belgium	40.00	11.60	4.00	55.60
19	Nicola Wilson	Opposition Buzz	Great Britain	51.70	0.00	4.00	55.70
20	Niklas Lindbäck	Mister Pooh	Sweden	45.20	2.80	9.00	57.00
21	Nicolas Touzaint	Hildago de L'Ile	France	47.60	7.60	2.00	57.20
22	Andrew Hoy	Rutherglen	Australia	41.70	7.60	8.00	57.30
23	Caroline Powell	Lenamore	New Zealand	52.20	1.60	4.00	57.80
24	Joseph Murphy	Electric Cruise	Ireland	55.60	4.80	0.00	60.40
25	Stefano Brecciaroli	Apollo WD Wendi Kurt Hoev	Italy	38.50	11.60	11.00	61.10
26	Malin Petersen	Sofarsogood	Sweden	60.40	0.80	6.00	67.20
27	Phillip Dutton	Mystery Whisper	United States	44.30	2.80	23.00	70.10
28	Lionel Guyon	Nemetis de Lalou	France	50.90	20.00	0.00	70.90
29	Jessica Phoenix	Exponential	Canada	54.80	2.40	14.00	71.20
30	Peter Thomsen	Barny	Germany	58.50	5.20	8.00	71.70
30	Jonelle Richards	Flintstar	New Zealand	56.70	6.00	9.00	71.70
32	Mark Kyle	Coolio	Ireland	58.70	7.20	6.00	71.90
33	Andrew Heffernan	Millthyne Corolla	Netherlands	50.60	12.40	12.00	75.00
34	Virginie Caulier	Nepal du Sudre	Belgium	48.30	21.20	9.00	78.50
35	Lucinda Fredericks	Flying Finish	Australia	40.00	38.00	1.00	79.00
36	Linda Algotsson	La Fair	Sweden	59.80	20.00	0.00	79.80
37	William Coleman	Twizzel	United States	46.30	36.40	2.00	84.70
38	Tim Lips	Oncarlos	Netherlands	51.70	22.00	13.00	86.70
39	Atsushi Negishi	Pretty Darling	Japan	50.40	25.60	12.00	88.00
40	Tiana Coudray	Ringwood Magister	United States	52.00	25.60	11.00	88.60
41	Nina Ligon	Butts Leon	Thailand	53.90	16.00	22.00	91.90
42	Ruy Fonseca	Tom Bombadill Too	Brazil	53.90	26.40	12.00	92.30
43	Ronald Zabala-Goetschel	Master Rose	Ecuador	53.30	36.00	7.00	96.30
44	Marcelo Tosi	Eleda All Black	Brazil	58.00	29.60	10.00	97.60
45	Aurelien Kahn	Cadiz	France	55.90	39.60	7.00	102.50
46	Marcio Carvalho	Josephine	Brazil	58.50	42.80	4.00	105.30
47	Mikhail Nastenko	Coolroy Piter	Russia	59.80	52.00	2.00	113.80
48	Toshiyuki Tanaka	Marquis de Plescop	Japan	55.00	60.00	4.00	119.00
49	Alexander Peternell	Asih	South Africa	70.40	46.00	7.00	123.40
50	Denis Mesples	Oregon de la Vigne	France	61.50	46.00	19.00	126.50
51	Samantha Albert	Carraig Dubh	Jamaica	67.20	54.00	21.00	142.20
52	Aliaksandr Faminou	Pasians	Belarus	63.70	52.80	34.00	150.50
53	Andrei Korshunov	Fabiy	Russia	80.20	32.80	52.00	165.00
-	Donatien Schauly	Ocarina du Chanois	France	44.40	7.20	Withdrew	
-	Boyd Martin	Otis Barbotiere	United States	50.70	3.60	Withdrew	
-	Joris Vanspringel	Lully des Aulnes	Belgium	51.90	12.80	Withdrew	
-	Pawel Spisak	Wag	Poland	54.80	22.40	Withdrew	
-	Marc Rigouts	Dunkas	Belgium	50.70	56.80	Withdrew	
-	Michelle Mueller	Amistad	Canada	57.00	63.20	Withdrew	

=== Final results after jumping (round 2) ===
Rank	Rider	Horse	Nation	Dressage	Cross-country	Jumping	Total (After Jumping 1)	Final jumping	Total
1st place, gold medalist(s)	Michael Jung	Sam	Germany	40.60	0.00	0.00	40.60	0.00	40.60
2nd place, silver medalist(s)	Sara Algotsson Ostholt	Wega	Sweden	39.30	0.00	0.00	39.30	4.00	43.30
3rd place, bronze medalist(s)	Sandra Auffarth	Opgun Louvo	Germany	40.00	4.80	0.00	44.80	0.00	44.80
4	Andrew Nicholson	Nereo	New Zealand	45.00	0.00	0.00	45.00	4.00	49.00
5	Mary King	Imperial Cavalier	Great Britain	40.90	1.20	0.00	42.10	8.00	50.10
6	Kristina Cook	Miners Frolic	Great Britain	42.00	0.00	1.00	43.00	8.00	51.00
7	Aoife Clark	Master Crusoe	Ireland	48.90	3.60	0.00	52.50	0.00	52.50
8	Zara Phillips	High Kingdom	Great Britain	46.10	0.00	7.00	53.10	0.00	53.10
9	Karen O'Connor	Mr Medicott	United States	48.20	5.60	0.00	53.80	0.00	53.80
10	Jonathan Paget	Clifton Promise	New Zealand	44.10	4.80	8.80	52.90	1.00	53.90
11	Vittoria Panizzoni	Borough Pennyz	Italy	53.50	0.00	1.00	54.50	0.00	54.50
12	Mark Todd	Campino	New Zealand	39.10	0.40	7.00	46.50	8.00	54.50
13	Andrew Hoy	Rutherglen	Australia	41.70	7.60	8.00	57.30	0.00	57.30
14	Joseph Murphy	Electric Cruise	Ireland	55.60	4.80	0.00	60.40	0.00	60.40
15	Karin Donckers	Gazelle de la Brasserie	Belgium	40.00	11.60	4.00	55.60	6.00	61.60
16	Christopher Burton	HP Leilani	Australia	46.10	0.00	4.00	50.10	12.00	62.10
17	Nicolas Touzaint	Hildago de L'Ile	France	47.60	7.60	5.00	57.20	7.00	64.20
18	Niklas Lindbäck	Mister Pooh	Sweden	45.20	2.80	9.00	57.00	11.00	68.00
19	Stefano Brecciaroli	Apollo WD Wendi Kurt Hoev	Italy	38.50	11.60	11.00	61.10	8.00	69.10
20	Ludvig Svennerstål	Shamwari	Sweden	43.70	0.40	8.00	52.10	20.00	72.10
21	Mark Kyle	Coolio	Ireland	58.70	7.20	6.00	71.90	4.00	75.90
22	Jessica Phoenix	Exponential	Canada	54.80	2.40	14.00	71.20	8.00	79.20
23	Phillip Dutton	Mystery Whisper	United States	44.30	2.80	23.00	70.10	11.00	81.10
24	Lionel Guyon	Nemetis de Lalou	France	50.90	20.00	0.00	70.90	21.00	91.90
-	Ingrid Klimke	Butts Abraxxas	Germany	39.30	0.00	9.00	48.30	Withdrew	

- Note:The four pairs who did not advance to the final jumping round because three pairs from their nation had already qualified, were Dirk Schrade, William Fox-Pitt, Nicola Wilson and Caroline Powell.
