= Donatien Schauly =

French equestrian

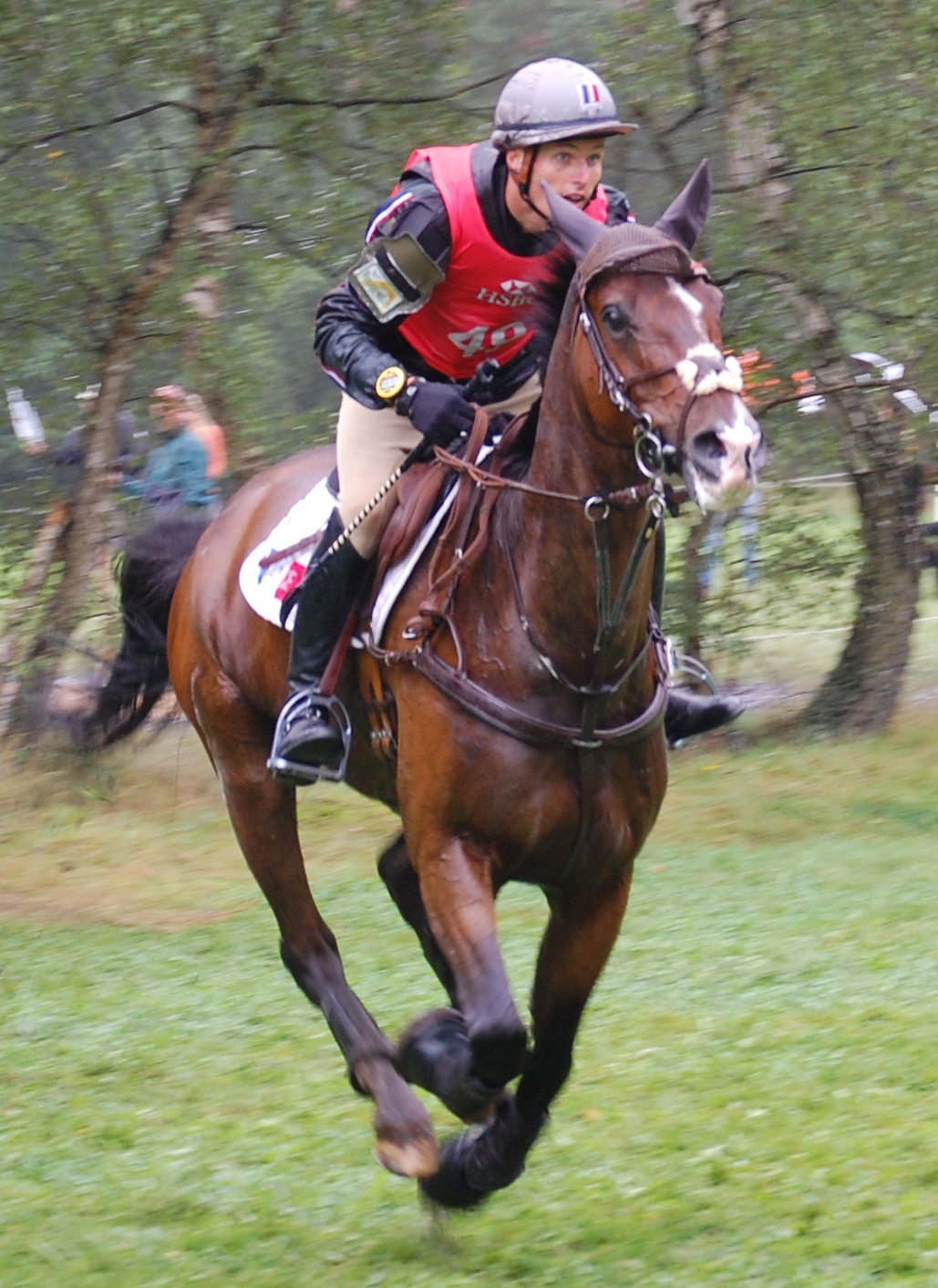
- Donatien Schauly and Ocarina du Chanois, 2011 European Eventing Championship

Personal information
- Born: 9 June 1985 (age 41) Mulhouse, France
Medal record
Equestrian
Representing France
World Championships
Bronze medal – third place	2018 Tryon	Team eventing
European Championships
Silver medal – second place	2011 Luhmühlen	Team eventing
Bronze medal – third place	2013 Malmo	Team eventing

Donatien Schauly (born 9 June 1985, in Mulhouse) is a French equestrian. At the 2012 Summer Olympics he competed in the Individual eventing.
