= Niklas Lindbäck =

Swedish equestrian

Medal record

Representing Sweden

Equestrian

European Championships
| Silver medal – second place | 2013 Malmo | Team eventing |
| Silver medal – second place | 2017 Strzegom | Team eventing |
| Bronze medal – third place | 2019 Luhmühlen | Team eventing |

Niklas Lindbäck (born 2 March 1974) is a Swedish equestrian. He competed at the 2012 Summer Olympics in individual and team eventing, finishing seventeenth and fourth respectively.
