= Michael Jung (equestrian) =

German equestrian (born 1982)

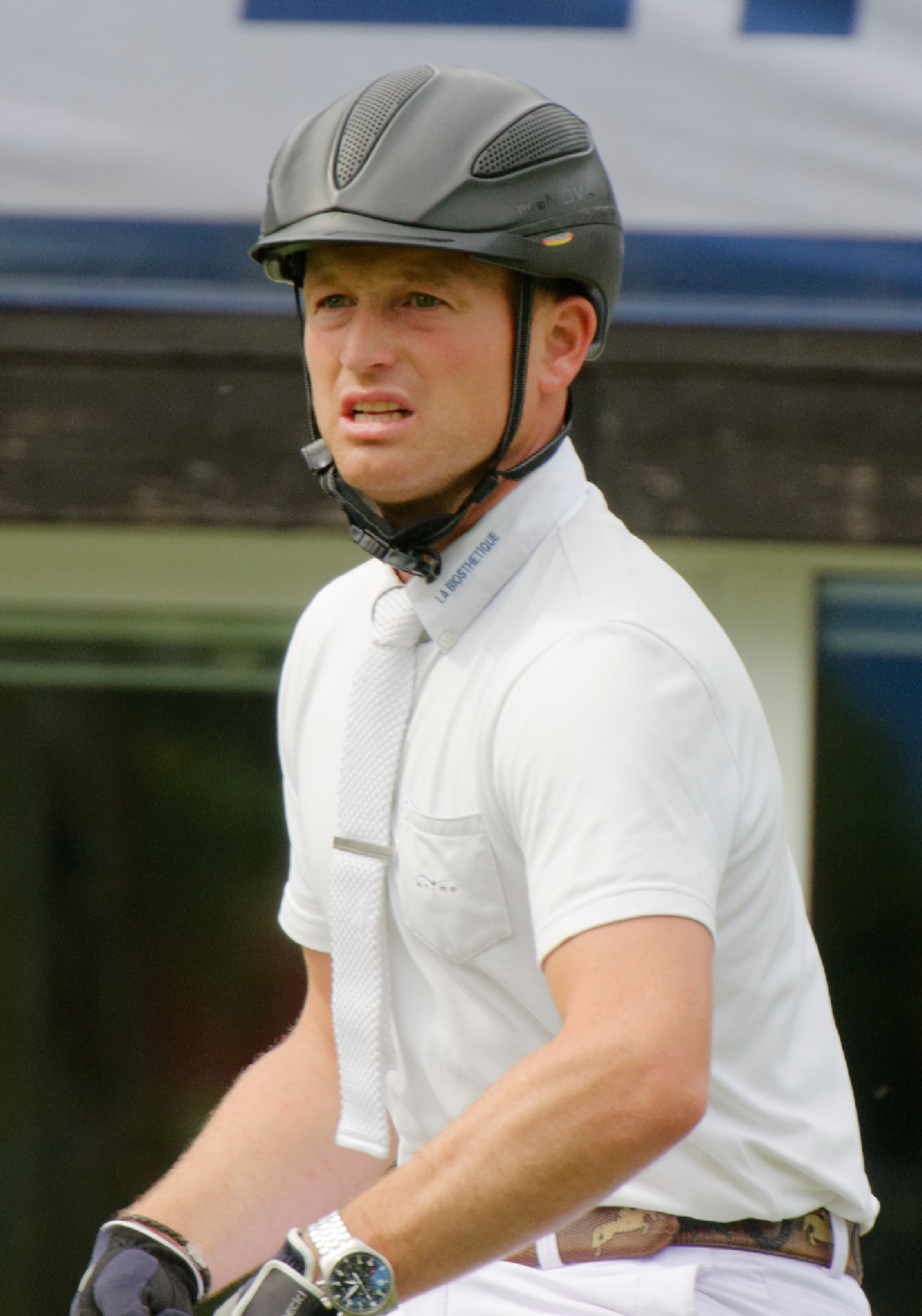
- Jung in 2014

Personal information
- Born: 31 July 1982 (age 44) Bad Soden am Taunus, West Germany
- Height: 168 cm (5 ft 6 in)
- Weight: 70 kg (154 lb)

Sport
- Sport: Horse riding
- Event: Eventing
Medal record
Equestrian
Representing Germany
Olympic Games
Gold medal – first place	2012 London	Individual eventing
Gold medal – first place	2012 London	Team eventing
Gold medal – first place	2016 Rio de Janeiro	Individual eventing
Gold medal – first place	2024 Paris	Individual eventing
Silver medal – second place	2016 Rio de Janeiro	Team eventing
World Championships
Gold medal – first place	2010 Kentucky	Individual eventing
Gold medal – first place	2014 Normandy	Team eventing
Gold medal – first place	2022 Pratoni	Team eventing
Gold medal – first place	2026 Aachen	Individual eventing
Silver medal – second place	2014 Normandy	Individual eventing
Silver medal – second place	2026 Aachen	Team eventing
European Championships
Gold medal – first place	2011 Luhmühlen	Team eventing
Gold medal – first place	2011 Luhmühlen	Individual eventing
Gold medal – first place	2013 Malmö	Team eventing
Gold medal – first place	2013 Malmö	Individual eventing
Gold medal – first place	2015 Blair Castle	Team eventing
Gold medal – first place	2015 Blair Castle	Individual eventing
Gold medal – first place	2019 Luhmühlen	Team eventing
Gold medal – first place	2025 Blenheim	Team eventing
Silver medal – second place	2017 Strzegom	Individual eventing
Silver medal – second place	2019 Luhmühlen	Individual eventing
Silver medal – second place	2021 Avenches	Team eventing
Silver medal – second place	2025 Blenheim	Individual eventing
Bronze medal – third place	2009 Fontainebleau	Individual eventing

Michael Jung (born 31 July 1982) is a German equestrian who competes in eventing and show jumping. A four-time Olympic gold medallist, he won individual and team gold at the 2012 London Olympics, followed by individual gold and team silver at the 2016 Rio Olympics, and the individual gold for the third time at the 2024 Paris Olympics. He was inducted into the Eventing Rider Association Hall of Fame in 2013, and in 2016 he became only the second rider in history to win the Grand Slam of Eventing.

== Career ==
He was born to Joachim Jung, a former dressage and show jumping competitor and took up horse riding aged 6. He won individual bronze at the 2009 European Championships. At the 2012 Olympic Games, he won gold medals in the individual and team events. In winning the individual event (on his 30th birthday), he made eventing history by becoming the first rider to ever hold the Olympic, World and European championship titles at the same time, having previously won the 2010 World title and 2011 European title. He won all three titles on the horse La Biosthetique Sam.

Since then, Jung has won individual and team gold medals at the 2013 Europeans, individual silver and team gold at the 2014 World Equestrian Games and individual and team gold at the 2015 European Championships. His individual victory at the 2015 Europeans made him only the second rider in history, after Virginia Leng, to win three consecutive European individual titles on three different horses. His wins were on La Biosthetique Sam (2011), Halunke FBW (2013) and FischerTakinou (2015). He won individual and team silver at the 2017 European Championships on Fischerrocanna. Michael Jung's individual silver at the 2014 World Equestrian Games & his individual silver at the 2017 Europeans were won on Fischerocona FST.

Jung's win at Badminton in 2016 sealed the Rolex Grand Slam, becoming only the second person in history to win it. His top horse La Biothesque Sam has also finished second at the Badminton horse trials in 2013 and 2017, and third at both Rolex Kentucky (2015) and Luhmuhlen (2015).

== CCI 5* results ==
Results
Event	Kentucky	Badminton	Luhmühlen	Burghley	Pau	Adelaide
2009			(gold) (Sam)			
2010	did not participate					
2011			RET (Leopin FST)			
2012			(gold) (Leopin FST)		(bronze) (Leopin FST)	
2013		(silver) (Sam); 47th (Leopin FST)				
2014		(silver) (FischerRocana)				
2015	(gold) (FischerRocana); (bronze) (Sam)		(bronze) (Sam); RET (FischerRocana)	(gold) (Sam); EL (FischerRocana)	(silver) (FischerRocana); WD (Halunke FBW)	
2016	(gold) (FischerRocana)	(gold) (Sam)			(silver) (FischerTakinou); (bronze) (FischerRocana)	
2017	(gold) (FischerRocana)	(silver) (Sam)		RET (Sam)	WD (Sam)	
2018	(silver) (FischerRocana)	10th (Sam)				
2019	did not participate					
2020	did not participate					
2021		Cancelled due to COVID-19	5th (FischerWild Wave)	Cancelled due to COVID-19		
2022	(gold) (FischerChipmunk FRH)					
2023						
2024						
2025	(gold) (FischerChipmunk FRH)					
EL = Eliminated; RET = Retired; WD = Withdrew

== International Championship results ==
Results
Year	Event	Horse	Placing	Notes
1999	European Junior Championships	Maricos	2nd place, silver medalist(s)	Team
1999	European Junior Championships	Maricos	9th	Individual
2003	European Young Rider Championships	Marco 522	2nd place, silver medalist(s)	Team
2003	European Young Rider Championships	Marco 522	1st place, gold medalist(s)	Individual
2006	World Young Horse Championships	Sam	2nd place, silver medalist(s)	CCI*
2007	World Young Horse Championships	Desperado S	13th	CCI*
2007	World Young Horse Championships	Sam	2nd place, silver medalist(s)	CCI**
2008	World Young Horse Championships	River of Joy 4	7th	CCI**
2008	Eventing World Cup Final	Sam	4th	
2009	Eventing World Cup Final	Sam	1st place, gold medalist(s)	
2009	European Championships	Sam	8th	Team
2009	European Championships	Sam	3rd place, bronze medalist(s)	Individual
2010	World Equestrian Games	Sam	5th	Team
2010	World Equestrian Games	Sam	1st place, gold medalist(s)	Individual
2011	World Young Horse Championships	FischerRocana	1st place, gold medalist(s)	CCI*
2011	World Young Horse Championships	Halunke FBW	32nd	CCI**
2011	European Championships	Sam	1st place, gold medalist(s)	Team
2011	European Championships	Sam	1st place, gold medalist(s)	Individual
2012	Olympic Games	Sam	1st place, gold medalist(s)	Team
2012	Olympic Games	Sam	1st place, gold medalist(s)	Individual
2013	World Young Horse Championships	Ricona FST	WD	CCI*
2013	European Championships	Halunke FBW	1st place, gold medalist(s)	Team
2013	European Championships	Halunke FBW	1st place, gold medalist(s)	Individual
2014	World Young Horse Championships	Star Connection	1st place, gold medalist(s)	CCI*
2014	World Young Horse Championships	FischerTakinou	4th	CCI**
2014	World Young Horse Championships	Ricona FST	25th	CCI**
2014	World Equestrian Games	FischerRocana	1st place, gold medalist(s)	Team
2014	World Equestrian Games	FischerRocana	2nd place, silver medalist(s)	Individual
2015	World Young Horse Championships	FischerIncantas	1st place, gold medalist(s)	CCI*
2015	World Young Horse Championships	Lennox 364	8th	CCI**
2015	European Championships	FischerTakinou	1st place, gold medalist(s)	Team
2015	European Championships	FischerTakinou	1st place, gold medalist(s)	Individual
2016	Olympic Games	Sam	2nd place, silver medalist(s)	Team
2016	Olympic Games	Sam	1st place, gold medalist(s)	Individual
2017	European Championships	FischerRocana	10th	Team
2017	European Championships	FischerRocana	2nd place, silver medalist(s)	Individual
2019	European Championships	FischerChipmunk FRH	1st place, gold medalist(s)	Team
2019	European Championships	FischerChipmunk FRH	2nd place, silver medalist(s)	Individual
2021	Olympic Games	FischerChipmunk FRH	4th	Team
2021	Olympic Games	FischerChipmunk FRH	8th	Individual
2021	European Championships	FischerWild Wave	2nd place, silver medalist(s)	Team
2021	European Championships	FischerWild Wave	4th	Individual
EL = Eliminated; RET = Retired; WD = Withdrew

== Notable horses ==
- Marco 522 - 1995 Bay Holsteiner Gelding (Mytens XX x Montanus)
  - 2003 European Young Rider Championships - team silver medal, individual gold medal
- La Biosthetique Sam FBW - 2000 Bay Baden-Wurttemberger Gelding (Stan The Man XX x Heraldik XX)
  - 2007 FEI Eventing Young Horse World Championships - second place
  - 2008 FEI Eventing World Cup Final - fourth place
  - 2009 FEI Eventing World Cup Final - gold medal
  - 2009 Luhmühlen CCI**** winner
  - 2009 European Championships - individual bronze medal
  - 2010 World Equestrian Games - team fifth place, individual gold medal
  - 2011 European Championships - team gold medal, individual gold medal
  - 2012 London Olympic Games - team gold medal, individual gold medal
  - 2015 Burghley CCI**** winner
  - 2016 Badminton CCI**** winner
  - 2016 Rio Olympic Games - team silver medal, individual gold medal
- Desperado S - 2001 Bay Wurttemberger Gelding (Divino de L x Grand Ferdinand II)
  - 2007 FEI Eventing Young Horse World Championships - 13th place
- River of Joy 4 - 2001 Dark Bay Wurttemberger Gelding (Rubicell x Pageno xx)
  - 2008 FEI Eventing Young Horse World Championships - seventh place
- Leopin FST - 1999 Bay German Riding Horse Gelding (Legal Legend XX x Pius)
  - 2012 Luhmühlen CCI**** winner
- FischerRocana FST - 2005 Dark Bay German Sport Horse Mare (Ituango XX x Carismo)
  - 2014 World Equestrian Games - team gold medal, individual silver medal
  - 2015 Kentucky CCI**** winner
  - 2016 Kentucky CCI**** winner
  - 2017 Kentucky CCI**** winner
  - 2017 European Championships - individual silver medal
- FischerTakinou - 2007 Red Roan Anglo Arabian Gelding (Jaguar Mail x Sardana Pierre)
  - 2015 European Championships - team gold medal, individual gold medal
- FischerChipmunk FRH - 2008 Bay Hanoverian Gelding (Contendro I x Heraldik XX)
  - 2019 European Championships - team gold medal, individual silver medal
  - 2022 Kentucky CCI5* winner
  - 2024 Paris Olympic Games - individual gold medal
  - 2025 Kentucky CCI5* winner
