= Alexander Peternell =

South African equestrian

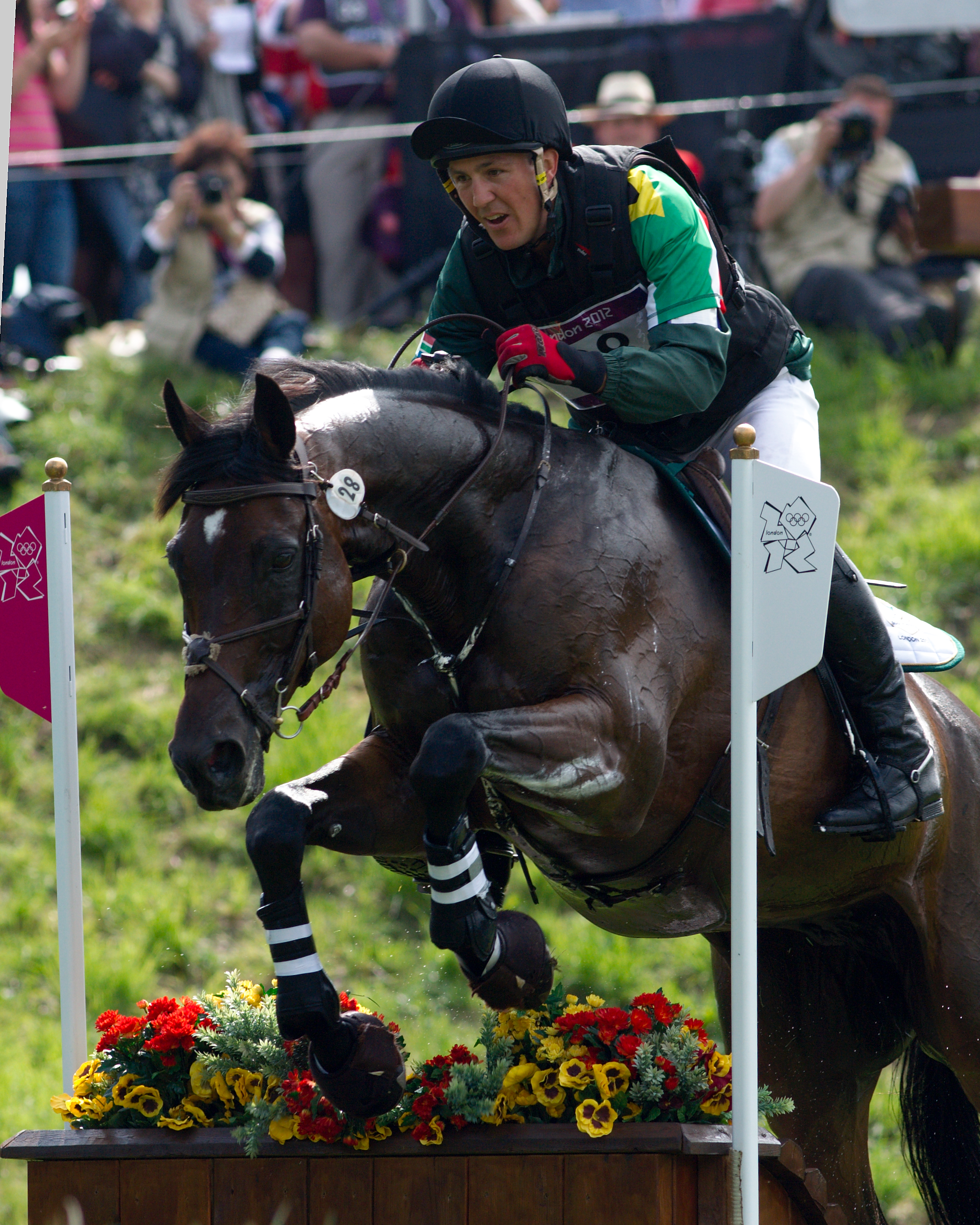
- Alexander Peternell and Asih competing at the 2012 Summer Olympics in London

Personal information
- Nationality: South African
- Discipline: Equestrian
- Born: 11 February 1981 (age 45); Roodepoort, South Africa
- Horse(s): Asih, AP Topstar, AP Not Landing, AP Uprising

Alexander Peternell (born 11 February 1981) is a South African equestrian.

== 2012 London Olympics ==
At the 2012 Summer Olympics, Peternell competed in the Individual eventing. Peternell was not initially selected for his national team. Paul Hart was originally chosen to represent South Africa in the games. Peternell appealed on the grounds that Hart had placed 278 places below Peternell in the FEI rankings. On 23 July 2012 the Court of Arbitration for Sport ruled that South Africa should have chosen Peternell as their representative. South Africa replied by stating they would not send anyone. A second appeal was filed by Peternell leading to the ruling by the court that would require South Africa to send Peternell as their representative.
