= Sandra Auffarth =

German equestrian (born 1986)

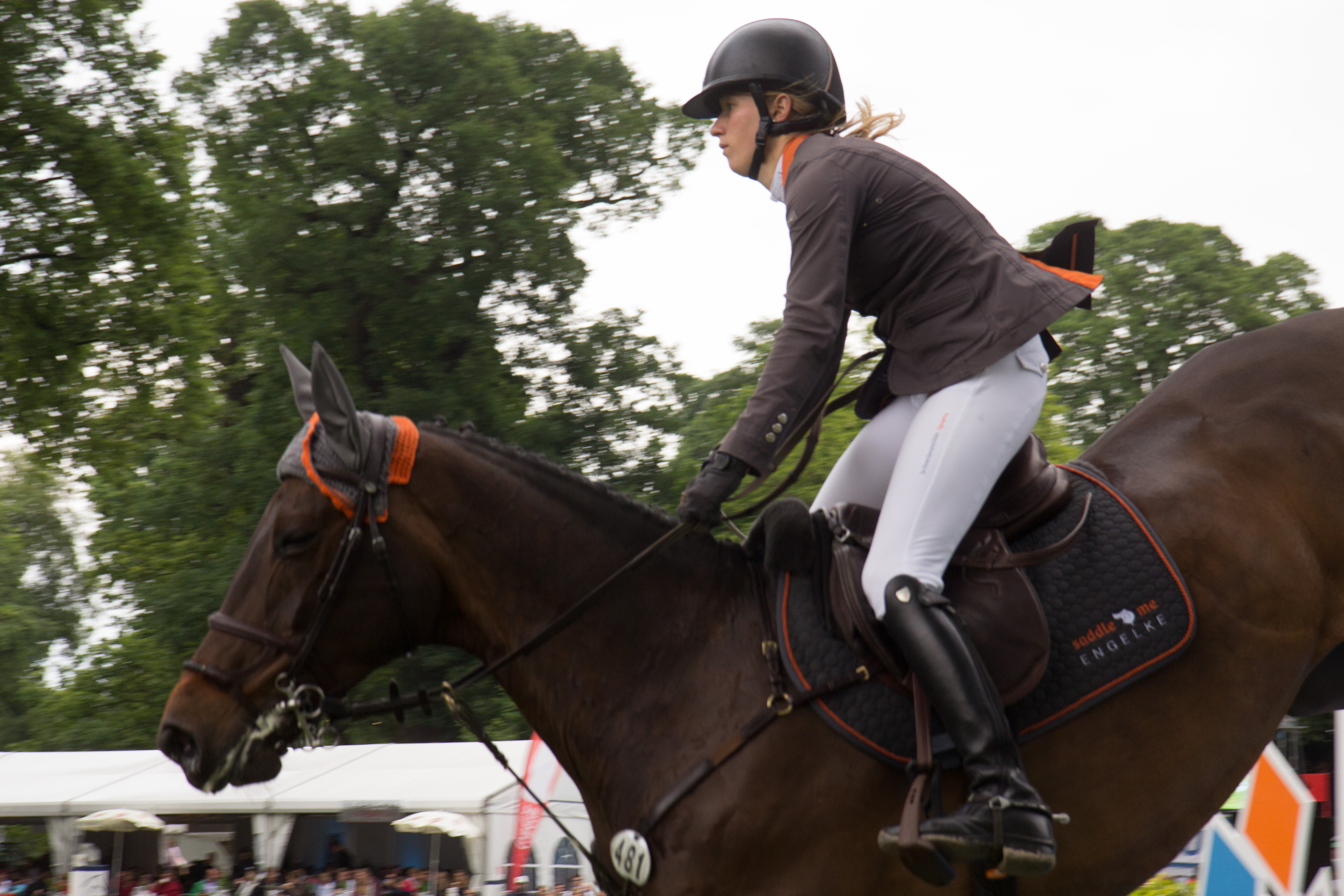
- Auffarth with Landlord in 2018

Personal information
- Born: 27 December 1986 (age 39) Delmenhorst, West Germany
- Height: 1.70 m (5 ft 7 in) (2012)
- Weight: 58 kg (128 lb) (2012)

Sport
- Country: Germany
- Sport: Equestrian
Medal record
Representing Germany
Equestrian
Olympic Games
Gold medal – first place	2012 London	Team eventing
Silver medal – second place	2016 Rio de Janeiro	Team eventing
Bronze medal – third place	2012 London	Individual eventing
World Championships
Gold medal – first place	2014 Normandy	Individual eventing
Gold medal – first place	2014 Normandy	Team eventing
Gold medal – first place	2022 Pratoni	Team eventing
European Championships
Gold medal – first place	2011 Luhmühlen	Team eventing
Gold medal – first place	2015 Blair Castle	Team eventing
Silver medal – second place	2011 Luhmühlen	Individual eventing
Silver medal – second place	2015 Blair Castle	Individual eventing
Bronze medal – third place	2023 Haras du Pin	Individual eventing

Sandra Auffarth (born 27 December 1986) is a German equestrian.

At the 2012 Summer Olympics she competed in the Individual eventing with Opgun Louvo. Auffarth and Louvo had won team gold and individual bronze at the 2012 Summer Olympics. One year before, she had won team gold and individual silver with Opgun Louvo at her first senior rider championship - the 2011 European Eventing Championship.

Auffarth was selected to represent Germany in the 2024 Summer Olympics in Paris. At the final health check before the games, her mount Viamant Du Matz was "found to be not 100 percent fit", and the pair resigned their place to the reserve rider Julia Krajewski.

She lives in Ganderkesee, where she and her parents have a horse farm.

== CCI 5* results ==
Results
Event	Kentucky	Badminton	Luhmühlen	Burghley	Pau	Adelaide
2011			(silver) (Opgun Louvo)			
2012	Did not participate					
2013		4th (Opgun Louvo)				
2014-18	Did not participate					
EL = Eliminated; RET = Retired; WD = Withdrew

== International championship results ==
Results
Year	Event	Horse	Placing	Notes
2006	World Young Horse Championships	Nobel Prince OLD	WD	CCI**
2006	European Young Rider Championships	Carlos 205	3rd place, bronze medalist(s)	Team
2006	European Young Rider Championships	Carlos 205	21st	Individual
2007	European Young Rider Championships	Nobel Prince OLD	3rd place, bronze medalist(s)	Team
2007	European Young Rider Championships	Nobel Prince OLD	RET	Individual
2009	World Young Horse Championships	Opgun Louvo	3rd place, bronze medalist(s)	CCI**
2011	European Championships	Opgun Louvo	1st place, gold medalist(s)	Team
2011	European Championships	Opgun Louvo	2nd place, silver medalist(s)	Individual
2012	Olympic Games	Opgun Louvo	1st place, gold medalist(s)	Team
2012	Olympic Games	Opgun Louvo	3rd place, bronze medalist(s)	Individual
2014	World Equestrian Games	Opgun Louvo	1st place, gold medalist(s)	Team
2014	World Equestrian Games	Opgun Louvo	1st place, gold medalist(s)	Individual
2015	European Championships	Opgun Louvo	1st place, gold medalist(s)	Team
2015	European Championships	Opgun Louvo	2nd place, silver medalist(s)	Individual
2016	World Young Horse Championships	Viamant du Matz	EL	CCI**
2016	Olympic Games	Opgun Louvo	2nd place, silver medalist(s)	Team
2016	Olympic Games	Opgun Louvo	11th	Individual
2018	World Equestrian Games	Viamant du Matz	RET	Individual
EL = Eliminated; RET = Retired; WD = Withdrew

== Notable horses ==
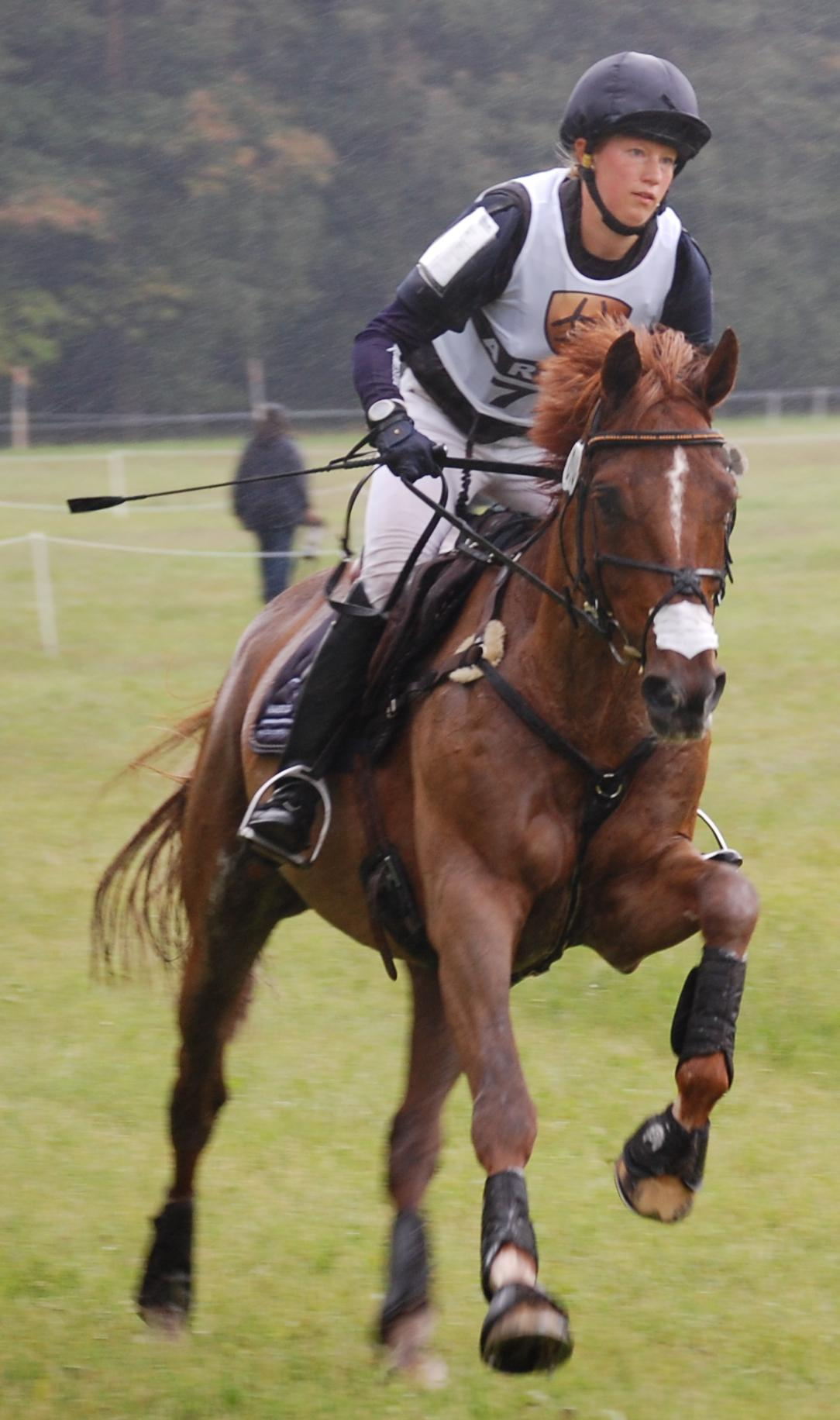
Sandra Auffarth with Opgun Louvo at the 2011 Luhmühlen Horse Trials

- Carlos 205 - 1997 Dark Bay Oldenburg Gelding (Coriolan x Matcho AA)
- Nobel Prince OLD - 1999 Bay Oldenburg Gelding (Noble Roi XX x Ramiro's Son I)
- Opgun Louvo - 2002 Chestnut Selle Francais Gelding (Shogoun II x J't'adore)
