= Virginie Caulier =

Belgian equestrian

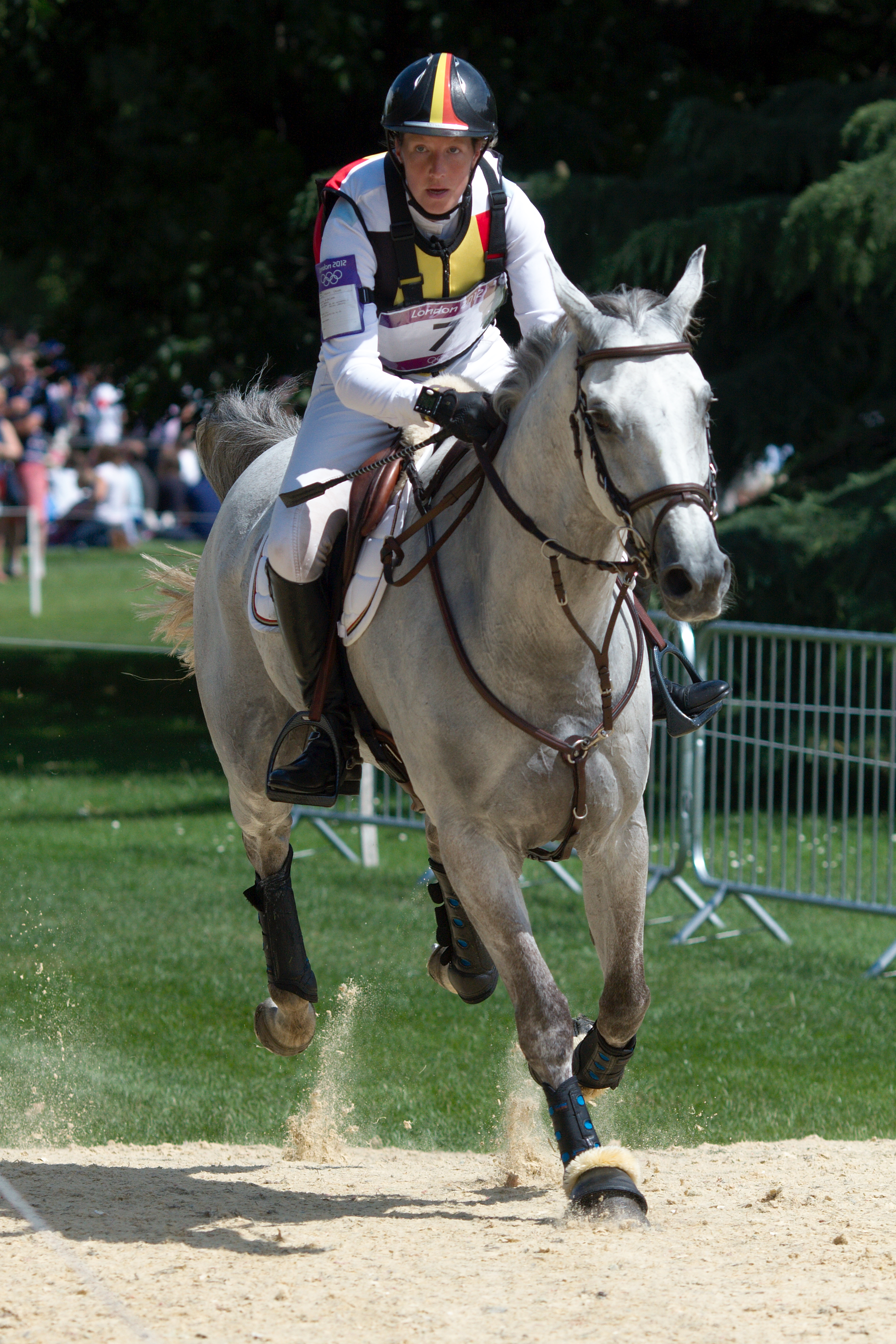
- Virginie Caulier and Nepal Du Sudre competing at the 2012 Summer Olympics in London.

Medal record

Representing Belgium

Equestrian

European Championships
Bronze medal – third place	1999 Luhmühlen	Team eventing
Bronze medal – third place	2009 Fontainebleau	Team eventing

Virginie Caulier is a Belgian equestrian. At the 2012 Summer Olympics she competed in the Individual eventing.
