= Marc Rigouts =

Belgian equestrian

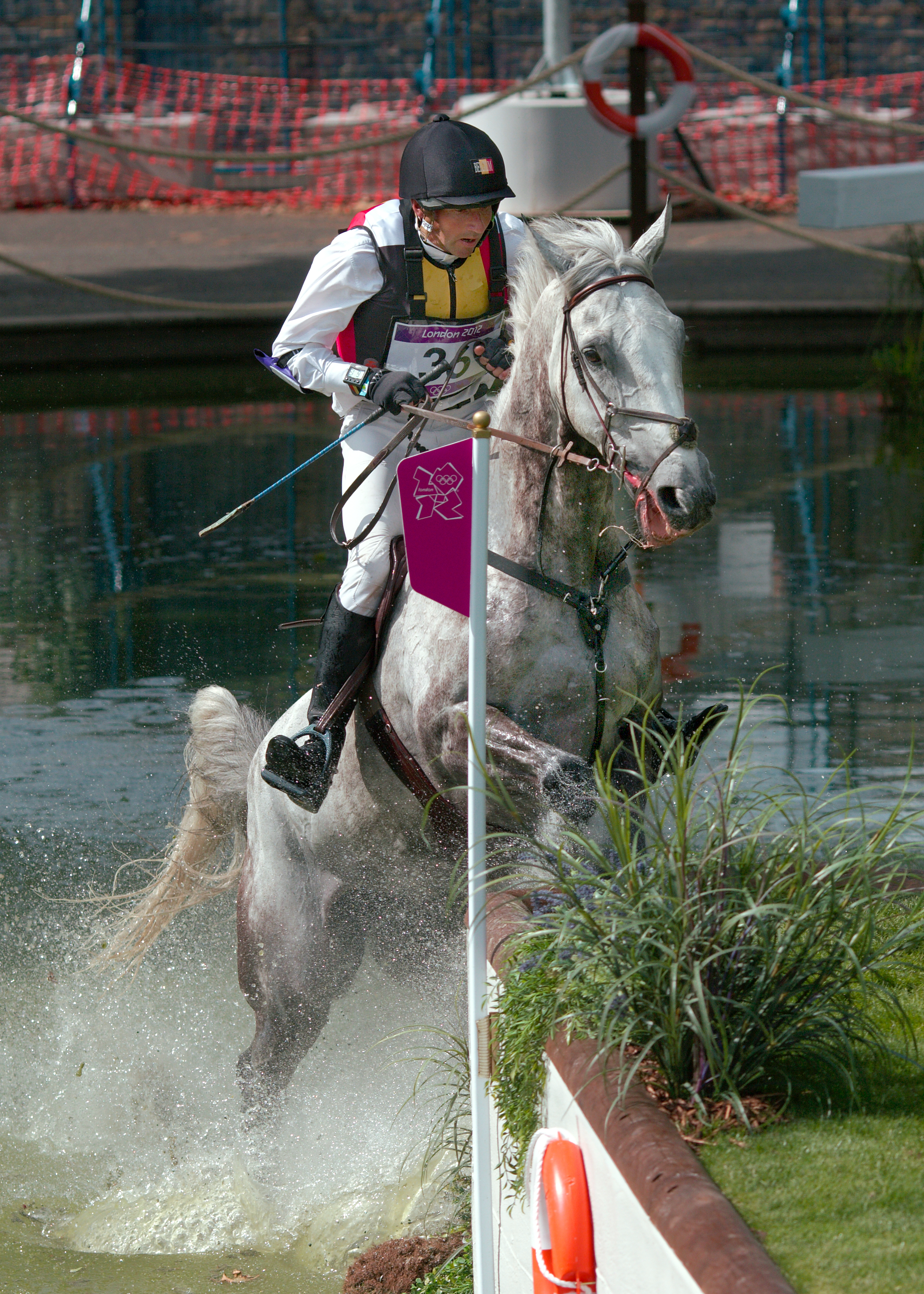
Marc Rigouts and Dunkas competing at the 2012 Summer Olympics in London.

Marc Rigouts is a Belgian equestrian. At the 2012 Summer Olympics he competed in the Individual eventing. He completed the Dressage and Cross-country rounds, but withdrew before the first round of Jumping, preventing him from advancing to the final 25.
