= Michelle Mueller =

Canadian equestrian

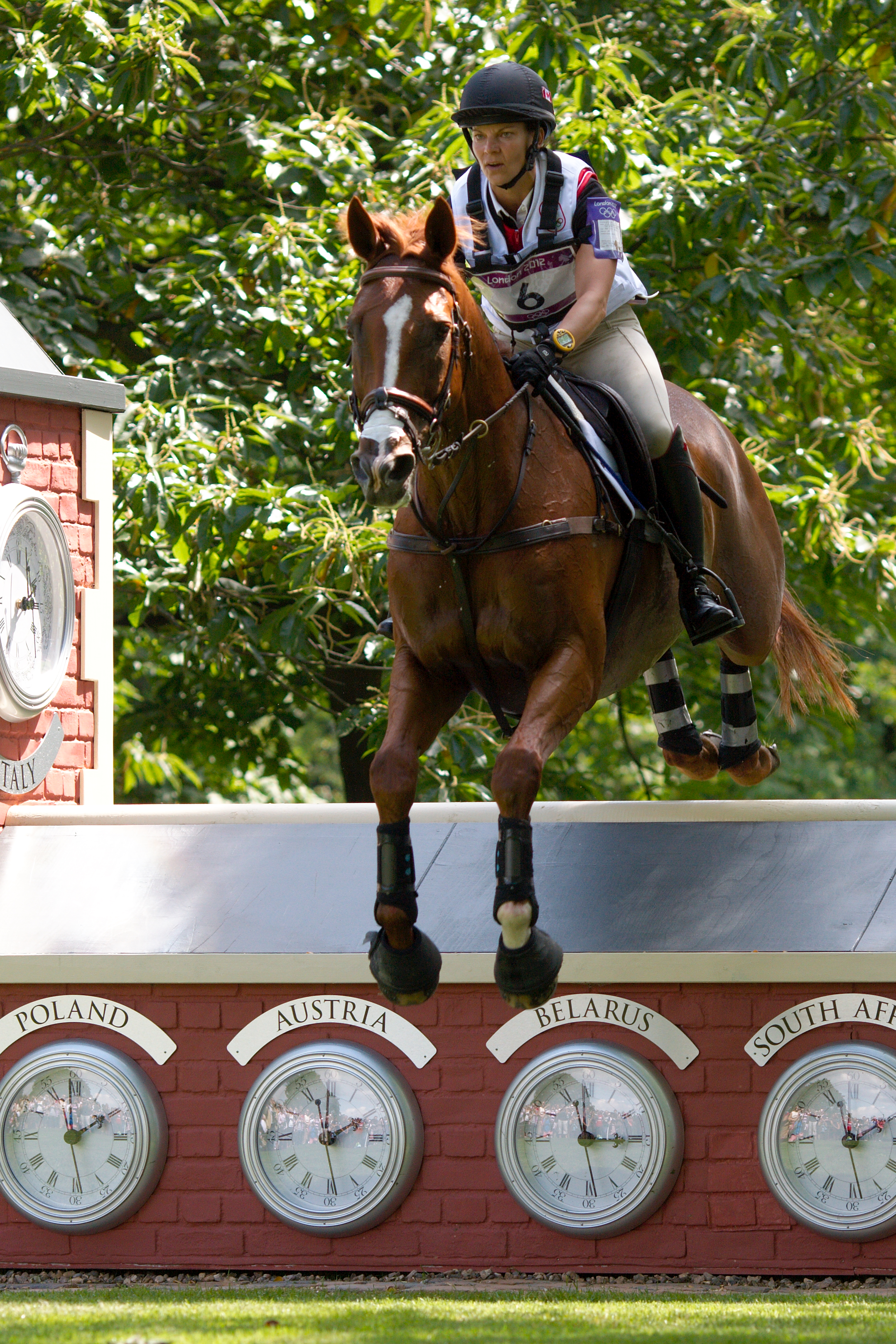
Michelle Mueller and Armistad competing at the 2012 Summer Olympics in London.

Michelle Mueller (born 20 November 1963) is a Canadian Equestrian Team athlete in Eventing. At the 2012 Summer Olympics she competed in the Individual eventing.
