= Andrei Korshunov =

Russian equestrian

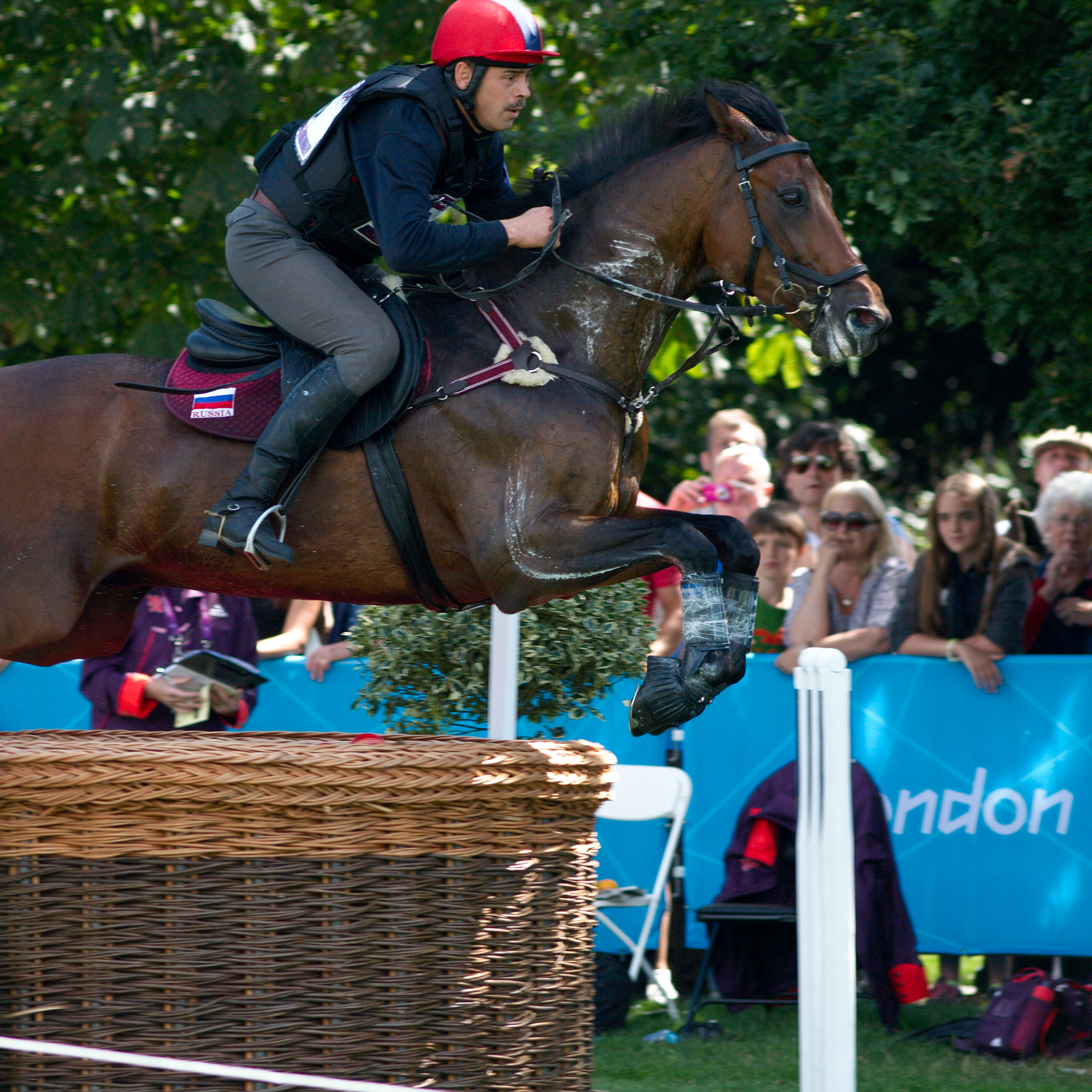
Andrei Korshunov and Fabiy competing at the 2012 Summer Olympics in London.

Andrei Korshunov is a Russian equestrian. At the 2012 Summer Olympics he competed in the Individual eventing competition.
