= Tiana Coudray =

American equestrian

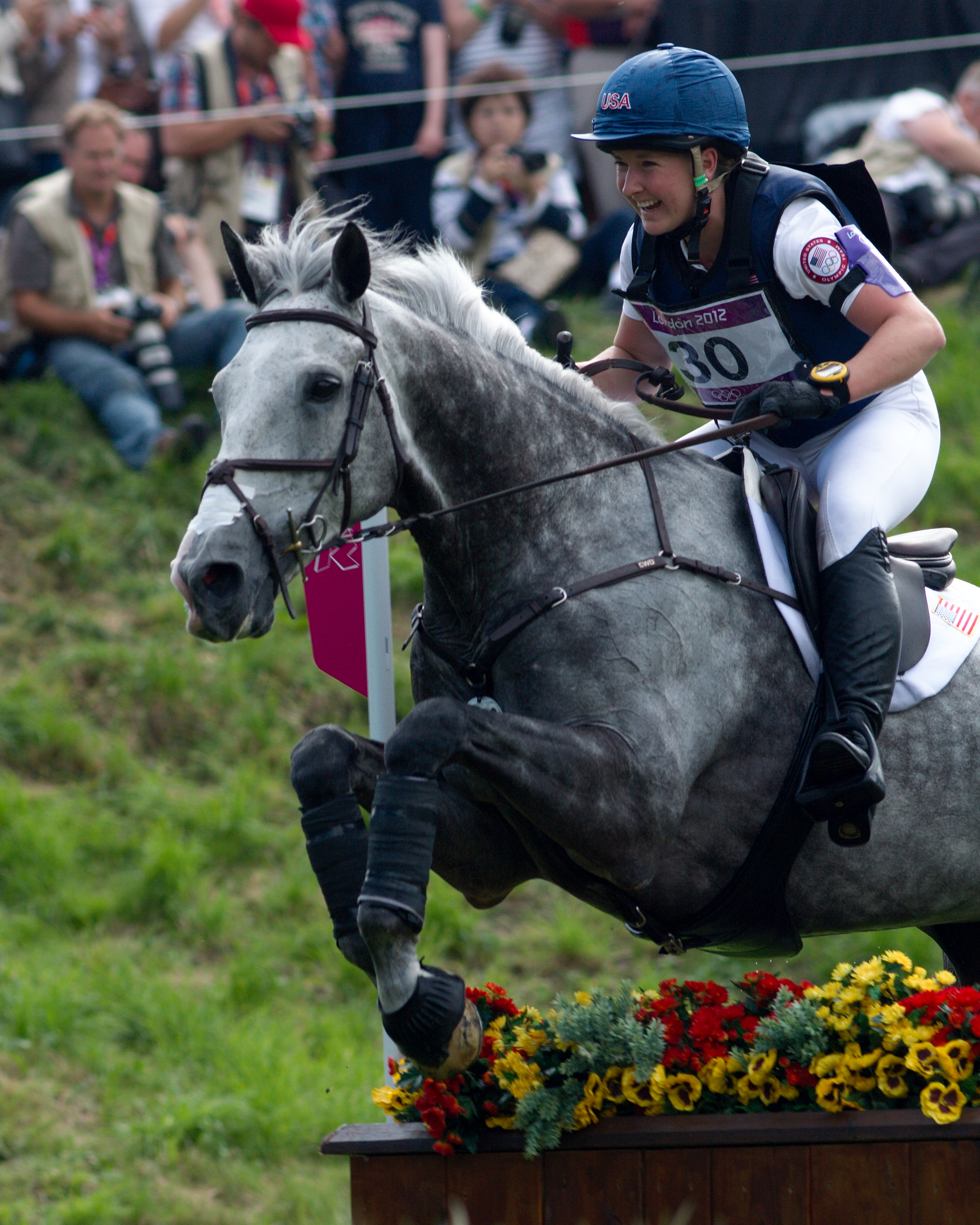
Tiana Coudray and Ringwood Magister competing at the 2012 Summer Olympics in London.

Tiana Michelle Coudray (born August 8, 1988, in Santa Barbara, California) is an American equestrian and dancer. Her usual horse is Ringwood Magister, but she has also ridden Ravens Choice and especially Saxon Legacy several times. She entered eventing at the Barbury International on July 7, 2011, finishing in 15th place. On September 8, 2011, she finished in 2nd place at the Blenheim Palace International. At Ascott in June 2012 she rode Saxon Legacy to finish 3rd in the BE100 Open and rode Ravens Choice to finish 29th in the BE100.

At the 2012 Summer Olympics she competed in the Individual eventing, finishing in 40th place on Ringwood Magister, with a score of 88.60 and she was a non-scoring member of the US team in the team event where the team finished 7th. After the Olympics she won the Novice competition at Solihull on August 18, 2010, on Saxon Legacy, and finished 9th on September 14 at the Gatcombe International on the same horse.

In dancing, as of 2012, Coudray has competed in five Irish Dancing World Championships; her highest finish is 8th place.
