= Lionel Guyon =

French equestrian

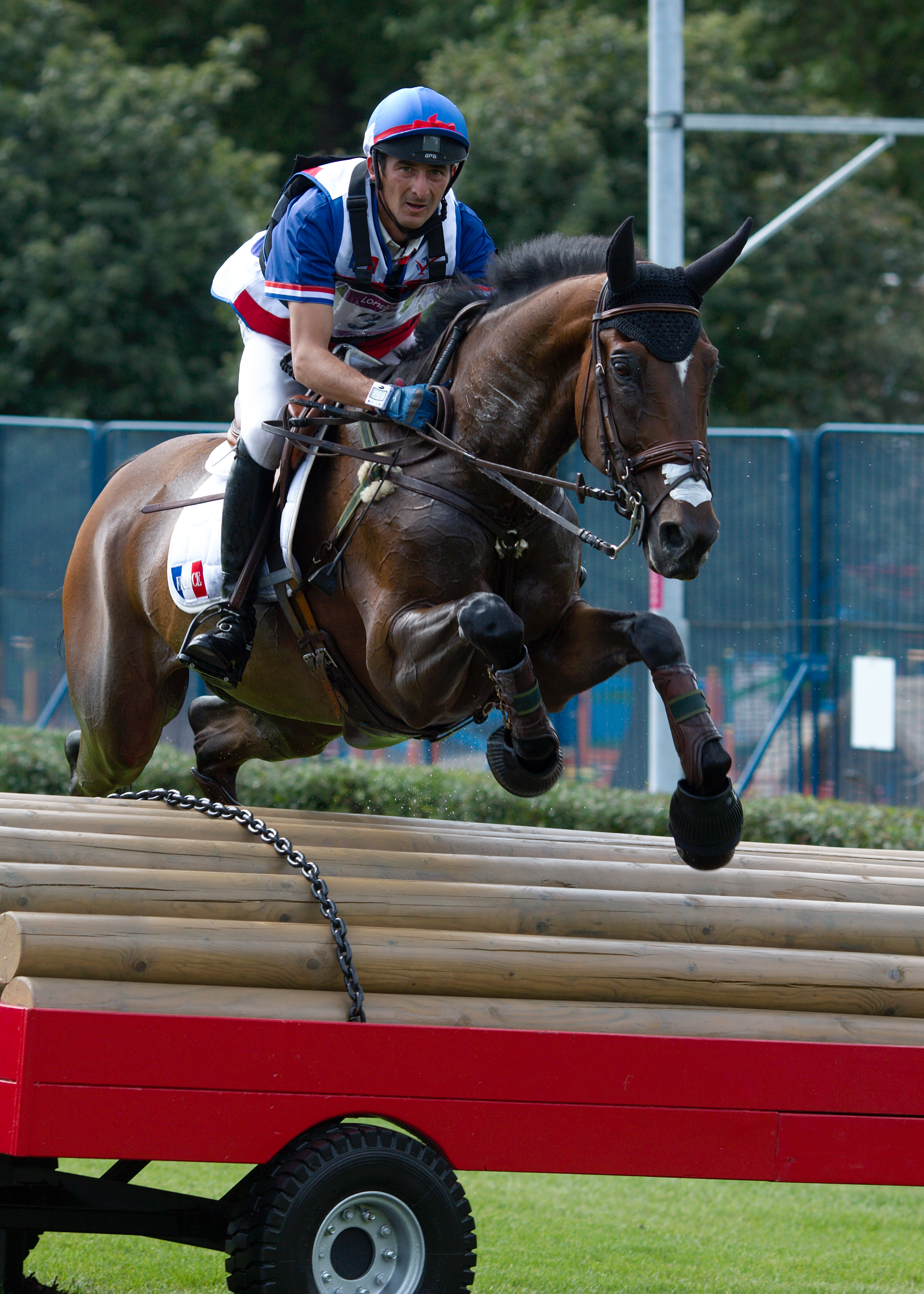
Lionel Guyon and Nemetis De Lalou competing at the 2012 Summer Olympics in London.

Lionel Guyon is a French equestrian. At the 2012 Summer Olympics he competed in the Individual eventing.
