= Vittoria Panizzon =

Italian equestrian

Personal information
- Born: September 14, 1983 (age 43) Rome

Sport
- Country: Italy
- Sport: Equestrian
Medal record
Equestrian
Representing Italy
European Championships
Bronze medal – third place	2007 Pratoni del Vivaro	Team eventing
Bronze medal – third place	2017 Strzegom	Team eventing

Vittoria Panizzon is an Italian equestrian and three-time Olympian. She has represented Italy at Pony, Junior, Young rider and Senior levels and has been a member of the national senior squad at major championships since 2005.

At the 2012 Summer Olympics she competed in the Individual eventing, while at the 2008 Olympics, she competed in both the individual and team events.

In 2025, she had a four-year suspension overturned by the Court of Arbitration for Sport. The previous year she missed the 2024 Olympics because she was suspended by Italy's national anti-doping organisation (NADO) as she was deemed to have failed to comply with the World Anti-Doping Association's (WADA) athlete whereabouts scheme by avoiding testing. However, it was deemed by CAS that it was not her fault and was entirely overturned.

== Background ==
Vittoria's Father was Italian, while her Mother is Scottish, and at the age of 17 Vittoria made the move to the UK to finish off her education and gain more eventing experience.

Vittoria graduated from Bristol University in 2005 with a degree in biology, having successfully negotiated studying and eventing a string of horses at the same time. During this time Vittoria based herself with Sarah Bullen, who has been her long term mentor ever since.

== Results ==
- 27th Individually and member of 7th placed Italian team, Tokyo Olympics 2021
- Individual Competitor for London 2012
- 16th Individually and highest placed member of 6th placed Italian team, Beijing Olympics 2008
- 7yr old British National Champion CCI** (with Borough Pennyz) 2010
- Bronze team, 8th Individually and best Italian European Championships 2007 with Rock Model
- Youngest competitor to complete 2005 & 2007 European Championships
- 17th Individually and 5th placed team 2005 European Championships
- Silver Individual Medal Young Rider European Championships 2003
- Gold Individual medal and bronze team Junior European Championships 2000
- Gold medal Italian National Junior Championships 1999 & 2000
