= Nicolas Touzaint =

French equestrian (born 1980)

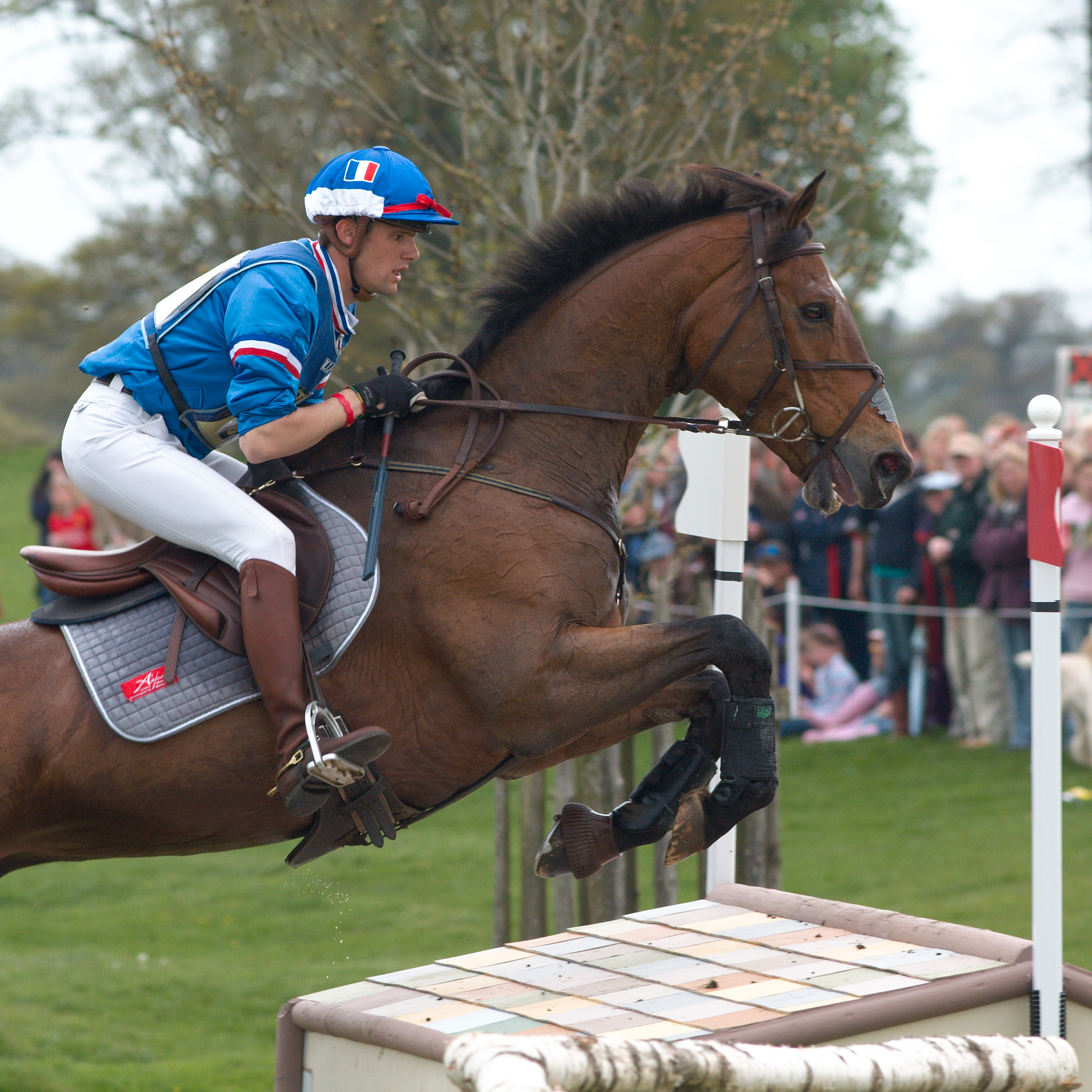
- Touzaint and Hidalgo de l'Ile at the Lancer Village during the cross-country phase of Badminton Horse Trials 2008

Personal information
- Full name: Nicolas Jean Denis Touzaint
- Born: 10 May 1980 (age 46); Angers, France
- Height: 174 cm (5 ft 9 in)
Medal record
Equestrian
Representing France
Olympic Games
Gold medal – first place	2004 Athens	Team eventing
Silver medal – second place	2024 Paris	Team eventing
Bronze medal – third place	2020 Tokyo	Team eventing
European Championships
Gold medal – first place	2003 Punchestown	Individual eventing
Gold medal – first place	2007 Pratoni del Vivaro	Individual eventing
Silver medal – second place	2003 Punchestown	Team eventing
Silver medal – second place	2005 Blenheim	Team eventing
Silver medal – second place	2007 Pratoni del Vivaro	Team eventing
Silver medal – second place	2011 Luhmühlen	Team eventing
Bronze medal – third place	2013 Malmo	Team eventing

Nicolas Jean Denis Touzaint (born 10 May 1980 in Angers) is a French professional horserider specialising in three-day eventing. He was born into a family already known for its performance in equestrianism: his father, Jean-Yves Touzaint, was champion of France eventing in 1975 and 1976. His uncle, Thierry Touzaint, is a national coach in the same discipline.

On 4 May 2008 he became the first Frenchman to win the Badminton Horse Trials.

In 2024, he received a yellow card from the FEI for "Abuse of Horse - Excessive use of whip, bit and/or spurs" for his actions at the Marbach Horse Trials.

== Awards ==
- 2003: champion of Europe at Punchestown (Ireland) and second in the team event with Galan de Sauvagère.
- 2004: Olympic champion team in the Olympic Games in Athens, 9th in individual with Galan de Sauvagère.
- 2005: Vice-champion of Europe team to Blenheim (England) with Hildago de l'Ile in 2005.
- 2005: French champion.
- 2006: French champion, after only three stages, where Nicolas Touzaint finished first in six.
- 2006: winner of the finals of the World Cup competitions complete with Galan de Sauvagère in Malmo (Sweden).
- 2006 Winner of Boekelo CCI*** in Boekelo, The Netherlands with Tatchou
- 2007: Winner of CCI ** Compiègne with Joker of Helby
- 2007: Winner of CCI *** Pratoni del Vivaro in Italy with Galan de Sauvagère
- 2007: Winner of CCI *** Fontainebleau with Galan de Sauvagère
- 2007: Winner of CCI *** Saumur with Tatchou
- 2007: Champion of France eventing
- 2007: champion of Europe in Pratoni del Vivaro (Italy) and vice-champion of Europe with a team of Galan Sauvagère
- 2007: Winner of CCI **** Pau Hidalgo with the island.
- 2007: After this season the Exceptional is No. 3 on the FEI world rankings list
- 2008: Champion of France Contest Complete with Tatchou (Pompadour 25–26 April 2008)
- 2008: winner of CCI **** Badminton (Great Britain) with Hildago de l'Ile.
