= Stefano Brecciaroli =

Italian Olympic eventing rider

Personal information
- Born: 19 November 1974 (age 51) Rome, Italy
Medal record
Equestrian
Representing Italy
European Championships
Silver medal – second place	2009 Fontainebleau	Team eventing

Stefano Brecciaroli (born 17 November 1974 in Rome, Italy) is an Italian Olympic eventing rider. He competed at four Summer Olympics (in 2004, 2008, 2012 and 2016). He best finished 5th in team eventing at the 2008 Olympics. Meanwhile, his current best individual Olympic placement is 19th position from 2012.

Brecciaroli participated at three World Equestrian Games (in 2002, 2010 and 2018) and at four European Eventing Championships (in 2003, 2007, 2009 and 2011). He won a team silver at the 2009 European Championships held in Fontainebleau, France. At the 2011 European Eventing Championship he finished 5th in the individual and 6th in the team competition.
