= Aliaksandr Faminou =

Belarusian eventing rider

Personal information
- Full name: Aliaksandr Faminou
- Nationality: Belarusian
- Born: 13 October 1984 (age 41) Gomel, Belarus

Sport
- Country: Belarus
- Sport: Equestrian

Aliaksandr Faminou (born 13 October 1984 in Gomel) is a Belarusian eventing rider. He competed at the 2012 Summer Olympics aboard Pasians, and has qualified to compete at the delayed 2020 Summer Olympics with Martinie.

Faminou took part at two European Eventing Championships (in 2013 and 2017). He placed 46th individually aboard Gilhord in 2017.
