= Denis Mesples =

French equestrian (born 1963)

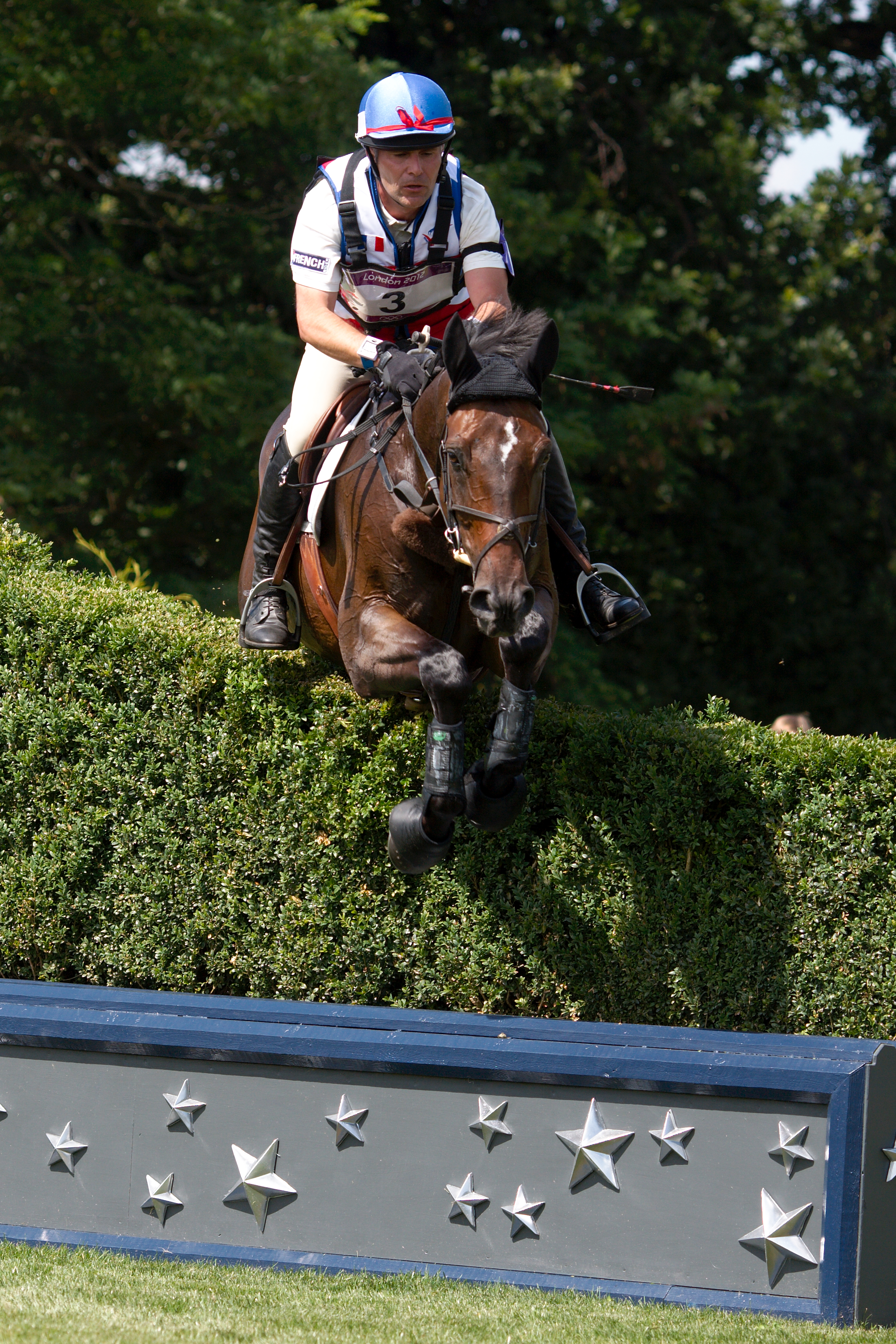
- Denis Mesples and Oregon De La Vigne competing at the 2012 Summer Olympics in London

Personal information
- Born: 21 May 1963 (age 63) Désertines, Allier, France
Medal record
Equestrian
Representing France
European Championships
Silver medal – second place	2001 Pau	Team eventing

Denis Mesples (born 21 May 1963 in Désertines, Allier) is a French equestrian. At the 2012 Summer Olympics he competed in the Individual eventing.
