= Piggy French =

British equestrian sportswoman

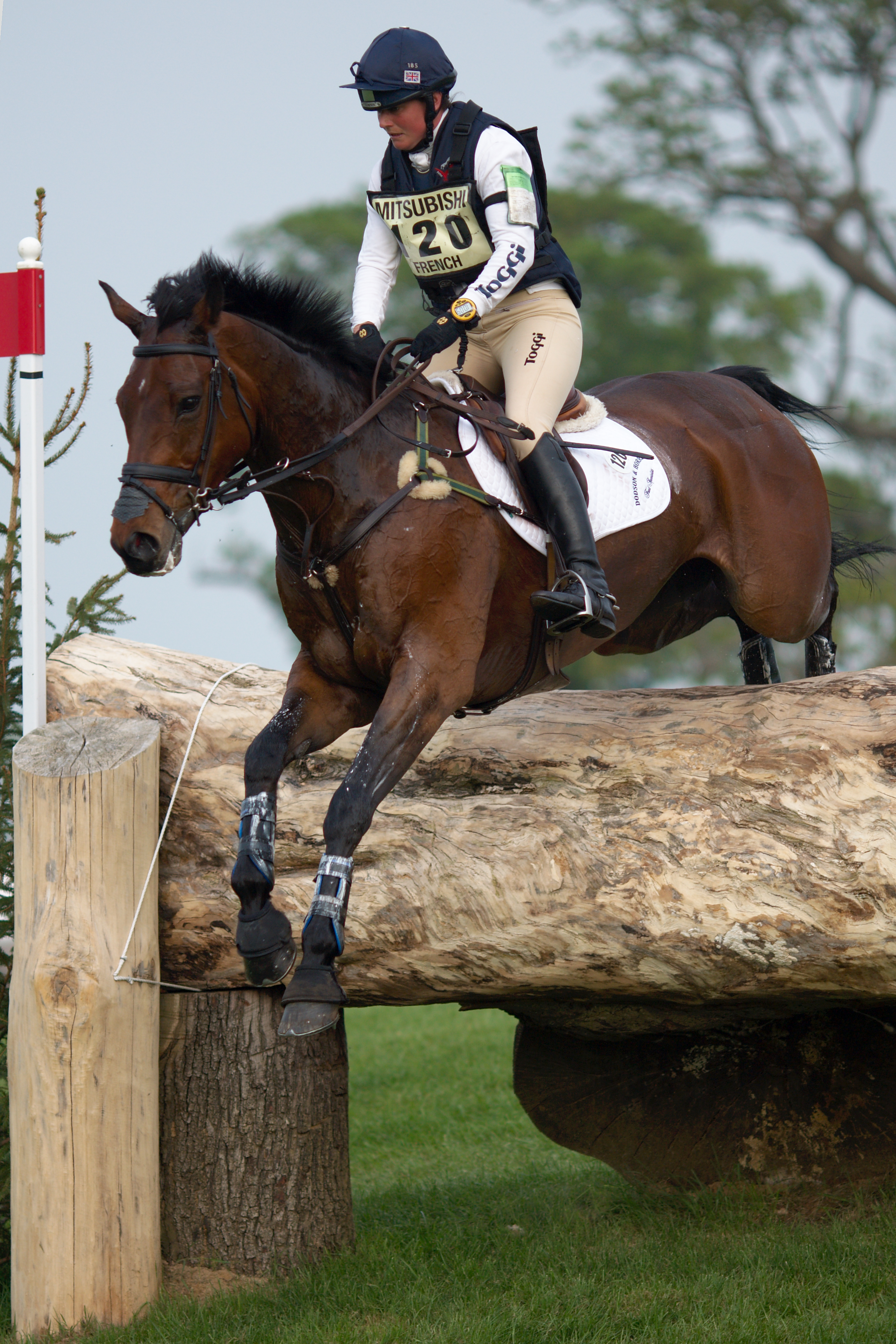
- Piggy French and Jakata at the Quarry during the cross-country phase of Badminton Horse Trials 2012

Personal information
- Full name: Georgina March
- Nationality: United Kingdom
- Discipline: Eventing
- Born: August 12, 1980 (age 44)
Medal record
Representing Great Britain
World Championships
| Gold medal – first place | 2018 Tryon | Team eventing |
European Championships
| Gold medal – first place | 2021 Avenches | Team eventing |
| Silver medal – second place | 2009 Fontainebleau | Individual eventing |
| Silver medal – second place | 2019 Luhmühlen | Team eventing |
| Silver medal – second place | 2021 Avenches | Individual eventing |
| Bronze medal – third place | 2011 Luhmühlen | Team eventing |

Georgina "Piggy" March (née French, born 12 August 1980) is a British equestrian sportswoman who competes in eventing. She won the 2019 Badminton Horse Trials and 2022 Burghley Horse Trials on Vanir Kamira, and finished second at the 2011 Badminton Horse Trials and the 2017 Burghley Horse Trials. She won Individual silver at the 2009 and 2021 European Championships and a team gold at the 2018 World Equestrian Games. She earned selection for the 2012 Olympic Games, but was forced to withdraw due to an injury to her horse, DHI Topper W. She was also selected for Tokyo 2020 Olympics, as a reserve; however, her owners did not want the horse to travel, Brookfield Inocent, if it was not to compete.

== Early life ==
French is from North Elmham in Norfolk. She gained her nickname early on when her sisters visited her in hospital and thought she looked like Piglet from the Winnie-the-Pooh stories.

== Eventing career ==
Having competed on smaller events, French's first championship level ride was in 2001 at the young riders European Championship, with a 4th place in the individual and a team gold medal. French represented Britain as an individual at the 2009 Europeans, winning the individual silver medal aboard Some Day Soon. The following year, she competed at the World Equestrian Games, finishing 14th with Jakata. This combination then finished 9th at the 2011 Europeans, as French won her first senior team medal, team bronze.

In the senior ranks, she has competed at a number of CCI 4* (now 5*) competitions, and won the CCI5*-L Badminton Horse Trials with Vanir Kamira in 2019. Previously her best place at the top level was 2nd with Jakata at Badminton in 2011. Earlier this year (2022) French ran Burghley Horse Trials with her horse, Vanir Kamira and won it. French has also won numerous international 3* events, including

Hartpury CIC3* in 2010 with Jakata

Burnham Market CIC3* in 2011 with DHI Topper W

Bleinhem CIC3* in 2011 with DHI Topper W

Houghton CIC3* in 2012 with Jakata

Barbury CIC3* in 2013 with Tinka`s Time

Burgham CIC3* in 2014 with Westwood Marinier

Chatsworth CIC3* in 2018 with Quarrycrest Echo

French's top horse, Jakata, was retired at the end of the 2014 season. She had three top horses for the 2015 season: DHI Topper W, Westwood Marinier and Tinka's Time.

== CCI 5* Results ==
Results
| Event | Kentucky (USA) late April | Badminton (UK) early May | Luhmühlen (Germany) June | Burghley (UK) early September | Pau (France) late October | Adelaide (Australia) early November |
|---|---|---|---|---|---|---|
| 2002 | | | | 31st (Flintlock II) | | |
| 2003 | | 31st (Flintlock II) | | 33rd (Done To Order) 36th (Flintlock II) | | |
| 2004 | Did not participate | | | | | |
| 2005 | | | | 17th (Done To Order) | | |
| 2006 | | | | 14th (Boherdeel Champion) EL (What A Performance) | | |
| 2007 | | EL (What A Performance) | | 12th (Paris) | | |
| 2008 | | | | RET (What A Performance) | | |
| 2009 | | | | RET (What A Performance) WD (Some Day Soon) | | |
| 2010 | | EL (Some Day Soon) | | | | |
| 2011 | | (silver) (Jakata) | 4th (Flying Machine) | | | |
| 2012 | Did not participate | | | | | |
| 2013 | | | | EL (Westwood Mariner) | | |
| 2014 | | | | 14th (Westwood Mariner) WD (Jakata) | | |
| 2015-16 | Did not participate | | | | | |
| 2017 | | | | (silver) (Vanir Kamira) | | |
| 2018 | | EL (Vanir Kamira) | 22nd (Quarrycrest Echo) | 5th (Vanir Kamira) | | |
| 2019 | 4th (Quarrycrest Echo) | (gold) (Vanir Kamira) | | (silver) (Vanir Kamira) | | |
| 2020 | Cancelled due to COVID-19 | Cancelled due to COVID-19 | Cancelled due to COVID-19 | Cancelled due to COVID-19 | (silver) (Brookfield Inocent) | Cancelled due to COVID-19 |
| 2021 | | Cancelled due to COVID-19 | | Cancelled due to COVID-19 ("replaced" by Bicton 5*: (bronze) (Vanir Kamira)) | | Cancelled due to COVID-19 |
| 2022 | | 4th (Vanir Kamira) | | (gold) (Vanir Kamira) | | |
EL = Eliminated; RET = Retired; WD = Withdrew

== International Championship Results ==
Results
| Year | Event | Horse | Placing | Notes |
|---|---|---|---|---|
| 2001 | European Young Rider Championships | Flintlock II | 1st place, gold medalist(s) | Team |
| 2001 | European Young Rider Championships | Flintlock II | 4th | Individual |
| 2007 | World Young Horse Championships | Cast Away II | 1st place, gold medalist(s) | CCI** |
| 2009 | World Young Horse Championships | Pinto de Toulgoat | 19th | CCI* |
| 2009 | European Championships | Some Day Soon | 2nd place, silver medalist(s) | Individual |
| 2010 | World Equestrian Games | Jakata | 16th | Individual |
| 2011 | World Young Horse Championships | Kiltealy Brief | 3rd place, bronze medalist(s) | CCI** |
| 2011 | European Championships | Jakata | 3rd place, bronze medalist(s) | Team |
| 2011 | European Championships | Jakata | 9th | Individual |
| 2014 | World Young Horse Championships | Cooley Dream | 3rd place, bronze medalist(s) | CCI* |
| 2014 | World Young Horse Championships | Carpe Diem IV | 5th | CCI** |
| 2015 | World Young Horse Championships | Jump Jet | 13th | CCI* |
| 2015 | World Young Horse Championships | Morswood | 12th | CCI** |
| 2017 | European Championships | Quarrycrest Echo | 27th | Individual |
| 2018 | World Equestrian Games | Quarrycrest Echo | 1st place, gold medalist(s) | Team |
| 2018 | World Equestrian Games | Quarrycrest Echo | 10th | Individual |
| 2019 | European Championships | Quarrycrest Echo | 2nd place, silver medalist(s) | Team |
| 2019 | European Championships | Quarrycrest Echo | 15th | Individual |
| 2019 | World Young Horse Championships | Cooley Lancer | 1st place, gold medalist(s) | CCI** |
| 2021 | European Championships | Brookfield Inocent | 1st place, gold medalist(s) | Team |
| 2021 | European Championships | Brookfield Inocent | 2nd place, silver medalist(s) | Individual |
EL = Eliminated; RET = Retired; WD = Withdrew

== Notable Horses ==
- Flintlock II
  - 2001 Young Rider European Championships - team gold, individual 4th
- Some Day Soon
  - 2009 European Championships - individual silver
- Jakarta
  - 2010 World Equestrian Games - individual 16th
  - 2011 Badminton CCI5* runner up
  - 2011 European Championships - team bronze, individual 9th
- Quarryquest Echo
  - 2018 World Equestrian Games - team gold, individual 10th
  - 2019 European Championships - team silver, individual 15th
- Vanir Kamira
  - 2017 & 19 Burghley CCI5* runner up
  - 2019 Badminton CCI5* winner
  - 2021 Bicton CCI5* third place
- Brookfield Inocent
  - 2020 Pau CCI5* runner up
  - 2021 European Championships - team gold, individual silver
