= Malin Petersen =

Swedish equestrian

Personal information
- Born: January 31, 1981 (age 45) Alva
Medal record
Equestrian
Representing Sweden
European Championships
Bronze medal – third place	2021 Avenches	Team eventing

Malin Petersen (born January 31, 1981, in Alva, Sweden) is a Swedish equestrian. At the 2012 Summer Olympics she competed in the Individual eventing.
