= Joseph Murphy (equestrian) =

Irish equestrian

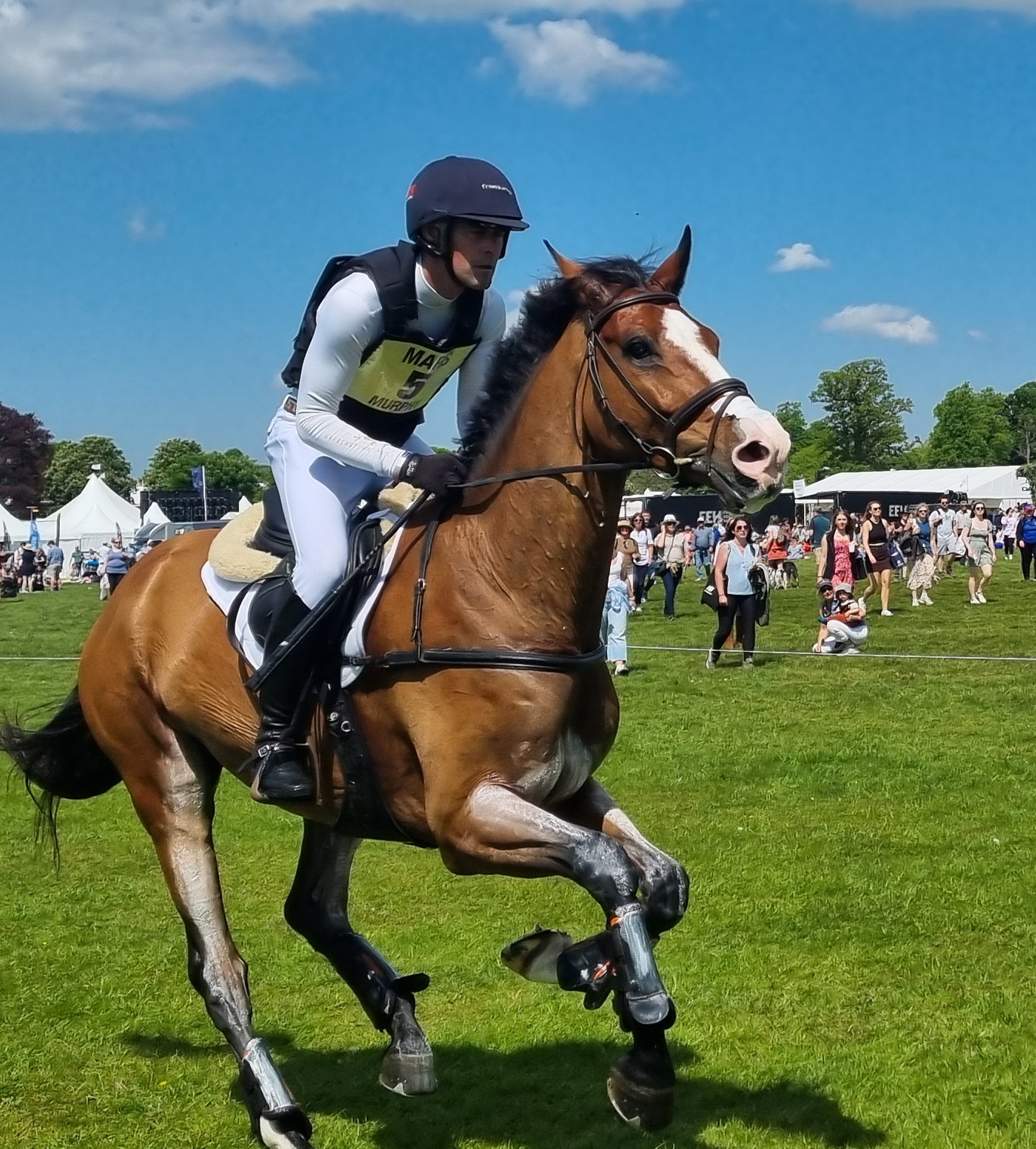
- Joseph Murphy at the Badminton Horse Trials 2025

Personal information
- Born: 6 August 1976 (age 49) Mullingar, Ireland

Joseph Murphy (born 6 August 1976 in Mullingar, Ireland) is an Irish Olympic eventing rider. He competed at the 2012 Summer Olympics where he finished 14th in the individual and 5th in the team eventing competition. He postponed his wedding to allow him to take part.

Murphy also took part at the 2014 World Equestrian Games and at four editions of European Eventing Championships (in 2011, 2013, 2015, 2017 & 2023 Haras de Pin, France)
