= 2013 European Eventing Championships =

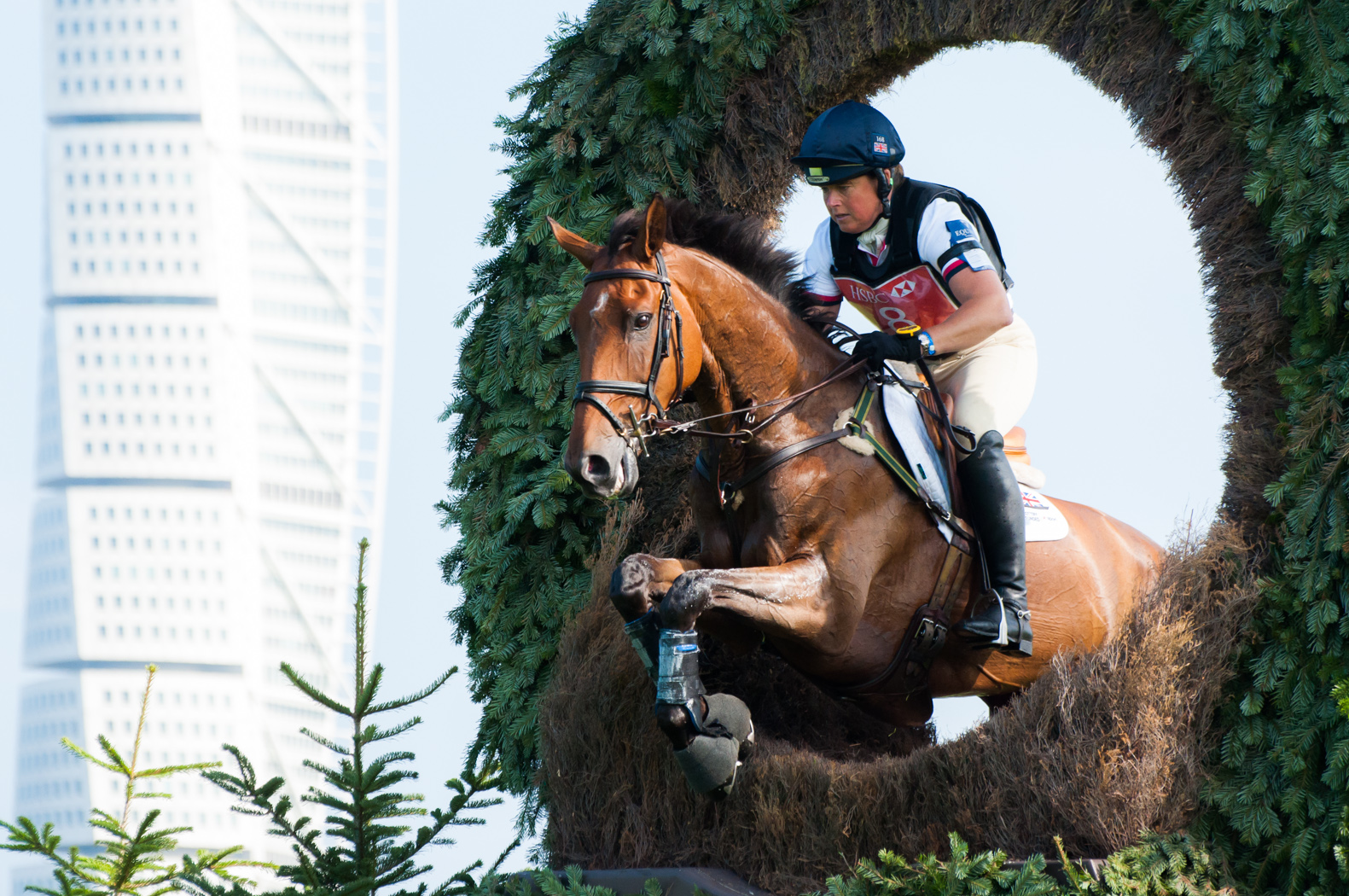
Pippa Funnell with Mirage d'Elle at the 2013 European Eventing Championship

The 2013 European Eventing Championship was held from August 29 to September 1, 2013, in Malmö, Sweden.

== Results ==
- Venue: Malmö, Sweden
- Team gold: Germany
- Team silver: Sweden
- Team bronze: France
- Individual gold: (Germany) Michael Jung/Halunke FBW (GER)
- Individual silver: (Germany) Ingrid Klimke/FRH Escada JS (GER)
- Individual bronze: (United Kingdom) William Fox-Pitt/Chilli Morning (GBR)
