= Equestrian at the 2012 Summer Olympics – Team eventing =

Team eventing at the Games of the XXX Olympiad
- Venue: Greenwich Park
- Date: 28–31 July 2012
- Competitors: 62 from 13 nations

Medalists
| 1st place, gold medalist(s) | | Peter Thomsen; Dirk Schrade; Ingrid Klimke; Sandra Auffarth; Michael Jung | Germany |
| 2nd place, silver medalist(s) | | Nicola Wilson; Mary King; Zara Phillips; Kristina Cook; William Fox-Pitt | Great Britain |
| 3rd place, bronze medalist(s) | | Jonelle Richards; Jonathan Paget; Caroline Powell; Andrew Nicholson; Mark Todd | New Zealand |

The team eventing in equestrian at the 2012 Olympic Games in London was held at Greenwich Park from 28 to 31 July.

The German team of Peter Thomsen, Dirk Schrade, Ingrid Klimke, Sandra Auffarth and Michael Jung won the gold medal. Great Britain won the silver medal and New Zealand took bronze.

== Competition format ==
The team and individual eventing competitions used the same scores. Eventing consisted of a dressage test, a cross-country test, and a jumping test. The jumping test had two rounds, with only the first used for the team competition. Team eventing final scores were the sum of the three best overall individual scores (adding the three components) from the five-pair teams.

== Schedule ==
All times are British Summer Time (UTC+1)

| Date | Time | Round |
|---|---|---|
| Saturday, 28 July 2012; Sunday, 29 July 2012 | 10:00 | Dressage |
| Monday, 30 July 2012 | 12:30 | Cross-country |
| Tuesday, 31 July 2012 | 10:30 | Jumping |

== Results ==
=== Standings after dressage ===
| Nation | Individual results | | | Team penalties | Team rank |
| Nation | Rider | Horse | Penalties | Team penalties | Team rank |
|---|---|---|---|---|---|
| Germany | Peter Thomsen | Barny | 58.50 | 119.10 | 1 |
| Germany | Dirk Schrade | King Artus | 39.80 | 119.10 | 1 |
| Germany | Ingrid Klimke | Butts Abraxxas | 39.30 | 119.10 | 1 |
| Germany | Sandra Auffarth | Opgun Luovo | 40.00 | 119.10 | 1 |
| Germany | Michael Jung | Sam | 40.60 | 119.10 | 1 |
| Australia | Christopher Burton | HP Leilani | 46.10 | 122.10 | 2 |
| Australia | Sam Griffiths | Happy Times | 45.40 | 122.10 | 2 |
| Australia | Andrew Hoy | Rutherglen | 41.70 | 122.10 | 2 |
| Australia | Lucinda Fredericks | Flying Fish | 40.00 | 122.10 | 2 |
| Australia | Clayton Fredericks | Bendigo | 40.40 | 122.10 | 2 |
| Great Britain | Nicola Wilson | Opposition Buzz | 51.70 | 127.00 | 3 |
| Great Britain | Mary King | Imperial Cavalier | 40.90 | 127.00 | 3 |
| Great Britain | Zara Phillips | High Kingdom | 46.10 | 127.00 | 3 |
| Great Britain | Kristina Cook | Miners Frolic | 42.00 | 127.00 | 3 |
| Great Britain | William Fox-Pitt | Lionheart | 44.10 | 127.00 | 3 |
| Sweden | Linda Algotsson | La Fair | 59.80 | 128.20 | 4 |
| Sweden | Ludvig Svennerstål | Shamwari | 43.70 | 128.20 | 4 |
| Sweden | Sara Algotsson Ostholt | Wega | 39.30 | 128.20 | 4 |
| Sweden | Niklas Lindbäck | Mister Pooh | 45.20 | 128.20 | 4 |
| Sweden | Malin Petersen | Sofarsogood | 60.40 | 128.20 | 4 |
| New Zealand | Jonelle Richards | Flintstar | 56.70 | 128.20 | 4 |
| New Zealand | Jonathan Paget | Clifton Promise | 44.10 | 128.20 | 4 |
| New Zealand | Caroline Powell | Lenamore | 52.20 | 128.20 | 4 |
| New Zealand | Andrew Nicholson | Nereo | 45.00 | 128.20 | 4 |
| New Zealand | Mark Todd | Campino | 39.10 | 128.20 | 4 |
| Japan | Toshiyuki Tanaka | Marquis de Plescop | 55.00 | 130.70 | 6 |
| Japan | Takayuki Yumira | Latina | 58.50 | 130.70 | 6 |
| Japan | Atsushi Negishi | Pretty Darling | 50.40 | 130.70 | 6 |
| Japan | Kenki Sato | Chippieh | 42.20 | 130.70 | 6 |
| Japan | Yoshiaki Oiwa | Noonday de Conde | 38.10 | 130.70 | 6 |
| United States | Boyd Martin | Otis Barbotiere | 50.70 | 138.80 | 7 |
| United States | Karen O'Connor | Mr. Medicott | 48.20 | 138.80 | 7 |
| United States | Tiana Coudray | Ringwood Magister | 52.00 | 138.80 | 7 |
| United States | William Coleman | Twizzel | 46.30 | 138.80 | 7 |
| United States | Phillip Dutton | Mystery Whisper | 44.30 | 138.80 | 7 |
| Belgium | Virginie Caulier | Nepal du Sudre | 48.30 | 139.00 | 8 |
| Belgium | Carl Bouckaert | Cyrano Z | 53.00 | 139.00 | 8 |
| Belgium | Marc Rigouts | Dunkas | 50.70 | 139.00 | 8 |
| Belgium | Joris Vanspringel | Lully des Aulnes | 51.90 | 139.00 | 8 |
| Belgium | Karin Donckers | Gazelle de la Brasserie | 40.00 | 139.00 | 8 |
| France | Denis Mesples | Oregon de la Vigne | 61.50 | 142.90 | 9 |
| France | Aurelien Kahn | Cadiz | 55.90 | 142.90 | 9 |
| France | Lionel Guyon | Nemetis de Lalou | 50.90 | 142.90 | 9 |
| France | Donatien Schauly | Ocarina du Chanois | 44.40 | 142.90 | 9 |
| France | Nicolas Touzaint | Hildago de L'Ile | 47.60 | 142.90 | 9 |
| Ireland | Michael Ryan | Ballylynch Adventure | 60.20 | 152.10 | 10 |
| Ireland | Aoife Clark | Master Crusoe | 48.90 | 152.10 | 10 |
| Ireland | Joseph Murphy | Electric Cruise | 55.60 | 152.10 | 10 |
| Ireland | Camilla Speirs | Portersize Just a Jiff | 47.60 | 152.10 | 10 |
| Ireland | Mark Kyle | Coolio | 58.70 | 152.10 | 10 |
| Canada | Michelle Mueller | Amistad | 57.00 | 154.10 | 11 |
| Canada | Hawley Bennett-Awad | Gin & Juice | 48.70 | 154.10 | 11 |
| Canada | Peter Barry | Kilrodan Abbott | 61.70 | 154.10 | 11 |
| Canada | Jessica Phoenix | Exponential | 54.80 | 154.10 | 11 |
| Canada | Rebecca Howard | Riddle Master | 50.60 | 154.10 | 11 |
| Netherlands | Tim Lips | Oncarlos | 51.70 | 154.50 | 12 |
| Netherlands | Andrew Heffernan | Millthyme Corolla | 50.60 | 154.50 | 12 |
| Netherlands | Elaine Pen | Vira | 52.20 | 154.50 | 12 |
| Brazil | Marcio Carvalho | Josephine | 58.50 | 170.40 | 13 |
| Brazil | Serguei Fofanoff | Barbara | 72.00 | 170.40 | 13 |
| Brazil | Marcelo Tosi | Eleda All Black | 58.00 | 170.40 | 13 |
| Brazil | Ruy Fonseca | Tom Bombadill Too | 53.90 | 170.40 | 13 |

Note: The team penalties given above are for the top three in each team at this stage and may not tally with the final total scores. The final results are determined by adding the total scores of the top three team members at the end of the competition.

=== Standings after cross-country ===
| Nation | Individual results | | | | Total team penalties | Team rank |
| Nation | Rider | Horse | Cross country penalties | Total penalties | Total team penalties | Team rank |
|---|---|---|---|---|---|---|
| Germany | Peter Thomsen | Barny | 5.20 | 63.70 | 124.70 | 1 |
| Germany | Dirk Schrade | King Artus | 10.80 | 50.60 | 124.70 | 1 |
| Germany | Ingrid Klimke | Butts Abraxxas | 0.00 | 39.30 | 124.70 | 1 |
| Germany | Sandra Auffarth | Opgun Luovo | 4.80 | 44.80 | 124.70 | 1 |
| Germany | Michael Jung | Sam | 0.00 | 40.60 | 124.70 | 1 |
| Great Britain | Nicola Wilson | Opposition Buzz | 0.00 | 51.70 | 130.20 | 2 |
| Great Britain | Mary King | Imperial Cavalier | 1.20 | 42.10 | 130.20 | 2 |
| Great Britain | Zara Phillips | High Kingdom | 0.00 | 46.10 | 130.20 | 2 |
| Great Britain | Kristina Cook | Miners Frolic | 0.00 | 42.00 | 130.20 | 2 |
| Great Britain | William Fox-Pitt | Lionheart | 9.20 | 53.30 | 130.20 | 2 |
| Sweden | Linda Algotsson | La Fair | 20.00 | 79.80 | 131.40 | 3 |
| Sweden | Ludwig Svennerstål | Shamwari | 0.40 | 44.10 | 131.40 | 3 |
| Sweden | Sara Algotsson Ostholt | Wega | 0.00 | 39.30 | 131.40 | 3 |
| Sweden | Niklas Lindbäck | Mister Pooh | 2.80 | 48.00 | 131.40 | 3 |
| Sweden | Malin Petersen | Sofarsogood | 0.80 | 61.20 | 131.40 | 3 |
| New Zealand | Jonelle Richards | Flintstar | 6.00 | 62.70 | 133.40 | 4 |
| New Zealand | Jonathan Paget | Clifton Promise | 4.80 | 48.90 | 133.40 | 4 |
| New Zealand | Caroline Powell | Lenamore | 1.60 | 53.80 | 133.40 | 4 |
| New Zealand | Andrew Nicholson | Nereo | 0.00 | 45.00 | 133.40 | 4 |
| New Zealand | Mark Todd | Campino | 0.40 | 39.50 | 133.40 | 4 |
| United States | Boyd Martin | Otis Barbotiere | 3.60 | 54.30 | 155.20 | 5 |
| United States | Karen O'Connor | Mr. Medicott | 5.60 | 53.80 | 155.20 | 5 |
| United States | Tiana Coudray | Ringwood Magister | 25.60 | 77.60 | 155.20 | 5 |
| United States | William Coleman | Twizzel | 36.40 | 82.70 | 155.20 | 5 |
| United States | Phillip Dutton | Mystery Whisper | 2.80 | 47.10 | 155.20 | 5 |
| Australia | Christopher Burton | HP Leilani | 0.00 | 46.10 | 173.40 | 6 |
| Australia | Sam Griffiths | Happy Times | Eliminated | 1000.00 | 173.40 | 6 |
| Australia | Andrew Hoy | Rutherglen | 7.60 | 49.30 | 173.40 | 6 |
| Australia | Lucinda Fredericks | Flying Fish | 38.00 | 78.00 | 173.40 | 6 |
| Australia | Clayton Fredericks | Bendigo | Eliminated | 1000.00 | 173.40 | 6 |
| France | Denis Mesples | Oregon de la Vigne | 46.00 | 107.50 | 177.70 | 7 |
| France | Aurelien Kahn | Cadiz | 39.60 | 95.50 | 177.70 | 7 |
| France | Lionel Guyon | Nemetis de Lalou | 20.00 | 70.90 | 177.70 | 7 |
| France | Donatien Schauly | Ocarina du Chanois | 7.20 | 51.60 | 177.70 | 7 |
| France | Nicolas Touzaint | Hildago de L'Ile | 7.60 | 55.20 | 177.70 | 7 |
| Ireland | Michael Ryan | Ballylynch Adventure | Eliminated | 1000.00 | 178.80 | 8 |
| Ireland | Aoife Clark | Master Crusoe | 3.60 | 52.50 | 178.80 | 8 |
| Ireland | Joseph Murphy | Electric Cruise | 4.80 | 60.40 | 178.80 | 8 |
| Ireland | Camilla Speirs | Portersize Just a Jiff | Eliminated | 1000.00 | 178.80 | 8 |
| Ireland | Mark Kyle | Coolio | 7.20 | 65.90 | 178.80 | 8 |
| Belgium | Virginie Caulier | Nepal du Sudre | 21.20 | 69.50 | 185.80 | 9 |
| Belgium | Carl Bouckaert | Cyrano Z | Eliminated | 1000.00 | 185.80 | 9 |
| Belgium | Marc Rigouts | Dunkas | 56.80 | 107.50 | 185.80 | 9 |
| Belgium | Joris Vanspringel | Lully des Aulnes | 12.80 | 64.70 | 185.80 | 9 |
| Belgium | Karin Donckers | Gazelle de la Brasserie | 11.60 | 51.60 | 185.80 | 9 |
| Brazil | Marcio Carvalho | Josephine | 42.80 | 101.30 | 269.20 | 10 |
| Brazil | Serguei Fofanoff | Barbara | Eliminated | 1000.00 | 269.20 | 10 |
| Brazil | Marcelo Tosi | Eleda All Black | 29.60 | 87.60 | 269.20 | 10 |
| Brazil | Ruy Fonseca | Tom Bombadill Too | 46.40 | 80.30 | 269.20 | 10 |
| Netherlands | Tim Lips | Oncarlos | 22.00 | 73.70 | 1136.70 | 11 |
| Netherlands | Andrew Heffernan | Millthyme Corolla | 12.40 | 63.00 | 1136.70 | 11 |
| Netherlands | Elaine Pen | Vira | Eliminated | 1000.00 | 1136.70 | 11 |
| Canada | Michelle Mueller | Amistad | 63.20 | 120.20 | 1177.40 | 12 |
| Canada | Hawley Bennett-Awad | Gin & Juice | Eliminated | 1000.00 | 1177.40 | 12 |
| Canada | Peter Barry | Kilrodan Abbott | Eliminated | 1000.00 | 1177.40 | 12 |
| Canada | Jessica Phoenix | Exponential | 2.40 | 57.20 | 1177.40 | 12 |
| Canada | Rebecca Howard | Riddle Master | Eliminated | 1000.00 | 1177.40 | 12 |
| Japan | Toshiyuki Tanaka | Marquis de Plescop | 60.00 | 115.00 | 1191.00 | 13 |
| Japan | Takayuki Yumira | Latina | Eliminated | 1000.00 | 1191.00 | 13 |
| Japan | Atsushi Negishi | Pretty Darling | 25.60 | 76.00 | 1191.00 | 13 |
| Japan | Kenki Sato | Chippieh | Eliminated | 1000.00 | 1191.00 | 13 |
| Japan | Yoshiaki Oiwa | Noonday de Conde | Eliminated | 1000.00 | 1191.00 | 13 |

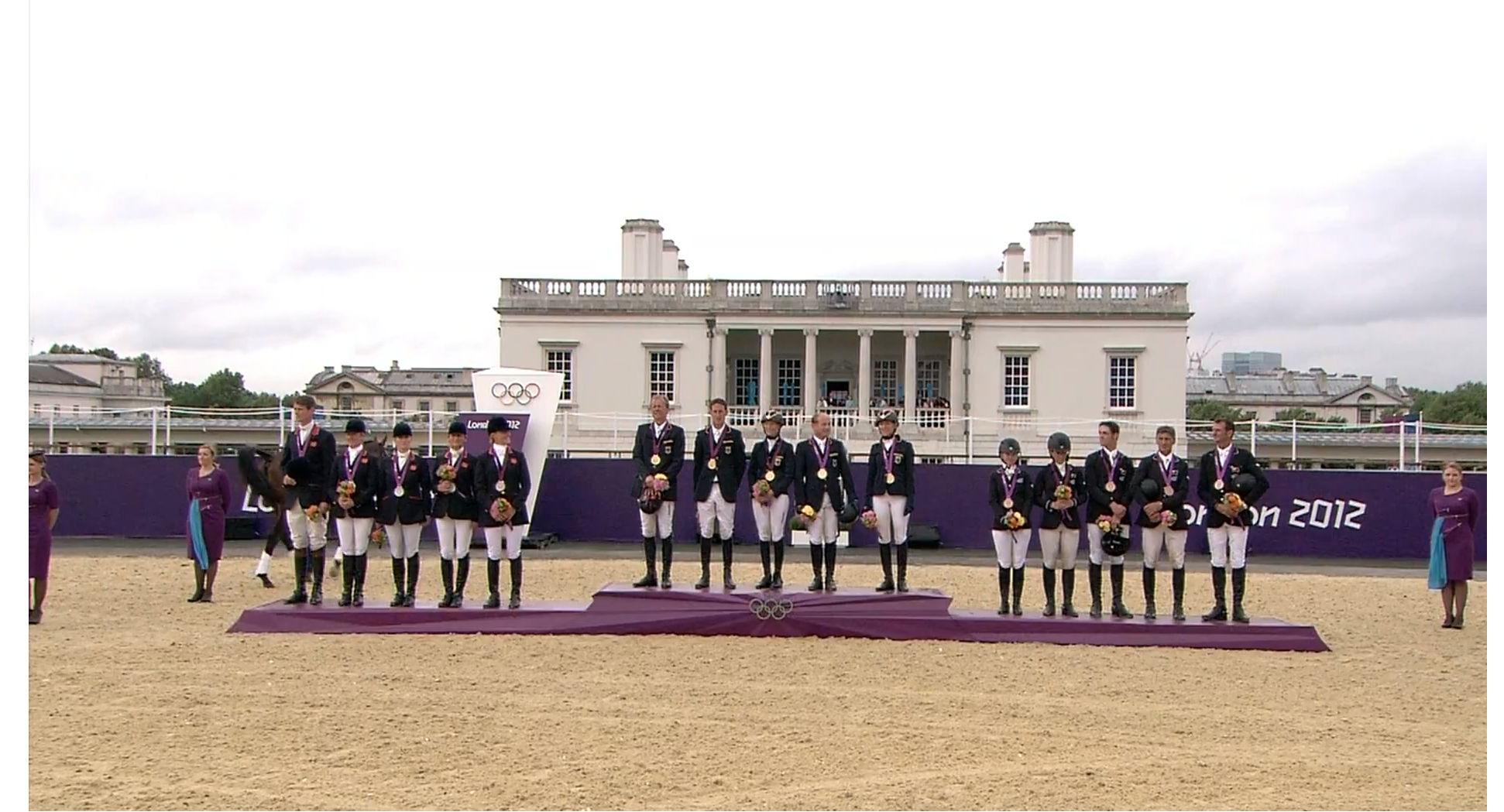
Medalists for the team Eventing competition

Note: The team penalties given above are for the top three in each team at this stage and may not tally with the final total scores. The final results are determined by adding the total scores of the top three team members at the end of the competition.

=== Standings after jumping (final standings) ===
Final results below, determined by combining the three best overall scores for each team.

| Nation | Individual results | | | | Total team Penalties | Team rank |
| Nation | Rider | Horse | Jumping Penalties | Total Penalties | Total team Penalties | Team rank |
|---|---|---|---|---|---|---|
| Germany | Peter Thomsen | Barny | 8.00 | ~~71.70~~ | 133.70 | 1st place, gold medalist(s) |
| Germany | Dirk Schrade | King Artus | 0.00 | ~~50.60~~ | 133.70 | 1st place, gold medalist(s) |
| Germany | Ingrid Klimke | Butts Abraxxas | 9.00 | 48.30 | 133.70 | 1st place, gold medalist(s) |
| Germany | Sandra Auffarth | Opgun Luovo | 0.00 | 44.80 | 133.70 | 1st place, gold medalist(s) |
| Germany | Michael Jung | Sam | 0.00 | 40.60 | 133.70 | 1st place, gold medalist(s) |
| Great Britain | Nicola Wilson | Opposition Buzz | 4.00 | ~~55.70~~ | 138.20 | 2nd place, silver medalist(s) |
| Great Britain | Mary King | Imperial Cavalier | 0.00 | 42.10 | 138.20 | 2nd place, silver medalist(s) |
| Great Britain | Zara Phillips | High Kingdom | 7.00 | 53.10 | 138.20 | 2nd place, silver medalist(s) |
| Great Britain | Kristina Cook | Miners Frolic | 1.00 | 43.00 | 138.20 | 2nd place, silver medalist(s) |
| Great Britain | William Fox-Pitt | Lionheart | 0.00 | ~~53.30~~ | 138.20 | 2nd place, silver medalist(s) |
| New Zealand | Jonelle Richards | Flintstar | 9.00 | ~~71.70~~ | 144.40 | 3rd place, bronze medalist(s) |
| New Zealand | Jonathan Paget | Clifton Promise | 4.00 | 52.90 | 144.40 | 3rd place, bronze medalist(s) |
| New Zealand | Caroline Powell | Lenamore | 4.00 | ~~57.80~~ | 144.40 | 3rd place, bronze medalist(s) |
| New Zealand | Andrew Nicholson | Nereo | 0.00 | 45.00 | 144.40 | 3rd place, bronze medalist(s) |
| New Zealand | Mark Todd | Campino | 7.00 | 46.50 | 144.40 | 3rd place, bronze medalist(s) |
| Sweden | Linda Algotsson | La Fair | 0.00 | ~~79.80~~ | 148.40 | 4 |
| Sweden | Ludvig Svennerstål | Shamwari | 8.00 | 52.10 | 148.40 | 4 |
| Sweden | Sara Algotsson Ostholt | Wega | 0.00 | 39.30 | 148.40 | 4 |
| Sweden | Niklas Lindbäck | Mister Pooh | 9.00 | 57.00 | 148.40 | 4 |
| Sweden | Malin Petersen | Sofarsogood | 6.00 | ~~67.00~~ | 148.40 | 4 |
| Ireland | Michael Ryan | Ballylynch Adventure | Eliminated | ~~1000.00~~ | 184.80 | 5 |
| Ireland | Aoife Clark | Master Crusoe | 0.00 | 52.50 | 184.80 | 5 |
| Ireland | Joseph Murphy | Electric Cruise | 0.00 | 60.40 | 184.80 | 5 |
| Ireland | Camilla Speirs | Portersize Just a Jiff | Eliminated | ~~1000.00~~ | 184.80 | 5 |
| Ireland | Mark Kyle | Coolio | 6.00 | 71.90 | 184.80 | 5 |
| Australia | Christopher Burton | HP Leilani | 4.00 | 50.10 | 186.40 | 6 |
| Australia | Sam Griffiths | Happy Times | Eliminated | ~~1000.00~~ | 186.40 | 6 |
| Australia | Andrew Hoy | Rutherglen | 8.00 | 57.30 | 186.40 | 6 |
| Australia | Lucinda Fredericks | Flying Fish | 1.00 | 79.00 | 186.40 | 6 |
| Australia | Clayton Fredericks | Bendigo | Eliminated | ~~1000.00~~ | 186.40 | 6 |
| United States | Boyd Martin | Otis Barbotiere | Withdrew | ~~1000.00~~ | 208.60 | 7 |
| United States | Karen O'Connor | Mr. Medicott | 0.00 | 53.80 | 208.60 | 7 |
| United States | Tiana Coudray | Ringwood Magister | 11.00 | ~~88.60~~ | 208.60 | 7 |
| United States | William Coleman | Twizzel | 2.00 | 84.70 | 208.60 | 7 |
| United States | Phillip Dutton | Mystery Whisper | 23.00 | 70.10 | 208.60 | 7 |
| France | Denis Mesples | Oregon de la Vigne | 19.00 | ~~126.50~~ | 230.60 | 8 |
| France | Aurelien Kahn | Cadiz | 7.00 | 102.50 | 230.60 | 8 |
| France | Lionel Guyon | Nemetis de Lalou | 0.00 | 70.90 | 230.60 | 8 |
| France | Donatien Schauly | Ocarina du Chanois | Withdrew | ~~1000.00~~ | 230.60 | 8 |
| France | Nicolas Touzaint | Hildago de L'Ile | 2.00 | 57.20 | 230.60 | 8 |
| Brazil | Marcio Carvalho | Josephine | 4.00 | 105.30 | 295.20 | 9 |
| Brazil | Serguei Fofanoff | Barbara | Eliminated | ~~1000.00~~ | 295.20 | 9 |
| Brazil | Marcelo Tosi | Eleda All Black | 10.00 | 97.60 | 295.20 | 9 |
| Brazil | Ruy Fonseca | Tom Bombadill Too | 12.00 | 92.30 | 295.20 | 9 |
| Belgium | Virginie Caulier | Nepal du Sudre | 9.00 | 78.50 | 1134.10 | 10 |
| Belgium | Carl Bouckaert | Cyrano Z | Eliminated | 1000.00 | 1134.10 | 10 |
| Belgium | Marc Rigouts | Dunkas | Withdrew | ~~1000.00~~ | 1134.10 | 10 |
| Belgium | Joris Vanspringel | Lully des Aulnes | Withdrew | ~~1000.00~~ | 1134.10 | 10 |
| Belgium | Karin Donckers | Gazelle de la Brasserie | 4.00 | 55.60 | 1134.10 | 10 |
| Netherlands | Tim Lips | Oncarlos | 13.00 | 86.70 | 1161.70 | 11 |
| Netherlands | Andrew Heffernan | Millthyme Corolla | 12.00 | 75.00 | 1161.70 | 11 |
| Netherlands | Elaine Pen | Vira | Eliminated | 1000.00 | 1161.70 | 11 |
| Japan | Toshiyuki Tanaka | Marquis de Plescop | 4.00 | 119.00 | 1207.00 | 12 |
| Japan | Takayuki Yumira | Latina | Eliminated | ~~1000.00~~ | 1207.00 | 12 |
| Japan | Atsushi Negishi | Pretty Darling | 12.00 | 88.00 | 1207.00 | 12 |
| Japan | Kenki Sato | Chippieh | Eliminated | ~~1000.00~~ | 1207.00 | 12 |
| Japan | Yoshiaki Oiwa | Noonday de Conde | Eliminated | 1000.00 | 1207.00 | 12 |
| Canada | Michelle Mueller | Amistad | Withdrew | ~~1000.00~~ | 2071.20 | 13 |
| Canada | Hawley Bennett-Awad | Gin & Juice | Eliminated | ~~1000.00~~ | 2071.20 | 13 |
| Canada | Peter Barry | Kilrodan Abbott | Eliminated | 1000.00 | 2071.20 | 13 |
| Canada | Jessica Phoenix | Exponential | 14.00 | 71.20 | 2071.20 | 13 |
| Canada | Rebecca Howard | Riddle Master | Eliminated | 1000.00 | 2071.20 | 13 |
