= Tim Price =

New Zealand Equestrian

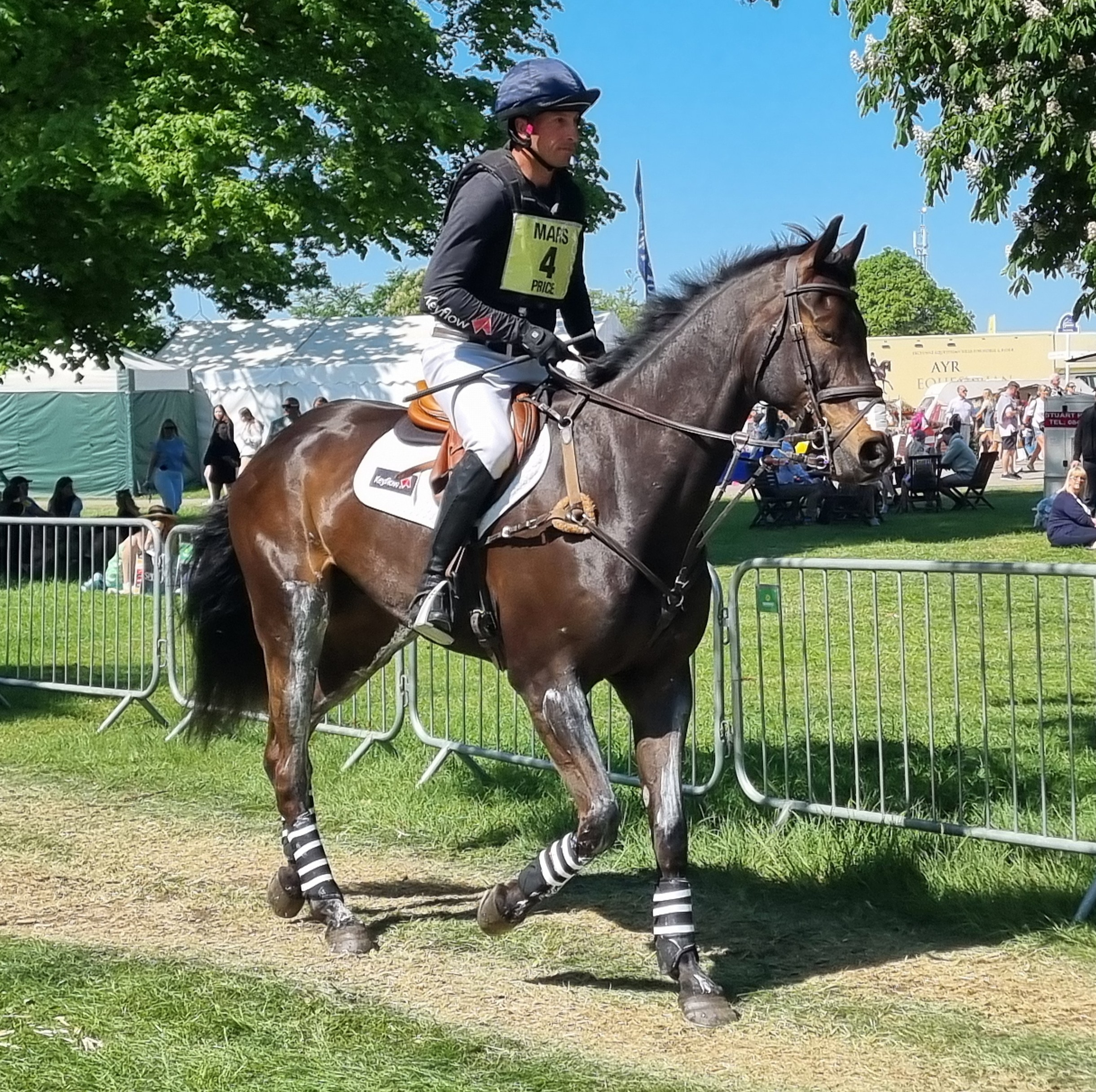
- Price at the Badminton Horse Trials 2025

Personal information
- Full name: Timothy Price
- Born: 3 April 1979 (age 47) Oxford, Canterbury, New Zealand
- Height: 189 cm (6 ft 2 in)
- Weight: 75 kg (165 lb)

Sport
- Country: New Zealand
- Sport: Equestrian
- Event: Eventing
Medal record
Equestrian
Representing New Zealand
World Championships
Bronze medal – third place	2022 Pratoni	Individual eventing
Bronze medal – third place	2022 Pratoni	Team eventing

Timothy Price (born 3 April 1979) is a New Zealand equestrian, competing in eventing. He is married to Jonelle Price (née Richards), also a New Zealand eventing rider. They are both competing at top international level.

Price was born in Oxford, Canterbury, New Zealand and educated at Rangiora High School. He travelled to the 2016 Summer Olympics in Rio de Janeiro as part of the reserve for individual and team eventing. Jock Paget withdrew on 5 August 2016 after his horse, Clifton Lush, cut its cheek at the Rio stable and did not recover in time for the event. Price and his horse Ringwood Sky Boy subsequently replaced Paget.

He competed at the 2016, 2020 and 2024 Summer Olympics in individual and team eventing.

== CCI5* results ==
Results
Event	Kentucky (USA) late April	Badminton (UK) early May	Luhmühlen (Germany) June	Burghley (UK) early September	Maryland (USA) early October	Pau (France) late October	Adelaide (Australia) early November
2002							9th (Desamoray)
2003				43rd (Desamoray)			
2004		48th (Desamoray)					
2005–2007	did not participate						
2008						20th (Vortex)	
2009		20th (Vortex)		RET (Vortex)		20th (Vortex)	
2010–2012	did not participate						
2013					Event first held in 2021	30th (Ringwood Sky Boy)	
2014		9th (Ringwood Sky Boy); EL (Wesko)	(gold) (Wesko)	EL (Ringwood Sky Boy)	Event first held in 2021		
2015	(silver) (Wesko)	15th (Ringwood Sky Boy)	15th (Bango)	(silver) (Ringwood Sky Boy)	Event first held in 2021	(bronze) (Wesko); 29th (Lord of the Owls)	
2016	EL (Bango)	EL (Ringwood Sky Boy)	4th (Ringwood Sky Boy)	4th (Ringwood Sky Boy); 21st (Bango)	Event first held in 2021	EL (Xavier Faer)	
2017	36th (Ringwood Sky Boy)	(bronze) (Xavier Faer)		5th (Ringwood Sky Boy); 18th (Xavier Faer)	Event first held in 2021		
2018		12th (Ringwood Sky Boy)		(gold) (Ringwood Sky Boy); 10th (Bango)	Event first held in 2021	EL (Ascona M)	
2019	(bronze) (Xavier Faer)	9th (Ringwood Sky Boy); RET (Bango)	(gold) (Ascona M)	5th (Bango); EL (Ringwood Sky Boy); RET (Xavier Faer)	Event first held in 2021	6th (Ascona M); EL (Wesko)	
2020	Cancelled due to COVID-19	Cancelled due to COVID-19	Cancelled due to COVID-19	Cancelled due to COVID-19	Event first held in 2021	(bronze) (Wesko)	Cancelled due to COVID-19
2021	(silver) (Xavier Faer)	Cancelled due to COVID-19		Cancelled due to COVID-19 ("replaced" by Bicton 5*: 9th (Ringwood Sky Boy)	(bronze) (Xavier Faer)	(gold) (Falco)	Cancelled due to COVID-19
2022		20th (Ringwood Sky Boy)		(bronze) (Vitali); 17th (Bango); RET (Polystar I)	(gold) (Coup de Cœur Dudevin)		
2023		7th (Vitali); WD (Coup de Cœur Dudevin)		4th (Vitali)		34th (Viscount Viktor); WD (Happy Boy)	
EL = Eliminated; RET = Retired; WD = Withdrew

== International championship results ==
Results
Year	Event	Place	Horse	Placing	Notes
2013	World Young Horse Championships	Le Lion d'Angers	Bango	12th	CCI2*
2014	World Equestrian Games	Caen	Wesko	14th	Team
2014	World Equestrian Games	Caen	Wesko	RET	Individual
2016	Olympic Games	Rio de Janeiro	Ringwood Sky Boy	4th	Team
2016	Olympic Games	Rio de Janeiro	Ringwood Sky Boy	EL	Individual
2016	World Young Horse Championships	Le Lion d'Angers	Kincooley Cruising	20th	CCI2*
2018	World Equestrian Games	Tryon	Cekatinka	7th	Team
2018	World Equestrian Games	Tryon	Cekatinka	8th	Individual
2019	World Young Horse Championships	Le Lion d'Angers	Happy Boy	1st place, gold medalist(s)	CCI3*
2020	Olympic Games	Tokyo	Vitali	5th	Team
2020	Olympic Games	Tokyo	Vitali	24th	Individual
2022	World Eventing Championships	Pratoni	Falco	3rd place, bronze medalist(s)	Team
2022	World Eventing Championships	Pratoni	Falco	3rd place, bronze medalist(s)	Individual
EL = Eliminated; RET = Retired; WD = Withdrew
