= Equestrian events at the 2012 Summer Olympics =

Equestrian at the Games of the XXX Olympiad
- Pictograms for Dressage (left), Eventing (center), and Jumping (right)
- Venue: Greenwich Park; 51.4803°N 0.0031°W
- Dates: 28 July – 9 August 2012
- Competitors: 199 from 40 nations

The equestrian events at the 2012 Olympic Games in London were held between 28 July and 9 August at Greenwich Park. Medals were awarded in three disciplines for both individual and team competitions.

Great Britain was the most successful nation, topping the medal table with three golds and five medals in total. They were particularly dominant in team events, taking two gold medals and a silver medal from three team events.

== Events ==
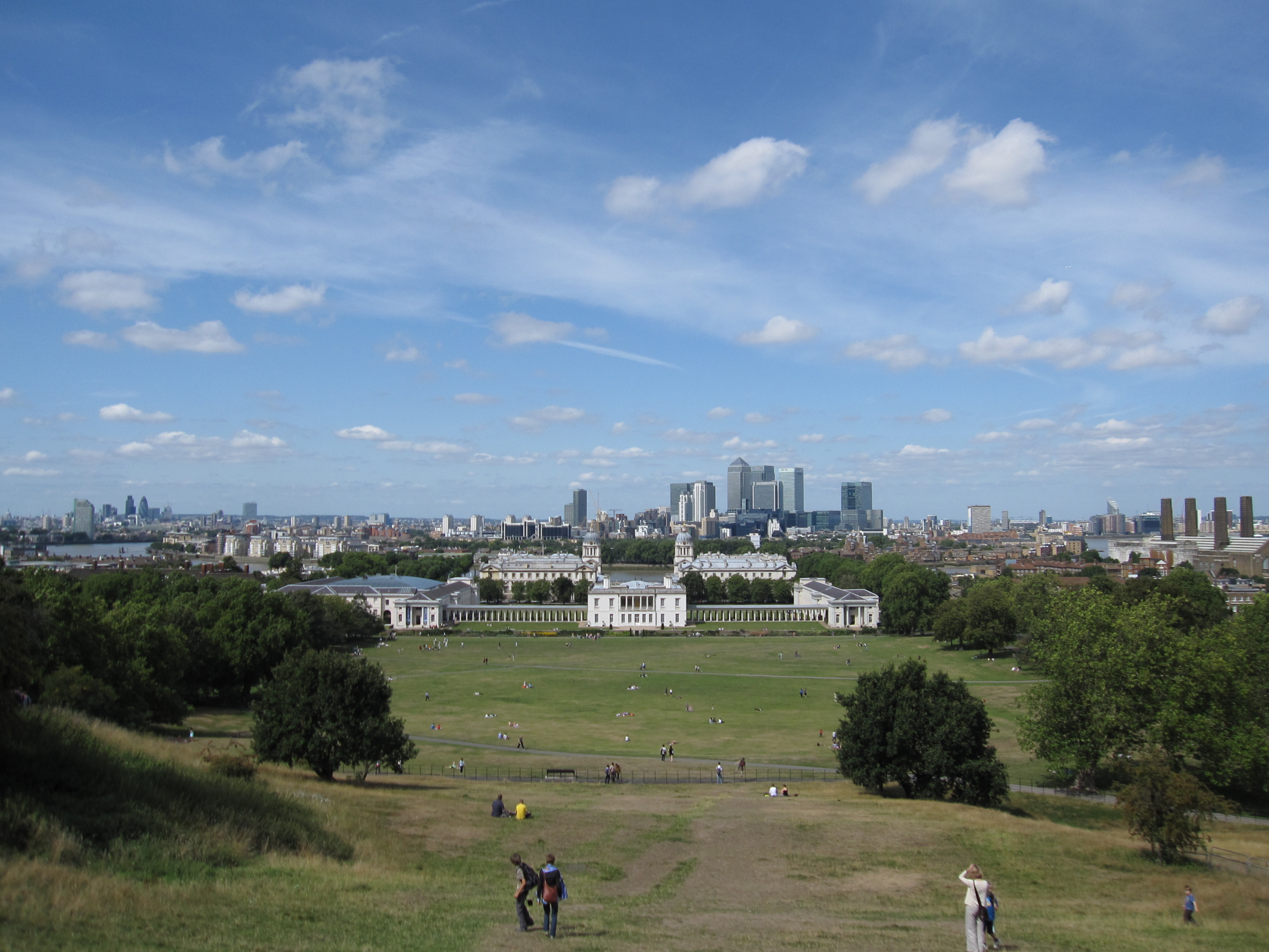
Greenwich Park hosted the equestrian events.

Medals were awarded in the following competitions:

- Individual dressage
- Team dressage
- Individual jumping
- Team jumping
- Individual eventing
- Team eventing

== Qualification ==
Each event has its own qualification rules, but generally rely on FEI rankings.

=== Dressage qualification ===
For the team competition there was a total of 11 quota berths available. Three team berths were awarded at the 2010 FEI World Equestrian Games. In addition 7 team berths were awarded at regional competitions (Europe: 3, America: 2, Asia: 2). In addition, should a country have qualified 3 athletes in the individual competition, they also qualify as a team and were allowed to compete in the team competition.

For the individual competition, 50 berths were allocated as follows: 33 to the athletes who qualified from the teams above. In addition, the highest ranked rider from each of seven geographic regions qualified. The top ten riders based on FEI ranking who did not qualify otherwise were given berths as well.

=== Jumping qualification ===
A country may send up to four riders if it qualified for the team competition. Similar to dressage, teams of four riders were qualified at either the World Equestrian Games (WEG) or through a regional competition. The WEG awarded five berths, the regions six (America: two, Europe: two, Asia: two), and the hosts (Great Britain). For the individual competition there was a total of 75 berths allocated as follows: 45 from the above teams the rest regional or through rankings.

=== Eventing qualification ===
A country may send up to five riders if it qualified for the team competition. Similar to dressage, teams of five riders were qualified at either the WEG, a regional competition, or through a composite spot. The WEG awarded five berths, the regions seven (America: three, Europe: three, Middle East & Africa: one), the hosts (Great Britain). For the individual competition there was a total of 75 berths allocated as follows: 55 from the above teams, 7 through regional competitions and 13 through the world rankings.

== Competition format ==
=== Show jumping ===
Five rounds are ridden to determine individual medals. Riders placing first through 60th (including ties for 60th place) advance to the second round. The top 45 riders of round 2, including ties for 45th, advance to the third round. The top 35 riders of the third round progress to the 4th round, but only up to three riders per team (so if a country has four riders in the top 35, one of those is not allowed to compete for individual medals).

In the fourth round (individual final round A), the slate is wiped clean and all riders begin with zero faults. The top 20 riders in round 4 advance to round 5 (individual final round B), and ride another course. The faults for individual final round A and B and added together to determine individual medals.

The team competition completes three rounds to determine medals. It runs concurrently with the individual competition (riders running over the same course) so team riders are also competing for individual medals. The first round for team competition is the round 2 course for individual medals. The top eight teams from the first team round advance to the second team round (which is the same course as the individual round 3). The scores for these eight countries over team rounds 1 and 2 are combined, and medals are awarded based on those scores.

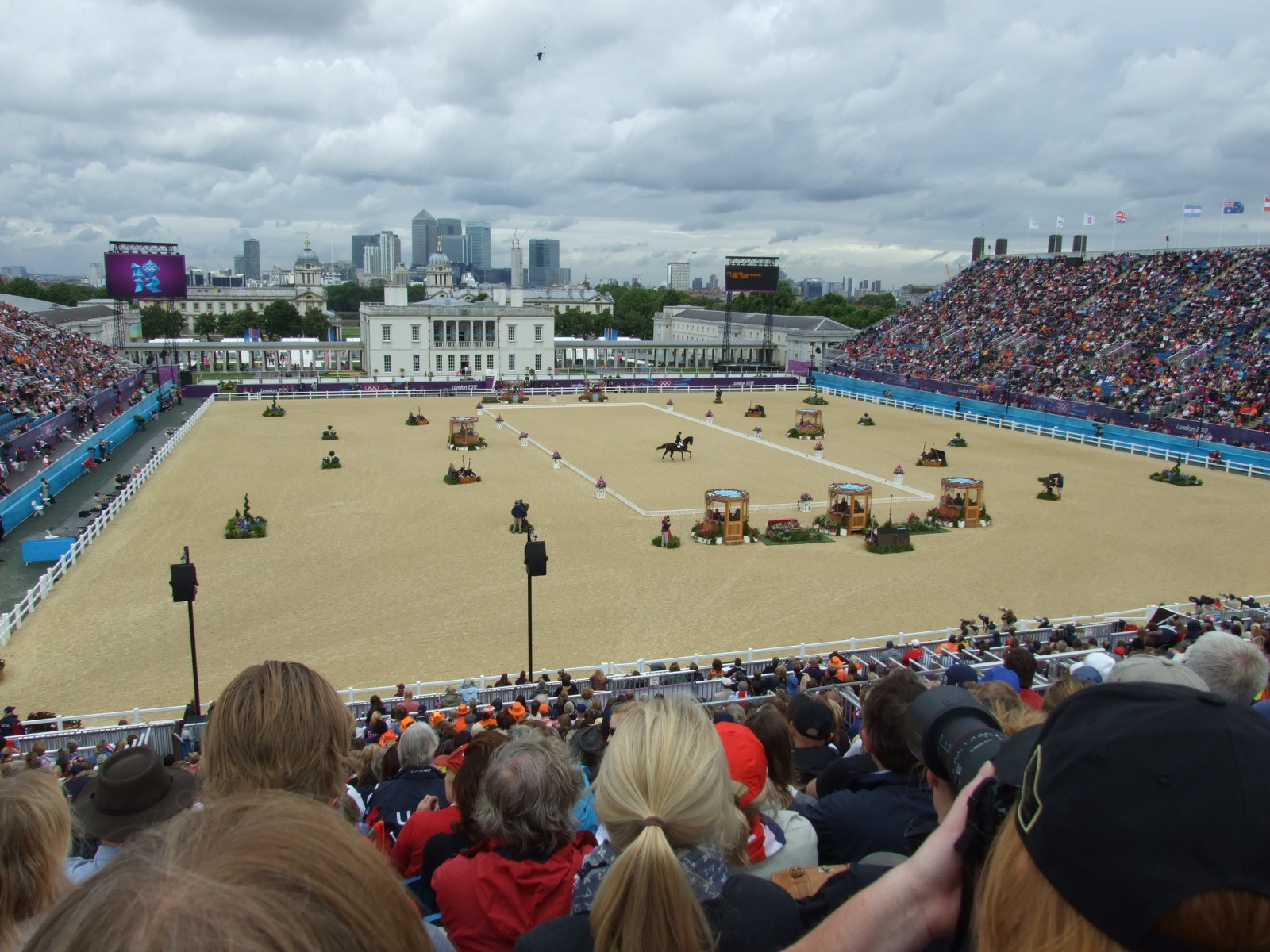
The dressage Grand Prix Special competition in the equestrian stadium at Greenwich Park.

=== Dressage ===
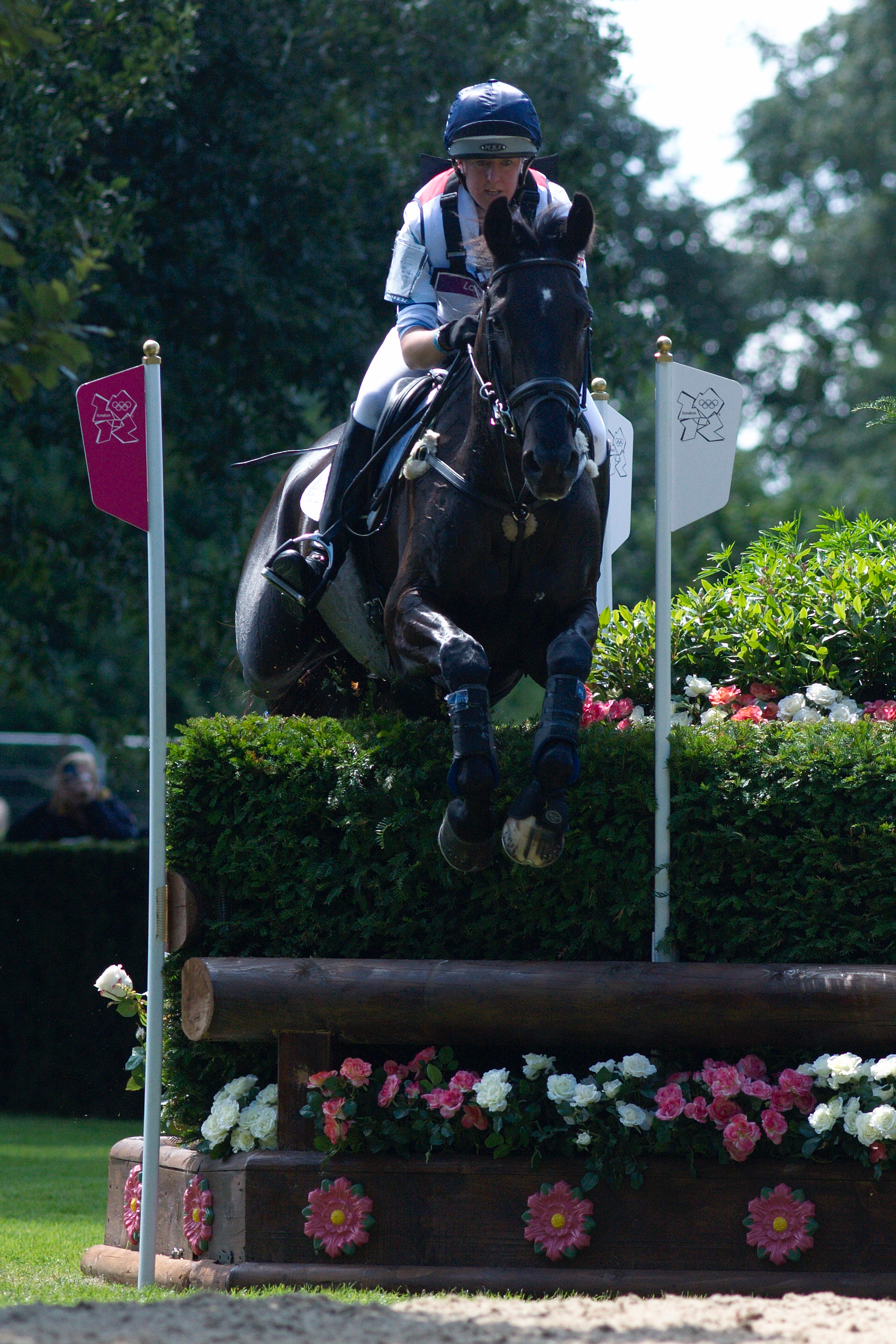
Nicola Wilson and Opposition Buzz competing in the cross-country discipline of the eventing

Teams are made up of three riders, all of whom are also competing concurrently for individual medals. Additionally, countries who can not make a full team may send riders to compete for individual medals.

All riders compete in the Grand Prix, which serves as the first round of both the individual and team medals. The top seven teams (included those tied for 7th) advance to the Grand Prix Special, which is a slightly more rigorous test. The combined scores for those teams in both the Grand Prix and the Special determine the team medals, with the team with the highest score winning gold.

Riders completing the Grand Prix test (first qualifying round of the individual competition) may move on to the Grand Prix Special (second qualifying round for the individual competition) if their team is in the top seven (21 riders total). Additionally, the top 11 riders who do not qualify with a team may also advance to the Special to ride for individual medals. The top 18 riders from the Special move on to the third individual round, the freestyle. Each rider designs their own test for the freestyle, which must be set to music and has several compulsory movements. Riders can tailor a test to their horses' strengths, as well as incorporate movements that are more difficult than those required in the Grand Prix or the Special (such as a pirouette in piaffe) in order to increase their scores. Individual medals are assigned based on scores in the freestyle.

=== Eventing ===
Competitions for team and individual medals ran concurrently. Riders performed a dressage test, a cross-country round, and a jumping round. Team medals were then awarded by adding together the best three scores from a country's team, out of a maximum of five team members, from all three phases, the team with the lowest number of penalty points winning the gold. The top 25 individual scores after the first show jumping round performed a second, final, show jumping round to determine individual medals, with up to 3 riders in the individual running per team. Therefore, those competing for individual berths completed one dressage test and cross-country round, and two jumping rounds.

== Medal summary ==
=== Medal table ===
Rank	Nation	Gold	Silver	Bronze	Total
1	Great Britain	3	1	1	5
2	Germany	2	1	1	4
3	Switzerland	1	0	0	1
4	Netherlands	0	3	1	4
5	Sweden	0	1	0	1
6	Ireland	0	0	1	1
6	New Zealand	0	0	1	1
6	Saudi Arabia	0	0	1	1
Totals (8 entries)		6	6	6	18

=== Medalists ===
Games	Gold	Silver	Bronze
Individual dressage	Charlotte Dujardin on Valegro; Great Britain	Adelinde Cornelissen on Parzival; Netherlands	Laura Bechtolsheimer on Mistral Hojris; Great Britain
Team dressage	Great Britain; Carl Hester on Uthopia; Laura Bechtolsheimer on Mistral Hojris; Charlotte Dujardin on Valegro	Germany; Dorothee Schneider on Diva Royal; Kristina Sprehe on Desperados; Helen Langehanenberg on Damon Hill	Netherlands; Anky van Grunsven on Salinero; Edward Gal on Undercover; Adelinde Cornelissen on Parzival
Individual eventing	Michael Jung on Sam; Germany	Sara Algotsson Ostholt on Wega; Sweden	Sandra Auffarth on Opgun Louvo; Germany
Team eventing	Germany; Peter Thomsen on Barny; Dirk Schrade on King Artus; Ingrid Klimke on Butts Abraxxas; Sandra Auffarth on Opgun Louvo; Michael Jung on Sam	Great Britain; Nicola Wilson on Opposition Buzz; Mary King on Imperial Cavalier; Zara Phillips on High Kingdom; Kristina Cook on Miners Frolic; William Fox-Pitt on Lionheart	New Zealand; Jonelle Richards on Flintstar; Jonathan Paget on Clifton Promise; Caroline Powell on Lenamore; Andrew Nicholson on Nereo; Mark Todd on Campino
Individual jumping	Steve Guerdat on Nino Des Buissonets; Switzerland	Gerco Schröder on London; Netherlands	Cian O'Connor on Blue Loyd 12; Ireland
Team jumping	Great Britain; Scott Brash on Hello Sanctos; Peter Charles on Vindicat; Ben Maher on Tripple X Nick Skelton on Big Star	Netherlands; Marc Houtzager on Tamino; Gerco Schröder on London; Maikel van der Vleuten on Verdi; Jur Vrieling on Bubalu	Saudi Arabia; Ramzy Al Duhami on Bayard Van the Villa There; Abdullah bin Mutaib Al Saud on Davos; Kamal Bahamdan on Noblesse Des Tess; Abdullah Waleed Sharbatly on Sultan

=== Gallery ===
Gallery of some of the gold medalists in the equestrian events:

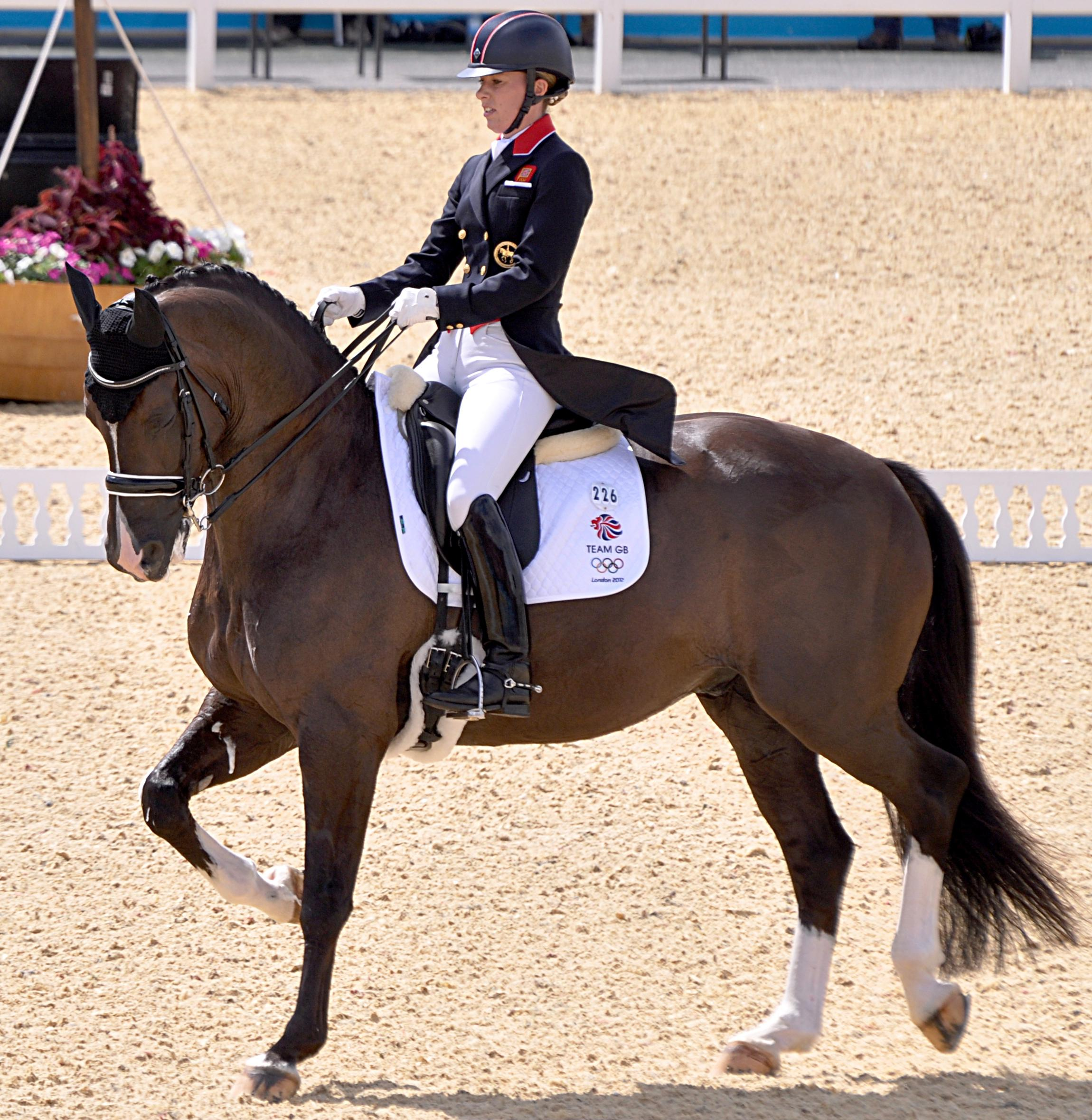
Great Britain's Charlotte Dujardin on Valegro, winners of the individual dressage and part of the team dressage

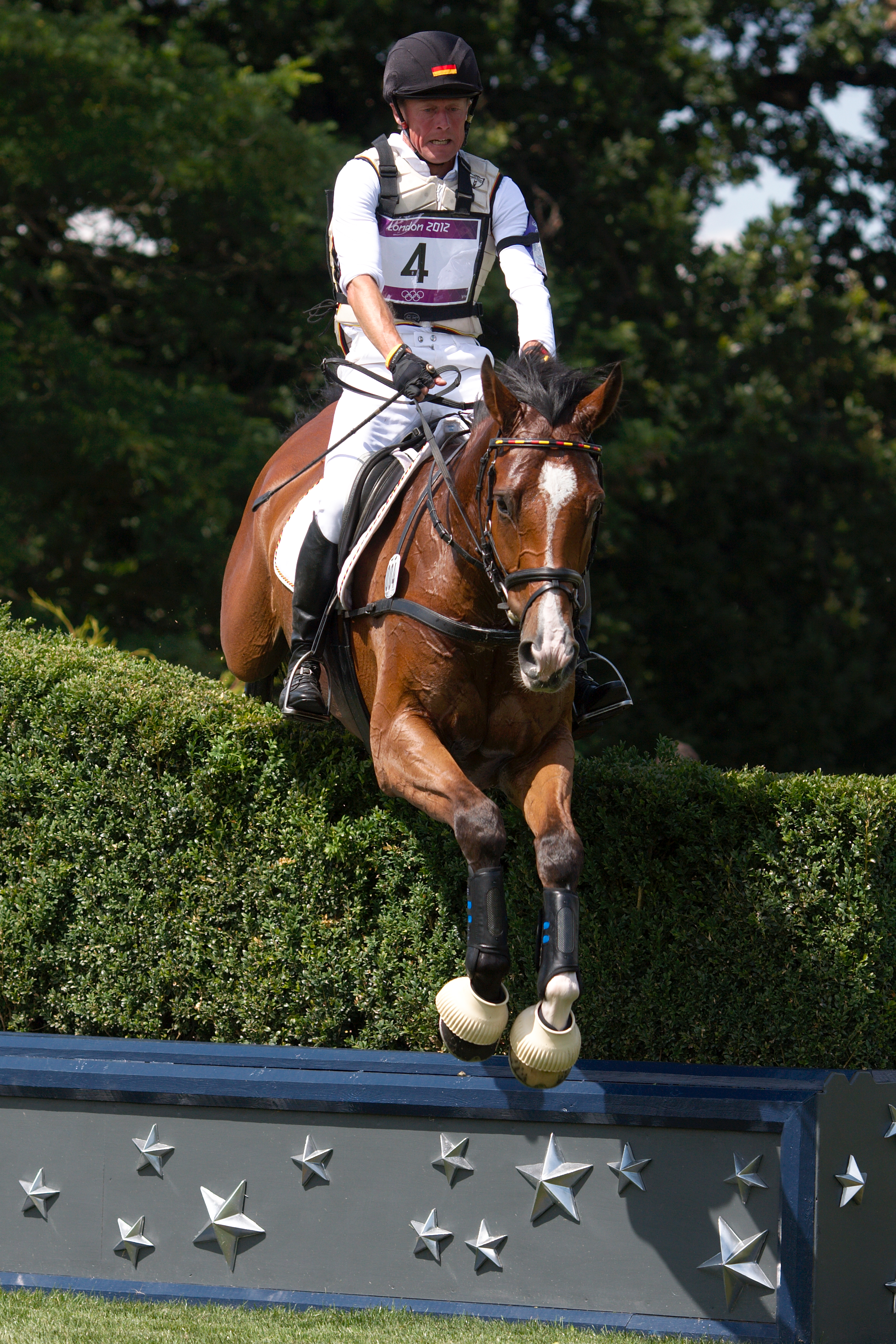
Peter Thomsen rides Barny for Germany in the team eventing

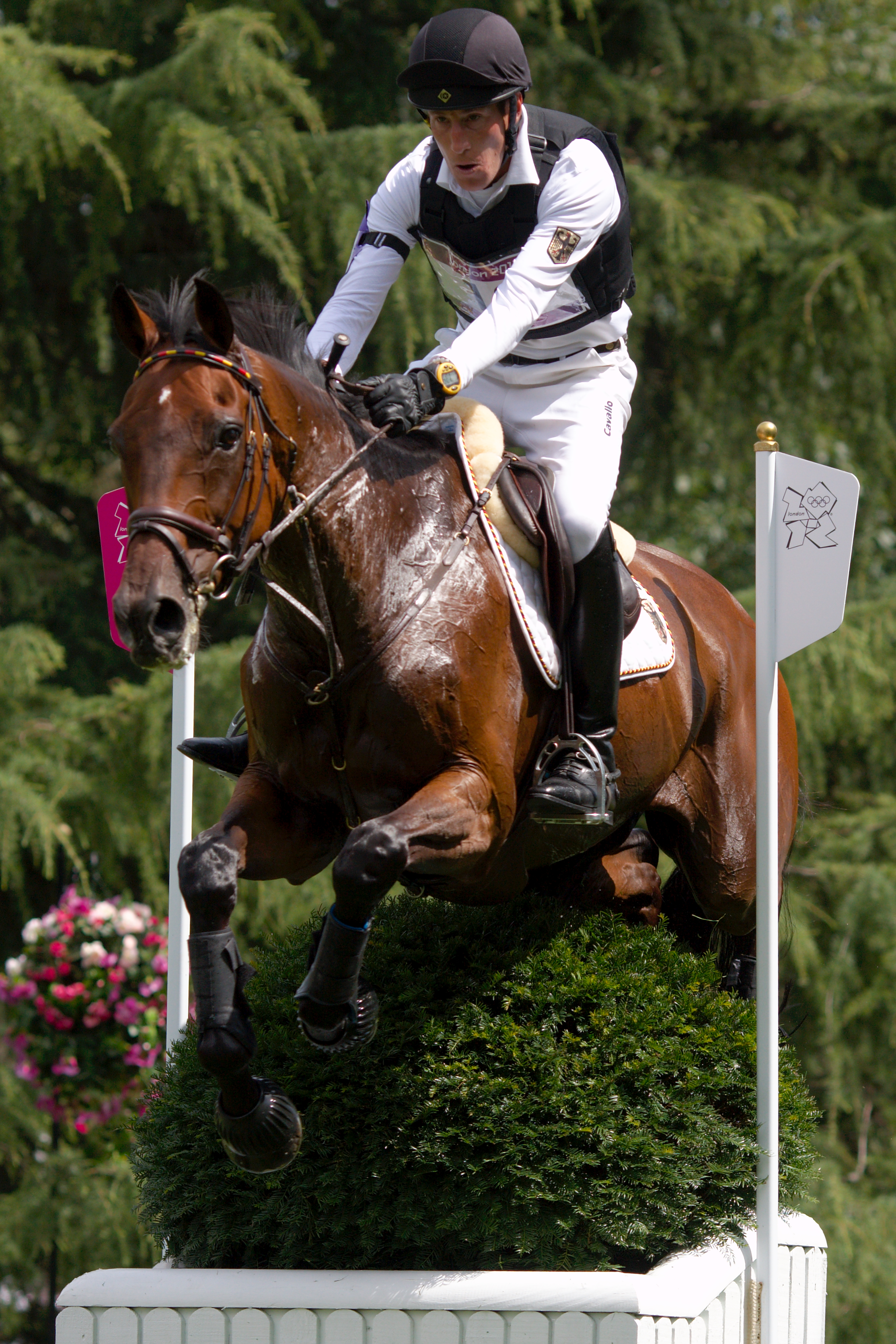
Dirk Schrade riding King Artus in the team eventing

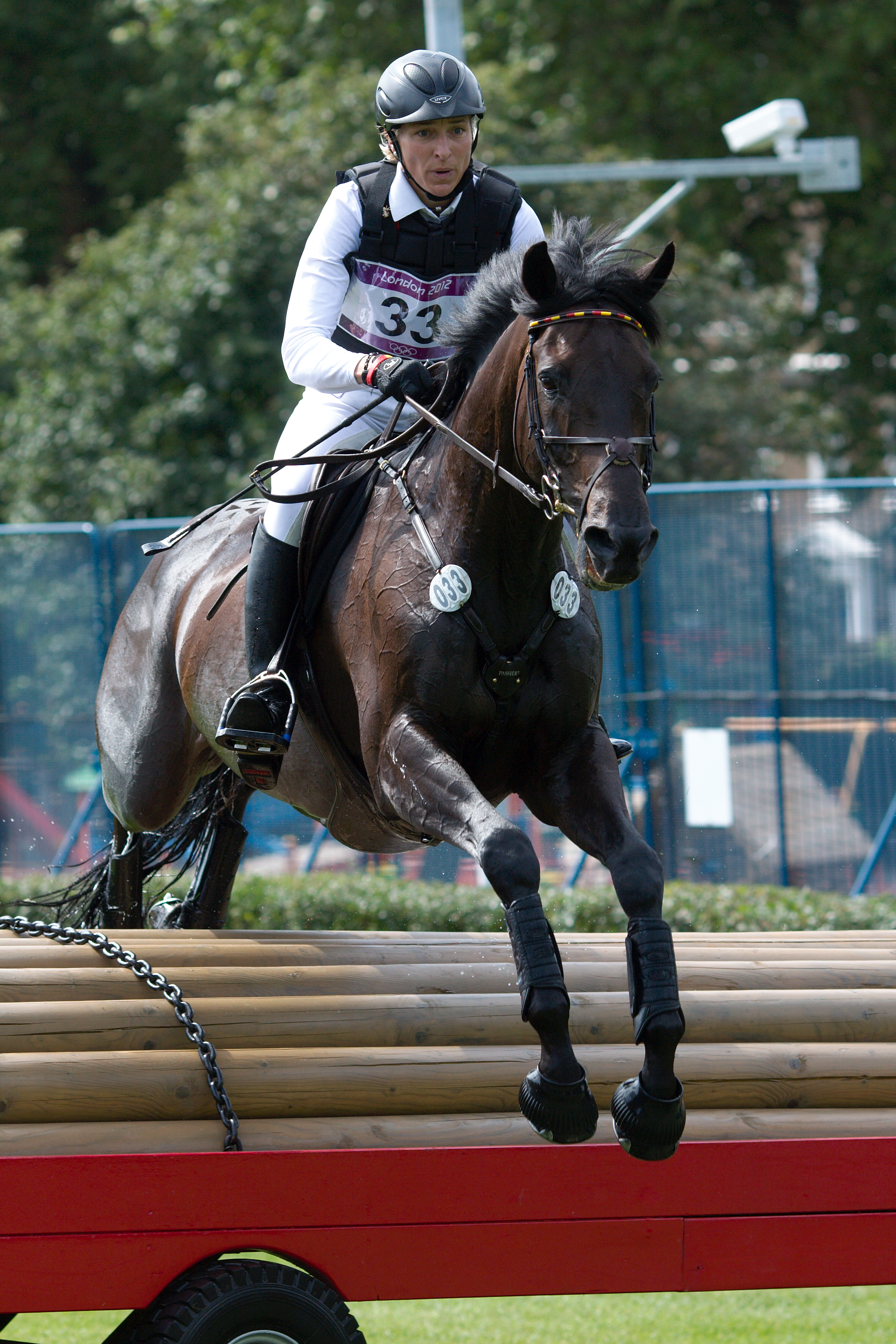
Ingrid Klimke on Butts Abraxxas in the team eventing

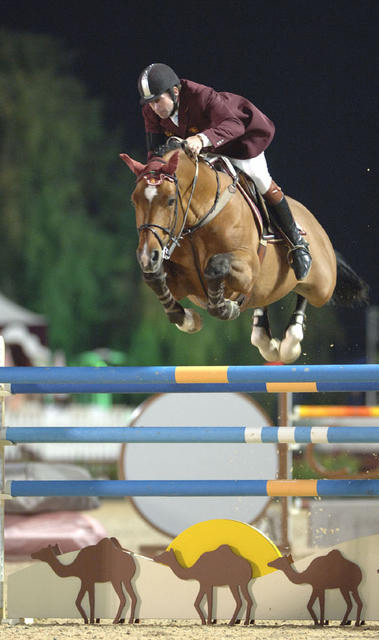
Nick Skelton, pictured in 2006, was part of the British team that won the team jumping

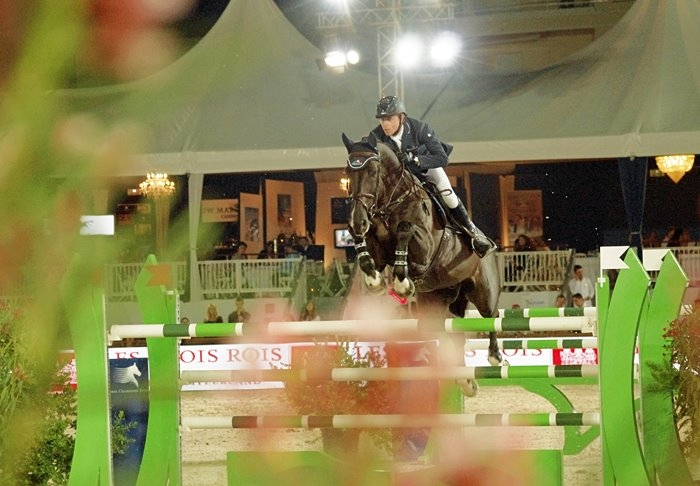
Ben Maher on Tripple X, pictured in June 2012, was part of the British team that won the team jumping
