= Aurélien Kahn =

French equestrian

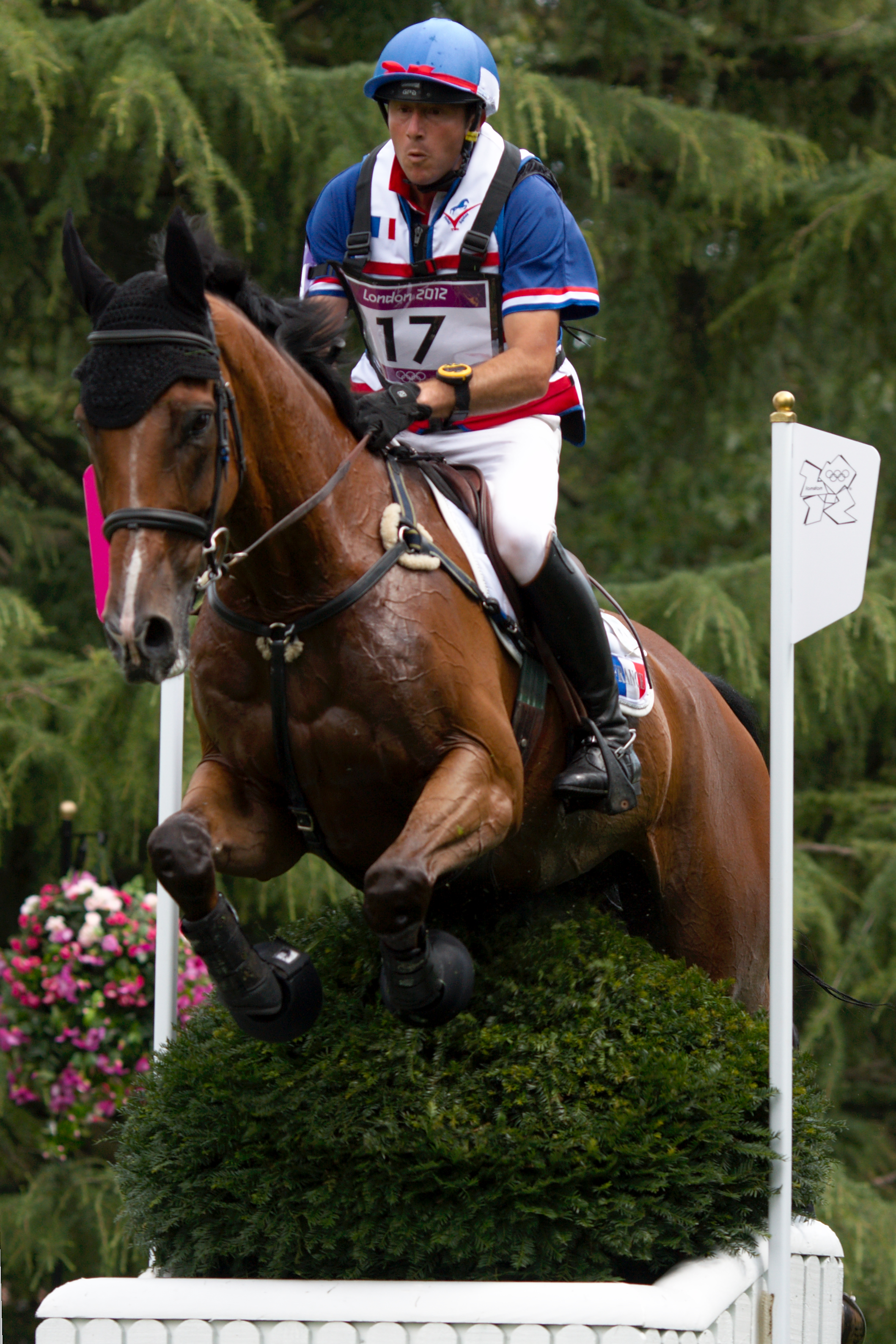
Aurélien Kahn and Cadiz competing at the 2012 Summer Olympics in London.

Aurélien Kahn (born 30 December 1968) is a French equestrian. At the 2012 Summer Olympics he competed in the individual and team eventing.
