= Jonelle Price =

New Zealand equestrian

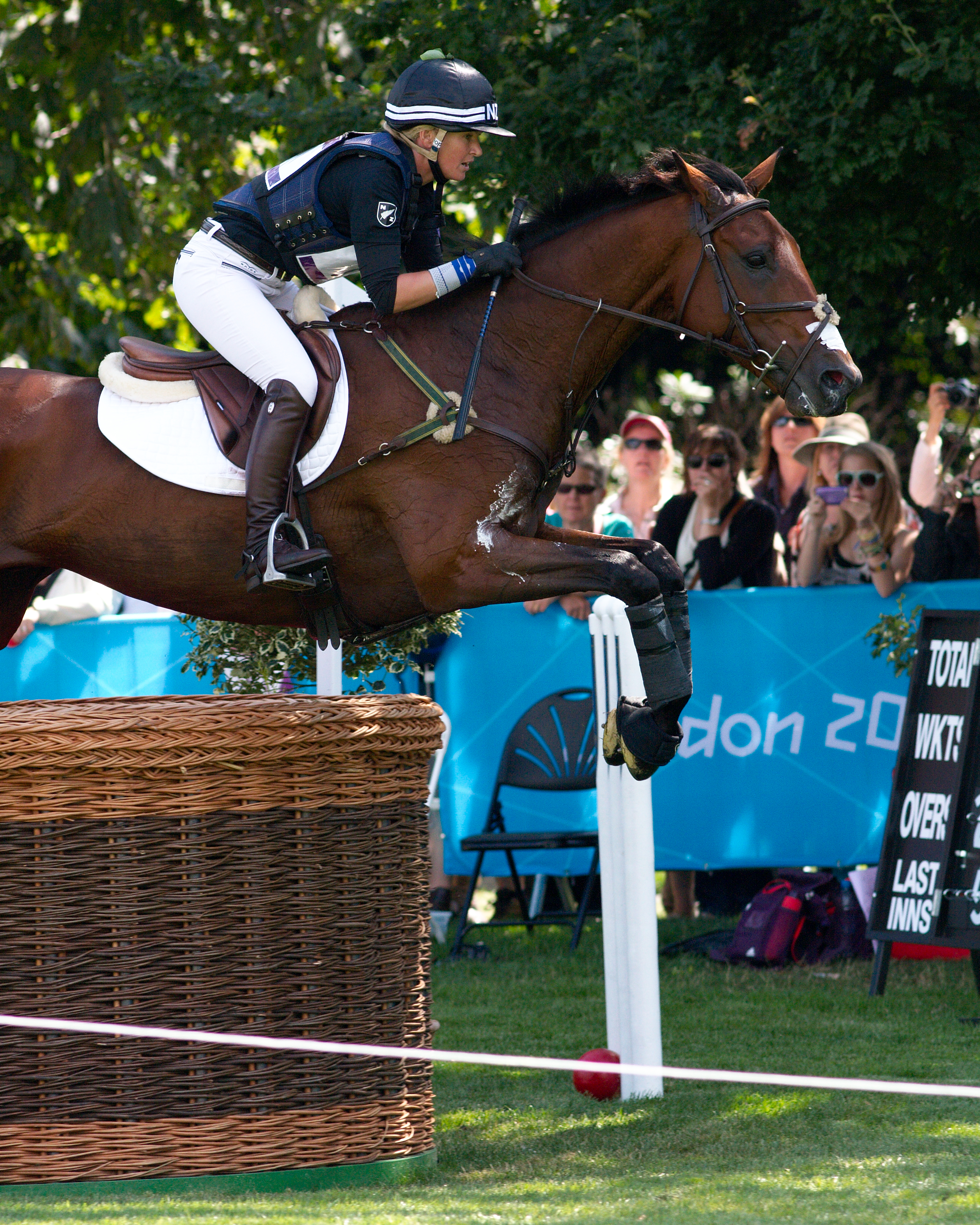
- Richards and Flintstar competing at the 2012 Olympics.

Medal record

Equestrian

Representing New Zealand

Olympic Games
Bronze medal – third place	2012 London	Team eventing

World Championships
Bronze medal – third place	2022 Pratoni	Team eventing

Jonelle Price (née Richards; born 14 October 1980) is a New Zealand equestrian, competing in eventing. She is married to Tim Price, also a New Zealand eventing rider. They are both competing at top international level.

At the 2012 Summer Olympics she won the bronze medal in Team eventing. In 2018, she won the Badminton Horse Trials in England. and also won the Luhmuhlen Horse Trials on Maggie in 2018.

Price also runs a farm business with husband, Tim Price. Jonelle won Badminton in 2018, after many unsuccessful attempts, on the black mare, Classic Moet. Jonelle had taken a year out to have a baby, but a week after having her child, got back to riding. Tim Price, her husband, also got placed at 2018's Badminton Horse Trials, on their gelding, Ringwood Sky Boy. When asked to describe each other, Jonelle said that Tim was a more talented rider and Tim said that she was more competitive. Classic Moet was predicted to have one of the fastest cross country rounds as she is known to be an incredibly speedy little horse, she certainly proved this at Badminton.

== CCI***** results ==
Results
Event	Kentucky (USA) late April	Badminton (UK) early May	Luhmühlen (Germany) June	Burghley (UK) early September	Maryland (USA) early October	Pau (France) late October	Adelaide (Australia) early November
2004		17th (Mazetto)					
2005		WD (Mazetto)	29th (Mazetto)				
2006–2010	did not participate						
2011				27th (Flintstar)			
2012	did not participate						
2013	18th (The Deputy)		8th (Flintstar)	5th (The Deputy); 20th (Flintstar)	Event first held in 2021		
2014		RET (The Deputy)	12th (Classic Moet); 16th (The Deputy)	9th (The Deputy)	Event first held in 2021	4th (Faerie Dianimo)	
2015		20th (Classic Moet); 35th (The Deputy)	(silver) (Faerie Dianimo)	5th (Classic Moet)	Event first held in 2021	WD (Faerie Dianimo)	
2016		10th (Classic Moet)		(bronze) (Classic Moet)	Event first held in 2021		
2017					Event first held in 2021	10th (Faerie Dianimo)	
2018		(gold) (Classic Moet)	(gold) (Faerie Dianimo)		Event first held in 2021		
2019				RET (Faerie Dianimo)	Event first held in 2021		
2020	Cancelled due to COVID-19	Cancelled due to COVID-19	Cancelled due to COVID-19	Cancelled due to COVID-19	Event first held in 2021	12th (Grovine de Reve); WD (Faerie Dianimo)	Cancelled due to COVID-19
2021	(bronze) (Grovine de Reve); 7th (Classic Moet); 28th (Grappa Nera)	Cancelled due to COVID-19	EL (Faerie Dianimo)	Cancelled due to COVID-19 ("replaced" by Bicton 5*)	8th (Classic Moet)	(bronze) (McClaren)	Cancelled due to COVID-19
2022	18th (McClaren)	11th (Classic Moet)		4th (Classic Moet)		(gold) (Grappa Nera)	
2023						7th (Hiarado); EL (McClaren)	
EL = Eliminated; RET = Retired; WD = Withdrew

== International championship results ==
Results
Year	Event	Place	Horse	Placing	Notes
2011	World Young Horse Championships	Le Lion d'Angers	Aloha	12th	CCI1*
2011	World Young Horse Championships	Le Lion d'Angers	Faerie Dianimo	16th	CCI1*
2012	Olympic Games	London	Flintstar	3rd place, bronze medalist(s)	Team
2012	Olympic Games	London	Flintstar	32nd	Individual
2013	World Young Horse Championships	Le Lion d'Angers	Cloud Dancer	5th	CCI1*
2014	World Equestrian Games	Caen	Classic Moet	14th	Team
2014	World Equestrian Games	Caen	Classic Moet	4th	Individual
2014	World Young Horse Championships	Le Lion d'Angers	Cloud Dancer	7th	CCI2*
2016	Olympic Games	Rio de Janeiro	Faerie Dianimo	4th	Team
2016	Olympic Games	Rio de Janeiro	Faerie Dianimo	17th	Individual
2016	World Young Horse Championships	Le Lion d'Angers	Cooley Showtime	3rd place, bronze medalist(s)	CCI2*
2016	World Young Horse Championships	Le Lion d'Angers	Obos Impressive	39th	CCI2*
2018	World Equestrian Games	Tryon	Classic Moet	7th	Team
2018	World Equestrian Games	Tryon	Classic Moet	19th	Individual
2020	Olympic Games	Tokyo	Grovine de Reve	5th	Team
2020	Olympic Games	Tokyo	Grovine de Reve	11th	Individual
2022	World Eventing Championships	Pratoni	McClaren	3rd place, bronze medalist(s)	Team
2022	World Eventing Championships	Pratoni	McClaren	10th	Individual
2022	World Young Horse Championships	Le Lion d'Angers	Fernhill Kankan	49th	CCI3*-L
EL = Eliminated; RET = Retired; WD = Withdrew

== Notable horses ==
- Flintstar – 2000 Bay Thoroughbred Gelding (Zabalu x Kingcroft Wicklow)
  - 2012 London Olympics – Team Bronze Medal, Individual 32nd Place
- Classic Moet – 2002 Black Mare (Classic x Bohemond)
  - 2014 Caen World Equestrian Games – Individual 4th Place
  - 2015 Burghley Horse Trials - Individual 5th Place
  - 2016 Badminton Horse Trials – Individual 10th
  - 2016 Burghley Horse Trials - Individual 3rd Place
  - 2018 Badminton Horse Trials – Winner
  - 2018 Tryon World Equestrian Games, Team 7th, Individual 19th
  - 2021 Kentucky Horse Trials - Individual 7th
  - 2022 Badminton Horse Trials – Individual 11th
  - 2022 Burghley Horse Trials - Individual 4th Place
- OBOS Impressive – 2009 Bay Irish Sport Horse Mare (OBOS Quality x Lanceston)
  - 2016 FEI Eventing Young Horse World Championships – 39th Place
- Cooley Showtime – 2009 Bay Dutch Warmblood Gelding (Chin Chin x Julio Mariner XX)
  - 2016 FEI Eventing Young Horse World Championships – Bronze Medal
- Faerie Dianimo – 2005 Gray British Sport Horse Mare (DiMaggio x Catherston Dazzler)
  - 2014 Pau Horse Trials - Individual 4th Place
  - 2015 Luhmuhlen Horse Trials - Individual 2nd Place
  - 2016 Rio Olympics – Team 4th Place, Individual 17th Place
  - 2017 Pau Horse Trials - Individual 10th Place
  - 2018 Luhmuhlen Horse Trials – Winner
- McClaren - 2007 Bay Holsteiner gelding (Clarimo Ask x Toni 1)
  - 2021 Pau Horse Trials - Individual 3rd Place
  - 2022 Pratoni World Eventing Championships - Team Bronze medal, individual 10th Place
