= Peter Barry (equestrian) =

Canadian equestrian

Personal information
- Born: June 17, 1956 (age 70)

Peter Barry (born 17 June 1956 in Cologne, Germany) is a Canadian Equestrian Team athlete. He competed at the 2012 Summer Olympics where he was eliminated in the individual and finished 13th in the team eventing competitions.

Barry also represented Canada at the 2014 World Equestrian Games in Normandy, France, where he achieved 6th position in team and 42nd position in individual eventing.
