= Andrew Heffernan =

Dutch equestrian

Medal record

Equestrian

Representing the Netherlands

World Equestrian Games
Bronze medal – third place	2014 Normandy	Team eventing

Andrew Heffernan (born 18 June 1975 in Hong Kong) is a Dutch equestrian, living in Nantwich, Cheshire. At the 2012 Summer Olympics he competed in the Individual eventing and team eventing.
