= William Coleman (equestrian) =

American equestrian

Personal information
- Born: May 8, 1983 (age 43) Locust Valley, New York

Sport
- Country: United States
Medal record
Equestrian
Representing the United States
World Championships
Silver medal – second place	2022 Pratoni	Team eventing
Bronze medal – third place	2026 Aachen	Team eventing

William Coleman III (born May 8, 1983) is an American equestrian. At the 2012 Summer Olympics he competed in the Individual eventing and Team eventing. At the age of six, Coleman's family moved to Charlottesville, VA where he started riding in the hunt fields of Virginia Piedmont Hunt. His father was an avid fox hunter and became his first show jumping coach. After Coleman began to focus on eventing he started training with Karen and David O’Connor, beginning an apprentice with the pair after his graduation from Woodberry Forest School.

In 2001 at the age of 18, Coleman was gold medalist at the North American Young Rider's Championship. When he turned 19 he began competing at three-star level. That year he finished 8th on Second Hope at Fair Hill International CCI3*, earning a spot on the USEF's winter training list. In 2003, Coleman and Fox In Flight won the under-25 Championships at the Bramham CCI3*, becoming the only US combination to ever do so. The pair competed in their first CCI4* at Burghley, jumping a clean cross country round and finishing 26th overall.

At the age of 20, Coleman was listed as a contender for a spot on the US Olympic team in Athens. His Olympic prospect Fox In Flight was injured prior to qualifying, putting him out of contention for the 2004 Olympics. In 2004 he rode Second Hope at Rolex Kentucky, where he finished as the top placed young rider.

In 2005 Coleman began college at University of Virginia, leading to the sale of some of his top horses, as he took a step back from completing to focus on his education. Away from competition, he continued to focus on his riding education, taking lessons from top riders such as Gerd Reuter, Anne Kursinski and Wiljan Laraakers.

In 2012 Will placed fourth on Twizzel at Rolex Kentucky CCI4* and earned a spot on the team US London Olympic team.

In 2021, Coleman won the CHIO Aachen Nations Cup aboard Off the Record. He became the first American event rider to win in Aachen.

== Results ==
- 2001 NAYRC 1st – Ratzi
- 2002 Fair Hill CCI3* 8th — Second Hope
- 2003 Burghley International CCI4* 26th – Fox in Flight
- 2003 Chatsworth CIC3* – Fox-in-Flight
- 2003 Chatsworth Advanced 1st – Second Hope
- 2003 Bramham International U-25 CCI3* UK 1st – Fox In Flight
- 2004 Rolex Kentucky CCI4* 19th -Second Hope
- 2004 USEF Olympic Games Short List – Fox In Flight
- 2004 USEA Young Rider and Advanced Rider of the Year
- 2005 Luhmuhlen CCI4* Germany 16th – Second Hope, Second Highest Placed American
- 2006 USEF National CCI Championship – Kiki du Manoir
- 2007 Adequan Gold Cup Series 1st – Kiki du Manoir
- 2008 American Eventing Championship Intermediate 4th – Nevada Bay
- 2008 American Eventing Championship Advanced 3rd – Twizzel
- 2008 The Fork Horse Trials CIC3* 7th – Twizzel
- 2008 Planation Field CIC3* 1st – Twizzel
- 2008 Fair Hill International CCI3* 3rd – Twizzel
- 2009 USEF High Performance A List – Twizzel
- 2009 Luhmuhlen CCI4* Germany 5th – Twizzel
- 2010 USEF High Performance A-List on Twizzel
- 2010 Red Hills CIC3* World Cup Qualifier 3rd – Nevada Bay
- 2011 USEF Pan American Games Short List – OBOS O’Reilly
- 2011 Barbury International CIC3* 7th – Twizzel
- 2011 Fair Hill CCI3* 4th – Twizzel
- 2011 USEF High Performance B-List – Twizzel
- 2012 USEF Olympic Games Short List
- 2012 Olympic Games 37th – Twizzel
- 2013 Fair Hill International CIC3* 1st – OBOS O’Reilly
- 2013 Bromont CCI3* 1st – OBOS O’Reilly
- 2013 USEF WORLD CLASS LIST – OBOS O’Reilly
- 2013 Fair Hill CCI3* 3rd – Conair
- 2014 USEF NATIONAL LIST – Conair and OBOS O’Reilly
- 2015 Rolex Kentucky CCI4* 6th Place Overall and USEF National Reserve Champion, Best Turned Out, Best Conditioned, and Land Rover Best Ride of the Day – OBOS O’Reilly
- 2015 Blenheim CCI3* 11th – OBOS O’Reilly

== CCI***** results ==
Results
Event	Kentucky	Badminton	Luhmühlen	Burghley	Pau	Adelaide
2003				26th (Fox In Flight)		
2004	19th (A Second Hope NRW)					
2005			16th (A Second Hope NRW)			
2006-2008	Did not participate					
2009			5th (Twizzel)			
2010	Did not participate					
2011	EL (Twizzel)			WD (Twizzel)		
2012	5th (Twizzel)					
2013-2014	Did not participate					
2015	6th (OBOS O'Reilly)					
2016	Did not participate					
2017	34th (Tight Lines)RET (OBOS O'Reilly)		12th (OBOS O'Reilly)			
2018	12th (Tight Lines)	RET (OBOS O'Reilly)				
2019	13th (Tight Lines)			25th (Tight Lines)		
EL = Eliminated; RET = Retired; WD = Withdrew

== International championship results ==
Results
Year	Event	Horse	Placing	Notes
2012	Olympic Games	Twizzel	7th	Team
2012	Olympic Games	Twizzel	37th	Individual
2018	World Equestrian Games	Tight Lines	8th	Team
2018	World Equestrian Games	Tight Lines	66th	Individual
EL = Eliminated; RET = Retired; WD = Withdrew
