= Camilla Speirs =

Irish equestrian and Olympian

Camilla Speirs (born 23 August 1989 in Dublin) is an Irish equestrian. At the 2012 Summer Olympics she competed in individual eventing and team eventing. She took up riding at 5, and starting to pursue eventing at the age of 8. She made her international debut in 2010.
