= Michael Ryan (equestrian) =

Irish equestrian

Joseph Murphy
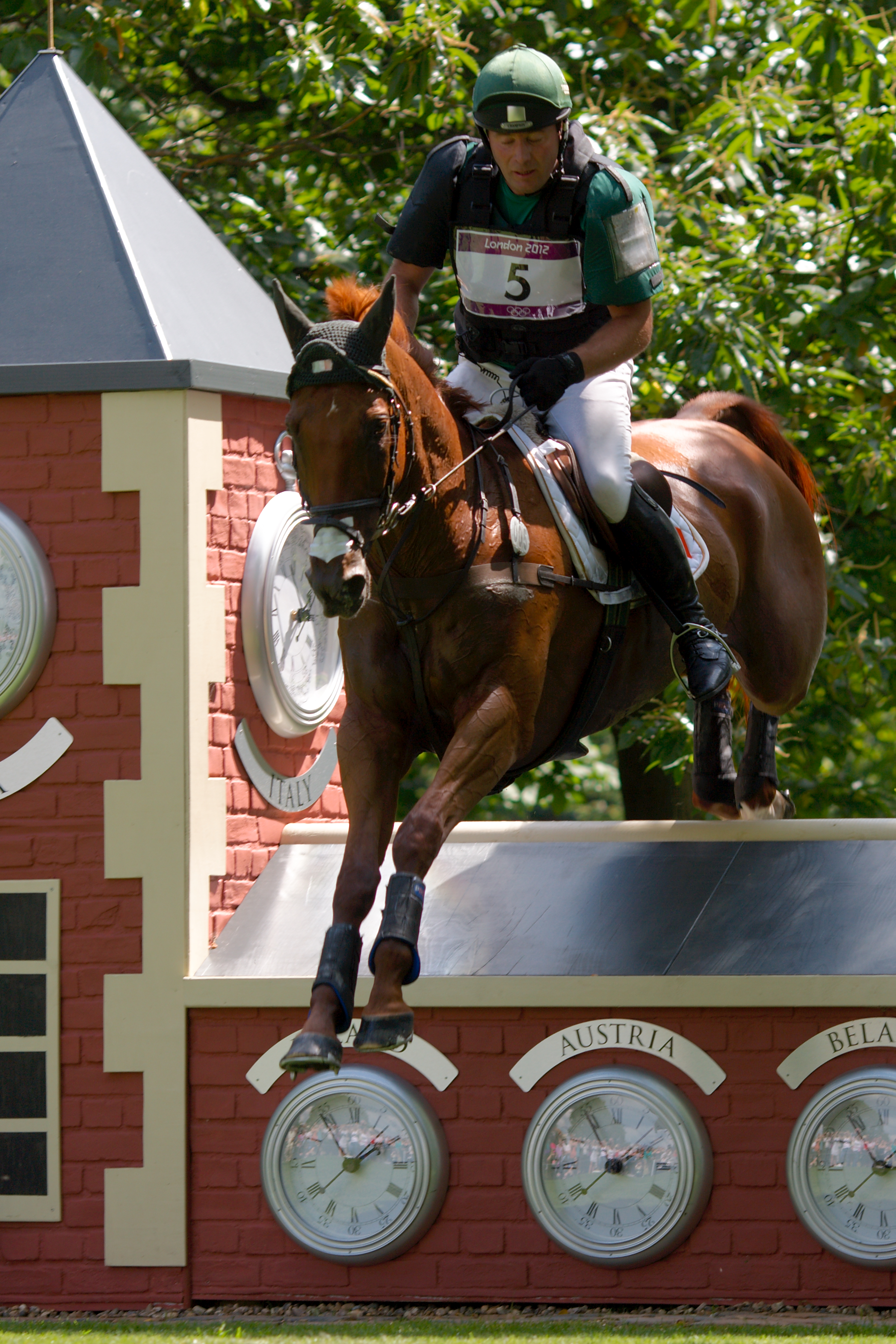
- Michael Ryan and Ballylynch Adventure competing at the 2012 Olympics

Personal information
- Born: April 3, 1976 (age 50) Limerick, Ireland

Michael Ryan (born 3 April 1976 in Limerick, Ireland) is an Irish equestrian. He competed at the 2012 Summer Olympics where he was eliminated in the individual and finished 5th in the team eventing competition.

Ryan also took part at the 2006 World Equestrian Games and at four editions of European Eventing Championships (in 2003, 2005, 2009 and 2015). Ryan's best individual championship result came at the 2015 European Championships, when he finished in the 14th position.

He is married to the fellow eventing rider Patricia Ryan.
