= Caroline Powell (equestrian) =

New Zealand equestrian

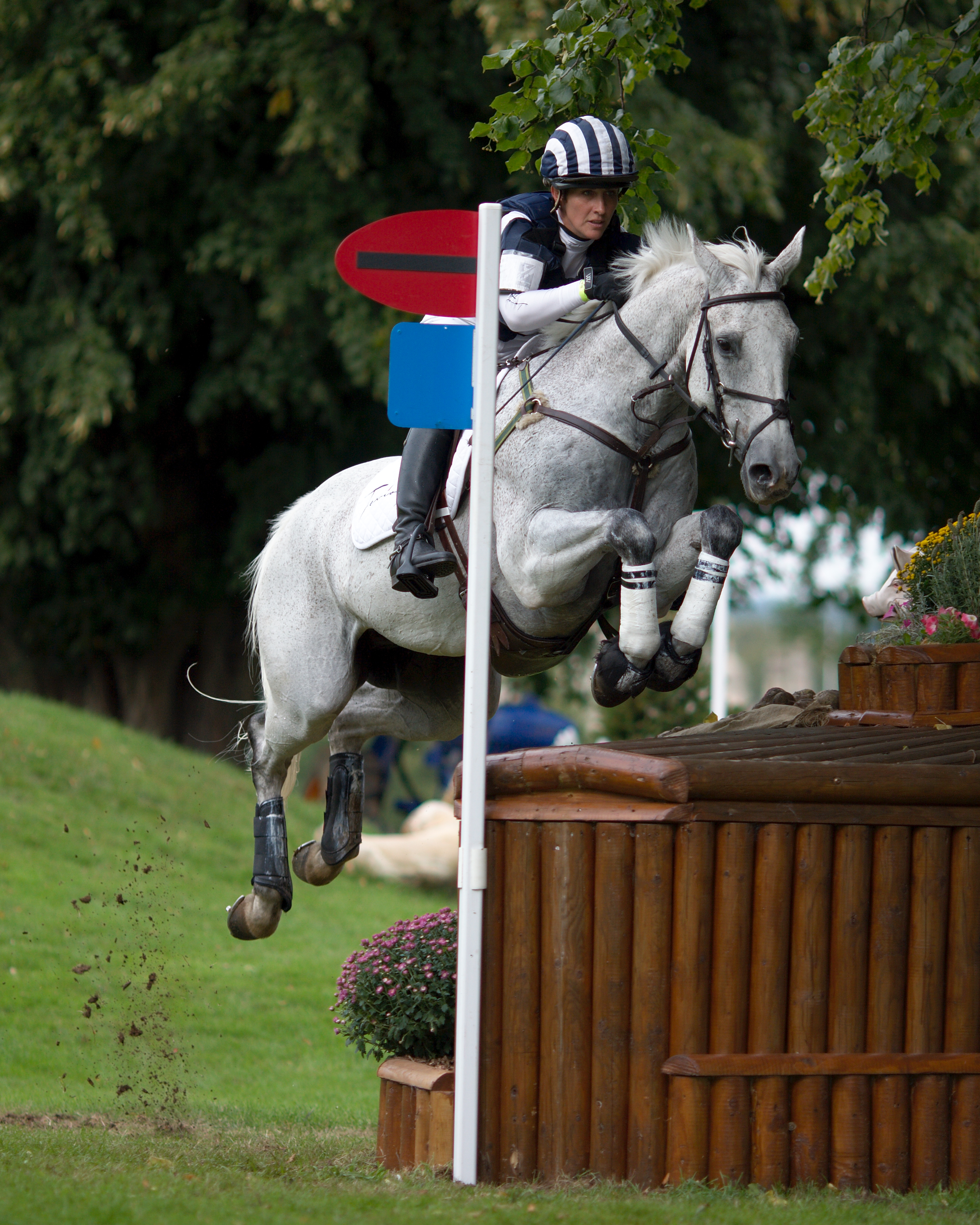

Personal information
- Nationality: New Zealand
- Born: 14 March 1973 (age 53) Lower Hutt, New Zealand
- Height: 156 cm (5 ft 1 in)
- Weight: 60 kg (132 lb)

Sport
- Country: New Zealand
- Sport: Equestrian

Achievements and titles
- Olympic finals: 2008, 2012
- World finals: 2006, 2010
Medal record
Equestrian
Representing New Zealand
Olympic Games
Bronze medal – third place	2012 London	Team eventing
World Championships
Bronze medal – third place	2010 Kentucky	Team eventing

Caroline Powell (born 14 March 1973) is a New Zealand equestrian. At the 2012 Summer Olympics she won the bronze medal in team eventing. She was born in Lower Hutt, New Zealand and lives in Suffolk, East Anglia.

Powell has represented New Zealand in two Olympic Games and two World Games, where she won a bronze team medal in 2010. Also in 2010, she won the Burghley Horse Trials.

== CCI5* results ==
Results
Event	Kentucky	Badminton	Luhmühlen	Burghley	Pau	Adelaide
2004		14th (Softly Softly III)				
2005		14th (Lenamore); WD (Softly Softly III)		5th (Lenamore)		
2006		36th (Lenamore)				
2007		12th (Lenamore)		23rd (Lenamore)		
2008		4th (Lenamore); 22nd (Mac Macdonald)				
2009		9th (Lenamore)		6th (Lenamore)		
2010		5th (Lenamore)		(gold) (Lenamore)		
2011		6th (Lenamore); 31st (Boston Two Tip)	15th (Mrs Tilly)	4th (Lenamore); 52nd (Mrs Tilly)	22nd (Boston Two Tip)	
2012				14th (Boston Two Tip)	8th (Onwards and Upwards)	
2013		21st (Onwards and Upwards); 33rd (Boston Two Tip)			23rd (Onwards and Upwards)	
2014		WD (Onwards and Upwards)				
2015		EL (Onwards and Upwards)				
2016				8th (Onwards and Upwards)	26th (Spice Sensation); 27th (Flying Finish)	
2017			WD (Sinatra Frank Baby); RET (Spice Sensation)	29th (Spice Sensation); WD (Onwards and Upwards)	17th (Up Up and Away); RET (On The Brash)	
2018		29th (On The Brash); 31st (Up Up And Away)		31st (On The Brash)	WD (Spice Sensation)	
2019				20th (On The Brash)		
2023		30th (On Greenacres Special Cavalier)				
2024		Winner (On Greenacres Special Cavalier)				
EL = Eliminated; RET = Retired; WD = Withdrew

== International championship results ==
Results
Year	Event	Horse	Placing	Notes
2006	World Equestrian Games	Lenamore	6th	Team
2006	World Equestrian Games	Lenamore	26th	Individual
2007	World Young Horse Championships	Cathpair High Hopes	8th	CCI*
2008	Olympic Games	Lenamore	5th	Team
2008	Olympic Games	Lenamore	14th	Individual
2010	World Equestrian Games	Mac Macdonald	3rd place, bronze medalist(s)	Team
2010	World Equestrian Games	Mac Macdonald	22nd	Individual
2010	World Young Horse Championships	Onwards and Upwards	12th	CCI**
2012	Olympic Games	Lenamore	3rd place, bronze medalist(s)	Team
2012	Olympic Games	Lenamore	29th	Individual
2013	World Young Horse Championships	Stellor Seaurchin	7th	CCI*
2015	World Young Horse Championships	Chance Encounter	8th	CCI*
2019	World Young Horse Championships	Greenacres Special Cavalier	17th	CCI**
2019	World Young Horse Championships	Rock Midnight	22nd	CCI**
2020	World Young Horse Championships	Greenacres Special Cavalier	17th	CCI***
EL = Eliminated; RET = Retired; WD = Withdrew

== Notable horses ==
- Lenamore - 1993 Gray Irish Sport Horse Gelding (Sea Crest x Valiyar)
  - 2006 World Equestrian Games - Team Sixth Place, Individual 26th Place
  - 2008 Beijing Olympics - Team Fifth Place, Individual 16th Place
  - 2010 Burghley CCI**** Winner
  - 2012 London Olympics - Team Bronze Medal, Individual 29th Place
- Cathpair High Hopes - 2001 Chestnut Thoroughbred Gelding (Accondy x Royal Fountain)
  - 2007 FEI Eventing Young Horse World Championships - Eighth Place
- Mac Macdonald - 2000 Chestnut Gelding (Blaze of Gold)
  - 2010 World Equestrian Games - Team Bronze Medal, Individual 22nd Place
- Greenacres Special Cavalier - 2014 Brown Irish Sport Horse Mare (Cavalier Royale x Greenacres Touch)
  - 2024 CCI5* Badminton Horse Trials - 1st Place
