= Sam Griffiths =

Australian equestrian

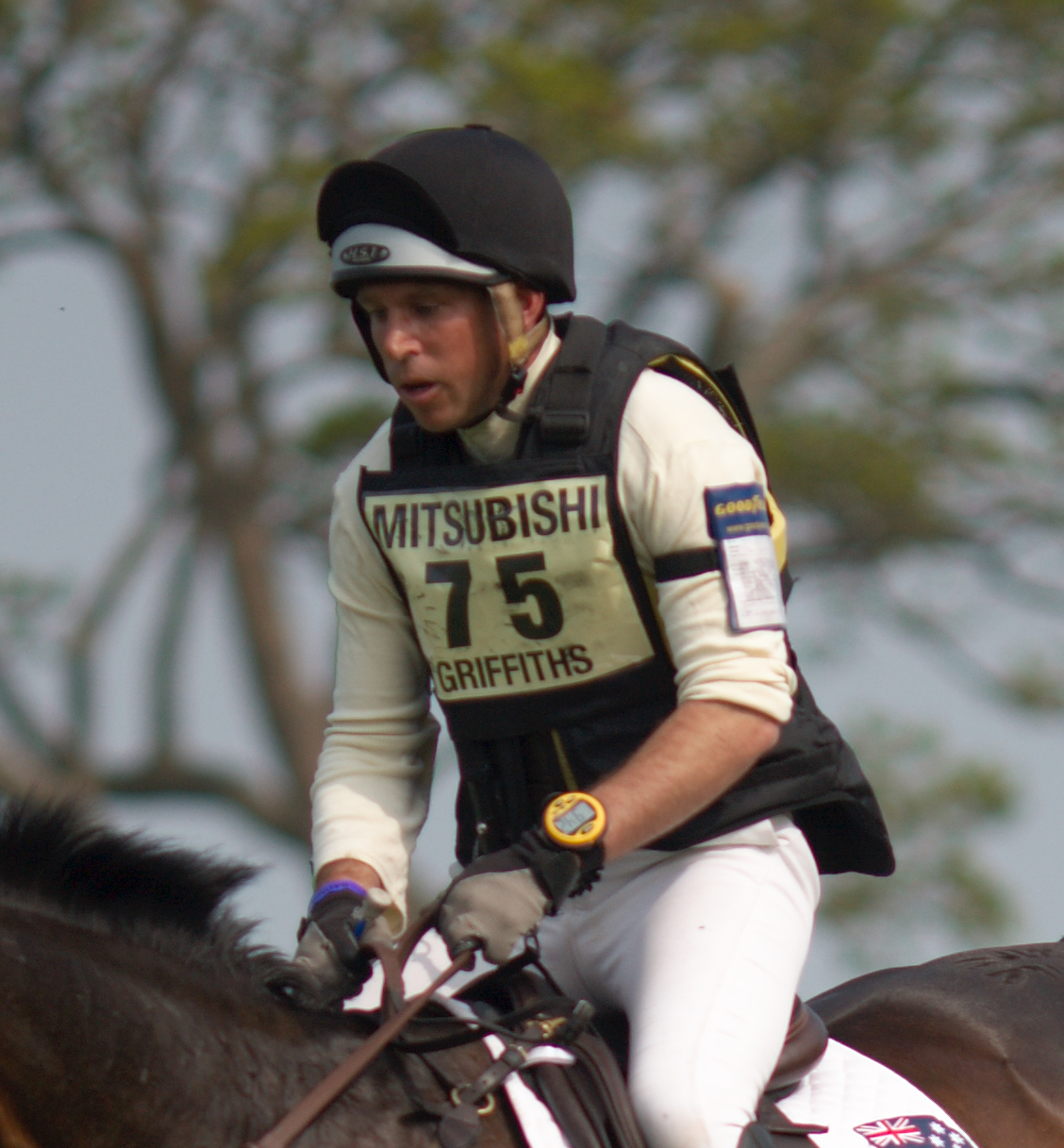
- Sam Griffiths and Happy Times at the Quarry during the cross-country phase of Badminton Horse Trials 2011.

Medal record

Equestrian

Representing Australia

Olympic Games
Bronze medal – third place	2016 Rio de Janeiro	Team eventing

Sam Griffiths is an Australian Eventing rider from Pearcedale in Victoria. 2017 saw him as the Ambassador to the Mitsubishi Motors Adelaide International Horse Trials. 4th individually at the 2016 Rio de Janeiro Olympic Games and part of the Bronze medal winning team. He won the 2014 Mitsubishi Motors Badminton Horse Trials riding Paulank Brockagh who he later went on to ride in the FEI World Equestrian Games. Winner of the 2014 Event Rider of the Year L'Année Hippique Awards. At the 2012 Summer Olympics he competed in the Individual and Team eventing, but fell during the cross-country event and did not finish. He was originally selected as the second reserve rider, but entered the team when two other Australian horses were unable to compete. Now based in the UK competing himself and training other riders.

== CCI5* Results ==
Results
Event	Kentucky	Badminton	Luhmühlen	Burghley	Pau	Adelaide	Bicton
2004		6th (Private Colin); 34th (Chamois IV)		17th (Private Colin)			
2005				15th (Connigar Bay)			
2006		26th (Connigar Bay)		8th (Connigar Bay)			
2007		WD (Connigar Bay)		11th (Connigar Bay)			
2008		26th (Connigar Bay)					
2009		(bronze) (Happy Times)		(bronze) (Happy Times)			
2010	Did not participate						
2011		4th (Happy Times)		16th (Happy Times)			
2012				9th (Happy Times)			
2013		15th (Happy Times); 43rd (Paulank Brockagh)		12th (Happy Times); 13th (Paulank Brockagh)			
2014		(gold) (Paulank Brockagh)		(bronze) (Happy Times)			
2015		10th (Paulank Brockagh); RET (Happy Times)		9th (Paulank Brockagh); 27th (Happy Times)			
2016		29th (Paulank Brockagh)		RET (Happy Times)			
2017		34th (Paulank Brockagh)			8th (Paulank Brockagh)		
2018		15th (Paulank Brockaugh)					
2019		RET (Billy Liffy)	7th (Paulank Brockagh)				
2021							13th (Gutera Cher)
EL = Eliminated; RET = Retired; WD = Withdrew

== Notable Horses ==
- Private Colin- 1994 Bay Gelding
  - 2003 Asian Pacific Championships - Team Gold Medal, Individual Silver Medal
- In The Groove - 1989 Bay Irish Sport Horse Gelding
  - 2003 FEI World Cup Final - 19th Place
- Noble Opposition - 1997 Bay Gelding
  - 2004 FEI Eventing Young Horse World Championships - 17th Place
- Motion Bound - 2001 Brown Gelding (Farrington Spondulicks x Horace)
  - 2008 FEI Eventing Young Horse World Championships - 16th Place
- Happy Times - 1999 Bay Oldenburg Gelding (Heraldik XX x Maraschino)
  - 2012 London Olympic Games - Team Sixth Place
- Paulank Brockagh - 2003 Bay Irish Sport Horse Mare (Touchdown x Trigerrero)
  - 2014 Badminton CCI**** Winner
  - 2014 World Equestrian Games - Team Fourth Place, Individual 16th Place
  - 2016 Rio Olympics - Team Bronze Medal, Individual Fourth Place
