= Elaine Pen =

Dutch equestrian (born 1990)

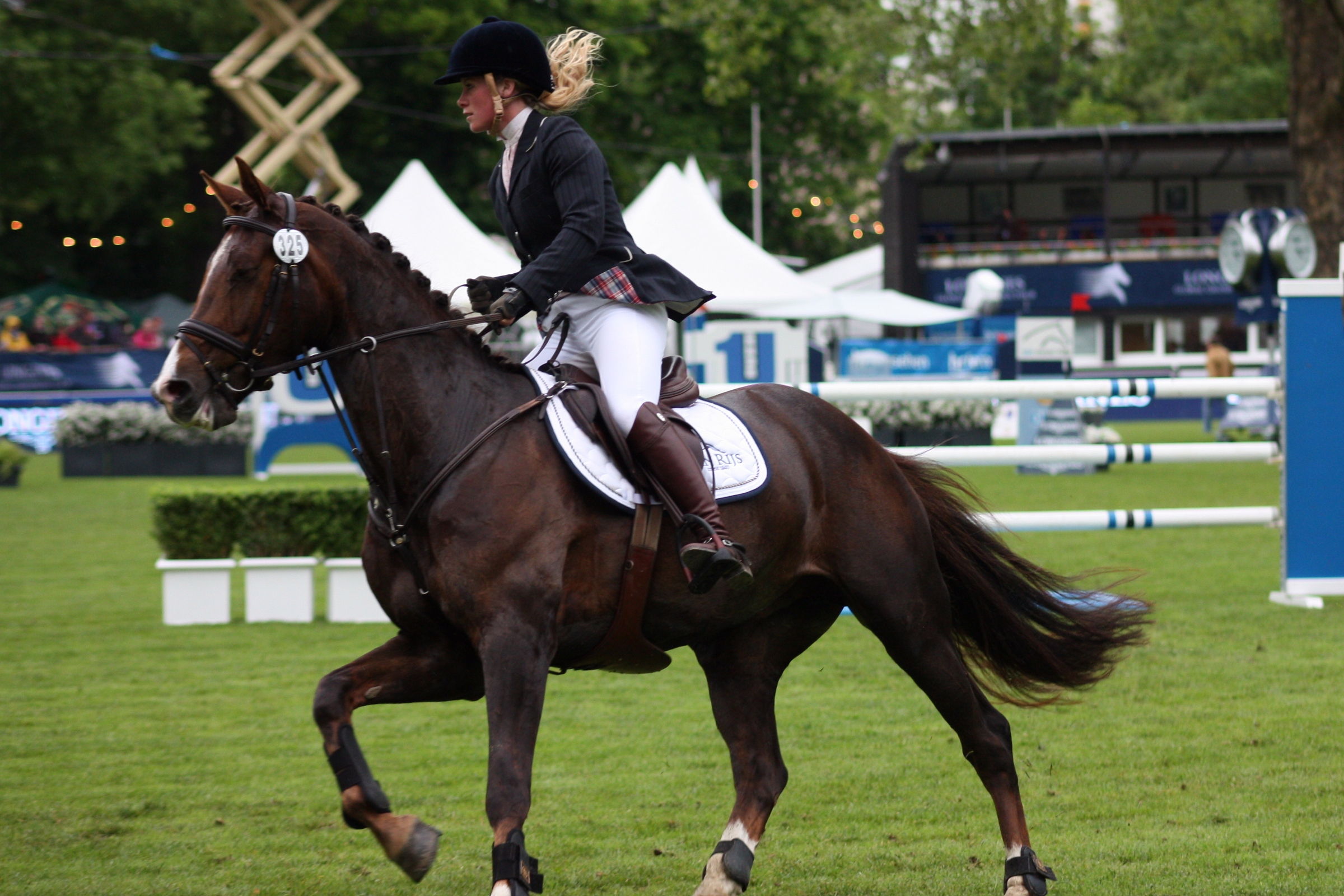
- Elaine Pen and Vira (2013)

Personal information
- Full name: Elaine Lucia Pen
- Born: 2 February 1990 (age 36); Leiden, Netherlands
- Height: 168 cm (5 ft 6 in)
Medal record
Equestrian
Representing the Netherlands
World Equestrian Games
Bronze medal – third place	2014 Normandy	Team eventing

Elaine Pen (born 2 February 1990 in Leiden) is a Dutch equestrian. At the 2012 Summer Olympics she competed in the Individual eventing and the team eventing as part of the Dutch team.
