= Dirk Schrade =

German equestrian (born 1978)

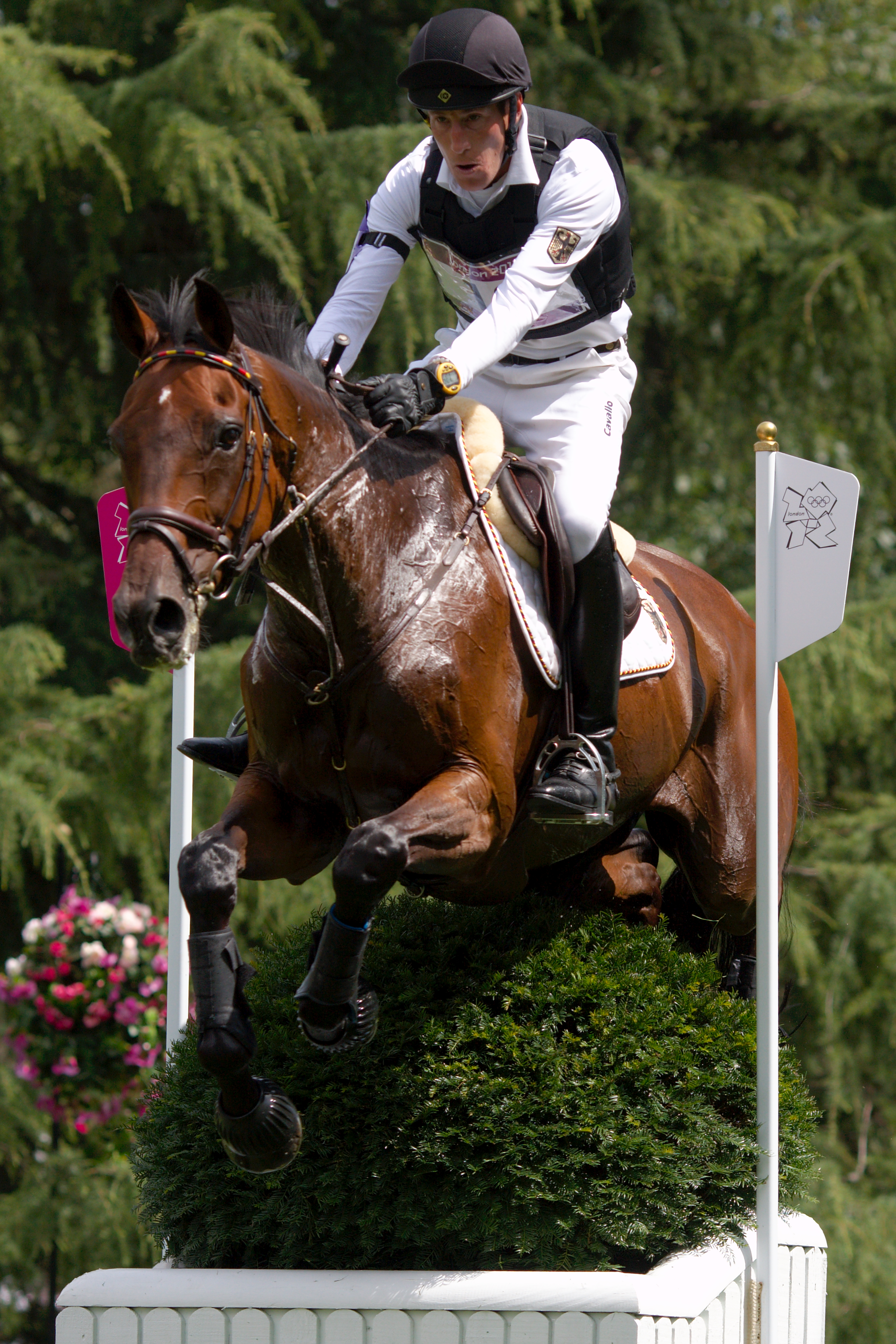
- Dirk Schrade and King Artus competing at the 2012 Summer Olympics in London

Medal record

Equestrian

Representing Germany

Olympic Games
| Gold medal – first place | 2012 London | Team eventing |

World Equestrian Games
| Gold medal – first place | 2014 Normandy | Team eventing |

European Championships
| Gold medal – first place | 2013 Malmo | Team eventing |
| Gold medal – first place | 2015 Blair Castle | Team eventing |

Dirk Schrade (born 29 June 1978 in Münsingen) is a German equestrian. At the 2012 Summer Olympics he competed in the Individual eventing and team eventing, where Germany won the gold medal.

== Notable horses ==
- Grand Amour 7 - 2000 Dark Bay Bavarian Warmblood Mare (Cabaret x Weltrang L)
  - 2007 FEI Eventing Young Horse World Championships - 12th Place
- Plan B - 2002 Bay Westfalen Gelding (Pavarotti van de Helle x Labrador)
  - 2008 FEI Eventing Young Horse World Championships - 19th Place
- King Artus - 1996 Bay Holsteiner Gelding (King Milford XX x Lorenz)
  - 2009 Pau CCI**** Winner
  - 2009 FEI World Cup Final - 11th Place
  - 2011 European Championships - Fourth Place Individual
  - 2012 London Olympics - Team Gold Medal, Individual 26th Place
- Gadget de la Cere - 1994 Bay Anglo Arabian Gelding (Athos de Ceran x Samuel)
  - 2010 World Equestrian Games - Team Fifth Place
- Hop and Skip - 1999 Chestnut British Sport Horse Gelding (Skippy II)
  - 2013 European Championships - Team Gold Medal, Individual Sixth Place
  - 2014 World Equestrian Games - Team Gold Medal
  - 2015 European Championships - Team Gold Medal, Individual Seventh Place
