= Tim Lips =

Dutch equestrian

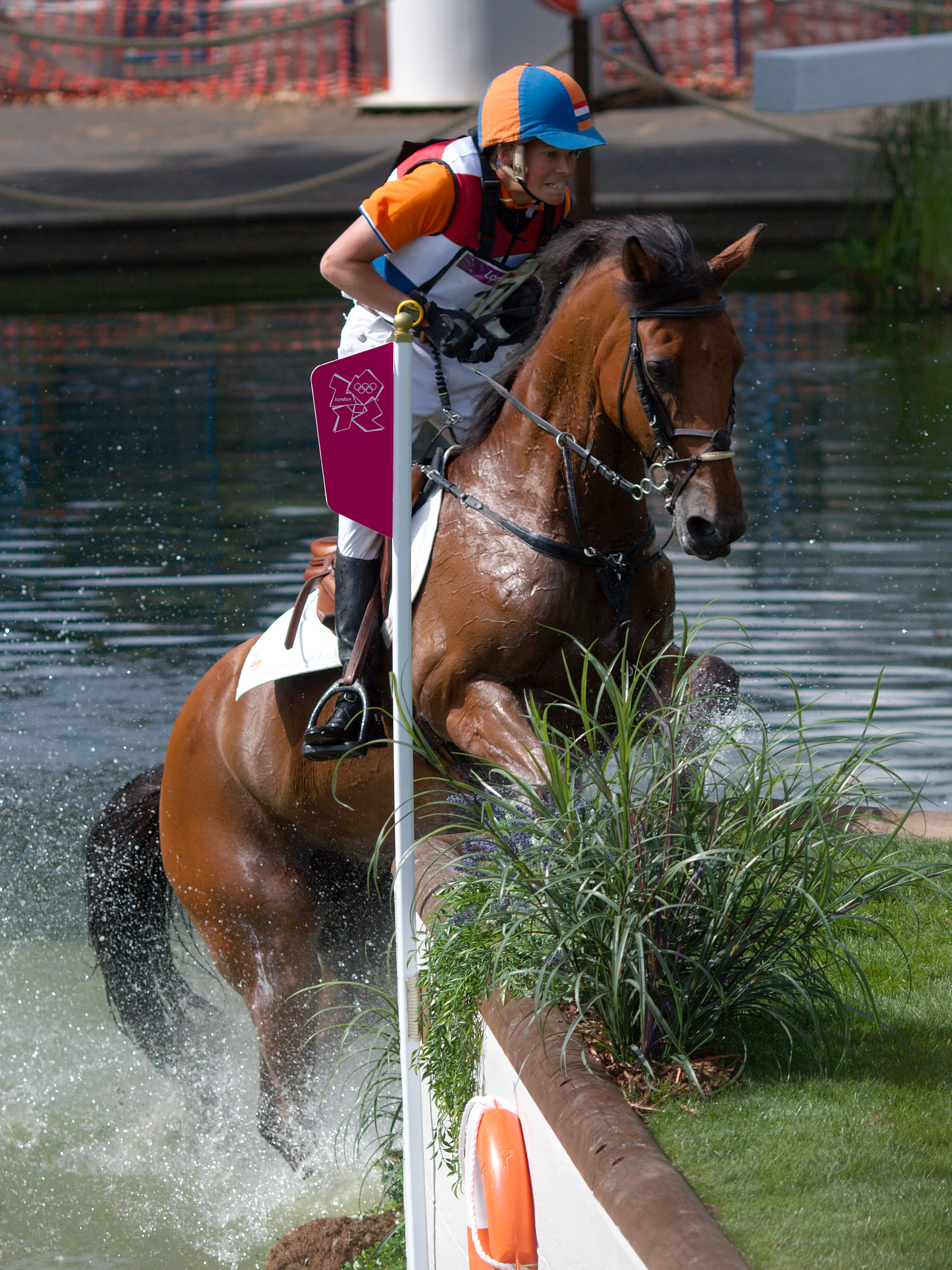
- Tim Lips and Oncarlos competing at the 2012 Summer Olympics in London.

Personal information
- Full name: Tim Lips
- Born: 7 October 1985 (age 40); Made, Netherlands
- Height: 5 ft 6 in (168 cm)
- Weight: 123 lb (56 kg)
- Horse(s): Oncarlos (1996); Van Schijndel's Owaola (1996); Odion B (1996); Urbain M (2001); Windjammer (2003); Vilenzo (2002); Verado; Ziggy
Medal record
Equestrian sports
Representing the Netherlands
World Equestrian Games
Bronze medal – third place	2014 Normandy	Team eventing

Tim Lips (born 7 October 1985 in Made) is a Dutch eventer.

== Biography ==
Both his parents were active in equestrian as well and Lips knew he wanted to be successful in the sport from a young age. Already at the age of 8 he was getting decent results in show jumping and he created experienced ponies out of total inexperienced ones. At the age of 19 he and his father decided to check if eventing could be a successful discipline for Lips. After a few tries he decided eventig would become his future sport. Besides his top horse Oncarlos, Lips rides 8 to 10 horses a day in the professional accommodation in his home town of Made. These are his own horses, as well as other horses brought in by other people to prepare them for events. Lips is even in the position to enter the show jumping events himself with those horses from time to time. This gives him a continuous rhythm and he can prepare his horses for a 1.35m height, which makes sure the eventing heights are no problem for his horses. Lips is part of the A-class Seniors Eventing of the KNHS (The Royal Dutch Equestrian Association) as well as the Rabobank Talents Team, which is a project of the Rabobank and the KNHS to discover young talented riders at an early age.

Lips won two eventing races in the M-Class in 2005 both with Oncarlos, in IJsselstein and Barchem, he also reached a second place in Bathmen, also on Oncarlos. In 2006 he placed second in the CCI meeting in Jaroszwoka, Poland and third in Ede. On this last event he also became the Dutch national Young Rider champion. At the European Championships for Young Riders in Pardubice, Czech Republic he placed fifteenth, but managed to get the award for Best Equestrian. He continued his year by winning a CIC event in Varsseveld and placing second in Nichelino. His 10th-place finish at the CIC event in Boekelo, 2007, was enough for him to claim the Dutch national title. During his first World Cup appearance in Fontainebleau he finished on the 30th position. In Ede he became 2nd in the CIC competition with Oncarlos and third in the CCI competition with Van Schijndel's Owaola. At the CICO in Aachen he finished in 13th position and with the Dutch team he finished in 5th position.

In April 2008 Lips and Oncarlos finished on the seventh position of the CCI race in Vairano. Later he became third in Outdoor Gelderland with Van Schijndels Owaola and in July he finished second in the CHIO Aachen, the World's largest equestrian meeting. This earned enough points to be among the top 30 at the World Rankings, which gave him the international nomination for the 2008 Summer Olympics. Because he also achieved the Dutch standards (finishing among the top 12 in this tournament) the qualification was a fact.

At the 2012 Summer Olympics, he finished in 38th place in the individual and was part of the Dutch team that finished in 11th place.

== CCI 5* Results ==
Results
Event	Kentucky	Badminton	Luhmühlen	Burghley	Pau	Adelaide
2009	9th (Concrex Oncarlos)					
2010	Did not participate					
2011			12th (Concrex Oncarlos)			
2012	Did not participate					
2013			15th (Keyflow)			
2014		7th (Keyflow)				
2015		21st (Keyflow)	7th (Bayro)		11th (Bayro) 28th (Trademark)	
2016	Did not participate					
2017			11th (Bayro)			
2018			20th (Bayro)			
EL = Eliminated; RET = Retired; WD = Withdrew

== International Championship results ==
Results
Year	Event	Horse	Placing	Notes
2006	European Young Rider Championships	Concrex Oncarlos	6th	Team
2006	European Young Rider Championships	Concrex Oncarlos	15th	Individual
2008	Olympic Games	Concrex Oncarlos	15th	Individual
2009	European Championships	Concrex Owaloa	7th	Team
2009	European Championships	Concrex Owaloa	EL	Individual
2010	World Equestrian Games	Concrex Oncarlos	EL	Individual
2011	European Championships	Concrex Oncarlos	7th	Team
2011	European Championships	Concrex Oncarlos	28th	Individual
2012	Olympic Games	Concrex Oncarlos	11th	Team
2012	Olympic Games	Concrex Oncarlos	38th	Individual
2013	European Championships	Keyflow	9th	Team
2013	European Championships	Keyflow	7th	Individual
2014	World Equestrian Games	Keyflow	3rd place, bronze medalist(s)	Team
2014	World Equestrian Games	Keyflow	17th	Individual
2015	European Championships	Keyflow	4th	Team
2015	European Championships	Keyflow	18th	Individual
2016	Olympic Games	Bayro	6th	Team
2016	Olympic Games	Bayro	21st	Individual
2019	European Championships	Bayro	9th	Team
2019	European Championships	Bayro	6th	Individual
2019	World Young Horse Championships	Herby	RET	CCI***
EL = Eliminated; RET = Retired; WD = Withdrew
