= Jonathan Paget =

New Zealand equestrian

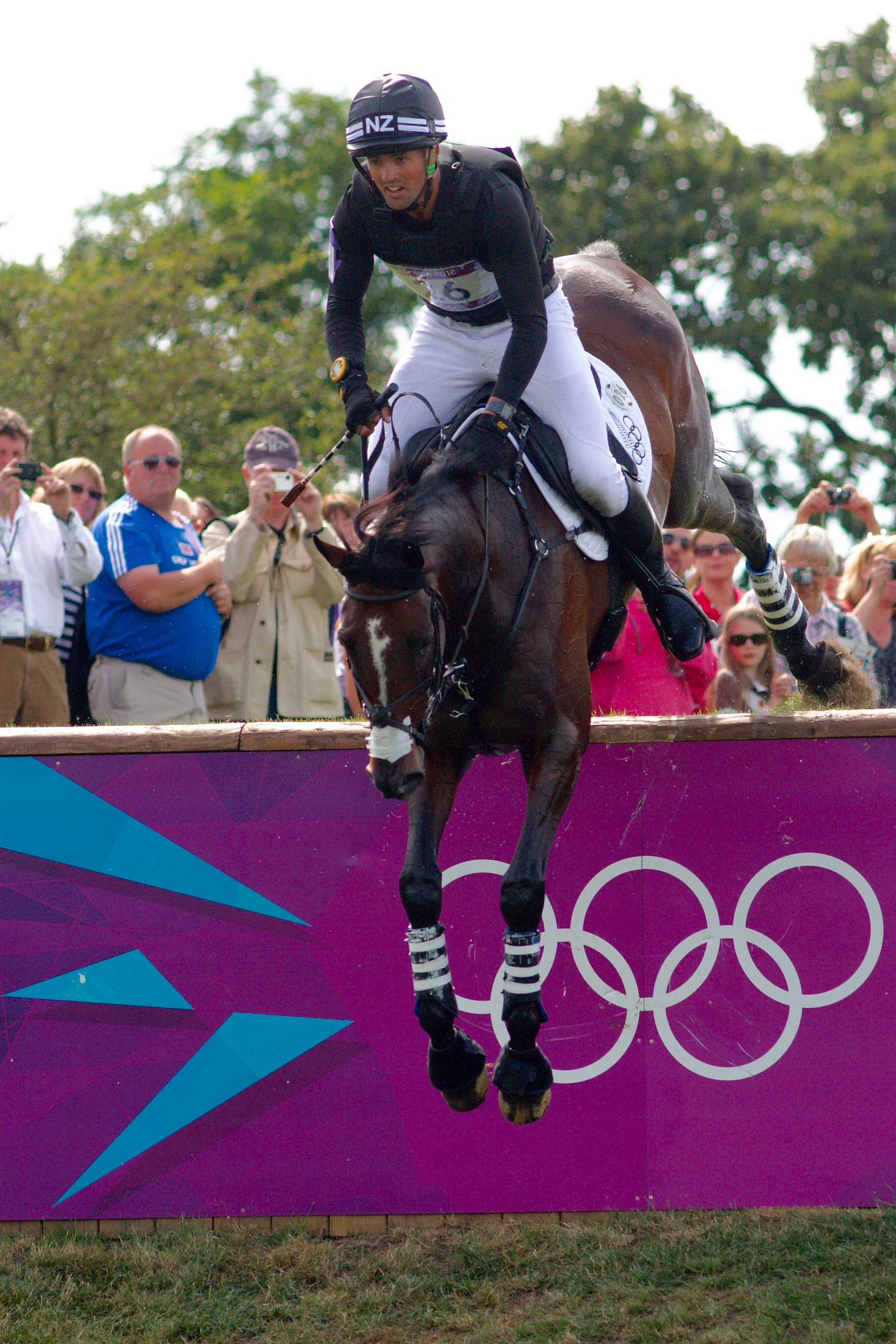
- Paget and Clifton Promise competing at the 2012 Olympics.

Medal record

Representing New Zealand

Equestrian

Olympic Games
Bronze medal – third place	2012 London	Team eventing

Jonathan "Jock" Paget (born 17 November 1983) is a New Zealand equestrian who won a bronze medal in Team eventing at the 2012 Summer Olympics. In 2013 he became only the second rider to win the Badminton Horse Trials on debut after fellow New Zealander Mark Todd.

== Early life ==
Paget was born in Wellsford before moving to Sydney, Australia in 1986. After completing his education he undertook an apprenticeship as a bricklayer and began riding at age 18. He went to rodeo school and applied for a working pupil role with Australian event rider Kevin McNab in Tamborine, Queensland. Under McNab's tutelage Paget progressed from never having jumped a fence, to competing at three-star level eventing in less than two years. After working for McNab for three years, he went to Sydney in 2006 to set up a business producing and competing horses. However, the 2007 Australian equine influenza outbreak near Sydney in August resulted in all horse movements being halted on much of the east coast of Australia.

With no ability to ride in Australia, Paget was invited by Frances Stead, a former Auckland businesswoman and strong supporter of New Zealand eventing riders and horses, to return to New Zealand in September 2007 to become the principal rider at her Clifton Eventers base at Muriwai, north-west of Auckland.

== Competitive career ==
He competed on Clifton Promise, a 16.3 hands (67 inches, 170 cm) bay Thoroughbred gelding, born 2 November 1998) in April 2010 in their first CCI****, the Rolex Kentucky Three Day, where he finished in 27th place. In June 2010, Paget and Clifton Promise went to the United Kingdom to prepare for the 2010 FEI World Equestrian Games (WEG), which was held in Kentucky in October of that year, the pair finished seventh.

Whilst Clifton Promise returned to the UK, Paget returned to New Zealand to compete in their Spring season on several other Clifton horses, returning to his Surrey base in the UK in February 2011. Frances Stead sent several more young horses to the UK for Paget to compete in the Spring season there, including Clifton Razz, Clifton Signature, Clifton Cognac and later Clifton Dickara.

Since his move to be based in Surrey, England, Paget has worked closely with fellow New Zealanders Mark Todd and Andrew Nicholson, as well as the UK-based New Zealand Eventing Coach, Erik Duvander. In March 2011, he took over the ride of Clifton Lush from fellow New Zealand rider, Joe Meyer.

In October 2013 Paget was suspended from national and international competitions after his horse Clifton Promise tested positive for reserpine, a banned substance. Paget later said he had no idea how the drug – a sedative – came to be in his horse, and vowed to clear his name with a B sample test. He was cleared in August 2014 and allowed to return immediately to competition.

== Placings and awards ==
=== 2009 ===
- Won 'Eventer of the Year' title at NZ Horse of the Year Show

=== 2010 ===
- Won 'Eventer of the Year' title at NZ Horse of the Year Show.
- 27th on Clifton Promise at Rolex Kentucky Three Day. This was both Paget's and Clifton Promise's first ever four-star competition.
- Seventh on Clifton Promise at the 2010 FEI World Equestrian Games 2010 (Paget rode as an individual and was not a member of the New Zealand team, which won the Team Bronze Medal).

=== 2011 ===
- Won the Bramham Horse Trials on Clifton Lush
- Member of New Zealand Silver Medal winning team at the 2011 CHIO Aachen World Equestrian Festival on Clifton Promise
- Third on Clifton Lush at the Gatcombe British Open Championship
- Fifth on Clifton Lush and 12th on Clifton Promise at the Burghley Horse Trials
- 17th on Clifton Razz at Blenheim Horse Trials, part of first-placed New Zealand team

=== 2012 ===
- Sixth on Clifton Promise at Rolex Kentucky Three Day
- Tenth individually and team bronze for New Zealand on Clifton Promise at 2012 London Olympics
- Fifth on Clifton Lush at Burghley Horse Trials
- Second on Clifton Promise at Étoiles de Pau

=== 2013 ===
- Won the Mitsubishi Motors Badminton Horse Trials on Clifton Promise, also finished 14th on Clifton Lush
- Won the British open on Clifton Lush

=== 2014 ===
- Second on Clifton Promise at the Land Rover Burghley Horse Trials
