= Hawley Bennett-Awad =

Canadian equestrian

Hawley Awad
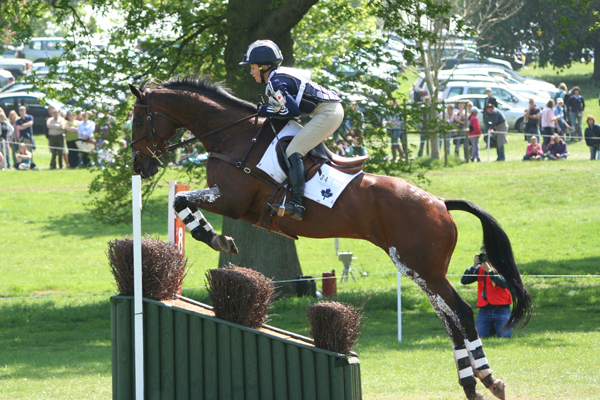
- Hawley Awad (2007)

Personal information
- Born: 6 May 1977 (age 49) Langley, British Columbia

Sport
- Country: Canada
- Sport: Equestrian
- Event: Eventing
Medal record
Equestrian
Representing Canada
World Equestrian Games
Silver medal – second place	2010 Kentucky	Team Eventing
Pan American Games
Silver medal – second place	2003 Fair Hill	Team Eventing
Silver medal – second place	2011 Guadalajara	Team Eventing

Hawley Awad (born Hawley Bennett in Langley, British Columbia on 6 May 1977) is a Canadian Equestrian Team athlete who competed for Canada at the 2004 and 2012 Summer Olympics in eventing. She was also on the eventing team that won a team silver medal at the 2011 Pan American Games.

== CCI5* results ==
Results
Event	Kentucky	Badminton	Luhmühlen	Burghley	Pau	Adelaide
2003	28th (Livingstone)					
2004	Did not participate					
2005	19th (Livingstone)					
2006	Did not participate					
2007		30th (Livingstone)				
2008	17th (Livingstone)					
2009	Did not participate					
2010	9th (Gin & Juice)					
2011		41st (Gin & Juice)		50th (Gin & Juice)		
2012	Did not participate					
2013	7th (Gin & Juice)				16th (Gin & Juice)	
2014	16th (Gin & Juice)					
2015-16	Did not participate					
2017	12th (Jollybo)					
2018	RET (Jollybo)					
2019	20th (Jollybo)					
EL = Eliminated; RET = Retired; WD = Withdrew

== International Championship Results ==
Results
Event	World Cup Final	Pan American Games	World Equestrian Games	Olympic Games
2003		Livingstone (silver) Team; 15th Individual		
2004				Livingstone 12th Team; 63rd Individual
2005	Livingstone; 15th Individual			
2010			Gin & Juice (silver) Team; 17th Individual	
2011		Five O'Clock Somewhere (silver) Team; 24th Individual		
2012				Gin & Juice 13th Team; EL Individual
2014			Gin & Juice 6th Team; EL Individual	
2018			Jollybo; 50th Individual	
EL = Eliminated; RET = Retired; WD = Withdrew

== Notable Horses ==
- Livingstone - 1990 Dark Bay Thoroughbred Gelding (Wander Kind)
  - 2003 Pan American Games - Team Silver Medal, Individual 15th Place
  - 2004 Athens Olympics - Team 12th Place, Individual 63rd Place
  - 2005 FEI Eventing World Cup Final - 15th Place
- Gin & Juice - 2000 Bay Thoroughbred Mare (Audio)
  - 2010 World Equestrian Games - Team Silver Medal, Individual 17th Place
  - 2012 London Olympics - Team 12th Place
  - 2014 World Equestrian Games - Team Sixth Place
- Five O'Clock Somewhere - 2001 Bay Thoroughbred Gelding (Audio)
  - 2011 Pan American Games - Team Silver Medal, Individual 24th Place

• “Jollybo” 2004 bay british sport horse mare

== Personal ==
Her uncle, Ian Bennett, was the President of the Royal Canadian Mint.
