= Algotsson =

Algotsson is a surname. Notable people with the surname include:

- Bengt Algotsson (died 1360), Swedish noble
- Håkan Algotsson (born 1966), Swedish ice hockey goaltender
- Linda Algotsson (born 1972), Swedish equestrian
- Matilda Algotsson (born 1998), Swedish figure skater
- Sara Algotsson Ostholt (born 1974), Swedish equestrian
