= European Eventing Championships =

Equestrian event

The European Eventing Championships, like most other European Championships, is held every two years. Today it is a four star eventing competition. A four star event is one step down from the grand slam which consists of three five star events.

The first Championships were held at Badminton in 1953, where six teams (Britain, France, Ireland, Netherlands, Sweden and Switzerland) were sent, although only Britain and Switzerland were able to get their horses fit in time to actually compete. However, 10 teams were able to compete at the 1959 competition.

The 1995 and 1997 European Championships were held as part of events open to non-European riders (in Pratoni del Vivaro, Italy in 1995 and Burghley, England in 1997) with the top three European individuals and teams receiving medals. The first woman to win the competition was Shelia Wilcox in 1957, although women were not allowed to compete in the Olympics in eventing until 1964.

There is also a Championship held for young riders, juniors and ponies.

== Format ==
The Championships offers both team and individual gold, silver, and bronze medals.

Each nation may bring a team of four riders and two individuals. The team riders also compete for the individual gold, silver, and bronze medals. The host nation may bring up to eight individual riders, with a total squad of 12.

The best three scores among the teams—the team with the lowest number of penalty points—receive the gold, silver, and bronze medals. However, a team must have at least three riders completing the competition, or else they will be eliminated. If a team has four riders complete, there is a drop-score in their results. If three riders complete, all three scores are added into the final total for the team.

Beginning in 2005, the European Eventing Championships was held in the short-format, without the phases A, B, and C (roads and tracks, and steeplechase) on speed and endurance day. It included just the dressage, cross-country, and show jumping phases.

The competition begins with a horse inspection to make sure all competing horses are sound before beginning the dressage. Then the nations nominate their four team riders and the order they wish them to compete, before the order of nations is determined. The order of go is especially important on cross country day, when the first competitors have the best footing, but do not know how the course will ride, while the later competitors will know the tricky obstacles on course, but may have to run their horses on torn up or sloppy footing.

== Casualties and incidents ==
- 2017 - Bob the Builder ridden by Michal Knap (POL) was euthanized after breaking his right front long pastern bone when he fell at fence 15.

== Past winners ==
Britain's Ginny Elliot and Germany's Michael Jung are currently the only riders to have won the individual European Champion title three times in succession: Elliot became European Champion in 1985, 1987, and 1989; Jung became European Champion in 2011, 2013 and 2015.

On eight occasions, riders of a single nation have swept the podium, winning all three medals; Great Britain on 7 occasions, most recently in 2021 and Germany once in 2011.

=== Individual results ===
Individual medalists
Year	Location	Gold	Silver	Bronze
1953	(United Kingdom) Badminton	(United Kingdom) Laurence Rook on Starlight	(United Kingdom) Frank Weldon on Kilbarry	(Switzerland) Hans Schwarzenbach on Vae Victis
1954	(Switzerland) Basel	(United Kingdom) Bertie Hill on Crispin	(United Kingdom) Frank Weldon on Kilbarry	(United Kingdom) Laurence Rook on Starlight
1955	(United Kingdom) Windsor	(United Kingdom) Frank Weldon on Kilbarry	(United Kingdom) John Oram on Radar	(United Kingdom) Bertie Hill on Countryman
1957	(Denmark) Copenhagen	(United Kingdom) Sheila Willcox on High and Mighty	(West Germany) August Lütke-Westhüs on Franco	(Sweden) Jonas Lindgren on Eldorado
1959	(United Kingdom) Harewood	(Switzerland) Hans Schwarzenbach on Burn Trout	(United Kingdom) Frank Weldon on Samuel Johnson	(United Kingdom) Derek Allhusen on Laurien
1962	(United Kingdom) Burghley	(United Kingdom) James Templer on M'Lord Conelly	(Soviet Union) German Gazyumov on Granj	(United Kingdom) Jane Wykeham-Musgrave on Ryebrooks
1965	(Soviet Union) Moscow	(Poland) Marian Babirecki on Volt	(Soviet Union) Lev Baklyshkin on Evlon	(West Germany) Horst Karsten on Condora
1967	(Republic of Ireland) Punchestown	(Republic of Ireland) Eddie Boylan on Durlas Eile	(United Kingdom) Martin Whiteley on The Poacher	(United Kingdom) Derek Allhusen on Lochinvar
1969	(France) Haras national du Pin	(United Kingdom) Mary Gordon-Watson on Cornishman	(United Kingdom) Richard Walker on Pasha	(West Germany) Bernd Messmann on Windspiel
1971	(United Kingdom) Burghley	(United Kingdom) The Princess Anne on Doublet	(United Kingdom) Debbie West on Baccarat	(United Kingdom) Stuart Stevens on Classic Chips
1973	(Soviet Union) Kyiv	(Soviet Union) Aleksandr Yevdokimov on Jeger	(West Germany) Herbert Blöcker on Albrant	(West Germany) Horst Karsten on Sioux
1975	(West Germany) Luhmühlen	(United Kingdom) Lucinda Prior-Palmer on Be Fair	(United Kingdom) The Princess Anne on Goodwill	(Soviet Union) Pyotr Gornushko on Gusar
1977	(United Kingdom) Burghley	(United Kingdom) Lucinda Prior-Palmer on George	(West Germany) Karl Schultz on Madrigal	(West Germany) Horst Karsten on Sioux
1979	(West Germany) Luhmühlen	(Denmark) Nils Haagensen on Monaco	(United Kingdom) Rachel Bayliss on Gurgle The Geek	(West Germany) Rüdiger Schwarz on Power Game
1981	(Denmark) Horsens	(Switzerland) Hansueli Schmutz on Oran	(West Germany) Helmut Rethemeier on Santiago	(Republic of Ireland) Brian McSweeney on Inis Mean
1983	(Switzerland) Frauenfeld	(United Kingdom) Rachel Bayliss on Mystic Minstrel	(United Kingdom) Lucinda Prior-Palmer on Regal Realm	(Sweden) Christian Persson on Joël
1985	(United Kingdom) Burghley	(United Kingdom) Virginia Holgate on Priceless	(United Kingdom) Lorna Clarke on Myross	(United Kingdom) Ian Stark on Oxford Blue
1987	(West Germany) Luhmühlen	(United Kingdom) Virginia Leng on Night Cap	(United Kingdom) Ian Stark on Sir Wattie	(West Germany) Claus Erhorn on Justyn Thyme
1989	(United Kingdom) Burghley	(United Kingdom) Virginia Leng on Master Craftsman	(United Kingdom) Jane Thelwall on King's Jester	(United Kingdom) Lorna Clarke-Sutherland on Fearliath Mor
1991	(Republic of Ireland) Punchestown	(United Kingdom) Ian Stark on Glenburnie	(United Kingdom) Richard Walker on Jacana	(United Kingdom) Karen Straker on Get Smart
1993	(Germany) Achselschwang	(France) Jean-Lou Bigot on Twist La Beige	(United Kingdom) Kristina Gifford on Song and Dance Man	(Netherlands) Eddy Stibbe on Bahlua
1995	(Italy) Pratoni del Vivaro	(Republic of Ireland) Lucy Thompson on Welton Romance	(France) Marie-Christine Duroy on Ut Du Placineau	(United Kingdom) Mary King on King William
1997	(United Kingdom) Burghley	(Germany) Bettina Hoy on Watermill Stream	(United Kingdom) William Fox-Pitt on Cosmopolitan II	(United Kingdom) Kristina Gifford on General Jock
1999	(Germany) Luhmühlen	(United Kingdom) Pippa Funnell on Supreme Rock	(Sweden) Linda Algotsson on Stand By Me	(Sweden) Paula Törnqvist on Monaghan
2001	(France) Pau	(United Kingdom) Pippa Funnell on Supreme Rock	(Germany) Inken Johanssen on Brilliante	(Spain) Enrique Sarasola Jr. on Dope Doux
2003	(Republic of Ireland) Punchestown	(France) Nicolas Touzaint on Galan de Sauvagere	(Sweden) Linda Algotsson on Stand By Me	(United Kingdom) Pippa Funnell on Walk On Star
2005	(United Kingdom) Blenheim	(United Kingdom) Zara Phillips on Toytown	(United Kingdom) William Fox-Pitt on Tamarillo	(Germany) Ingrid Klimke on Sleep Late
2007	(Italy) Pratoni del Vivaro	(France) Nicolas Touzaint on Galan de Sauvagere	(United Kingdom) Mary King on Call Again Cavalier	(Germany) Bettina Hoy on Ringwood Cockatoo
2009	(France) Fontainebleau	(United Kingdom) Kristina Cook on Miners Frolic	(United Kingdom) Piggy French on Some Day Soon	(Germany) Michael Jung on Sam
2011	(Germany) Luhmühlen	(Germany) Michael Jung on Sam	(Germany) Sandra Auffarth on Opgun Louvo	(Germany) Frank Ostholt on Little Paint
2013	(Sweden) Malmö	(Germany) Michael Jung on Halunke	(Germany) Ingrid Klimke on Escada	(United Kingdom) William Fox-Pitt on Chilli Morning
2015	(United Kingdom) Blair Castle	(Germany) Michael Jung on Takinou	(Germany) Sandra Auffarth on Opgun Louvo	(France) Thibaut Vallette on Qing du Briot
2017	(Poland) Strzegom	(Germany) Ingrid Klimke on Hale Bob	(Germany) Michael Jung on Rocana	(United Kingdom) Nicola Wilson on Bulana
2019	(Germany) Luhmühlen	(Germany) Ingrid Klimke on Hale Bob	(Germany) Michael Jung on Chipmunk	(Republic of Ireland) Cathal Daniels on Rioghan Rua
2021	(Switzerland) Avenches	(United Kingdom) Nicola Wilson on Dublin	(United Kingdom) Piggy March on Brookfield Innocent	(United Kingdom) Sarah Bullimore on Corouet
2023	(France) Haras national du Pin	(United Kingdom) Ros Canter on Lordships Graffalo	(United Kingdom) Kitty King on Vendredi Biats	(Germany) Sandra Auffarth on Viamant du Matz
2025	(United Kingdom) Blenheim	(United Kingdom) Laura Collett on London 52	(Germany) Michael Jung on Fischerchipmunk FRH	(United Kingdom) Tom McEwen on JL Dublin

=== Team results ===
Team medalists
Year	Location	Gold	Silver	Bronze
1953	(United Kingdom) Badminton	Great Britain; Frank Weldon on Kilbarry; Reg Hindley on Speculation; Bertie Hill on Bambi	not awarded	not awarded
1954	(Switzerland) Basel	Great Britain; Bertie Hill on Crispin; Frank Weldon on Kilbarry; Laurence Rook on Starlight; Diana Mason on Tramella	West Germany; Wilhelm Büsing on Trux; August Lütke-Westhüs on Hubertus; Klaus Wagner on Dachs; Max Huck on Fockdra von Kamax	not awarded
1955	(United Kingdom) Windsor	Great Britain; Frank Weldon on Kilbarry; Bertie Hill on Countryman; Laurence Rook on Starlight; Diana Mason on Tramella	Switzerland; Anton Bühler on Uranus; Hans Bühler on Richard; Marc Büchler on Tizian; Andrea Zindel on Vae Victis	not awarded
1957	(Denmark) Copenhagen	Great Britain; Sheila Willcox on High & Mighty; Ted Marsh on Wild Venture; Derek Allhusen on Laurien; Kit Tatham-Warter on Pampas Cat	West Germany; August Lütke-Westhüs on Franko II; Siegfried Dehning on Fechtlanze; Reiner Klimke on Lausbub; Dieter Fösken	Sweden; Jonas Lindgren on Eldorado; Evert Petterson on Tom Raid; Petrus Kastenman on Illuster; K. G. Holm on Air
1959	(United Kingdom) Harewood	West Germany; August Lütke-Westhüs on Franko II; Ottokar Pohlmann on Polarfuchs; Siegfried Dehning on Fechtlanze; Reiner Klimke on Fortunat	Great Britain; Frank Weldon on Samuel Johnson; Derek Allhusen on Laurien; Jeremy Beale on Fulmer Folly; Sheila Waddington on Airs & Graces	France; Jéhan Le Roy on Garden; Pierre Durand Sr. on Guillano; Guy Lefrant on Nicias; Hugues Landon on Espionne
1962	(United Kingdom) Burghley	Soviet Union; German Gazyumov on Granj; Pavel Deyev on Satrap; Lev Baklyshkin on Khirurg; Saybattal Mursalimov	Ireland; Anthony Cameron on Sam Weller; Harry Freeman-Jackson on St Finbarr; Virginia Freeman-Jackson on Irish Lace; Patrick Conolly-Carew on Ballyhoo	Great Britain; Frank Weldon on Young Pretender; Michael Bullen on Sea Breeze; Susan Fleet on The Gladiator; Peter Welch on Mister Wilson
1965	(Soviet Union) Moscow	Soviet Union; Valentin Gorelkin; Saybattal Mursalimov on Dzhigit; Aleksandr Yevdokimov on Padarok; Lev Baklyshkin on Evlon	Ireland; Penelope Moreton on Loughlin; Virginia Freeman-Jackson on Sam Weller; Eddie Boylan on Durlas Eile; Anthony Cameron on Lough Druid	Great Britain; Derek Allhusen on Lochinvar; Richard Meade on Barberry; Christine Sheppard on Fenjirao; Reuben Jones on Master Bernard
1967	(Republic of Ireland) Punchestown	Great Britain; Martin Whitely on The Poacher; Derek Allhusen on Lochinvar; Reuben Jones on Foxdor; Richard Meade on Barberry	Ireland; Eddie Boylan on Durlas Eile; John Fowler on Dooney Rock; Virginia Stanhope on Sam Weller; Bill Mullins on March Hawk	France; Jean-Jacques Guyon on Pitou; Daniel Lechevallier on Opera; Henri Michel on Ouragan; Michel Cochenet on Artaban II
1969	(France) Haras national du Pin	Great Britain; Richard Walker on Pasha; Derek Allhusen on Lochinvar; Polly Hely-Hutchinson on Count Jasper; Reuben Jones on The Poacher	Soviet Union; Yuri Solos on Fat; Aleksandr Yevdokimov on Fahrad; Kamo Zakarian on Fugus; Y. Kepp on Hobot	West Germany; Bernd Messmann on Windspiel; Kurt Mergler on Adajio; Horst Karsten on Vaibel; Otto Ammermann om Alpaca
1971	(United Kingdom) Burghley	Great Britain; Debbie West on Baccarat; Richard Meade on The Poacher; Mary Gordon-Watson on Cornishman; Mark Phillips on Great Ovations	Soviet Union; Sergey Mukhin on Resfeder; Vladimir Soroka on Obzor; Aleksandr Yevdokimov on Farkhad; Yuri Solos on Rashod	Ireland; Bill McLernon on Ballangarry; Diana Wilson on Broken Promise; William Powell-Harris on Smokey VI; Ronnie McMahon on San Carlos
1973	(Soviet Union) Kyiv	West Germany; Herbert Blöcker on Albrant; Kurt Mergler on Vaibel; Horst Karsten on Sioux; Harry Klugmann on El Paso	Soviet Union; Aleksandr Yevdokimov on Resfeder; Vladimir Soroka on Obzor; Yuri Salnikov on Bagazh; Valentin Gorelkin on Rock	Great Britain; Richard Meade on Wayfarer II; Lucinda Prior-Palmer on Be Fair; Janet Hodgson on Larkspur; Debbie West on Baccarat
1975	(West Germany) Luhmühlen	Soviet Union; Pyotr Gornushko on Gusar; Viktor Kalinin on Araks; Vladimir Lanyugin on Reflex; Vladimir Tishkin on Flot	Great Britain; Lucinda Prior-Palmer on Be Fair; The Princess Anne on Goodwill; Sue Hatherly on Harley; Janet Hodgson on Larkspur	West Germany; Kurt Mergler on Vaibel; Herbert Blöcker on Albrant; Harry Klugmann on Veberod; Horst Karsten on Sioux
1977	(United Kingdom) Burghley	Great Britain; Lucinda Prior-Palmer on George; Jane Holderness-Roddam on Warrior; Christopher Collins on Smokey VI; Clarissa Strachan on Merry Sovereign	West Germany; Karl Schultz on Madrigal; Horst Karsten on Sioux; Hanna Huppelsberg-Zwöck on Akzent; Harry Klugmann on El Paso	Ireland; John Watson on Cambridge Blue; Eric Horgan on Pontoon; Patsy Maher on Ballagarry; Norman van de Vater on Blue Tom Tit
1979	(West Germany) Luhmühlen	Ireland; John Watson on Cambridge Blue; David Foster on Inis Mean; Alan Lillingston on Seven Up; Helen Cantillon on Wing Forward	Great Britain; Clarissa Strachan on Warrior; Lucinda Prior-Palmer on Killaire; Sue Hatherly on Monacle II; Christopher Collins on Gamble	France; Thierry Touzaint on Griboille C Armand Bigot on Gamin du Bois; Thierry Lacour on Sertorius; Edoaurd Decharme on Frisson A
1981	(Denmark) Horsens	Great Britain; Lizzie Purbrick on Peter the Great; Sue Benson on Gemma Jay; Richard Meade on Kilcashel; Virginia Holgate on Priceless	Switzerland; Josef Burger on Beaujour de Mars; Josef Räber on Benno II; Hansueli Schmutz on Oran; Ernst Baumann on Baron	Poland; Miroslaw Slusarczyk on Ekran; Krzysztof Rafalak on Djak; Jan Lipczynski on Elektron; Miroslaw Szlapka on Erywan
1983	(Switzerland) Frauenfeld	Sweden; Christian Persson on Joel; Göran Breisner on Ultimus xx Sven Ingvarsson on Doledo; Jeanette Ullsten on Noir	Great Britain; Lucinda Prior-Palmer on Regal Realm; Virginia Holgate on Night Cap; Lorna Clarke on Danville; Diana Clapham on Windjammer	France; Pascal Morvillers on Gulliver B Thierry Lacour on Hymen de la Cour; Marie-Christine Duroy on Harley; Patrick Marquebielle on Flamenco III
1985	(United Kingdom) Burghley	Great Britain; Virginia Holgate on Priceless; Lorna Clarke on Myross; Ian Stark on Oxford Blue; Lucinda Green on Regal Realm	France; Jean Teulere on Godelureau; Vincent Berthet on Kopino; Marie-Christine Duroy on Harley; Pascal Morvillers on Gulliver B	West Germany; Christoph Wagner on Phillip; Jürgen Blum on Frosty Bay; Ralf Ehrenbrink on Bettina; Claus Erhorn on Fair Lady
1987	(West Germany) Luhmühlen	Great Britain; Virginia Leng on Night Cap; Ian Stark on Sir Wattie; Rachel Hunt on Aloaf; Lucinda Green on Shannagh	West Germany; Wolfgang Mengers on Half Moon Bay; Ralf Ehrenbrink on Uncle Toss; Claus Erhorn on Justyn Thyme; Jürgen Blum on Frosty Bay	France; Thierry Lacour on Hymen de la Cour; Didier Seguret on Jovial E Vincent Berthet on Jet Crub; Pascal Morvillers on Jacquet
1989	(United Kingdom) Burghley	Great Britain; Rodney Powell on The Irishman II; Ian Stark on Glenburnie; Virginia Leng on Master Craftsman; Lorna Clarke-Sutherland on Fearliath Mor	Netherlands; Eddy Stibbe on Bristols Autumn Fantasy; Fiona van Tuyll on Just a Gamble; Mandy Stibbe-Jeakins on Bristols Autumn Bronze	Ireland; Melanie Duff on Rathlin Joe; Olivia Holohan on Rusticus; Eric Horgan on Homer; Joe McGowan on Private Deal
1991	(Republic of Ireland) Punchestown	Great Britain; Ian Stark on Glenburnie; Richard Walker on Jacana; Karen Straker on Get Smart; Mary Thomson on King William	Ireland; Sonya Duke on Bright Imp; Olivia Holohan on Buket; Jeremy Spring on Holy Smoke; Fiona Wentges on Oliver	France; Jean-Jacques Boisson on Oscar de la Loge; Didier Mayoux on Maryland II; Jean Teulere on Orvet de Bellaing; Didier Seguret on Newlot
1993	(Germany) Achselschwang	Sweden; Lars Christensson on One Way; Fredrik Bergendorff on Michaelmas Day; Erik Duvander on Right On Time; Anna Hermann on Mr Punch	France; Jean Teulere on Orvet de Bellai; Michel Bouquet on Newport; Didier Seguret on Newlot; Jean-Lou Bigot on Twist la Beige	Ireland; Susan Shortt on Menana; Sonya Rowe on Bright Imp; Sally Corscadden on Cageodore; Eric Smiley on Enterprise
1995	(Italy) Pratoni del Vivaro	Great Britain; Charlotte Bathe on The Cool Customer; Kristina Gifford on Midnight Blue; William Fox-Pitt on Cosmopolitan; Mary King on King William	France; Gilles Pons on Ramdame; Rodolphe Scherer on Urane de Pins; Didier Willefert on Seducteur Biolay; Jean-Lou Bigot on Twist la Beige	Ireland; Mark Barry on Collongues; Virginia McGrath on Yellow Earl; Eric Smiley on Enterprise; Lucy Thompson on Welton Romance
1997	(United Kingdom) Burghley	Great Britain; Christopher Bartle on Word Perfect II; Ian Stark on Arakai; Mary King on Rusty; William Fox-Pitt on King William	Sweden; Sivert Jonsson on Jumping Jet Pack; Magnus Österlund on Master Mind; Paula Törnqvist on Monaghan; Anna Hermann on Home Run II	France; Jean Teulere on Rodosto; Frédéric de Romblay on Rosendael; Marie-Christine Duroy on Summer Song; Jean-Lou Bigot on Twist la Beige
1999	(Germany) Luhmühlen	Great Britain; Kristina Gifford on The Gangster II; Jeanette Brakewell on Over To You; Ian Stark on Jaybee; Pippa Funnell on Supreme Rock	Germany; Peter Thomsen on Warren Gorse; Herbert Blöcker on Chicol; Nele Hagener on Little McMuffin; Bodo Battenberg on Sam the Man	Belgium; Virginie Caulier on Kiona; Kurt Heyndrickx on Archimedes; Carl Bouckaert on Welton Molecule; Constantin Van Rijckevorsel on Otis
2001	(France) Pau	Great Britain; Leslie Law on Shear H2O; Jeanette Brakewell on Over To You; William Fox-Pitt on Stunning; Pippa Funnell on Supreme Rock	France; Rodolphe Scherer on Quack; Denis Mesples on Vanpire; Frédéric de Romblay on Baba Au Rhum; Didier Courrèges on Debat D'Estruval	Italy; Fabio Fani Ciotti on Down Town Brown; Andrea Verdina on Donnizetti; Marco Biasia on Ecu; Fabio Magni on Cool'n
2003	(Republic of Ireland) Punchestown	Great Britain; Jeanette Brakewell on Over To You; William Fox-Pitt on Moon Man; Leslie Law on Shear l'Eau; Pippa Funnell on Walk On Star	France; Jean-Luc Force on Crocus Jacob; Jean Teulere on Hobby du Mée; Arnaud Boiteau on Expo du Moulin; Nicolas Touzaint on Galan de Sauvagère	Belgium; Karin Donckers on Gormley; Carl Bouckaert on Welton Molecule; Dolf Desmedt on Bold Action; Constantin Van Rijckevorsel on Withcote Nellie
2005	(United Kingdom) Blenheim	Great Britain; Zara Phillips on Toytown; William Fox-Pitt on Tamarillo; Jeanette Brakewell on Over To You; Leslie Law on Shear l'Eau	France; Arnaud Boiteau on Expo du Moulin; Didier Willefert on Escape Lane Mili; Gilles Viricel on Blakring Mili; Nicolas Touzaint on Hidalgo de l'Ile	Germany; Frank Ostholt on Air Jordan; Hinrich Romeike on Marius; Anna Warnecke on Twinkle Bee; Bettina Hoy on Ringwood Cockatoo
2007	(Italy) Pratoni del Vivaro	Great Britain; Oliver Townend on Flint Curtis; Daisy Dick on Spring Along; Zara Phillips on Toytown; Mary King on Call Again Cavalier	France; Arnaud Boiteau on Expo du Moulin; Didier Dhennin on Ismene du Temple; Eric Vigeanel on Coronado Prior; Nicolas Touzaint on Galan de Sauvagère	Italy; Susanna Bordone on Ava; Fabio Magni on Southern King V Roberto Rotatori on Irham de Vaiges; Vittoria Panizzon on Rock Model
2009	(France) Fontainebleau	Great Britain; Kristina Cook on Miners Frolic; William Fox-Pitt on Idalgo du Donjon; Nicola Wilson on Opposition Buzz; Oliver Townend on Flint Curtis	Italy; Roberto Rotatori on Irham de Vaiges; Juan Carlos Garcia on Iman du Golfe; Stefano Brecciaroli on Oroton; Susanna Bordone on Blue Moss	Belgium; Karin Donckers on Gazelle de la Brasserie; Joris Vanspringel on Bold Action; Virginie Caulier on Kilo; Constantin Van Rijckevorsel on Our Vintage
2011	(Germany) Luhmühlen	Germany; Michael Jung on Sam; Sandra Auffarth on Opgun Louvo; Ingrid Klimke on Butts Abraxxas; Andreas Dibowski on Fantasia	France; Donatien Schauly on Ocarina du Chanois; Nicolas Touzaint on Quirinal de la Bastide; Stanislas de Zuchowicz on Quirinal de la Bastide; Pascal Leroy on Minos de Petra	Great Britain; William Fox-Pitt on Cool Mountain; Piggy French on Jakata; Nicola Wilson on Opposition Buzz; Mary King on Imperial Cavalier
2013	(Sweden) Malmö	Germany; Michael Jung on Halunke; Ingrid Klimke on Escada; Dirk Schrade on Hop and Skip; Andreas Dibowski on Butts Avedon	Sweden; Niklas Lindbäck on Mister Pooh; Ludwig Svennerstål on Shamwari; Frida Andersen on Herta; Sara Algotsson-Ostholt on Reality	France; Nicolas Touzaint on Lesbos; Donatien Schauly on Séculaire; Karim Laghouag on Punch de l'Esques; Astier Nicolas on Piaf de b'Neville
2015	(United Kingdom) Blair Castle	Germany; Michael Jung on Takinou; Sandra Auffarth on Opgun Louvo; Ingrid Klimke on Hale Bob; Dirk Schrade on Hop and Skip	Great Britain; Kitty King on Persimmon; Pippa Funnell on Sandman; Nicola Wilson on One Two Many; William Fox-Pitt on Bay My Hero	France; Thibaut Vallette on Qing du Briot; Mathieu Lemoine on Bart L Thomas Carlile on Sirocco du Gers; Karim Laghouag on Entebbe
2017	(Poland) Strzegom	Great Britain; Kristina Cook on Billy the Red; Nicola Wilson on Bulana; Rosalind Canter on Allstar B Oliver Townend on Cooley SRS	Sweden; Sara Algotsson-Ostholt on Reality; Louise Svensson Jahde on Utah Sun; Niklas Lindbäck on Focus Filiocus; Ludvig Svennerstål on Paramount Importance	Italy; Pietro Roman on Barraduff; Pietro Sandei on Rubis de Prere; Vittoria Panizzon on Chequers Play the Game; Arianna Schivo on Quefira de l'Ormeau
2019	(Germany) Luhmühlen	Germany; Ingrid Klimke on Hale Bob; Michael Jung on Chipmunk; Andreas Dibowski on Corrida; Kai Rüder on Colani Sunrise	Great Britain; Oliver Townend on Cooley Master Class; Piggy French on Quarrycrest Echo; Pippa Funnell on Majas Hope; Kristina Cook on Billy the Red	Sweden; Ludvig Svennerstål on El Kazir; Louise Romeike on Waikiki; Malin Josefsson on Golden Midnight; Niklas Lindbäck on Focus Filiocus
2021	(Switzerland) Avenches	Great Britain; Nicola Wilson on Dublin; Piggy March on Brookfield Innocent; Kitty King on Vendredi Biats; Rosalind Canter on Allstar B	Germany; Michael Jung on Wild Wave; Ingrid Klimke on Hale Bob; Anna Siemer on Avondale; Andreas Dibowski on Corrida	Sweden; Sara Algotsson Ostholt on Chicuelo; Malin Josefsson on Golden Midnight; Malin Petersen on Charly Brown; Christoffer Forsberg on Hippo's Sapporo
2023	(France) Haras national du Pin	Great Britain; Laura Collett on London52; Yasmin Ingham on Banzai Du Loir; Kitty King on Vendredi Biats; Rosalind Canter on Lordships Gaffalo	Germany; Michael Jung on Fischerchipmunk Frh; Sandra Auffarth on Viamant Du Matz; Christoph Wahler on Carjatan S Malin Hansen-Hotopp on Carlitos Quidditch K	France; Nicolas Touzaint on Absolut Gold Hdc; Stephane Landois on Ride For Thais Chaman; Gaspard Maksud on Zaragoza; Karim Florent Laghouag on Triton Fontaine
2025	(United Kingdom) Blenheim	Germany; Libussa Lübbeke on Caramia 34; Malin Hansen-Hotopp on Carlitos Quidditch K Jérôme Robiné on Black Ice; Michael Jung on Fischerchipmunk FRH	Ireland; Padraig McCarthy on Pomp N Circumstance; Robbie Kearns on Chance Encounter; Aoife Clark on Full Monty de Lacense; Ian Cassells on Millridge Atlantis	France; Luc Chateau on Cocorico de l'Ebat; Sebastien Cavaillon on Elipso de la Vigne; Alexis Goury on Je'vall; Astier Nicolas on Alertamalib'or

== All-time medal table (1953–2021) ==
Rank	Nation	Gold	Silver	Bronze	Total
1	Great Britain	42	26	19	87
2	Germany	12	16	14	42
3	Soviet Union	4	5	1	10
4	France	3	9	10	22
5	Ireland	3	4	7	14
6	Sweden	2	5	6	13
7	Switzerland	2	2	1	5
8	Poland	1	0	1	2
9	Denmark	1	0	0	1
10	Italy	0	1	3	4
11	Netherlands	0	1	1	2
12	Belgium	0	0	3	3
13	Spain	0	0	1	1
Totals (13 entries)		70	69	67	206
