= Didier Courrèges =

French equestrian (born 1960)

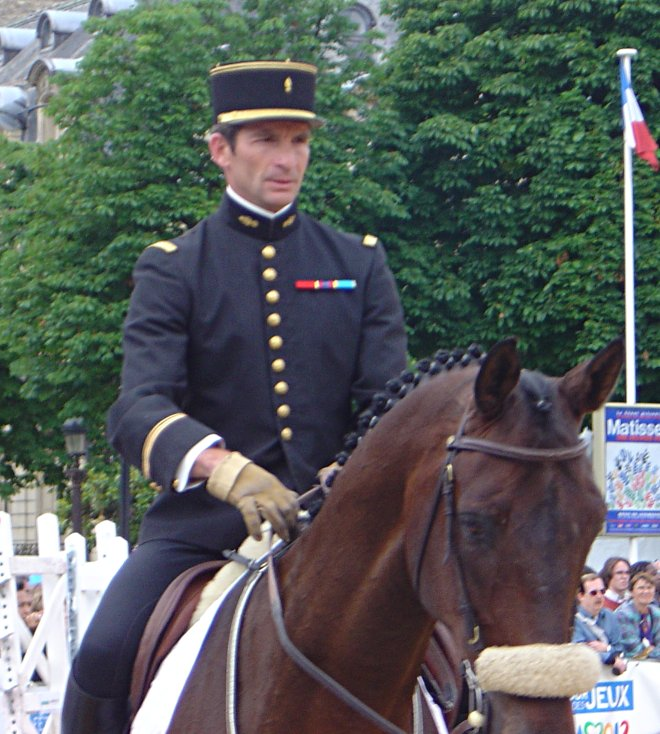

Medal record

Equestrian

Representing France

Olympic Games
Gold medal – first place	2004 Athens	Team eventing

World Championships
Silver medal – second place	2002 Jerez	Team eventing

European Championships
Silver medal – second place	2001 Pau	Team eventing

Didier Courrèges (born 15 June 1960 in Évreux, Eure) is a high-level horse rider. He is professor of equitation at the National School of Equitation in Saumur, France, and a member of its equestrian display team, the Cadre Noir.

He is a non-commissioned officer in the French Army and holds the rank of major. He was a member of the French team that won a gold medal in team eventing in the 2004 Summer Olympics.

== Honours ==
- Knight of the Legion of Honour
