= Sarah Bullimore =

British equestrian (born 1973)

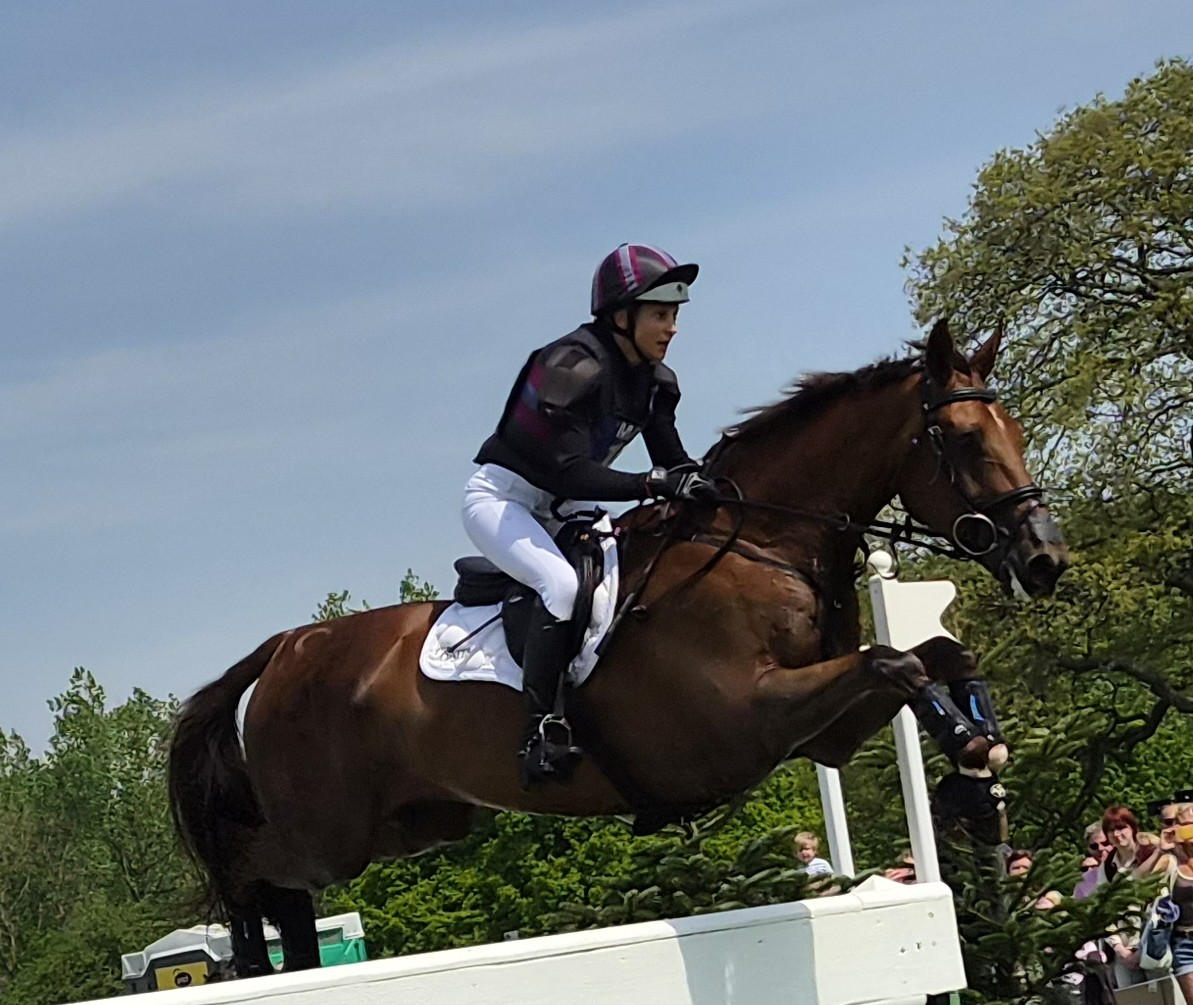
- Badminton Horse Trials 2026

Personal information
- Born: 18 May 1973 (age 53)

Sport
- Country: Great Britain
- Sport: Equestrian
Medal record
Representing Great Britain
Equestrian
European Championships
Bronze medal – third place	2021 Avenches	Individual

Sarah Bullimore (born 18 May 1973) is a British equestrian.

== Career ==
She was selected onto the UK Sport National Lottery-funded World Class Podium squad at the end of 2014. She made her senior championship debut as an individual at the European Eventing Championships at Blair Castle Horse Trials in 2015, riding Lilly Corinne.

She was second at Pau Horse Trials 2017 with Reve Du Rouet and they went on to finish fourth at Burghley Horse Trials in 2018 and 2019 and fifth at Luhmühlen Horse Trials in 2019.

She was a bronze medalist in the individual event at the 2021 European Eventing Championships in Switzerland riding Lilly Corinne's son, Corouet.

She came second at the 2022 Blenheim Horse Trials on Evita AP in the CCI4*-S competition for eight and nine-year-old horses. She was part of the British team which won the FEI Nations Cup event in Boekelo in October 2022.

== Personal life ==
She and husband Brett live in Keysoe in Bedfordshire.
