= Reuben Jones =

British equestrian (1932–1990)

Ben Jones
Medal record

Equestrian

Representing Great Britain

Olympic Games
Gold medal – first place	1968 Mexico City	Team eventing

European Championships
Gold medal – first place	1967 Punchestown	Team eventing
Gold medal – first place	1969 Haras-du-Pin	Team eventing
Bronze medal – third place	1965 Moscow	Team eventing

Reuben "Ben" Jones (born 19 October 1932 in Newport, Shropshire, England; died 3 January 1990 in Melton Mowbray, Leicestershire) was a British Olympic equestrian rider who competed in the 1964 Summer Olympics in Tokyo and the 1968 Summer Olympics in Mexico City.

== Equestrian career ==
Jones was part of the British team that travelled to Tokyo in 1964 to compete in team eventing. Eventing is an equestrian event which comprises dressage, cross-country and show jumping. Other team members were Michael Bullen, Richard Meade, and James Templar. The team was eliminated out of medal contention. Jones finished ninth on an individual basis riding a horse called The Poacher. He was the first non-commissioned officer to compete for Great Britain in the equestrian portion of the Olympic Games.

Jones and the team from Great Britain at the 1968 Summer Olympics won the gold medal in the team eventing equestrian event. Teammates for the 1968 win were Derek Allhusen, Jane Bullen, and Richard Meade. Jones finished fifth on an individual basis that year. Jones also won gold medals in 1967 and 1969 at the European Championships as part of the British team.

== Military career ==
Jones was an accomplished horseman; as a young man his ambition was to become a jockey, but he was too tall. He chose to join the army as a way to work with horses.

Jones was a sergeant of the King's Troop, Royal Horse Artillery, in charge of equitation. In 1968, he was posted to the Royal Army Veterinary Corps; after his commission he was transferred to the General Service Corps at Melton Mowbray. There he was in charge of training at the RAVC remount depot. After retirement, he died in 1990 aged 57 while training a young horse.

In Newport there is a residential street named "Ben Jones Avenue" after him.
