= John Watson (equestrian) =

Irish equestrian

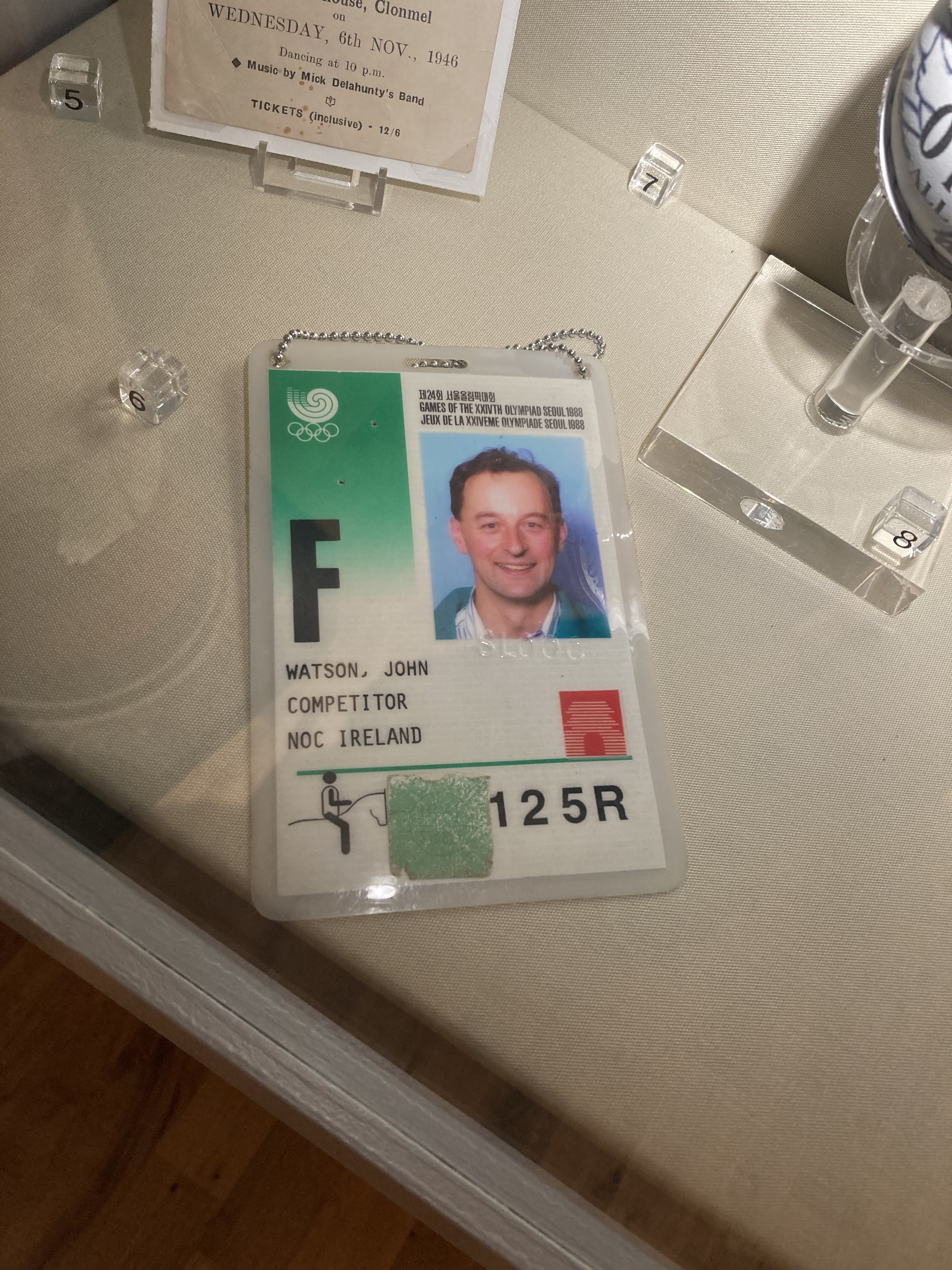
- ID issued to Watson at the Seoul Olympics (Tipperary Museum of Hidden History)

Personal information
- Nationality: Irish
- Born: 3 February 1952 (age 74) London, England

Sport
- Sport: Equestrian
Medal record
Equestrian
Representing Ireland
World Championships
| Silver medal – second place | 1978 Lexington | Individual eventing |
European Championships
| Gold medal – first place | 1979 Luhmühlen | Team eventing |
| Bronze medal – third place | 1977 Burghley | Team eventing |

John Watson (born 3 February 1952) is an Irish equestrian. He competed in the individual eventing at the 1988 Summer Olympics.
