= Jean Teulère =

French equestrian (born 1954)

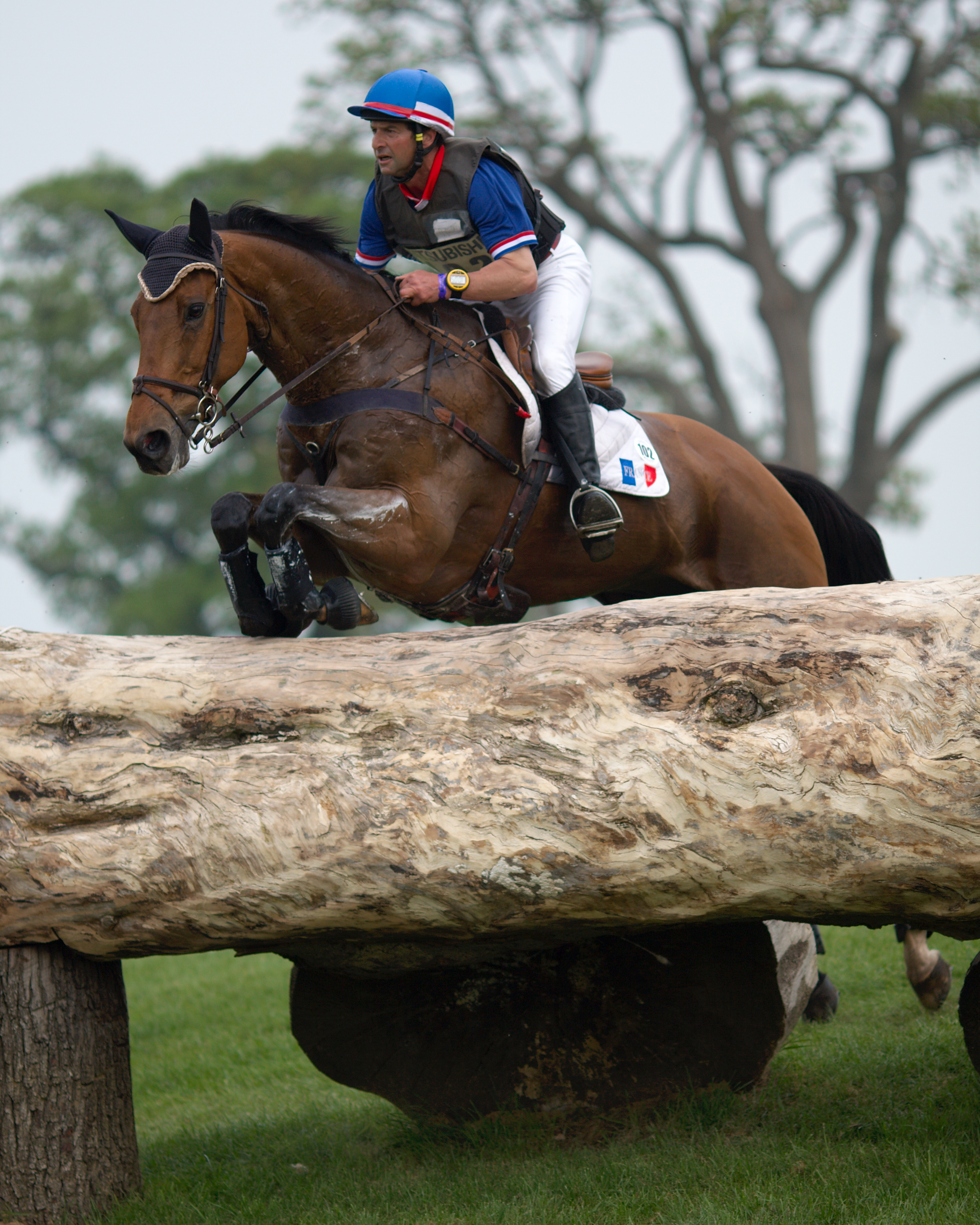
- Jean Teulère and Matelot Du Grand Val at the Quarry during the cross-country phase of Badminton Horse Trials 2011

Personal information
- Full name: Jean Teulère
- Nationality: France
- Discipline: Eventing
- Born: 27 February 1954 (age 71); Caudéran
Medal record
Equestrian
Representing France
Olympic Games
Gold medal – first place	2004 Athens	Team eventing
World Equestrian Games
Gold medal – first place	2002 Jerez	Individual eventing
Silver medal – second place	1994 The Hague	Team eventing
Silver medal – second place	2002 Jerez	Team eventing
European Championships
Silver medal – second place	1985 Burghley	Team eventing
Bronze medal – third place	1991 Punchestown	Team eventing
Silver medal – second place	1993 Achselschwang	Team eventing
Bronze medal – third place	1997 Burghley	Team eventing
Silver medal – second place	2003 Punchestown	Team eventing

Jean Teulère (born 27 February 1954) is a French equestrian and Olympic champion. He won a team gold medal in eventing at the 2004 Summer Olympics in Athens, and finished 4th in the individual contest. He was born in Caudéran.
