= Carl Bouckaert =

Belgian equestrian and businessman

Medal record

Equestrian

Representing Belgium

European Championships
Bronze medal – third place	1999 Luhmühlen	Team eventing
Bronze medal – third place	2003 Punchestown	Team eventing

Carl Bouckaert (born 19 April 1954) is a Belgian equestrian and businessman. At the 2012 Summer Olympics he competed in the Individual eventing. He also competed in the Belgian Olympic team during the Sydney Olympics in 2000.

A native of Belgium, Carl Bouckaert studied engineering at Louvain University. In 1977 he began working at Beaulieu Group of Companies in Belgium.

In 1978 Carl moved to the USA and co-founded Beaulieu of America in Dalton, Georgia. Under his leadership, this small rug weaving operation grew into what was once the world’s third largest (and largest privately held) carpet manufacturer. Beaulieu of America declared bankruptcy on July 17, 2017 and, after the company's reorganization efforts failed, Beaulieu of America's assets were acquired by Engineered Floors in a deal announced on September 20, 2017.

Bouckaert is also an avid horseman, who has attained world-class standing in the equestrian arena.

1998 A Belgian team member at the World Equestrian Games in Pratoni Del Vivaro, Italy. 2000 A Belgian team member at the Olympic Games in Sydney, Australia. 2006 A Belgian team member at the World Equestrian Games in Aachen, Germany. 2012 A Belgian team member at the Olympic Games in London, England.

He is also the owner of Bouckaert Farm, where TomorrowWorld was organised in 2013, which is Tomorrowland's (The world's biggest electronic dance festival) little sister. The farm was the shooting location for Tony Stark's lakehouse in the 2019 film, Avengers: Endgame. The 2018 film Black Panther was also shot there.
