= Sheila Willcox =

British eventer (1936-2017)

Sheila Mary Willcox
Personal information
- Born: 12 March 1936 Sutton Coldfield, Warwickshire
- Died: 9 June 2017 (aged 81)
- Spouse: John Waddington
- Relative: John Willcox (brother)
Medal record
Equestrian
Representing Great Britain
European Championships
Gold medal – first place	1957 Copenhagen	Individual eventing
Gold medal – first place	1957 Copenhagen	Team eventing
Silver medal – second place	1959 Harewood	Team eventing

Sheila Mary Willcox (12 March 1936 – 9 June 2017) was a British-born eventer who won several national and international three-day events, including the Badminton Horse Trials and the European Championships. She won Badminton three consecutive years (1957–1959), and was the first woman rider in the UK to achieve international success.

== Biography ==
Born on 12 March 1936 at Sutton Coldfield, Warwickshire to confectioner's agent Arthur Willcox (1891-1967) and Helen Patience (1905-1971), née Davies, she had a wealthy background. Her brother is the rugby union international John Willcox. Willcox began riding in childhood, and participated in Pony Club. She rode in her first three-day event with partner High and Mighty, an Arabian/pony cross, in 1955 at the young age of eighteen. Her first ride around Badminton occurred a year later, where she managed to capture second place. After a few more years Willcox won the event with High and Mighty in 1957, leading the competition start to finish. She won the Badminton title again with High and Mighty the next year, with a 22-point lead after dressage, widening to a 47-point lead by the end of the event.

Willcox also competed in the 1957 European Championships with High and Mighty, earning both team and individual gold medals. The partnerships also won a team gold at the 1959 European Championships. However, women were not allowed to ride in the Olympic Three-Day competition at this time, and so she was unable to participate. Her mount was sold to Ted Marsh, to be used by the British Team, although High and Mighty was, in the end, never selected.

Having married wealthy Lancashire cotton merchant John Waddington, Willcox (now Waddington) returned to Badminton in 1959 with her new, and inexperienced, mount Airs and Graces. She won the dressage, but had to go slow cross-country due to the ground conditions. However, a rail down in show jumping by fellow competitor David Somerset allowed her to clinch the win. To this day, she is the only rider to have won Badminton three years running.

Willcox also won Little Badminton in 1964, riding Glenamoy.

Willcox competed successfully for several years, winning eight major titles. However, a fall in 1971 at the Tidworth Horse Trials left her partially paralyzed, and she gave up eventing and focused on dressage. She went on to gain success in this equestrian sport as well, reaching the Grand Prix level on Son and Heir.

She died on 9 June 2017 at the age of 81.
