= Marc Büchler =

Swiss equestrian

Personal information
- Nationality: Swiss
- Born: 1929
- Died: 13 May 1980 (aged 50–51)

Sport
- Sport: Equestrian
Medal record
Equestrian
Representing Switzerland
European Championships
Silver medal – second place	1955 Windsor	Team eventing

Marc Büchler (1929 – 13 May 1980) was a Swiss equestrian. He competed in two events at the 1956 Summer Olympics.
