= Jeanette Brakewell =

British equestrian

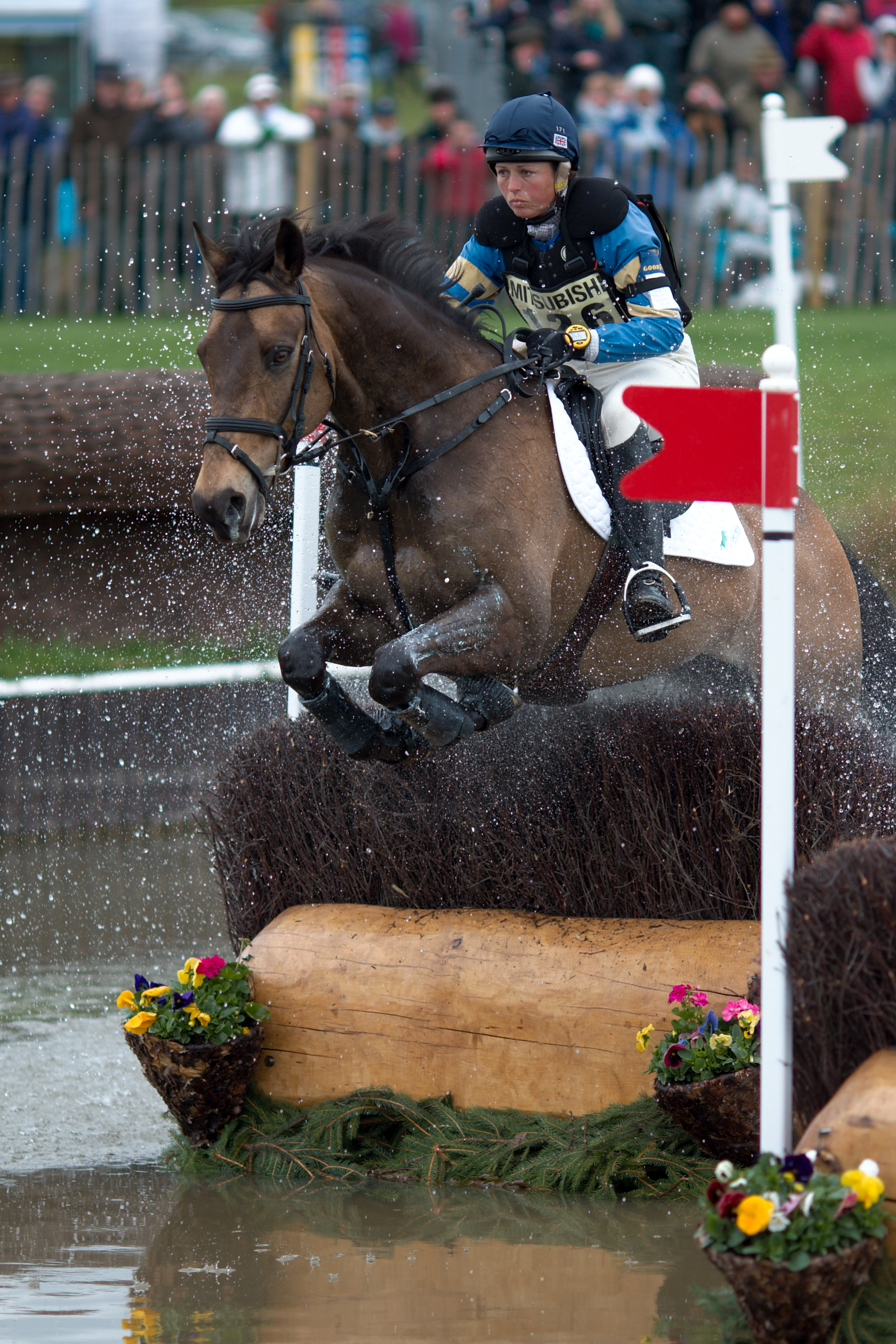
- Jeanette Brakewell and Major Buck at The Lake during the cross-country phase of Badminton Horse Trials 2010

Personal information
- Full name: Jeanette Brakewell
- Nationality: Great Britain
- Discipline: Eventing
- Born: February 4, 1974 (age 51)
Medal record
Equestrian
Representing Great Britain
Olympic Games
Silver medal – second place	2000 Sydney	Team eventing
Silver medal – second place	2004 Athens	Team eventing
World Championships
Silver medal – second place	2002 Jerez	Individual eventing
Bronze medal – third place	2002 Jerez	Team eventing
European Championships
Gold medal – first place	1999 Luhmuhlen	Team eventing
Gold medal – first place	2001 Pau	Team eventing
Gold medal – first place	2003 Punchestown	Team eventing
Gold medal – first place	2005 Blenheim	Team eventing

Jeanette Brakewell (born 4 February 1974) has been riding since the age of four and is a professional eventing rider.

She was a member of both the British silver medal team at the Athens Olympics of 2004, and the silver medal team in the same event at the Summer Olympics in Sydney 2000 riding her top horse, Over to You.

With Over to You, Brakewell was for several years a regular member of the British three-day eventing team. Arguably her best achievement to date was in winning the individual silver medal on this horse at the 2002 FEI World Equestrian Games in Jerez, Spain, 2002 and a team bronze medal at the same event. With this horse she was a team gold medallist on four occasions at the European Eventing Championships (1999, 2001, 2003, 2005).
