= Vincent Berthet =

French equestrian

Personal information
- Nationality: French
- Born: 9 September 1960 (age 65) Nérac, France

Sport
- Sport: Equestrian
Medal record
Equestrian
Representing France
World Championships
| Silver medal – second place | 1986 Gawler | Team eventing |
European Championships
| Silver medal – second place | 1985 Burghley | Team eventing |
| Bronze medal – third place | 1987 Luhmühlen | Team eventing |

Vincent Berthet (born 9 September 1960) is a French former equestrian. He competed in two events at the 1988 Summer Olympics.
