= Didier Seguret =

French equestrian

Personal information
- Nationality: French
- Born: 27 April 1956 (age 70) Toulouse, France

Sport
- Sport: Equestrian
Medal record
Equestrian
Representing France
European Championships
Silver medal – second place	1993 Achselschwang	Team eventing
Bronze medal – third place	1987 Luhmühlen	Team eventing
Bronze medal – third place	1991 Punchestown	Team eventing

Didier Seguret (born 27 April 1956) is a French equestrian. He competed in two events at the 1992 Summer Olympics.
