= Zara Tindall =

British equestrian (born 1981)

Zara Tindall MBE OLY
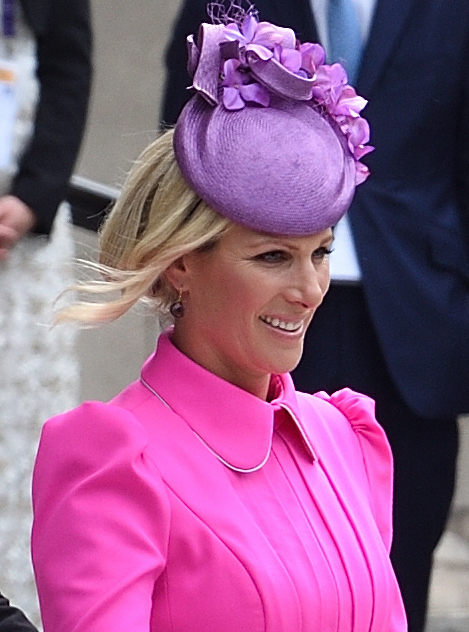
- Tindall in 2022
- Born: Zara Anne Elizabeth Phillips; 15 May 1981 (age 45); St Mary's Hospital, London, England
- Education: University of Exeter
- Spouse: Mike Tindall (m. 2011)
- Children: 3
- Parent(s): Anne, Princess Royal; Mark Phillips

Personal information
- Discipline: Eventing
Medal record
Representing Great Britain
Olympic Games
Silver medal – second place	2012 London	Team Eventing
World Championships
Gold medal – first place	2006 Aachen	Individual Eventing
Silver medal – second place	2006 Aachen	Team Eventing
Silver medal – second place	2014 Normandy	Team Eventing
European Championships
Gold medal – first place	2005 Blenheim	Individual Eventing
Gold medal – first place	2005 Blenheim	Team Eventing
Gold medal – first place	2007 Pratoni del Vivaro	Team Eventing
- Website: zaratindall.com

Zara Anne Elizabeth Tindall (née Phillips; born 15 May 1981) is a British equestrian, Olympian, and member of the British royal family. She is the daughter of Anne, Princess Royal, and Captain Mark Phillips, and the eldest niece of King Charles III. At birth she was sixth in the line of succession to the British throne during the reign of her maternal grandmother, Queen Elizabeth II, and as of 2026 is 23rd.

Tindall won the individual eventing world title at Aachen in 2006 and was later named BBC Sports Personality of the Year. She married former rugby union player Mike Tindall in 2011, and the couple have three children. The following year she carried the Olympic flame at Cheltenham Racecourse on her horse Toytown, and went on to win a team silver medal in eventing at the 2012 London Summer Olympics, presented to her by her mother.

== Early life and education ==
Zara Anne Elizabeth Phillips was born at 8:15 pm on 15 May 1981 at St Mary's Hospital, London. She was baptised on 27 July in the private chapel at Windsor Castle. Her first name was suggested by her uncle, Charles, the then Prince of Wales. Her godparents are her maternal uncle, Andrew Mountbatten-Windsor; the Countess of Lichfield; Helen, Lady Stewart, the wife of Sir Jackie Stewart; Andrew Parker Bowles; and Hugh Thomas. She has an elder brother, Peter, and two younger half-sisters, Felicity Wade (née Tonkin), from her father's affair with Heather Tonkin, and Stephanie Phillips, from his second marriage to Sandy Pflueger.

Phillips attended Beaudesert Park School in Stroud, Gloucestershire, and Port Regis School in Shaftesbury, Dorset, before following other members of the royal family in attending Gordonstoun School in Moray, Scotland. During her school years, she excelled in a range of sports and represented her schools in hockey, athletics, and gymnastics. She later studied at the University of Exeter and qualified as a physiotherapist.

== Equestrianism ==
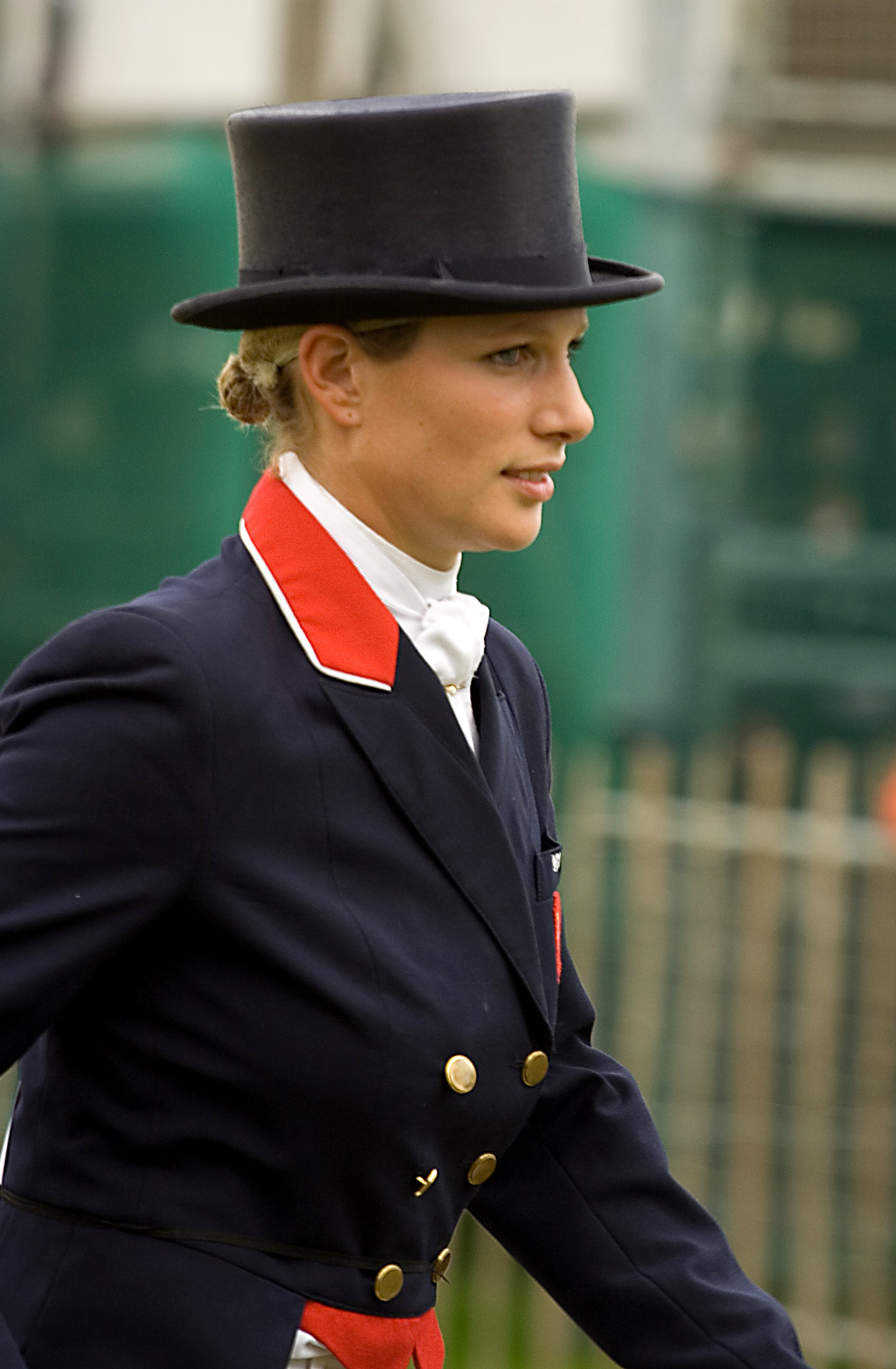
Tindall in 2007

After leaving university, Phillips began to pursue an equestrian career, following in the footsteps of her parents. In June 2003, she announced that she had secured a sponsorship agreement with Cantor Index, a spread betting company, to support the costs of her competitive career. Later that year, she finished as runner-up at the Burghley Horse Trials in her first four-star event. Phillips missed the 2004 Summer Olympics in Athens after her horse was injured during training.

Riding Toytown, Phillips won individual and team gold medals at the 2005 European Eventing Championship at Blenheim. She went on to win individual gold and team silver at the 2006 FEI World Equestrian Games in Aachen, Germany, becoming Eventing World Champion until 2010. Following her success in Germany, she was voted BBC Sports Personality of the Year, an award previously won by her mother in 1971. She was appointed Member of the Order of the British Empire (MBE) in the 2007 New Year Honours for services to equestrianism. At the 2007 European Eventing Championships in Italy, she won team gold but did not defend her individual title in the show‑jumping phase.

The British Olympic Association selected Phillips and Toytown for the 2008 Olympic Games in Hong Kong; however, Toytown sustained an injury during training and she withdrew from the team. On 25 October 2008, Phillips fell from her horse, Tsunami II, at the 15th fence of a cross‑country event in Pau, France, breaking her right collarbone. Tsunami II broke her neck after tipping over a hedge and was put down. In July 2010, Musto launched a range of equestrian clothing designed by Phillips, named ZP176 after her team number when she first represented Great Britain.

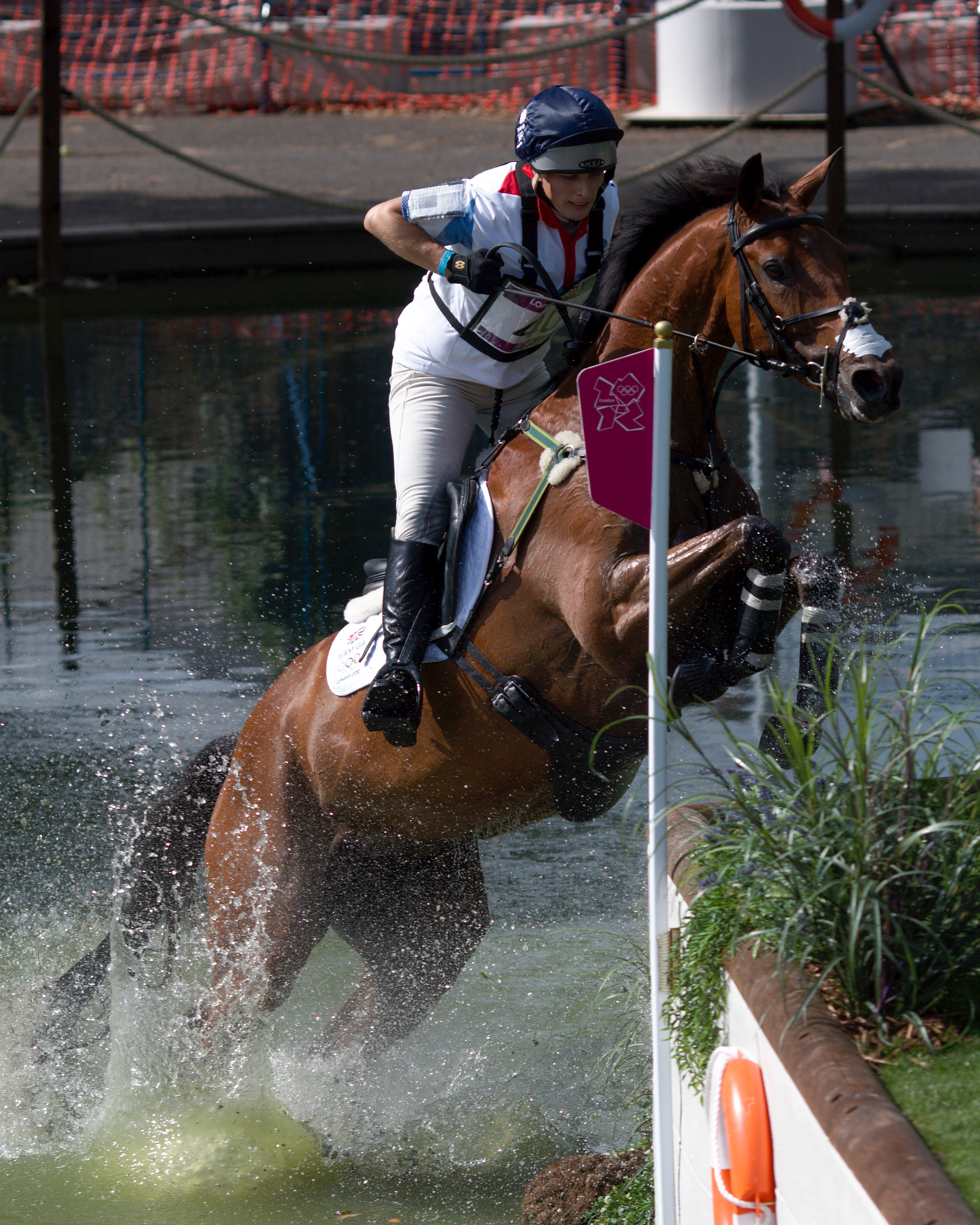
Tindall competing at the 2012 Summer Olympics in London

Phillips competed at the 2012 London Olympic Games on High Kingdom, winning silver in the team event. She finished second at the 2013 Luhmühlen Horse Trials on High Kingdom, and at the 2014 World Equestrian Games she was part of the British team that won team silver. She stopped using her maiden name in March 2016 and competed as Zara Tindall for the first time during her unsuccessful attempt to qualify for the 2016 Rio Olympic Games. In 2017, Tindall finished third at the Kentucky Three-Day Event on High Kingdom, who retired from competition in 2018. In January 2020, she became a non‑executive director of Cheltenham Racecourse. In August 2020, she was selected for her first appearance on the British team at the FEI Nations Cup in Le Pin au Haras, France. In October 2021, Tindall competed at the Maryland 5 Star at Fair Hill, finishing 11th on Class Affair. In May 2022, she won the advanced class at the Chatsworth Horse Trials, again riding Class Affair. In August 2026, Tindall won the 2026 British Open eventing championship at Hartpury, riding Class Affair to victory in the CCI4*-S against 73 competitors.

== Charity work ==
Tindall frequently supports and attends events for a range of charitable causes, particularly those connected with spinal injuries, equestrianism, and children's welfare. In 2005, she auctioned an evening gown worn at the London premiere of the film Seabiscuit to raise funds for tsunami relief. She later undertook a visit to New Zealand in her role as patron of The Catwalk Trust. From 1998 to 2005, she served as president of Club 16–24, an organisation that encourages young people to take an interest in horse racing. She is associated with Inspire, a Salisbury‑based medical research charity that supports people with spinal cord injuries, and is patron of Lucy Air Ambulance for Children, the UK's first dedicated air transfer service for critically ill infants and children.

Tindall has appeared at events for The Caudwell Charitable Trust, which supports children with special needs, disabilities, and serious illnesses. In 2006, she took part in a charity day for Cantor Index, 658 of whose employees were killed in the September 11 attacks. The following year, she became patron of the Mark Davies Injured Riders Fund. For Sport Relief 2008, she posed for a portrait by the artist Jack Vettriano. In 2009, she attended a celebrity poker tournament in Monaco in aid of Darfur, Sudan, and in October 2010 she attended a similar event in London in aid of Cancer Research UK, of which she is patron. In 2011, she auctioned another evening gown in aid of the Christchurch earthquake appeal, raising £22,000. In 2013, she visited Stroud Maternity Ward to mark its 60th anniversary, and in 2014 she lent her support to the #bringbackourgirls campaign. In April 2020, Tindall participated in the Equestrian Relief initiative to help provide additional personal protective equipment for National Health Service workers.

== Other activities ==
In June 2015, Tindall launched an equestrian-themed jewellery collection, named "Zara Phillips Collection", in collaboration with Australian designer John Calleija. On 17 September 2022, during the period of official mourning for Queen Elizabeth II, Tindall joined her brother and six cousins to mount a 15-minute vigil around the coffin of the Queen, as it lay in state at Westminster Hall. On 19 September, with her husband Mike and daughter Mia, she joined other family members at the state funeral.

== Personal life ==
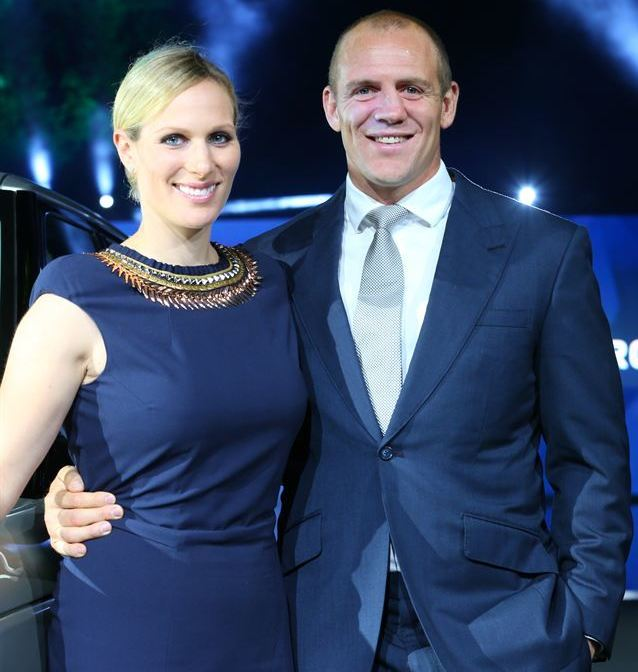
Tindall with her husband in 2012

Phillips met rugby union player Mike Tindall, who was then playing for the England national team, during the squad's Rugby World Cup-winning campaign in Australia in 2003. The couple became engaged in 2010. As required at the time by the Royal Marriages Act 1772, the Queen gave her consent to the marriage at a meeting of the Privy Council on 10 May 2011. A celebration was held on the royal yacht Britannia prior to the wedding.

They married on 30 July 2011 at the Canongate Kirk in Edinburgh, Scotland, with around 400 guests in attendance. Her off-the-rack ivory silk dress, designed by Stewart Parvin, featured "a chevron-pleated bodice, a dropped waist, and a 'cathedral-length' train". The Meander Tiara was lent to her to secure the veil. A reception followed at the Palace of Holyroodhouse.

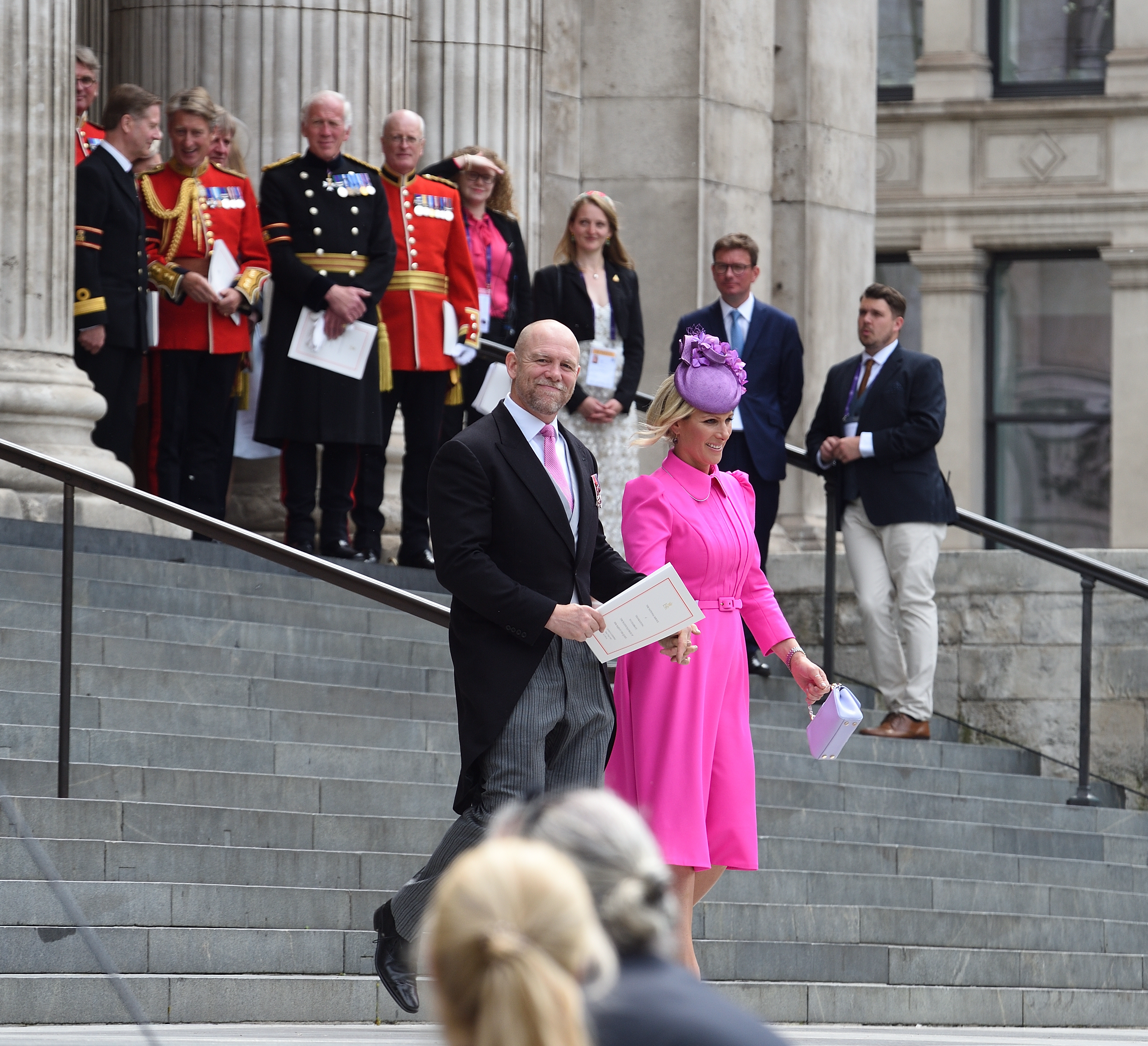
Tindall, and her husband Mike, at the National Service of Thanksgiving for the Platinum Jubilee of Elizabeth II in 2022

The Tindalls lived in Cheltenham, Gloucestershire, before moving to Aston Farm, a seven-bedroom property adjoining the Princess Royal's Gatcombe Park estate. Their first child, Mia Grace, was born on 17 January 2014 at Gloucestershire Royal Hospital and was 16th, later 24th, in the line of succession. Tindall's next two pregnancies ended in miscarriage. A second daughter, Lena Elizabeth, was born on 18 June 2018 at Stroud Maternity Hospital and was 19th, later 25th, in the line of succession. Their third child, a son, Lucas Philip, was born on 21 March 2021 at their home and was 22nd, later 26th, in the line of succession. Tindall is a godmother to Prince George of Wales, the son of her cousin, William, Prince of Wales.

In December 2000, she was involved in a serious car crash near Bourton-on-the-Water, escaping injury after overturning her Land Rover. In January 2020, Tindall received a six‑month driving ban after accumulating 12 points on her licence, and was fined a victim surcharge of £151.

== Arms ==
Coat of arms of Zara Tindall
Notes Tindall bears her father's arms on a lozenge. She is also entitled to use the coronet of a female-line grandchild of the sovereign. Coronet Tindall is entitled to use the coronet of a female-line grandchild of the sovereign. Escutcheon Per chevron Azure and Or, in chief a Horse courant Argent, and in base a Sprig of forget-me-not Flowers, slipped and leaved Proper Orders Member of the Most Excellent Order of the British Empire

== Honours ==
- 30 December 2006: Member of the Most Excellent Order of the British Empire (MBE)

Zara Tindall Born: 15 May 1981
Lines of succession
Preceded by Isla Phillips	Line of succession to the British throne 23rd in line	Succeeded by Mia Tindall
Orders of precedence in the United Kingdom
Preceded by Lady Louise Mountbatten-Windsor	Ladies; Zara Tindall	Succeeded by The Duchess of Gloucester
Awards
Preceded by Andrew Flintoff	BBC Sports Personality of the Year; 2006	Succeeded by Joe Calzaghe
