= Leslie Law =

British equestrian

Leslie Law MBE
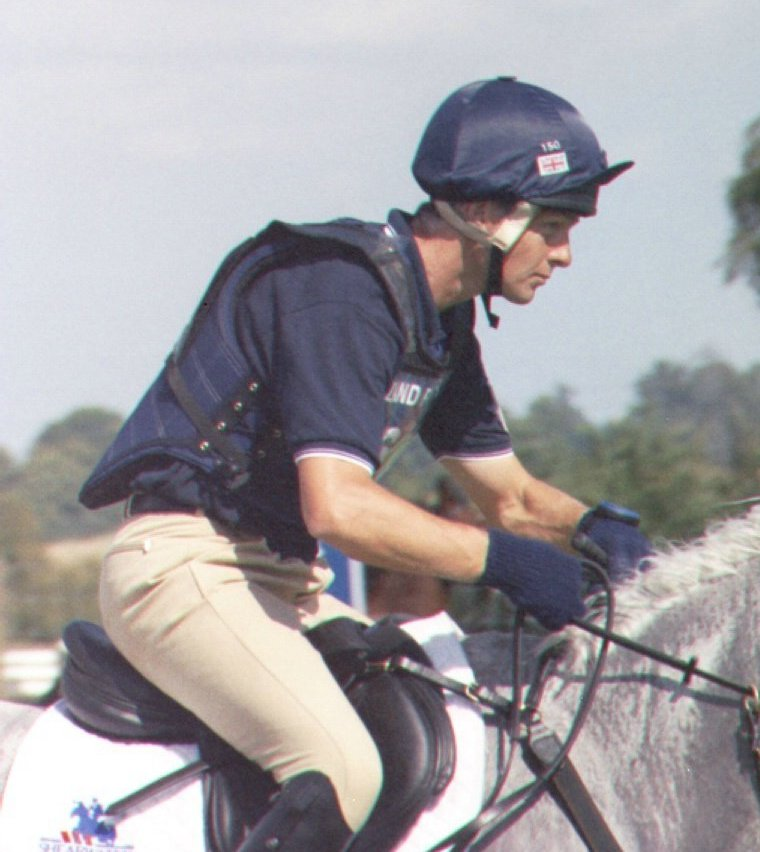
- Leslie Law riding Shear H2O (2004 Burghley Horse Trials)

Personal information
- Born: 5 May 1965 (age 61) Hereford, England
Medal record
Equestrian
Representing Great Britain
Olympic Games
Gold medal – first place	2004 Athens	Individual eventing
Silver medal – second place	2000 Sydney	Team eventing
Silver medal – second place	2004 Athens	Team eventing
World Championships
Bronze medal – third place	2002 Jerez	Team eventing
European Championships
Gold medal – first place	2001 Pau	Team eventing
Gold medal – first place	2003 Punchestown	Team eventing
Gold medal – first place	2005 Blenheim	Team eventing

Leslie Law MBE (born 5 May 1965) is a British eventer, who won the individual gold medal in the 2004 Summer Olympic Games. He started riding at age 10, competing with his brother, and participated in his first accredited event in 1982. He attended Lady Hawkins' School, where his passion for riding developed further. By 1989, he was a widely respected competitor, and that year placed 8th at the Badminton Horse Trials. After a period of consolidation, by the late 1990s he was counted amongst the sport's elite, placing in the top ten at Badminton, Burghley and the British Championship on a number of occasions.

== Biography ==
Born in Hereford, Law began in 1997 to compete on the brothers Shear H2O and Shear L'eau, a pair of Irish Sport Horse greys that made him immediately recognisable on the cross-country course. On the former, he won at Bramham in 1999, came second and third at Badminton in 2000 and 2002, and was a member of the British team that won silver at the 2000 Olympic Games and bronze at the 2002 World Equestrian Games. On Shear L'eau, he won team gold at the European Championship.

Their greatest success, however, was at the 2004 Olympics. Tenth after the dressage section, an excellent cross country still left him out of the medals, an inspired clear round in the show jumping saw him awarded the silver medal. However, amid much controversy the result was appealed, as video evidence showed that the gold medalist, German rider Bettina Hoy, had crossed the start line twice, and thus incurred twelve penalty points. By the time the Court of Arbitration for Sport ruled against Hoy, promoting Law to the gold, he had returned to England and heard the news that he was Olympic Champion while competing in the Solihull Horse Trials.

He was appointed Member of the Order of the British Empire in the 2005 New Year Honours List for services to Equestrian Sport.
