= Derek Allhusen =

British equestrian (1914–2000)

Medal record

Equestrian

Representing Great Britain

Olympic Games
Gold medal – first place	1968 Mexico City	Team eventing
Silver medal – second place	1968 Mexico City	Individual eventing

European Championships
Gold medal – first place	1957 Copenhagen	Team eventing
Gold medal – first place	1967 Punchestown	Team eventing
Gold medal – first place	1969 Haras-du-Pin	Team eventing
Silver medal – second place	1959 Harewood	Team eventing
Bronze medal – third place	1959 Harewood	Individual eventing
Bronze medal – third place	1965 Moscow	Team eventing
Bronze medal – third place	1967 Punchestown	Individual eventing

Major Derek Swithin Allhusen, CVO (9 January 1914 – 24 April 2000) was an English equestrian who was a 54-year-old grandfather when he rode Lochinvar to team gold and individual silver medals at the 1968 Summer Olympics in Mexico.

Derek Swithin Allhusen was born in London and educated at Eton and Trinity College, Cambridge. In 1937 he married The Hon Claudia Betterton. He served throughout the Second World War with 9th Queen's Royal Lancers, and the 24th Lancers (December 1940-September 1943) being awarded the American Silver Star in 1944 with the 9th Lancers.

On returning from Germany he brought back two horses with him and settled in Claxton, Norfolk. He rode one of the horses, Laura when representing Britain in the pentathlon at the 1948 Winter Olympic Games. He eventually took up eventing in 1955, riding Laura's daughter Laurien on two European Championship teams, winning a team gold medal in 1957, then team silver and individual bronze in 1959. In 1961 he bought Irish-bred Lochinvar and rode her in two winning European Championship teams (in 1967 and 1969) as well as the gold and silver at the 1968 Summer Olympics. He was offered appointment as an MBE for his achievements but declined it; feeling his team-mates Richard Meade, Jane Bullen and Reuben Jones also deserved recognition.

On his retirement from the sport he continued as a breeder and Laurien's son Laurieston was ridden to team and individual Olympic gold medals in 1972 Games in Munich, with Richard Meade in the saddle. Allhusen was president of the British Horse Society from 1986 to 1988.

Allhusen was appointed to be one of Her Majesty's Body Guard of the Honourable Corps of Gentlemen at Arms in 1963, he was appointed Standard Bearer from 1981 to 1984. He was appointed to be a Commander of the Royal Victorian Order in 1983.

In November 1955, 1956 and 1957 he was nominated as a High Sheriff of Norfolk (and appointed in March 1958) in the Queen's Bench Division of the High Court of Justice.
