= Sara Algotsson Ostholt =

Swedish equestrian

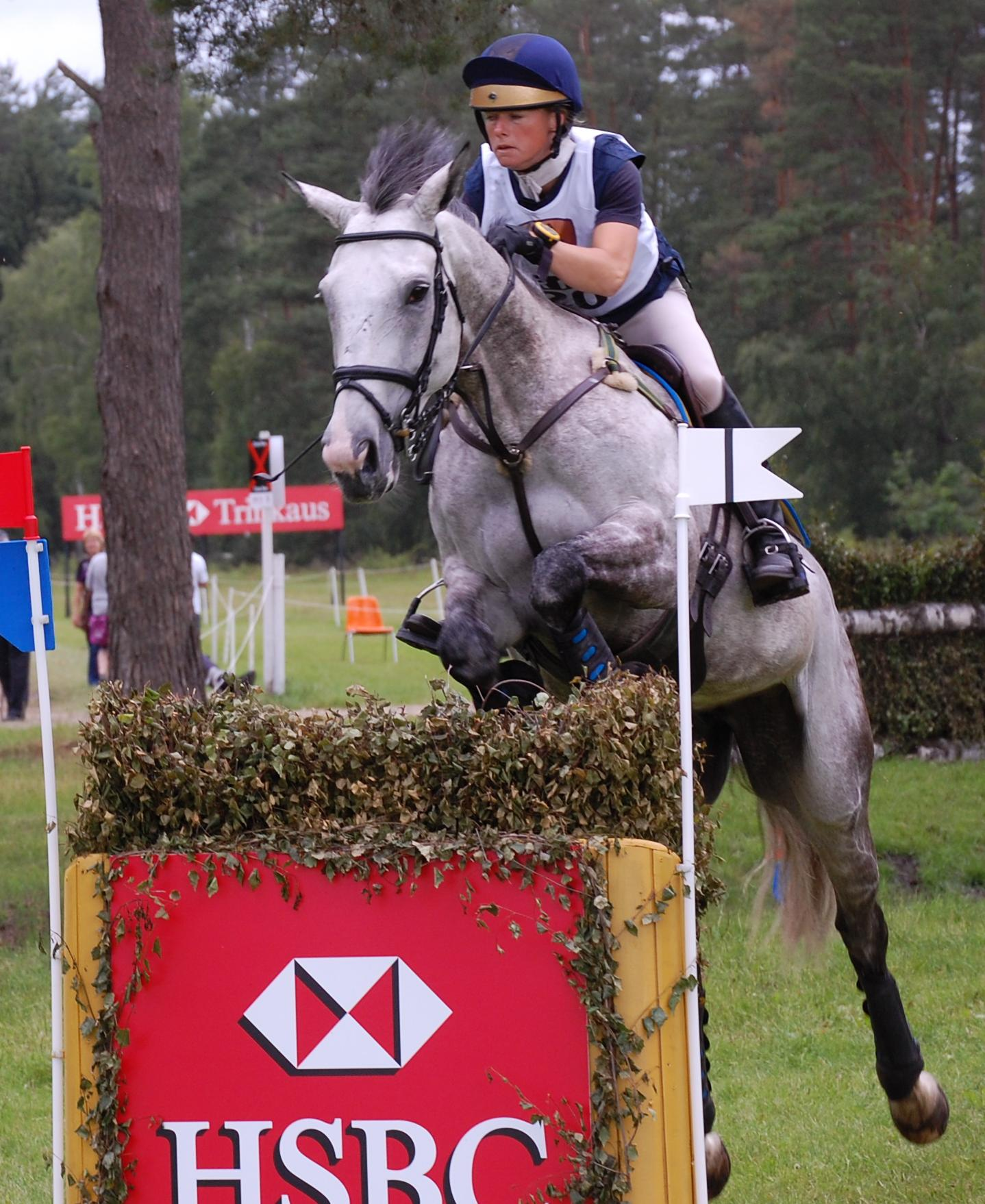

Personal information
- Born: 1974 (age 51–52) Rockneby
Medal record
Representing Sweden
Equestrian
Olympic Games
Silver medal – second place	2012 London	Individual eventing
European Championships
Silver medal – second place	2013 Malmo	Team eventing
Silver medal – second place	2017 Strzegom	Team eventing
Bronze medal – third place	2021 Avenches	Team eventing

Sara Anneli Algotsson Ostholt (born 8 December 1974 in Rockneby, Sweden) is a Swedish equestrian. At the 2012 Summer Olympics she competed in both the team and the individual eventing. Algotsson won a silver medal in the individual eventing.

She is the younger sister of fellow rider Linda Algotsson. She is married to German equestrian Frank Ostholt.

She lost one of her lead horses in a vehicle fire while on the way to a competition. The probable cause of the fire was stated as a mechanical issue.

== Notable Horses ==
- Robin Des Bois - 1989 Bay Swedish Warmblood Gelding (Robin Z x Prince Pair)
  - 1999 European Championships - Team Fifth Place
  - 2003 FEI World Cup Final - Seventh Place
  - 2004 FEI World Cup Final - 13th Place
  - 2004 Athens Olympics - Team Ninth Place, Individual 34th Place
- Sollozzo - 2002 Chestnut Swedish Warmblood Gelding (Cortus x Ceylon)
  - 2008 FEI Eventing Young Horse World Championships - Fourth Place
- Wega - 2001 Gray Swedish Warmblood Mare (Irco Mena x Labrador 588)
  - 2008 FEI Eventing Young Horse World Championships - Ninth Place
  - 2011 European Championships - Team Fourth Place, Individual 12th Place
  - 2012 London Olympics - Team Fourth Place, Individual Silver Medal
- Reality 39 - 2004 Dark Bay Hanoverian Mare (Rabino x Prince Thatch XX)
  - 2013 European Championships - Team Silver Medal, Individual 14th Place
  - 2015 European Championships - Team Fifth Place, Individual 23rd Place
  - 2016 Rio Olympics - Team 11th Place, Individual 36th Place
  - 2017 European Championships - Team Silver Medal, Individual Ninth Place
- Coughar - 2010 Gray Swedish Warmblood Gelding (Camaro M x Cortez)
  - 2016 FEI Eventing Young Horse Championships - 19th Place

Olympic Games
Preceded by Therese Alshammar	Flagbearer for Sweden (with Max Salminen); Tokyo 2020	Succeeded by Incumbent
