= Jane Holderness-Roddam =

British equestrian

Medal record

Equestrian

Representing United Kingdom

Olympic Games
Gold medal – first place	1968 Mexico City	Team eventing

European Championships
Gold medal – first place	1977 Burghley	Team eventing

Jane Mary Elizabeth Holderness-Roddam CVO CBE (née Bullen; born 1 July 1948, Charmouth, Dorset) is a British event rider, winning Badminton Horse Trials in 1968 (on Our Nobby) and 1978 (on Warrior). She also won Burghley Horse Trials in 1976 (on 'Warrior'), and competed in the 1968 Summer Olympics in Mexico City, winning team gold for Great Britain, alongside Richard Meade, Reuben Jones and Derek Allhusen.

Holderness-Roddam owned a stud in North Wiltshire jointly with her late husband and lives on the estate

Holderness-Roddam was appointed Lieutenant of the Royal Victorian Order (LVO) in the 1999 New Year Honours, Commander of the Order of the British Empire (CBE) in the 2004 Birthday Honours, and Commander of the Royal Victorian Order (CVO) in the 2020 Birthday Honours. She was presented with the Queen's Award for Equestrianism in 2009.
