= Arnaud Boiteau =

French equestrian (born 1973)

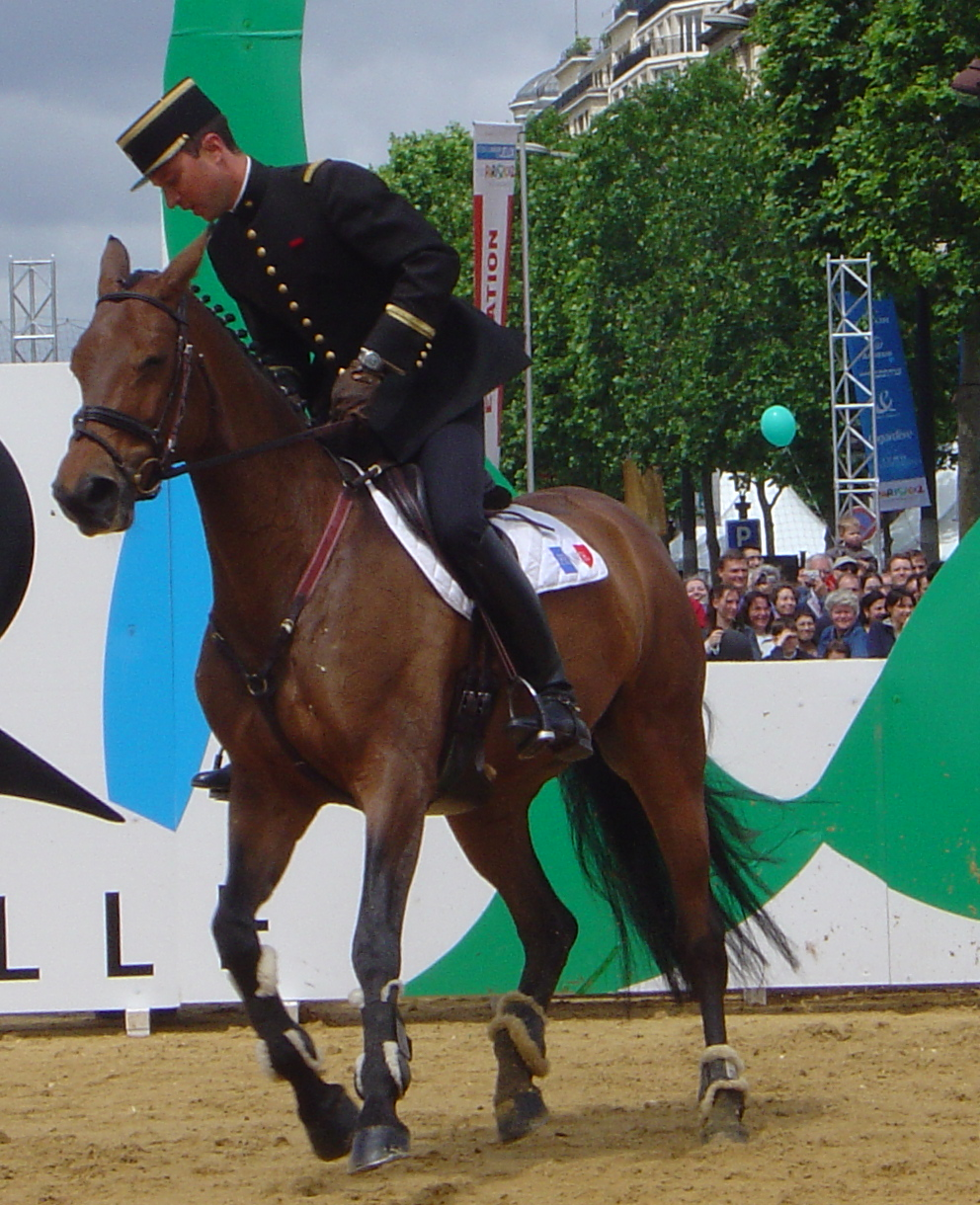

Personal information
- Nationality: French
- Born: 7 November 1973 (age 52) Angers

Sport
- Sport: Equestrian
Medal record
Equestrian
Representing France
Olympic Games
Gold medal – first place	2004 Athens	Team eventing
European Championships
Silver medal – second place	2003 Punchestown	Team eventing
Silver medal – second place	2005 Blenheim	Team eventing
Silver medal – second place	2007 Pratoni del Vivaro	Team eventing

Arnaud Boiteau (born 7 November 1973, in Angers) is a French equestrian and Olympic champion. He won a team gold medal in eventing at the 2004 Summer Olympics in Athens.
