= Jean-Lou Bigot =

French equestrian

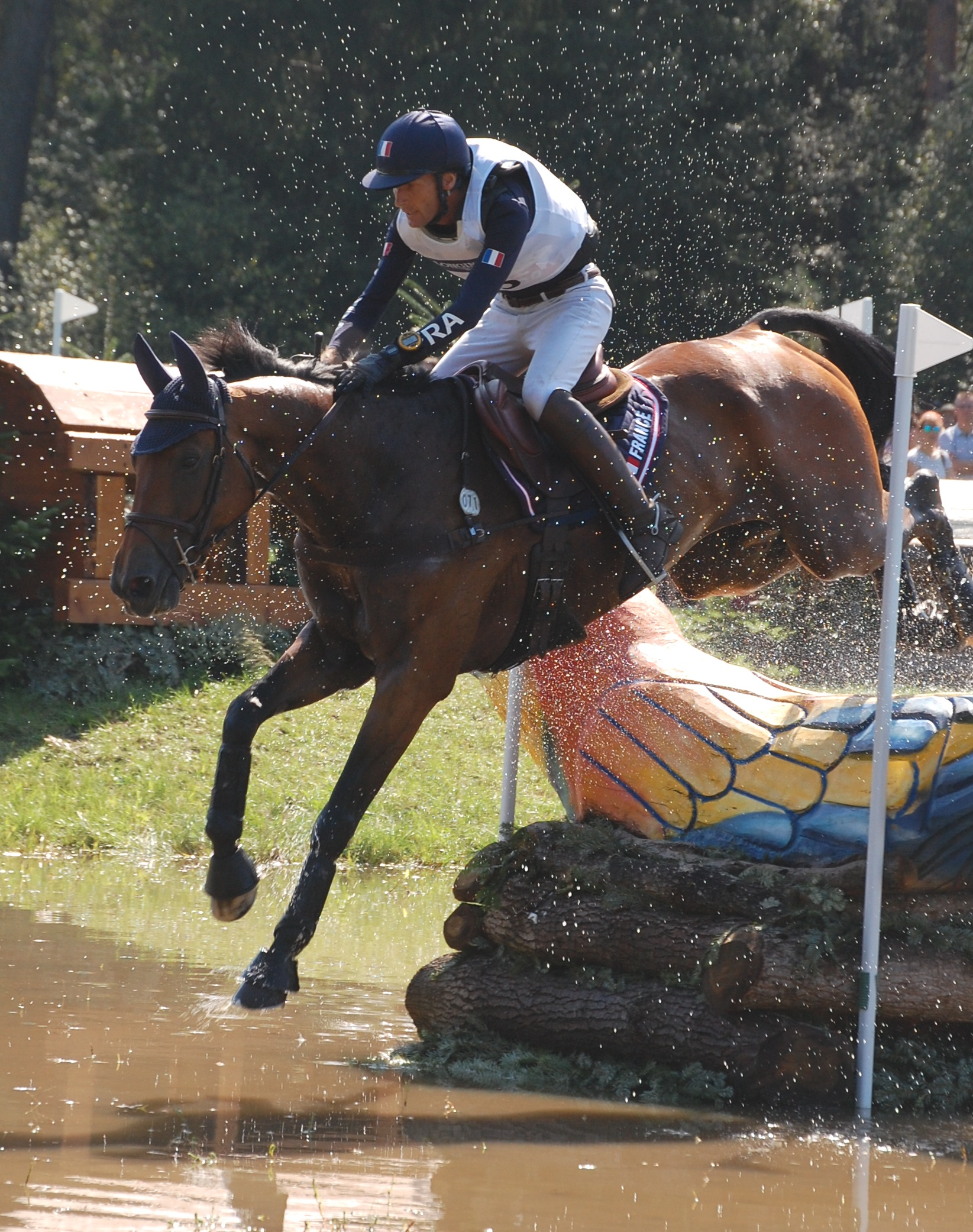
- Jean-Lou Bigot (2019)

Personal information
- Nationality: French
- Born: 22 April 1966 (age 60) Longué-Jumelles, France

Sport
- Sport: Equestrian
Medal record
Equestrian
Representing France
World Championships
Silver medal – second place	1994 The Hague	Team eventing
Silver medal – second place	1998 Rome	Team eventing
European Championships
Gold medal – first place	1993 Achselschwang	Individual eventing
Silver medal – second place	1993 Achselschwang	Team eventing
Silver medal – second place	1995 Pratoni del Vivaro	Team eventing
Bronze medal – third place	1997 Burghley	Team eventing

Jean-Lou Bigot (born 22 April 1966) is a French equestrian. He competed in two events at the 2000 Summer Olympics.
