= John Willcox =

British Lions & England international rugby union player

- Born: John Graham Willcox; 16 February 1937 (age 89) Sutton Coldfield, Warwickshire, England
- Notable relative: Sheila Willcox (sister)

Rugby union career
- Position: Fullback
International career
Years	Team	Apps	(Points)
1961-1964	England	16	(17)
1962	British Lions	3	(5)

John Graham Willcox (born 16 February 1937 in Sutton Coldfield) is a rugby union international who represented England from 1961 to 1964, and the British Lions in 1962.

== Early life ==
John Willcox was born on 16 February 1937 at Sutton Coldfield to confectioner's agent Arthur Willcox (1891-1967) and Helen Patience (1905-1971), née Davies; he had a wealthy upbringing. His sister was the eventer Sheila Willcox. He played rugby as a full-back.

== Rugby union career ==
His club team was Harlequins.

Willcox made his international debut on 11 February 1961 at Lansdowne Road in the Ireland vs England match. Of the 19 matches he played for his national side he was on the winning side on 6 occasions. He played his final match for England on 21 March 1964 at Murrayfield in the Scotland vs England match.

He took part in the 1962 British Lions tour to South Africa, playing in three test matches.

After he retired from playing, he was for many years the rugby coach and a teacher at Ampleforth College.
