= Blenheim Park =

UK Site of Special Scientific Interest

Coordinates: 51.836°N 1.370°W

- Site of Special Scientific Interest
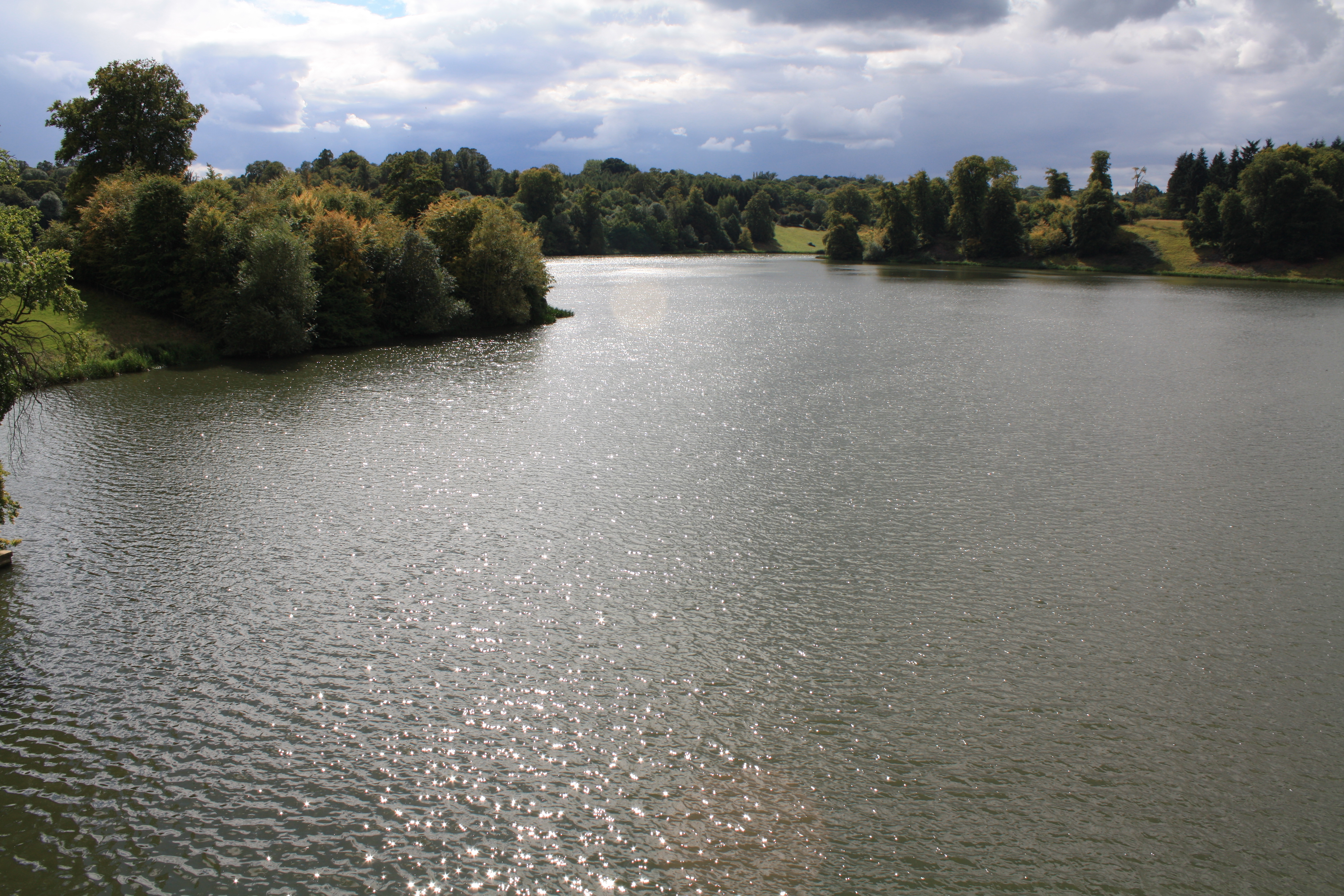
- Location of Blenheim Park.
- Area of search: Oxfordshire
- Grid reference: SP 435 155
- Interest: Biological
- Area: 224.3 hectares (554 acres)
- Notification date: 1986
- Location map: Magic Map

Blenheim Park is a 224.3-hectare (554-acre) biological Site of Special Scientific Interest in the civil parish of Blenheim, in the West Oxfordshire district, in Oxfordshire, England, on the outskirts of Woodstock. It occupies most of the grounds of Blenheim Palace.

The park was once an Anglo-Saxon chase and then a twelfth-century deer park. It now has some of the best areas of pasture and oak woodland in the country. The large lakes were created in the eighteenth century, and they are regionally important for breeding and wintering birds. Invertebrates include three rare beetles which are included in the British Red Data Book of Invertebrates, Rhizophagus oblongicollis, Plectophloeus nitidus and Aeletesatomarius.
