= Hansueli Schmutz =

Swiss equestrian

Personal information
- Nationality: Swiss
- Born: 26 July 1950 (age 75) Biel-Benken, Switzerland

Sport
- Sport: Equestrian
Medal record
Equestrian
Representing Switzerland
European Championships
Gold medal – first place	1981 Horsens	Individual eventing
Silver medal – second place	1981 Horsens	Team eventing

Hansueli Schmutz (born 26 July 1950) is a Swiss former equestrian. He competed in the individual eventing at the 1984 Summer Olympics.
