= Pascal Morvillers =

French equestrian

Personal information
- Nationality: French
- Born: 24 February 1956 (age 70) Moreuil, France

Sport
- Sport: Equestrian
Medal record
Equestrian
Representing France
European Championships
Silver medal – second place	1985 Burghley	Team eventing
Bronze medal – third place	1983 Frauenfeld	Team eventing
Bronze medal – third place	1987 Luhmühlen	Team eventing

Pascal Morvillers (born 24 February 1956) is a French equestrian. He competed at the 1984 Summer Olympics and the 1988 Summer Olympics.
