= Linda Algotsson =

Swedish eventing rider

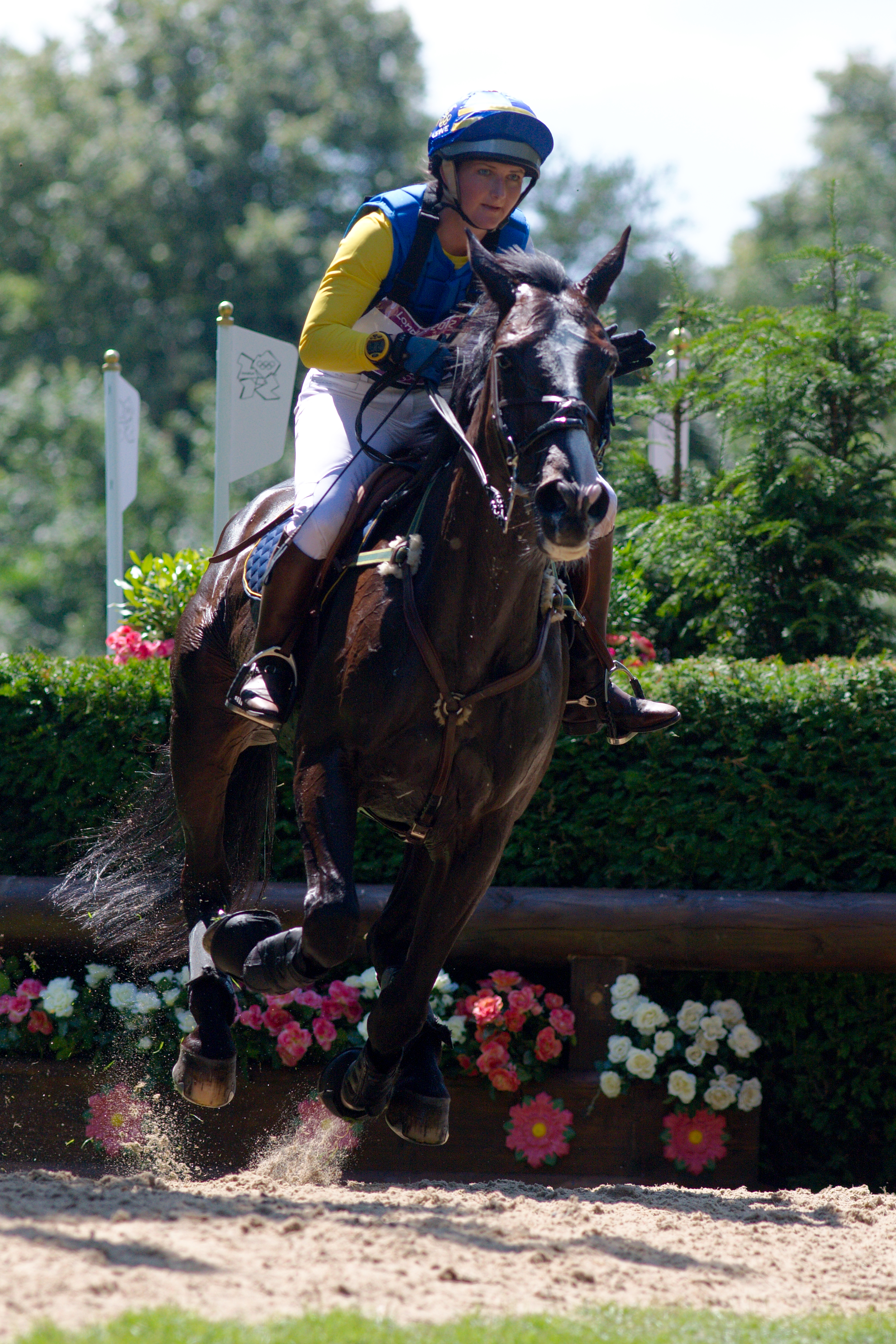
- Linda Algotsson and La Fair competing in the 2012 Summer Olympics in London.

Medal record

Equestrian

Representing Sweden

European Championships
Silver medal – second place	1999 Luhmühlen	Individual eventing
Silver medal – second place	2003 Punchestown	Individual eventing

Linda Camilla Algotsson (born 22 March 1972 in Rockneby, Sweden) is a Swedish Olympic eventing rider. She competed at five Summer Olympics (in 1996, 2004, 2008, 2012 and 2016). She finished 4th in team eventing on two occasions (in 2008 and 2012). Meanwhile, her current best individual Olympic result is 13th place from 2008.

Linda Algotsson also participated at five World Equestrian Games (each edition between 1994 and 2010) and at five European Eventing Championships (in 1999, 2003, 2005, 2009 and 2013). She won two individual silver medals at the European Championships with the horse Stand By Me. At the 2005 Europeans she finished 4th in the team portion.

She is the older sister of the fellow rider Sara Algotsson Ostholt. Her brother-in-law, Frank Ostholt, is also an eventing rider.
