= Toytown (horse) =

Horse

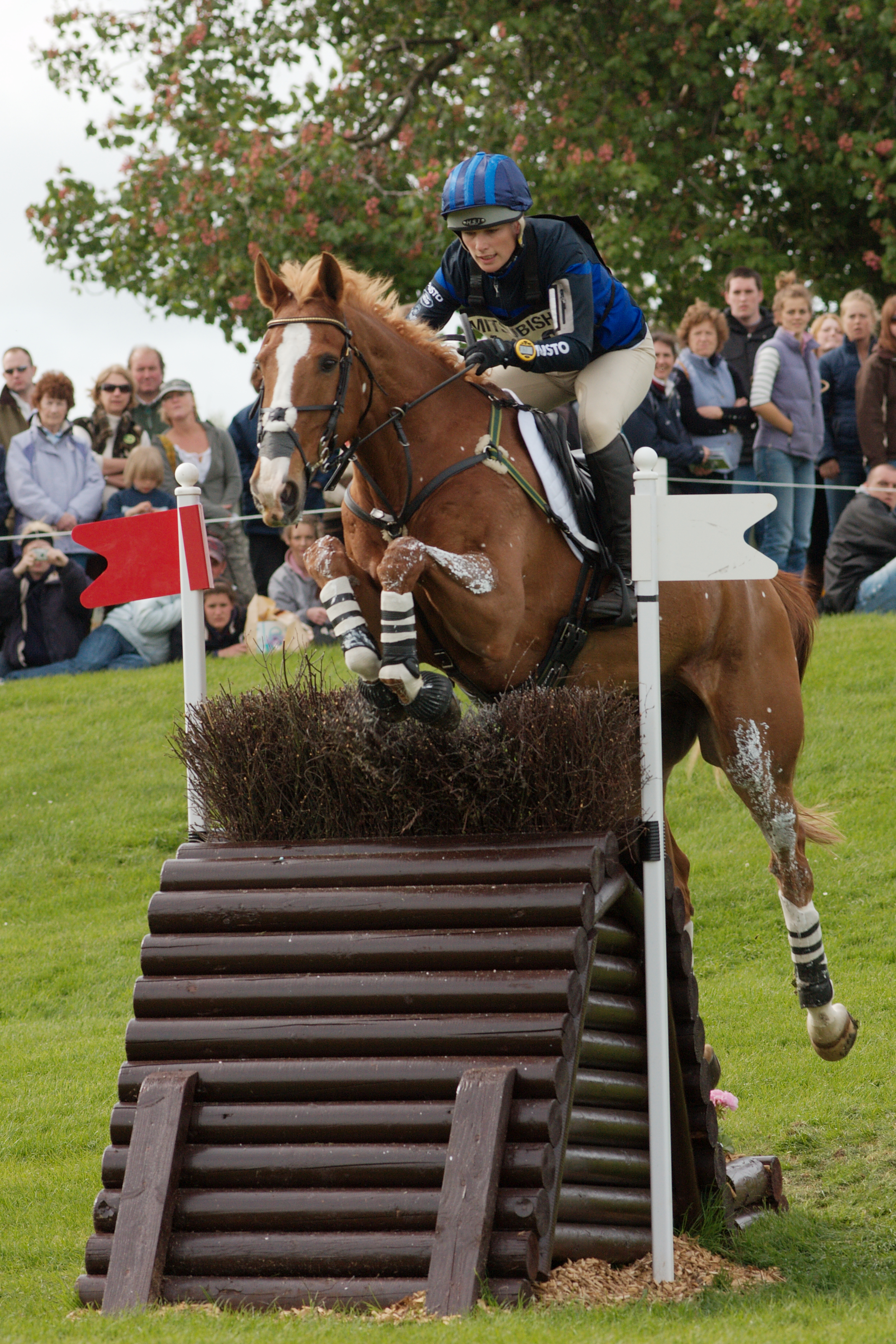
- Zara Phillips and Toytown jump the Alterian Hillside during the cross-country phase of Badminton Horse Trials 2009
- Breed: Irish Sport Horse
- Sire: Tipperary Grey (Irish Draught)
- Grandsire: River Bank (Irish Draught)
- Sex: Gelding
- Foaled: 1992
- Country: Britain
- Colour: Chestnut with blaze and Birdcatcher spots
- Trainer: Zara Phillips

Toytown
Medal record

Equestrian

World Equestrian Games
Gold medal – first place	2006 Aachen	Individual eventing
Silver medal – second place	2006 Aachen	Team eventing

European Eventing Championship
Gold medal – first place	2007 Rome	Team gold
Gold medal – first place	2005 Blenheim	Team gold
Gold medal – first place	2005 Blenheim	Individual gold

Toytown was a British event horse owned and ridden by Zara Phillips.

Toytown was a chestnut gelding born in 1992, standing at 17hh and with particularly distinctive markings including a white blaze and white spots. Toytown and Phillips competed together at the highest level of the sport until the horse's retirement in 2011, after accruing 1,421 British Eventing points in his career.

== Background ==
Toytown's exact breeding is unknown. Noddy was spotted as a 7-year-old novice eventer in 1999 by Zara's father, Mark Phillips, when rider and former owner Meryl Winter went to him for a lesson. Zara bought the horse a few months later after watching him jump with her stepmother and dressage coach Sandy Pflueger. Zara has since commented that he "looked a bit like a hat-rack when we first saw him but I got on really well with him." Despite Winter's description of him as a 'cross country machine', Toytown was far from a natural eventer, with a particular lack of respect for show jumps – at the Windsor CCI** in 2001, Zara and Toytown entered the ring in the lead only to finish out of the running with six fences down and 25 penalty points.

However, Zara and Toytown's hard work with Mark Phillips in the show jumping ring and Pflueger in the Dressage arena put paid to these teething problems, and the pair's first real success came with the Young Rider title at Bramham Horse Trials in 2002, followed by individual silver at the 2002 Young Riders European Championships in Austria.

This success was cemented in their CCI**** debut at Burghley Horse Trials in 2003. Competing at this level for the first time, over a particularly challenging course, Zara and Toytown found themselves in the lead after the cross country and missed overall victory by just one fence, losing to then-world number one Pippa Funnell on her way to the Rolex Grand Slam.

Far from being an easy horse to ride, Zara comments that he "doesn’t like performing these days unless it really matters" (something he demonstrated at the 2007 Festival of British Eventing when, according to the BBC's equestrian correspondent Clare Balding, he "went complete bonkers and started rearing" during the Dressage), and that "Toytown, almost always, has to do something to show he is in control."

== Olympic contender ==
A leg injury following Burghley forced Toytown out of contention for the 2004 Athens Olympics and the entire 2004 season, and an injury during final preparations for the 2008 Beijing Olympics forced the pair to concede their place in the British team.

== Retirement ==
Zara Phillips officially retired Toytown from competition on the final day of the 2011 Festival of British Eventing at Gatcombe Park. The popular gelding was paraded to fans and spectators in the main arena before leaving for the rolling Gloucestershire countryside of the Gatcombe Estate. Toytown made a post retirement public appearance with Phillips at Cheltenham racecourse in 2012 as part of the 2012 Summer Olympics torch relay.

== Death ==
Zara's husband, Mike Tindall, announced Toytown's death via Twitter on 27 June 2017.

== Major accomplishments ==
2007

- Team gold at the European Eventing Championships at Pratoni del Vivaro, Rome, Italy.

2006

- Individual gold and team silver at the World Equestrian Games in Aachen, Germany.

2005

- Individual and team gold at the European Eventing Championships at Blenheim
- 2nd Luhmuhlen Horse Trials (CCI****)

2003

- 2nd Burghley Horse Trials CCI****

2002

- Individual Silver at the European Young Riders Championship
