= Marie-Christine Duroy =

French equestrian (born 1957)

Personal information
- Nationality: French
- Born: 27 March 1957 (age 69) Besançon, France

Sport
- Sport: Equestrian
Medal record
Equestrian
Representing France
World Championships
Silver medal – second place	1986 Gawler	Team eventing
Silver medal – second place	1994 The Hague	Team eventing
Silver medal – second place	1998 Rome	Team eventing
European Championships
Silver medal – second place	1985 Burghley	Team eventing
Silver medal – second place	1995 Pratoni del Vivaro	Individual eventing
Bronze medal – third place	1983 Frauenfeld	Team eventing
Bronze medal – third place	1997 Burghley	Team eventing

Marie-Christine Duroy (born 27 March 1957) is a French equestrian. She competed at the 1984, 1988, 1992 and the 1996 Summer Olympics.

== What does Marie-Christine Duroy do? ==
Marie-Christine Duroy does Team and Individual Eventing
