= Richard Walker =

Richard Walker, Rick, Ricky, or Dick Walker may refer to:

== Law and politics ==
- Richard Walker (MP) (1784–1855), British member of parliament for Bury, 1832–1852
- Richard Wilde Walker (1823–1874), Confederate States of America politician
- Richard Flournoy Walker, Louisiana House of Representatives member
- Richard Wilde Walker Jr. (1857–1936), U.S. court of appeals judge
- Richard L. Walker (1922–2003), American scholar and ambassador
- Richard H. Walker (born 1950), American lawyer
- Rob Walker (New York politician) (Richard Robinson Walker, born 1974/5), American politician from New York

== Academia ==
- Dick Walker (astronomer) (1938–2005), American astronomer
- Richard Walker (priest) (died 1567), English priest, archdeacon of Derby, Lichfield, and dean of Chester
- Richard Walker (philosopher) (1679–1764), English professor of moral philosophy at the University of Cambridge

== Sports ==
=== American football ===
- Dick Walker (American football) (1933–2013), American football player and coach
- Rick "Doc" Walker (born 1955), American football tight end
- Ricky Walker (born 1996), American football defensive lineman

=== Association football (soccer) ===
- Dick Walker (footballer, born 1889) (Richard Stringer Walker, 1889–1918), English footballer see List of Bury F.C. players (1–24 appearances)
- Dick Walker (footballer, born 1913) (1913–1988), English football player for West Ham United
- Richard Walker (footballer, born 1971), English football player for Notts County, Mansfield and Cheltenham Town
- Richard Walker (footballer, born 1977), English football player for Burton Albion
- Richard Walker (footballer, born 1980), English football player for Crewe Alexandra and Port Vale

=== Other sports ===
- Dick Walker (Australian footballer) (1872–1947), Australian rules footballer for Carlton
- Richard Walker (angler) (1918–1985), English angler and writer on angling
- Frank Walker (Australian rules footballer) (a.k.a. Dick Walker, born 1933), Australian rules footballer for Perth
- Richard Walker (equestrian) (born 1950), English equestrian

== Others ==
- Richard Walker (baritone) (1897–1989), English singer and actor
- Richard Walker (bishop) (born 1960), English Roman Catholic bishop
- Richard Walker (engineer) (1900–1982), British aircraft designer of the Gloster Javelin
- Richard A. Walker (1946–1979), American commercial diver killed in Wildrake diving accident
- Richard Walker (editor) (born c. 1956), Scottish journalist
- Richard Walker, Baron Walker of Broxton (born 1980), managing director of Iceland, British supermarket chain

== Other uses ==
- 10717 Dickwalker, minor planet named for the astronomer
