= Richard Walker (equestrian) =

British equestrian

Medal record

Equestrian

Representing Great Britain

European Championships
Gold medal – first place	1969 Haras-du-Pin	Team eventing
Gold medal – first place	1991 Punchestown	Team eventing
Silver medal – second place	1969 Haras-du-Pin	Individual eventing
Silver medal – second place	1991 Punchestown	Individual eventing

This article deals with Richard Walker, English equestrian. For other Richard Walkers, see: Richard Walker (disambiguation).

Richard Dorian Walker (born August 16, 1950, in Johannesburg) is best known for being the youngest rider ever to win the Badminton Horse Trials. At 18 years and 247 days, the British-born rode his mount, Pasha, to victory at Badminton in 1969. Although he tried to repeat his success, he never won the event again. However, the pair did go on to be part of the British Eventing Team at the 1969 European Championships (Haras-du-Pin, France), where they won not only the Team Gold, but also the Individual Silver medal. He won Burghley in 1980 and 1982, and in 1991 he returned to the British team, winning at the 1991 European Championships the gold and individual silver on Jacana. He appeared at the 1992 Summer Olympics.

Richard Walker is the son of Alexander Technique teachers Dick and Elisabeth Walker.
