= Blenheim, Oxfordshire =

Civil parish in Oxfordshire, England

Coordinates: 51.842°N 1.361°W

Blenheim
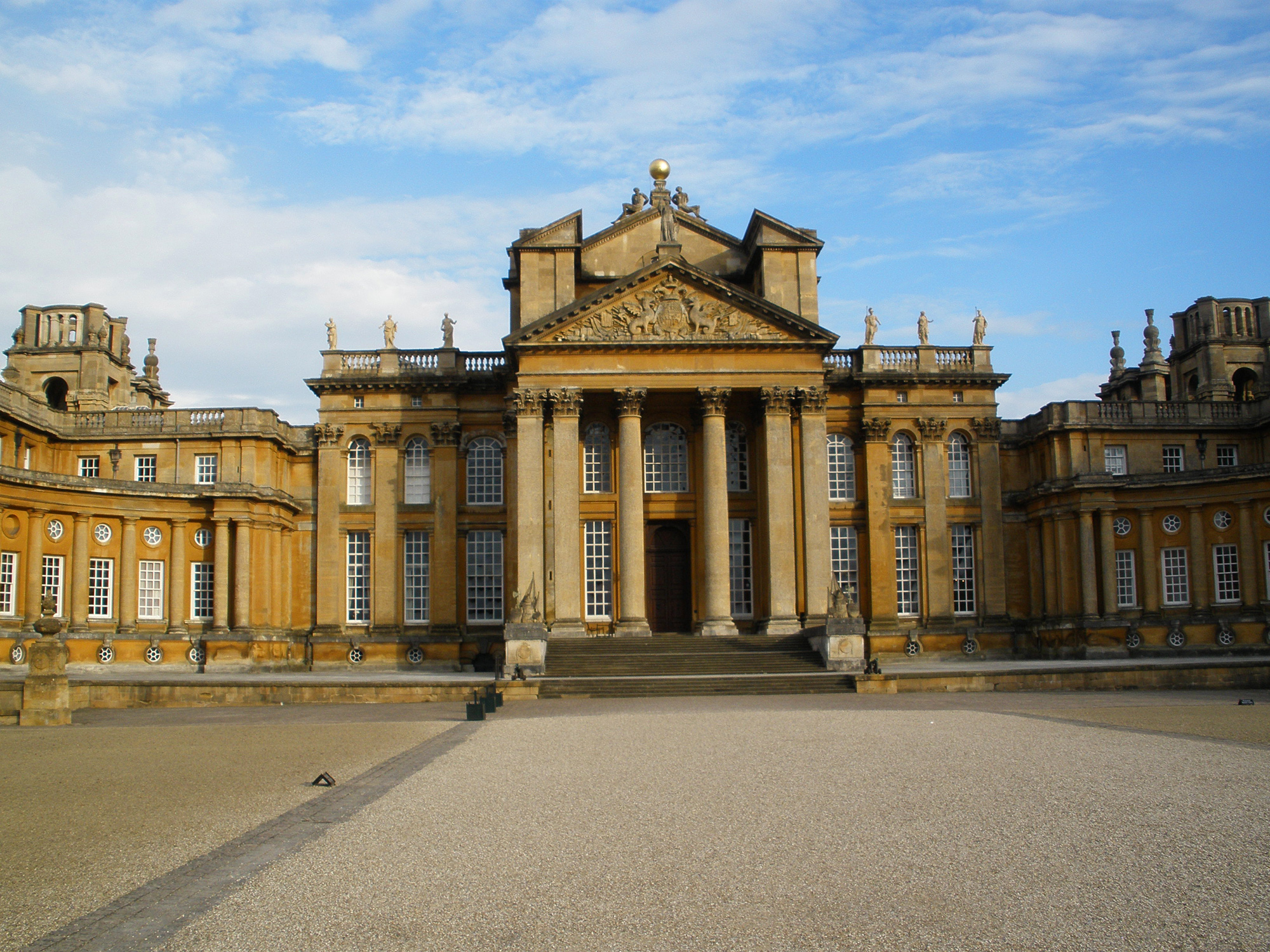
- Blenheim Palace

- Location within Oxfordshire
- Population: 78 (2001 census)
- Civil parish: Blenheim
- District: West Oxfordshire
- Shire county: Oxfordshire
- Region: South East
- Country: England
- Sovereign state: United Kingdom
- UK Parliament: Bicester and Woodstock

Blenheim is a civil parish in the West Oxfordshire district, in Oxfordshire, England, about 7 miles (11 km) north of Oxford. At its edge is Blenheim Palace, which is the birthplace of Sir Winston Churchill and the ancestral home of the Dukes of Marlborough. In 2001 it had a population of 78. The parish was formed on 1 April 1954 from Blenheim Park and part of Hensington Without.
