= Rockneby =

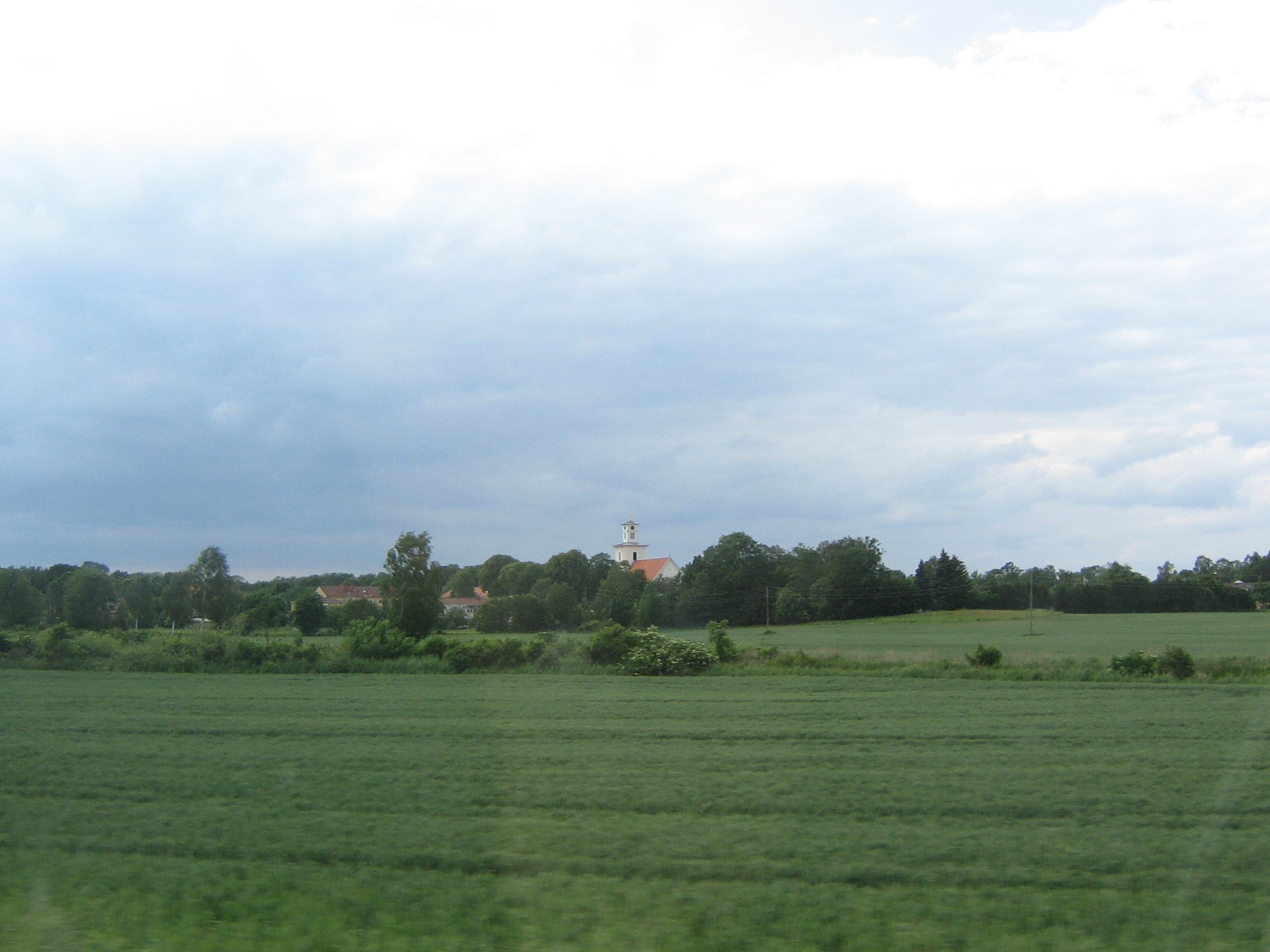

- Location within Kalmar Location within Sweden
- Coordinates: 56°49′N 16°20′E
- Country: Sweden
- Province: Småland
- County: Kalmar County
- Municipality: Kalmar Municipality

Area
  - Total: 1.63 km^{2} (0.63 sq mi)

Population (31 December 2010)
  - Total: 869
  - Density: 532/km^{2} (1,380/sq mi)
- Time zone: UTC+1 (CET)
  - Summer (DST): UTC+2 (CEST)

Rockneby is a locality situated in Kalmar Municipality, Kalmar County, Sweden with 869 inhabitants in 2010.
