= Equestrian at the 1960 Summer Olympics – Individual jumping =

Equestrian at the Olympics

Individual jumping at the Games of the XVII Olympiad
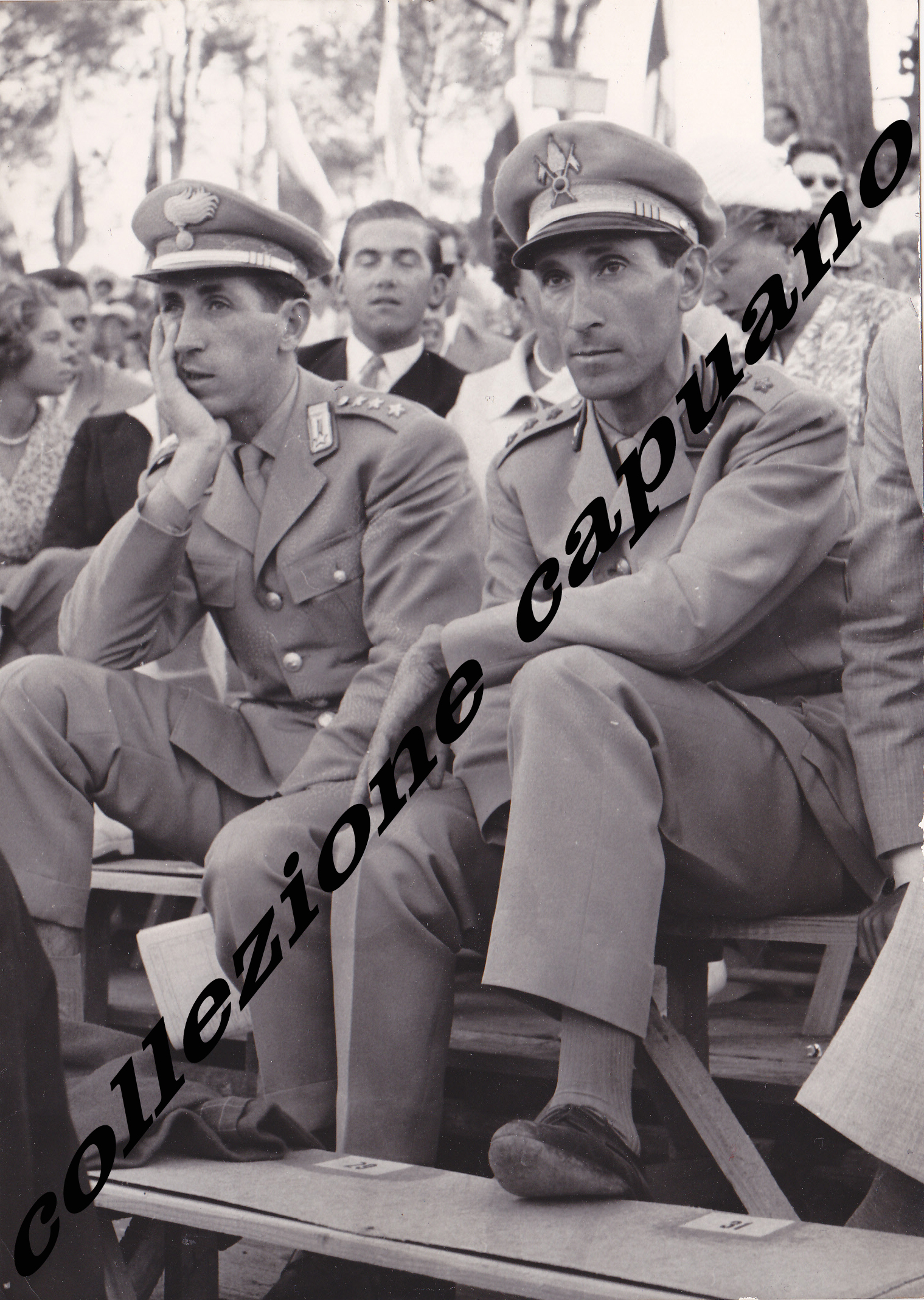
- Raimondo and Piero D'Inzeo at the Games
- Venue: Stadio Olimpico
- Date: 7 September 1960
- Competitors: 60 from 23 nations
- Winning total: 12 faults

Medalists
| 1st place, gold medalist(s) | | Raimondo D'Inzeo; Italy |
| 2nd place, silver medalist(s) | | Piero D'Inzeo; Italy |
| 3rd place, bronze medalist(s) | | David Broome; Great Britain |

The individual show jumping at the 1960 Summer Olympics took place on 7 September, at the Stadio Olimpico. The event was open to men and women. It was the 11th appearance of the event. There were 60 competitors from 23 nations. Each nation could have up to three riders. The event was won by Raimondo D'Inzeo of Italy, with his elder brother Piero D'Inzeo taking silver. The brothers (silver and bronze medalists, respectively, in 1956) were the second and third riders to win multiple medals in individual jumping; all three were Italian (Tommaso Lequio di Assaba had done it in 1920 and 1924). It was the nation's first gold medal in the event since Lequio di Assaba's in 1920; Italy's two golds tied France for most all-time. David Broome earned Great Britain's first medal in the event with his bronze.

== Background ==
This was the 11th appearance of the event, which had first been held at the 1900 Summer Olympics and has been held at every Summer Olympics at which equestrian sports have been featured (that is, excluding 1896, 1904, and 1908). It is the oldest event on the current programme, the only one that was held in 1900. There were two separate jumping competitions for individual and team medals, the first time this had occurred since 1920.

Eight of the top 10 riders from the 1956 competition returned: gold medalist Hans Günter Winkler of the United Team of Germany, silver medalist Raimondo D'Inzeo of Italy, bronze medalist Piero D'Inzeo of Italy, fourth-place finisher Fritz Thiedemann of the United Team of Germany, sixth-place finisher (and 1952 gold medalist) Pierre Jonquères d'Oriola of France, eighth-place finisher Carlos César Delía of Argentina, ninth-place finisher Mohamed Selim Zaki of Egypt, and tenth-place finisher Pat Smythe of Great Britain.

All three of the World Champions to date were competing. Raimondo D'Inzeo had followed his Olympic silver with the 1956 World Championship, with Spain's Paco Goyoaga, the inaugural World Champion in 1953, had finished second and Thiedemann third. Winkler had two World Championships (1954 and 1955) along with his 1956 Olympic gold.

New Zealand, the United Arab Republic, and Uruguay each made their debut in the event. France and Sweden both competed for the 10th time, tied for the most of any nation; Sweden had missed only the inaugural 1900 competition, while France missed the individual jumping in 1932.

== Summary ==
The individual medals were fought out between the two d'Inzeo brothers, Raimondo and Piero, David Broome, and Argentinean Naldo Dasso. The first round saw Raimondo d'Inzeo and Posillipo with the single clear, followed by Naldo Dasso with 4 penalties, and Piero d'Inzeo and his mount Max Fresson with eight. David Broome (7 penalties) had the best ride of the second round, while Piero d'Inzeo and Hans-Günter Winkler each had 8 faults, and the leader, Raimondo d'Inzeo had 3 rails down for 12 faults. Raimondo d'Inzeo's final score of 12 was still enough to win the gold, followed by his brother Piero and David Broome.

== Competition format ==
The competition used the two-round format introduced in 1952. The course was 840 metres long with 14 obstacles, including one double jump and one triple jump for a total of 17 jumps. The time limit was 2 minutes and 5 seconds; every second over the limit incurred a 0.25 point penalty. There were also penalties for obstacle faults. Each horse and rider pair completed the course twice, with the two scores summed to give a final total for ranking.

The individual and team events were separate, with the individual scores not used for team competition.

== Schedule ==
All times are Central European Time (UTC+1)

| Date | Time | Round |
|---|---|---|
| Wednesday, 7 September 1960 | 7:00 | Round 1 Round 2 |

== Results ==
60 riders competed, with 1 additional rider (A. Capuzzo of Italy) entered but not starting.

| Rank | Rider | Horse | Nation | Round 1 | | | Round 2 | | | Total |
| Rank | Rider | Horse | Nation | Faults | Time | Total | Faults | Time | Total | Total |
|---|---|---|---|---|---|---|---|---|---|---|
| 1st place, gold medalist(s) | Raimondo D'Inzeo | Posillipo | Italy | 0 | 0 | 0 | 12 | 0 | 12 | 12 |
| 2nd place, silver medalist(s) | Piero D'Inzeo | The Rock | Italy | 8 | 0 | 8 | 8 | 0 | 8 | 16 |
| 3rd place, bronze medalist(s) | David Broome | Sunslave | Great Britain | 16 | 0 | 16 | 7 | 0 | 7 | 23 |
| 4 | George H. Morris | Sinjon | United States | 12 | 0 | 12 | 12 | 0 | 12 | 24 |
| 5 | Hans Günter Winkler | Halla | United Team of Germany | 13 | 4 | 17 | 8 | 0 | 8 | 25 |
| 6 | Fritz Thiedemann | Meteor | United Team of Germany | 12 | 1.50 | 13.50 | 12 | 0 | 12 | 25.50 |
| 7 | Hugh Wiley | Master William | United States | 12 | 0 | 12 | 16 | 0 | 16 | 28 |
| 7 | Bernard de Fombelle | Buffalo B | France | 12 | 0 | 12 | 16 | 0 | 16 | 28 |
| 7 | Naldo Dasso | Final | Argentina | 4 | 0 | 4 | 24 | 0 | 24 | 28 |
| 10 | István Suti | Szepleany | Hungary | 12 | 0 | 12 | 16 | 0.50 | 16.50 | 28.50 |
| 11 | Pat Smythe | Flanagan | Great Britain | 20 | 0 | 20 | 12 | 0 | 12 | 32 |
| 11 | Henrique Callado | Martingil | Portugal | 16 | 0 | 16 | 16 | 0 | 16 | 32 |
| 13 | Carlos César Delía | Stromboli | Argentina | 16 | 0 | 16 | 20 | 0 | 20 | 36 |
| 14 | Max Fresson | Grand Veneur | France | 8 | 0 | 8 | 27 | 2.25 | 29.25 | 37.25 |
| 15 | William Steinkraus | Riviera Wonder | United States | 21 | 3 | 24 | 11 | 2.50 | 13.50 | 37.50 |
| 15 | Cevdet Sümer | Zambak | Turkey | 20 | 0 | 20 | 16 | 1.50 | 17.50 | 37.50 |
| 17 | Paco Goyoaga | Desirée | Spain | 19 | 1.50 | 20.50 | 20 | 0.75 | 20.75 | 41.25 |
| 18 | Pierre Jonquéres d'Oriola | Eclair au Chocolat | France | 16 | 0 | 16 | 23 | 2.50 | 25.50 | 41.50 |
| 19 | Ernesto Hartkopf | Blatasar | Argentina | 19 | 0.25 | 19.25 | 23 | 1.25 | 24.25 | 43.50 |
| 20 | Dawn Wofford | Hollandia | Great Britain | 16 | 0 | 16 | 28 | 0 | 28 | 44 |
| 20 | Germán Mailhos | Julian | Uruguay | 24 | 0 | 24 | 20 | 0 | 20 | 44 |
| 22 | Hans Möhr | Lausbub III | Switzerland | 23 | 0 | 23 | 19 | 2.75 | 21.75 | 44.75 |
| 23 | Adrian White | Telebrae | New Zealand | 27 | 6.25 | 33.25 | 12 | 0 | 12 | 45.25 |
| 24 | Juan Martínez | Charmeuse | Spain | 23 | 0 | 23 | 24 | 0 | 24 | 47 |
| 24 | Rafael Paullier | Arapey | Uruguay | 32 | 0 | 32 | 15 | 0 | 15 | 47 |
| 26 | Mohamed Selim Zaki | Artos | United Arab Republic | 16 | 0 | 16 | 32 | 0 | 32 | 48 |
| 26 | Alwin Schockemöhle | Ferdle | United Team of Germany | 32 | 3.75 | 35.75 | 12 | 0.25 | 12.25 | 48 |
| 28 | Gamal Haress | Nefertiti II | United Arab Republic | 20 | 0 | 20 | 32 | 0 | 32 | 52 |
| 29 | Kunihiro Ohta | Facey | Japan | 28 | 0 | 28 | 28 | 0 | 28 | 56 |
| 30 | Carlos Colombino | Guanaco | Uruguay | 16 | 0 | 16 | 37 | 6.50 | 43.50 | 59.50 |
| 31 | Nail Gonenli | Inka | Turkey | 32 | 0.50 | 32.50 | 28 | 2.75 | 30.75 | 63.25 |
| 32 | Vasile Pinciu | Birsan | Romania | 35 | 2 | 37 | 28 | 0 | 28 | 65 |
| 33 | Virgil Barbuceanu | Robot | Romania | 35 | 8.75 | 43.75 | 23 | 4.50 | 27.50 | 71.25 |
| 34 | Georges Hernalsteens | Hipparque | Belgium | 60 | 6 | 66 | 36 | 0 | 36 | 102 |
| — | Éamon O'Donohoe | Cluain Meala | Ireland | 20 | 0 | 20 | Eliminated | | | DNF |
| — | Elwi Gazi | Mabrouk | United Arab Republic | 23 | 0.75 | 23.75 | Eliminated | | | DNF |
| — | Anders Gernandt | Valor | Sweden | 24 | 0 | 24 | Did not start | | | DNF |
| — | Andrey Favorsky | Manevr | Soviet Union | 28 | 0 | 28 | Did not start | | | DNF |
| — | Mario Leite Neto | Sultão | Brazil | 27 | 2.75 | 29.75 | Did not start | | | DNF |
| — | Oscar da Silva | Cerrito | Brazil | 31 | 3 | 34 | Did not start | | | DNF |
| — | João Lopes | Rovuma II | Portugal | 40 | 0 | 40 | Did not start | | | DNF |
| — | Sean Daly | Loch Garman | Ireland | 39 | 1.25 | 40.25 | Did not start | | | DNF |
| — | Billy Ringrose | Loch an Easpaig | Ireland | 24 | 17 | 41 | Did not start | | | DNF |
| — | Paul Weier | Centurion | Switzerland | 45 | 1.25 | 46.25 | Did not start | | | DNF |
| — | Renyldo Ferreira | Marengo | Brazil | 45 | 5 | 50 | Did not start | | | DNF |
| — | António de Almeida | Palpite | Portugal | 33 | 18.50 | 51.50 | Did not start | | | DNF |
| — | Eduard Budil | Feldherr | Austria | Eliminated | | | Did not start | | | DNF |
| — | Hernán Espinosa | Frantillack | Spain | Eliminated | | | Did not start | | | DNF |
| — | Per Fresk | Kaskad | Sweden | Eliminated | | | Did not start | | | DNF |
| — | Yuzo Kageyama | Eforegiot | Japan | Eliminated | | | Did not start | | | DNF |
| — | Imre Karcsú | Aranyos | Hungary | Eliminated | | | Did not start | | | DNF |
| — | Kim Dong-gyu | Gracia | South Korea | Eliminated | | | Did not start | | | DNF |
| — | Salih Koc | Rolat | Turkey | Eliminated | | | Did not start | | | DNF |
| — | Gheorghe Langa | Rubin | Romania | Eliminated | | | Did not start | | | DNF |
| — | Fyodor Metelkov | Kover | Soviet Union | Eliminated | | | Did not start | | | DNF |
| — | Min Gwan-gi | Domfee | South Korea | Eliminated | | | Did not start | | | DNF |
| — | Dag Nätterqvist | Good Luck XX | Sweden | Eliminated | | | Did not start | | | DNF |
| — | Brigitte Schockaert | Muscadin | Belgium | Eliminated | | | Did not start | | | DNF |
| — | Ernest Shabaylo | Boston | Soviet Union | Eliminated | | | Did not start | | | DNF |
| — | Lajos Somlay | Okulj | Hungary | Eliminated | | | Did not start | | | DNF |
