= Equestrian at the 1960 Summer Olympics – Team jumping =

Equestrian at the Olympics

Team jumping at the Games of the XVII Olympiad
- Venue: Stadio Olimpico
- Date: 11 September 1960
- Competitors: 54 from 18 nations

Medalists
1st place, gold medalist(s)		Hans Günter Winkler; Fritz Thiedemann; Alwin Schockemöhle	United Team of Germany
2nd place, silver medalist(s)		Frank Chapot; William Steinkraus; George H. Morris	United States
3rd place, bronze medalist(s)		Raimondo D'Inzeo; Piero D'Inzeo; Antonio Oppes	Italy

The team jumping at the 1960 Summer Olympics took place on 11 September, at the Stadio Olimpico. The event was open to men and women. It was the 10th appearance of the event.

== Background ==
There were two separate jumping competitions for individual and team medals, the first time this had occurred since 1920. 54 riders from 18 countries competed in the team event, though only 1 out of every 3 teams finished the competition.

== Competition format ==
The course was 800 metres long with 14 obstacles, including one double jump and one triple jump for a total of 17 jumps. The time limit was 1 minute and 59 seconds; every second over the limit incurred a 0.25 point penalty. There were also penalties for obstacle faults. Each horse and rider pair completed the course twice, with the two scores summed to give a final total; the three scores for the team members were summed to give a team score for ranking. All three team members needed to finish for the team to have a valid score.

== Results ==
18 teams of 3 riders competed.

Rank	Nation	Individual results					Team result		
Rank	Nation	Rider	Horse	Round 1	Round 2	Total	Round 1	Round 2	Total
1st place, gold medalist(s)	United Team of Germany	Hans Günter Winkler	Halla	9.25	4	13.25	25.75	20.75	46.50
1st place, gold medalist(s)	United Team of Germany	Fritz Thiedemann	Meteor	8	8	16	25.75	20.75	46.50
1st place, gold medalist(s)	United Team of Germany	Alwin Schockemöhle	Ferdle	8.50	8.75	17.25	25.75	20.75	46.50
2nd place, silver medalist(s)	United States	Frank Chapot	Trail Guide	8	12	20	29	37	66
2nd place, silver medalist(s)	United States	William Steinkraus	Ksar d'Esprit	12.50	9	21.50	29	37	66
2nd place, silver medalist(s)	United States	George H. Morris	Sinjon	8.50	16	24.50	29	37	66
3rd place, bronze medalist(s)	Italy	Raimondo D'Inzeo	Posillipo	4	4	8	52.50	28	80.50
3rd place, bronze medalist(s)	Italy	Piero D'Inzeo	The Rock	24	8	32	52.50	28	80.50
3rd place, bronze medalist(s)	Italy	Antonio Oppes	The Scholar	24.50	16	40.50	52.50	28	80.50
4	United Arab Republic	Gamal Haress	Nefertiti II	16	8	24	67.50	68	135.50
4	United Arab Republic	Mohamed Selim Zaki	Artos	20	28	48	67.50	68	135.50
4	United Arab Republic	Elwi Gazi	Mabrouk	31.50	32	63.50	67.50	68	135.50
5	France	Bernard de Fombelle	Buffalo B	18.50	14	32.50	82.25	86.50	168.75
5	France	Max Fresson	Grand Veneur	24	26.25	50.25	82.25	86.50	168.75
5	France	Pierre Jonquéres d'Oriola	Eclair au Chocolat	39.75	46.25	86	82.25	86.50	168.75
6	Romania	Vasile Pinciu	Birsan	25.50	16	41.50	82.75	92.25	175
6	Romania	Virgil Barbuceanu	Robot	25.50	32.25	57.75	82.75	92.25	175
6	Romania	Gheorghe Langa	Rubin	31.75	44	75.75	82.75	92.25	175
–	Great Britain	David Broome	Sunsalve	12	4	16	Elim.	44	Elim.
–	Great Britain	Pat Smythe	Flanagan	12	16	28	Elim.	44	Elim.
–	Great Britain	David Barker	Franco	Elim.	24	Elim.	Elim.	44	Elim.
–	Argentina	Jorge Lucardi	Stromboli	12	20	32	Elim.	66.75	Elim.
–	Argentina	Carlos César Delía	Huipil	29.50	26	45.50	Elim.	66.75	Elim.
–	Argentina	Naldo Dasso	Final	Elim.	20.75	Elim.	Elim.	66.75	Elim.
–	Uruguay	German Mailhos	Julian	16	20	36	83.75	Elim.	Elim.
–	Uruguay	Rafael Paullier	Arapey	28	34.25	62.25	83.75	Elim.	Elim.
–	Uruguay	Carlos Colombino	Guanaco	39.75	Elim.	Elim.	83.75	Elim.	Elim.
–	Soviet Union	Andrey Favorsky	Manevr	8	16	24	115.25	Elim.	Elim.
–	Soviet Union	Vladimir Raspopov	Kodeks	50.75	31	81.75	115.25	Elim.	Elim.
–	Soviet Union	Ernest Shabaylo	Boston	56.50	Elim.	Elim.	115.25	Elim.	Elim.
–	Spain	Juan Martínez	Charmeuse	12	32	44	Elim.	Elim.	Elim.
–	Spain	Alfredo Goyeneche	Duncan	28	20	48	Elim.	Elim.	Elim.
–	Spain	Hernán Espinosa	Frantillack	Elim.	Elim.	Elim.	Elim.	Elim.	Elim.
–	Ireland	Billy Ringrose	Loch an Easpaig	24	16	40	Elim.	Elim.	Elim.
–	Ireland	Sean Daly	Loch Garman	35.75	40.75	66.50	Elim.	Elim.	Elim.
–	Ireland	Éamon O'Donohoe	Cluain Meala	Elim.	Elim.	Elim.	Elim.	Elim.	Elim.
–	Portugal	António de Almeida	Palpite	21.25	34.75	66	78.25	Elim.	Elim.
–	Portugal	Henrique Callado	Martingil	16.25	Elim.	Elim.	78.25	Elim.	Elim.
–	Portugal	João Lopes	Rovuma II	40.75	DNS	Elim.	78.25	Elim.	Elim.
–	Sweden	Anders Gernandt	Valor	16	20	36	Elim.	Elim.	Elim.
–	Sweden	Gustaf de Geer	Ugly	34	53.50	87.50	Elim.	Elim.	Elim.
–	Sweden	Per Fresk	Jabal	Elim.	Elim.	Elim.	Elim.	Elim.	Elim.
–	Japan	Yugo Araki	Fuji	28	36	64	Elim.	Elim.	Elim.
–	Japan	Kunihiro Ohta	Facey	36	28	64	Elim.	Elim.	Elim.
–	Japan	Yuzo Kageyama	Eforegiot	Elim.	Elim.	Elim.	Elim.	Elim.	Elim.
–	Turkey	Cevdet Sumer	Zambak	33	DNS	Elim.	Elim.	Elim.	Elim.
–	Turkey	Salih Koc	Rolat	48.75	DNS	Elim.	Elim.	Elim.	Elim.
–	Turkey	Nail Gonenli	Inka	Elim.	DNS	Elim.	Elim.	Elim.	Elim.
–	Hungary	István Suti	Szepleany	32.50	50.25	82.75	Elim.	Elim.	Elim.
–	Hungary	Imre Karcsu	Aranyos	Elim.	Elim.	Elim.	Elim.	Elim.	Elim.
–	Hungary	László Móra	Szertelen	Elim.	DNS	Elim.	Elim.	Elim.	Elim.
–	Brazil	Renyldo Ferreira	Marengo	27.25	DNS	Elim.	Elim.	Elim.	Elim.
–	Brazil	Oscar da Silva	Cerrito	Elim.	DNS	Elim.	Elim.	Elim.	Elim.
–	Brazil	Mario Leite Neto	Sultão	Elim.	DNS	Elim.	Elim.	Elim.	Elim.
