= Venezuela at the 1956 Summer Olympics =

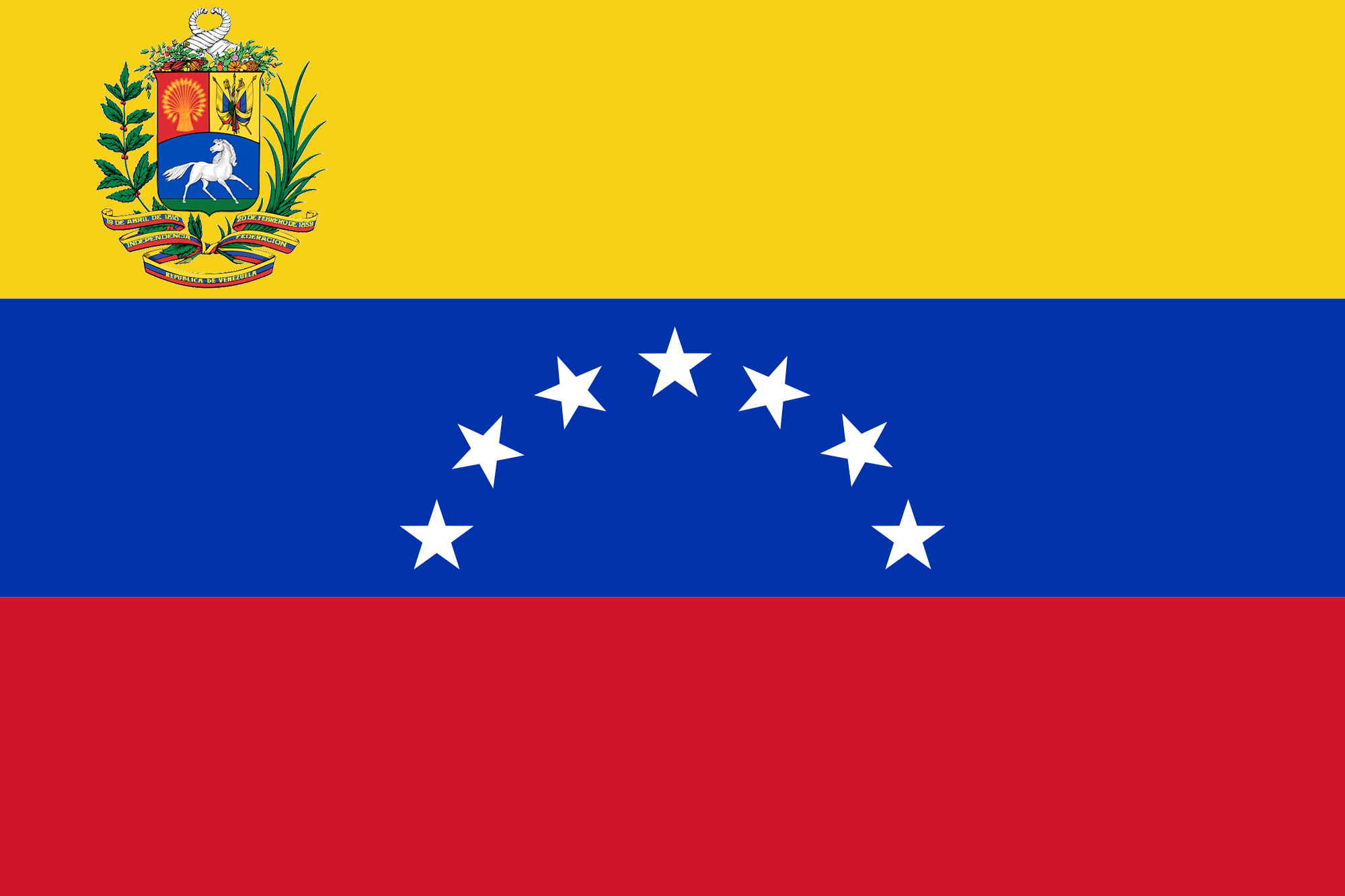
- IOC code: VEN
- NOC: Venezuelan Olympic Committee

in Melbourne, Australia/Stockholm, Sweden 22 November–8 December 1956
- Competitors: 22 in 5 sports
- Flag bearer: Rafael Romero
- Medals: Gold 0 Silver 0 Bronze 0 Total 0

Summer Olympics appearances (overview)
- 1948; 1952; 1956; 1960; 1964; 1968; 1972; 1976; 1980; 1984; 1988; 1992; 1996; 2000; 2004; 2008; 2012; 2016; 2020; 2024

Venezuela competed at the 1956 Summer Olympics held in Melbourne, Australia, and in the equestrian events held in Stockholm, Sweden. Twenty-two competitors, all men, were selected by the Venezuelan Olympic Committee to take part in sixteen events across five sports. The delegation featured no female competitors, for the second time, and won no medals. While most of the Venezuelan athletes did not advance past the qualifying rounds of their sports, there were some good placings in the shooting, with Germán Briceño and Carlos Monteverde finishing in the top 10 of their events.

== Background ==
Venezuela competed at the Summer Olympic Games for the third time in 1956. For the Melbourne/Stockholm Games, Venezuela had representation with a member on the International Olympic Committee (IOC), Dr. Julio Bustamante. The IOC provided a total of 130 event handbooks to be distributed by the Venezuelan Olympic Committee (VOC), including 15 each for fencing and shooting, events it had sent many athletes to compete in at the last Games. Handbooks were offered in English, French, or Spanish, with Venezuela receiving Spanish copies. In Melbourne, Venezuela's Olympic attaché was a Miss. W. Bond.

== Competitors ==
For the 1956 Summer Olympic Games, the Venezuelan delegation sent 22 athletes, fewer than at the 1952 Games. All of the athletes were men, something that has happened on four occasions, first in 1948, and later in 1968 and 1980. Until the 2000s, female participation was low. The 1956 Games was the first time, and one of only three times, a Venezuelan equestrian representation was sent to a Summer Olympic Games; the nation did not send another equestrian team until 1988.

Nineteen Venezuelan athletes competed in Melbourne. The delegation, of 28 men, arrived on 15 November and were housed at the Olympic Village in Heidelberg. Their blocks were situated in the eastern side of the Village between those of Chile and Portugal. With kitchens cooking separately for nations of "similar eating habits", the Venezuelan delegation was grouped with those of Argentina, Brazil, Chile, Colombia, Italy, Portugal, Peru and Uruguay.

| Sport | Men | Women | Total |
|---|---|---|---|
| Athletics | 4 | 0 | 4 |
| Boxing | 2 | 0 | 2 |
| Cycling | 4 | 0 | 4 |
| Equestrian | 3 | 0 | 3 |
| Shooting | 9 | 0 | 9 |
| Total | 22 | 0 | 22 |

== Athletics ==
In Athletics, 718 athletes of 59 countries competed in 33 events between 23 November and 1 December at the Melbourne Cricket Ground. Four athletes represented Venezuela in three events.

=== Track ===
Rafael Romero and Clive Bonas competed in the first round of the 100 metres event on 23 November. Romero placed fourth in the third heat, with a time of 10.9 seconds. Bonas placed third in heat 7, with the same time. Only the first two placers of each first round heat advanced. The same qualifying rule was applied to the 200 metres event, for which the first round was held on 26 November. Romero also competed in this event, as did Apolinar Solórzano; Romero placed third in heat 10 with a time of 21.8 seconds, while Solórzano, running in heat 4, was disqualified. Alfonso Bruno joined these three for the 4 × 100 metres relay. In the first round on 30 November, the top three teams from each heat qualified for the semi-final; the Venezuelan team placed fourth in heat 1 with a time of 42.0 seconds. Bonas had competed in the relay event for Venezuela at the 1955 Pan American Games, winning the silver medal, and he and Romero improved on their Olympics performance in it at the 1960 Games.

| Athlete | Event | Heat | | Quarterfinal | | Semifinal | | Final | |
| Athlete | Event | Result | Rank | Result | Rank | Result | Rank | Result | Rank |
|---|---|---|---|---|---|---|---|---|---|
| Clive Bonas | Men's 100 metres | 10.9 | 3 | did not advance | | | | | |
| Rafael Romero | Men's 100 metres | 10.9 | 4 | did not advance | | | | | |
| Rafael Romero | Men's 200 metres | 21.8 | 3 | did not advance | | | | | |
| Apolinar Solórzano | Men's 200 metres | No mark | ^{DQ} | did not advance | | | | | |
| Alfonso Bruno; Apolinar Solórzano; Clive Bonas; Rafael Romero | Men's 4 × 100 m relay | 42.0 | 4 | —N/a | —N/a | did not advance | | | |

== Boxing ==
There were 161 boxers from 34 countries at the Games, competing in 10 events between 23 November and 1 December at the West Melbourne Stadium. Two boxers represented Venezuela in two events.

Carlos Rodríguez competed in the light welterweight category. In the first round, held on 24 November, Rodríguez was defeated by H. V. Petersen of Denmark on points. Enrique Tovar competed as a welterweight in the first round on the same day; he was also defeated on points, losing to Pearce Allen Lane from the United States.

| Athlete | Event | Round One | Round Two | Quarterfinals | Semifinals | Final | |
| Athlete | Event | Opposition Result | Opposition Result | Opposition Result | Opposition Result | Opposition Result | Rank |
|---|---|---|---|---|---|---|---|
| Carlos Rodríguez | Men's light-welterweight | Petersen (DEN); L | did not advance | | | | |
| Enrique Tovar | Men's welterweight | Lane (USA); L | Did not advance | —N/a | did not advance | | |

== Cycling ==
There were six cycling events at the Games, held from 3 to 7 December at the Olympic Park Velodrome in Melbourne, for track events, and at Broadmeadows for road events. Four cyclists represented Venezuela in three events.

=== Track ===
Venezuela competed in the 4,000 metres team pursuit, with a team comprising Franco Cacioni, Domingo Rivas, Arsenio Chirinos, and Antonio Montilla. In the elimination heats, held on 3 December, the eight best overall times advanced. The Venezuelan team raced against the Austrian team in heat 5, and lost the heat, with neither country proceeding; Austria's time of over 5 minutes was beaten by teams that lost their heats.

| Athlete | Event | Round 1 | Quarterfinals | Semifinals | Final | |
| Athlete | Event | Opposition Time | Opposition Time | Opposition Time | Opposition Time | Rank |
|---|---|---|---|---|---|---|
| Franco Cacioni; Domingo Rivas; Arsenio Chirinos; Antonio Montilla | Men's Team Pursuit | Austria; L | did not advance | | | |

=== Road ===
The same four cyclists competed in the road event, in both the individual and team races, contested at the same time on 7 December. None of them finished.

| Athlete | Event | Rank | Time |
|---|---|---|---|
| Franco Cacioni | Men's Individual Road Race | did not finish | |
| Franco Cacioni | Men's Team Road Race | did not finish | |
| Domingo Rivas | Men's Individual Road Race | did not finish | |
| Domingo Rivas | Men's Team Road Race | did not finish | |
| Arsenio Chirinos | Men's Individual Road Race | did not finish | |
| Arsenio Chirinos | Men's Team Road Race | did not finish | |
| Antonio Montilla | Men's Individual Road Race | did not finish | |
| Antonio Montilla | Men's Team Road Race | did not finish | |

== Equestrian ==
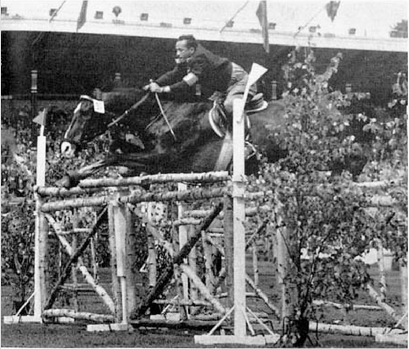
Jesús Rivas competing on Murachi at the Games.

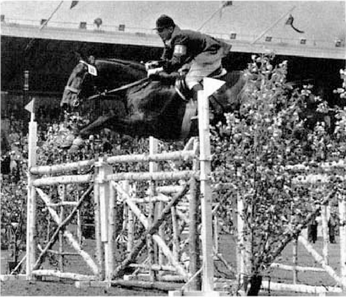
Roberto Moll competing on Sorocaima at the Games.

Australia, following Commonwealth quarantine restrictions, would have had strict regulations on bringing in horses for the equestrian events; it was agreed to hold these events in the northern summer in Stockholm, several months before the rest of the Games. The attaché to Venezuela in Stockholm was S. H. Hultman. At the Games, the Medal of Merit of the Equestrian Games of the XVIth Olympiad in Stockholm 1956 was awarded to various non-competing persons, including the Venezuelan Major Clemente Sánchez Valderrama.

Six equestrian events were held between 11 and 17 June at the Stockholm Olympic Stadium. In the jumping event, riders and horses were to complete a course with 14 obstacles. There were two rounds on the same course, and positions were decided by the total score. Faults were incurred by refusing to jump, running out, falls of the riders from the horse or both, rail down with the hooves, land any foot in the water in the water jump, and time penalties. Scores for the individual and team events were awarded for the same performance.

Venezuela sent three riders and horses to two jumping events. None of the men finished in either the individual or team event; no riders at all completed the jumping course in the first round, and only some were fit to ride again. The official report by the Games' Organizing Committee noted that the fifth gate was particularly difficult.

| Athlete | Horse | Event | Round 1 | | Round 2 | | Final | |
| Athlete | Horse | Event | Penalties | Rank | Penalties | Rank | Total | Rank |
|---|---|---|---|---|---|---|---|---|
| Víctor Molina | Tamanaco | Individual jumping | 108.5 | ^{DNF} | did not start | | Eliminated | |
| Jesús Rivas | Murachi | Individual jumping | 108.5 | ^{DNF} | did not start | | Eliminated | |
| Roberto Moll | Sorocaima | Individual jumping | 108.5 | ^{DNF} | did not start | | Eliminated | |
| Víctor Molina; Jesús Rivas; Roberto Moll | Tamanaco; Murachi; Sorocaima | Team jumping | 325.5 | ^{DNF} | did not start | | Eliminated | |

== Shooting ==
The shooting events were held between 29 November and 5 December on the Army rifle range at Williamstown, Australia. Nine shooters represented Venezuela in six events. One of the shooting officials, the President of the Range Jury for Classing Committees, was the Venezuelan H. Schlaepfer. For the shooting events, a two-week practice period was held before the games. However, the facilities constructed at the Army range were not complete in time for this due to adverse weather affecting construction. This weather continued during the practice period, with strong winds and heavy rain; the shooting committees expressed concern.

| Athlete | Event | Final | |
| Athlete | Event | Points | Rank |
|---|---|---|---|
| Hector de Lima Polanco | Free Pistol, 50 metres | 511 | 24 |
| José Bernal | Free Pistol, 50 metres | 508 | 25 |
| Carlos Monteverde | Rapid Fire Pistol, 25 metres | 572 | 10 |
| Carlos Crassus | Rapid Fire Pistol, 25 metres | 555 | 20 |
| Germán Briceño | Running Target, Single And Double Shot | 375 | 9 |
| Juan Llabot | Small-Bore Rifle, Three Positions, 50 metres | 1,118 | 32 |
| Juan Llabot | Small-Bore Rifle, Prone, 50 metres | 592 | 33 |
| Enrique Lucca | Small-Bore Rifle, Prone, 50 metres | 594 | 25 |
| Franco Mignini | Trap | 172 | 13 |
| Raúl Olivo | Trap | 165 | 19 |

Men's free pistol

In the free pistol event on 30 November, Venezuela was represented by Hector de Lima Polanco, who had competed in 1952, and José Bernal. Each athlete fired 60 rounds, in six sets of ten; they could take practice shots before and between sets, up to 18 practice shots. In his sets, de Lima Polanco shot 91, 83, 87, 84, 82, 84, placing 24th. Bernal came 25th, shooting 85, 82, 86, 86, 80, 89.

Men's silhouette (rapid fire pistol, 25 m)

The silhouette, a rapid-fire shooting event over 25 m. There were two courses of 30 rounds, for 60 total, played over two days. Each course was broken down into three sets of ten, each scored out of 100, to give an overall score out of 600. At Melbourne, the Silhouette event took place on 4 and 5 December, and shooters were allowed to take five practice shots (without a time limit) before each course. The Venezuelan representatives were Carlos Monteverde and Carlos Crassus. Monteverde placed 10th, missing no shots and scoring 96, 99, 95 on the first course (for 290, joint-3rd on the first day) and 93, 95, 94 on the second course (for 282). His score was 572/60. Crassus placed 20th, also not missing any shots. He scored 96, 90, 89 on the first course (for 275) and 99, 95, 86 on the second course (for 280). His score was 555/60.

Men's running deer (single and double shot)

The running deer or running target event had been added at the previous Games, and features shooters aiming to hit a moving target with 100 shots over two courses on two days. They shoot from 100 m, with each course broken into three sets. The first course of 50 shots were single shots, broken into the first two rounds of 20 shots and the last of 10. The second course was double shots broken into two rounds of 10 and one of 5. Before each set, shooters were allowed two trial runs. Venezuela was represented by Germán Briceño, who placed ninth of eleven. In the single shot course, he scored 62, 79, 39 for 180, and in the double shot course he scored 79, 77, 39 for 195. His score was 375.

Men's small-bore rifle (three positions, 50 m)

Juan Llabot competed in the small-bore rifle events. In the full set, or three positions, event, held on 4 December, 120 shots were fired in series of ten, which were completed in two courses; in the first course, 40 shots were fired lying prone followed by 40 kneeling. In the second course, 40 shots were taken while standing. Up to ten practice shots per position could be taken, before or between the series of ten. Llabot placed 32nd, shooting 100, 99, 98, 99 (for 396) prone; 91, 89, 96, 93 (for 369) kneeling; and 87, 86, 89, 91 (for 353) standing, taking a total of 1,118 (out of a possible 1,200).

Men's small-bore rifle (prone, 50 m)

Llabot was joined in the prone small-bore rifle event held on 5 December by Enrique Lucca. In it, six series of 10 shots, in two courses, were taken and scored out of 100 for a possible 600; previously in the event, 40 shots were fired for total possible 400. Ten practice shots could be taken before or between the series. Despite performing best in the prone position in the three position event, Llabot placed worse in the prone event, coming 33rd. He shot 98, 98, 100, 99, 98, 99, for a total of 592. Lucca did better, scoring 97, 100, 100, 98, 99, 100, for a total of 594, placing 25th.

Men's trap (clay pigeon)

The men's trap was contested for Venezuela by Franco Mignini and Raúl Olivo. It was held over three days, with one course per day. 200 clay pigeons were shot in total; 75 each on 29 and 30 November, and 50 on 1 December. Each course was broken into rounds of 25 shots. Mignini shot 21, 20, 19 in the first course, 22, 19, 25 in the second course, and 24, 22 in the third course, for a total of 172 and 13th place. Olivo shot 21, 18, 21 in the first course, 23, 20, 18 in the second course, and 22, 22 in the third course, for a total of 165 and 19th place.
