= Equestrian at the 1956 Summer Olympics – Individual jumping =

Equestrian at the Olympics

Individual jumping at the Games of the XVI Olympiad
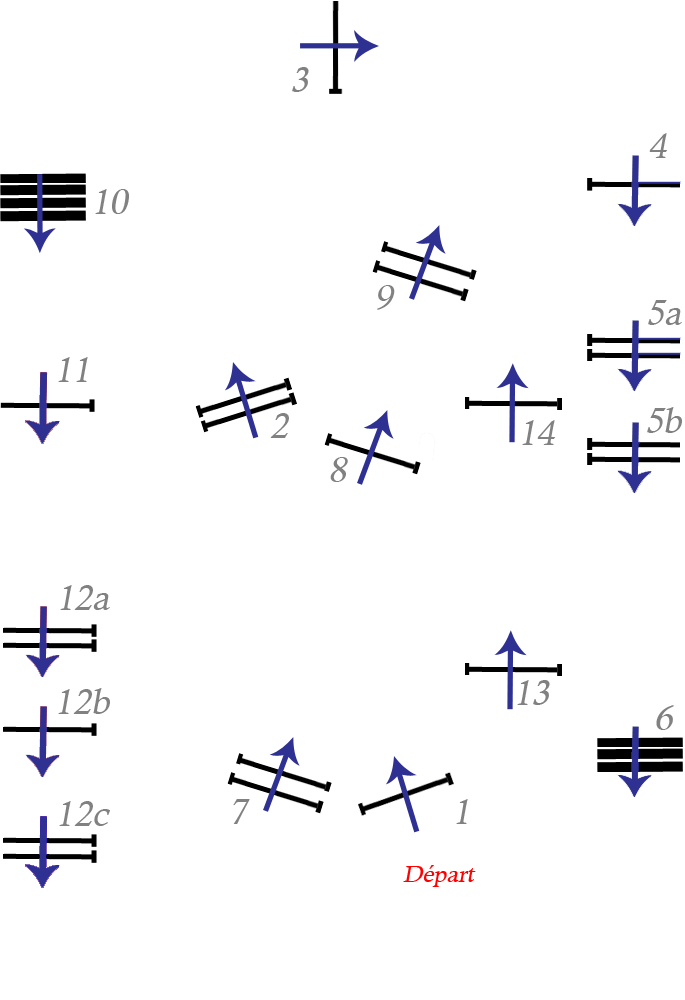
- The course
- Venue: Stockholm Olympic Stadium
- Date: 17 June 1956
- Competitors: 66 from 24 nations
- Winning total: 4

Medalists
| 1st place, gold medalist(s) | | Hans Günter Winkler; United Team of Germany |
| 2nd place, silver medalist(s) | | Raimondo D'Inzeo; Italy |
| 3rd place, bronze medalist(s) | | Piero D'Inzeo; Italy |

The individual show jumping at the 1956 Summer Olympics took place on 17 June, at the Stockholm Olympic Stadium. The event was open to men and women, with two women competing. It was the 10th appearance of the event. There were 66 competitors from 24 nations, with each nation able to send a team of up to three riders and the team and individual events sharing results. The event was won by Hans Günter Winkler of the United Team of Germany, a victory in the debut for that nation though Germany had won in 1936. Brothers Raimondo D'Inzeo and Piero D'Inzeo took silver and bronze, respectively, the first medals for Italy in individual jumping since 1924.

== Background ==
This was the 10th appearance of the event, which had first been held at the 1900 Summer Olympics and has been held at every Summer Olympics at which equestrian sports have been featured (that is, excluding 1896, 1904, and 1908). It is the oldest event on the current programme, the only one that was held in 1900.

Five of the top 10 riders from the 1952 competition returned: gold medalist Pierre Jonquères d'Oriola of France, bronze medalist Fritz Thiedemann of Germany (now competing as the United Team of Germany), fourth-place finisher Eloy de Menezes of Brazil, fifth-place finisher Wilfred White of Great Britain, and seventh-place finisher Raimondo D'Inzeo of Italy. The first two World Champions in the event, Paco Goyoaga of Spain (1953) and Hans Günter Winkler of the United Team of Germany (1954 and 1955) were present, with Winkler favored in the competition.

Australia, Cambodia, and Venezuela each made their debut in the event; East and West Germany competed together as the United Team of Germany for the first time. France and Sweden both competed for the ninth time, tied for the most of any nation; Sweden had missed only the inaugural 1900 competition, while France missed the individual jumping in 1932.

== Competition format ==
The competition used the two-round format introduced in 1952. Scores from the two runs were added together for a total score.

The team and individual jumping competitions used the same results. The course had 13 obstacles. The time limit was 1 minute, 56.1 seconds. Penalty points were received for obstacle faults (3, 4, 6, or 8 points based on severity) or exceeding the time limit (0.25 points per second or fraction thereof over the limit). A third refusal or jumping an obstacle out of order resulted in elimination.

== Schedule ==
All times are Central European Time (UTC+1)

| Date | Time | Round |
|---|---|---|
| Sunday, 17 June 1956 | 9:00; 16:00 | Round 1 Round 2 |

== Results ==
66 riders competed. For the first time since 1932, no jump-off was required to determine the medalists.

Winkler led after one round with 4 faults. In second was defending champion Jonquères d'Oriola at 7. There were five riders tied for third at 8, including both D'Inzeo brothers. Winkler suffered a pulled groin and would have withdrawn except that doing so would cost his teammates a chance at a team event medal (Germany led, but all three riders had to finish). He rode the second round dosed with (visibly insufficient) painkillers and coffee.

Despite those impediments, Winkler was one of three riders to ride a clean second round (though one, López, had a .75 time penalty). He both took the individual gold and led Germany to the team gold. The other rider to come out of round 2 with no faults was the younger D'Inzeo, Raimondo. With Jonquères d'Oriola having a relatively poor second round (at 8 faults), the Frenchman fell to sixth—leaped over by 4 of the 5 men who had been tied for third after round 1. Raimondo's clean round earned him silver; his elder brother Piero's 3 second-round faults was good for bronze. Thiedemann and White each had 4 faults in the second round, tying for fourth.

The first two women to compete in the event, Pat Smythe and Brigitte Schockaert, finished 10th and 34th, respectively.

| Rank | Rider | Horse | Nation | Round 1 | | | Round 2 | | | Total |
| Rank | Rider | Horse | Nation | Faults | Time | Total | Faults | Time | Total | Total |
|---|---|---|---|---|---|---|---|---|---|---|
| 1st place, gold medalist(s) | Hans Günter Winkler | Halla | United Team of Germany | 4 | 0 | 4 | 0 | 0 | 0 | 4 |
| 2nd place, silver medalist(s) | Raimondo D'Inzeo | Merano | Italy | 8 | 0 | 8 | 0 | 0 | 0 | 8 |
| 3rd place, bronze medalist(s) | Piero D'Inzeo | Uruguay | Italy | 8 | 0 | 8 | 3 | 0 | 3 | 11 |
| 4 | Fritz Thiedemann | Meteor | United Team of Germany | 8 | 0 | 8 | 4 | 0 | 4 | 12 |
| 4 | Wilfred White | Nizefela | Great Britain | 8 | 0 | 8 | 4 | 0 | 4 | 12 |
| 6 | Pierre Jonquères d'Oriola | Voulette | France | 7 | 0 | 7 | 7 | 1 | 8 | 15 |
| 7 | Henrique Callado | Martingil | Portugal | 12 | 0 | 12 | 4 | 0 | 4 | 16 |
| 8 | Carlos César Delía | Discutido | Argentina | 15 | 0 | 15 | 4 | 0 | 4 | 19 |
| 9 | Mohamed Selim Zaki | Insh' Allah | Egypt | 16 | 0 | 16 | 4 | 0 | 4 | 20 |
| 10 | Pat Smythe | Flanagan | Great Britain | 8 | 0 | 8 | 11 | 2 | 13 | 21 |
| 11 | Albert Szatola | Aranyos | Hungary | 16 | 0 | 16 | 8 | 0 | 8 | 24 |
| 11 | Hugh Wiley | Trail Guide | United States | 16 | 0 | 16 | 8 | 0 | 8 | 24 |
| 11 | Alfons Lütke Westhues | Ala | United Team of Germany | 16 | 0 | 16 | 8 | 0 | 8 | 24 |
| 14 | Carlos López | Tapatío | Spain | 27 | 0 | 27 | 0 | 0.75 | 0.75 | 27.75 |
| 15 | Paco Goyoaga | Fahnenkönig | Spain | 20 | 0 | 20 | 8 | 0 | 8 | 28 |
| 15 | William Steinkraus | Night Owl | United States | 20 | 0 | 20 | 8 | 0 | 8 | 28 |
| 17 | Pedro Mayorga | Coriolano | Argentina | 16 | 0 | 16 | 16 | 0 | 16 | 32 |
| 18 | Kevin Barry | Ballyneety | Ireland | 23 | 0 | 23 | 12 | 0 | 12 | 35 |
| 19 | William de Rham | Va-Vite | Switzerland | 20 | 0 | 20 | 16 | 0 | 16 | 36 |
| 19 | Peter Robeson | Scorchin | Great Britain | 16 | 0 | 16 | 20 | 0 | 20 | 36 |
| 21 | Andrey Favorsky | Maneuvr | Soviet Union | 20 | 0 | 20 | 20 | 0 | 20 | 40 |
| 21 | Gamal Haress | Nefertity II | Egypt | 20 | 0 | 20 | 20 | 0 | 20 | 40 |
| 23 | Billy Ringrose | Liffey Vale | Ireland | 24 | 0 | 24 | 20 | 0 | 20 | 44 |
| 24 | Salvatore Oppes | Pagoro | Italy | 19 | 4 | 23 | 24 | 0 | 24 | 47 |
| 25 | Naldo Dasso | Ramito | Argentina | 16 | 0 | 16 | 19 | 13.5 | 32.5 | 48.5 |
| 26 | Koichi Kawaguchi | Fuji | Japan | 28 | 0 | 28 | 24 | 0 | 24 | 52 |
| 27 | Frank Chapot | Belair | United States | 35 | 1.25 | 36.25 | 16 | 0 | 16 | 52.25 |
| 27 | Patrick Kiernan | Ballynonty | Ireland | 19 | 0 | 19 | 29 | 4.25 | 33.25 | 52.25 |
| 29 | Bernard de Fombelle | Doria | France | 12 | 0 | 12 | 39 | 1.75 | 40.75 | 52.75 |
| 30 | Salih Koç | Basak | Turkey | 24 | 0 | 24 | 28 | 1.25 | 29.25 | 53.25 |
| 31 | Kunihiro Ohta | Eforegiot | Japan | 20 | 0 | 20 | 32 | 2.25 | 34.25 | 54.25 |
| 32 | Anders Gernandt | Röhäll | Sweden | 32 | 0 | 32 | 19 | 4 | 23 | 55 |
| 33 | Nelson Pessoa Filho | Relincho | Brazil | 32 | 0 | 32 | 23 | 3 | 26 | 58 |
| 34 | Brigitte Schockaert | Muscadin | Belgium | 32 | 0 | 32 | 27 | 0 | 27 | 59 |
| 34 | Alexander Stoffel | Bricole | Switzerland | 27 | 0 | 27 | 32 | 0 | 32 | 59 |
| 36 | Carlos Figueroa | Gracieux | Spain | 21 | 12.5 | 33.5 | 28 | 0 | 28 | 61.5 |
| 37 | Marc Büchler | Duroc | Switzerland | 25 | 3.5 | 28.5 | 36 | 0 | 36 | 64.5 |
| 38 | Alpaslan Günes | Esmer Altin | Turkey | 29 | 4.25 | 33.25 | 32 | 0 | 32 | 65.25 |
| 39 | Vladimir Raspopov | Kodex | Soviet Union | 32 | 0 | 32 | 27 | 17.5 | 44.5 | 76.5 |
| 40 | Wilhelm Stewen | Lojal | Finland | 47 | 0 | 47 | 36 | 0 | 36 | 83 |
| 41 | Eloy de Menezes | Biguá | Brazil | 31 | 25.25 | 56.25 | 25 | 3.75 | 28.75 | 85 |
| 42 | Renyldo Ferreira | Bibelot | Brazil | 21 | 8.25 | 29.25 | 41 | 15.25 | 56.25 | 85.5 |
| 43 | Raymond Lombard | Dandy | Belgium | 39 | 11.5 | 50.5 | 36 | 0 | 36 | 86.5 |
| 44 | Georges Calmon | Virtuoso | France | 41 | 13.75 | 54.75 | 32 | 0 | 32 | 86.75 |
| 45 | Tor Burman | Rouquade | Sweden | 35 | 8.25 | 43.25 | 39 | 18.75 | 57.75 | 101 |
| — | Georges Poffé | Hicamboy | Belgium | 12 | 0 | 12 | Eliminated | | | Eliminated |
| — | Omar El-Hadary | Auer | Egypt | 69 | 19.5 | 88.5 | Eliminated | | | Eliminated |
| — | Kauko Paananen | Lassi | Finland | 37 | 7.5 | 44.5 | Eliminated | | | Eliminated |
| — | Lajos Somlay | Dobos | Hungary | Eliminated | | | 47 | 4.25 | 51.25 | Eliminated |
| — | Arvi Tervalampi | Marras | Finland | Eliminated | | | Eliminated | | | Eliminated |
| — | Boris Lilov | Boston | Soviet Union | Eliminated | | | Eliminated | | | Eliminated |
| — | Bedri Böke | Domino | Turkey | Eliminated | | | Eliminated | | | Eliminated |
| — | István Szondy | Higany | Hungary | Eliminated | | | Eliminated | | | Eliminated |
| — | Rodrigo da Silveira | Limerick | Portugal | Eliminated | | | Did not start | | | Eliminated |
| — | João Azevedo | Licorne | Portugal | Eliminated | | | Did not start | | | Eliminated |
| — | Víctor Molina | Tamanaco | Venezuela | Eliminated | | | Did not start | | | Eliminated |
| — | Jesús Rivas | Murachi | Venezuela | Eliminated | | | Did not start | | | Eliminated |
| — | Roberto Moll | Sorocaima | Venezuela | Eliminated | | | Did not start | | | Eliminated |
| — | Peter Lichtner-Hoyer | Rienzi | Austria | Eliminated | | | Did not start | | | Eliminated |
| — | Adolf Lauda | Schönbrunn | Austria | Eliminated | | | Did not start | | | Eliminated |
| — | Romuald Halm | Bianka | Austria | Eliminated | | | Did not start | | | Eliminated |
| — | Birck Elgaaen | Osira | Norway | Eliminated | | | Did not start | | | Eliminated |
| — | Douglas Wijkander | Bimbo | Sweden | Eliminated | | | Did not start | | | Eliminated |
| — | Bert Jacobs | Dumbell | Australia | Eliminated | | | Did not start | | | Eliminated |
| — | Saing Pen | Pompon | Cambodia | Eliminated | | | Did not start | | | Eliminated |
| — | Isoup Ganthy | Flatteur II | Cambodia | Eliminated | | | Did not start | | | Eliminated |
