= Equestrian at the 1956 Summer Olympics – Team jumping =

Equestrian at the Olympics

Team jumping at the Games of the XVI Olympiad
- Venue: Stockholm Olympic Stadium
- Date: 17 June 1956
- Competitors: 66 from 24 nations

Medalists
| 1st place, gold medalist(s) | | Hans Günter Winkler | United Team of Germany |
| 2nd place, silver medalist(s) | | Raimondo D'Inzeo | Italy |
| 3rd place, bronze medalist(s) | | Piero D'Inzeo | Italy |

The individual jumping at the 1956 Summer Olympics took place on 17 June, at the Stockholm Olympic Stadium. The event was open to men and women. It was the 10th appearance of the event.

== Competition format ==
The team and individual jumping competitions used the same results. The course had 13 obstacles. The time limit was 1 minute, 56.1 seconds. Penalty points were received for obstacle faults (3, 4, 6, or 8 points based on severity) or exceeding the time limit (0.25 points per second or fraction thereof over the limit). A third refusal or jumping an obstacle out of order resulted in elimination. Scores from the two runs were added together for a total score. The three individual scores were summed to give a team score.

== Results ==
20 teams of 3 (60 riders) competed. Only half of the teams had all 3 riders complete both runs of the course.

| Rank | Nation | Individual results | | | | | Team result | | |
| Rank | Nation | Rider | Horse | Round 1 | Round 2 | Total | Round 1 | Round 2 | Total |
|---|---|---|---|---|---|---|---|---|---|
| 1st place, gold medalist(s) | United Team of Germany | Hans Günter Winkler | Halla | 4 | 0 | 4 | 28 | 12 | 40 |
| 1st place, gold medalist(s) | United Team of Germany | Fritz Thiedemann | Meteor | 8 | 4 | 12 | 28 | 12 | 40 |
| 1st place, gold medalist(s) | United Team of Germany | Alfons Lütke Westhues | Ala | 16 | 8 | 24 | 28 | 12 | 40 |
| 2nd place, silver medalist(s) | Italy | Raimondo D'Inzeo | Merano | 8 | 0 | 8 | 39 | 27 | 66 |
| 2nd place, silver medalist(s) | Italy | Piero D'Inzeo | Uruguay | 8 | 3 | 11 | 39 | 27 | 66 |
| 2nd place, silver medalist(s) | Italy | Salvatore Oppes | Pagoro | 23 | 24 | 47 | 39 | 27 | 66 |
| 3rd place, bronze medalist(s) | Great Britain | Wilfred White | Nizefela | 8 | 4 | 12 | 32 | 37 | 69 |
| 3rd place, bronze medalist(s) | Great Britain | Pat Smythe | Flanagan | 8 | 13 | 21 | 32 | 37 | 69 |
| 3rd place, bronze medalist(s) | Great Britain | Peter Robeson | Scorchin | 16 | 20 | 36 | 32 | 37 | 69 |
| 4 | Argentina | Carlos César Delía | Discutido | 15 | 4 | 19 | 47 | 52.5 | 99.5 |
| 4 | Argentina | Pedro Mayorga | Coriolano | 16 | 16 | 32 | 47 | 52.5 | 99.5 |
| 4 | Argentina | Naldo Dasso | Ramito | 16 | 32.5 | 48.5 | 47 | 52.5 | 99.5 |
| 5 | United States | Hugh Wiley | Trail Guide | 16 | 8 | 24 | 72.25 | 32 | 104.25 |
| 5 | United States | William Steinkraus | Night Owl | 20 | 8 | 28 | 72.25 | 32 | 104.25 |
| 5 | United States | Frank Chapot | Belair | 36.25 | 16 | 52.25 | 72.25 | 32 | 104.25 |
| 6 | Spain | Carlos López | Tapatío | 27 | 0.75 | 27.75 | 80.5 | 36.75 | 117.25 |
| 6 | Spain | Paco Goyoaga | Fahnenkönig | 20 | 8 | 28 | 80.5 | 36.75 | 117.25 |
| 6 | Spain | Carlos Figueroa | Gracieux | 33.5 | 28 | 61.5 | 80.5 | 36.75 | 117.25 |
| 7 | Ireland | Kevin Barry | Ballyneety | 23 | 12 | 35 | 66 | 65.25 | 131.25 |
| 7 | Ireland | Billy Ringrose | Liffey Vale | 24 | 20 | 44 | 66 | 65.25 | 131.25 |
| 7 | Ireland | Patrick Kiernan | Ballynonty | 19 | 33.25 | 52.25 | 66 | 65.25 | 131.25 |
| 8 | France | Pierre Jonquères d'Oriola | Voulette | 7 | 8 | 15 | 73.75 | 80.75 | 154.5 |
| 8 | France | Bernard de Fombelle | Doria | 12 | 40.75 | 52.75 | 73.75 | 80.75 | 154.5 |
| 8 | France | Georges Calmon | Virtuoso | 54.75 | 32 | 86.75 | 73.75 | 80.75 | 154.5 |
| 9 | Switzerland | William de Rham | Va-Vite | 20 | 16 | 36 | 75.5 | 84 | 159.5 |
| 9 | Switzerland | Alexander Stoffel | Bricole | 27 | 32 | 59 | 75.5 | 84 | 159.5 |
| 9 | Switzerland | Marc Büchler | Duroc | 28.5 | 36 | 64.5 | 75.5 | 84 | 159.5 |
| 10 | Brazil | Nelson Pessoa Filho | Relincho | 32 | 26 | 58 | 117.5 | 111 | 228.5 |
| 10 | Brazil | Eloy de Menezes | Biguá | 56.25 | 28.75 | 85 | 117.5 | 111 | 228.5 |
| 10 | Brazil | Renyldo Ferreira | Bibelot | 29.25 | 56.25 | 85.5 | 117.5 | 111 | 228.5 |
| – | Belgium | Brigitte Schockaert | Muscadin | 32 | 27 | 59 | 94.5 | Elim. | Eliminated |
| – | Belgium | Raymond Lombard | Dandy | 50.5 | 36 | 86.5 | 94.5 | Elim. | Eliminated |
| – | Belgium | Georges Poffé | Hicamboy | 12 | Elim. | Elim. | 94.5 | Elim. | Eliminated |
| – | Egypt | Mohamed Selim Zaki | Insh' Allah | 16 | 4 | 20 | 124.5 | Elim. | Eliminated |
| – | Egypt | Gamal Haress | Nefertity II | 20 | 20 | 40 | 124.5 | Elim. | Eliminated |
| – | Egypt | Omar El-Hadary | Auer | 88.5 | Elim. | Elim. | 124.5 | Elim. | Eliminated |
| – | Soviet Union | Andrey Favorsky | Maneuvr | 20 | 20 | 40 | Elim. | Elim. | Eliminated |
| – | Soviet Union | Vladimir Raspopov | Kodex | 32 | 44.5 | 76.5 | Elim. | Elim. | Eliminated |
| – | Soviet Union | Boris Lilov | Boston | Elim. | Elim. | Elim. | Elim. | Elim. | Eliminated |
| – | Turkey | Salih Koç | Basak | 24 | 29.25 | 53.25 | Elim. | Elim. | Eliminated |
| – | Turkey | Alpaslan Günes | Esmer Altin | 33.25 | 32 | 65.25 | Elim. | Elim. | Eliminated |
| – | Turkey | Bedri Böke | Domino | Elim. | Elim. | Elim. | Elim. | Elim. | Eliminated |
| – | Sweden | Anders Gernandt | Röhäll | 32 | 23 | 55 | Elim. | Elim. | Eliminated |
| – | Sweden | Tor Burman | Rouquade | 43.25 | 57.75 | 101 | Elim. | Elim. | Eliminated |
| – | Sweden | Douglas Wijkander | Bimbo | Elim. | DNS | Elim. | Elim. | Elim. | Eliminated |
| – | Finland | Wilhelm Stewen | Lojal | 47 | 36 | 83 | Elim. | Elim. | Eliminated |
| – | Finland | Kauko Paananen | Lassi | 44.5 | Elim. | Elim. | Elim. | Elim. | Eliminated |
| – | Finland | Arvi Tervalampi | Marras | Elim. | Elim. | Elim. | Elim. | Elim. | Eliminated |
| – | Portugal | Henrique Callado | Martingil | 12 | 4 | 16 | Elim. | Elim. | Eliminated |
| – | Portugal | Rodrigo da Silveira | Limerick | Elim. | DNS | Elim. | Elim. | Elim. | Eliminated |
| – | Portugal | João Azevedo | Licorne | Elim. | DNS | Elim. | Elim. | Elim. | Eliminated |
| – | Hungary | Albert Szatola | Aranyos | 16 | 8 | 24 | Elim. | Elim. | Eliminated |
| – | Hungary | Lajos Somlay | Dobos | Elim. | 51.25 | Elim. | Elim. | Elim. | Eliminated |
| – | Hungary | István Szondy | Higany | Elim. | Elim. | Elim. | Elim. | Elim. | Eliminated |
| – | Austria | Peter Lichtner-Hoyer | Rienzi | Elim. | DNS | Elim. | Elim. | Elim. | Eliminated |
| – | Austria | Adolf Lauda | Schönbrunn | Elim. | DNS | Elim. | Elim. | Elim. | Eliminated |
| – | Austria | Romuald Halm | Bianka | Elim. | DNS | Elim. | Elim. | Elim. | Eliminated |
| – | Venezuela | Víctor Molina | Tamanaco | Elim. | DNS | Elim. | Elim. | Elim. | Eliminated |
| – | Venezuela | Jesus Rivas | Murachi | Elim. | DNS | Elim. | Elim. | Elim. | Eliminated |
| – | Venezuela | Roberto Moll | Sorocaima | Elim. | DNS | Elim. | Elim. | Elim. | Eliminated |
