= Deaths in September 2003 =

The following is a list of notable deaths in September 2003.

Entries for each day are listed alphabetically by surname. A typical entry lists information in the following sequence:

- Name, age, country of citizenship at birth, subsequent country of citizenship (if applicable), reason for notability, cause of death (if known), and reference.

== September 2003 ==
=== 1 ===
- Rand Brooks, 84, American film actor (Gone with the Wind, Babes in Arms, The Adventures of Rin Tin Tin).
- Pasquale Buonocore, 87, Italian water polo player and Olympic champion (1948).
- Bob Dotter, 64, American racing driver.
- Albert Frey, 90, German SS commander during World War II and author, suicide by gunshot.
- Terry Frost, 87, British artist.
- Eulalio González, 81, Mexican actor, singer-songwriter, screenwriter, film director, and film producer.
- John Gould, 94, American columnist, humorist and essayist.
- John Gray, 66, British diplomat.
- Jayant Pathak, 82, Indian poet and literary critic.
- Héctor Rodríguez, 83, Cuban baseball player (Chicago White Sox).
- Jack Smight, 78, American theatre and film director, cancer.
- Ramón Serrano Suñer, 101, Spanish politician.
- Mildred Thompson, 67, American artist.

=== 2 ===
- George Charles Hayter Chubb, 3rd Baron Hayter, 92, British politician and industrialist.
- Frank Grigonis, 86, American football player (Chattanooga Mocs, Detroit Lions).
- Nehemiah Levanon, 88, Israeli intelligence agent and diplomat.
- Maria Manton, 92, French painter.
- Ptolemy Reid, 91, Guyanese veterinarian and politician, prime minister (1980–1984).
- Bruce Waibel, 45, American musician and bass guitar player (FireHouse, Gregg Allman Band, Santana), suicide.
- Peter West, 83, British BBC presenter and sports commentator, best known for his cricket, tennis and rugby coverage.

=== 3 ===
- Ray Davis, 88, United States Marine Corps four-star-general, heart attack.
- Alan Dugan, 80, American poet.
- Bill Farrow, 85, American basketball player.
- Paul Jennings Hill, 49, American anti-abortion activist, execution by lethal injection.
- Rudolf Leiding, 88, German chairman of the Volkswagen automobile company.
- Charles Liebman, 68, American political scientist and author on Jewish life and Israel.
- Andrzej Nartowski, 71, Polish basketball player and Olympian (1960).
- Ilias Petropoulos, 75, Greek author, folklorist and urban historian, cancer.
- Mohsin Zaidi, 68, Indian Urdu poet.

=== 4 ===
- Ben Aris, 66, English actor (Hi-de-Hi!, The Charge of the Light Brigade, Stepping Out).
- Lola Bobesco, 82, Romanian-Belgian violinist.
- Béla H. Bánáthy, 83, Hungarian-American educator, systems and design scientist and author.
- Susan Chilcott, 40, English opera singer, breast cancer.
- Omar El-Hadary, 78-79, Egyptian Olympic equestrian (1956).
- Charles A. Gabriel, 75, Chief of Staff of the United States Air Force, Alzheimer's disease.
- Jefferson Gottardi, 27, Bolivian footballer.
- David P. Robbins, 61, American mathematician, pancreatic cancer.
- Witold Szyguła, 62, Polish footballer and manager.
- Tibor Varga, 82, Hungarian violinist, conductor and pedagogue.

=== 5 ===
- Yūji Aoki, 58, Japanese manga artist, lung cancer.
- Kir Bulychev, 68, Soviet and Russian science fiction writer, critic and historian, cancer.
- Harley Grossman, 73, American baseball player (Washington Senators).
- Richard Harrison, 82, New Zealand politician.
- Sir Ian Hunter, 84, British classical music impresario and festival organizer.
- Poul Korup, 77, Danish rower and Olympian (1948).
- Gisele MacKenzie, 76, Canadian-American singer and entertainer, colorectal cancer.
- Miloš Minić, 89, Yugoslav and Serbian communist politician.
- James Rachels, 62, American philosopher, cancer.
- Benny Schnoor, 80, Danish Olympic cyclist (1948).
- C. H. Sisson, 89, British writer and poet.

=== 6 ===
- Charles Edward Bennett, 92, American politician (U.S. Representative for Florida's 2nd and 3rd congressional districts).
- Marshall Joseph Caifano, 92, Italian-American mobster (Chicago Outfit).
- Jules Engel, 94, American filmmaker, visual artist, and film director.
- Marie Foster, 85, American civil rights movement leader.
- Harry Goz, 71, American musical theater actor (Fiddler on the Roof) and voice actor (Sealab 2021), multiple myeloma.
- Ari Guðmundsson, 75, Icelandic Olympic swimmer and ski jumper (1948, 1952).
- Mamohato of Lesotho, 62, Lesotho Queen Mother and politician.
- Maurice Michael Otunga, 80, Kenyan Catholic prelate and cardinal.
- Louise Platt, 88, American theater, film, and TV actress.
- Paul Tobin, 93, American basketball player.

=== 7 ===
- Great Antonio, 77, Croatian-Canadian strongman, wrestler, actor and eccentric, heart attack.
- Joe McDonald, 74, Scottish footballer.
- Rudy Mobley, 81, American football player (Baltimore Colts).
- Mohammad Oraz, Iranian mountaineer, avalanche.
- Dean Thackwray, 70, American Olympic long-distance runner (1956).
- Robert Weinman, 88, American sculptor and "one of the nation's most accomplished medallic artists".
- Merv Wellington, 62, New Zealand politician (Member of Parliament for Manurewa, Papakura).
- Warren Zevon, 56, American singer and songwriter ("Werewolves of London", "Lawyers, Guns and Money", "Roland the Headless Thompson Gunner"), cancer.

=== 8 ===
- Herbert Gentry, 84, American expressionist painter.
- Marc Honegger, 77, French musicologist and choirmaster.
- Jaclyn Linetsky, 17, Canadian voice actress (Caillou, 15/Love, What's with Andy?), road accident.
- Doris Ogilvie, 91, Canadian diver and Olympian (1932).
- Gulabrai Ramchand, 76, Indian cricketer.
- Leni Riefenstahl, 101, German film director, producer, screenwriter, and photographer.
- Charles Trotter, 80, British photographer and Olympic sports shooter (1956, 1960).

=== 9 ===
- Thomas Allibone, 99, English physicist, focused on nuclear fusion and particle physics.
- David Applebaum, 51, American-Israeli physician, suicide bomb victim.
- Reginald Smith Brindle, 86, British composer and writer.
- Andrei Folbert, 72, Romanian basketball player and Olympian (1952).
- Joaquim Homs, 97, Spanish composer.
- Larry Hovis, 67, American actor (Hogan's Heroes), esophageal cancer.
- Ingemann Bylling Jensen, 77, Danish Olympic sailor (1952).
- Farrukh Fateh Ali Khan, 50, Pakistani musician.
- Aleksandr Moiseyev, 76, Russian basketball player and Olympic medalist (1952).
- Edward Teller, 95, Hungarian-American theoretical physicist, "Father of the H-Bomb".
- Madihe Pannaseeha Thero, 90, Sri Lankan Buddhist monk.
- Marthe Vogt, 100, German neuroscientist.
- Don Willesee, 87, Australian politician, member of the Australian Senate representing Western Australia.

=== 10 ===
- Josh Gibson Jr., 73, American baseball player.
- Larry Allen Hayes, 54, American spree killer, execution by lethal injection.
- Lee Kyung-hae, South Korean farmer and activist, suicide by stabbing.
- Boris Meissner, 88, German lawyer and social scientist.
- Martin Page, 65, British writer and journalist, heart problems.

=== 11 ===
- Shafilea Ahmed, 17, British-Pakistani girl, suffocation.
- Ben Bril, 91, Dutch boxer, Olympian (1928), and referee.
- Nicholas DiOrio, 82, Italian-American association football player, colorectal cancer.
- Richard Durante, 73, Canadian politician, member of the House of Commons of Canada (1968-1969).
- Anna Lindh, 46, Swedish foreign minister, stabbed.
- Ace Loomis, 75, American football player (Green Bay Packers).
- Antti Nurmesniemi, 76, Finnish designer.
- John Ritter, 54, American actor (Three's Company, Clifford The Big Red Dog, 8 Simple Rules), Emmy winner (1984), aortic dissection.

=== 12 ===
- Jack Burkitt, 77, English football player.
- Johnny Cash, 71, American Hall of Fame country singer ("Folsom Prison Blues", "I Walk the Line", "Ring of Fire"), diabetes.
- Chappie Fox, 90, American circus historian.
- Freddy Turner, 89, South African rugby player.

=== 13 ===
- George Boothman, 86, Canadian professional ice hockey player (Toronto Maple Leafs).
- Ron Burton, 67, American professional football player (Northwestern, Boston Patriots), bone cancer.
- Vítor Damas, 55, Portuguese football player, cancer.
- Howard D. Graves, 64, United States Army officer, cancer.
- Reza Beyk Imanverdi, 67, Iranian actor and director, lung cancer.
- Arthur Johnson, 82, Canadian Olympic canoeist (1952).
- Kaino Lempinen, 82, Finnish gymnast and Olympic medalist (1952).
- Frank O'Bannon, 73, American politician, Governor of Indiana (since 1997), stroke.
- Martin Riesen, 77, Swiss Olympic ice hockey player (1956).
- Bill Roe, 45, American football player (Dallas Cowboys, New Orleans Saints).
- Arthur Rowe, 67, English Olympic track and field athlete (1960).
- Johnny Welaj, 89, American baseball player (Washington Senators, Philadelphia Athletics).

=== 14 ===
- Donald O. Clifton, 79, American psychologist, author, researcher, and entrepreneur.
- Garrett Hardin, 88, American ecologist and philosopher, suicide.
- John Serry Sr., 88, Italian American musician composer and arranger.
- Yetunde Price, 31, American half-sister of Venus and Serena Williams, murdered in a shooting.
- Kurt Heinrich Wolff, 91, German-American sociologist.

=== 15 ===
- Garner Ted Armstrong, 73, American television evangelist, pneumonia.
- Phil Caira, 70, Scottish weightlifter and Olympian (1956, 1960).
- Juan Gazsó, 80, Serbian-born Argentine basketball player and Olympian (1952).
- Paul Granlund, 77, American sculptor.
- Errol Hill, 82, Trinidad and Tobago writer, playwright, actor.
- Josef Hiršal, 83, Czech author, poet and novelist.

=== 16 ===
- Jack Brymer, 88, British clarinetist (Royal Philharmonic Orchestra, BBC Symphony Orchestra, London Symphony Orchestra).
- Justo José Caraballo, 88, Argentine Olympic swimmer (1932).
- Donald Deacon, 83, Canadian politician, leukemia.
- John Orrell, 68, British author, theatre historian and academic, cancer.
- Sergio Ortega, 65, Chilean composer, pianist, poet, and politician, cancer.
- Sheb Wooley, 82, American actor (High Noon, Rawhide) and singer ("The Purple People Eater"), leukemia.

=== 17 ===
- Yitzhak Artzi, 82, Israeli politician.
- Leendert Ginjaar, 75, Dutch politician.
- Erich Hallhuber, 52, German actor, epileptic seizure.
- Ljubica Marić, 94, Yugoslav/Serbian classical composer.
- Raymond Milton, 91, Canadian ice hockey player and Olympic silver medalist (1936).
- George Sawaya, 80, American actor and stuntman.
- Buck Sydnor, 81, American basketball player (Western Kentucky Hilltoppers, Chicago Stags).
- Neal Wood, 81, American-British political theorist and author.

=== 18 ===
- Robert G. Bartle, 75, American mathematician, specialized in real analysis, lymphoma.
- Erich Bäumler, 73, German football player and manager.
- Pauline Crawley, 79, American baseball player.
- Jean Dieuzaide, 82, French photographer.
- Richard Alden Howard, 86, American botanist and plant taxonomist.
- Bob Mitchell, 76, British politician.
- Don Reese, 52, American gridiron football player (Miami Dolphins, New Orleans Saints), liver cancer.
- Sergey Smirnov, 43, Russian track and field athlete and Olympian (1988).

=== 19 ===
- Johnny Best, 89, American jazz trumpeter.
- Anatoly Bogatyrev, 90, Soviet and Belarusian composer and music teacher.
- Slim Dusty, 76, Australian country music singer-songwriter, guitarist and producer, lung cancer.
- Emil Fackenheim, 87, German Jewish philosopher and Reform rabbi.
- Alfred Grislawski, 83, German fighter pilot during World War II.
- Kenneth Erwin Hagin, 86, American preacher.
- Ellen Idelson, 42, American television producer, television writer and actress, complications from cancer and Crohn's disease.
- Arthur Kinoy, 82, American attorney and civil rights leader.
- Frank Lowe, 60, American jazz saxophonist, lung cancer.
- Adrian Shelford, 39, New Zealand rugby league footballer.
- Jim Thompson, 67, British Anglican bishop.

=== 20 ===
- Robert Blake, Baron Blake, 86, English historian and life peer, known for his biography of Benjamin Disraeli.
- Tom Busby, 66, Canadian actor (The War Lover, The Dirty Dozen, Heavenly Pursuits), heart attack.
- Lorenzo Calonga, 74, Paraguayan football player.
- Stanley Fafara, 54, American child actor, complications from hernia surgery.
- Ken Khouri, 86, Jamaican record producer.
- David Lawrence, 73, American alpine skier and Olympian (1952).
- Ivano Lussignoli, 31, Italian canoeist and Olympian (1996).
- Gordon Mitchell, 80, American actor and bodybuilder, heart attack.
- Gareth Williams, Baron Williams of Mostyn, 62, British Cabinet minister, Leader of the House of Lords.
- Simon Muzenda, 80, Zimbabwean politician and vice-president of Zimbabwe, diabetes.
- Maurizio Romano, 37, Italian voice actor, traffic collision.
- Vernon Singer, 84, Canadian politician.
- Sonora Webster Carver, 99, American entertainer.

=== 21 ===
- Amédée Domenech, 70, French rugby player, hepatitis.
- Pamela Gordon, 66, American actress (Weird Science, Stealing Harvard, Subspecies).
- Robert Lochner, 84, American journalist, pulmonary embolism.
- Lu Ann Simms, 71, American singer.
- Otis A. Singletary, 81, American historian.

=== 22 ===
- Arturo Ardao, 90, Uruguayan philosopher and historian.
- Howard Austen, 74, American confidant and companion of writer Gore Vidal, brain cancer.
- Maxime Brunfaut, 94, Belgian architect.
- Carlos Cubillos, 73, Chilean footballer.
- Gordon Jump, 71, American actor (WKRP in Cincinnati, Soap, Growing Pains), respiratory failure.
- Richard Lankford, 89, American politician, member of the United States House of Representatives (1955-1965).
- Wolfgang Peters, 74, German football player.
- Lee Robinson, 80, Australian producer, director and screenwriter.
- Hugo Young, 64, British journalist and political commentator (The Guardian, The Observer), colorectal cancer.

=== 23 ===
- Rosalie Allen, 79, American country musician and television and radio host, known as Queen of the Yodelers.
- Earl Brown, 87, American football and basketball player and coach (Auburn).
- Henri Cogan, 89, French actor and stuntman.
- Simcha Dinitz, 74, Israeli statesman and politician.
- John E. Flynn, 91, American politician.
- Gustaf de Geer, 82, Swedish Olympic equestrian (1960).
- Theodore R. Kupferman, 83, American politician, member of the United States House of Representatives (1966-1969).
- Rex Robbins, 68, American actor (1776, Shaft, The Royal Tenenbaums), stroke.
- Bernie Williams, 57, American basketball player (La Salle Explorers, San Diego Rockets, Virginia Squires), colorectal cancer.

=== 24 ===
- Yoshinobu Ashihara, 85, Japanese architect.
- Lyle Bettger, 88, American actor (The Greatest Show on Earth, Nevada Smith, Hawaii Five-O).
- Herb Gardner, 68, American commercial artist, cartoonist, playwright and screenwriter.
- Hugh Gregg, 85, American politician, Governor of New Hampshire (1953–1955).
- Benson Masya, 33, Kenyan long-distance runner, illness.
- Roman Muzyk, 65, Polish Olympic hurdler (1960).
- Derek Prince, 88, English biblical scholar and author.
- Jean Pélégri, 83, French writer and professor of literature.
- Robert D. Richtmyer, 92, American physicist, author, and musician.
- Edward Said, 67, Palestinian-American academic, literary critic and political activist, leukemia.
- Freddy Valda, 71, Bolivian footballer (national team) and manager (national team, The Strongest).

=== 25 ===
- Thomas Casey, 82, Australian politician.
- John Clayton, 63, Australian actor, cancer.
- Anthony Durante, 36, American professional wrestler, drug overdose.
- Aqila al-Hashimi, 50, Iraqi politician, member of the Iraqi Governing Council (since 2003), complications from gunshot wounds.
- Birgit Jürgenssen, 54, Austrian photographer, painter, curator and teacher.
- Franco Modigliani, 85, Italian Nobel Prize-winning economist.
- Donald Nicol, 80, English Byzantine scholar.
- Chuba Okadigbo, 61, Nigerian politician, philosopher, academic, writer and political scientist.
- George Plimpton, 76, American author, actor, and socialite, heart attack.
- Yuri Senkevich, 66, Soviet doctor and scientist, heart failure.
- Josef Wagner, 87, Swiss cyclist.

=== 26 ===
- Olle Anderberg, 84, Swedish wrestler and Olympian (1948, 1952, 1956).
- Inday Badiday, 59, Filipino TV host and journalist, multiple organ failure.
- Władysław Kozaczuk, 79, Polish Army colonel and intelligence historian.
- Shawn Lane, 40, American guitarist and composer, lung disease.
- Robert Palmer, 54, British singer ("Addicted to Love"), heart attack.
- Robert Raymond, 81, Australian television pioneer.
- David Williams, 77, Welsh advertising executive and crime writer.

=== 27 ===
- Red Barbary, 83, American baseball player (Washington Senators).
- Tom Bateman, 80, Australian politician.
- Emilio Bottecchia, 69, Italian racing cyclist.
- Tom Brennan, 81, American ice hockey player (Boston Bruins).
- Hamidullah Burki, 82, Pakistani Olympic field hockey player (1948).
- Paul Burlison, 74, American rockabilly guitarist and a founding member of The Rock and Roll Trio, cancer.
- Olive Cotton, 92, Australian modernist photographer.
- Fay Helm, 94, American film actress.
- Nawabzada Nasrullah Khan, 86, Pakistani politician, heart attack.
- Bill Koll, 80, American wrestler and Olympian (1948).
- Şevki Koru, 90, Turkish Olympic long-distance runner (1948).
- Jean Lucas, 86, French racing driver.
- Donald J. Mitchell, 80, American politician and member of the United States House of Representatives for New York.
- Gilles Morda, 57, French Olympic bobsledder (1972).
- Donald O'Connor, 78, American actor (Singin' in the Rain, Yes Sir, That's My Baby), singer and dancer, Emmy winner (1954), heart attack.
- Wendy Wyland, 38, American diver and Olympian (1984).
- Masahiro Yoshimura, 66, Japanese Olympic swimmer (1956).

=== 28 ===
- Knud Albjerg, 73, Danish Olympic canoeist (1952).
- Proinsias Mac Aonghusa, 70, Irish journalist, writer, and TV presenter.
- Dany Bébel-Gisler, 68, Guadeloupean sociolinguist, ethnologist and author, preservationist of Creole languages, heart attack.
- Bob Emerick, 90, American football player (Detroit Lions, Cleveland Rams).
- Christopher Foxley-Norris, 86, British Air Chief Marshal.
- Althea Gibson, 76, African-American tennis player, respiratory failure.
- Cork Hubbert, 51, American film and television actor, diabetes.
- Elia Kazan, 94, Turkish-born American film director (A Streetcar Named Desire, On the Waterfront, East of Eden), Oscar winner (1948, 1955).
- George Odlum, 69, Saint Lucian politician, pancreatic cancer.
- Ephraim Oshry, 94–95, Lithuanian-American Orthodox rabbi, author and Holocaust-survivor.
- Marshall Rosenbluth, 76, American academic and plasma physicist.

=== 29 ===
- Lubor Tokoš, 80, Czech actor.
- Wesley Tuttle, 85, American country music singer.
- Raoul Gregory Vitale, 75, Syrian musicologist .
- Beatrice Blyth Whiting, 89, American anthropologist, a pioneer in the comparative study of child development.

=== 30 ===
- Yusuf Bey, 67, American Black Muslim activist and leader, cancer.
- Bjørn Cook, 86, Norwegian wrestler and Olympian (1948).
- Ronnie Dawson, 64, American rockabilly singer, guitarist and drummer, esophageal cancer.
- Oreste Del Buono, 80, Italian author, journalist, translator, literary critic and screenwriter.
- Eddie Gladden, 65, American jazz drummer.
- John Hawkesworth, 82, English television/film producer and writer.
- Marie Hoesly, 86, American Olympic gymnast (1952).
- Robert Kardashian, 59, American criminal defense lawyer, father of Kim, Khloé and Kourtney Kardashian, esophageal cancer.
- Iraklis Klangas, 76, Greek Olympic rower (1948, 1952).
- Michel Parent, 79, French Olympic sailor (1956).
