= Cevdet =

Cevdet is a Turkish form of the Arabic name Jawdat. It is spelt variously in the Balkans as Dževdet, Djevdet or Dzhevdet. It may refer to:

== Given name ==
- Cevdet Bey (1878–1955), governor of the Van vilayet of the Ottoman Empire
- Cevdet Can (born 1969), Turkish alpine skier
- Cevdet Caner (born 1973), Austrian businessman
- Cevdet Dermenci (1918–1985), Soviet Crimean Tatar battalion commander
- Cevdet Erek (born 1974), Turkish artist and musician
- Cevdet Kerim İncedayı (1893–1951), Turkish army officer, politician and author
- Cevdet Kılıçlar (1972–2010), Turkish journalist and photographer
- Cevdet Mehmet Kosemen (born 1984), Turkish artist and author
- Cevdet Döğer (1977–2011), also known as Abdulla Kurd, Kurdish Islamist militant
- Cevdet Sekerbegović (born 1955), Bosnian footballer
- Cevdet Sümer (1922–?), Turkish equestrian
- Cevdet Sunay (1899–1982), Turkish army officer
- Cevdet Yılmaz (born 1967), Turkish politician

People with the Balkan spelling of the name include:

- Djevdet Bey (1878–1955), Albanian Ottoman governor
- Dzhevdet Chakarov (born 1960), Bulgarian politician
- Dževdet Mustagrudić (1923–1944), Yugoslav footballer and partisan
- Dževdet Šainovski (born 1973), Macedonian footballer and manager

== Middle name ==
- Ahmet Cevat Emre (1876–1961), Turkish journalist and linguist
- Ahmet Cevdet Oran (1862–1935), Turkish journalist
- Melih Cevdet Anday (1915–2002), Turkish writer

== Surname ==
- Abdullah Cevdet (1869–1932), Ottoman intellectual and medical doctor
- Ahmed Cevdet Pasha (1822–1895), Ottoman statesman

== Fictional characters ==
- Cevdet, main character in Turkish television drama Vatanım Sensin

== See also ==
- Xhevdet, the Albanian spelling of the name
