= Jesús Rivas =

Jesús Rivas may refer to:

- Jesús Rivas (equestrian)
- Jesús Rivas (footballer)
