= Shooting at the 1956 Summer Olympics – Men's trap =

Olympic sport shooting event

Men's trap at the Games of the XVI Olympiad
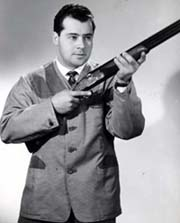
- Gold medalist Galliano Rossini
- Venue: Melbourne, Australia
- Dates: 29 November - 1 December 1956
- Competitors: 32 from 18 nations
- Winning score: 195 OR

Medalists
1st place, gold medalist(s)		Galliano Rossini	Italy
2nd place, silver medalist(s)		Adam Smelczyński	Poland
3rd place, bronze medalist(s)		Alessandro Ciceri	Italy

The men's trap was a shooting sports event held as part of the Shooting at the 1956 Summer Olympics programme. It was the seventh appearance of the event. The competition was held from 29 November to 1 December 1956 at the shooting ranges in Melbourne. 32 shooters from 18 nations competed. Nations were limited to two shooters each. The event was won by Galliano Rossini of Italy, with his countryman Alessandro Ciceri taking bronze. Between the two Italians was Adam Smelczyński of Poland, earning silver. They were the first medals in the men's trap for both nations. Ciceri had to win a three-way shoot-off for the bronze medal against the Soviet pair, Nikolay Mogilevsky and Yury Nikandrov; his win in that shoot-off made the men's trap the only shooting event in 1956 with no Soviets on the podium.

== Background ==
This was the seventh appearance of the men's ISSF Olympic trap event. The event was held at every Summer Olympics from 1896 to 1924 (except 1904, when no shooting events were held) and from 1952 to 2016. As with most shooting events, it was nominally open to women from 1968 to 1980; the trap remained open to women through 1992. Very few women participated these years. The event returned to being men-only for 1996, though the new double trap had separate events for men and women that year. In 2000, a separate women's event was added and it has been contested at every Games since. There was also a men's team trap event held four times from 1908 to 1924.

Five of the top 10 shooters from the 1952 Games returned: silver medalist Knut Holmqvist and bronze medalist Hans Liljedahl of Sweden, fourth-place finisher František Čapek of Czechoslovakia, sixth-place finisher Ioannis Koutsis of Greece, and seventh-place finisher Galliano Rossini of Italy. Rossini had taken silver at the 1954 World Championships, behind his fellow Italian Cesare Merlo; Merlo did not compete in Melbourne (with Alessandro Ciceri joining Rossini on the Italian squad). World bronze medalist Hans Aasnaes of Norway did compete.

Australia, Colombia, Japan, Malaya, the Philippines, and Venezuela each made their debut in the event. Great Britain made its seventh appearance, the only nation to have competed at each edition of the event to that point.

== Competition format ==
The competition used the 200-target format introduced with the return of trap to the Olympics in 1952. The courses were changed somewhat however; in 1956, there were three courses of 75, 75, and 50. Each series consisted of 25 targets (that is, 3 series on the first day, 3 series on the second day, and 2 series on the third day.) A 25-target shoot-off would be used as necessary to break ties for medals.

== Records ==
Prior to this competition, the existing world and Olympic records were as follows.

World record				
Olympic record	George Genereux (CAN)	192	Helsinki, Finland	25–26 July 1952

Galliano Rossini broke the Olympic record with a 195-hit total.

== Schedule ==
Date	Time	Round
Thursday, 29 November 1956	9:00	Course 1
Friday, 30 November 1956	9:00	Course 2
Saturday, 1 December 1956	9:00	Course 3

== Results ==
Rossini took an early lead, hitting 74 of the 75 targets on the first day. Mogilevsky was close behind at 73, with Ciceri and Nikandrov at 71 and Smelczyński at 70. Čapek had 69.

Smelczyński had the best second day, hitting 73 of 75. Rossini and the two Soviets each hit 71; Ciceri managed only 69. This made for a tight group at the top after two days: Rossini at 145, Mogilesvky at 144, Smelczyński at 143, Nikandrov at 142, and Ciceri at 140. Čapek shot 69 again, staying close to the lead group at 138 while a substantial gap grew between him and the rest of the pack.

The third day went to the Italian pair. Rossini was perfect, hitting 50 of 50 targets to ensure nobody could catch him for the gold medal. Ciceri also did well, scoring 48. Smelczyński had 47, Nikandrov 46, and Mogilevsky 45. Smelczyński's total of 190 was good for silver, 5 points behind Rossini but 2 ahead of the other three men, who finished in a tie for third at 188. Čapek's 49 was the second-best total of the day, but not enough to catch the lead 5; he finished in 6th at 187, one point out of the shoot-off for bronze. That shoot-off was won by Ciceri at 24 of 25 targets; Mogilevsky hit 23 to take fourth and Nikandrov scored 22 to finish in fifth.

Rank	Shooter	Nation	Total
1st place, gold medalist(s)	Galliano Rossini	Italy	195
2nd place, silver medalist(s)	Adam Smelczyński	Poland	190
3rd place, bronze medalist(s)	Alessandro Ciceri	Italy	188
4	Nikolay Mogilevsky	Soviet Union	188
5	Yury Nikandrov	Soviet Union	188
6	František Čapek	Czechoslovakia	187
7	Knut Holmqvist	Sweden	178
8	Hans Liljedahl	Sweden	177
9	John Bryant	Australia	176
10	Robert Pignard	France	176
11	Hans Aasnæs	Norway	176
12	Ioannis Koutsis	Greece	175
13	Franco Mignini	Venezuela	172
14	Michel Prévost	France	171
15	Zygmunt Kiszkurno	Poland	170
16	Juan Gindre	Argentina	170
17	Earl Caldwell	Canada	169
18	Joe Wheater	Great Britain	168
19	Raúl Olivo	Venezuela	165
20	Clement Mudford	Australia	164
21	Ernest Fear	Great Britain	162
22	William Pietersz	Colombia	155
23	Tokusaburo Iwata	Japan	155
24	Enrique Beech	Philippines	152
25	Igor Treybal	Czechoslovakia	148
26	Federico Valle	Puerto Rico	147
27	León Bozzi	Argentina	146
28	Moe Fu Kiat	Malaya	145
29	Liew Foh Sin	Malaya	140
30	Ujitoshi Konomi	Japan	140
31	Fernando Jiménez	Puerto Rico	126
32	Frank Opsal	Canada	118
