= João Azevedo =

João Azevedo may refer to:

- João Azevedo (footballer) (1915–1991), Portuguese footballer
- João Azevedo (equestrian) (born 1921), Portuguese equestrian
- João Azevedo (sport shooter) (born 1984), Portuguese sport shooter
- João Azevedo (Portuguese politician) (born 1974), Portuguese politician
- João Azevêdo (Brazilian politician) (born 1953), Brazilian politician, governor of Paraíba (2019–present)
