= Budil =

Budil is a surname. Notable people with the surname include:

- Eduard Budil (1924–2015), Austrian equestrian
- Kimberly S. Budil, American physicist
