= Calmon (surname) =

Calmon is a Portuguese surname. Notable people with the surname include:

- Antônio Calmon (born 1945), Brazilian telenovela writer
- Eliana Calmon (born 1944), Brazilian jurist and magistrate
- Georges Calmon (1919–1989), French equestrian
- Patric Calmon (born 1994) Brazilian footballer
