= Earl Caldwell =

Earl Caldwell may refer to:

- Earl Caldwell (baseball)
- Earl Caldwell (journalist)
- Earl Caldwell (sport shooter)
