= Enrique Tovar =

Enrique Tovar may refer to:

- Enrique Tovar Ávalos, Mexican film director
- Enrique Tovar (boxer) (born 1935), Venezuelan boxer
