= Mudford (surname) =

Mudford is a surname. Notable people with the surname include:

- Clement Mudford (1915–1977), Australian sports shooter
- Grant Mudford (born 1944), Australian photographer
- Ken Mudford (1923–2004), motorcycle road racer from New Zealand
- Phyllis Mudford King (1905–2006), English tennis player
- William Mudford (1782–1848), English writer and journalist
- W. H. Mudford (1839–1916), English newspaper editor

Fictional characters:

- Colin Mudford, the main character in the novel Two Weeks with the Queen (1990)
- Luke Mudford, brother of the above
