= Puerto Rico at the 1956 Summer Olympics =

- IOC code: PUR
- NOC: Puerto Rico Olympic Committee

in Melbourne/Stockholm
- Competitors: 10 in 2 sports
- Flag bearer: Daniel Cintrón
- Medals: Gold 0 Silver 0 Bronze 0 Total 0

Summer Olympics appearances (overview)
- 1948; 1952; 1956; 1960; 1964; 1968; 1972; 1976; 1980; 1984; 1988; 1992; 1996; 2000; 2004; 2008; 2012; 2016; 2020; 2024

Puerto Rico competed at the 1956 Summer Olympics in Melbourne, Australia. This was the nation's third appearance at the Summer Olympics after its debut in 1948. Ten competitors, all men, took part in nine events in two sports.

== History ==
The preparations for these games were rife with political issues. Puerto Rico carried its flag and played its anthem for the first time in an Olympic opening ceremony, competing as a separate nation than the United States. Julio Enrique Monagas reported the ongoing process to governor Luis Muñoz Marín.

== Athletics ==
Men's Pole Vault

- Rolando Cruz

== Shooting ==
Three shooters represented Puerto Rico in 1956.

Men

Athlete	Event	Final	
Athlete	Event	Score	Rank
Miguel Emmanuelli	25 m pistol	563	14
Federico Valle	Trap	147	26
Fernando Jiménez	Trap	126	31
