= Sümer =

Sümer is a Turkish name. Notable people with the name include:

== Surname ==
- Adalet Sümer (1929–2020), Turkish novelist and playwright
- Cevdet Sümer (1922–?), Turkish equestrian
- Fahri Sümer (born 1958), Turkish boxer
- Özkan Sümer (1940–2020), Turkish football player and coach

== Given name ==
- Sümer Koçak (1961–2020), Turkish wrestler
- Sümer Oral (born 1938), Turkish politician
- Sümer Tilmaç (1948–2015), Turkish actor

== See also ==
- Sümer, Mardin, a town in Dargeçit district of Mardin Province, Turkey
- Sumer (disambiguation)
