= Koichi Kawaguchi =

Japanese equestrian

Personal information
- Nationality: Japanese
- Born: 12 March 1913; Mie, Japan
- Died: 2004

Sport
- Sport: Equestrian

Koichi Kawaguchi (12 March 1913 – 2004) was a Japanese equestrian. He competed in the individual jumping event at the 1956 Summer Olympics.
