= León Bozzi =

Argentine sports shooter

Personal information
- Born: 17 June 1928
- Died: 16 March 1987 (aged 58)

Sport
- Sport: Sports shooting

León Bozzi (17 June 1928 – 16 March 1987) was an Argentine sports shooter. He competed in the trap event at the 1956 Summer Olympics, where he finished 28th.
