= Fyodor Metelkov =

Russian equestrian

Personal information
- Nationality: Russian
- Born: 4 July 1934; Kostroma, Russia
- Died: March 2013

Sport
- Sport: Equestrian

Fyodor Metelkov (4 July 1934 – March 2013) was a Russian equestrian. He competed in the individual jumping event at the 1960 Summer Olympics.
