= Min Gwan-gi =

South Korean equestrian

Personal information
- Nationality: South Korean
- Born: 26 June 1942 (age 83) Seoul, South Korea

Sport
- Sport: Equestrian

Min Gwan-gi (Min Kwan-ki, Korean: 민관기; born 26 June 1942) is a South Korean equestrian. He competed in the individual jumping event at the 1960 Summer Olympics.
