= Robert Pignard =

French sports shooter (1902-1964)

Personal information
- Full name: Robert Marie Cyrille Pignard
- Born: 13 November 1902 Saint-Lô, France
- Died: 15 November 1964 (aged 62) Arradon, France

Sport
- Sport: Football and Sports shooting

Robert Pignard (13 November 1902 – 15 November 1964) was a French football player and sports shooter. In football, he most notably played six years for Stade Malherbe Caen. In shooting, he competed in the trap event at the 1956 Summer Olympics.
