= Bert Jacobs (equestrian) =

Australian equestrian

Personal information
- Full name: Albert Frank Jacobs
- Nationality: Australian
- Born: 23 September 1929
- Died: 1994 (aged 64–65)

Sport
- Sport: Equestrian

Bert Jacobs (23 September 1929 – 1994) was an Australian equestrian. He competed in the individual jumping event at the 1956 Summer Olympics.
