= Liew Foh Sin =

Malaysian sports shooter

Personal information
- Born: 1898

Sport
- Sport: Sports shooting

Liew Foh Sin (born 1897, date of death unknown) was a Malaysian sports shooter. He competed in the trap event at the 1956 Summer Olympics.
