= Adam Smelczyński =

Polish sport shooter (1930–2021)

Personal information
- Born: 14 September 1930 Częstochowa, Poland
- Died: 14 June 2021 (aged 90)
Medal record
Men's shooting
Representing Poland
Olympic Games
Silver medal – second place	1956 Melbourne	Trap Shooting

Adam Smelczyński (14 September 1930 – 14 June 2021) was a Polish trap shooter who competed at six Olympics between 1956 and 1976, winning one silver medal in 1956. He was born in Częstochowa, Poland.

Along with Bill McMillan, he was the second shooter to compete at six Olympics, after Frans Lafortune (the Theofilakis brothers Alexandros and Ioannis competed at six Olympics only if the unofficial 1906 Games are counted). He came third in trap shooting at the World Championships in 1967. He won the European trap shooting championships in 1972 and 1976, and came third in 1974 and 1975.

== See also ==
- List of athletes with the most appearances at Olympic Games
