= Nikolay Mogilevsky =

Soviet sports shooter (born 1926)

Personal information
- Born: 1926

Sport
- Sport: Sports shooting

Nikolay Mogilevsky (born 1926) is a Soviet former sports shooter. He competed in the trap event at the 1956 Summer Olympics.
