= Bedri Böke =

Turkish equestrian

Personal information
- Nationality: Turkish
- Born: 1920; Istanbul, Turkey
- Died: 12 September 1974 (aged 53–54)

Sport
- Sport: Equestrian

Bedri Böke (1920 – 12 September 1974) was a Turkish equestrian who competed in the individual jumping and team jumping events at the 1956 Summer Olympics.
