= Ernesto Hartkopf =

Argentine equestrian

Personal information
- Born: 12 April 1928; Buenos Aires, Argentina
- Died: 26 December 2009 (aged 81); Villa Mercedes, Argentina

Sport
- Sport: Equestrian

Ernesto Hartkopf (12 April 1928 – 26 December 2009) was an Argentine equestrian. He competed in the individual jumping event at the 1960 Summer Olympics.
