= Dawn Wofford =

British equestrian (1936–2015)

Personal information
- Nationality: British
- Born: 23 May 1936; Kidderminster, Worcestershire, England
- Died: 12 June 2015 (aged 79); Studley, Warwickshire, England

Sport
- Sport: Equestrianism

Dawn Palethorpe Wofford (23 May 1936 – 12 June 2015) was a British equestrian. She competed at the 1960 Summer Olympics and tied 20th at the final rankings.

== Biography ==
Wofford was born in Kidderminster, Worcestershire, in 1936, and was brought up in Blakedown. She learned to ride from a very early age, and was also a swimmer and played tennis. At the age of two, she joined the Pony Club and was the runner-up in the 1951 Junior Show Jumper of the Year. She attended Edgbaston Ladies College and the Birmingham School of Music. In 1954, Wofford was the Ladies National Champion. In 1955 and 1956, she won the Queen Elizabeth II Cup at the Royal International Horse Show. In 1959, she won second place in the German Grand Prix Tournament held in the Halls of Westphalia with her horse Hollandia. She married her husband, Warren, in secret in 1957.

Wofford was selected to take part at the 1956 Summer Olympics in Stockholm, but did not compete. At the 1960 Summer Olympics in Rome, Wofford competed in the individual jumping event, where she tied for 20th place. Just prior to the Olympics, Wofford won a silver medal at the European Women's Championships in Copenhagen.

Following the Olympics, Wofford retired from show jumping. In 1991, Wofford became the first ever female chairperson of the Pony Club. The following year, she re-wrote the Manual of Horsemanship, the key document of the Pony Club.

Her brother-in-laws Jimmy and John both competed at the Olympics, as did her father-in-law John W. Wofford. In 2013, Wofford was diagnosed with bone cancer, and she died in June 2015 at the age of 79.
