= John Bryant (sport shooter) =

Australian sports shooter

Personal information
- Born: 26 November 1930 (age 95)
- Died: 31 May 2010 (aged 79)

Sport
- Sport: Sports shooting

John Henry Bryant (26 November 1930 – 31 May 2010) was an Australian sports shooter. He competed in the trap event at the 1956 Summer Olympics.
