= Alfredo Goyeneche =

Spanish equestrian

Personal information
- Full name: Alfredo Goyeneche Moreno
- Nationality: Spanish
- Born: 15 December 1937; San Sebastián, Spain
- Died: 16 March 2002 (aged 64); Madrid, Spain
- Height: 176 cm (5 ft 9 in)
- Weight: 72 kg (159 lb)

Alfredo Goyeneche Moreno (Note: In this Spanish name, the first or paternal surname is Goyeneche and the second or maternal family name is Moreno.) (15 December 1937 – 16 March 2002) was a Spanish equestrian. He competed in the team jumping event at the 1960 Summer Olympics.
