= William Pietersz =

Colombian sport shooter (1925–1992)

Personal information
- Full name: Willem Tell Pietersz
- Born: 18 February 1925 Barranquilla, Colombia
- Died: 24 October 1992 (aged 67) Barranquilla, Colombia

Sport
- Sport: Sports shooting

William Pietersz (18 February 1925 – 24 October 1992) was a Colombian sports shooter. He competed in the trap event at the 1956 Summer Olympics.
