= Jorge Lucardi =

Argentine equestrian

Personal information
- Born: 13 November 1928 Buenos Aires, Argentina
- Died: 22 January 2016 (aged 87)

Sport
- Sport: Equestrian
Medal record
Equestrian
Representing Argentina
Pan American Games
Silver medal – second place	1955 Mexico City	Individual jumping
Silver medal – second place	1955 Mexico City	Team jumping

Jorge Gustavo Lucardi (13 November 1928 – 22 January 2016) was an Argentine equestrian. He competed in the team jumping event at the 1960 Summer Olympics.
