= Jawdat =

Jawdat (also spelled Gawdat in Egyptian Arabic) is a male given name of Arabic origin. Notable people with the name include:

== Gawdat ==
- Gawdat Bahgat (born 1960s), American political scientist
- Gawdat Gabra (born 1947), Egyptian Coptologist
- Gawdat al-Malt (born 1935), Egyptian politician
- Mo Gawdat (born 1967), Egyptian author

== Jawdat ==
- Ali Jawdat al-Aiyubi (1886–1969), Iraqi politician
- Jawdat Ibrahim, Israeli-Arab businessman
- Jawdat Said (1931–2022), Syrian Islamic scholar

== See also ==
- Cevdet, the Turkish form of the name
