= Georges Hernalsteens =

Belgian equestrian

Personal information
- Nationality: Belgian
- Born: 30 June 1937 (age 87); Uccle, Belgium

Sport
- Sport: Equestrian

Georges Hernalsteens (born 30 June 1937) is a Belgian former equestrian. He competed in the individual jumping event at the 1960 Summer Olympics.
