= Daia =

- Commune
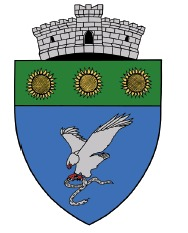
- Coat of arms

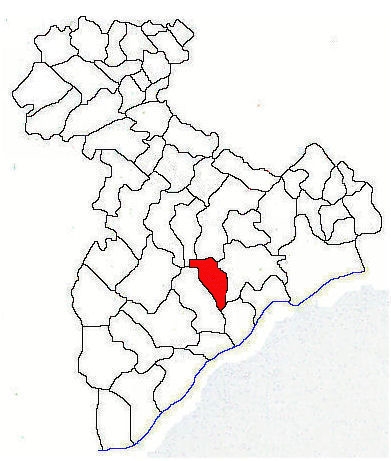
- Location in Giurgiu County

- Location in Romania
- Coordinates: 43°59′40″N 25°59′30″E
- Country: Romania
- County: Giurgiu

Government
  - Mayor (2024–2028): Adrian-Florin Șerban (PNL)
- Area: 63.59 km^{2} (24.55 sq mi)
- Elevation: 52 m (171 ft)
- Population (2021-12-01): 2,361
  - Density: 37/km^{2} (96/sq mi)
- Time zone: EET/EEST (UTC+2/+3)
- Postal code: 87070
- Area code: +(40) 246
- Vehicle reg.: GR
- Website: primaria-daia.ro

Daia is a commune located in Giurgiu County, Muntenia, Romania. It is composed of two villages, Daia and Plopșoru.

Historical population
Year	Pop.	±%
2002	3,138	—
2011	2,851	−9.1%
2021	2,361	−17.2%
Source: Census data

== Natives ==
- Vasile Pinciu (born 1932), equestrian
- Marin Pîrcălabu (born 1952), wrestler
