= Portugal at the 1956 Summer Olympics =

- IOC code: POR
- NOC: Olympic Committee of Portugal

in Melbourne/Stockholm
- Competitors: 11 in 2 sports
- Medals: Gold 0 Silver 0 Bronze 0 Total 0

Summer Olympics appearances (overview)
- 1912; 1920; 1924; 1928; 1932; 1936; 1948; 1952; 1956; 1960; 1964; 1968; 1972; 1976; 1980; 1984; 1988; 1992; 1996; 2000; 2004; 2008; 2012; 2016; 2020; 2024

Flag of the Olympic movement

Portugal competed at the 1956 Summer Olympics in Melbourne, Australia, and Stockholm, Sweden (equestrian events). As a partial support to the Dutch-led boycott, Portuguese athletes participated under the Olympic flag instead of the national flag.

A total delegation of twelve competitors (five in Melbourne, seven in Stockholm) participated in two sports, however no medals were conquered by this nation.

== Results by event ==
=== Equestrian ===
Men's Individual Dressage:

- António Pereira de Almeida — 12th (743 marks)

Men's Individual Eventing:

- Álvaro Sabbo — eliminated
- Fernando Marques Cavaleiro — 34th (−657,24 points)
- Joaquim Duarte Silva — 29th (−349,55 points)

Men's Team Eventing:

- Álvaro Sabbo, Fernando Marques Cavaleiro and Joaquim Duarte Silva — eliminated

Men's Individual Jumping:

- Henrique Alves Calado — 7th (16 marks)
- João Azevedo — eliminated
- Rodrigo da Silveira — eliminated

Men's Team Jumping:

- Henrique Alves Calado, João Azevedo and Rodrigo da Silveira — 11th - 20th

=== Sailing ===
Men's Dragon:

- Bernardo Mendes de Almeida (helm), Carlos Rogenmoser Lourenço and Serge Marquis — 13th (2002 points)

Men's Star:

- Duarte de Almeida Bello (helm) and José Bustorff Silva — 4th (3825 points)

== Officials ==
- Fernando Pais (chief of mission)
