= Moe Fu Kiat =

Malaysian sports shooter (born 1926)

Personal information
- Born: 1926

Sport
- Sport: Sports shooting

Moe Fu Kiat (born 1926) is a Malaysian former sports shooter. He competed in the trap event at the 1956 Summer Olympics.
