= Alessandro Ciceri (sport shooter) =

Italian sport shooter (1932–1990)

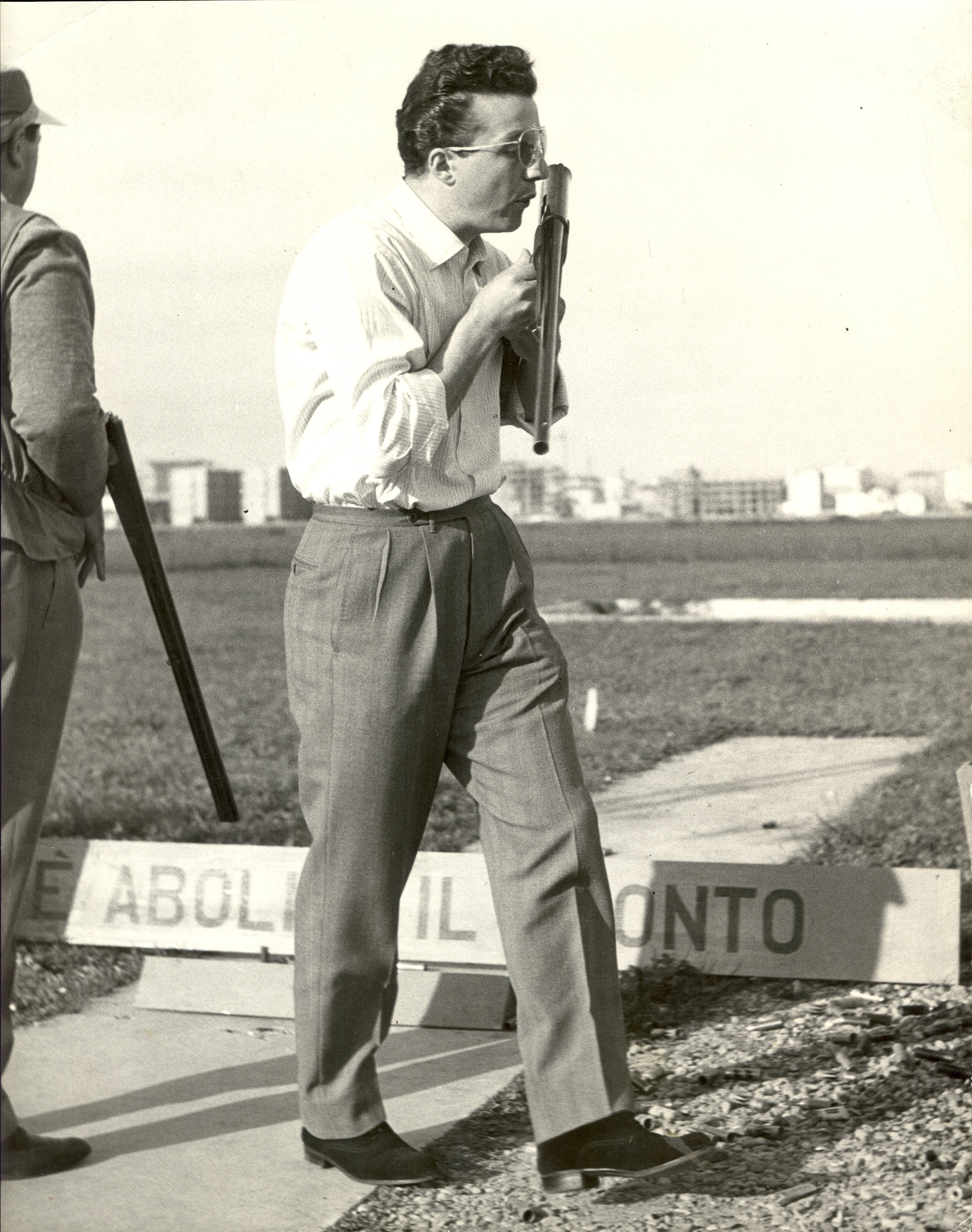

Personal information
- Born: 10 February 1932
- Died: 5 September 1990 (aged 58)
Medal record
Men's shooting
Representing Italy
Olympic Games
Bronze medal – third place	1956 Melbourne	Trap

Alessandro Ciceri (10 February 1932 – 5 September 1990) was an Italian sport shooter who competed in the 1956 Summer Olympics.

== See also ==
- Trap European Champions
