= Frank Opsal =

Canadian sports shooter

Personal information
- Born: 18 November 1928 Vancouver, British Columbia, Canada
- Died: 5 April 2008 (aged 79) Vancouver, British Columbia, Canada

Sport
- Sport: Sports shooting

Frank Opsal (18 November 1928 – 5 April 2008) was a Canadian sports shooter. He competed in the trap event at the 1956 Summer Olympics.
