= Gustaf de Geer =

Swedish equestrian

Personal information
- Nationality: Swedish
- Born: 22 November 1920; Stockholm, Sweden
- Died: 23 September 2003 (aged 82); Stockholm, Sweden

Sport
- Sport: Equestrian

Gustaf de Geer (22 November 1920 – 23 September 2003) was a Swedish equestrian. He competed in the team jumping event at the 1960 Summer Olympics.
