= Maurizio Romano =

Italian film, television, voice actor (1966–2003)

- Born: 9 March 1966; Cassino, Italy
- Died: 20 September 2003 (aged 37); Vizzolo Predabissi, Italy
- Occupations: film actor; television actor; voice actor
- Years active: 1990–2003
- Relatives: Laura Romano (sister)

Maurizio Romano (9 March 1966 – 20 September 2003) was an Italian film, television and voice actor.

== Biography ==
Born in Cassino, Romano began his career in the 1990s. He was heavily active in his chosen field as a voice actor during that time. He was known for providing the Italian voice of Lionel Hutz in The Simpsons. He also voiced Professor Frink from his debut appearance until the fourth season of The Simpsons.

Romano dubbed certain actors in at least one or two of their movies such as Ben Affleck, John Leguizamo and Jeremy Davies. He was also the Italian voice of Tuvok in the first season of Star Trek: Voyager.

As an actor, Romano appeared in an episode of the Italian drama show Una donna per amico directed by Rossella Izzo in 1998. His career as an actor was quite short-lived.

=== Personal life ===
Romano was the older brother of voice actress Laura Romano.

==== Death ====
On 20 September 2003, Romano was killed in a car crash. The incident took place in Vizzolo Predabissi near Milan. He was 37 years old.

== Filmography ==
- Una donna per amico - television series (1998)
- The House of Chicken (2001)

== Dubbing roles ==
=== Animation ===
- Lionel Hutz and Professor Frink (seasons 2–4) in The Simpsons
- Cyberdramon in Digimon Tamers

=== Live action ===
- Shannon Hamilton in Mallrats
- Tybalt in William Shakespeare's Romeo + Juliet
- Michael Boxer in S.W.A.T.
- Wild Bill Hickok in The Young Riders
- J.D. Darius in Baywatch
- Seamus in Equilibrium
- Brian Lawrence in Twister
- Joe Haskell / Peter Bradford in Dark Shadows
- Julius Caesar in Xena: Warrior Princess
- Buzz Thomas in Best Men
- Noah in 28 Days Later
- Frank Stolte in Alarm für Cobra 11 – Die Autobahnpolizei
- Jimmy Wilder in Independence Day
- Charles in Swingers
- Calvin Andrews in Shanghai Noon
- Jesse Ryan in The Rage: Carrie 2
- Adam Louder in Models Inc.
- Ronnie Gibson in The Recruit

== See also ==
- List of Italian actors
