= Carlos Monteverde =

Venezuelan sports shooter (1919–2000)

Personal information
- Born: 2 September 1919 Caracas, Venezuela
- Died: 19 July 2000 (aged 80) Caracas, Venezuela

Sport
- Sport: Sports shooting

Carlos Monteverde (2 September 1919 – 19 July 2000) was a Venezuelan sports shooter. He competed at the 1952 Summer Olympics, 1956 Summer Olympics and 1960 Summer Olympics.
