= Domingo Rivas =

Venezuelan cyclist (1933–2020)

Personal information
- Born: 29 March 1933
- Died: 29 August 2020 (aged 87)

Cycling career
- Sport: Cycling

Domingo Rivas (29 March 1933 – 29 August 2020) was a Venezuelan racing cyclist. He competed in the three events at the 1956 Summer Olympics.
