= Arsenio Chirinos =

Venezuelan cyclist (1934–2015)

Personal information
- Born: 14 December 1934 Caracas, Venezuela
- Died: 13 October 2015 (aged 80) Barcelona, Venezuela

Cycling career
- Sport: Cycling

Arsenio Chirinos (14 December 1934 – 13 October 2015) was a Venezuelan cyclist. He competed at the 1956 Summer Olympics and the 1960 Summer Olympics.
