= Franco Mignini =

Venezuelan sports shooter

Personal information
- Born: 25 October 1921 Perugia, Italy
- Died: 14 June 1987 (aged 65) Caracas, Venezuela

Sport
- Sport: Sports shooting

Franco Mignini (25 October 1921 – 14 June 1987) was a Venezuelan sports shooter. He competed in the trap event at the 1956 Summer Olympics.
