= Martin Riesen =

Swiss ice hockey player

- Born: 8 July 1926; Switzerland
- Died: 13 September 2003 (aged 77)
- Position: Goaltender
- National team: Switzerland
- Playing career: 1956–1956

Martin Riesen (8 July 1926 – 13 September 2003) was a Swiss ice hockey goaltender who represented the Swiss national team at the 1956 Winter Olympics.
