= Raúl Olivo (sport shooter) =

Venezuelan sports shooter (1921–2018)

Personal information
- Born: 6 June 1921
- Died: 17 January 2018 (aged 96)

Sport
- Sport: Sports shooting

Raúl Olivo (6 June 1921 – 17 January 2018) was a Venezuelan sports shooter. He competed in the trap event at the 1956 Summer Olympics.
