= Enrique Lucca =

Venezuelan sports shooter (1923–2021)

Personal information
- Born: 23 December 1923 Caracas, Venezuela
- Died: 15 September 2021 (aged 97) Caracas, Venezuela

Sport
- Sport: Sports shooting
Medal record
Representing Venezuela
Pan American Games
Bronze medal – third place	1963 São Paulo	50 m rifle prone team

Enrique Lucca (23 December 1923 – 15 September 2021) was a Venezuelan sports shooter. He competed in the 50 metre rifle, prone event at the 1956 Summer Olympics. Lucca died in Caracas on 15 September 2021, at the age of 97.
