= Georges Calmon =

French equestrian (1910–1989)

Personal information
- Nationality: French
- Born: 26 May 1910 Ille-sur-Têt, Pyrénées-Orientales, France
- Died: 25 October 1989 (aged 79) Équemauville, Calvados, France

Sport
- Sport: Equestrian

Georges Jean André Calmon (26 May 1910 – 25 October 1989) was a French equestrian. He was a champion of France in 1953. He competed in two events at the 1956 Summer Olympics held in Stockholm, Team jumping and Individual jumping.
