= Antonio Montilla =

Venezuelan cyclist (1935–2021)

Personal information
- Born: 1 November 1935 Trujillo, Venezuela
- Died: 11 September 2021 (aged 85)

Cycling career
- Sport: Cycling

Antonio Montilla (1 November 1935 – 11 September 2021) was a Venezuelan cyclist. He competed in the three events at the 1956 Summer Olympics.

Montilla died on 11 September 2021, at the age of 85.
