= Franco Cacioni =

Venezuelan cyclist (1933–1995)

Personal information
- Born: 6 January 1933 Rome, Italy
- Died: 12 April 1995 (aged 62)

Cycling career
- Sport: Cycling

Franco Cacioni (6 January 1933 – 12 April 1995) was a Venezuelan cyclist. He competed in the three events at the 1956 Summer Olympics.
