= Carlos Rodríguez (boxer) =

Venezuelan boxer (born 1939)

Personal information
- Nationality: Venezuelan
- Born: 15 March 1939 (age 87)

Sport
- Sport: Boxing

Carlos Rodríguez (born 15 March 1939) is a Venezuelan boxer. He competed in the men's light welterweight event at the 1956 Summer Olympics.
