= José Bernal (sport shooter) =

Venezuelan sports shooter (born 1927)

Personal information
- Full name: José Ignacio Bernal Rugeles
- Born: 1 February 1927 Rubio, Venezuela

Sport
- Sport: Sports shooting

José Ignacio Bernal Rugeles (born 1 February 1927) is a Venezuelan former sports shooter. He competed in the 50 metre pistol event at the 1956 Summer Olympics.
