= Fernando Jiménez (sport shooter) =

Puerto Rican sports shooter

Personal information
- Full name: Fernando Jiménez
- Born: 11 May 1905 Vega Baja, Puerto Rico
- Died: 22 October 1987 (aged 82) Caguas, Puerto Rico

Sport
- Sport: Sports shooting

Fernando Jiménez (11 May 1905 – 22 October 1987) was a Puerto Rican sports shooter. He competed in the trap event at the 1956 Summer Olympics. He also won a silver medal at the 1966 Central American and Caribbean Games.
