= Juan Llabot =

Venezuelan sports shooter (born 1912)

Personal information
- Born: 29 June 1912 Córdoba, Argentina
- Died: 13 November 1995 (aged 83) Venezuela

Sport
- Sport: Sports shooting

Juan Llabot (29 June 1912 – 13 November 1995) was a Venezuelan sports shooter. He competed at the 1956 Summer Olympics and the 1968 Summer Olympics.
