= Hamidullah Burki =

Pakistani field hockey player (1920–2003)

Personal information
- Full name: Hamidullah Khan Burki
- Nationality: British Indian (1920–1947); Pakistani (1947–2003)
- Born: 10 November 1920 Jalandhar, British India
- Died: 27 September 2003 (aged 82) Islamabad, Pakistan
- Resting place: H-8 Graveyard, Islamabad, Pakistan

Sport
- Sport: Field hockey

Hamidullah Khan Burki (10 November 1920 – 27 September 2003) was a Pakistani field hockey player and later journalist. He competed in the men's tournament at the 1948 Summer Olympics.

Prior to Pakistan gaining independence, he had served with the Royal Indian Navy in Burma during the Second World War.
