= Xhevdet =

- Gender: Male

Origin
- Region of origin: Albania

Xhevdet is a predominantly Albanian language masculine given name. Notable people bearing the name Xhevdet include:

- Xhevdet Bajraj (1960–2022), Kosovan poet and screenwriter
- Xhevdet Doda (1906–1944), Kosovan World War II resistance member
- Xhevdet Gela (born 1989), Kosovan-Finnish footballer
- Xhevdet Llumnica (born 1979), Kosovan footballer
- Xhevdet Muriqi (born 1963), Kosovan footballer
- Xhevdet Peci (1955–2022), Kosovan and Yugoslav former boxer
- Xhevdet Picari, Albanian military soldier
- Xhevdet Shabani (born 1986), Kosovan footballer
- Xhevdet Shaqiri (1923–1997), Albanian footballer
