= Dževdet Mustagrudić =

Yugoslav footballer and partisan

Dževdet Mustagrudić - Deta (Podgorica, Kingdom of Yugoslavia, 1923 – Pazarić, Independent State of Croatia, 1944) was a footballer and member of Yugoslav partisans.

== Biography ==
He started playing at 15 years old in 1937 for GSK Balšić Podgorica. With the capitulation of Yugoslavia in the Second World War, he and his family moved to Sarajevo in 1941. He started playing for Đerzelez which competed in Croatian First League. His talent quickly shone through; teammates recalled his ambidextrous dribbling, precise shooting, and exceptional field vision.

At Đerzelez, Mustagrudić became a sensation. In the 1943 season, he scored 26 goals, cementing his reputation as a prolific striker. His standout performance came in a 3–1 victory against Zagreb’s HAŠK on May 21, 1943, where he netted two goals, outclassing his defender, future Yugoslav international Zlatko Čajkovski. Teammates and rivals alike praised his "unstoppable" speed, technical finesse, and ability to dominate matches. His performances drew comparisons to legends like Rajko Mitić, Stjepan Bobek, and Dragoslav Šekularac.

His career nearly derailed in 1943 when a HAŠK defender severely injured him during a match.

=== World War II and death ===
Despite lucrative offers from top clubs, including Građanski Zagreb—who promised his family a café in Zagreb’s city center—Mustagrudić refused to leave. He was scheduled to travel to Zagreb, capital of Independent State of Croatia, a fascist puppet state of Germany, and sign for HŠK Građanski, but he instead chose to enter League of Communist Youth of Yugoslavia. He escaped Sarajevo in September 1944, where he joined partisans on mountain Igman.

On September 27, 1944, during an assault on a German bunker near Pazarić, he was fatally struck by mortar shrapnel. Days after his death, orders arrived to transfer him to Italy to join Hajduk Split’s wartime team—a move that might have spared his life.

=== Legacy ===
Podgorica, now in Montenegro, named a street after him on 8 June 2017.
