= Federico Valle =

Puerto Rican sports shooter

Personal information
- Full name: Federico Valle
- Born: 5 September 1907
- Died: 12 February 1993 (aged 85)

Sport
- Sport: Sports shooting

Federico Valle (5 September 1907 – 12 February 1993) was a Puerto Rican sports shooter. He competed in the trap event at the 1956 Summer Olympics.
