= Earl Caldwell (sport shooter) =

Canadian sports shooter

Personal information
- Born: 27 October 1912 Heward, Saskatchewan, Canada
- Died: 20 July 1983 (aged 70) North Vancouver, Canada

Sport
- Sport: Sports shooting

Earl Caldwell (27 October 1912 – 20 July 1983) was a Canadian sports shooter. He competed in the trap event at the 1956 Summer Olympics.
