= Carlos Crassus =

Venezuelan sports shooter (1920–1984)

Carlos Crassus Moreno
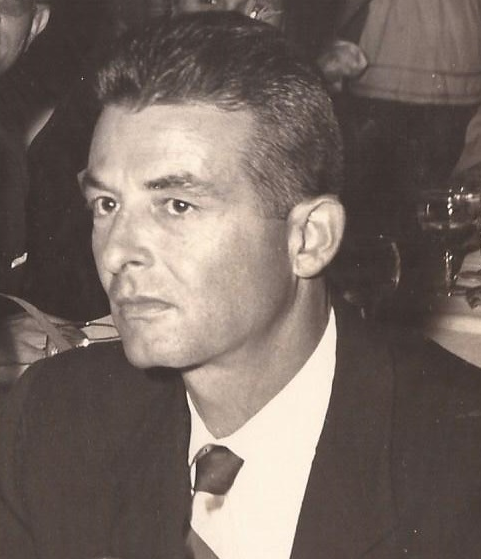

Personal information
- Born: Carlos Crassus Moreno; 6 August 1920 Caracas, Venezuela
- Died: 5 February 1984 (aged 63) Caracas, Venezuela

Sport
- Sport: Sports shooting

Carlos Crassus (6 August 1920 – 5 February 1984) was a Venezuelan sports shooter. He competed at the 1956 Summer Olympics and the 1960 Summer Olympics.
