= Clement Mudford =

Australian sports shooter

Personal information
- Born: 21 January 1915 Malmsbury, Victoria, Australia
- Died: 10 March 1977 (aged 62) Ringwood, Victoria, Australia

Sport
- Sport: Sports shooting

Clement Mudford (21 January 1915 – 10 March 1977) was an Australian sports shooter. He competed in the trap event at the 1956 Summer Olympics.
