= Eduard Budil =

Austrian equestrian (1924–2015)

Personal information
- Nationality: Austrian
- Born: 1 June 1924; Vienna, Austria
- Died: 26 February 2015 (aged 90)

Sport
- Sport: Equestrian

Eduard Budil (1 June 1924 – 26 February 2015) was an Austrian equestrian. He competed in the individual jumping event at the 1960 Summer Olympics.
