= Germán Briceño =

Venezuelan sports shooter (born 1919)

Personal information
- Full name: Germán Enrique Briceño Martínez
- Born: 13 August 1919 Maracaibo, Venezuela

Sport
- Sport: Sports shooting

Germán Briceño (born 13 August 1919, date of death unknown) was a Venezuelan sports shooter. He competed in the 100 metre running deer event at the 1956 Summer Olympics.

Germán Briceño is deceased. He was the brother of fellow Venezuelan shooter Humberto Briceño.
