= Rafael Paullier =

Uruguayan equestrian (1932–c. 1992)

Personal information
- Full name: Rafael Paullier Martínez
- Born: 24 February 1932 Montevideo, Uruguay
- Died: in or before 1992

Sport
- Sport: Equestrian

Rafael Paullier Martínez (24 February 1932 – in or before 1992) was a Uruguayan equestrian. He competed in two events at the 1960 Summer Olympics. Paullier died in or before 1992.
