= Oscar da Silva (equestrian) =

Brazilian equestrian

Personal information
- Born: 20 June 1920; Garanhuns, Brazil
- Died: 7 February 2010 (aged 89); Rio de Janeiro, Brazil

Sport
- Sport: Equestrian

Oscar da Silva (20 June 1920 – 7 February 2010) was a Brazilian equestrian. He competed in two events at the 1960 Summer Olympics.
