= István Suti =

Hungarian equestrian

Personal information
- Born: 23 June 1939 Mindszent, Csongrád, Hungary
- Died: 18 March 2012 (aged 72) Kiskunhalas, Bács-Kiskun, Hungary

Sport
- Sport: Equestrian

István Suti (23 June 1939 – 18 March 2012) was a Hungarian equestrian. He competed at the 1960 Summer Olympics.
