= Mario Leite Neto =

Brazilian equestrian

Personal information
- Born: 10 June 1931; Riachuelo, Brazil
- Died: 1 November 1979 (aged 48)

Sport
- Sport: Equestrian

Mario Leite Neto (10 June 1931 – 1 November 1979) was a Brazilian equestrian. He competed in two events at the 1960 Summer Olympics.
