= Per Fresk =

Swedish equestrian (1932–2019)

Personal information
- Nationality: Swedish
- Born: 20 February 1933 Falun, Romania
- Died: 27 July 2019 (aged 86)

Sport
- Sport: Equestrian

Per Fresk (20 February 1933 – 27 July 2019) was a Swedish equestrian. He competed in two events at the 1960 Summer Olympics.

Fresk died on 27 July 2019, at the age of 86.
