= Yuzo Kageyama =

Japanese equestrian

Personal information
- Nationality: Japanese
- Born: 24 December 1935 (age 89); Tochigi, Japan

Sport
- Sport: Equestrian

Yuzo Kageyama (born 24 December 1935) is a Japanese former equestrian. He competed at the 1960 Summer Olympics and the 1964 Summer Olympics.
