= Vasile Pinciu =

Romanian equestrian

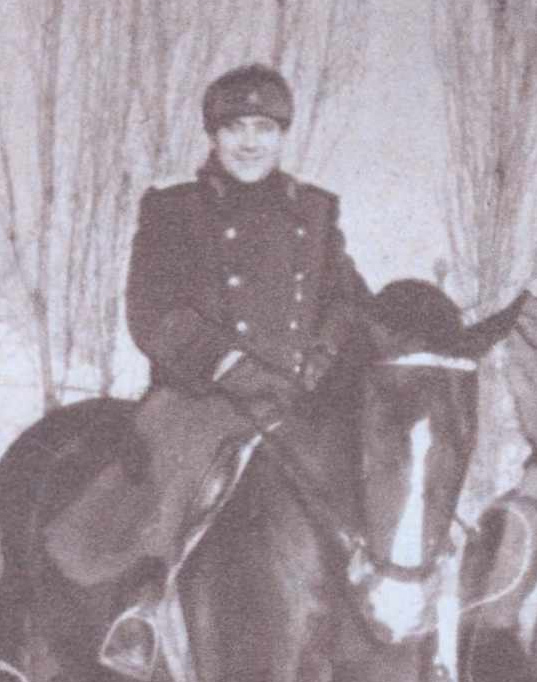
- Pinciu in 1963

Personal information
- Nationality: Romanian
- Born: 9 April 1932 Daia, Romania
- Died: 28 November 2019 (aged 87)

Sport
- Sport: Equestrian

Vasile Pinciu (9 April 1932 – 28 November 2019) was a Romanian equestrian. He competed in two events at the 1960 Summer Olympics.
