= Juan Martínez (equestrian) =

Spanish equestrian (1924–1994)

Personal information
- Nationality: Spanish
- Born: 13 November 1924 Valencia, Spain
- Died: 15 August 1994 (aged 69) Torre de la Horadada, Spain

Sport
- Sport: Equestrian

Juan Martínez (13 November 1924 – 15 August 1994) was a Spanish equestrian. He competed in two events at the 1960 Summer Olympics.
