= Ernest Shabaylo =

Russian equestrian

Personal information
- Nationality: Russian
- Born: 19 December 1931; Ivanovo, Russia
- Died: 11 February 1991 (aged 59)

Sport
- Sport: Equestrian

Ernest Shabaylo (19 December 1931 – 11 February 1991) was a Russian equestrian. He competed in two events at the 1960 Summer Olympics.
