= Enrique Tovar (boxer) =

Venezuelan boxer

Personal information
- Nationality: Venezuelan
- Born: 2 April 1935 (age 89)

Sport
- Sport: Boxing

Enrique Tovar (born 2 April 1935) is a Venezuelan boxer. He competed in the men's welterweight event at the 1956 Summer Olympics.
