= Elwi Gazi =

Egyptian equestrian

Personal information
- Nationality: Egyptian
- Born: April 1929; Tala, Egypt
- Died: 24 June 2012; Cairo, Egypt

Sport
- Sport: Equestrian

Elwi Gazi (April 1929 – 24 June 2012) was an Egyptian equestrian. He competed in two events at the 1960 Summer Olympics.
