= Germán Mailhos =

Uruguayan equestrian

Personal information
- Born: 24 February 1933; Montevideo, Uruguay
- Died: 30 December 2005 (aged 72)

Sport
- Sport: Equestrian

Germán Mailhos (24 February 1933 – 30 December 2005) was a Uruguayan equestrian. He competed in two events at the 1960 Summer Olympics.
