= Wilhelm Stewen =

Finnish equestrian

Personal information
- Nationality: Finnish
- Born: 15 September 1927; Vilppula, Finland
- Died: 10 August 2012 (aged 84); Naantali, Finland

Sport
- Sport: Equestrian

Wilhelm Stewen (15 September 1927 – 10 August 2012) was a Finnish equestrian. He competed in two events at the 1956 Summer Olympics.
