= Imre Karcsú =

Hungarian equestrian (1934–2013)

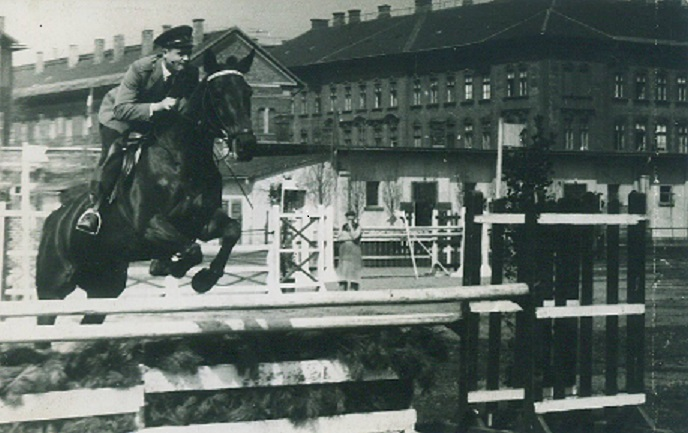
- Karcsú during an event (c. 1960)

Personal information
- Nationality: Hungarian
- Born: 2 February 1934; Kecskemét, Hungary
- Died: 1 October 2013 (aged 79); Komárom, Hungary

Sport
- Sport: Equestrian

Imre Karcsú (2 February 1934 – 1 October 2013) was a Hungarian equestrian. He competed in two events at the 1960 Summer Olympics. Karcsú died in Komárom on 1 October 2013, at the age of 79.
