= Éamon O'Donohoe =

Irish equestrian (born 1970)

Personal information
- Nationality: Irish
- Born: 14 September 1937 (age 89) Galway, Ireland

Sport
- Sport: Equestrian

Éamon O'Donohoe (born 14 September 1937) is an Irish equestrian. He competed in two events at the 1960 Summer Olympics.
