= Sean Daly (equestrian) =

Irish equestrian (1933–1987)

Personal information
- Nationality: Irish
- Born: 12 February 1933 Letterfrack, Ireland
- Died: 14 June 1987 (aged 54)

Sport
- Sport: Equestrian

Sean Daly (12 February 1933 – 14 June 1987) was an Irish equestrian. He competed in two events at the 1960 Summer Olympics.
