= Rodrigo da Silveira =

Portuguese equestrian

Personal information
- Nationality: Portuguese
- Born: 22 November 1920 Estoril, Portugal

Sport
- Sport: Equestrian

Rodrigo da Silveira (born 22 November 1920) was a Portuguese equestrian. He competed in two events at the 1956 Summer Olympics.
