= Kunihiro Ohta =

Japanese equestrian

Personal information
- Nationality: Japanese
- Born: 22 April 1931; Tokyo, Japan

Sport
- Sport: Equestrian

Kunihiro Ohta (born 22 April 1931) is a Japanese former equestrian. He competed at the 1956 Summer Olympics and the 1960 Summer Olympics.
