= Brigitte Schockaert =

Belgian equestrian

Personal information
- Nationality: Belgian
- Born: 23 June 1933 (age 91); Zottegem, Belgium

Sport
- Sport: Equestrian

Brigitte Schockaert (born 23 June 1933) is a Belgian equestrian. She competed at the 1956 Summer Olympics and the 1960 Summer Olympics.
