= Omar El-Hadary =

Egyptian equestrian

Personal information
- Nationality: Egyptian
- Born: 1924
- Died: 4 September 2003; Cairo, Egypt

Sport
- Sport: Equestrian

Omar El-Hadary (1924 – 4 September 2003) was an Egyptian equestrian. He competed in two events at the 1956 Summer Olympics.
