= Roberto Moll (equestrian) =

Venezuelan equestrian

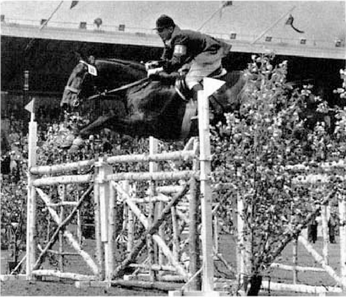

Personal information
- Nationality: Venezuelan
- Born: 8 October 1933 (age 91)

Sport
- Sport: Equestrian

Roberto Moll (born 8 October 1933) is a Venezuelan equestrian. He competed in two events at the 1956 Summer Olympics.
