= Víctor Molina =

Venezuelan equestrian

Personal information
- Nationality: Venezuelan
- Born: 2 November 1924
- Died: 1999 (aged 74–75)

Sport
- Sport: Equestrian

Víctor Molina (2 November 1924 – 1999) was a Venezuelan equestrian. He competed in two events at the 1956 Summer Olympics.
