= Lajos Somlay =

Hungarian equestrian

Personal information
- Nationality: Hungarian
- Born: 18 February 1924; Budapest, Hungary
- Died: 20 March 1962 (aged 38); Budapest, Hungary

Sport
- Sport: Equestrian

Lajos Somlay (18 February 1924 – 20 March 1962) was a Hungarian equestrian. He competed at the 1956 Summer Olympics and the 1960 Summer Olympics.
