= Billy Ringrose (equestrian) =

Irish equestrian (1930–2020)

Personal information
- Full name: William A. Ringrose
- Nationality: Irish
- Born: 13 June 1930; County Limerick, Ireland
- Died: 30 April 2020 (aged 89)

Sport
- Sport: Equestrian

William A. Ringrose (13 June 1930 – 30 April 2020) was an Irish equestrian. He competed for Ireland at the 1956 Summer Olympics and the 1960 Summer Olympics. He was educated at Synge Street CBS and University College, Dublin.
