= Bernard de Fombelle =

French equestrian

Personal information
- Nationality: French
- Born: 9 January 1924; Limoges, France
- Died: 14 July 1987 (aged 63); Limoges, France

Sport
- Sport: Equestrian

Bernard de Fombelle (9 January 1924 – 14 July 1987) was a French equestrian. He competed at the 1956 Summer Olympics and the 1960 Summer Olympics.
