= Jesús Rivas (equestrian) =

Venezuelan equestrian (born 1923)

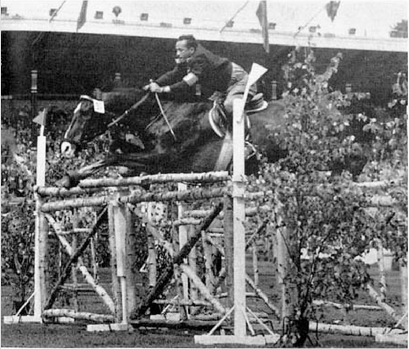

Personal information
- Full name: Jesús Rivas Moncada
- Nationality: Venezuelan
- Born: 1 September 1923

Sport
- Sport: Equestrian

Jesús Rivas (born 1 September 1923) was a Venezuelan equestrian. He competed in two events at the 1956 Summer Olympics.
