= Naldo Dasso =

Argentine equestrian (1931–2023)

Personal information
- Born: 3 July 1931 Embajador Martini, La Pampa, Argentina
- Died: 2 September 2023 (aged 92)

Sport
- Sport: Equestrian

Naldo Miguel Dasso (3 July 1931 – 2 September 2023) was an Argentine equestrian, army general and convicted war criminal. He competed at the 1956 Summer Olympics and the 1960 Summer Olympics. Dasso died on 2 September 2023, at the age of 92.

His father Vicente was the three-time mayor of his hometown, Embajador Martini. In the 1970s, during the Dirty War, Dasso served as a general in the Argentine Army. He was sentenced to life imprisonment in 2013 for his actions as a general, including crimes against humanity and conspiracy, illegal raids on homes, illegal deprivation of liberty and the enforced disappearance of two militants.
