= Andrey Favorsky =

Soviet equestrian

Personal information
- Nationality: Soviet
- Born: 4 January 1929; Kyrgyzstan
- Died: 13 May 2005 (aged 76); Moscow, Russia

Sport
- Sport: Equestrian

Andrey Favorsky (4 January 1929 – 13 May 2005) was a Soviet equestrian. He competed at the 1956 Summer Olympics, the 1960 Summer Olympics and the 1964 Summer Olympics.
