= Anders Gernandt (equestrian) =

Swedish equestrian

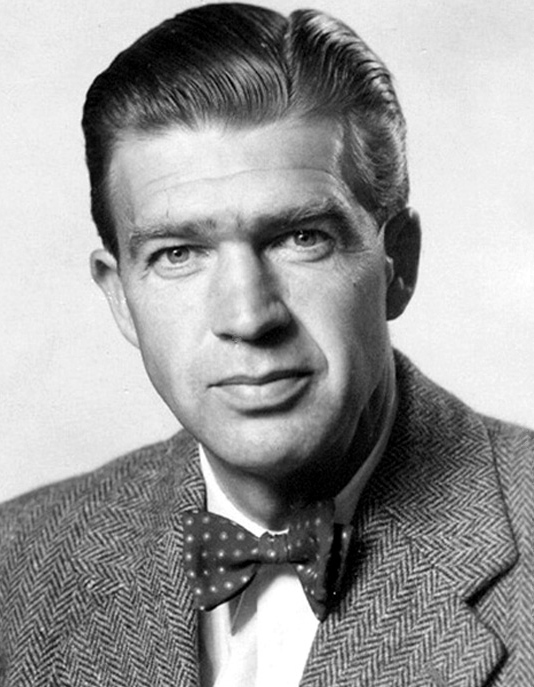
- Anders Gernandt by the late 1950s

Personal information
- Born: 30 April 1920 Råneå, Sweden
- Died: 2 November 2000 (aged 80) Lidingö, Stockholm, Sweden
- Height: 183 cm (6 ft 0 in)
- Weight: 72 kg (159 lb)

Sport
- Sport: Horse riding
- Club: Skövde FRK

Anders Erik Gernandt (30 April 1920 – 2 November 2000) was a Swedish officer and horse rider. He competed at the 1956 and 1960 Summer Olympics in the individual and team jumping with the best result of individual 32nd place in 1956.

== Career ==
Gernandt was born on 30 April 1920 in Råneå, Norrbotten County, Sweden, the son of Dr Fredrik Gernandt and his wife Hanny (née Hippe). He was commissioned as an officer in 1942 and became Fänrik in the Swedish cavalry. He was promoted to ryttmästare in 1952 and was promoted to captain of the Swedish Army Quartermaster Corps in 1953. Gernandt became captain in the reserve in 1965 where he was promoted to major in 1974.

He later became a liked TV-commentator of equestrian sport, commenting in Sveriges Radio from 1961 to 1991. Gernandt worked as a visitor manager at Sveriges Television (SVT) from 1980 to 1985. He also added the opening and ending comments in Swedish, in the American comedy show Soap.

== Personal life ==
In 1944, he married Lil Renner (born 1922), the daughter of Commander Louis Renner and Lisbeth (née Lilljequist).

== Dates of rank ==
- 1942 – Second lieutenant
- 19?? – Lieutenant
- 1952 – Ryttmästare
- 1965 – Captain
- 1974 – Major

== Bibliography ==
- Gernandt, Anders (1995). Hästminne (in Swedish). Stockholm: Fischer. ISBN 9170547645. SELIBR 7596510.
- Gernandt, Anders (1991). Det osynliga livet (in Swedish) (1st ed.). Lidingö: Hälsa-böcker. ISBN 9185506524. SELIBR 7749690.
- Gernandt, Anders (1985). Anders Gernandt om ridpoolen: en intervju med Anders Gernandt om ridsportens utveckling och näringslivets intresse av ridsport-sponsring (in Swedish). Stockholm: Svenska ridsportens centralförbund. SELIBR 541779.
- Gernandt, Anders (1982). Hälsa - till alla. Studiehandledning (in Swedish). Stockholm: Hälsokostrådet. ISBN 91-86170-00-7. SELIBR 7755557.
- Gernandt, Anders (1981). Hälsa - till alla (in Swedish). Stockholm: Hälsokostrådet. ISBN 91-86170-00-7. SELIBR 7755556.
- Gernandt, Anders; Dorch, Börje (1975). Vi älskar hästar. Praktika, 99-1771415-4 (in Swedish). Stockholm: Bonnier. ISBN 9100249203. SELIBR 830601.
- Gernandt, Anders (1974). Dressyr, terrängritt, hoppning. Den moderna handboken (in Swedish). Stockholm: Wahlström & Widstrand. ISBN 9146120025. SELIBR 1283645.
- Gernandt, Anders; Hedenberg, Leif; Mathiasson, Hans Åke (1973). Till häst: tretton ridlektioner (in Swedish). Stockholm: Sveriges radio. ISBN 9152213927. SELIBR 7409498.
- Gernandt, Anders; Dorch, Börje (1971). Vi älskar hästar. Praktika, 99-1771415-4 (in Swedish). Täby: Larson. SELIBR 1283635.
