= João Azevedo (equestrian) =

Portuguese equestrian (born 1921)

Personal information
- Nationality: Portuguese
- Born: 1921

Sport
- Sport: Equestrian

João Azevedo (born 1921) was a Portuguese equestrian. He competed in two events at the 1956 Summer Olympics.
