= Mohamed Selim Zaki =

Egyptian equestrian (1924–2021)

Mohamed Selim Zaki (16 July 1924 – December 2021) was an Egyptian equestrian who competed in the 1952 Summer Olympics, in the 1956 Summer Olympics, and in the 1960 Summer Olympics. Zaki died in December 2021, at the age of 97.
