= Cevdet Sümer =

Turkish equestrian

Personal information
- Nationality: Turkish
- Born: 17 December 1922; Istanbul, Turkey
- Died: 1967 (aged 44–45)

Sport
- Sport: Equestrian

Cevdet Sümer (17 December 1922 – 1967) was a Turkish equestrian. He competed in two events at the 1960 Summer Olympics.
