= George Harding Cuthbertson =

Canadian boat designer and builder

- Born: June 3, 1929; Brantford, Ontario, Canada
- Died: October 5, 2017 (aged 88); Toronto, Ontario, Canada
- Resting place: Park Lawn Cemetery in Toronto
- Education: University of Toronto (BEng)
- Occupations: boat designer and builder
- Years active: 1951–1986
- Organization(s): Cuthbertson & Cassian yacht designers, C&C Yachts
- Title: C&C's chief designer until 1973, then company president. He later also served as chairman and chief operating officer
- Term: 1969–1981
- Successor: C&C's chief designer Robert W. Ball
- Spouse: Helen Donaldson
- Children: Jill, Michael, JohnKelly
- Parents: Allan Edward Cuthbertson (father); Elma Charlotte Ferguson (mother)
- Awards: 1974 membership in the Royal Canadian Academy of Arts. 2011 Legends of Ontario Sailing Award; 2014 The Canadian Sailing Hall of Fame

George Harding Cuthbertson RCA (1929–2017) was a founding partner of Cuthbertson & Cassian yacht designers, one of four companies that in 1969 formed C&C Yachts, a Canadian yacht builder that dominated North American sailing in the 1970s and early ‘80s.

His was the first “C” in C&C, with his design associate George Cassian, being the second. Cuthbertson would go on to be president of that company for many years, establishing plants in Rhode Island and Kiel, Germany, boat production in England and Italy, in addition to their existing Production Plant in Niagara-on-the-Lake, Ontario, and Custom Shop in Oakville, ON.

In an article in Maclean's magazine in August 1970 George Cuthbertson was described as six-foot-four, weighing 220 pounds. He has a crewcut, his voice is deep, and he looks like a linebacker on his day off. He also had a couple of nicknames:

When it comes to nicknames, sailing and the yacht business may be even cuter and more prolific than, say, golf and the golf business. Cuthbertson is not only Big George, he's also Cumbersome. Cassian is not only Little George, he's also Casual. Get it? C & C Yachts.

== Early life ==
Cuthbertson was born on June 3, 1929, in Brantford, Ontario. He was the second son of Elma Charlotte (née Ferguson), and Allan Edward Cuthbertson, who was general manager and later president of Harding Carpets, which operated a factory in Brantford. George's middle name came from carpet company founder Victor Harding.

The elder Mr. Cuthbertson died suddenly of a heart attack in 1943. His widow and sons moved to her hometown of Toronto. There was no yachting background in his family. There had been exposure to boating at summer camps, but it was his enrolment in the Royal Canadian Yacht Club's junior program at 14 and his introduction to the instruction boats, known with dubious affection as "Brutal Beasts", that provided a formal introduction to the sport.

George had an enjoyment for sailing, one that encompassed not only athletics but form and structure. As a boy, he was always drawing airplanes and ships, and translating them to scale, from imagined solid form to two-dimensional schemes. He was beginning to see how mathematics could govern speed and size, along with other things. With time, this vision would lead to a career of a Canadian yacht designer.

The circle of potential clients and associates was relatively small, and Cuthbertson made many key connections as the Royal Canadian Yacht Club's official measurer, a post he assumed at 17. The job put him in touch with many individuals important to his future, and lent him first-hand experience with the shapes and dimensions of the Great Lakes' faster yachts.

== Education ==
George completed high school in Toronto before earning a degree in mechanical engineering at the University of Toronto, graduating in 1950.

== Career ==
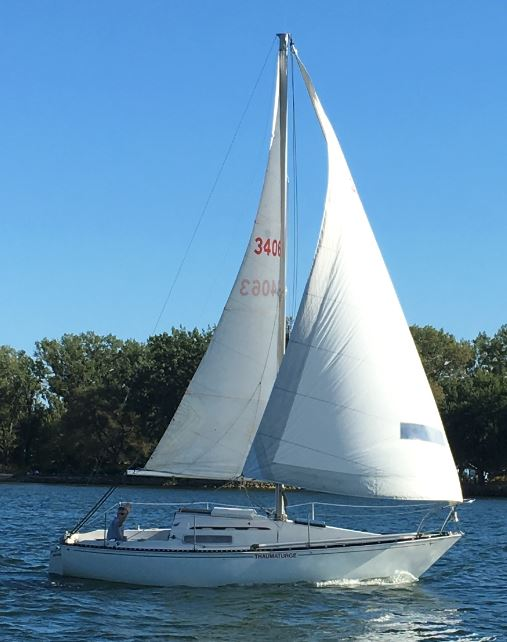
C&C 25 designed by Cuthbertson

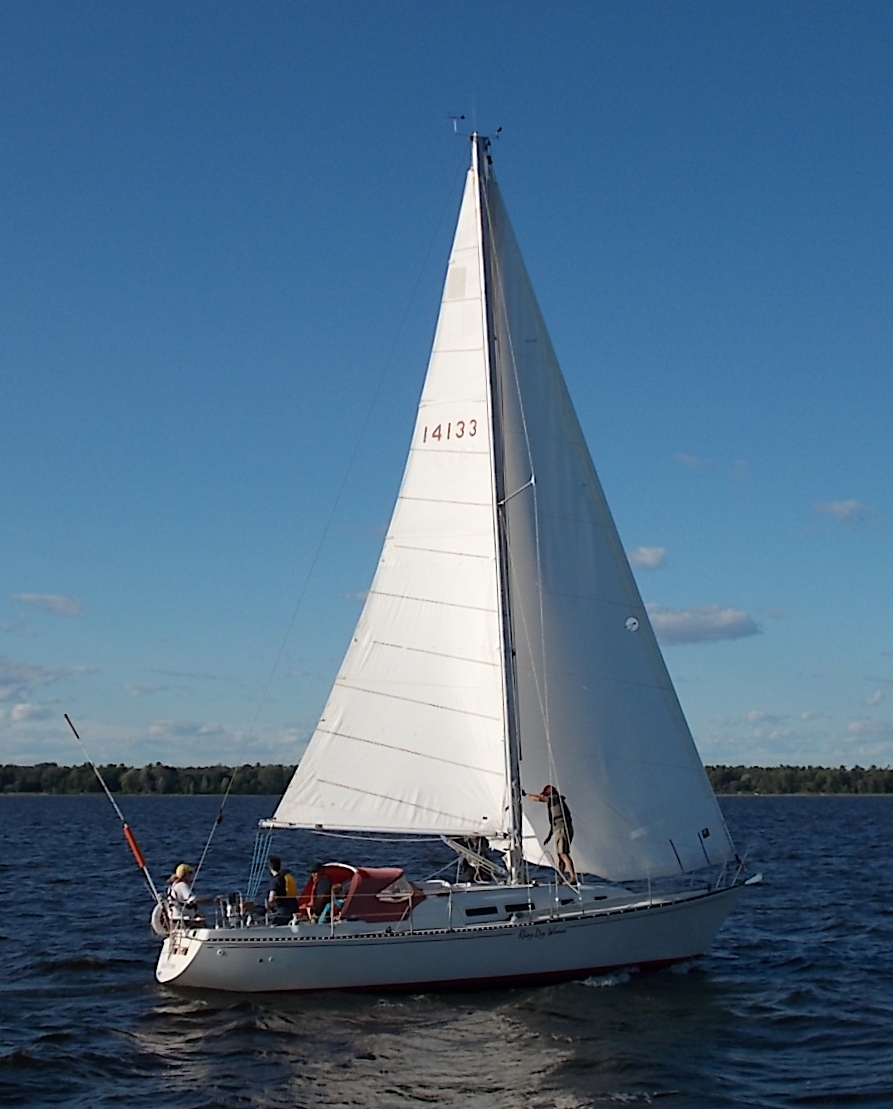
C&C 35 Mk 1 designed by Cuthbertson

After graduating Cuthbertson worked for a time for the Canadian operation of SKF, the Swedish ball-bearing manufacturer. In 1951, he formed a registered partnership with Peter Davidson, a young man also active in sailing at the RCYC, for the purpose of producing products in an experimental new material called fibreglass. This work led to Cuthbertson's first production design, the Water Rat, a small dinghy conceived in 1953. About 80 in all were built, mostly with the bare hands of the two partners. There wasn't a lot of work for yacht design in Canada at that time, so they operated a yacht brokerage, which imported yachts from Europe, under the name of Canadian Northern Co.

=== Venture II ===
Cuthbertson was active in both 6-Metre and 8-Metre competition, which led to an important modification assignment. The RCYC and the Rochester Yacht Club had arranged to revive the Canada's Cup, an emblem of match racing supremacy on the Great Lakes, last contested between the two clubs in 1934, in honour of the RCYC's centennial in 1954. The series was to be sailed, as in the previous outing, in 8-Metres, and Royal Canadian Yacht Club member Norm Walsh hired Cuthbertson to secure a proven 8-Metre and draw up its alterations. After losing the opening race of the match series, Walsh's Venture II, with Cuthbertson and Davidson aboard, won three straight to bring the Canada's Cup to its native land for the first time since 1903. It was an encouraging debut for the 25 year-old Canadian designer, and it paid off with an imagined dividend when Walsh subsequently asked Cuthbertson to provide the design for a large ocean racer.

=== Inishfree ===
Inishfree was George Cuthbertson's first design of consequence and she was built in Meaford, Ontario by Cliff Richardson Boat Works. A year and a half under construction, her materials and workmanship were the finest. Finished bright, she was double planked of mahogany over laminated oak frames, and bronze fastened with cast bronze centreboard in a monel trunk. Her laid deck was of teak, and her mainmast aluminum, but her other spars were of spruce. Inishfree was launched in August, 1958 and sailed from Georgian Bay to Toronto in time to score her first win – the Edward Prince of Wales Cup. In 1960, the RCYC burgee was first flown in a Bermuda Race as Inishfree sailed to a respectable finish in Class B. Returning home, she won the Freeman Cup Race, her first of three in a row – the only yacht ever to so accomplish – and she added a fourth Freeman Cup win in 1964.

Many more trophies bear her name. In 1961 alone, Inishfree won the Marlatt and Boswell Trophies, the Cosgrave, Dufferin, Marquis of Lorne and Queen's Cups, her second Freeman Cup and the Rochester Race – her first of three in a row.

Subsequently, owned by W. Bernard Herman of Island Yacht Club, Inishfree became in the early 1960s the first Canadian entrant in the Southern Ocean Racing Circuit, initiating Canadian participation which was to prove historic in years to come. She promptly began to rack up an enviable race record on Lake Ontario.

=== Canadian Northern Co. ===
Cuthbertson modified a number of European yachts for the North American market. These Canadian Northern 35s were designed by Cuthbertson and built of steel by Kurt Beister in Norderney, Germany. A half dozen were built by Cliff Richardson in Meaford, Ontario. One, named Carousel was ordered as a bare hull by a boyhood friend of Cuthbertson's from sailing days in Port Credit, who had since become Peter Davidson's brother-in-law. His name was Perry Connolly, and he would soon return to George Cuthbertson for the design that would make both their names household words in international sailing circles.

"At this time, Ted Brewer was very involved with our brokerage and import activities," Cuthbertson says. "Ted was with us for about three years, functioning as a yacht broker (and a very effective one) while studying yacht design in his spare time through the Westlawn course. In time, he also moved to the U.S. to take a job with Luders Marine Construction in Stamford, Conn., and so began his distinguished career."

Much had happened in the interim between the 1954 Canada's Cup and the launching of Inishfree. Cuthbertson and Davidson had parted ways, leaving Cuthbertson on his own to pursue further design commissions.

=== Cuthbertson & Cassian ===
In 1961 Cuthbertson took George Cassian into the company, and established the design firm of Cuthbertson & Cassian, which designed a number of successful steel, and strip planked wooden boats for Great Lakes and East Coast customers.

In an interview Cutbertson explained:

In late ’58 there was a very major plant, Avro up in Malton, Ontario, building aircraft. They had developed the Avro Arrow [Canada's first supersonic aircraft], which was apparently superb. They built a half-dozen, the customer being the Canadian government. It was generally acknowledged to be the best aircraft of its type—a fighter—in the world at that time. For a variety of reasons that are still hotly debated, the prime minister at that time [1957–1963], John Diefenbaker, canceled the contract. Whoosh! Avro had no choice but to immediately shut down, they were so wedded to that program. Diefenbaker canceled the contract on a Friday and that laid off 17,000 people, including George Cassian, who was in the design department. On Monday this young chap walked into my office and introduced himself. Said we'd met once several years before at a party, which was likely. Was there any chance he could get a job?

He had drawings with him and I was impressed. I said, “George, I have two weeks of design work ahead of me. And if you join, that will be one week each.”

So he said, “Well, I haven't got anything else to do.” So I said, “Okay.” He was with me for almost a year. His other interest was automobiles, racing cars. He decided to move to Detroit in the auto industry, but whenever he was back in Toronto, where his family was, he'd drop in the office to see how things were going. He told me he was moving home and getting married and would like to buy a share of the business. I was up to my ears in debt, having trouble paying bills, so I sold him a 25% interest. We incorporated as Cuthbertson & Cassian Ltd. In due course that 25% was increased to one third. We were never a partnership.

Among the more notable Cuthbertson & Cassian products from the early 1960s were Vanadis, a 34-footer built of steel in Germany for Payson Mayhew of Chicago in 1960, Galatia for Tony Ronza Sr., Laura for Doug Hood, Courtesan for John Young of Shelter Island, NY, Inferno I for Jim McHugh, La Mouette and Thermopylae for Gordon Fisher, and the little motorsailor Pipe Dream for Sonny Slemin. When Payson Mayhew's Vanadis attended the 1961 Southern Ocean Racing Conference (SORC), Cuthbertson was part of her crew. His appearance may have heen the first modern day participation by a Canadian in the circuit, and the experience introduced him to many people who would be influential in the development of C&C.

==== La Mouette ====
The 38-foot La Mouette was a wooden design built at Metro Marine in Bronte for Gord Fisher of the Royal Canadian Yacht Club, which led to a semi-production series. Erich Bruckmann, who would later be one of the founding partners of C&C Yachts, had been shop supervisor at Metro Marine when La Mouette was built.

=== Fibreglass construction ===
By 1964, the company was but a short step away from becoming involved in designs of fibreglass construction. Cuthbertson had some experience with the material back in the early 1950s, building the Water Rat dinghy, but it was only beginning to have an impact on the boating industry in the early 1960s.

The introduction of fibreglass boats was about to make a complete change to the industry and the very nature of recreational boating. Fibreglass would make possible the existence of proper production designs, which in turn would significantly lower the cost of an individual yacht, making the sport accessible to a more general and increasingly affluent public.

Cuthbertson & Cassian's first commission for a fibreglass design came from Hinterhoeller Limited, a rapidly growing firm in Niagara-on-the-Lake, Ontario. Its founder, George Hinterhoeller, had apprenticed as a boat builder in his native Austria before emigrating to Canada in 1952. He had gone into business for himself in 1957, then incorporated as a private company in 1963. The 36-foot design Cuthbertson & Cassian supplied him became known as the Invader class, and about two dozen were built on a semi-production basis. The partnership then provided him with the design for the Redwing 30 and, later, the Redwing 35. These complimented the designs of Hinterhoeller himself, already in production—the HR 25, the HR 28 and the fantastically successful 24-footer, the Shark.

In 1965, Ian Morch of the Belleville Marine Yard commissioned C&C to design the 31-foot Corvette. The centerboard sloop was built of fiberglass and numbered several hundred before production ceased.

==== Red Jacket ====
The same year, Canadian yachtsman Perry Connolly asked C&C to design a custom 40 ft (12 m) racing sloop for him. The design directive called for flat-out speed. Connolly said he wanted "the meanest, hungriest 40-footer afloat".

The boat, named Red Jacket, was built by Bruckmann Manufacturing, in Oakville, Ontario, in fiberglass with a balsa core; the resulting structure was (and is) strong, stiff and significantly lighter than the wood or solid fiberglass yachts then sailing. Red Jacket is considered to be the first sailboat engineered with a cored hull (other earlier boats had balsacored decks, and powerboat builders were using it in transoms and superstructures). No doubt the weight savings and panel stiffness of her cored hull contributed significantly to her racing success. She was launched in May 1966 and took 11 of 13 starts that summer. That winter, Red Jacket headed south and won the famed SORC (Southern Ocean Racing Conference), which was a series of six races with the major two being from St. Petersburg to Fort Lauderdale and from Miami to Nassau.competing against over 85 of the best racers of the day. Red Jacket was the first Canadian boat to win the SORC.

In 1970, Murray Burt wrote for Maclean's:

There are series of offshore-racing events in Long Island Sound, there's the celebrated Bermuda race, there are campaigns off British Columbia, there's the transpacific from Los Angeles to Honolulu, and there are at least a dozen other important offshore conferences. But, each year, the first one to grab the attention of the industry, and of the fans with the sort of scratch actually to buy one of these craft, is the Southern Ocean Racing Conference. This is where all the previous months’ drawing-board sweating over prismatic coefficients, wetted surfaces, ratios of sail plans, and overlap, either pays off or flops in a horrible way. The SORC is the ultimate tropical test tank for designers, sailors, owners, riggers and sailmakers. For the pros.

It's a series of six races around the coast of Florida, and it starts each January and runs into March, winding up in Nassau. You cannot win the SORC without beating anywhere from 60 to 90 of the costliest, bestdesigned, best-sailed offshore-racing yachts in North America. And that is i exactly what Red Jacket did. She's the only boat from outside the United States ever to win the SORC.

Red Jacket is still actively raced by her owners, members the Royal Canadian Yacht Club.

=== C&C Yachts ===
In September 1969 the design firm of Cuthbertson & Cassian Ltd. joined with three of the builders producing Cuthbertson & Cassian designs, Belleville Marine Yard, Hinterhoeller Ltd. and Bruckmann Manufacturing to form C&C Yachts. In that first year C&C achieves sales of $3.9 million.

==== Manitou ====
The year of the merger brought a challenge for the Canada's Cup, a match-race between Canada and the US. C&C's custom shop, Bruckmann Manufacturing of Oakville, Ontario, built the three Canadian defenders, one of which, Manitou, beat the Sparkman and Stephens-designed Niagara.

On Manitou's victory Burt said:

At the moment, if your average Canadian sports fan has heard of any C & C yacht at all, she is probably the Manitou. Last September, in the very pricey competition for the ancient Canada's Cup, Manitou knocked out the American yacht Niagara in three consecutive races. Both yachts had been designed specifically for the Canada's Cup series and, in view of the competition, Cuthbertson and Cassian might be forgiven if Manitou's unequivocal triumph gave them a few sweet moments of gloating. Niagara had come from the drawing board of Olin Stephens, of Sparkman and Stephens Inc. of New York. Stephens has designed all but one winner of yachting's most famous trophy, the America's Cup, since World War II. Three of them. He's a kind of mortal God of yacht design. True, Manitou's Canadian crew did sail the boat brilliantly. True, Cuthbertson did say, Oh shucks, there's no one in the business as good as Olin Stephens. Or something like that. Yet George and George had designed a boat that beat Olin Stephens’ latest, and she'd beaten her three straight. And there could scarcely have been one well-heeled deep-sea racing devotee in the whole world who did not hear about it.

In 1971 hull #1 of the 43 ft (13.1 m) "Limited Edition" series, Arieto, won first in Class B of the SORC, and the Montego Bay Race. Also in 1971, Endurance, a 43-footer as well, won the Chicago-Mackinac Race. In 1972, Condor, the prototype Redline 41 won SORC overall and the 43 foot Arieto won the Nassau and Governor's cups.

==== Other Cuthbertson designs for C&C Yachts ====
The C&C designs that came off Cuthbertson's drawing board in the early 70s for production building at the Niagara-on-the-Lake plant of George Hinterhoeller are legendary and include the C&C 25, 27, 30, 35, and 39. The Custom Shop under Erich Bruckmann built such Cuthbertson & Cassian designed classics as the Redline 41, C&C 43, C&C 50, and the remarkable C&C 61. The Redline 41 Condor would follow Red Jacket's lead and win SORC overall in 1971.

The custom yachts that came off Cuthbertson's board in this time period further consolidated Cuthbertson's and C&C's reputation on the race course under the CCA rule, and included the 53’ Inferno II for Jim McHugh, the 54’ Bonaventure V for Bernie Herman, True North for the 1969 Canada's Cup, and Mirage and Merrythought for the unsuccessful 1971 defence of Canada's Cup, both of which would go on to achieve great offshore racing success under Gerry Moog and Jack King.

In the 1971 SORC, boats designed by Cuthbertson & Cassian won overall and took first place in three of the five divisions.

After the introduction of the IOR Rule in the early 1970s, the sailing world changed dramatically with the rise of a whole new cohort of young designers. This, combined with the increased demands of running what was becoming a large multi-national public company answerable to a Board of Directors, led Cuthbertson to hand the design responsibilities to Robert Ball in 1973. After a short break from the company, Cuthbertson returned to C&C in the position of President, a position he held until an outside acquisition of the company in late 1981.

=== Motion Designs ===
In 1982, Cuthbertson left the company he created to relaunch his design career with a new company, Motion Designs, producing drawings for Ontario Yachts and other local Ontario builders.

== Retirement ==
Cuthbertson served as official historian of the Royal Canadian Yacht Club and as an honorary curator at the Marine Museum of the Great Lakes at Kingston, Ontario, where he long served on the board of directors.

Through the 1970s Cuthbertson flew Cessna 172s and floatplanes. In his retirement continued to fly, usually a custom built Cessna 172. He also tinkered with furniture design and travelled widely. It was his practice to visit marinas to check in on the condition of the sailboats he had designed.

He maintained a soft spot for the dinghies with which he launched his career. The user name of his e-mail address was "waterrat."

== Death ==
George H. Cuthbertson, aged 88, died on October 3, 2017, at his home in Toronto, Canada. George Cuthbertson was the last surviving member of the original founders of C&C, being predeceased by George Cassian, Ian Morch, George Hinterhoeller, and Erich Bruckmann.

== Awards ==
In 1974, George H. Cuthbertson was elected to membership in the Royal Canadian Academy of Arts.

George H. Cuthbertson was awarded the Canadian Yachting Magazine, Ontario Sailing, 2011 Legends of Ontario Sailing Award as one of the “Builders of C&C Yachts”

Queen Elizabeth II Diamond Jubilee Medal in 2012 to honour significant contributions and achievements by a Canadian.

George H. Cuthbertson was inducted into the Canadian Sailing Hall of Fame in 2014.

== Cuthbertson archive ==
The Marine Museum of the Great Lakes has in its archives the early original C&C design and construction drawings, a retirement donation by Cuthbertson of his papers. In 2008 Tim Jackett, whose company bought the C&C name in 1996, donated the rest of the Cuthbertson papers and more, dating from 1972 through to the late 1980s.

== Boat designs ==
Some of George Cutbertson's designs include:

- 54 ft (16 m) Inishfree
- Corvette 31
- C&C 25
- C&C 27
- C&C 30
- C&C 35
- C&C 39
- Classic 22
- Redline 41
- C&C 43-1
- C&C 50
- C&C 61
- Redline 41
- 53 ft (16 m) Inferno II
- 54 ft (16 m) Bonaventure V

=== Favourites ===
When George Cuthbertson was asked back in 1992 to name the company's most outstanding boats from his tenure, he felt that the original C&C 35 was a standout. He also mentioned two other models from its era: The Redline 41 Condor earned C&C its second—and last—SORC title in 1972. At that same SORC, the C&C 61 Sorcery was first overall in two races. Socery had amassed a trophy case of victories in 1971 for owner James Baldwin of Locust Valley, N.Y., and Cuthbertson felt the fame of this design has been largely overlooked in Canada because none of the 61s ever sailed in "local" waters.

== See also ==
- List of sailboat designers and manufacturers
