= George Cassian =

Canadian yacht designer

- Born: 1932
- Died: April 19, 1980; Toronto, Ontario, Canada
- Education: Central Technical School
- Occupation: boat designer
- Years active: 1959 - 1979
- Employers: A.V. Roe; Cuthbertson & Cassian Ltd.; C&C Yachts
- Known for: yacht design
- Title: designer
- Awards: 2011 Legends of Ontario Sailing Award

George Cassian was a yacht designer and founding partner of Cuthbertson & Cassian yacht designers, one of four companies that in 1969 formed C&C Yachts, a Canadian yacht builder that dominated North American sailing in the 1970s and early 1980s. His was the second “C” in C&C, with his design associate George Cuthbertson, being the first. Cassian would continue as a designer with that company until his untimely death in 1980 at the age of 47.

== Early life ==
George Cassian grew up in Toronto, Ontario, Canada, near the western Toronto lakeshore. As a teenager he began to sail in an old 14 ft (4.3 m) dinghy at the Toronto Sailing And Canoe Club. As he gained experience he began to sail competitively. Over time he sailed and competed in most of the hotter one-design classes — Lightnings, Dragons, 5.5s — and over time he came to be regarded as a highly competitive sailor.

== Education ==
George Cassian studied technical draughting at Central Technical School in Toronto, Ontario.

== Career ==
On graduation Cassian decided the future looked bright in aircraft design, so he went to work in the design office of A.V. Roe. With the cancellation of the Avro Arrow contract, Cassian was one of the 17,000 Avro employees laid off on 20 February 1959.

=== Cuthbertson & Cassian Ltd. ===
The Monday after the Avro shutdown Cassian walked into George Cuthbertson's design office in Port Credit, Ontario, introduced himself as George Cassian, and told Cuthbertson that they had met at a party one or two years prior. A keen sailor, member of Toronto Sailing and Canoe Club, Cassian asked if his skills might be of some use in Cuthbertson office.

Cassian showed Cuthbertson several examples of his work. Cuthbertson was impressed but had to point out that he could foresee only about two weeks of design work ahead and, if he joined Cuthbertson, that would double the design staff and they might have to part after only one week. Cassian replied that he had no better opportunity, so he would like to come on board on that clear understanding.

Other work came in, and Cuthbertson and Cassian worked together for about a year when Cassian told Cuthbertson that he had decided to move to Detroit to pursue his other passion (automobiles, racing cars) and he had an opportunity in the auto industry. However, with family in Toronto, Cassian was frequently home on weekends and often dropped into Cuthbertson's office to see how things were going. Evidently things did not go all that well in Detroit, and after about a year, on one of Cassian's visits, he told Cuthbertson that he had decided to return home, was going to be married, and could he have his old job back. As an indication that he was serious about staying, Cassian inquired about buying into the company.

All of this sounded fine to Cuthbertson, so he sold him a 25% interest (later increased to 33%), which all went to pay off debts, and in 1961 they incorporated, the name chosen being Cuthbertson & Cassian Ltd. Neither George Cassian nor George Cuthbertson had ever worked in any yacht design office other than their own, so they had no preconceptions as to normal process and procedure.

Cuthbertson managed the business, doing much of his design work late into the evenings. The two worked in collaboration, with Cuthbertson doing the preliminary lines and calculations and Cassian the interior plans and details. Later they would come to be known by staff as "Cumbersome and Casual," a humorous reflection on their differing styles.

Cassian had another nickname, Little George (Cuthbertson was Big George). That was because he was only six feet tall, and weighed only 170 pounds, compared to Cuthbertson's six-foot-four 220 pound frame. An article in Maclean's in 1970 described Cassian:

In his quiet, smiling, intense way, Cassian reminds you of an academic, perhaps a professor of middle-European languages. He plays guitar, wears his black hair long, and has been known to step aboard someone’s yacht in a pretty noisy pair of bellbottoms. Yachting people by tradition are a conservative bunch, and Cassian inspires a fair number of rueful remarks about “the hippy yacht designer.” George Cassian is going to knock around the house on Sunday afternoon. He’s going to play a little Spanish guitar for his wife, his two kids, and their German Shepherd bitch. He’s going to play a little tennis or squash. He’s going to take his gleaming new, red, knee - high Formula Ford out for a few laps at Mosport, or somewhere.

Their first designs included a 34-foot steel boat, Vanadis, built by Kurt Beister in Germany and La Mouette, built of wood at Metro Marine in Bronte, Ontario. In 1965, Ian Morch of the Belleville Marine Yard commissioned C&C to design the 31-foot Corvette. The centerboard sloop was built of fiberglass and several hundred were completed before production ceased.

==== Red Jacket ====
The same year, Canadian yachtsman Perry Connolly asked C&C to design a custom 40 ft (12 m) racing sloop for him. The design directive called for flat-out speed. Connolly said he wanted "the meanest, hungriest 40-footer afloat".

The boat, named Red Jacket, was built by Bruckmann Manufacturing, in Oakville, Ontario, in fiberglass with a balsa core; the resulting structure was (and is) strong, stiff and significantly lighter than the wood or solid fiberglass yachts then sailing. Red Jacket is considered to be the first sailboat engineered with a cored hull (other earlier boats had balsa-cored decks, and powerboat builders were using it in transoms and superstructures). No doubt the weight savings and panel stiffness of her cored hull contributed significantly to her racing success. She was launched in May 1966 and took 11 of 13 starts that summer. That winter, Red Jacket headed south and won the famed SORC (Southern Ocean Racing Conference), which was a series of six races with the major two being from St. Petersburg to Fort Lauderdale and from Miami to Nassau.competing against over 85 of the best racers of the day. Red Jacket was the first Canadian boat to win the SORC. George Cassian was a regular member of the crew of Red Jacket. She is still actively raced by her owners, members the Royal Canadian Yacht Club.

=== C&C Yachts ===
That victory was quickly followed by a successful defence of the Canada's Cup with Manitou in 1969. This racing success resulted in the formation of C&C Yachts in the same year with the amalgamation of the design firm and the three builders producing Cuthbertson & Cassian designs.

In September 1969 the design firm of Cuthbertson & Cassian Ltd. joined with Belleville Marine Yard, Hinterhoeller Ltd. and Bruckmann Manufacturing to form C&C Yachts. In that first year C&C achieves sales of $3.9 million.

The C&C designs that came off C&C's drawing board in the early 70s for production building at the Niagara-on-the-Lake plant of George Hinterhoeller included the C&C 25, 27, 30, 35, and 39. The Custom Shop under Erich Bruckmann built such Cuthbertson & Cassian designs as the Redline 41, C&C 43-1, C&C 50, and the successful C&C 61. The Redline 41 Condor would follow Red Jacket's lead and win SORC overall in 1971.

The high water mark of Cassian's design career was the 1971 SORC where Cuthbertson & Cassian-designed boats not only won overall, but also won three of the five divisions. This is a feat which has never been achieved by another designer.

Cassian continued to work in the design office at C&C. He spent several years running the research and development (R&D) arm of the company, but financial constraints resulted in the management decision to curtail the R&D department and Cassian rejoined the design group.

== Death ==
George Cassian died of a heart attack on 10 April 1980, following a strenuous squash tournament at just 47 years of age. George Cuthbertson, then C&C president, said of Cassian:

"George's forte was his superb draftsmanship... and an impeccable design sense. He was gentle and sensitive, and his untimely passing is a grave loss...."

Cassian was survived by his first and second wives and four children.

== Awards ==
George Cassian was awarded the Canadian Yachting Magazine, Ontario Sailing, 2011 Legends of Ontario Sailing Award as one of the “Builders of C&C Yachts”

== See also ==
- List of sailboat designers and manufacturers
