= Erich Bruckmann =

Erich Karl Ludwig Bruckmann
- Born: March 15, 1930; Düsseldorf, Germany
- Died: October 28, 2011 (aged 81); Burlington, Ontario, Canada
- Citizenship: Canadian
- Occupation: yacht builder
- Years active: 1956 - 1984
- Employers: Bruckmann Manufacturing; C&C Yachts
- Known for: yacht construction
- Spouse: Elisabeth (Lisa)
- Children: Peter; Caroline; Mark; John; David
- Parents: Ludwig Bruckmann (father); Klara (mother)
- Awards: 2011 Legends of Ontario Sailing Award

Erich Bruckmann was a boat builder and founder of Bruckmann Manufacturing, one of four companies that in 1969 formed C&C Yachts, a Canadian yacht builder that dominated North American sailing in the 1970s and early 1980s.

Erich Bruckmann built the revolutionary racing yacht Red Jacket which featured a first in sailboat construction - an extremely light weight balsa core - which allowed the vessel to compete and win. Red Jacket won 11 of 13 races in her first season, including the Charles Freeman Cup and the Lake Ontario International. In the 1967 Southern Ocean Racing Conference (SORC) race from St. Petersburg to Venice in Florida, Red Jacket finished first. It won against a fleet of about 85 others, many being the best U.S. racers.

== Early life ==
Erich Bruckmann was born in Düsseldorf, Germany in 1930.

== Education ==
While in Germany, Bruckmann completed his education in cabinetmaking and master carpentry.

== Career ==
Bruckmann arrived in Oakville, Ontario from Germany in 1956, speaking no English and with little other than his carpentry tools, hoping to bring his wife and first-born son to Canada as soon as possible. His first years in Ontario after arriving were difficult. Bruckmann was hired by Metro Marine in Bronte, Ontario, working for Harry D. Greb, building and repairing wooden boats, working with Jan Gudgeon and Vic Carpenter. Metro Marine had evolved into a first-class yacht yard under the direction of John “Johnnie” Walker and, after a short time, Erich Bruckmann was made Shop Superintendent. While at Metro Marine Bruckmann oversaw the construction of several Cuthbertson & Cassian designs, including the 38-foot La Mouette, a wooden design built for Gord Fisher of the Royal Canadian Yacht Club, which led to a semi-production series.

In 1962 Bruckmann left Metro Marine in Bronte to found his own cabinetmaking business, ostensibly to build kitchen cabinets and counters, but he had undertaken several yacht jobs, including completion of a Canadian Northern CN35 from a Cuthbertson & Cassian design. His skills had become known and appreciated.

=== Red Jacket (1964) ===
Canadian yachtsman Perry Connolly asked George Cuthbertson of Cuthbertson & Cassian to design a custom 40 ft (12 m) racing sloop for him. The design directive called for flat-out speed. Connolly said he wanted "the meanest, hungriest 40-footer afloat".

As a result of a connection through his earlier relationship with Metro Marine, Bruckmann was asked to build this new boat, named Red Jacket, from the design by Cuthbertson. Starting in 1963 and through 1964 Red Jacket, was built by Erich Bruckmann at Bruckmann Manufacturing in fiberglass with a balsa core, the resulting structure was strong, stiff and significantly lighter than the wood or solid fiberglass yachts then sailing. Red Jacket is considered to be the first sailboat engineered with a cored hull (other earlier boats had balsa-cored decks and powerboat builders were then using it in transoms and superstructures). No doubt the weight savings and panel stiffness of her cored hull contributed significantly to her racing success. She was launched in May 1966 and took 11 of 13 starts that summer. That winter, Red Jacket headed south and won the famed SORC (Southern Ocean Racing Conference), also called "the circuit," which was a series of six races with the major two being from St. Petersburg to Fort Lauderdale and from Miami to Nassau, competing against over 85 of the best racers of the day. She is still actively raced by her owners, members the Royal Canadian Yacht Club.

=== C&C Yachts Ltd. ===
That victory was quickly followed by a successful defence of the Canada’s Cup with Manitou in 1969. This racing success resulted in the formation of C&C Yachts in the same year with the amalgamation of the design firm and the three builders producing Cuthbertson & Cassian designs.

In September 1969 the design firm of Cuthbertson & Cassian Ltd. joined with Belleville Marine Yard, Hinterhoeller Ltd. and Bruckmann Manufacturing to form C&C Yachts. In that first year C&C achieved sales of $3.9 million.

=== C&C Custom Division ===
As a result of this merger, it operated as the C&C Custom Yachts Division in Oakville with Erich Bruckmann assuming responsibility for custom manufacturing and mold development.During that time, C&C Custom Yachts built some 200 custom and semi-custom boats, including many renowned racing and cruising yachts.

Under Bruckmann the Custom Shop built such Cuthbertson & Cassian designs as the Redline 41, C&C 43-1, C&C 50, and the successful C&C 61. The Redline 41 Condor would follow Red Jacket's lead and win SORC overall in 1971. In the year of the merger Erich Bruckmann's custom shop was doing well financially. In 1966-67, meticulous craftsmanship had seen only three yachts completed; an ongoing expansion increased its output of semi-custom yachts alone to 62 annually.

The pinnacle of the Custom Division career came at the 1971 SORC, where boats designed by Cuthbertson & Cassian not only won overall but also claimed victory in three of the five divisions—a remarkable achievement unmatched by any other designer.

==== Evergreen (1977) ====
The ground breaking yacht Evergreen, Canada's Cup winner and Fastnet survivor, was perhaps Bruckmann's most recognized achievement.

The Canada's Cup winner in 1978 was a C&C design, the Two Ton class Evergreen, owned by Don Green with Hans Fogh at the helm. The design was a radical, dinghy-like, 41-foot boat, designed with the aim of winning the trophy as the C&C design team had exploited loopholes in the regatta rules. As one example, the galley was required to have sink but, in order to save weight, it had no drain, which the rule makers had not thought to specify. The deck hatches opened inward, which could be a safety hazard if they gave way during a capsize or broach, and the Evergreen crew faced protests over this defect in both the SORC and in the Canada's Cup. Upon reflection over the 1979 Fastnet race in which he participated but prudently DNF'ed, Skipper Green later said that Evergreen "never should have gone to England" for the Admiral's Cup, which is the destination of most Canada's Cup winners. Canadian Yachting magazine stated fifteen years later that "few yachts have created more controversy than" Evergreen, and that "its extreme design and controversial features ruffled feathers around the world." After the competition that year, the rule books were rewritten to preclude safety problems like those raised by the design of Evergreen, and as a result, C&C never received another commission for a Canada's Cup yacht.

==== Archangel (1980) ====
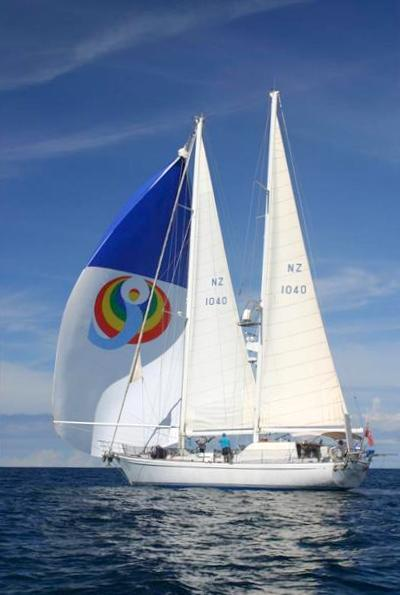
C&C Custom 67 Archangel

The C&C Custom 67 is a Canadian sailboat, that was designed by Robert W. Ball of C&C Yachts and was launched and named Archangel in September 1980.

The boat was built by Bruckmann and his crew at the C&C Yachts Custom Division in Oakville. She remains the largest pleasureboat commission ever received by C&C, and was an enormous project: six months in design and 14 months in construction. Only one example was completed.

== Retirement ==
Bruckmann did some consulting work for C&C Yachts in Niagara-on-the-Lake.

In 1986 Bruckmann's son Mark decided to reinvent Bruckmann Manufacturing. Mark Bruckmann reopened the company in the former Metro Marine building - the same place where his father started so many years before, and Erich Bruckmann helped Mark to re-establish in 1986.

== Death ==
Erich Bruckmann died 28 October 2011 at Joseph Brant Memorial Hospital in Burlington, Ontario, of tuberculosis.

== Awards ==
Erich Bruckmann was awarded the Canadian Yachting Magazine, Ontario Sailing, 2011 Legends of Ontario Sailing Award as one of the “Builders of C&C Yachts”

== See also ==
- List of sailboat designers and manufacturers
