= Royal Canadian Yacht Club =

Yacht club in Toronto, Canada

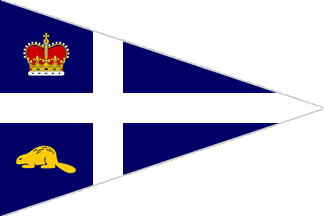
- Burgee
- Short name: RCYC
- Founded: 1852; 174 years ago
- Location: Toronto, Ontario, Canada
- Commodore: Tyler Meyrick
- Website: www.rcyc.ca

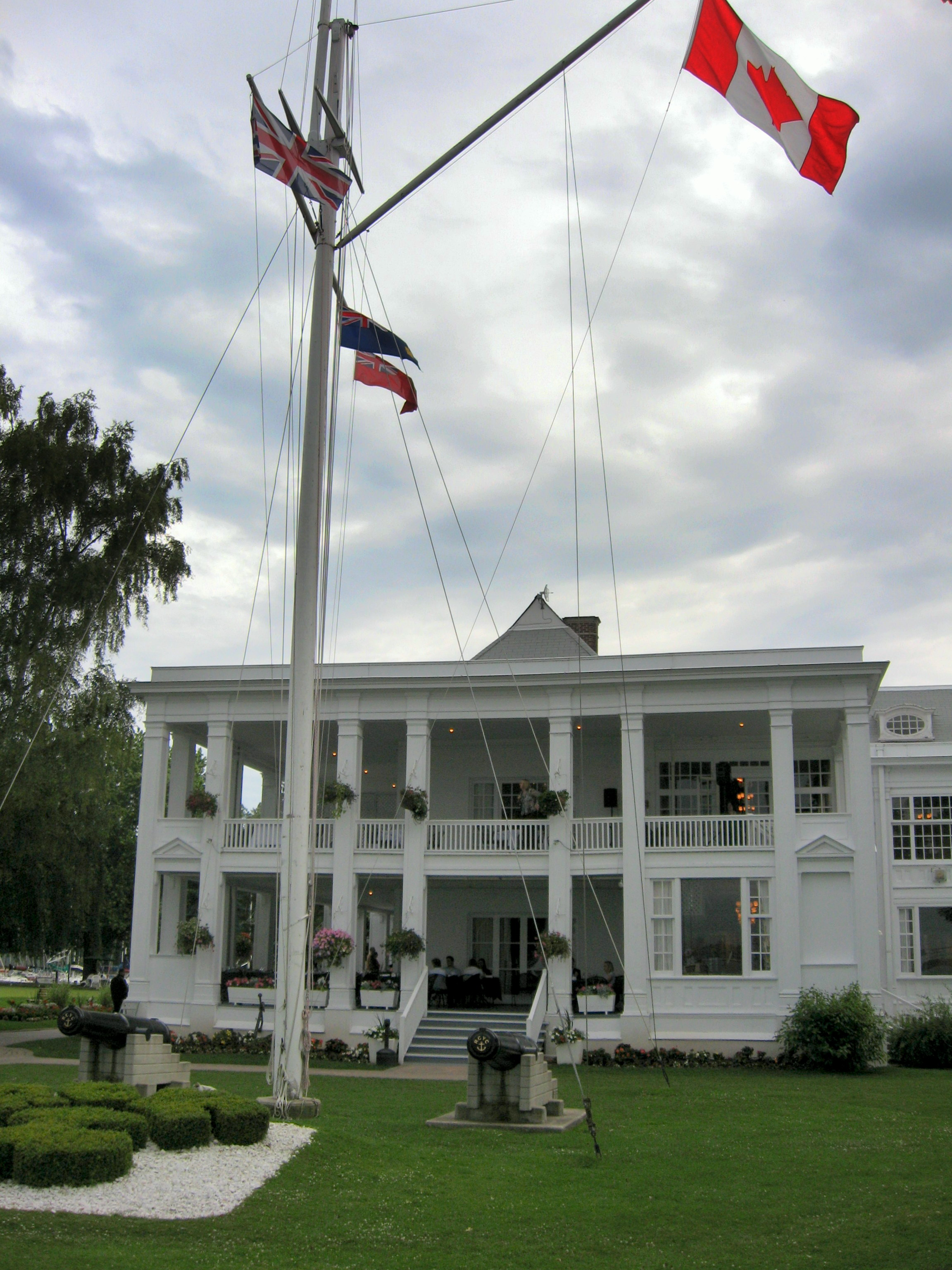
The foundation stone for the current island clubhouse was laid in 1919 by Prince Edward, Prince of Wales (later King Edward VIII)

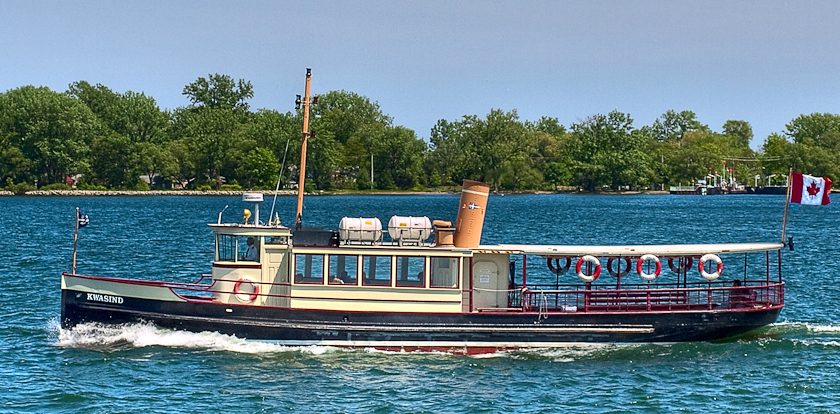
Kwasind (1912), Royal Canadian Yacht Club launch built by Polson Iron Works

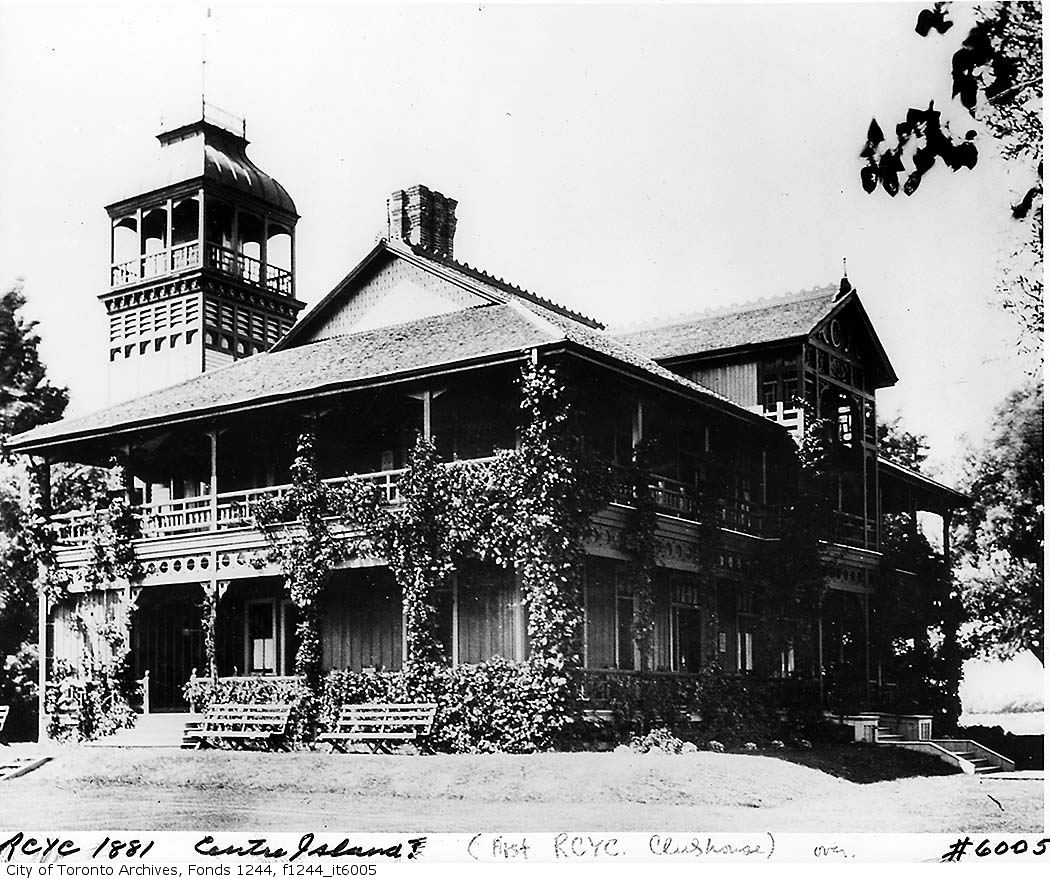
RCYC's first island clubhouse, 1881

The Royal Canadian Yacht Club (RCYC) is a private yacht club in Toronto, Ontario, Canada. Founded in 1852, it is one of the world's older and larger yacht clubs. Its summer home is on a trio of islands (RCYC Island, South Island and North Chippewa or Snug Island) in the Toronto Islands. Its winter home since 1984 has been a purpose-built clubhouse located at 141 St. George Street in Toronto (just north of Bloor Street), which includes facilities for sports and social activities. In 2014, the club had approximately 4700 members, about 450 yachts (95% sail) and a number of dinghies, principally International 14s.

The Club Patron is Anne, Princess Royal.

== Objects ==
The objects of the club are:

1. to encourage members to become proficient in the personal management, maintenance, control and handling of their yachts, in navigation, and in all matters pertaining to seamanship;
2. to promote yacht architecture, building and sailing in Canadian waters;
3. to promote excellence in competitive sailing; and
4. to promote such other sports and social activities as may be desirable in the interest of members generally.

== History ==
=== From founding to 1896 ===
At an informal meeting in 1850, eight local citizens laid the foundation for the Toronto Boat Club. The club was formally established in 1852.

In 1853, the club revised its name to the Toronto Yacht Club. On the advice of its patron, Lord Elgin, the club changed its name to the Canadian Yacht Club later in 1853. That same year, the club petitioned the Crown for a Royal warrant. The petition was granted by Queen Victoria, and the club became known as the Royal Canadian Yacht Club. Although there is conflicting evidence about the reason behind the change in name from Toronto Yacht Club to Canadian Yacht Club, the most credible explanation is that the club wished to signify its regional rather than merely local significance. Since the City of Toronto was then located in the Canada West area of the Province of Canada, "Toronto" gave way to "Canadian" in the club's name.

The first clubhouse was established in a building owned by Sir Casimir Gzowski, near the present site of Union Station. After a short tenancy, the club moved to a one-storey building erected on a scow moored just east of Simcoe Street. This served from 1853 until 1858, when it was replaced by the steamer Provincial. The Provincial provided shelter until the end of 1868, when it escaped its mooring, drifted away with the winter ice and was blown up as a hazard to navigation.

In 1869, the club built a clubhouse adjacent to the Parliament Buildings on Front Street. In 1881, a clubhouse by architect Frank Darling of Darling & Curry was completed on the Toronto Islands at the site of the present clubhouse, since "the increasing number of railway tracks had completely changed the character of the Esplanade … originally … flanked by handsome residences and the bright blue waters of the Bay." To reach the new location, the club purchased the clipper-bowed steam launch Esperanza and secured landing rights at the foot of Yonge Street, which it held until 1953 (evolution of the waterfront led to further moves — to York Street until 1979, then to Parliament Street until 2011, when the present launch station was established on Cherry Street). The 1881 building burned in 1904; at that time, buildings, predominantly built of wood, were heated by coal stoves and lit by lanterns and gas lighting, thus fires were frequent and the building standard was founded on an expected average life of 20 years.

While club buildings were rising up and burning down, the members were engaged in racing. The club challenged for the America's Cup in 1876, and while the Countess of Dufferin was unsuccessful on the water, her owner was more successful at the negotiating table, and weaned the New York Yacht Club from its habit of requiring the challenger to race against its entire fleet.

In 1878, the club's yachts were granted the privilege of wearing the Blue Ensign, defaced with a crown in the fly. This endured, with a break for both the First and Second World Wars, until the advent of the new maple leaf flag of Canada in 1965.

As the club's yachts grew increasingly sophisticated, members' tastes in designs diverged. Early examples hewed closely to the extreme British plank-on-edge style that relied on ballast, not hull-form, for stability. As the century wore on, Canadian designers such as Alexander Cuthbert and A. Cary Smith began to incorporate more of the features of American yachts, such as form-based stability and centreboards. Members were also looking back to Britain for well-rounded designs from such notables as George Lennox Watson and William Fife.

In 1896, Lincoln Park Yacht Club of Chicago challenged the RCYC to a series of match races. Interest was such that several cities vied for the contest – Toledo, Ohio won with the offer of a large cash prize and a splendid trophy by Tiffany & Co. The RCYC yacht Canada, designed by William Fife and sailed under Æmilius Jarvis, defeated Vencedor and won the cash and cup. The Canada owners' syndicate then donated the cup to the club for perpetual cross-border competition, and the Canada's Cup has since then been "the Great Lakes' most prestigious trophy" and an emblem of the club's commitment to yacht racing.

=== 1896 to 1969 ===
The 1881 clubhouse burned in 1904. A new building by Henry Sproatt was completed in 1906 but burned in 1918. The remains served until completion of the present building to a slightly modified version of Sproatt's design in 1922.

By 1900, yacht design had progressed to the point that a new measurement rule was required. A lakes-specific rule and scantlings were published, but never built to. Eventually, Æmilius Jarvis in 1910 built the very successful Swamba, an R-class by George Owen that was the first vessel built to the new Universal Rule on Lake Ontario. She was followed by Patricia, a P-Boat also designed to the new Rule by Owen.

Like most yacht clubs in Britain and the Empire, the club was conceived as an auxiliary to the Royal Navy (hence the naval titles and uniforms), a source of political support and if the need arose, of men familiar with boats. In the days when the Royal Navy fought under sail and yachting was a new idea, "in the building and racing of fast pleasure craft, the Navy… received the benefit of experience and experiment… not possible… under service conditions". When the First World War came in 1914, the services were short of lead for weapons, and many members patriotically dismantled their boats and gave their keels to be melted. Canada disappeared at this time.

As elsewhere, there was a rush to enlist; at the peak, over 450 members were in the services. 59 of the club's members died in service. In commemoration, the club in 1926 installed a large granite, marble and bronze memorial, designed by Charles J. Gibson in the form of a ship's capstan on a low podium on the front lawn, to honour those who had not returned. (The names of the 23 who did not return from the Second World War were added in 1952.)

The club rebuilt its fleet at the First World War's end, first with the purchase of four P-Boats in 1919, which were then sold to members, then the acquisition of a number of one-design 25-footers known as the C-Boats. These one-design sloops, designed by TBF Benson, fostered close club and inter-club racing, raising everyone's skill and pleasure. The Universal Rule's leaning toward large and costly boats, though, called out for a new approach. The first club boat to the new International Rule was the 6-Metre Merenneito. The new Rule so impressed members that three 8-Metres were built to challenge for the Canada's Cup: Vision (Camper & Nicholsons); Quest (William Fife); and Norseman (William Roué). A fourth Eight, Invader II was built but was no more successful. Star boats joined the fleet in 1935. At about that time, the 14-footer fleet, precursor to the International 14, formed.

The club was quiet through the war years 1939 to 1945, but rebounded with peace (and generous fee rebates to those who had served). Expanding membership required expansion of the leasehold over the whole of South Island. In 1954, Venture II reclaimed the Canada's Cup, ending 51 years at the Rochester Yacht Club. The same year, Hurricane Hazel badly damaged the Toronto waterfront; yachts were then moved from moorings in the harbour to docks in the lagoons between the islands.

=== 1967 to present ===
The second objective of the club is to "promote yacht architecture, building and sailing…" In the 1930s, 1940s and 1950s, the club's greatest contribution was through the continuing development of the Fourteen class by TBF Benson, Charlie Bourke, and Fred Buller, making a significant contribution to the present International 14. Buller, who was head of aeronautical design at de Havilland Canada deserves special mention, having realized that the tell-tales used to analyze airflow over aircraft could be used to advantage on sails. Buller is credited with originating and popularizing their use, initially in the 14 class, but the idea spread rapidly.

In 1967, Perry Connolly, a club member asked another member, George Cuthbertson, and his partner, George Cassian, to design "the meanest, hungriest 40-footer afloat." Fibreglass was displacing wood as the material of choice by that time, but hulls and decks were solid glass, thus heavy. The new boat, Red Jacket, was designed and built with a hull and deck cored with balsa, a first in North America; light weight combined with a fin keel and all-movable rudder made her faster and handier than her contemporaries. In her first year on the lake, the new boat took 11 of 13 events entered. In her second year, she took top spot at Florida's Southern Ocean Racing Circuit. The prestige of this and other high-visibility conquests, such as Manitou's defence of the Canada's Cup was a springboard for a new partnership of designers and builders under the name C&C Yachts. C&C, at one time the largest yacht builder in the world, used balsa core in all of its many models, validating cored-laminate technology that is now used in most yachts, racing or cruising. Yachting use of cored laminates arguably led to aviation's re-discovery of the concept; after a decades-long hiatus, cored composites are now used in most aircraft. Club members retained a close relationship with the company until the sale of its name to US interests.

In the late 1970s, a group of members engaged designer Mark Ellis (yacht designer) and builder George Hinterhoeller to make six 30-foot (9.1 metres) cruising yachts that could comfortably be sailed by one person. The Nonsuch series (named for Henry Hudson's vessel) had the beamy looks of a traditional U.S. East Coast cat-boat, the underbody of a modern cruising yacht, much sail and the accommodations of a much larger yacht. Eventually, nearly a thousand were built, from 22 to 36 feet (6.8 to 10.9 metres).

During the first half of the 1980s, the club's International 14 fleet championed the development of a series of designs by member Jay Cross. Powerful and readily planed, Cross designs dominated the North American 14 fleet.

Sailing wing-sail catamarans designed by former C&C Yachts designer Steve Killing, club member Fred Eaton won the International C-Class Catamaran Championship, sailed at RCYC in 2007 and at New York Yacht Club, Newport, Rhode Island, USA in 2010. Early development included foiling vessels that were unsuccessful against immersed hulls in light Lake Ontario airs. Eaton's team's development progress and the direct participation or observation by AC team members in the 2010 event significantly influenced the decision to sail the 2013 America's Cup in wing-sail catamarans.

In the summer of 2015, the club hosted sailing events for the 2015 Pan American Games.

== Olympic sailors ==
Eleven RCYC members have won an Olympic medal, with the first being won in 1984. RCYC member and coach Pat Healy guided the Canadian Sailing team through three Olympic games in which medals were won in 1984, 1988 and 1992.

== Facilities ==
In summer, the club occupies three islands in the chain that forms the south side of Toronto harbour. The island clubhouse with its porticoed verandahs, Toronto's largest wooden building, houses a ballroom, dining rooms and other social spaces. Other buildings house the sailing management offices, the junior club, lockers and workspace for the club's mechanics, riggers, woodworkers and marine yard workers. Island activities include sailing lessons for juniors and adults, sailing in club-owned boats, tennis, swimming and lawn bowling. There is an extensive chef’s garden cared for by about 25 volunteers as well as an extensive rose garden which dates back to the early 1940s

The island clubhouse is linked to the city by a launch service operated by two notable launches, both over a century old and built for the club. The Hiawatha built in 1895 and the Kwasind built in 1912 which sail from a dock on the Ship Channel of the Toronto Harbour where it meets Cherry Street.

With its merger with the Carlton Club in 1974, the club gained a winter home in the city (and the addition of racquet sports to its attractions). Ten years later in 1984, the new city clubhouse, opened at 141 St. George St. in the Annex. It is an all-year facility, and provides dining and social spaces, squash and badminton courts, fitness and other facilities.

== Model collection ==
RCYC possesses one of the finest collections of yacht models in North America, in spite of clubhouse fires in 1896, 1904 and 1918 that consumed many valuable examples. The model of Minota was deliberately preserved with the marks of the 1918 fire.

The collection now includes over 170 models, about half displayed in the City Clubhouse Model Room with the remainder elsewhere in the City Clubhouse or in the Island Clubhouse. The Island's Flagship Room displays some three dozen models of past Commodores' yachts while the Eight-Metre Room shows a dozen of the type. Fifteen Fourteen-footer and International 14 models in the City Club bar provide the most comprehensive available guide to the class's development over a 100-year span.

== Notable members ==
- Edward Blake PC KC - Premier of Ontario
- Perry Connolly - contractor
- Edward Roper Curzon Clarkson - founding partner of accounting firm Clarkson Gordon
- George Harding Cuthbertson - yacht builder and designer
- Fredrik Stefan Eaton - businessman and philanthropist
- Sir John Craig Eaton - businessman and philanthropist
- Sir William Glenholme Falconbridge KC - Chief Justice Ontario High Court
- Jim Flaherty PC MSC - Finance Minister of Canada
- SirJoseph Flavelle 1st Bt - Industrialist and Baronet
- George Horace Gooderham - distillery owner and politician
- Sir Casimir Gzowski KCMG- Lieutenant Governor of Ontario
- Paul Henderson - Olympic sailor
- Edward Æmilius Jarvis - business magnate
- Allan Lamport - Mayor of Toronto
- Sir John A. Macdonald GCB PC QC- Prime Minister of Canada
- Lieutenant Colonel Arthur Peuchen - Titanic survivor and military officer
- Paul James Phelan - Chairman of Cara Foods Inc.
- James Henry Plummer - Financier -
- Douglas Tyndall Wright OC - President Emeritus University of Waterloo

== See also ==
- Venues of the 2015 Pan American and Parapan American Games

== Bibliography ==
- Snider, C. H. J., Ovens, Frank Annals of the Royal Canadian Yacht Club Volume I, 1852-1937: Volume 2, 1938-1954; Ovens, Frank, Cuthbertson, G., Mallion, A., Caldwell, C. Annals of the Royal Canadian Yacht Club Volume 3, 1955-2000 (published in a slipcased set) Royal Canadian Yacht Club, 2000
- Snider, C. H. J., Hyland, J. A., Wade, T. K., Bourke, C. W., Kimber, H. A., Sorsoleil, E. G., Reid, G., Standing, H., Wood, S. C., 1852-1952 The Royal Canadian Yacht Club, Royal Canadian Yacht Club, 1952
- Daniel Spurr Heart of Glass - Fiberglass Boats And The Men Who Made Them, International Marine Publishing/McGraw-Hill, 2000
