= Supermac =

Supermac may refer to:

- Precursor technology to AES50
- Harold Macmillan (1894–1986), nicknamed "Supermac", Prime Minister of the United Kingdom from 1957 to 1963
  - Supermac (cartoon), relating to Harold Macmillan the former British Prime Minister
- Malcolm "Supermac" Macdonald (born 1950), a retired English football player and pundit
- Super Mac Race, a 568 mile sailboat race starting in Lake Michigan off Chicago, IL and ending in Lake Huron off Port Huron, MI.
- Supermac's, an Irish fast food chain covering Northern Ireland and the Republic of Ireland
- Supermac Ltd, Belfast, Northern Ireland's first out of town supermarket, opened 1964 and since demolished for Forestside Shopping Centre
- SuperMac, a brand of Macintosh clones made by UMAX
- SuperMac Technologies, a hardware and software company that developed (amongst other things) the Cinepak codec
- Detective Chief Superintendent Charlie "SuperMac" Mackintosh, a character in Ashes to Ashes, a 2009 BBC television drama
