= C&C Custom 62 =

Sailboat class

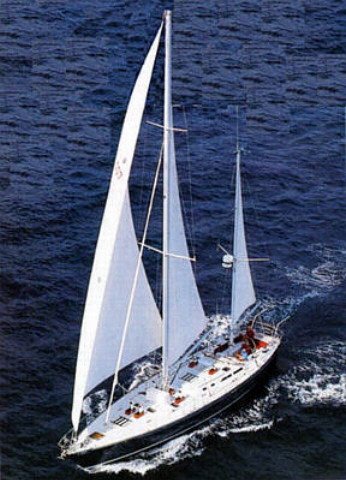
- Jubilation (1981)

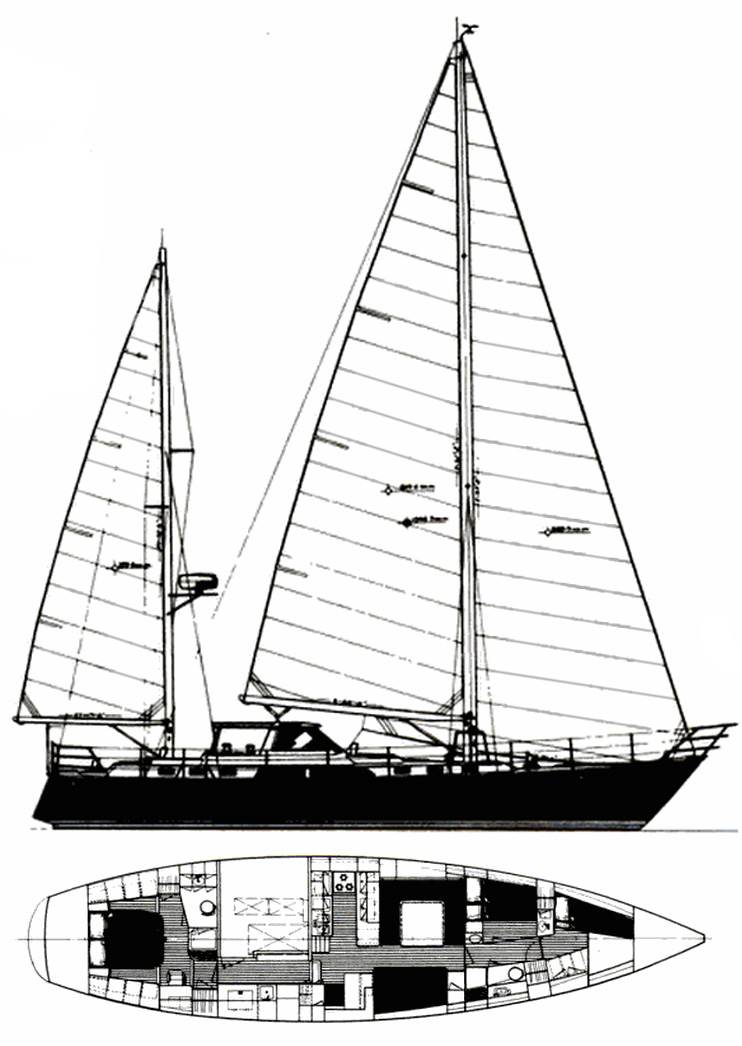

Development
- Designer: Robert W. Ball
- Location: Canada
- Year: 1981
- No. built: two or more
- Builder: C&C Yachts Custom Division
- Role: Long range cruising
- Name: C&C Custom 62

Boat
- Displacement: 65,000 lb (29,484 kg)
- Draft: 6.5 ft (2.0 m) to 8 ft (2.4 m) depending on keel fitted

Hull
- Type: Monohull
- Construction: Fiberglass
- LOA: 62.1 ft (18.9 m)
- LWL: 52.8 ft (16.1 m)
- Beam: 15.2 ft (4.6 m)
- Engine: Caterpillar Inc. 100 hp (75 kW) diesel engine

Hull appendages
- Keel: Centreboard or fin keel
- Ballast: 26,000 lb (11,793 kg)
- Rudder: Internally-mounted spade-type rudder

Rig
- Rig type: Masthead bermuda rig

Sails
- Sailplan: Double headsail ketch
- Total sail area: 1,593 sq ft (148.0 m^{2})

The C&C Custom 62 is a Canadian sailboat, that was designed by Robert W. Ball of C&C Design for long range cruising and first built in 1981.

== Production ==
The design was built under Erich Bruckmann's supervision at the Custom Division of C&C Yachts in Canada, but it is now out of production. At least two examples were built.

The Custom 62 is a development of the C&C 61.

=== Jubilation (1981) ===
The first Custom 62 was built in a conventional aft cockpit layout with the wheel aft of the mizzen and a keel / centreboard arrangement allowing a 6.5 ft (2.0 m) draft with the centreboard up. She has a cherry-wood interior. She was renamed over the years as she changed owners, Djinn, and then Marauder. Marauder was reported destroyed in Hurricane Sandy in New York in 2012.

=== Pegaso (1982) ===
C&C Yachts built at least one other Custom 62 for an American couple, this one as a center cockpit version with an open pilot house. It has a fixed fin keel giving an 8 ft (2.4 m) draft. The boat was named Pegaso and intended for long-range, short-handed sailing, primarily in the Pacific northwest. It has two helm stations, the first in the pilothouse, while the second helm station is aft, just forward of the mizzen mast. The interior is finished in teak with off-white panelling.

The current owners of Pegaso (2019-2025 - Pegaso Yachting Corp) maintain a website where additional information on the boat can be found; see external links below.

== Design ==
The C&C Custom 62 is a recreational keelboat, built predominantly of fiberglass, with double balsawood cores (glass/balsa/glass/balsa/glass), using the same construction method as the C&C 61. The hull has extra reinforcement at the stem, amidships, and transom against potential strikes with submerged objects. It has a double headsail ketch rig, a raked stem, a reverse transom, an internally-mounted spade-type rudder controlled by a wheel via a Wagner hydraulic system with redundant pumps, lines and cylinders.

The boat displaces 65,000 lb (29,484 kg) and carries 26,000 lb (11,793 kg) of ballast. The design has a draft of 8 ft (2.4 m) with the standard keel fitted or, with the keel / centreboard arrangement, 6.5 ft (2.0 m) draft with the centreboard up.

=== Accommodations ===
In Pegaso accommodations include: crew accommodations forward with adjustable pipe berths, a workbench, spares cabinet, and sail bins; a double stateroom with washstand (and head opposite); aft a master stateroom, with a walk-around double berth, large hanging lockers, a desk, and a filing cabinet. An inch-thick port window under the bed allows inspecting the feathering propeller. The salon has a U-dinette table and extensive bookshelves with a settee and pilot berth opposite.

The galley is on the port side, has a "U" shape, with three sinks, a range powered by propane and a large oven. It also has a toaster, microwave oven and a top-opening refrigerator and freezer.

Marauder's interior was laid out somewhat differently.

=== Systems (Pegaso) ===
Main engine: fitted with a Caterpillar Inc. diesel engine of 100 hp (75 kW), turning a Luke 30x24 feathering propeller and carries fuel for a 3,000 mi (4,800 km) motoring range.

Electrics: There are two Onan generators of 7.5 kW (10 hp) to power the freezer and clothes drier.

Navigation Equipment:

In pilot house:

- Brooks & Gatehouse instruments
- Wagner autopilot
- Compass

Navigation station in saloon:

- Furuno alarm radar
- Furuno weatherfax
- Magnavox Satellite navigation
- Northstar Loran-C
- Brooks & Gatehouse Hadrian course computer
- 2 of ICOM 720A transceivers
- Sailor Marine VHF radio

== Operational history ==
In a review for Yachting magazine, in May 1983, David Weatherston wrote: "My sea trial aboard Pegaso, on Lake Ontario last November, proved the yacht worthy of her racing heritage. She was responsive, even in a seaway. She tracked smoothly. And under autopilot she required very little corrective steering. On a reach, in brisk conditions, she carried her sail area stiffly, and with an easy motion that would keep any crew in high spirits."

A review in May 1983 in Cruising World magazine stated, "Like all other boats produced from their yard, the 62 combines good looks, performance and comfortable living space. It's good to see that a reputable production yard is making the extra effort to tailor large yachts to owners' needs —certainly they have the experience and skill."

== Popular culture ==
The Custom 62, Pegaso, was featured in a book, Just the Two of Us, by Alicia Blodgett, a book about sailing, about a newlywed couple's adjustment to life at sea and each other, through 47 countries and 45,000 miles. The book was published by Summit in 1999.

Of Pegaso, Bill Blodgett, husband and sailing partner of Alicia Blodgett, said:

My tribute to Pegaso is she carried its two different Mom and Pop owners around the world safely and comfortably while averaging 200 miles a day crossing the Pacific.

== See also ==
- List of sailing boat types
