= Kwasind =

Canadian passenger ferry, 1912 onwards

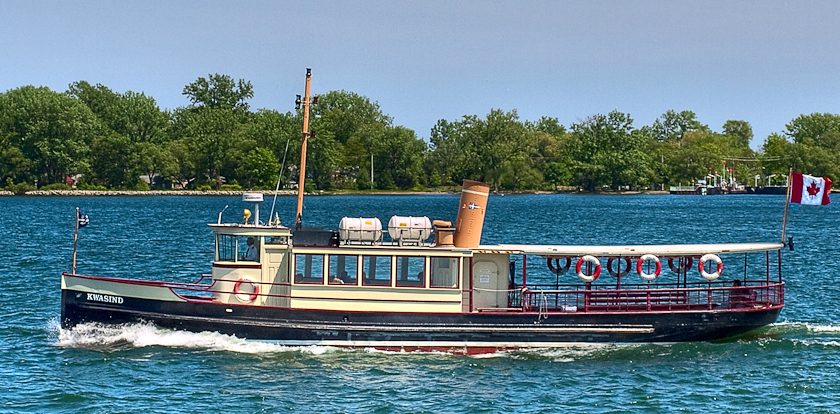
- Kwasind, Royal Canadian Yacht Club Ferry

History

Canada
- Name: Kwasind
- Owner: Royal Canadian Yacht Club
- Builder: Polson Iron Works Ltd., Toronto
- Launched: 1912
- In service: 27 June 1912
- Identification: Official number: 130318
- Status: in active service

General characteristics
- Tonnage: 46.96 GT; 31.94 NT
- Length: 71 ft (22 m)
- Beam: 15 ft (4.6 m)
- Propulsion: 1 × Polson fore & aft compound steam engine, 8.16 nhp (1912); 1 × Caterpillar diesel engine, 115 bhp (86 kW) (1946); 1 shaft

Kwasind is a passenger ferry built in 1912 for the Royal Canadian Yacht Club, in Toronto, Ontario, Canada. She is 71 feet (22 m) long. She was built by the Polson Iron Works and cost CA$13,000. Her name was taken from Henry Wadsworth Longfellow's poem about Hiawatha, as the yacht club's previous ferry is Hiawatha.

Kwasind has served as a ferry for the yacht club since 1912. She was converted from a steam engine to a diesel engine in the 1940s.

On July 29, 2000, both Kwasind, and the yacht club's older ferry, Hiawatha, were sunk by vandals. The Kwasind was refloated, and was back in working order the day of the sinking, while Hiawatha required further repair.
