= Mary Tavy =

Village in Devon, England

Coordinates: 50.59141°N 4.12051°W

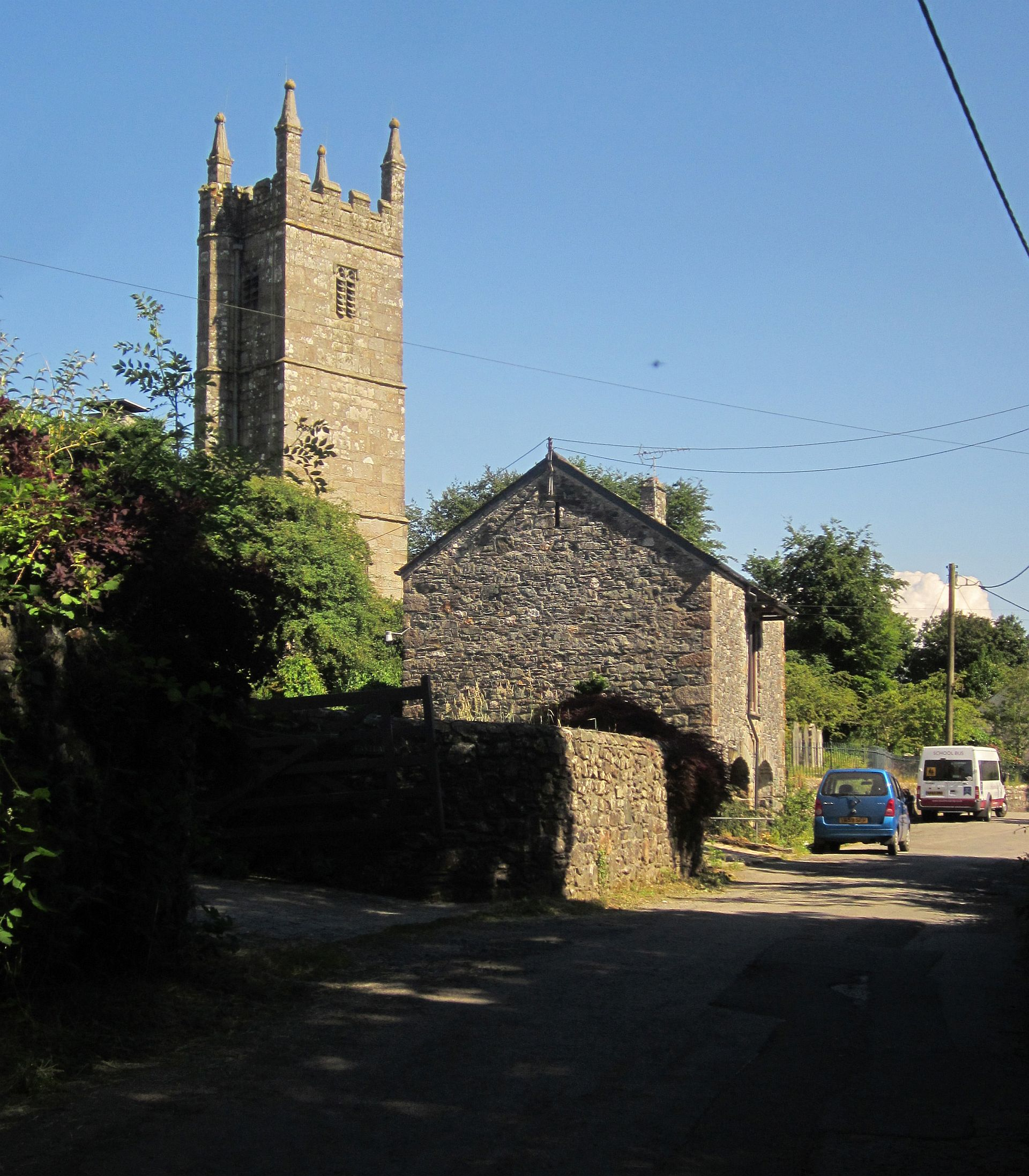
- Barn and church, Mary Tavy

- Location within Devon
- Population: 600 approx
- OS grid reference: SX5079
- Civil parish: Mary Tavy
- District: West Devon
- Shire county: Devon
- Region: South West
- Country: England
- Sovereign state: United Kingdom
- Post town: TAVISTOCK
- Postcode district: PL19
- Police: Devon and Cornwall
- Fire: Devon and Somerset
- Ambulance: South Western
- UK Parliament: Torridge and West Devon

Mary Tavy (/ˈteɪvi/) is a village with a population of around 600, located four miles north of Tavistock in the West Devon district, in Devon, England; it is named after the River Tavy. There is an electoral ward with the same name. Its population at the 2011 census was 1,559. Mary Tavy used to be home to the world's largest copper mine Wheal Friendship, as well as a number of lead and tin mines. It lies within Dartmoor National Park. The village lies a mile or two north of Peter Tavy; both were shown as separate settlements in the Domesday Book entry of 1086.

St Mary's Parish Church has a pinnacled west tower built of granite, a south porch with old wagon roof and a south transept built in 1893.

To deter highwaymen from attacking travellers along the road between Tavistock and Okehampton, captured highwaymen were hanged from a gibbet on what is now known as 'Gibbet Hill'.

Mary Tavy hydro-electric power station was built in the 1930s. The station uses water from reservoirs to generate electricity. The Mary Tavy set is rated at 2,622 kW, the Chagford set is rated at 26 kW and the Morwelham set at 700 kW. In the year 1980-81 the total electricity output was 11.91 GWh.

== Notable people ==
- The topographer William Crossing was for part of his life resident at Mary Tavy, and is buried in the churchyard of St Mary.
- The British-Canadian financier James Henry Plummer was born here.
- The YouTube content producer Sjin was brought up here.

== Transport ==
=== Road ===
Mary Tavy sits on the A386 which runs up to Okehampton in the North and Plymouth via Tavistock in the South. A30 dual carriageway is the nearest fast route.

=== Bus Services ===
Mary Tavy is served by Dartline's 118 between Tavistock and Okehampton.

Many years ago C. J. Down Coaches who are based in Mary Tavy used to run the service, however they haven't for many years and closed for good in 2023 after 100 years.

=== Coach Services ===
Lomax Tours run coach excursions throughout the year from Mary Tavy to places of interest such as Bath Christmas Market, Lyme Regis etc.
