= C&C 61 =

Sailboat class

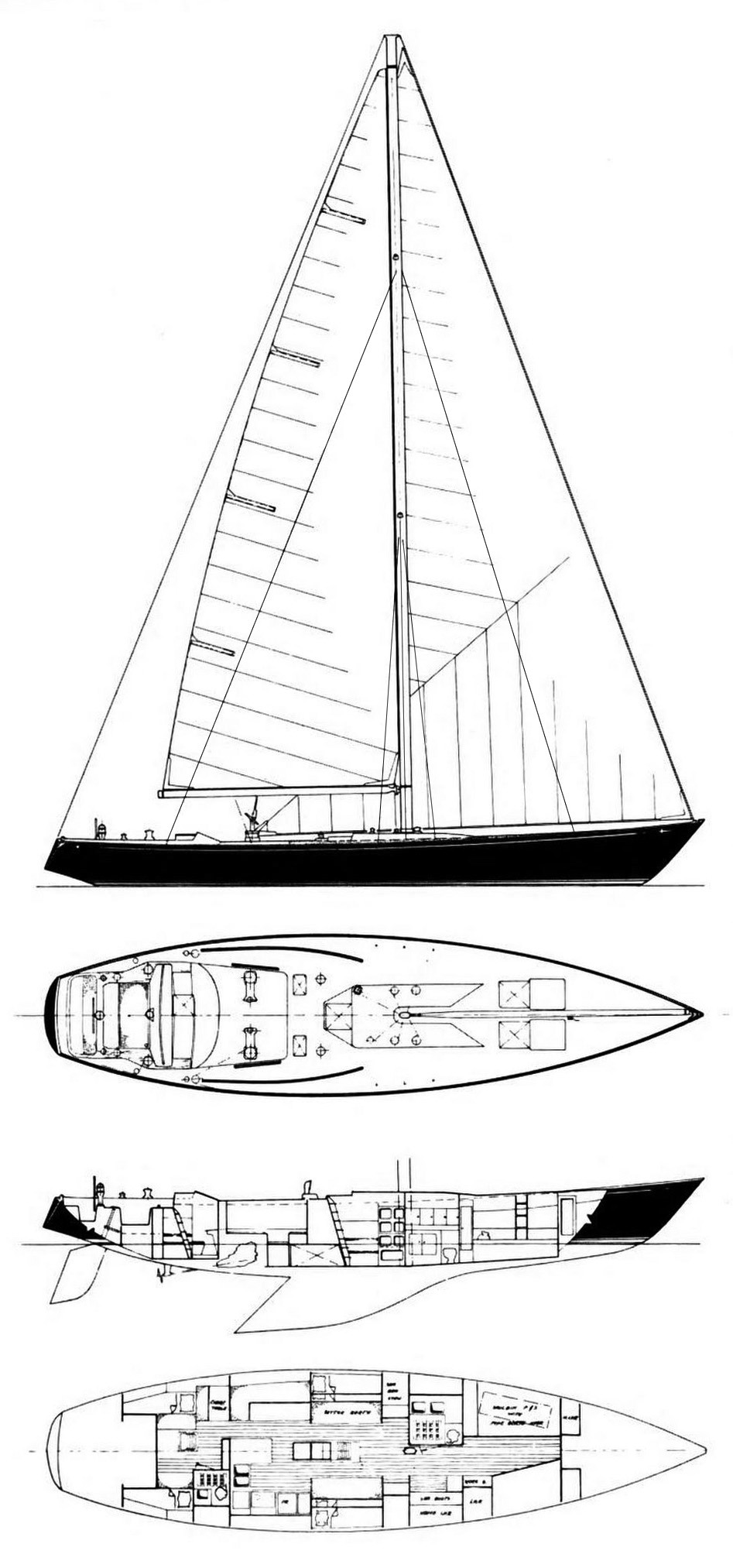
- Sorcery (1970)

Development
- Designer: Cuthbertson & Cassian
- Location: Canada
- Year: 1970
- No. built: 9
- Builder: C&C Yachts
- Role: ocean racing / cruising

Boat
- Displacement: 57,298 lb (25,990 kg)
- Draft: 8.25 ft (2.51 m)
- Air draft: varies with boat 83–93 ft (25–28 m)

Hull
- Type: Monohull
- Construction: Fiberglass
- LOA: 61.25 ft (18.67 m)
- LWL: 50.00 ft (15.24 m)
- Beam: 15.08 ft (4.60 m)
- Engine: Inboard diesel

Hull appendages
- Keel: swept fin keel
- Ballast: lead 22,178 lb (10,060 kg)
- Rudder: internally-mounted spade-type rudder

Rig
- General: sloop or ketch
- Rig type: Bermuda rig
- I foretriangle height: 75.00 ft (22.86 m)
- J foretriangle base: 26.00 ft (7.92 m)
- P mainsail luff: 67.00 ft (20.42 m)
- E mainsail foot: 22.00 ft (6.71 m)

Sails
- Sailplan: Masthead rig
- Mainsail area: 975.00 sq ft (90.580 m^{2})
- Jib/genoa area: 737.00 sq ft (68.470 m^{2})
- Total sail area: 1,712.00 sq ft (159.050 m^{2})

The C&C 61 is a Canadian sailboat, that was designed by Cuthbertson & Cassian and first built in 1970.

== Production ==
The boat was built by C&C Yachts, at Erich Bruckmann's custom shop at Bronte, Ontario, Canada, starting in 1970. During its production run, a total of nine examples were completed, though it is possible the last two 61s credited as built were actually constructed and registered as 62 ft (19 m) ketches (see C&C Custom 62).

The preliminary lines, sail plan, and accommodation drawings were completed in 1968 (Dwgs. #68-7-1P, -2P, -3P, -4P). In a letter from George Cuthbertson to Dariend Murray, publisher of The Dinghy, a magazine from Venice, California, on the development of the first C&C 61, and Cuthbertson commented, in part:

You will notice that on various drawings reference is made to C&C 61 design. SORCERY, for James F. Bladwin, and CAMPAIGNE for T.K. Fisher. It's all the same! The design was originally commissioned by Tom Fisher of Detroit whose object was a fast cruiser capable of handling the 12 meters of the day on a boat-for-boat basis. Specifically, he had ideas of being consistently first to finish in New York Yacht Club cruises, which of course meant getting there ahead of the 12's. However, since his home waters were to be Lake St. Clair, he imposed the stringent draft restriction of eight feet. In the longer term, he had hoped to campaign the yacht internationally - hence her name. Mr. Fisher did not proceed with construction as crew "complications" set in. At that time (1969), this firm, C&C Yachts Limited, was being "assembled" from four small firms and we took the decision to go ahead with tooling for the 61 - to the best of my knowledge the largest production fibreglass boat of the time.

The first C&C 61 was ordered by James F. Baldwin of Oyster Bay, New York, and named Sorcery. Sorcery was launched in Bronte, Ontario, early in November 1970, sailed her trials, then headed south. In her first race (St. Petersburg-Venice) she fulfilled her initial objective, finishing first by about a two-hour margin.

== Design ==
The C&C 61 is a recreational keelboat, built predominantly of fiberglass, with wood trim. Most examples produced have a masthead sloop rig, though at least one, possible as many as three, were constructed with a ketch rig. The C&C 61 has an internally-mounted spade-type rudder and a fixed swept fin keel. It displaces 57,298 lb (25,990 kg) and carries 22,178 lb (10,060 kg) of ballast.

The boat has a draft of 8.25 ft (2.51 m) with the standard keel fitted. It is fitted with an inboard engine for docking and maneuvering.

The design has a hull speed of 9.64 kn (17.85 km/h).

== Operational history ==
There have been several notable C&C 61 racing sailboats:

=== Sorcery (1970) ===
Sorcery, the first C&C 61 completed, was a Southern Ocean Racing Conference (SORC) Champion. Her first owner had her built intending to race her extensively, especially in the SORC, which is in part where her name originated (SORCery). Her first race was the initial SORC event: start off at St. Petersburg, down Tampa Bay, then south to a buoy off Boca Grande, then north to finish at Venice, Florida, for a total of 110 miles (180 kilometres). By the time the fleet of more than 80 racers sailed under the Sunshine Skyway Bridge, Sorcery was in the lead, followed closely by Manitou, C&C's 1969 Canada's Cup winner. When Sorcery took line honours, crossing the finish line just after dawn, only one sail was in sight astern. That was Ted Turner, sailing his 12-metre American Eagle.

Sorcery had highly successful racing season in 1971: first in class, first overall in the Annapolis-Newport Race; first in class, fourth overall in the Marblehead to Halifax Ocean Race; first in class, first overall in the SORC's St. Petersburg-Venice event; first in class, first overall in the Monhegan Race, winner of the Whittemore Trophy; first in class in the Block Island Race; and first in class, first overall in the Sandy Hook to Chesapeake event. She went on to achieve distinction in SORC and in many other events around the world, from the Solent to Australia to Japan. In one example, in 1974 Sorcery took both first-to-finish and first on corrected time in the biennial Los Angeles-to-Tahiti Race sponsored by the Transpacific Yacht Club. Sorcery finished the 3,571 mi (5,747 km) race in 18 days, 11 hours, and 13 minutes even, finishing almost two whole days ahead of the nearest competitor.

Socery was rolled by a rogue wave in the North Pacific in 1976 while returning from Japan, and while she was dismasted, she survived with little other damage. On arrival in Victoria, British Columbia, she was fitted with a new mast and departed immediately, competing in the Victoria to Maui Yacht Race, where she took third in class, ninth overall.

In 1989 the Lane Family (Dianne Lane, her husband Robb, and their two young children) of San Diego, California, US, purchased Sorcery. They sailed her from San Diego to Mexico, then cruised the world on her for the next six and a half years, crossing the Pacific and eventually the Indian Ocean. Their first hurricane season was spent living in New Zealand; the second in the Marshall Islands in the Central Pacific; the third in Australia; and the last one in Richards Bay in South Africa. Sorcery then returned the Lane family to the USA, at Cape Fear N.C. in 1999.

Sorcery is an integral part of the book "From Where We Sail", written by Dianne Lane.

=== Robon III (1971) ===
Robon III, the second C&C 61 constructed, was the first boat to finish from a field of 178 boats that started the 1972 Newport Bermuda Race, a particularly difficult race that was sailed predominately upwind in winds in excess of 70 kn (81 mph; 130 km/h). This was the shakedown for the 61-footer as Robon III had been commissioned on Lake Ontario by C&C just 17 days before the race start. Skipper Robert H. Grant and his crew pushed the brand new C&C 61 in its first race ever to also win Class A. Robon’s competitors included some of the finest sailboats of the time, including the much larger Windward Passage, Blackfin, and Ondine. When Robon III reported in at the finish line, "There was much confusion because they thought we were Windward Passage and much too small to be first to finish. The overall winner was Noryema VIII, a production Swan 48; the first non-US yacht ever to win the Bermuda Race. "

=== Ketch (1972) ===
Ketch was the first C&C 61 produced with a ketch sailplan. She sailed under the name Ketch for a number of years, but was later renamed Shear Terror as the family yacht of American artist Anne P. Waddell who lived aboard the yacht when she first moved to California. Waddell went on to sail in the Caribbean aboard her and produced a painting of her. For a time she was also named Barbara's Song. Eventually she was sold again, named Winkapew and sailed as an adventure charter yacht in the Pacific North-west.

=== Sassy (1972) ===
Sassy, owned by E. Russell “Dutch” Schmidt and the third C&C 61 sloop built, was first to finish and the overall winner of the 1977 Super Mac Race. This was the second Super Mac Race held and was the inaugural year for the Chicago-Sarnia International Yacht Race from Chicago on Lake Michigan, through the Straits of Mackinac, and then south on Lake Huron to Sarnia, Ontario. Sassy finished in just over 74 hours elapsed time (just over 69 hours corrected time). Sassy crossed the finish line almost 8 1/2 hours ahead of the second boat in the fleet of 55.

Sassy was later sold to Mike Keeler of Grand Rapids, who renamed her Brassy and continued to race her through the 1980s. Keeler took the boat's name from his former company, Keeler Brass.

=== Joli (1974) ===
Joli, the fourth C&C 61 sloop launched, was originally owned by William F. Niemi, a partner with Eddie Bauer (the man) and president of Eddie Bauer (the company) in Washington State. After a number of years racing and cruising on the west coast, Niemi sold the boat to skier Mike Lund. In 1978, Niemi unexpectedly ended up with Joli once again when she was impounded for drug smuggling. Lund disappeared and on a side note, was arrested in 2001 after his identity was revealed through finger-printing when he was jailed for child-support charges.

=== Helisara (1974) ===
Helisara was built for Herbert von Karajan of Salzburg, Austria, and sailed and raced for years out of Saint-Tropez in the major Mediterranean events. The name of the boat is an acronym of (H)erbert, (El)iette, (Is)abel and (Ara)bel, the names of his third wife, French model Eliette Mouret [de] and their two daughters, Isabel and Arabel. She was later sold, renamed Koh I Noor and sailed throughout North America and the Caribbean since 1983.

=== Grampus (1975) ===
Grampus was completed in 1975 for the Pirelli family in Italy. By 2001 she was still being race successfully, taking class honors in the big boats in the 2001 Giraglia Rolex Cup, at which time the owner was Italian entrepreneur Carlo Alessandro Puri Negri, an heir of the Pirelli family.

== Cuthbertson archive ==
The Marine Museum of the Great Lakes in Kingston, Ontario has in its archives the early original C&C design and construction drawings, a retirement donation by George Cuthbertson of his papers. Drawings specific to the C&C 61 series in the collection include:

- 68-7 C&C 61 General
- 71-8 Robon
- 72-3 Ketch
- 72-4 Sassy
- 73-2 Joli
- 73-4 Helisara
- 74-25 Grampus
- 79-13 Brita
- 80-5 Pegasus

== Christopher Pratt paintings ==
The C&C 61 has been the subject of two different works by Newfoundland artist Christopher Pratt. Over the years Pratt owned five C&C yachts. The first was a Bluejacket 23, built in Nova Scotia, and later Dry Fly was his prized C&C 43:

=== Big Boat ===
One, titled Big Boat, is an oil on canvas portrait (dimensions 125 cm (49 in) x 293 cm (115 in)) of a C&C 61 partially exposed in the building hall. It was completed in 1987 and is in the permanent collection of the Art Gallery of Nova Scotia.

In his book The Prints of Christopher Pratt 1958 - 1991, Pratt writes:

Big Boat, shows the very animate, energetic profile of a C&C 61, glimpsed—with just a whiff of lechery—through a partially open warehouse door.

=== My Sixty-one ===
The second, titled My Sixty-one, is a colour serigraph on Rising Museum board (dimensions 57 cm (22 in) x 101.7 cm (40.0 in); image: 41 cm (16 in) x 91.5 cm (36.0 in), and was printed in a series of 65 examples in 1988. One copy is in the collection of the National Gallery of Canada.

Pratt writes,

From that Spring day in 1972 when I first sniffed the resin inside Erich Bruckmann's custom shop at C&C, I dreamed of owning a Custom ’61. It was a day-dream, and a persistent night-time dream as well; in that dream we were always getting ready to put to sea; to slip our lines and be off into the pre-dawn hours of a grey Atlantic day.

However, Pratt did not buy a Custom 61, stating that it "remains a dream of glory."

== See also ==
- List of sailing boat types
