= MV Hiawatha =

Canadian passenger ferry

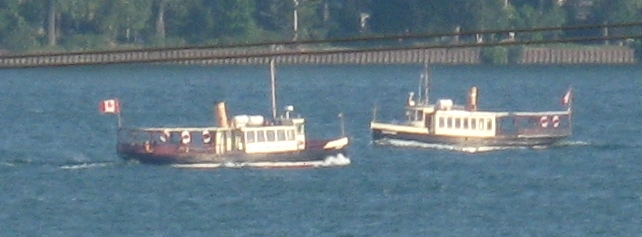
- Hiawatha (on right) about to pass her slightly younger berth-mate Kwasind (on left) in 2012

History
- Name: Hiawatha
- Owner: Royal Canadian Yacht Club
- Port of registry: (Canada) Toronto, Ontario
- Builder: Bertram Engine Works, Toronto
- Completed: 1895
- Status: in active service

General characteristics
- Type: Ferry
- Tonnage: 46 GT
- Length: 56 feet (17 m)
- Beam: 13.3 feet (4.1 m)
- Depth: 6.3 feet (1.9 m)
- Propulsion: Steam engine (prior to 1944); gasoline engine (since 1944)
- Capacity: 100 passengers

MV Hiawatha is a passenger ferry built in 1895 for the Royal Canadian Yacht Club, in Toronto, Ontario, Canada. The boat is 56 feet (17 m) long, 13.3 feet (4.1 m) wide, has a depth of 6.3 feet (1.9 m), and measures 46 gross tons. Her capacity is 100 passengers.

Hiawatha was built by the Bertram Engine Works near Queen's Wharf in Toronto harbour and named for Hiawatha, a First Nations leader and co-founder of the Iroquois confederacy. It is claimed to be the oldest passenger vessel still in active service on the North American Great Lakes. Hiawatha has served as a ferry for the yacht club since 1895. The boat was converted from a steam engine to a gasoline engine in 1944. The ship was refurbished in 1983.

On July 26, 2000, both Hiawatha and the yacht club's slightly newer ferry, Kwasind, were sunk by vandals. Kwasind was refloated and was back in working order the day of the sinking, while Hiawatha required further repair.
