= Super Mac Race =

The Super Mac Race is a non-periodic 568-mile (about 500 nautical miles) sail boat race from Chicago, Illinois to Port Huron, Michigan, or vice versa. Recent editions have been jointly sponsored by the Chicago Yacht Club, Bayview Yacht Club and Port Huron Yacht Club. The 2015 race was promoted as "The Longest Fresh Water Race on Earth," a debatable claim.

The race was originally known as the "Centennial Race" in 1975, then the "Chicago-Sarnia International Yacht Race" for several years, and then the "Millennium 600" before it was officially called the Super Mac. Although there are "Super Mack" references in newspapers dating back to 1978, the race wasn't officially known as the Super Mac until the 2009 & 2015 editions. Start & finish locations, courses and lengths, and sponsoring yacht clubs have varied over the 40-year history.

== History ==
As of 2018, there have been 11 Super Mac sail races of roughly 500 nautical miles, with the first in July 1975.

The Super Mac races have always followed immediately after the annual Chicago Race to Mackinac or the annual Bayview Mackinac Race. In Super Mac years:

- boats participating in the Chicago Mac Race continued directly on to Port Huron, MI or Sarnia, ONT without stopping at the Chicago Race to Mackinac Island finish line, or
- boats participating in the Bayview Mac continued on to Chicago, IL without stopping at the Bayview Mackinac Race Island finish line.

Since 1939, the Chicago and Bayview Mackinac races have been scheduled one week apart, with the Chicago race first in odd-numbered years and the Bayview race first in even-numbered years. In Super Mac years, this schedule allows competitors entered in both Mackinac races to continue between the two events and complete all three races.

== 1975: The 1st Race - Centennial Race - Port Huron, MI to Chicago, IL ==
The first race was known as the Centennial Race, commemorating the 100th anniversary of the Chicago Yacht Club. It was the longest race at 632 miles due to rounding Cove Island, and it began in Port Huron, MI on Saturday, July 19, 1975, finishing in Chicago. All participants first competed in the annual Bayview Mackinac Race, and after crossing the Mackinac finish line continued on directly to Chicago. The race turned into a long wait on Wednesday night with only 8 of the starting field of 160 yachts finishing before dark. Boats that stayed near the middle of Lake Michigan had much faster times than those that favored the Wisconsin shore.

Chuck Kirsch's Scaramouche, a Frers 54 from Chicago Yacht Club, was the overall winner on corrected time. Lynn Williams’ Dora IV, a Sparkman & Stephens 61 footer, was the first to finish in 104.006 hours. Dora IV was followed across the finish line by Frank Zurn's Kahili II, W. Bernard Herman's Bonaventure V, G. Craig Welch's Ranger, Scaramouche, Phil Watson's Namis, Joe Wright's Siren Song and Don Wildman's Heritage.

== 1977 through 1989: The 2nd through 7th Races - "Sarnia Race" - Chicago, IL to Sarnia, ONT ==
=== 1977 ===
The second race was the inaugural year for the Chicago-Sarnia International Yacht Race from Chicago on Lake Michigan, through the Straits of Mackinac, and then south on Lake Huron to Sarnia, ONT. Sponsored by the Sarnia Yacht Club, the Bayview Yacht Club and the Chicago Yacht Club, the 572-mile race started on Saturday, July 16, 1977, concurrently with the annual Chicago Race to Mackinac.

E. Russell "Dutch" Schmidt's Sassy, a custom C&C 61 from Bayview Yacht Club, was first to finish and the overall winner in just over 74 hours elapsed time (just over 69 hours corrected time). Sassy crossed the finish line almost 8½ hours ahead of the second boat in the fleet of 55. Other early finishers were Don Wildman's Heritage, Justin Goldman's Sliv, Robert Beck's Pirana, Encounter, and J.L. Shostak's Fujimo. In Section 2 first place went to Nils Muench's Moonraker, and in section 3 first place went to the NYYC Syndicate's Agnes.

=== 1981 ===
The third race began on Saturday, July 18, 1981, with boats struggling in light air from Chicago to Mackinac Island. About 60 boats entered the 1981 Sarnia Race.

Ted Reese's Cadence, a Peterson 34 from Michigan City Yacht Club, was the IOR and overall winner on corrected time. Cadence finished some 8 to 10 hours after the big boats, 10½ hours behind the first-to-finish, Don Wildman's Heritage, the 63-foot 12-Metre. Cadence's elapsed time of 93:24.54 corrected to 70:20:34, enough to overcome all the big boats – by 11 minutes and 27 seconds. Next best on corrected time were Dick Jenning's Real Crude, Nils Muench's Moonraker and Heritage (first to finish, averaging 11 mph for the 239 miles from Mackinac to Sarnia).

Wave Train, a Pearson 40, was the LMYA overall winner in 1981.

1981 was a controversial race due to an error in the sailing instructions that no one caught until the race was underway. The intention was to keep the fleet inside the easterly approach buoys at Mackinac Island by taking the SE buoy to starboard (staying in the shipping channel). But the sailing instructions flagged the NE buoy instead, which sent the fleet between the northern approach and the beach in front of Mission Point, into shallower water. Some of the fleet missed the typo, some assumed the sailing instructions were in error, and some tacked north to round the NE buoy. Following a protest, the race committee surveyed all participants asking which way they rounded the buoy and asked for an estimate from each boat regarding how much extra time they would have (or did) take to round the NE buoy. Finish times were then adjusted for each boat, but the controversy wasn't fully resolved until the Fall of 1981.

Sailors on Cheap Shot, a Heritage One-Ton, noted winds as high as 70 knots near the Manitous & Sleeping Bear. High winds began in the evening and persisted for 7 hours, with long train waves over 20 feet. High winds followed many hours of extreme calm & fog punctuated by the fog horn from the nearby cutter, Mackinaw. The straight line high winds from the north force several yachts to opt out. There was at least one boat dismasted and another with a lost rudder.

=== 1983 ===
The fourth race began on Saturday, July 16, 1983, and was won overall by Don Wildman's Heritage, a Charles Morgan 63’ 12-Metre from Chicago Yacht Club. Another published reference to the race as a "Super Mac" was found in the Detroit Free Press in that year, though still unofficial.

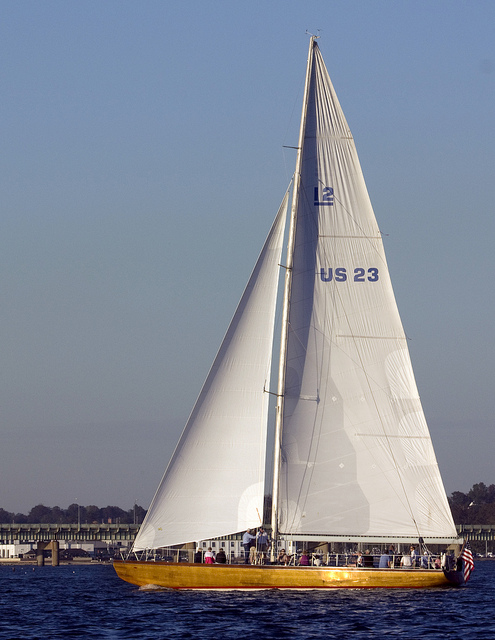
Heritage - 63' Charles Morgan 12-Metre

Heritage had already won the preceding 76th Race to Mackinac but they were not around to celebrate because they were among more than 50 of 287 boats that continued on to Sarnia.

Heritage also went on to win the 59th Port Huron-Mackinac race the following week, sweeping all three Mac races in 1983. As of 2015, no other boat & owner/crew has replicated the three Mac race sweep.

=== 1985 ===
The fifth race began on Saturday, July 13, 1985, was won by Hector J. Marchand's Dazzler, a J/41 (hull #1) from Michigan City Yacht Club. Dazzler battled Allegiance, the Alan Andrews designed One-tonner the entire 500 nautical miles, with the last gybe to the finish line deciding the winner. There were 41 boats entered in the 1985 ‘Sarnia Race.’

=== 1987 ===
The sixth race began on Saturday, July 18, 1987, and there were two winners. In IOR, the winner overall was Terry Reagan's Moody Blue, a Van Dam/Nelson-Marek 36 from Muskegon Yacht Club. And in IMS, the winner overall was Tom Giesler's Double Digits, a J/35 from South Haven Yacht Club.

Both winners were also awarded the "Sheldon Clark-Aaron DeRoy Intercity Mackinac Trophy." The large cast bronze plaque, first awarded in 1927, was donated as the award for "the best corrected time per mile in the Chicago to Mackinac and Detroit to Mackinac Races." It was awarded instead to the "Super Mac" winner in 1987, and again in 2000 and 2015.

John Nedeau's Windancer of Muskegon was first to finish in 66:50:34.

=== 1989 ===
The seventh race began on Saturday, July 15, 1989, but there were no finishers. That year, the Chicago Race to Mackinac was a ‘drifter’ with boats spending more time bobbing in light air than racing. The Race to Mackinac race was so slow many crews ran out of food and had to dip into Lake Michigan for drinking water, many simply dropped out well before reaching Mackinac Island.

== 2000: The 8th Race - Millennium 600 - Port Huron, MI to Chicago, IL ==
To celebrate the year 2000, and the 125th anniversary of the Chicago Yacht Club, the longer race was added once again to the Bayview Mackinac Race with competitors crossing the finish line at Mackinac Island and continuing on to Chicago to complete the Millennium 600. Though still not officially known as such, the informal "Super Mac" reference appeared in yacht club and newspaper pieces in 2000.

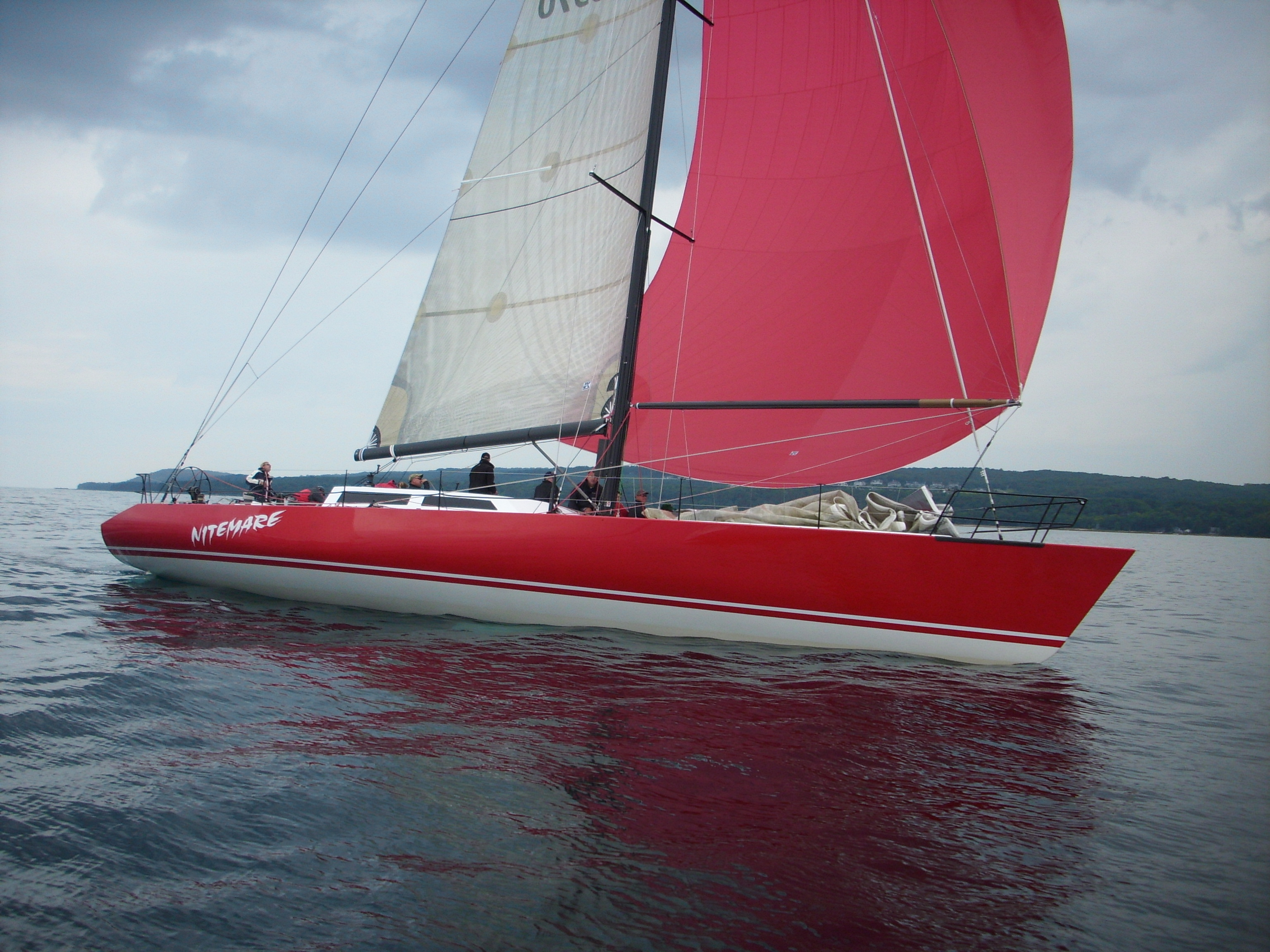
Nitemare

The eighth race began on Saturday, July 15, 2000, and once again there were two winners. In IMS, the overall winner was Tom Neill's Nitemare, a Great Lakes 70 from Chicago Yacht Club. In PHRF, the overall winner was Rich Stearns & Lynn A. Williams Jr.’s Glider, a Cal 40 from Chicago Yacht Club. Both were also awarded the Clark-DeRoy Trophy.

It was a fast race in 2000, and a new elapsed time record was set by Doug Baker's Magnitude, an Andrews 70 from Long Beach, CA. After a medium breeze in the Port Huron to Mackinac Island leg, a front came through sending the big boats roaring down the length of Lake Michigan to Chicago. Magnitude finished Tue at 3:25:02 am with an elapsed time of 61:25:02 – still the fastest Super Mac passage in either direction. Second to Magnitude were Peter Thornton's Holua, Nitemare, Dick Jenning's Pied Piper, Bill Martin's Stripes, Bob Saielle's Mongoose from San Diego, Mike Brotz’ Chance and John Nedeau's Windancer VI.

== 2009 through 2017: The 9th through 11th Races – Super Mac - Chicago, IL to Port Huron, MI ==
=== 2009 ===
The ninth race began on Saturday, July 18, 2009, and was won by Philip D. O’Neill III's Natalie J, a Nelson-Marek 46 from Bayview Yacht Club, over 3 hours ahead of the next finisher on corrected time. The first boat to finish was Fred Ball's Lucretia, a Newick designed 50-foot trimaran, with Natalie J second on elapsed time, followed by Ron White's trimaran Cheekee Monkey, Jay Gillespie's Fine Line and Bruce Geffen's catamaran Nice Pair.

Fred Ball's Lucretia, a 50’ Newick trimaran won the 3 boat multihull section.

=== 2015 ===
The tenth race began on Saturday, July 11, 2015, commemorating the 100th anniversary of the Bayview Yacht Club, and was won by Michael Leland's Hope, a Najad 332 from Michigan City Yacht Club – the smallest boat in the fleet of 31! The wind was moderate to light for the first several days. The smaller boats started first in the Chicago Mac, but as usual the big boats were well ahead before Mackinac Island. However, the wind was such that the larger boats had to beat their way to the Super Mac finish at Port Huron, MI while the smaller boats got to run in 30 knots of breeze, so it became their race. Hope was also awarded the Clark-DeRoy Trophy.

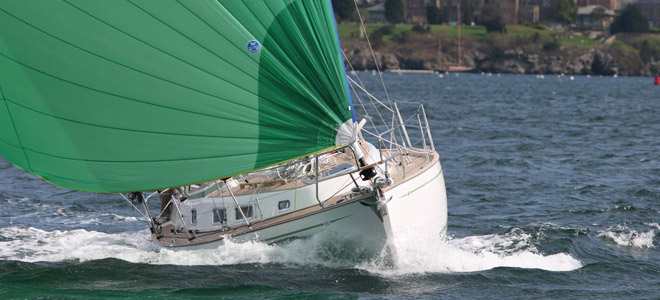
Hope d

Jonathan Alvord's Triceratops, a Corsair F-31R AC won the 4 boat multihull section.

The first boat to finish was Peter & Christopher Thornton's il Mostro, a Volvo 70 (former Puma) with an elapsed time of 64:56:35, believed to be the fastest passage from Chicago to Port Huron. Il Mostro was followed by Rick Warner's trimaran Areté, Bill Alcott / Tom Anderson's STP65 Equation, Philip D. O’Neill III's TP52 Natalie J and Dale Smirl's JV/66 Defiance.

=== 2017 ===
The eleventh race began on July 15, 2017. There were only 7 entries, and only 2 finishers, one monohull and one multihull. Rick Warner's Areté, an Orma 60 trimaran from PHYC & EYC finished the race in an elapsed time of 49:11:15. Mark Hagan's Relentless, a Schock 40 from GTYC finished in 95:46:25. The first night of the race, also the CYC Race to Mackinac, was hit with violent storms that continued well into Sunday. This was followed with very light winds. In the end almost one-third of the Race to Mackinac fleet, including 5 Super Mac entrants, retired due to storm damage, crew injury or subsequently the very light air.

== "The longest freshwater race on earth?" ==
The 289 nautical mile Chicago Race to Mackinac and the 300 nautical mile Lake Ontario 300 ‘Main Duck Course’ both claim the title of longest annual freshwater race. However, the first Chicago Race to Mackinac was held in 1898, so it is the oldest annual freshwater distance in the world, the 2017 edition was the 109th running of the race.

As for the Super Mac Race as "longest," the Lake Ontario Offshore Racing (LO 600) and the Great Lakes Single-handed Society (Super Mac & Back) are longer.

== Other References ==
[a] Dec 2015 Multiple contributors "Chicago<>Port Huron Super Mac History?" sailinganarchy.com thread

[b] Dec 2015 Multiple contributors "Who Won the 1985 Chicago-Sarnia Race???" sailinganarchy.com thread

[c] Dec 2015 Multiple contributors "Completed Evolution of the Super Mac - now pictures of winning boats?" sailinganarchy.com thread
