= James Henry Plummer =

Canadian financier

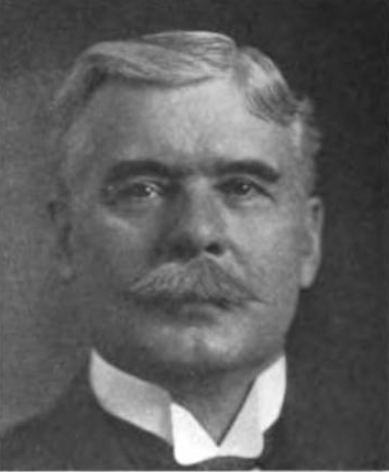
- Born: 19 February 1848; Mary Tavy, England
- Died: 10 September 1932 (aged 84); Toronto, Ontario
- Resting place: St. James Cemetery
- Occupation: Financier

James Henry Plummer (19 February 1848 – 10 September 1932) was a Canadian financier, He acquired the Dominion Iron and Steel Company in 1903 and developed it as a major industry before and during the First World War.

== Biography ==
Plummer was born in 1848 at Mary Tavy, England. He emigrated to British North America with his parents (William Plummer and Elizabeth Williams) in 1859 and was educated at Upper Canada College. In 1867 he began work as a clerk in the Toronto branch of the Bank of Montreal. He joined the Canadian Bank of Commerce in 1868 as a clerk, rising to become manager of several branches by 1878 and assistant general manager by 1903.

He was the namesake of the canal-sized package freighter J. H. Plummer, built in 1903 by Armstrong Whitworth & Company Ltd. at Newcastle-on-Tyne. This 257-foot, 1,643-ton steamer was owned originally by the Canadian Lake and ocean Navigation Company Ltd., a subsidiary of the McKenzie and Mann Group.

In 1903 Plummer acquired control of the Dominion Iron and Steel Company Ltd. (DISCO) from James Ross of Montreal, who in turn had purchased it from the Henry Melville Whitney syndicate of Boston, Massachusetts, in 1901. Plummer was elected president of DISCO in 1904. He acquired control of the Dominion Coal Company Ltd.(DOMCO) from Ross in 1910 and made both companies subsidiaries of the Dominion Steel Corporation (DOSCO).

In 1919 Plummer negotiated the sale of DOMCO and DISCO to a syndicate of British investors led by Roy M. Wolvin of Montreal. This led to the organization in 1921 of the British Empire Steel Company (BESCO), which was succeeded in 1930 by the Dominion Steel and Coal Corporation.

James H. Plummer lived in retirement in Toronto until his death there at the age of 84 on 10 September 1932.

Plummer is buried at St. James Cemetery.
