= Perry Connolly =

Canadian hotel constructor and yachtsman

Perry Connolly (June 24, 1927, Vancouver - September 29, 2017, Victoria, British Columbia) was a Canadian hotel constructor and yachtsman. Connolly was one of the instigators for George Cuthbertson to form C&C Yachts, whose Red Jacket won the 1968 SORC cup. In 1969 his boat Manitou won the Canada's Cup. Connolly was the director of operations for Canada II, an unsuccessful 1987 America's Cup challenger.

Connolly studied construction techniques at the Ryerson Institute of Technology (now Ryerson University). His P.R. Connolly Construction built hotels for Commonwealth Holiday Inn, building mostly in Ontario but also in Winnipeg. Connolly died of lung cancer.
