= Canada's Cup =

Canadian sailing trophy

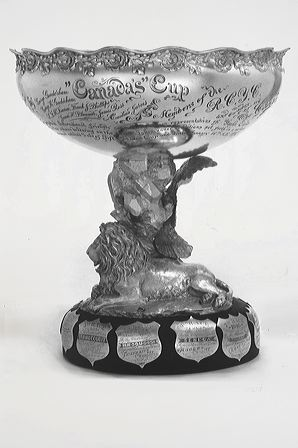
The Canada's Cup is a perpetual trophy awarded to the winner of a sailing match race between a yacht representing a Canadian yacht club and a yacht representing an American yacht club.

The Canada’s Cup is a silver trophy, deeded in perpetuity in 1896, to be awarded to the winner of a series of match races between a yacht representing a Canadian yacht club and one representing an American yacht club, both to be located on the Great Lakes.

The Cup matches were intended to be a test of the challenger’s and the defender’s abilities to design and build a yacht to the prevailing measurement rule, and to sail that yacht to victory. In a substantial departure from the original goal of the Cup to encourage racing yacht design, the 2001-2011 Cup challenge races were sailed in the Farr 40, and subsequently in the 2021 and 2022 Cup challenges in the Melges IC37: both one-design class yachts.

The Cup is approximately 30 cm (12 inches) high excluding base, specifically crafted for a cross-border sailing competition in 1896, and is an engraved bowl, gilt inside, whose richly embellished supporting pedestal depicts a lion (symbolising the British Empire of which Canada was a part at that time) and an eagle (symbolising the American Republic).

== Origin ==
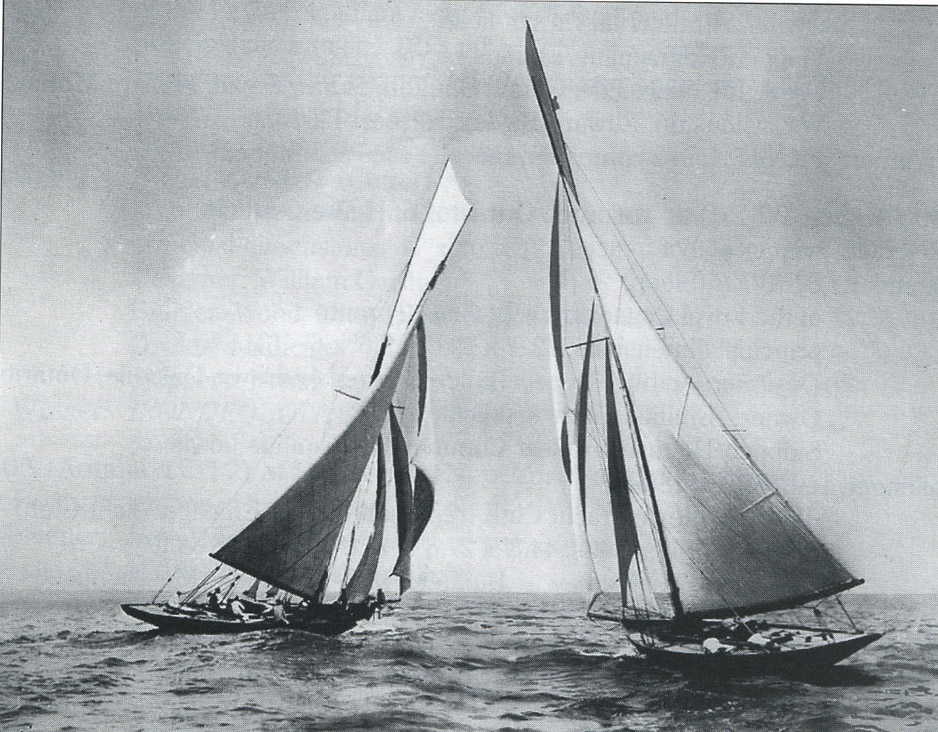
The yacht Canada (left) skippered by Aemilius Jarvis crosses tacks with Vencedor on Lake Erie near Toledo, Ohio, in the 1896 Canada's Cup match-racing series from which Canada emerged the victor.

In 1895, the Lincoln Park Yacht Club of Chicago challenged the Royal Canadian Yacht Club of Toronto (RCYC) to a series of races, to be held on “neutral” waters in the summer of 1896. As yacht racing was then a popular spectator sport, several cities competed to have the competition held in their waters; the winner was Toledo, Ohio, which put up a silver trophy made by Tiffany & Co. along with a cash prize of $1,500 (over $31,000 in 2012 purchasing power) – a customary practice in those days.

The American yacht, Vencedor, already in build at the time of the challenge, was a 63-foot cutter drawn by Thorwald S. Poekel, the former chief draughtsman at the renowned Herreshoff Manufacturing Company. The Canadian response was a 57-foot cutter designed by William Fife and named Canada. In the summer of 1896, both yachts sailed in company to Toledo, racing against other yachts along the way and building excitement along their respective voyages.

Canada won the first race in moderate weather. The following day brought high winds and rain; not wanting to expose a prized mainsail to high wind and rain, Vencedor's skipper asked for a lay day. Realizing how disadvantaged his vessel would be in heavy weather, Canada's skipper, Aemilius Jarvis, agreed to the postponement. The following day, the weather moderated and Canada took the series with two straight wins, collecting the cash and the trophy.

Jarvis and his syndicate then deeded the Cup to RCYC “as a perpetual challenge cup for friendly competition between representatives of yacht clubs of the two nations bordering on the Great Lakes.” Jarvis would sail for the Cup four more times, as defender and challenger before relinquishing the helm to another RCYC member.

== Conditions For Competition ==
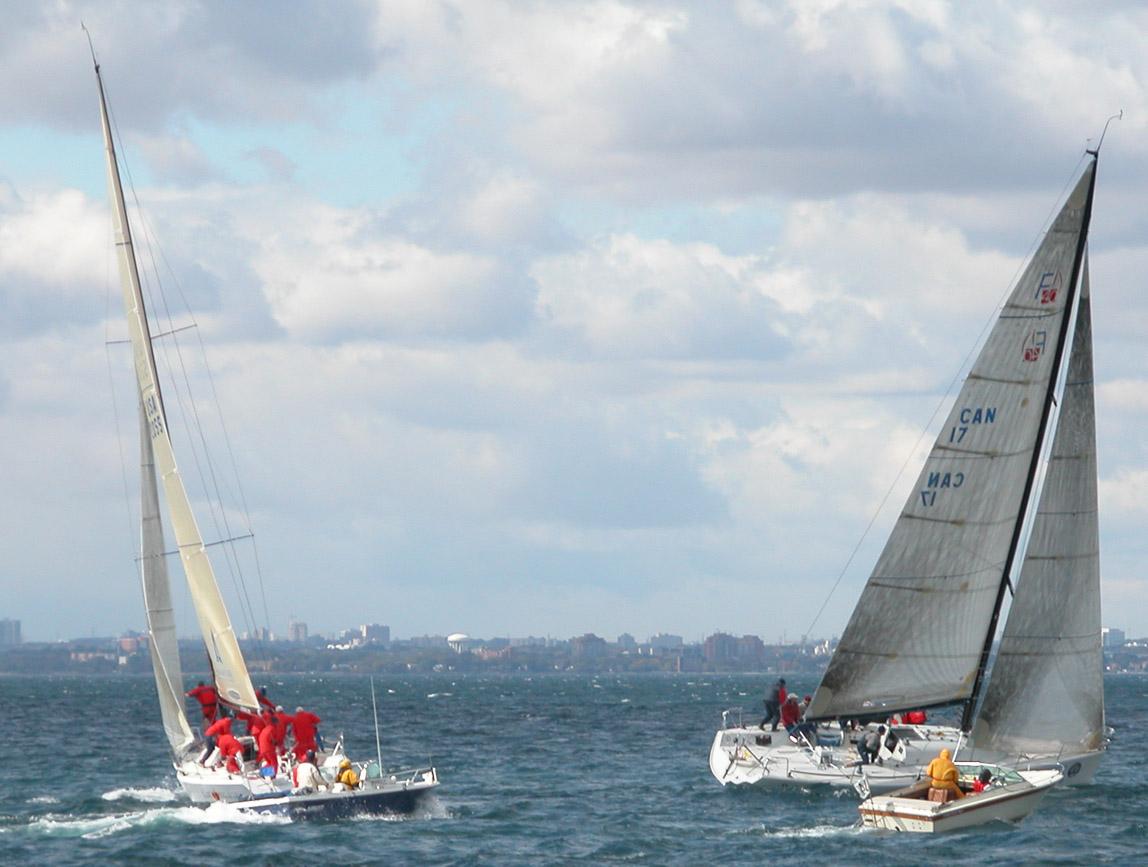
Defiant and Heartbreaker cross tacks in the 2003 Canada's Cup match, closely followed by umpire boats.

A challenge must be cross-border (a US club may not challenge a US club nor a Canadian club another Canadian club), but other than that restriction, any yacht club on the Great Lakes may issue a challenge to the current holder. Once the challenge has been accepted, the defending club must select a defender from within the club. The challenger, however, must open its selection to any yacht from its own side of the border. In some years, the result has been an intense round of races on both sides to select the boats for the final series.

In theory, choice of the type of yacht is the sole prerogative of the challenger; in practice, it is the subject of negotiation, not only to accord with the current appreciation of what constitutes an appropriate vessel for competition at this level, but to leaven the considerable expense with a design that would have a respectable service life after the contest. Accordingly, yachts have been designed to whatever leading-edge but acceptably stable rating rule was in force at the time. Canada and Vencedor were designed to the Seawanhaka rule. Subsequent vessels have been built to the Universal Rule, Girth Rule, The International Rule and Cruising Club of America Rule, then the International Offshore Rule and MORC.

== One Design vs Development Class ==
From 2001 until 2011, the Farr 40 one-design yacht was used. Choice of this design not only assured owners of having a useful boat at the end of the series, it had the effect of focussing the competition on crew and tactical skills.

For the 2016 challenge, the committee decided against one design yachts and reverted to the original approach of one off yachts built to a design standard/rule. The 8-Metre yacht an International Rule type class, used in the 1930, 1932, and 1934 challenges and last sailed in the 1954 Canada's Cup, was chosen. Three boats sailed for the right to challenge and three boats sailed to be chosen as defender for the 2016 Cup. The 2016 8-Metre World Championship held in Toronto three weeks before the 2016 Canada's Cup competition helped generate significant media interest for both events.

For the 2020 challenge the Canada’s Cup Committee selected the Melges IC37, a strict one-design class, for the 2020, 2022 and 2024 Canada's Cup events. The 2020 Canada's Cup event was cancelled due to the Covid 19 epidemic and deferred to 2021 when it was held at the Royal Canadian Yacht Club.

== Competitors ==
Year	Victor	Club	Owner/Skipper	Defeated	Club	Owner/Skipper	Venue
1896	Canada	Royal Canadian Yacht Club	Owner/Aemilius Jarvis Joseph FlavelleJames Henry PlummerSyndicate Skipper/Aemilius Jarvis	Vencedor	Lincoln Park Yacht Club*	Owner/Commodore Charles E. Berriman Skipper/Captain J. G. Barbour	Toledo
1899	Genesee	Chicago Yacht Club	Owner/Charles Van Voorhis Syndicate Skipper/C. G. Davis	Beaver	Royal Canadian Yacht Club	Aemilius Jarvis	Chicago
1901	Invader	Royal Canadian Yacht Club	Aemilius Jarvis	Cadillac of Detroit	Chicago Yacht Club	Owner/Commodore Shaw Detroit Yacht Club Skipper/W. M. Hale Thompson	Chicago
1903	Irondequoit	Rochester Yacht Club	Owner/Hiram W. Sibley, James Sibley Watson Syndicate Skippers/James Barr & Addison G. Hanan	Strathcona	Royal Canadian Yacht Club	Owner/Norman Macrae Skipper/Aemilius Jarvis	Toronto
1905	Iroquois	Rochester Yacht Club	Owner/Vice-Commodore Frank T. Christie Syndicate Skipper/Laurie G. Mabbett	Temeraire	Royal Canadian Yacht Club	Owner/Rear Commodore Frederic Nicholls Skipper/E. K. M. Wedd	Rochester
1907	Seneca	Rochester Yacht Club	Owner/Syndicate Skipper Addison G. Hanan	Adele	Royal Canadian Yacht Club	Owner/Cawthra Mulock Skipper/Aemilius Jarvis	Rochester
1930	Thisbe	Rochester Yacht Club	W. P. Barrows	Quest	Royal Canadian Yacht Club	Owner/George Horace Gooderham Syndicate Skipper/Norman R. Gooderham	Rochester
1932	Conewago	Rochester Yacht Club	Owners/Wilmot V. Castle and Albert B. Eastwood Skipper/Wilmot V. "Rooney" Castle	Invader II	Royal Canadian Yacht Club	Owner/Syndicate Skipper/Walter Windeyer Jr.	Rochester
1934	Conewago	Rochester Yacht Club	Wilmot V. Castle	Invader II	Royal Canadian Yacht Club	Owner/Commodore George Horace Gooderham Skipper/Thomas K. Wade	Rochester
1954	Venture II	Royal Canadian Yacht Club	Owner/Norman Walsh Skipper/David Howard	Iskareen	Rochester Yacht Club	Owner/Herbert Wahl Skipper/Howard Klitgard	Rochester
1969	Manitou	Royal Canadian Yacht Club	Owners/Perry Connolly, Gordon Fisher, Gordon Osler Skipper/Gordon Fisher	Niagara	Cleveland Yachting Club	John Lovett	Toronto
1972	Dynamite	Bayview Yacht Club	E. Lloyd Ecclestone Jr.	Mirage	Royal Canadian Yacht Club	Owner/Gordon Fisher Syndicate Skipper/Gordon Fisher	Toronto
1975	Golden Dazy	Bayview Yacht Club	Owner/Dr. Gerry Murphy Skipper/Don Criner	Marauder	Royal Canadian Yacht Club	Owner/Gordon Fisher Syndicate Skipper/David Howard	Detroit
1978	Evergreen	Royal Hamilton Yacht Club	Owner/Skipper Don Green	Agape	Bayview Yacht Club	Terry Kohler	Detroit
1981	Coug	Royal Hamilton Yacht Club	Owner/Skipper Tony Ronza	Black Magic	Bayview Yacht Club	Skipper/Mike "Grizz" Thompson	Hamilton
1984	Coug II	Royal Canadian Yacht Club	Owner/Skipper Tony Ronza	Stars and Stripes	Bayview Yacht Club	Bill Martin	Toronto
1988	Challenge 88	Bayview Yacht Club	John Uznis	Steadfast	Royal Canadian Yacht Club	Owner/Skipper Fred Sherratt	Toronto
1994	Champion Eagle	Bayview Yacht Club	Wally Cross	Absolute	Royal Canadian Yacht Club	Owner/Brian Rikley Skipper/Hans Fogh	Detroit
2001	Defiant	Royal Canadian Yacht Club	Owner/Paul James Phelan Skipper/Terry McLaughlin	Saturn	Bayview Yacht Club	Robert Hughes	Detroit
2003	Defiant	Royal Canadian Yacht Club	Owner/Paul James Phelan Skipper/Terry McLaughlin	Heartbreaker	Macatawa Bay Yacht Club	Robert Hughes	Toronto
2007	Heartbreaker	Macatawa Bay Yacht Club	Robert Hughes	Honour	Royal Canadian Yacht Club	Alec Krstajic	Toronto.
2010	Convexity	Chicago Match Race Center	Don Wilson	Vincere	Port Credit Yacht Club	Owner/Grant Hood Skipper/Oskar Johansson	Chicago
2011	Vincere	Royal Canadian Yacht Club	Owner/Grant Hood Skipper/Oskar Johansson	Heritage	Macatawa Bay Yacht Club	Robert Hughes	Macatawa Bay
2016	Hollandia	Royal Canadian Yacht Club	Owner/Tim van Rootselaar Skipper/Bryan Gooderham	Yquem	Youngstown Yacht Club	Adam Burns	Toronto
2021	Defiant	Royal Canadian Yacht Club	Owner/Paul L'Heureux Skipper/Terry McLaughlin	Zing	Youngstown Yacht Club	Commodore Adam Burns	Toronto
2022	Defiant	Royal Canadian Yacht Club	Owner/Paul L'Heureux Skipper/Terry McLaughlin	Zing	Youngstown Yacht Club	Commodore Adam Burns	Toronto

- Merged with Chicago Yacht Club, 1920
