= Redline 41 =

Sailboat class

Redline 41 Mark I
Development
- Designer: Cuthbertson & Cassian
- Location: Canada
- Year: 1967
- No. built: 2
- Builder: Bruckmann Manufacturing
- Name: Redline 41 Mark I

Boat
- Displacement: 19,475 lb (8,834 kg)
- Draft: 6.30 ft (1.92 m)

Hull
- Type: Monohull
- Construction: Fiberglass
- LOA: 41.42 ft (12.62 m)
- LWL: 30.00 ft (9.14 m)
- Beam: 11.17 ft (3.40 m)

Hull appendages
- Keel: fin keel
- Ballast: 9,500 lb (4,309 kg)
- Rudder: internally-mounted spade-type rudder

Rig
- General: Masthead sloop
- I foretriangle height: 50.00 ft (15.24 m)
- J foretriangle base: 16.00 ft (4.88 m)
- P mainsail luff: 43.50 ft (13.26 m)
- E mainsail foot: 17.30 ft (5.27 m)

Sails
- Mainsail area: 376.28 sq ft (34.958 m^{2})
- Jib/genoa area: 400.00 sq ft (37.161 m^{2})
- Total sail area: 776.28 sq ft (72.119 m^{2})

The Redline 41 is a series of sailboat designs, first built in 1967 and that remained in production in 2017. The first two designs were by Cuthbertson & Cassian and the more recent one by Mark Mills.

The three different boats that have carried the Redline 41 name are all unrelated designs.

== Design and development ==
All the Redline 41 designs are small recreational keelboats, built predominantly of fiberglass and other composites. The earlier two designs were predominately built as cruising sailboats, whereas the most recent boat was conceived as a racer that can also be used for cruising.

The original Redline 41, later called the Mark I, was designed by Cuthbertson & Cassian and produced by Bruckmann Manufacturing, although only two were built between 1967 and the following year.

The second model, known as the Redline 41 Mark II, was also designed by Cuthbertson & Cassian and produced by Bruckmann Manufacturing starting in 1969, which became part of C&C Yachts that same year. This version was similar to the earlier version, but used new molds and 35 examples were built. The boat remained in production until 1972, when sales declined and it was discontinued. Lindsay Plastics purchased the molds and produced the Newport 41 from them under the name of Capital Yachts.

The Redline 41 name was resurrected in 2014 with a new design by Mark Mills based on his 2001 design, the King 40. It was produced by US Watercraft who bought the C&C Yachts' name, using it as a marketing brand, until the company went out of business in 2018.

== Operational history ==
One of the two Redline 41 Mark Is produced was named Condor and won the 1972 Southern Ocean Racing Conference (SORC) championships.

== Variants ==
Redline 41 Mark I
This model was introduced in 1967, designed by Cuthbertson & Cassian and produced by Bruckmann Manufacturing in Canada, which became part of C&C Yachts in 1969. Only two examples had been built when production ended in 1968. The design uses predominantly fibreglass construction, has a masthead sloop rig, an internally-mounted spade-type rudder and a fixed fin keel. It has a length overall of 41.42 ft (12.6 m), a waterline length of 30.00 ft (9.1 m), displaces 19,475 lb (8,834 kg) and carries 9,500 lb (4,309 kg) of lead ballast. The boat has a draft of 6.30 ft (1.92 m) with the standard keel fitted. The boat has a hull speed of 7.34 kn (13.59 km/h).

Redline 41 Mark II
This model was introduced in 1969 and production continued until 1972, with 35 examples constructed. It was also designed by Cuthbertson & Cassian and produced by Bruckmann Manufacturing in Canada, which was then part of C&C Yachts. The design uses predominantly fibreglass construction, has a masthead sloop rig, an internally-mounted spade-type rudder and a fixed fin keel. It has a length overall of 41.42 ft (12.6 m), a waterline length of 30.00 ft (9.1 m), displaces 19,700 lb (8,936 kg) and carries 9,500 lb (4,309 kg) of lead ballast. The boat has a draft of 6.75 ft (2.06 m) with the standard keel fitted. The boat is fitted with a Universal Atomic 4 gasoline engine of 30 hp (22 kW). The boat has a PHRF racing average handicap of 108 with a high of 99 and low of 114. It has a hull speed of 7.34 kn (13.59 km/h).

C&C Yachts Redline 41
This model was introduced in 2014 and remained in production until the company went out of business in 2018. It was designed by Mark Mills and is produced by US Watercraft under the C&C Yachts brand, in Warren, Rhode Island, United States. The design uses E-glass and foam sandwich infusion construction. The mast is carbon fibre. It has a fractional sloop rig, an internally-mounted spade-type rudder and a fixed cast iron fin keel with a lead bulb weight. It has a length overall of 40.70 ft (12.4 m), a waterline length of 35.40 ft (10.8 m), displaces 15,100 lb (6,849 kg) and carries 7,232 lb (3,280 kg) of lead ballast. The boat has a draft of 8.20 ft (2.50 m) with the standard keel fitted. The boat is fitted with a Volvo diesel engine of 40 hp (30 kW). The fuel tank holds 39 U.S. gallons (150 L; 32 imp gal) and the fresh water tank has a capacity of 70 U.S. gallons (260 L; 58 imp gal).

== See also ==
- List of sailing boat types
