= Canadian Yachting =

Bi-monthly magazine

- Canadian Yachting, June 2020
- Managing Editor: Andy Adams
- Online Editor: John Morris
- Travel Editor: Elizabeth Kerr
- Categories: Sport, Leisure, Travel
- Frequency: Bi-monthly
- Format: 8' x 10 3/4"
- Publisher: Greg Nicoll
- Total circulation (2012): 30,000
- Founded: 1976
- Company: Adastra Media Inc. in association with Kerrwil Publications Limited
- Country: Canada
- Based in: Midland, Ontario
- Language: English
- Website: www.canadianyachting.ca
- ISSN: 0384-0999
- OCLC: 423622220

Canadian Yachting is a bi-monthly (six issues a year) magazine, and boating news website which documents the Canadian yachting scene - from dinghies to keelboats, cruising to racing, youth sailing and around the world events. Canadian Yachting is published in Midland, Ontario by publisher Greg Nicoll, with Managing Editor Andy Adams, and has a paid circulation of 30,000. Canadian Yachting also produces related bi-Weekly e-newsletters in National, West and Atlantic editions, as well as a digital magazine edition. Canadian Yachting maintains a comprehensive web site, under the care of Online Editor John Morris, which first went online in November 2009.

Canadian Yachting is Canada’s only national boating lifestyle magazine which features local, regional, national and international destinations, power and sailboat reviews, as well as how to articles on safety, seamanship, electronics, navigation, DIY repairs and upgrades, and entertaining. The publication is known for its boat reviews, both of new and current models as well as those on the used boat market. Other key features include an extensive classifieds section and an "Ask the Experts" column. A subscription is included with a membership to Canadian Power and Sail Squadrons. Each issue of Canadian Yachting contain the Canadian Power and Sail Squadrons publication, The Port Hole.

== History ==
Canadian Yachting Cover, first issue, September 1976

Canadian Yachting was founded in September 1976 (Volume 1, Number 1) by publisher Gerald Gordon Kidd, under the editorship of Ron Joiner, assisted by John Turnbull, working out of the Vancouver, British Columbia offices of Pacific Yachting Magazine (also published by Gerald Kidd), although a Church Street, Toronto address was listed as their formal address, and later headquarters. The first issue included an extensive preview of "Dockside 76" that was to be held in September of that year at Ontario Place, under the title "Dockside Boat Show Section."

Gerald Kidd eventually sold his entire publishing company to MacLean Hunter in 1978. Canadian Yachting was published by Maclean-Hunter from December 1978 (V.3 no.12) up to 'Summer' 1990 (V.16 no.4, with an erroneous label suggesting V.17 [sic]).

Canadian Yachting was acquired By Kerrwil Publications Limited in 1990 after MacLean Hunter had decided to divest its special interest magazines, and, since September 1990 (V.16 no.5), has been published six times a year by Kerrwil Publications. With the acquisition came editor Doug Hunter, his colleague Iain MacMillan, along with Barry Redmayne and Carolyn Haltrect.

Canadian Yachting next publisher was Cam MacDonald, who was followed by Elizabeth Kerr, and now Greg Nicoll.

The publication launched the first consumer special interest website in 1998. Along with Boating Industry Canada, Canadian Yachting became the first consumer title in the boating magazines category worldwide to launch a digital version.

In 2012 Kerrwil set up a new company called Adastra Media Inc. to create a focus for the boating brands while Kerrwil reentered the electrical market in Canada. Adastra is a Latin phrase translated as “to the stars” and was chosen, in part, to honour Jack Kerr, the founder of Kerrwil, and his service in the Royal Canadian Air Force. Today the company is operating under the Canadian Yachting Media Brand.

Canadian Yachting is the foundation of Canadian Yachting Media. Within the group are Boating Industry Canada, Canadian Yachting onBOARD, the Toronto Boat Show Guide, Boating Ontario's Annual Directory, Boating Equipment News and the recently acquired Ports guides. In addition with Pacific Yachting as the sales arm, Canadian Yachting Media publishes the Vancouver Boat Show Guide as well. Canadian Yachting is a member of Magazines Canada, Boating Ontario, NMMA Canada and BC Boating.

=== Canadian Yachting West ===
Canadian Yachting West, a magazine edition catering more specifically to a west coast audience, launched with the January 2012 edition, still with a national view, but with a west coast perspective. The Canadian Yachting West edition was published up to at least the April 2016 edition.

== Awards ==
In its second year of publication a Canadian Yachting article titled "Tuning Racing Cats", written by Larry Woods, won a National Magazine Award for the Category: Science & Technology. In 1982 a Canadian Yachting article titled "The Cruelest Month", written by Larry Woods, won gold in the National Magazine Awards for the Category: Humour, and in that same year another Canadian Yachting article, "Yacht Design Plugs In", won honourable Mention for John Turnbull, in the Category: Science & Technology.
