= Sailing at the 1956 Summer Olympics – Dragon =

Sailing at the Olympics

Dragon at the Games of the XVI Olympiad
- Medallists
- Venue: Port Phillip
- Dates: 26–29 November and 3–5 December
- Competitors: 50 from 16 nations
- Teams: 16

Medalists
1st place, gold medalist(s)		Folke Bohlin; Bengt Palmquist; Leif Wikström	Sweden
2nd place, silver medalist(s)		Ole Berntsen; Cyril Andresen; Christian von Bülow	Denmark
3rd place, bronze medalist(s)		Graham Mann; Ronald Backus; Jonathan Janson	Great Britain

The Dragon was a sailing event in the sailing program of the 1956 Summer Olympics, held on Port Phillip. Seven races were scheduled. Fifty sailors, on 16 boats, from 16 nations competed.

== Results ==
Rank	Helmsman (Country)	Crew	Yachtname	Race I		Race II		Race III		Race IV		Race V		Race VI		Race VII		Total Points	Total -1
Rank	Helmsman (Country)	Crew	Yachtname	Rank	Points	Rank	Points	Rank	Points	Rank	Points	Rank	Points	Rank	Points	Rank	Points	Total Points	Total -1
1st place, gold medalist(s)	Folke Bohlin (SWE)	Bengt Palmquist; Leif Wikström	Slaghoken II.	8	402	2	1004	1	1305	8	402	~~9~~	~~351~~	1	1305	1	1305	6074	5723
2nd place, silver medalist(s)	Ole Berntsen (DEN)	Cyril Andresen; Christian von Bülow	Tip	1	1305	4	703	4	703	2	1004	2	1004	2	1004	~~6~~	~~527~~	6250	5723
3rd place, bronze medalist(s)	Graham Mann (GBR)	Ronald Backus; Jonathan Janson	Bluebottle	4	703	~~12~~	~~226~~	8	402	1	1305	6	527	5	606	2	1004	4773	4547
4	Jorge Salas Chávez (ARG)	Arnoldo Pekelharing; Boris Belada	Pampero	3	828	8	402	2	1004	7	460	~~DNF~~	~~0~~	3	828	4	703	4225	4225
5	Graham Horace Drane (AUS)	Brian Carolan; Jim Carolan	Paula	2	1004	10	305	~~14~~	~~159~~	4	703	4	703	4	703	9	351	3928	3769
6	Sergio Sorrentino (ITA)	Piero Gorgatto; Annibale Pelaschiar	Aretusa	~~DSQ~~	~~0~~	1	1305	3	828	DNF	0	7	460	9	351	7	460	3404	3404
7	Thor Thorvaldsen (NOR)	Carl Otto Svae; Bjørn Oscar Gulbrandsen	Pan II.	7	460	5	606	9	351	5	606	8	402	~~10~~	~~305~~	3	828	3558	3253
8	David Howard (CAN)	Cliff Howard; Donald Tytler	Tomahawk III.	6	527	7	460	~~10~~	~~305~~	11	264	3	828	7	460	5	606	3450	3186
9	Gene Walet III (USA)	Gene Walet Jr. Carlos Echeverria; Danny Killeen	Spirit III.	~~DNF~~	~~0~~	11	264	11	264	6	527	1	1305	6	527	11	264	3151	3151
10	Theodor Thomsen (EUA)	Erich Natusch; Georg Nowka	Gustl XL	5	606	6	527	5	606	9	351	5	606	~~DNF~~	~~0~~	12	226	2922	2922
11	Ivan Matveev (URS)	Andrei Mazovka; Pyotr Tolstikhin	Neptun II.	12	226	3	828	7	460	13	191	12	226	12	226	~~13~~	~~191~~	2348	2157
12	Robert Stewart (NZL)	Albert Wallace Cuthbertson; William Edgar Swinnerton	Red Dragon	9	351	~~DSQ~~	~~0~~	15	129	3	828	10	305	DSQ	0	8	402	2015	2015
13	Bernardo d'Almeida (POR)	Carlos Rogenmoser de Lourenco; Sérgio Marques	Canopus	~~13~~	~~191~~	9	351	6	527	12	226	13	191	8	402	10	305	2193	2002
14	John Flinkenberg (FIN)	Tor-Kristian Lindh; Joel Jahn	Xantippa	10	305	13	191	12	226	~~DNF~~	~~0~~	11	264	11	264	14	159	1409	1409
15	Brownlow Eve (BER)	Bernard Ward; Jimmy Kempe	Pam	11	264	15	129	~~16~~	~~101~~	10	305	14	159	13	191	16	101	1250	1149
16	Ned Holiday (SIN)	Kenneth Golding; Robert Ho; Keith Johnson	Rika II.	14	159	14	159	13	191	~~DNF~~	~~0~~	15	129	14	159	15	129	926	926

DNF = Did Not Finish, DNS= Did Not Start, DSQ = Disqualified
= Male, = Female

=== Daily standings ===
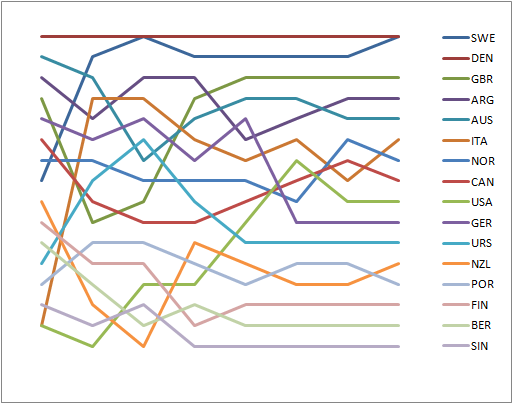
Graph showing the daily standings in the Dragon during the 1956 Summer Olympics

== Conditions on Port Phillip ==
Of the total of three race areas were needed during the Olympics in the Port Phillip Bay. Each of the classes was using the same scoring system. The center course was used for the Dragon.
