= Deaths in October 2001 =

The following is a list of notable deaths in October 2001.

Entries for each day are listed alphabetically by surname. A typical entry lists information in the following sequence:

- Name, age, country of citizenship at birth, subsequent country of citizenship (if applicable), reason for notability, cause of death (if known), and reference.

== October 2001 ==
=== 1 ===
- Guy Beaulne, 79, French-Canadian actor and theatre director.
- Lee Cronbach, 85, American educational psychologist.
- Surendranath Dwivedy, 88, Indian politician, journalist and social worker.
- Kenny Greene, 32, American singer-songwriter, AIDS.
- Gloria Hemingway, 69, American physician and daughter of Ernest Hemingway, hypertension and cardiovascular disease.
- Mickey Trotman, 26, Trinidad and Tobago football player, traffic collision.

=== 2 ===
- Manny Albam, 79, American jazz baritone saxophone player, composer, and producer.
- Franz Biebl, 95, German classical music composer.
- Jim Carolane, 73, Australian Olympic sailor (1956).
- Donald J. Cohen, 61, American psychiatrist and psychoanalyst, melanoma.
- Fernando Mendes, 55, Portuguese cyclist, traffic accident.

=== 3 ===
- Alfie Almario, 38, Filipino basketball player, heart attack.
- Pat Ast, 59, American actress and model.
- Ricky Belmonte, 54, Filipino actor, stroke.
- Kostas Chatzichristos, 80, Greek actor, cancer.
- Homer Elias, 46, American gridiron football player (Detroit Lions), heart attack.
- Alessandro Fersen, 89, Polish-Italian dramatist, actor, and theater director.
- Phillip Goldson, 78, Belizean newspaper editor, activist and politician.
- Tullio Pane, 71, Italian singer.
- Gregorio Peralta, 66, Argentine boxer.

=== 4 ===
- Blaise Alexander, 25, American race car driver, racing crash.
- Irmgard Farden Aluli, 89, Hawaiian composer.
- George Claydon, 68, British actor and mascot of the England Football Team in 1966.
- John Collins, 88, American jazz guitarist, cancer.
- Arthur Daniels, 79, Welsh rugby league player.
- Floyd Robert Gibson, 91, American judge.
- Al Ham, 76, American composer and jingle writer.
- Antonín Máša, 66, Czech film director and screenwriter.
- Ahron Soloveichik, 84, American torah scholar and rabbi.

=== 5 ===
- Peter Burge, 69, Australian cricketer.
- Jim Cain, 74, American gridiron football player (Chicago Cardinals, Detroit Lions).
- Clyde L. Choate, 81, American politician and decorated soldier.
- Brian Edgar, 65, British rugby league player.
- Woody Jensen, 94, American baseball player (Pittsburgh Pirates).
- Jan Lenica, 73, Polish graphic designer and cartoonist.
- Mike Mansfield, 98, American politician and diplomat (U.S. Representative from Montana, U.S. Senator from Montana, Senate Majority Leader).
- Egbert van 't Oever, 74, Dutch speed skater and Olympian (1952, 1956), colon cancer.
- Emilie Schindler, 93, German wife of Oskar Schindler who helped save the lives of 1,200 Jews during World War II.
- Ollie Shoaff, 77, American basketball player.
- Zoltán Székely, 97, Hungarian violinist and composer.

=== 6 ===
- Jacqueline Babbin, 75, American television and theatre writer and producer, cancer.
- Miguel del Toro, 29, Mexican baseball player (San Francisco Giants), traffic collision.
- Axel Düberg, 73, Swedish film actor.
- Arne Harris, 67, American television producer-director (WGN-TV broadcasts of Chicago Cubs).
- Yuriy Meshcheryakov, 55, Soviet and Ukrainian animator.
- Lenore Carrero Nesbitt, 69, American district judge (United States District Court for the Southern District of Florida).
- Milton A. Rothman, 81, American nuclear physicist, complications due to diabetes.

=== 7 ===
- Chris Adams, 46, English wrestler and judoka, brother of Olympic Judo star Neil Adams, shot.
- Gaby Basset, 99, French film actress.
- Roger Gaudry, 87, Canadian chemist, businessman, and university rector.
- Alf Gover, 93, English test cricketer.
- Herblock, 91, American editorial cartoonist (The Washington Post).
- Stewart Imlach, 69, Scottish football player.
- Jimmie Logsdon, 79, American country and rockabilly singer, songwriter and radio DJ.
- Reg Matthews, 68, English football player.
- Polly Rowles, 87, American actress (The Defenders, Sweet Liberty, Power).
- Kurt Svanberg, 88, Swedish Olympic ice hockey player (1948).
- Joann Lee Tiesler, 30, American murder victim.
- Caroline Verbraecken-De Loose, 76, Belgian Olympic gymnast (1948).

=== 8 ===
- Mongo Beti, 69, Cameroonian writer.
- Osman Coşgül, 73, Turkish Olympic long-distance runner (1952).
- Alfred Fyodorov, 66, Soviet football player and coach.
- Kenneth L. Hale, 67, American linguist.
- Caryl Parker Haskins, 93, American scientist, author, inventor, philanthropist, and entomologist.
- Seymour Heller, 87, American talent agent and manager (represented Liberace).
- Javed Iqbal, 45, Pakistani serial killer, intoxication.
- Dmitry Polyansky, 83, Soviet statesman.
- Sankaradi, 77, Indian actor.
- Angelo Varetto, 90, Italian cyclist.
- Nel Zwier, 65, Dutch high jumper and Olympian (1960).

=== 9 ===
- Roberto de Oliveira Campos, 84, Brazilian economist, writer, diplomat, and politician, heart attack.
- Dagmar, 79, American actress, model, and television personality.
- Vladimir Danilevich, 77, Soviet and Russian animator.
- Shirley Doty, 71, American politician.
- Norris Houghton, 91, American theatre manager and producer.
- Pietro Righetti, 102, Italian racing cyclist.
- Herbert Ross, 74, American film director (The Turning Point, Footloose) and choreographer (Anyone Can Whistle), heart failure.
- William A. Ryan, 82, American politician.
- Károly Simonyi, 84, Hungarian physicist and writer.
- Judita Čeřovská, 72, Czech pop and chanson singer.

=== 10 ===
- Begliomini, 86, Brazilian footballer.
- Eddie Futch, 90, American boxing trainer (Joe Frazier, Ken Norton, Larry Holmes, Trevor Berbick).
- Cal Gardner, 76, Canadian ice hockey player (New York Rangers, Toronto Maple Leafs, Chicago Black Hawks, Boston Bruins).
- Dave Gerard, 65, American baseball player (Chicago Cubs).
- Evgeni Kharadze, 93, Georgian astronomer, public figure and statesman.
- Vasily Mishin, 84, Soviet rocket designer.
- Luis Antonio García Navarro, 60, Spanish conductor (music director of the Teatro Real).
- Samuel Ndhlovu, 64, Zambian footballer and coach.
- Anna Amelia Obermeyer, 94, South African botanist.
- Chet Ostrowski, 71, American gridiron football player (Washington Redskins).
- Gabriele Wülker, 90, German social scientist and civil servant.

=== 11 ===
- Krzysztof Chamiec, 71, Polish actor, lung cancer.
- Franco Committeri, 77, Italian film producer.
- Nada Mamula, 74, Yugoslavian singer.
- Billy Maxted, 84, American jazz pianist.
- Beni Montresor, 75, Italian artist, illustrator and set designer, pancreatic cancer.
- Paul E. Riley, 59, American district judge (United States District Court for the Southern District of Illinois).

=== 12 ===
- Richard Buckle, 85, British ballet critic.
- Ruth Goetz, 89, American playwright (The Heiress) and screenwriter.
- Quintin Hogg, Baron Hailsham of St Marylebone, 94, British lawyer and politician.
- John T. Robinson, 78, South African palaeontologist.
- Eddie Rodriguez, 69, Filipino film actor and director, heart attack.
- Hans Saksvik, 75, Norwegian footballer.
- Branko Stinčić, 78, Croatian football player.
- Witold Szalonek, 74, Polish composer.
- Otis Young, 69, American actor (The Outcasts, The Last Detail), stroke.
- Hikmet Şimşek, Turkish orchestra conductor.

=== 13 ===
- José Capmany, 40, Costa Rican songwriter and guitarist, traffic collision.
- Jean Daninos, 94, Greek-French constructor of luxury cars Facel Vega.
- Peter Doyle, 52, Australian pop singer (The New Seekers), esophageal cancer.
- Ubi Dwyer, 68, Irish anarchist, complications following bicycle accident.
- Fritz Fromm, 88, German Olympic field handball player (1936).
- B. L. Graham, 87, American college basketball player and coach (Ole Miss).
- Glenn Johnson, 79, American gridiron football player (New York Yankees, Green Bay Packers, Winnipeg Blue Bombers).
- Raoul Kraushaar, 93, American composer.
- David Neil MacKenzie, 75, British linguist.
- Jal Minocher Mehta, Indian surgeon, social worker and philanthropist.
- Pal Mirashi, 75, Albanian football player.
- Mwanza Mukombo, 55, Congolese football player.
- Olga Arsenievna Oleinik, 76, Soviet and Russian mathematician.
- David Gribble , 17, British Gameshow Contestant Robot Wars (TV series).

=== 14 ===
- Giorgio Cavedon, 70, Italian publisher, cartoonist and screenwriter.
- Willam Christensen, 99, American ballet dancer, choreographer and founder of the San Francisco Ballet and Ballet West in Salt Lake City, Utah.
- Edgard Derouet, 90, French painter.
- David V. Erdman, 89, American literary critic, editor, and academic.
- Eugene Grebenik, 82, British academic and demographer.
- Vernon Harrison, 89, British photographer and parapsychologist.
- David Lewis, 60, American philosopher.
- Bert Rose, 82, American football executive.
- Ben Sankey, 94, American baseball player (Pittsburgh Pirates).
- Joseph Allen Stein, 89, American architect.

=== 15 ===
- Jamie Cann, 55, British Labour Party politician, liver disease.
- Zhang Xueliang, 100, Chinese warlord and military figure, pneumonia.
- Ralph Levy, 80, American producer, film and television director.
- Anne Ridler, 89, British poet and editor.
- Robert Rutledge, 53, American sound engineer (Back to the Future, Star Wars, One Flew Over the Cuckoo's Nest), Oscar winner (1986), heart attack.
- Janet Shaw, 82, American actress, Alzheimer's disease.
- Bent Tomtum, 52, Norwegian ski jumper and Olympian (1968).

=== 16 ===
- Jean Danet, 77, French actor.
- Gotthold Gloger, 77, German writer and painter.
- Etta Jones, 72, American jazz singer, cancer.
- Yuri Ozerov, 80, Soviet film director and screenwriter.
- Reid Smith, 52, American film and television actor.

=== 17 ===
- Frank Anscombe, 83, English statistician.
- Frances Claudet, 90, Canadian Olympic pair skater (1932).
- Jay Livingston, 86, American composer (Academy Award for Best Original Song for "Buttons and Bows", "Mona Lisa" and "Que Sera, Sera").
- Micheline Ostermeyer, 78, French Olympic champion (1948), and concert pianist.
- Jack Smith, 77, American NASCAR driver, congestive heart failure.
- Gyula Szilágyi, 78, Hungarian football player.
- Rehavam Ze'evi, 75, Israeli army general and politician, shot.

=== 18 ===
- Ferris Fain, 80, American baseball player, complications from leukemia and diabetes.
- János Kulka, 71, Hungarian conductor and composer.
- Ray Lovejoy, 62, British film editor (2001: A Space Odyssey, The Shining, Aliens), heart attack.
- Dan Nugent, 48, American gridiron football player (Washington Redskins), leukemia.
- A. T. Ummer, 68, Indian music composer.

=== 19 ===
- Charlie Bryant, 60, American footballer player (St. Louis Cardinals, Atlanta Falcons).
- Araquem de Melo, 57, Brazilian football player, suicide.
- Kay Dick, 86, English journalist, novelist and autobiographer.
- Woody Dumart, 84, Canadian ice hockey player (Boston Bruins).
- Yang Jingren, 83, Chinese politician.
- Leslie Johnston, 81, Scottish football player.
- Niaz Khan, 84, Pakistani Olympic field hockey player (1948, 1952).
- Jagernath Lachmon, 85, Surinamese politician.
- Hugh Mulcahy, 88, American baseball player (Philadelphia Phillies, Pittsburgh Pirates).
- Joe Murray, 80, American baseball player (Philadelphia Athletics).
- Digna Ochoa, 37, Mexican human rights lawyer, shot.
- Franz Raule, 80, Austrian Olympic field hockey player (1948, 1952).

=== 20 ===
- Philippe Agostini, 91, French cinematographer, director and screenwriter.
- Marko Hirsma, 36, Finnish musician, outlaw biker and gangster, shot.
- Frank Hodgkinson, 82, Australian painter and graphic artist.
- Patricia Locke, 73, Native American educator-activist, heart failure.
- Henri Pellizza, 81, French badminton and tennis player.
- Nebojša Popović, 78, Serbian basketball player and coach.
- John H. Terry, 76, American lawyer and politician.

=== 21 ===
- Thomas G. Barnes, 90, American creationist.
- George Feyer, 92, Hungarian-American cafe pianist and entertainer.
- William J. Healy, 62, American politician.
- Mieczysław Kasprzycki, 90, Polish ice hockey player, coach, and Olympian (1936, 1948).
- Bertie Mee, 82, English footballer.
- John H. Plumb, 90, British historian.
- David Lowell Rich, 81, American film director and producer.

=== 22 ===
- Bengt Ahlström, 76, Finnish Olympic rower (1952).
- Roger Coggio, 67, French actor, film director and screenwriter, cancer.
- Howard Finster, 84, American artist and baptist minister.
- Ernest Hilgard, 97, American psychologist and professor at Stanford University.
- Bill James, 75, New Zealand rower.
- Samuel Khachikian, 78, Iranian film director, author, and film editor.
- Norman Lessing, 90, American television screenwriter, playwright, and chess master, Parkinson's disease.
- Katsuo Nishida, 72, Japanese Olympic long-distance runner (1952).
- Ramakrishna, 62, Indian actor.
- Jan Glastra van Loon, 81, Dutch politician.
- Ed Vijent, 38, Dutch football player, stabbed.
- Georgy Vitsin, 84, Soviet and Russian actor, cardiovascular disease.
- Diana Van der Vlis, 66, Canadian-American actress, cardiac arrest.

=== 23 ===
- Ken Aston, 86, British football referee.
- Thomas N. Downing, 82, American lawyer and politician, member of the United States House of Representatives (1959-1977).
- Josh Kirby, 72, British artist.
- Ismat T. Kittani, 72, Iraqi politician.
- Kenneth P. MacLeod, 78, American politician.
- Sylvester Perry Ryan, 83, Canadian politician, member of the House of Commons of Canada (1962-1972).
- Cor Tabak, 94, Dutch Olympic weightlifter (1928).
- Linden Travers, 88, British actress (The Lady Vanishes, No Orchids for Miss Blandish).
- Stanisław Urbańczyk, 92, Polish linguist and academic.
- Daniel Wildenstein, 84, French art dealer, historian and owner of thoroughbred race horses.

=== 24 ===
- Kathleen Ankers, 82, American theatrical and television set and costume designer (Late Night with David Letterman, The Rosie O'Donnell Show).
- Kim Gardner, 53, English musician (Badger, Ashton, Gardner & Dyke, The Birds, The Creation), cancer.
- Eugenio Granell, 88, Spanish painter (often described as "the last Spanish surrealist painter").
- Jaromil Jireš, 65, Czech film director and screenwriter.
- Bill Mueller, 80, American baseball player (Chicago White Sox).
- Connie Pleban, 87, American ice hockey coach.
- Seishiro Shimatani, 62, Japanese football player and manager, cirrhosis.
- François Verger, 89, French Olympic field hockey player (1936).
- Stephen Wurm, 79, Hungarian-Australian linguist.

=== 25 ===
- Jack Blackwell, 91, English footballer.
- Alvan Feinstein, 75, American clinician, researcher and an epidemiologist.
- Marvin Harris, 74, American anthropologist.
- Richard Kirby, 97, Australian judge and arbitrator.
- René Philombe, 70, Cameroonian writer, journalist, poet, and playwright.

=== 26 ===
- Larry Aldrich, 95, American fashion designer and art collector.
- Maragatham Chandrasekar, 84, Indian politician and Member of Parliament.
- Soraya Esfandiari-Bakhtiari, 69, queen consort of Iran as wife of Shah Mohammad Reza Pahlavi, stroke.
- Laszlo Halasz, 96, Hungarian-American music director (New York City Opera).
- Abdul Haq, 43, Afghan mujahideen commander, executed by the Taliban, homicide.
- Hüseyin Hilmi Işık, 90, Turkish Sunni Islamic scholar.
- Eugene Jackson, 84, American child actor (Our Gang, The Big Town, Shootin' Injuns, Little Annie Rooney, The Addams Family), heart attack.
- Elizabeth Jennings, 75, English poet.
- Kris Kovick, 50, California-based writer, cartoonist, and printer, breast cancer.
- Olga Lehmann, 89, Chilean-British visual artist.
- John Platts-Mills, 95, British politician and lawyer.
- Richard Seifert, 90, Swiss-British architect.
- Gerald B. H. Solomon, 71, American businessman and politician.
- Barbara Tropp, 53, American orientalist, chef, and food writer, ovarian cancer.
- Audrey Withers, 96, English journalist.

=== 27 ===
- Fulvio Balatti, 63, Italian rower and Olympian (1960, 1964).
- Arthur Blickenstorfer, 66, Swiss Olympic equestrian (1968).
- Seán Condon, 78, Irish hurler.
- Giorgio Ravalli, 76, Italian Olympic field hockey player (1952).
- John P. Roberts, 56, American businessman, promoter of the Woodstock Festival, cancer.
- Sophie Tatischeff, 55, French film editor and director, lung cancer.
- Jaakko Tuominen, 57, Finnish Olympic hurdler (1964, 1968).
- Dirk Willem van Krevelen, 86, Dutch chemical engineer.

=== 28 ===
- Richard Halsey Best, 91, United States Navy dive bomber pilot during World War II.
- Grigori Chukhrai, 80, Soviet and Russian film director and screenwriter, heart failure.
- Jallouli Fares, 92, Tunisian politician.
- Gerard Hengeveld, 90, Dutch pianist, composer and educator.
- Hans Hohenester, 84, German bobsledder and Olympian (1956).
- Leonard Melfi, 69, American playwright and actor, congestive heart failure.
- John Mogg, 88, British army general.
- Czesław Mordowicz, 82, Polish Holocaust survivor during World War II.

=== 29 ===
- Angelo Ippolito, 78, Italian-American painter (Museum of Modern Art, Whitney Museum of American Art, Metropolitan Museum of Art).
- Milorad B. Protić, 90, Serbian astronomer.
- Spike Robinson, 71, American jazz tenor saxophonist.
- Freddie Silva, 63, Sri Lankan actor, singer.
- K. P. Ummer, 71, Indian film actor.

=== 30 ===
- Carlos Alberto Zolim Filho, 79, Brazilian football player and manager.
- Marga Legal, 93, German actress, traffic collision.
- Johnny Lucadello, 82, American baseball player (St. Louis Browns, New York Yankees).
- Yoritsune Matsudaira, 94, Japanese composer of contemporary classical music.
- Maurice Miller, 81, British politician.
- Jack Scott, 85, New Zealand politician.

=== 31 ===
- Colin Campbell, 59, Canadian video artist, cancer.
- Régine Cavagnoud, 31, French Olympic (1992, 1994, 1998), and World Cup alpine ski racer (2001 World Champion in Super G), fall.
- Yutaka Fujimoto, 50, Japanese Olympic basketball player (1976).
- Warren Elliot Henry, 92, American physicist.
- Jenny Laird, 89, British actress.
- Earl R. Larson, 89, American district judge (United States District Court for the District of Minnesota).
- Bill Le Sage, 74, British musician.
- Angus MacVicar, 93, British author.
- Vijaya Narasimha, 74, Indian lyricist.
- Braj Kumar Nehru, 92, Indian diplomat and ambassador.
- Richard Martin Stern, 86, American novelist.
- Art Wall, Jr., 77, American golfer (1959 winner of the Masters Tournament).
- Paul Warnke, 81, American diplomat.
