= Denmark at the 1956 Summer Olympics =

- IOC code: DEN
- NOC: Danish Olympic Committee

in Melbourne/Stockholm
- Competitors: 31 in 10 sports
- Flag bearer: Ole Hviid Jensen (Melbourne)
- Medals Ranked 20th: Gold 1 Silver 2 Bronze 1 Total 4

Summer Olympics appearances (overview)
- 1896; 1900; 1904; 1908; 1912; 1920; 1924; 1928; 1932; 1936; 1948; 1952; 1956; 1960; 1964; 1968; 1972; 1976; 1980; 1984; 1988; 1992; 1996; 2000; 2004; 2008; 2012; 2016; 2020; 2024

Other related appearances
- 1906 Intercalated Games

Denmark competed at the 1956 Summer Olympics in Melbourne, Australia and Stockholm, Sweden (equestrian events). 31 competitors, 27 men and 4 women, took part in 25 events in 10 sports.

== Medalists ==
=== Gold ===
- Paul Elvstrøm — Sailing, Men's Finn Individual Competition

=== Silver ===
- Lis Hartel — Equestrian, Dressage Individual
- Ole Berntsen, Christian von Bülow and Cyril Andresen — Sailing, Men's Dragon Team Competition

=== Bronze ===
- Tove Søby — Canoeing, Women's K1 500 metres Kayak Singles

== Cycling ==
Time trial

- Allan Juel Larsen — 1:14.3 (→ 13th place)

Individual road race

- Palle Lykke Jensen — did not finish (→ no ranking)

== Diving ==
Women

Athlete	Event	Preliminary		Final			
Athlete	Event	Points	Rank	Points	Rank	Total	Rank
Hanna Laursen	10 m platform	35.39	17	Did not advance			

== Fencing ==
One fencer represented Denmark in 1956.

Women's foil

- Karen Lachmann

== Rowing ==
Denmark had seven male rowers participate in three out of seven rowing events in 1956.

Men's coxless pair

- Finn Pedersen
- Kjeld Østrøm

Men's coxless four

- Elo Tostenæs
- Mogens Sørensen
- Børge Hansen
- Tage Grøndahl

Men's coxed four

- Elo Tostenæs
- Mogens Sørensen
- Børge Hansen
- Tage Grøndahl
- John Vilhelmsen (cox)

== Sailing ==
Open

Athlete	Event	Race							Net points	Final rank
Athlete	Event	1	2	3	4	5	6	7	Net points	Final rank
Paul Elvstrøm	Finn	1	8	~~15~~	1	1	1	1	7509	Gold medal
Ole Berntsen; Cyril Andresen; Christian von Bülow	Dragon	1	4	4	2	2	2	~~6~~	5723	Silver medal

== Shooting ==
Two shooters represented Denmark in 1956.

50 m rifle, three positions

- Uffe Schultz Larsen
- Ole Hviid Jensen

50 m rifle, prone

- Uffe Schultz Larsen
- Ole Hviid Jensen

== Swimming ==
Men

Athlete	Event	Heat		Final	
Athlete	Event	Time	Rank	Time	Rank
Knud Gleie	200 m breaststroke	2:36.4	2 Q	2:40.0	6

Women

Athlete	Event	Heat		Final	
Athlete	Event	Time	Rank	Time	Rank
Jytte Hansen	200 m breaststroke	2:59.8	9	Did not advance	
