= Deaths in August 2002 =

The following is a list of notable deaths in August 2002.

Entries for each day are listed alphabetically by surname. A typical entry lists information in the following sequence:

- Name, age, country of citizenship at birth, subsequent country of citizenship (if applicable), reason for notability, cause of death (if known), and reference.

== August 2002 ==
=== 1 ===
- Francisco Arcellana, 85, Filipino writer, poet and journalist.
- Theo Bruce, 79, Australian Olympic athlete (1948).
- Peter Carter, 37, Australian tennis player and coach, traffic collision.
- Adolf Glunz, 86, German Luftwaffe flying ace during World War II.
- Bjørn Gundersen, 78, Norwegian Olympic high jumper (1948, 1952).
- Sumiko Hidaka, 79, Japanese actress, liver failure.
- Yuri Korshunov, 68, Russian lepidopterologist.
- A. P. Lutali, 82, Governor of American Samoa (1985–1989, 1993–1997), stroke.
- Henry Mazer, 84, American-Taiwanese conductor and recording artist.
- Don Owen, 90, American professional wrestling promoter.
- Jack Tighe, 88, American baseball coach.

=== 2 ===
- Joe Allison, 77, American songwriter, radio and television personality and record producer, lung disease.
- Roberto Cobo, 72, Mexican actor (Los Olvidados, The Place Without Limits).
- May Hardcastle, 89, Australian tennis player.
- Ilona Kolonits, 80, Hungarian documentary film director and news correspondent.
- Roy Kral, 80, American jazz pianist and vocalist, congestive heart failure.
- Magda László, 90, Hungarian operatic soprano.
- Richard Schreder, 86, American naval aviator and sailplane developer.
- Jean-Pierre Yvaral, 68, French op art and kinetic art artist.

=== 3 ===
- Edward Brodney, 92, American artist, known for his drawings and paintings of World War II.
- Kathleen Hughes-Hallett, 84, Canadian Olympic fencer (1936).
- Peter Miles, 64, American actor, cancer.
- Danny Sue Nolan, 79, American film actress, stroke.
- Carmen Silvera, 80, British television and theatre actress (Dad's Army, 'Allo 'Allo!), lung cancer.
- Ruudi Toomsalu, 89, Estonian Olympic athlete (1936).
- John G. Zimmerman, 74, American photographer, an innovator in sports photojournalism.

=== 4 ===
- William R. Crawford Jr., 74, American diplomat and ambassador (Yemen, Cyprus).
- Basil Henricus, 79, Sri Lankan Olympic boxer (1952).
- Millard Lang, 89, American soccer and lacrosse player.
- Mike Payne, 40, American Major League Baseball player (Atlanta Braves), EEE.
- Salvatore Scianamea, 83, Brazilian Olympic fencer (1948).

=== 5 ===
- Jes Peter Asmussen, 73, Danish iranologist.
- Francisco Coloane, 92, Chilean novelist and short fiction writer.
- Josh Ryan Evans, 20, American actor (Passions, How the Grinch Stole Christmas) and stunt performer (Baby Geniuses), complications from a heart condition.
- Chick Hearn, 85, television and radio announcer for the Los Angeles Lakers basketball team since 1960, fall.
- Willis Hudlin, 96, American baseball player (Cleveland Indians, Washington Senators, St. Louis Browns, New York Giants).
- Franco Lucentini, 82, Italian writer (The Sunday Woman), suicide.
- Shinsuke Mikimoto, 71, Japanese actor, lung cancer.
- Darrell Porter, 50, American baseball player (Milwaukee Brewers, Kansas City Royals, St. Louis Cardinals, Texas Rangers), drug overdose.
- Matt Robinson, 65, American actor, writer and television producer, Parkinson's disease.
- Winifred Watson, 95, English writer (Miss Pettigrew Lives for a Day).

=== 6 ===
- Jim Crawford, 54, Scottish motor racing driver, liver failure.
- Edsger W. Dijkstra, 72, Dutch computer scientist, colorectal cancer.
- John Donnelly Fage, 81, British historian.
- Splinter Johnson, 82, American basketball player.
- Justin Meyer, 63, American vintner and enologist, heart attack.
- Jean Sauvagnargues, 87, French politician.

=== 7 ===
- Eric Bongers, 78, South African Olympic sailor (1956).
- Dominick Browne, 4th Baron Oranmore and Browne, 100, British aristocrat.
- Ookie Miller, 92, American gridiron football player (Chicago Bears, Cleveland Rams, Green Bay Packers).
- Egon Schidan, 71, German Olympic boxer (1952).
- Al Smith, 56, Canadian ice hockey player, pancreatic cancer.
- Wan Da, 83, Chinese politician.

=== 8 ===
- Bernard Chidzero, 75, Zimbabwean politician, Finance Minister (1983–1995).
- Al Donelli, 84, American football player (Pittsburgh Steelers, Philadelphia Eagles).
- Reiner Geye, 52, German football player, liver disease.
- Wilber Morris, 64, American jazz double bass player and bandleader.
- Mikhail Perlman, 79, Soviet gymnast and Olympic champion (1952).
- Charles Poletti, 99, American lawyer and politician.
- Kapitolina Rumiantseva, 76, Russian Soviet realist painter and graphic artist.
- Doris Buchanan Smith, 68, American author children's books, ALS.
- Ronnie Stephenson, 65, English jazz drummer.
- Frans Tebak, 74, Dutch footballer.
- Willie Young, 90, American baseball player.
- Willi Ziegler, 73, German paleontologist.

=== 9 ===
- Don Chastain, 66, American actor and singer (Alfred Hitchcock Hour, Colt .45, The Rockford Files, Hawaii Five-O), colorectal cancer.
- Pascale de Boysson, 80, French actress.
- Jake Fendley, 73, American professional basketball player (Northwestern University, Fort Wayne Pistons).
- Meredith Gardner, 89, American linguist and codebreaker.
- Al Grenert, 83, American basketball player.
- Bill Heusner, 75, American swimmer and Olympian (1948).
- Bertold Hummel, 76, German composer of modern classical music.
- Peter Matz, 73, American musician, composer, arranger and conductor, lung cancer.
- Paul Samson, 49, English guitarist, cancer.
- Gennady Slepnyov, 81, Soviet Russian Olympic sprinter (1952).
- Ruud van Feggelen, 78, Dutch water polo player, coach, and Olympian (1948, 1952).
- Trần Độ, 78, Vietnamese politician and Lieutenant General of the People's Army.

=== 10 ===
- Colin Eggleston, 60, Australian film and television director and writer (Long Weekend, Homicide).
- Michael Houser, 40, American guitarist, pancreatic cancer.
- Kristen Nygaard, 75, Norwegian computer scientist and politician, heart attack.
- Eugene Odum, 88, American biologist.
- René Queyroux, 74, French fencer and Olympic medalist (1956).
- Nils Rikberg, 74, Finnish footballer and Olympian (1952).
- Mordecai Waxman, 85, American rabbi, prominent conservative, known for confronting Pope John Paul II.
- Doris Wishman, 90, American B movie film director, screenwriter and producer, lymphoma.
- Czesław Łuczak, 80, Polish historian focusing on World War II.

=== 11 ===
- Nancy Chaffee, 73, American tennis player (1950, 1951, 1952 singles and doubles U.S. Indoor Champion), cancer.
- Per Cock-Clausen, 89, Danish figure skater (13-time Danish National Champion), and Olympian (1948, 1952).
- Mick Dunne, 73, Irish sports journalist.
- Jiří Kolář, 87, Czech poet and writer.
- Franjo Kukuljević, 92, Croatian tennis player.
- Hermann Pálsson, 81, Icelandic language scholar and translator.
- Galen Rowell, 61, American wilderness photographer, photojournalist and climber, plane crash.
- Viktor Vlasov, 76, Soviet Russian basketball player and Olympian (1952).
- Richard Wood, Baron Holderness, 81, British politician (Member of Parliament for Bridlington).

=== 12 ===
- John H. Leith, 82, American presbyterian theologian and minister.
- Michael De-la-Noy, 68, British journalist and author (The Queen Behind the Throne).
- Knud Lundberg, 82, Danish sportsperson, journalist, writer, and Olympian (1948, 1952).
- John Shaw Rennie, 85, British diplomat.
- Enos Slaughter, 86, American baseball player (St. Louis Cardinals, New York Yankees, Kansas City Athletics) and member of the MLB Hall of Fame, lymphoma.
- Marjorie Williamson, 89, British educator, physicist and university administrator.

=== 13 ===
- Jack Creel, 86, American baseball player (St. Louis Cardinals).
- Hermann Haller, 88, Swiss composer.
- Dieter Koslar, 62, German Olympic cyclist (1968).
- Józef Daniel Krzeptowski, 81, Polish Olympic skier (1948, 1956).
- Ulises Ramos, 82, Chilean footballer and manager.
- Willy Saeren, 78, Belgian footballer.
- Al Vande Weghe, 86, American competition swimmer and Olympic silver medalist (1936).

=== 14 ===
- Elisabeth Grasser, 98, Austrian Olympic fencer (1936).
- Ricardo Héber, 74, Argentine javelin thrower and Olympian (1948, 1952).
- Mary Heeley, 91, British tennis player.
- Peter R. Hunt, 77, British film editor (Dr. No, Goldfinger) and director (On Her Majesty's Secret Service), heart failure.
- Raoul Mollet, 89, Belgian Olympic modern pentathlete (1936, 1948).
- Larry Rivers, 78, American painter.
- Dave Williams, 30, American singer of Drowning Pool, heart failure.

=== 15 ===
- János Balogh, 89, Hungarian zoologist, ecologist, and academic.
- Henry Batista, 88, American film and television editor.
- Heinz Bauer, 74, German mathematician.
- Alberto Bertuccelli, 78, Italian football player.
- Jesse Brown, 58, American United States Marine and United States Secretary of Veterans Affairs, ALS.
- Philippe Chancerel, 77, French Olympic sailor (1948, 1956).
- George Agbazika Innih, 63, Nigerian army general and politician.
- Edgardo Madinabeytia, 69, Argentine football goalkeeper.
- Arnie Moser, 87, American baseball player (Cincinnati Reds).
- Kyle Rote, 73, American gridiron football player (New York Giants), heart attack.
- Jean Stengers, 80, Belgian historian.
- Haim Yosef Zadok, 88, Israeli jurist and politician, heart attack.

=== 16 ===
- Edith Addams, 95, Belgian Olympic fencer (1928).
- Janusz Bardach, 83, Polish-American Siberian gulag survivor and renowned plastic surgeon.
- Allan Bromley, 55, American computer scientist, historian of computing, cancer.
- Jeff Corey, 88, American actor (Butch Cassidy and the Sundance Kid, In Cold Blood, Little Big Man), fall.
- Martin Deutsch, 85, Austrian-American physicist and professor of physics at MIT, known as the discoverer of positronium.
- Morgan "Bill" Evans, 92, American horticulturalist and Disney landscape designer.
- Anton Guadagno, 77, Italian operatic conductor.
- Frans Laporta, 95, Belgian architect.
- Paul Michel Gabriel Lévy, 91, Belgian journalist and professor.
- Abu Nidal, 65, Palestinian terrorist, ballistic trauma.
- Jean Peytel, 93, French Olympic sailor (1932, 1936, 1948, 1960).
- Ola Belle Reed, 85, American singer.
- John Roseboro, 69, American baseball player (Brooklyn/Los Angeles Dodgers, Minnesota Twins, Washington Senators).

=== 17 ===
- Jimmy Bloodworth, 85, American baseball player (Detroit Tigers, Pittsburgh Pirates, Cincinnati Reds, Philadelphia Phillies), heart attack.
- Edward Dziewoński, 85, Polish stage and film actor, and theatre director.
- Alicia Montoya, 82, Mexican actress, the daughter of the stage actress, kidney failure.
- Valentin Pluchek, 92, Russian theatre director.
- Rushyendramani, 85, Indian singer, dancer, and actress.
- Benjamin Thompson, 84, American architect.

=== 18 ===
- Turpal-Ali Atgeriyev, 33, Chechen rebel leader and top official in the rebel government, leukemia.
- Carter L. Burgess, 85, American public servant, business executive and diplomat (Assistant Secretary of Defense, Ambassador to Argentina).
- Bertil Ericsson, 93, Swedish football player and Olympian (1936).
- Ričardas Gavelis, 51, Lithuanian writer, playwright, journalist, and theoretical physicist.
- Davison Lishebo, 47, Zambian Olympic athlete (1980, 1984).
- Dick O'Connell, 87, American front office executive in Major League Baseball.
- Dean Riesner, 83, American screenwriter (Dirty Harry, Play Misty for Me, The Enforcer).

=== 19 ===
- Antonio Barrios, 92, Spanish football player and coach.
- Eduardo Chillida, 78, Spanish Basque sculptor, Alzheimer's disease.
- Irving Copi, 85, American philosopher, logician and textbook author (Introduction to Logic).
- Satchidananda Saraswati, 87, Indian yoga guru and religious teacher.
- Harry Sharratt, 72, English footballer and Olympian (1956).
- Jan Stenbeck, 59, Swedish business leader, media pioneer, sailor and financier.
- Alastair Gordon, 6th Marquess of Aberdeen and Temair, 82, British botanical artist and art critic.
- Sunday Silence, 16, American-bred thoroughbred race horse, winner of the Kentucky Derby and the Preakness Stakes.

=== 20 ===
- Wesley Bennett, 89, American basketball player.
- Chris Columbus, 100, American jazz drummer.
- Augustine Geve, Solomon Islands Cabinet Minister, assassinated.
- Teodor Keko, 43, Albanian writer, journalist, and politician, pancreatic cancer.
- John Willett, 85, British journalist and translator of the works of Bertolt Brecht into English.

=== 21 ===
- Mikayil Abdullayev, 80, Soviet and Azerbaijani painter.
- O. A. Bushnell, 89, American microbiologist, professor and writer.
- Oscar Plattner, 80, Swiss cyclist.
- Bror Rexed, 88, Swedish neuroscientist and professor.

=== 22 ===
- Mark Bucci, 78, American Broadway, film and television composer (The 13 Clocks, Seven in Darkness, Human Experiments).
- Richard Lippold, 87, American sculptor.
- Manuel Lora-Tamayo, 98, Spanish politician.
- Jim McFadden, 82, Irish-Canadian ice hockey player (Detroit Red Wings, Chicago Black Hawks).
- Mohamed Tarabulsi, 51, Lebanese weightlifter and Olympian (1968, 1972, 1980).

=== 23 ===
- Anthony Stafford Beer, 75, British theorist.
- Dennis Fimple, 61, American character actor (Petticoat Junction, Gomer Pyle, U.S.M.C., Green Acres), traffic collision.
- Emily Genauer, 91, American art critic.
- Wayne Simmons, 32, American gridiron football player (Green Bay Packers, Kansas City Chiefs, Buffalo Bills), single-car crash.
- Hoyt Wilhelm, 80, American baseball player (New York Giants, Baltimore Orioles, Chicago White Sox) and a member of the MLB Hall of Fame.

=== 24 ===
- Ted Ashley, 80, American film studio executive (chairman of Warner Bros) and talent agent, complications following heart surgery.
- Hugh Cruttwell, 83, English teacher of drama and principal of the Royal Academy of Dramatic Art.
- Nikolay Guryanov, 93, Russian Orthodox priest.
- Wilhelm Meise, 100, German ornithologist.
- Cornelis Johannes van Houten, 82, Dutch astronomer.
- Johnny Wilson, 86, American professional football player (Case Western Reserve University, Cleveland Rams).

=== 25 ===
- Per Anger, 88, Swedish diplomat, known for shielding thousands of Hungarian Jews from Nazi death camps, stroke.
- Raúl Chibás, 86, Cuban politician, military officer and close associate of Fidel Castro, defected to U.S. in 1960.
- Stanley R. Greenberg, 74, American playwright and screenwriter.
- Dorothy Coade Hewett, 79, Australian poet, playwright and novelist, breast cancer.
- Karolina Lanckorońska, 104, Polish noble, philanthropist, and historian.
- Július Pántik, 80, Slovak film actor.
- Åke Söderlund, 77, Swedish racewalker and Olympian (1952, 1960, 1964).
- William Warfield, 82, American concert bass-baritone singer and actor, complications following a fall.

=== 26 ===
- Aslambek Abdulkhadzhiev, 40, Chechen warlord, killed in action.
- Thomas Gordon, 84, American clinical psychologist.
- Vincent Massey, 75, Australian biochemist and enzymologist.
- Georg Werner, 98, Swedish Olympic swimmer (1924).

=== 27 ===
- Bob McKinlay, 69, Scottish football player.
- George Mitchell, 85, Scottish musician (The Black and White Minstrel Show).
- Crew Stoneley, 91, English athlete and Olympic silver medalist (1932).
- Jane Tilden, 91, Austrian actress.
- John S. Wilson, 89, American music critic for The New York Times for four decades.

=== 28 ===
- David Bierk, 58, American-Canadian artist, pneumonia.
- Fritz Feldmann, 86, Swiss Olympic rower (1936).
- Kay Gardner, 61, American musician, composer, author, and Dianic priestess, heart attack.
- Dick Nalley, 47, American Olympic bobsledder (1980).
- Sylvio de Magalhães Padilha, 93, Brazilian sports executive and Olympic athlete (1932, 1936).
- Else Petersen, 92, Danish film and stage actress.
- Rudolf Schnackenburg, 88, German Catholic priest and New Testament scholar.

=== 29 ===
- Lance Macklin, 82, British racing driver.
- Alan MacNaughtan, 82, Scottish actor, cancer.
- Paul Tripp, 91, American children's musician, author, songwriter, and actor.
- Anatoliy Yulin, 73, Soviet Belarusian Olympic athlete (1952, 1956).

=== 30 ===
- Thomas J. Anderson, 91, American publisher and politician.
- Mariya Bayda, 80, Russian medical orderly during World War II.
- Dave Dalby, 51, American professional football player (UCLA, Oakland/Los Angeles Raiders), traffic collision.
- José Sette Câmara Filho, 82, Brazilian lawyer, diplomat, and politician.
- Andy Johnson, 69, American basketball player (Philadelphia Warriors, Chicago Packers).
- Jack Lininger, 75, American football player (Detroit Lions).
- Zaid ibn Shaker, 67, Jordanian politician and soldier (Prime Minister of Jordan).
- J. Lee Thompson, 88, British film director (The Guns of Navarone, Cape Fear, Conquest of the Planet of the Apes), congestive heart failure.
- Horst Wendlandt, 80, German film producer.

=== 31 ===
- Lionel Hampton, 94, American jazz musician, heart failure.
- Sheldon H. Harris, 74, American historian and academic.
- Martin Kamen, 89, American scientist.
- Joe McCluskey, 91, American track and field athlete and Olympic medalist (1932, 1936).
- Farhad Mehrad, 58, Iranian pop, rock, and folk musician, hepatitis C.
- Wong Pow Nee, 90, Malaysian politician and diplomat.
- George Porter, 81, British Nobel Prize winner in chemistry.
- Bunji Sakita, 72, Japanese-American theoretical physicist, cancer.
- Samson Samsonov, 81, Soviet and Russian film director and screenwriter.
