= Argentina at the 1956 Summer Olympics =

- IOC code: ARG
- NOC: Argentine Olympic Committee

in Melbourne/Stockholm
- Competitors: 28 (27 men and 1 woman) in 8 sports
- Flag bearer: Isabel Avellán
- Medals Ranked 29th: Gold 0 Silver 1 Bronze 1 Total 2

Summer Olympics appearances (overview)
- 1900; 1904; 1908; 1912; 1920; 1924; 1928; 1932; 1936; 1948; 1952; 1956; 1960; 1964; 1968; 1972; 1976; 1980; 1984; 1988; 1992; 1996; 2000; 2004; 2008; 2012; 2016; 2020; 2024; 2028

Argentina at the 1956 Summer Olympics in Melbourne, Australia and Stockholm, Sweden (equestrian events) was the nation's tenth appearance out of thirteen editions of the Summer Olympic Games. Argentina sent to the 1956 Summer Olympics its seventh national team, under the auspices of the Argentine Olympic Committee (Comité Olímpico Argentino), 28 athletes (27 men and the 1 woman), who competed in 27 events in 8 sports. They brought home 2 medals: 1 silver and 1 bronze. The Argentine flag bearer was Isabel Avellán, the nation's first female Olympic Games flag bearer.

== Medalists ==
Medal	Name	Sport	Event
Silver	Humberto Selvetti	Weightlifting	Men's Heavyweight
Bronze	Víctor Zalazar	Boxing	Men's Middleweight

== Athletics ==
Key

- Q = Qualified for the next round

Men
Field events

Athlete	Event	Qualification		Final	
Athlete	Event	Result	Rank	Result	Rank
Günther Kruse	Discus throw	47.87	11 Q	49.89	11

Women
Field events

Athlete	Event	Qualification		Final	
Athlete	Event	Result	Rank	Result	Rank
Isabel Avellán	Discus throw	43.66	9 Q	46.73	6

== Fencing ==
One fencer represented Argentina in 1956.

Men's foil

- Santiago Massini

Men's épée

- Santiago Massini

== Modern pentathlon ==
One male pentathlete represented Argentina in 1956.

- Luis Ribera

== Sailing ==
Open

Athlete	Event	Race														Final rank	
Athlete	Event	1		2		3		4		5		6		7		Final rank	
Athlete	Event	Score	Rank	Score	Rank	Score	Rank	Score	Rank	Score	Rank	Score	Rank	Score	Rank	Score	Rank
Esteban Luis Berisso	Finn	18	147	14	256	13	288	16	198	15	226	13	288	DNF	0	1403	18
Ovidio Manuel Lagos; Jorge Diego Brown	Star	9	226	6	402	10	180	DNF	0	9	226	DNF	0	9	226	1260	11
Jorge Salas Chávez; Arnoldo Pekelharing; Boris Adolfo Belada	Dragon	3	828	8	402	2	1004	7	460	DNF	0	3	828	4	703	4225	4

== Shooting ==
Four shooters represented Argentina in 1956.

25 m pistol

- Oscar Cervo

50 m pistol

- Alberto Martijena

Trap

- Juan Gindre
- León Bozzi
