= David Howard (sailor) =

Canadian sailor (1918–2023)

Dave Howard
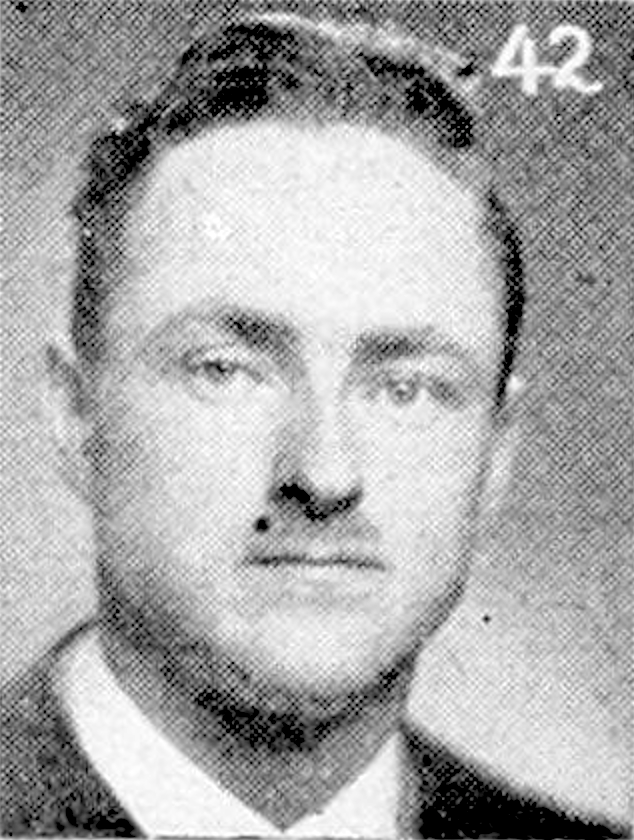
- Howard pictured c. 1948 at the University of Toronto

Personal information
- Full name: David Ewart Howard
- Born: 5 March 1918 Port Arthur, Ontario, Canada
- Died: 21 January 2023 (aged 104)

Sport
- Sport: Sailing

David Ewart Howard (5 March 1918 – 21 January 2023) was a Canadian sailor who competed in the 1956 Summer Olympics.

Just prior to his death at age 104, Howard was the second oldest Olympian in the world after Uruguayan sailor Félix Sienra who died 9 days later at age 107. With Howard's death, alpine skier Rhoda Wurtele became the oldest Canadian Olympian at age 101, and Stanley Leibel became the oldest Canadian summer Olympian at age 95.

== Early life and military career ==
When young, Howard and his four brothers were yachting enthusiasts, all having graduated from the Royal Canadian Yacht Club’s junior program.

In 1941, Howard enlisted in the Royal Canadian Navy during World War II and reached the rank of lieutenant. On 18 February 1945, he was named commanding officer of HMCS Dundas.

== Athletic career ==
Howard participated in the 1954 Canada's Cup yacht race along with his younger brother, Clifford Howard. Howard competed in the dragon event in the 1956 Summer Olympic Games in Melbourne, Australia, on a team with his brother Cliff Howard and Donald Tytler.

Howard continuing competing in yachting, including the 1975 Canada's Cup race. He became a manager, syndicate member, and commodore of the Royal Canadian Yacht Club. In 2018, he was inducted to the Canadian Sailing Hall of Fame.

== Personal life and death ==
Howard was chairman of Citicom Inc., a Toronto-based property developer and management firm. In 1989, Howard became president of the Toronto Symphony Orchestra.

Howard died on 21 January 2023, at the age of 104.
