= Sailing at the 1956 Summer Olympics =

Sailing at the Games of the XVI Olympiad
- Venues: Port Phillip Bay
- Dates: First race: 26 November 1956; Last race: 5 December 1956
- Competitors: 154 from 28 nations
- Boats: 71

Sailing/Yachting is an Olympic sport starting from the Games of the 1st Olympiad (1896 Olympics in Greece. With the exception of 1904 and the canceled 1916 Summer Olympics, sailing has always been included on the Olympic schedule. The Sailing program of 1956 consisted of a total of five sailing classes (disciplines). For each class seven races were scheduled from 26 November to 5 December 1956 at Port Phillip Bay.

The sailing was done on the triangular type Olympic courses. The start was made in the center of a set of 8 numbered marks that were places in a circle. During the starting procedure the sequence of the marks was communicated to the sailors. By picking the mark that was most upwind the start could always be made upwind. This system is, at least in certain German lakes, still in use.

== Venue ==
Port Phillip Bay a natural bay of about 725 square miles (1,900 km^{2}) of water, free of reefs a mere 8 miles (13 km) from the Main Stadium of the Olympics. One can enter the bay from the Southern Ocean a narrow gap of about 3 km. Therefore, the course areas are almost free of tidal streams. However, there is a 0.5 m tidal rise. The winds are ideal for sailing. The predominant southerlies generates light airs in the morning. It freshens in the afternoon to up to 18 knots (33 km/h), and then easing and backing south-east in the evening.

Three circular courses were planned for the northern end of Port Phillip Bay, each using the 1936 system with 8 fixed buoy's with the start in the middle of the circle. At Sandringham for the Finn a course length of approximately 6 nautical miles (11 km) was used. For the 12 square metres and Star the length was set to about 10 nautical miles (19 km). The Dragon and 5.5 Metre were using a course length of 14 nautical miles (26 km).

== Competition ==
=== Overview ===
Continents	Countries	Classes	Boats	Male	Female
5	29	5	71	154	0

=== Continents ===
- Africa
- Asia
- Australian continent
- Europe
- Americas

=== Countries ===
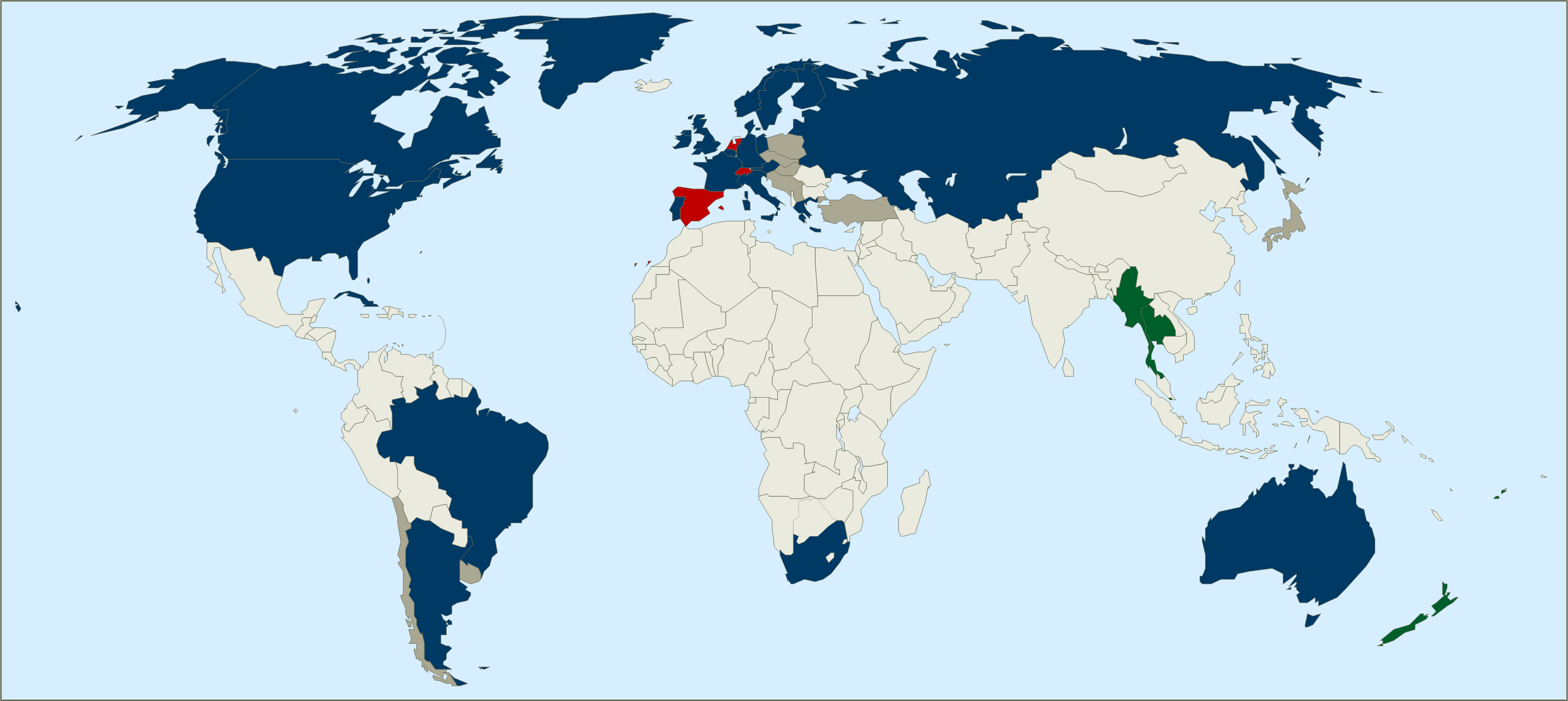
Countries that participated in the Sailing event of the 1956 Olympic Games. Blue: Water Gray: Never participated in OG Dark Gray: Participated in earlier OG Green: Country participated for the first time Dark Blue: Country participated also on previous games Red: Country boycotted the sailing event of the OG

== Participating nations ==
- Argentina (6)
- Australia (11)
- Austria (1)
- Bahamas (3)
- Belgium (1)
- Bermuda (3)
- Brazil (3)
- Burma (2)
- Canada (8)
- Cuba (2)
- Denmark (4)
- Fiji (1)
- Finland (3)
- France (8)
- United Team of Germany (9)
- Great Britain (12)
- Greece (2)
- Ireland (1)
- Italy (12)
- New Zealand (5)
- Norway (6)
- Portugal (5)
- Singapore (5)
- South Africa (6)
- Soviet Union (11)
- Sweden (7)
- Thailand (2)
- United States (13)

=== Classes (equipment) ===
The 1956 Olympic classes
Class	Type	Event	Sailors	Trapeze	Mainsail	Jib/Genoa	Spinnaker	First OG	Olympics so far
Finn	Dinghy		1	0	+	–	–	1952	2
12m^{2} Sharpie	Dinghy		2	0	+	+	–	1956	1
Star	Keelboat		2	0	+	+	–	1932	5
Dragon	Keelboat		3	0	+	+	+	1948	3
5.5 Metre	Keelboat		3	0	+	+	+	1952	2
Legend: = Male, = Female, = Open

== Medal summary ==
Event	Gold	Silver	Bronze
1956: Finn	Denmark (DEN); Paul Elvstrøm	Belgium (BEL); André Nelis	United States (USA); John Marvin
1956: 12 m^{2} Sharpie	New Zealand (NZL); Peter Mander; Jack Cropp	Australia (AUS); Rolland Tasker; John Scott	Great Britain (GBR); Jasper Blackall; Terence Smith
1956: Star	United States (USA); Herbert Williams; Lawrence Low	Italy (ITA); Agostino Straulino; Nicolò Rode	Bahamas (BAH); Durward Knowles; Sloane Farrington
1956: Dragon	Sweden (SWE); Folke Bohlin; Bengt Palmquist; Leif Wikström	Denmark (DEN); Ole Berntsen; Cyril Andresen; Christian von Bülow	Great Britain (GBR); Graham Mann; Ronald Backus; Jonathan Janson
1956: 5.5 Metre	Sweden (SWE); Lars Thörn; Hjalmar Karlsson; Sture Stork	Great Britain (GBR); Robert Perry; David Bowker; John Dillon; Neil Kennedy-Cochran-Patrick	Australia (AUS); Jock Sturrock; Douglas Buxton; Devereaux Mytton

== Medal table ==
Rank	Nation	Gold	Silver	Bronze	Total
1	Sweden	2	0	0	2
2	Denmark	1	1	0	2
3	United States	1	0	1	2
4	New Zealand	1	0	0	1
5	Great Britain	0	1	2	3
6	Australia	0	1	1	2
7	Belgium	0	1	0	1
7	Italy	0	1	0	1
9	Bahamas	0	0	1	1
Totals (9 entries)		5	5	5	15

== Remarks ==
=== Olympic boycott ===
1956 was the first time in history that several countries decided to boycott the Olympics. The boycott that influenced the sailing the most was probably that of The Netherlands, Spain, and Switzerland. They withdrew to protest against the Soviet Union invasion of Hungary during the 1956 Hungarian Revolution and Soviet presence at the Games. At that time The Netherlands dominated at the International competition in the 12m^{2} Sharpie.

=== Sailing ===
- This Olympic sailing event was gender independent, but turned out to be a Men-only event. This was one of the triggers to create gender specific events. This however had to wait until 1988.
- Classes were hosted by several local yacht clubs:
  - Sandringham Yacht Club: Finn
  - Elwood Sailing Club: 12m^{2} Sharpie
  - Royal St. Kilda Yacht Club: Star
  - Royal Brighton Yacht Club: Dragon
  - Royal Yacht Club of Victoria: 5.5 Metre
- The Royal St. Kilda Yacht Club was also the Sailing Headquarters
- Thirty-five Finn boats were built by a Melbourne firm of yacht builders. Other than in Helsinki, they were cold moulded shells of Queensland maple veneer. The mast and boom were of sitka spruce.
- The weather, throughout the series, was fine, with moderate sea breezes and pleasant sunshine. Except on 29 November ^{th} when the races in the Finn were postponed, several 12m^{2} Meter Sharpies capsized, only 5 out of 13 Sharpies could finish and the 5.5 Metre's of the Soviet Union and South Africa were dismasted.
- The courses were set by the Royal Australian Navy. The vessels: H.M.A.S. Warramunga, H.M.A.S. Swan and H.M.A.S. Sprightly acted as starting vessels.

=== Sailors ===
During the sailing regattas at the 1956 Summer Olympics among others the following persons were competing in the various classes:

- Denmark, Paul Elvstrøm in the Finn won his third consecutive Gold medal
- Canada, Bruce Kirby in the Finn, yacht designer of the Olympic Laser.
- New Zealand, Peter Mander won the first New Zealand Olympic gold medal in the 12m^{2} Sharpie, became later president of the New Zealand Yachting Federation.
- Great Britain, Graham Hargrave Mann helmed the dragon Bluebottle the wedding gift to Her Majesty the Queen.
- Australia, Jock Sturrock in the 5.5 Metres, won Australia's first medal in Olympic sailing. Later skipper of "Gretel" and "Dame Pattie", the first two Australian challengers for the America's Cup.
- Thailand, Prince of Thailand, Prinz Bhanubanda Bira in the Star
At the 1956 Olympic Games

== Notes ==
- World Sailing 1956 Olympic Microsite
- Olympics Sailing at the 1956 Summer Olympics at World Sailing
