= Gene Walet =

Gene Walet can refer to:

- Gene Walet Jr. (1901–1968), American Olympic sailor
- Gene Walet III (born 1935), American Olympic sailor
