= Clifford Howard =

Clifford Howard may refer to:

- Clifford Howard (writer), writer of 1916 films Purity and The Other Side of the Door
- Cliff Howard (1923-2008), Canadian Olympic sailor
- Clifford the dog in Clifford the Big Red Dog book series, whose owner is given surname "Howard" in the TV series
