= Cyril Andresen =

Danish sailor (1929–1977)

Personal information
- Full name: Cyril Romain Andresen
- Nationality: Denmark
- Born: 23 November 1929 Frederiksberg, Denmark
- Died: 12 September 1977 (aged 47) Gentofte, Denmark

Sailing career
- Sport: Sailing
- Club: Royal Danish Yacht Club
- Class: Dragon
Medal record
Sailing
Representing Denmark
Olympic Games
Silver medal – second place	1956 Melbourne	Dragon

Cyril Romain Andresen (23 November 1929 – 12 September 1977) was a Danish competitive sailor and Olympic medalist. He won a silver medal in the Dragon class at the 1956 Summer Olympics in Melbourne, together with Ole Berntsen and Christian von Bülow.
