= Klaus Baess =

Danish sailor (1924–2018)

Personal information
- Full name: Klaus Baard Baess
- Nationality: Danish
- Born: 10 November 1924 Frederiksberg, Denmark
- Died: 16 September 2018 (aged 93)

Sailing career
- Sport: Sailing
- Club: Royal Danish Yacht Club
- Class: Dragon
Medal record
Men's sailing
Representing Denmark
Olympic Games
| Bronze medal – third place | 1948 London | Dragon class |

Klaus Baard Baess (10 November 1924 – 16 September 2018) was a Danish competitive sailor and Olympic medalist. He was born in Frederiksberg. He won a bronze medal in the Dragon class at the 1948 Summer Olympics in London, together with William Berntsen and Ole Berntsen. Baess died on 16 September 2018 at the age of 93.
