= Capmany (surname) =

Capmany is a Spanish name borne by several people in Spanish-speaking parts of the world. Noted among them are:

- Antonio de Capmany y Montpalau (1742–1813), Spanish polygraph
- José Capmany (1961–2001), Costa Rican songwriter and guitarist
- Maria Aurèlia Capmany (1918–1991), Catalan novelist, playwright and essayist
- Rafael Zubarán Capmany (1875–1948), Mexican lawyer
