= Capucho =

Capucho is a surname. Notable people with the surname include:

- António Capucho (born 1945), Portuguese politician
- João Capucho (1916–1998), Portuguese sailor
- Capucho (footballer) (born 1972), Portuguese footballer
