= Sailing at the 1948 Summer Olympics – Dragon =

Sailing at the Olympics

Dragon at the Games of the XIV Olympiad
- 1948 Configuration
- Venue: Torbay
- Dates: 3–12 August
- Competitors: 47 from 12 nations
- Teams: 12

Medalists
1st place, gold medalist(s)		Thor Thorvaldsen; Sigve Lie; Håkon Barfod	Norway
2nd place, silver medalist(s)		Folke Bohlin; Hugo Johnson; Gösta Brodin	Sweden
3rd place, bronze medalist(s)		William Berntsen; Ole Berntsen; Klaus Baess	Denmark

The Dragon was a sailing event on the Sailing at the 1948 Summer Olympics program in Torbay. Seven races were scheduled. 47 sailors, on 12 boats, from 12 nations competed.

Silver medalist

== Results ==
Rank	Helmsman (Country)	Crew	Yachtname	Race I		Race II		Race III		Race IV		Race V		Race VI		Race VII		Total Points	Total -1
Rank	Helmsman (Country)	Crew	Yachtname	Rank	Points	Rank	Points	Rank	Points	Rank	Points	Rank	Points	Rank	Points	Rank	Points	Total Points	Total -1
1st place, gold medalist(s)	Thor Thorvaldsen (NOR)	Håkon Barfod; Sigve Lie	Pan	1	1180	2	879	12	101	1	1180	~~DSQ~~	~~0~~	3	703	3	703	4746	4746
2nd place, silver medalist(s)	Folke Bohlin (SWE)	Gösta Brodin; Hugo Johnson	Slaghoken	2	879	3	703	2	879	2	879	~~DSQ~~	~~0~~	12	101	1	1180	4621	4621
3rd place, bronze medalist(s)	William Berntsen (DEN)	Klaus Baess; Ole Berntsen	Snap	3	703	4	578	3	703	~~5~~	~~481~~	2	879	5	481	2	879	4704	4223
4	Eric Strain (GBR)	George Brown; Jack Wallace	Ceres II	7	335	7	335	1	1180	7	335	1	1180	~~9~~	~~226~~	4	578	4169	3943
5	Pino Canessa (ITA)	Bruno Bianchi; Luigi De Manincor	Ausonia	9	226	8	277	4	578	3	703	6	402	1	1180	~~DNF~~	~~0~~	3366	3366
6	Rainer Packalén (FIN)	Niilo Orama; Aatos Hirvisalo	Vinha	4	578	1	1180	~~11~~	~~139~~	6	402	4	578	11	139	10	180	3196	3057
7	Roberto Sieburger (ARG)	Jorge Salas Chávez; Jorge del Río Sálas; A. Suner	Pampero	6	402	5	481	8	277	4	578	9	226	2	879	~~DNF~~	~~0~~	2843	2843
8	Kees Jonker (NED)	Biem Dudok van Heel; Wim van Duyl	Joy	5	481	6	402	7	335	~~11~~	~~139~~	8	277	4	578	7	335	2547	2408
9	João Félix Capucho (POR)	António de Herédia; Henrique Sallaty; Carlos Lourenço	Argus	~~11~~	~~139~~	9	226	6	402	8	277	7	335	6	402	5	481	2262	2123
10	Marcel de Kerviler (FRA)	Jean Frain de la Gaulayrie; G. Bertin; Philippe Chancerel	Allegro	10	180	~~11~~	~~139~~	10	180	9	226	3	703	8	277	8	277	1982	1843
11	Henry Duys Jr. (USA)	F. Jackson Jr, Richard Jessup; Cebern Lovell Lee; Julian Roosevelt; Ralph Cook Craig	Rhythm	8	277	10	180	5	481	12	101	~~DNF~~	~~0~~	10	180	6	402	1621	1621
12	Albert Huybrechts (BEL)	Roger Anciaux; Charles Delfosse; Georges Hellebuyck Jr. Jacques Lauwerys; Jacques Lippens	Dolfijn	12	101	~~DNF~~	~~0~~	9	226	10	180	5	481	7	335	9	226	1549	1549

DNF = Did Not Finish, DNS= Did Not Start, DSQ = Disqualified
= Male, = Female

=== Daily standings ===
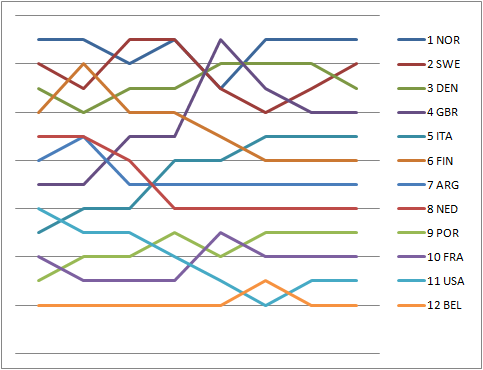
Graph showing the daily standings in the Dragon during the 1948 Summer Olympics

== Courses at Torbay ==
A total of three race area's was positioned by the Royal Navy in Torbay. Each of the classes was using the same kind of course and the same scoring system.
