= PJ Phelan =

PJ Phelan is the name of:

- Paddy Phelan (cricketer)
- Paul James Phelan, a Canadian yachtsman and restaurateur
