= Roger Anciaux =

Belgian sailor

Personal information
- Nationality: Belgian
- Born: 30 October 1919 Brussels, Belgium

Sport
- Sport: Sailing

Roger Anciaux (born 30 October 1919, date of death unknown) was a Belgian sailor. He competed in the Dragon event at the 1948 Summer Olympics.
