= Robert Ho (sailor) =

Singaporean geographer and sailor (1921–1972)

Personal information
- Full name: Robert Ho Guan Hai
- Nationality: Singaporean
- Born: 23 November 1921 Kuala Lumpur, Federated Malay States
- Died: 16 January 1972 (aged 50) Canberra, Australia
- Education: Raffles College; King's College London
- Occupations: Geographer; academic; sailor

Sport
- Sport: Sailing

Robert Ho Guan Hai (23 November 1921 – 16 January 1972) was a Malaysian-born Singaporean geographer, academic, and sailor. Born in the Federated Malay States, Ho studied geography at the King's College in London. His early work focused on the physical geography of Singapore. He worked at the Universities of Singapore and Malaya, establishing the latter's geography department after being appointed its professor of geography in 1959. Having an interest in sailing, he competed in the Dragon event at the 1956 Summer Olympics. He died in Australia in 1972, being honoured by the University of Malaya by an award holding his name.

== Early life and education ==
Ho was born on 23 November 1921 in Kuala Lumpur, then a part of the Federated Malay States. His father Ho Seng Ong was an academic. He studied at the Anglo-Chinese School in Malacca and Raffles College (present-day National University of Singapore) in Singapore in 1939. During World War II, Ho resided in India, before heading to the United Kingdom after the war to study geography at the University of London's King's College. He graduated in 1948 and began working at Raffles College as an assistant lecturer in geography.

== Career ==
=== Geography career ===
Ho's early research work included physical geography; he surveyed the geomorphology of the Singapore Island and adjacent islands, focusing on the formation of mangroves and corals. He submitted this research in a master's thesis to the University of London in 1950. In Singapore, he also studied its physical environment of iron pans, mangroves, and soil. In 1953, he left for one year's study leave in England under Alex Muir and E. W. Russel of Rothamstead Experimental Station and the School of Agriculture, respectively. He studied different methods of sampling soil. Returning in 1954, Ho was then involved with a Land Use Survey of Singapore as its director; the results of the survey were published in 1960 by the University of Malaya with a grant from the Asia Foundation. From 1955 to 1956, Ho served on the Singapore government's Malayanisation Commission.

In 1958, Ho succeeded professor E. H. G. Dobby as the acting department head of geography at the University of Singapore. In 1959, he was appointed the professor of geography at the newly established University of Malaya and was given the role of establishing its Department of Geography. Ho created a departmental library, meteorological station, and curated a collection of 70,000 maps. As of 1973, the university's geography department was the largest in Southeast Asia, in terms of number of staff and students. In Malaya, he additionally directed the 1959 Land Use Survey of Klang Valley. In 1962, Ho visited West Germany's geographical departments and institutions under the German Academic Exchange Service. That same year, he also organised the first regional conference of the International Geographical Union in Kuala Lumpur. He additionally aided in setting up the Association of Malayan Geographers and was made its first president.

His later geographical work in Kuala Lumpur included studying surface runoff, infiltration, agricultural land use, and land development. In 1965, he left the University of Malaya to take up a position as Senior Research Fellow at the Australian National University's Research School of Pacific Studies in Canberra. Ho continued to research the agricultural, rural, and urban development of Malaysia.

=== Sailing career ===
Ho was described as an active sportsman. His interest in sailing emerged during the Malayan Emergency, when he served from 1948 to 1953 with the Singapore Royal Navy Volunteer Reserve; they engaged in anti-terrorist coastal patrols. In 1949, Ho was made the first Chinese officer of the Malayan Royal Navy Volunteer Reserve. In 1956, He competed in the Dragon event at the 1956 Summer Olympics in Melbourne, Australia.

== Death ==
He died on 16 January 1972 in Canberra, Australia. In his obituary by Tunku Shamsul Bahrin, he was described as "one of Malaysia's leading geographers". He was honoured by the University of Malaya in 1972 with a Robert Ho Gold Medal, which was presented annually to the best student of the graduating geography class.

== Selected articles ==
- Ho, Robert (1957). "Corrugated Iron Pan". Nature. 180: 1276–1277. doi:10.1038/1801276a0. eISSN 1476-4687. ISSN 0028-0836.
- Ho, Robert (June 1967). "Rubber Production by Peasants of the Terachi Valley, Malaya". Transactions of the Institute of British Geographers (41): 187–201. doi:10.2307/621335. JSTOR 621335.
- Ho, Robert (1970). "Land Ownership and Economic Prospects of Malayan Peasants". Modern Asian Studies. 4 (1): 83–92. JSTOR 311754.
