= Sailing at the 1956 Summer Olympics – Finn =

Sailing at the Olympics

Finn at the Games of the XVI Olympiad
- Venue: Port Phillip
- Dates: 26–30 November and 3–5 December
- Competitors: 20 from 20 nations
- Teams: 20

Medalists
1st place, gold medalist(s)		Paul Elvström	Denmark
2nd place, silver medalist(s)		André Nelis	Belgium
3rd place, bronze medalist(s)		John Marvin	United States

The Finn was a sailing event in the sailing program of the 1956 Summer Olympics, held on Port Phillip. Seven races were scheduled. 20 sailors, on 20 boats, from 20 nations competed.

== Results ==
Rank	Helmsman (Country)	Race I		Race II		Race III		Race IV		Race V		Race VI		Race VII		Total Points	Total -1
Rank	Helmsman (Country)	Rank	Points	Rank	Points	Rank	Points	Rank	Points	Rank	Points	Rank	Points	Rank	Points	Total Points	Total -1
1st place, gold medalist(s)	Paul Elvstrøm (DEN)	1	1402	8	499	~~15~~	~~226~~	1	1402	1	1402	1	1402	1	1402	7735	7509
2nd place, silver medalist(s)	Andre Nelis (BEL)	6	624	1	1402	~~DNF~~	~~0~~	2	1101	2	1101	3	925	2	1101	6254	6254
3rd place, bronze medalist(s)	John Marvin (USA)	2	1101	2	1101	~~8~~	~~499~~	3	925	3	925	2	1101	4	800	6452	5953
4	Jürgen Vogler (EUA)	~~DNF~~	~~0~~	3	925	2	1101	9	448	DNF	0	4	800	3	925	4199	4199
5	Rickard Sarby (SWE)	3	925	5	703	~~12~~	~~323~~	7	557	6	624	6	624	7	557	4313	3990
6	Eric Bongers (RSA)	12	323	12	323	1	1402	4	800	~~DNF~~	~~0~~	5	703	11	361	3912	3912
7	Adelchi Pelaschiar (ITA)	7	557	~~16~~	~~198~~	3	925	6	624	10	402	8	499	10	402	3607	3409
8	Bruce Kirby (CAN)	5	703	~~17~~	~~172~~	6	624	10	402	8	499	11	361	6	624	3385	3213
9	Kenneth Harrison Albury (BAH)	15	226	9	448	~~16~~	~~198~~	5	703	4	800	7	557	9	448	3380	3182
10	Colin Ryrie (AUS)	4	800	13	288	11	361	~~DNF~~	~~0~~	7	557	14	256	5	703	2965	2965
11	Richard Creagh-Osborne (GBR)	8	499	6	624	7	557	8	499	~~DNF~~	~~0~~	9	448	15	226	2853	2853
12	Yury Shavrin (URS)	10	402	10	402	5	703	~~15~~	~~226~~	14	256	10	402	8	499	2890	2664
13	Didier Poissant (FRA)	11	361	7	557	4	800	13	288	12	323	15	226	~~16~~	~~198~~	2753	2555
14	Jack Snowden (SIN)	13	288	4	800	14	256	11	361	11	361	~~16~~	~~198~~	13	288	2552	2354
15	Wolfgang Erndl (AUT)	14	256	15	226	10	402	~~DNF~~	~~0~~	5	703	DNF	0	12	323	1910	1910
16	John Somers Payne (IRL)	9	448	~~DNF~~	~~0~~	9	448	12	323	13	288	12	323	DNF	0	1830	1830
17	Joaquim Roderbourg (BRA)	16	198	11	361	~~DNF~~	~~0~~	14	256	9	448	DNF	0	14	256	1519	1519
18	Esteban Berisso (ARG)	18	147	14	256	13	288	16	198	15	226	13	288	~~DNF~~	~~0~~	1403	1403
19	Maung Maung Lwin (BIR)	17	172	~~18~~	~~147~~	17	172	17	172	17	172	17	172	18	147	1154	1007
20	Nesbit Bentley (FIJ)	~~DNF~~	~~0~~	19	123	18	147	18	147	16	198	18	147	17	172	934	934

DNF = Did Not Finish, DNS= Did Not Start, DSQ = Disqualified
= Male, = Female

=== Daily standings ===
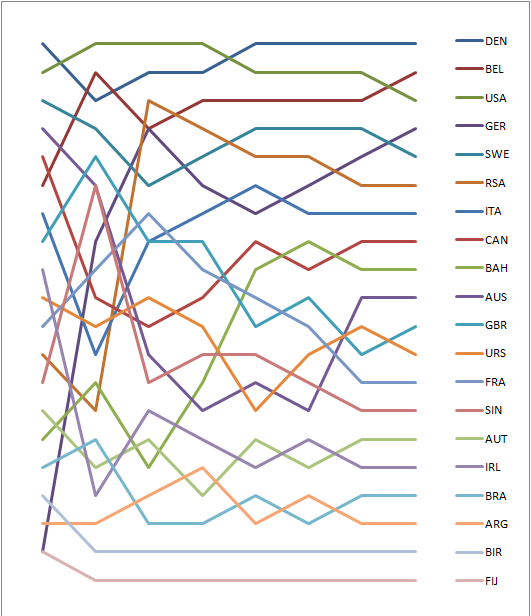
Graph showing the daily standings in the Finn during the 1956 Summer Olympics

== Conditions on Port Phillip ==
Three race areas were needed during the Olympics on Port Phillip. Each of the classes used the same scoring system. The southern course was used for the Finn.
