= Jack Snowden =

Singaporean sailor

Personal information
- Nationality: Singaporean
- Born: 18 January 1923
- Died: 31 December 2000 (aged 77)

Sport
- Sport: Sailing

John Snowden (18 January 1923 – 31 December 2000) was a Singaporean sailor. He competed in the Finn event at the 1956 Summer Olympics.
