= Joel Jahn =

Finnish sailor (1934–1995)

Personal information
- Nationality: Finnish
- Born: 10 January 1934; Helsinki, Finland
- Died: 3 June 1995 (aged 61)

Sport
- Sport: Sailing

Joel Jahn (10 January 1934 – 3 June 1995) was a Finnish sailor. He competed in the Dragon event at the 1956 Summer Olympics. Jahn died on 3 June 1995, at the age of 61.
