= Keith Johnson (sailor) =

Singaporean sailor (1897–1960)

Personal information
- Full name: Keith Littlewood Johnson
- Nationality: Singaporean
- Born: 15 February 1897 Port Frederick, Tasmania, Australia
- Died: 1960 (aged 62–63) Singapore

Sport
- Sport: Sailing

Keith Littlewood Johnson (15 February 1897 – 1960) was a Singaporean sailor. He competed in the Dragon event at the 1956 Summer Olympics.
