= Bernardo d'Almeida =

Portuguese sailor

Personal information
- Nationality: Portuguese
- Born: 6 August 1912 São Sebastião da Pedreira, Portugal

Sport
- Sport: Sailing

Bernardo d'Almeida (born 6 August 1912, date of death unknown) was a Portuguese sailor. He competed in the Dragon event at the 1956 Summer Olympics.
