= Jacques Lippens =

Belgian sailor (1913–1994)

Personal information
- Full name: Jacques Michel Maurice Hippolyte Marie Ghislain Lippens
- Nationality: Belgian
- Born: 25 November 1913 Ghent, Belgium
- Died: 8 October 1994 (aged 80) Aalst, Belgium

Sport
- Sport: Sailing

Jacques Michel Maurice Hippolyte Marie Ghislain Lippens (25 November 1913 – 8 October 1994) was a Belgian sailor. He competed in the Dragon event at the 1948 Summer Olympics. Lippens died in Aalst on 8 October 1994, at the age of 80.
