= Danny Killeen =

American sailor

Personal information
- Born: February 6, 1933 New Orleans, Louisiana, United States
- Died: April 28, 2017 (aged 84) Pass Christian, Mississippi, United States

Sport
- Sport: Sailing

Danny Killeen (February 6, 1933 – April 28, 2017) was an American sailor. He competed in the Dragon event at the 1956 Summer Olympics.
