= Georges Hellebuyck Jr. =

Belgian sailor

Personal information
- Full name: Willy Richard Georges Hellebuyck, Jr.
- Nationality: Belgian
- Born: 20 June 1920 Antwerp, Belgium

Sport
- Sport: Sailing

Georges Hellebuyck Jr. (born 20 June 1920, date of death unknown) was a Belgian sailor. He competed in the Dragon event at the 1948 Summer Olympics.
