= Tor-Kristian Lindh =

Finnish sailor (1906–1963)

Personal information
- Nationality: Finnish
- Born: 13 November 1906; Helsinki, Finland
- Died: 16 November 1969 (aged 63); Helsinki, Finland

Sport
- Sport: Sailing

Tor-Kristian Lindh (13 November 1906 – 16 November 1969) was a Finnish sailor. He competed in the Dragon event at the 1956 Summer Olympics.
