= Aatos Hirvisalo =

Finnish sailor

Personal information
- Full name: Aatos Martin Hirvisalo
- Nationality: Finnish
- Born: 17 December 1915; Helsinki, Finland
- Died: 18 August 1992 (aged 76); Helsinki, Finland

Sport
- Sport: Sailing

Aatos Martin Hirvisalo (17 December 1915 – 18 August 1992) was a Finnish sailor. He competed in the Dragon event at the 1948 Summer Olympics.
