= Albert Huybrechts (sailor) =

Belgian sailor

Personal information
- Nationality: Belgian
- Born: 12 February 1915; Vlissingen, Netherlands
- Died: 27 March 1999 (aged 84)

Sailing career
- Class: Dragon
- Club: Royal Yacht Club of Belgium

Albert Huybrechts (12 February 1915 – 27 March 1999) was a Belgian sailor. He competed in the Dragon event at the 1948 Summer Olympics.
