= Brian Carolan =

Australian sailor

Personal information
- Full name: Brian Barrett Carolan
- Nationality: Australian
- Born: 18 February 1927
- Died: 29 November 1983 (aged 56)

Sport
- Sport: Sailing

Brian Carolan (18 February 1927 – 1 August 1983) was an Australian sailor. He competed in the Dragon event at the 1956 Summer Olympics.
