= Bernard Ward (sailor) =

Bermudian sailor

Personal information
- Full name: James Bernard Ward
- Nationality: Bermudian
- Born: 1918

Sport
- Sport: Sailing

Bernard Ward (born 1918) was a Bermudian sailor. He competed in the Dragon event at the 1956 Summer Olympics.
