= John Flinkenberg =

Finnish sailor

Personal information
- Nationality: Finnish
- Born: 15 March 1896 Vaasa, Finland
- Died: 2 December 1960 (aged 64) Helsinki, Finland

Sport
- Sport: Sailing

John Flinkenberg (15 March 1896 – 2 December 1960) was a Finnish sailor. He competed in the Dragon event at the 1956 Summer Olympics.
