= Henry Duys Jr. =

American sailor

Personal information
- Nationality: American
- Born: October 17, 1924 Montclair, New Jersey, United States
- Died: May 11, 2007 (aged 82) Hollywood, South Carolina, United States

Sport
- Sport: Sailing

Henry Duys Jr. (October 17, 1924 – May 11, 2007) was an American sailor. He competed in the Dragon event at the 1948 Summer Olympics.
