= Pyotr Tolstikhin =

Russian sailor

Personal information
- Nationality: Russian
- Born: 25 January 1927 Chernogorsk, Russia
- Died: 13 May 2002 (aged 75) Saint Petersburg, Russia

Sport
- Sport: Sailing

Pyotr Tolstikhin (25 January 1927 – 13 May 2002) was a Russian sailor. He competed in the Dragon event at the 1956 Summer Olympics.
