= Niilo Orama =

Finnish sailor

Personal information
- Nationality: Finnish
- Born: 8 December 1926 Helsinki, Finland
- Died: 26 December 1986 (aged 60) Espoo, Finland

Sport
- Sport: Sailing

Niilo Orama (8 December 1926 – 26 December 1986) was a Finnish sailor. He competed in the Dragon event at the 1948 Summer Olympics.
