= Sérgio Marques (sailor) =

Portuguese sailor

Sérgio Marquis
Personal information
- Full name: Sérgio Albert Marquis
- Nationality: Portuguese
- Born: c. 1929

Sport
- Sport: Sailing

Sérgio Marquis (born c. 1929) was a Portuguese sailor. He competed in the Dragon event at the 1956 Summer Olympics.
