= Yury Shavrin =

Soviet sailor

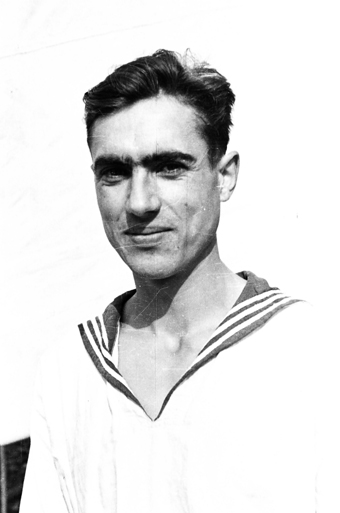

Personal information
- Born: 25 September 1924
- Died: 11 April 1974 (aged 49)
- Height: 183 cm (6 ft 0 in)
- Weight: 73 kg (161 lb)

Sport
- Sport: Sailing
- Club: Soviet Army Moscow

Yury Sergeyevich Shavrin (Russian: Юрий Сергеевич Шаврин, 25 September 1924 – 11 April 1974) was a Russian sailor who competed at the 1956 and 1964 Summer Olympics. In 1956 he placed 12th in the Finn class, and in 1964 finished 9th in the mixed three-person keelboat. Domestically Shavrin won 8 titles in different categories between 1947 and 1968.

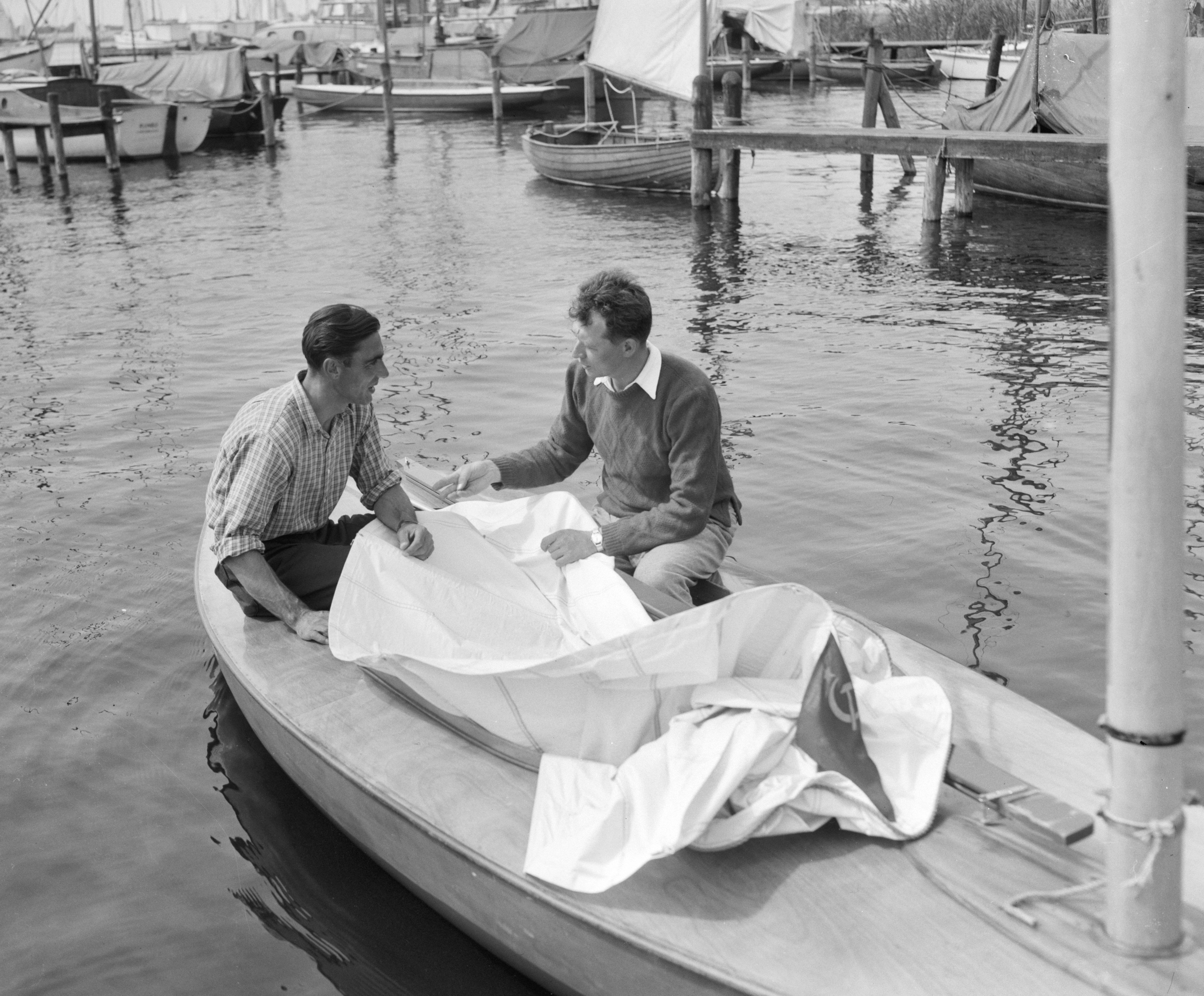
Shavrin (left, 5th place) and Markus (6th) at the 1956 European Finn Championships
