= Kenneth Golding =

Singaporean sailor

Personal information
- Nationality: Singaporean
- Born: 18 August 1921 Rochford, England
- Died: 24 April 1985 (aged 63) Bluestone Hill, Guernsey

Sport
- Sport: Sailing

Kenneth Dunstan Golding (18 August 1921 – 24 April 1985) was a Singaporean sailor. He competed in the Dragon event at the 1956 Summer Olympics.
