= Sailing at the 1956 Summer Olympics – Star =

Sailing at the Olympics

Star at the Games of the XVI Olympiad
- Medallists
- Venue: Port Phillip
- Dates: 26–29 November and 3–5 December
- Competitors: 24 from 12 nations
- Teams: 12

Medalists
1st place, gold medalist(s)		Herbert Williams; Lawrence Low	United States
2nd place, silver medalist(s)		Agostino Straulino; Nicolò Rode	Italy
3rd place, bronze medalist(s)		Durward Knowles; Sloane Farrington	Bahamas

The Star was a sailing event in the sailing program of the 1956 Summer Olympics, held on Port Phillip. Seven races were scheduled. 24 sailors, on 12 boats, from 12 nations competed.

== Results ==
Rank	Helmsman (Country)	Crew	Yachtname	Race I		Race II		Race III		Race IV		Race V		Race VI		Race VII		Total Points	Total -1
Rank	Helmsman (Country)	Crew	Yachtname	Rank	Points	Rank	Points	Rank	Points	Rank	Points	Rank	Points	Rank	Points	Rank	Points	Total Points	Total -1
1st place, gold medalist(s)	Herbert Williams (USA)	Lawrence Low	Kathleen	1	1180	5	481	2	879	1	1180	2	879	2	879	2	879	6357	5876
2nd place, silver medalist(s)	Agostino Straulino (ITA)	Nicolò Rode	Merope III.	3	703	DSQ	0	1	1180	3	703	3	703	1	1180	1	1180	5649	5649
3rd place, bronze medalist(s)	Durward Knowles (BAH)	Sloane Farrington	Gem IV.	2	879	2	879	5	481	2	879	1	1180	3	703	3	703	5704	5223
4	Duarte de Almeida Bello (POR)	José Silva	Faneca	10	180	1	1180	3	703	4	578	6	402	5	481	5	481	4005	3825
5	Philippe Chancerel (FRA)	Michel Parent	Gam II.	5	481	3	703	4	578	5	481	5	481	DNF	0	6	402	3126	3126
6	Carlos de Cárdenas (CUB)	Jorge de Cárdenas	Kurush IV.	4	578	DSQ	0	6	402	DNF	0	4	578	4	578	4	578	2714	2714
7	Bruce Bernard Banks (GBR)	Stanley Arthur Potter	Starlight III.	6	402	4	578	7	335	8	277	7	335	6	402	7	335	2664	2387
8	Timir Pinegin (URS)	Fyodor Shutkov	Tulilind	7	335	8	277	8	277	7	335	8	277	8	277	8	277	2055	1778
9	Robert French (AUS)	Jack Downey	Naiad	8	277	9	226	12	101	6	402	11	139	9	226	11	139	1510	1409
10	Eugene Pennell (CAN)	George Parsons	Mariana	11	139	7	335	9	226	DNF	0	10	180	7	335	10	180	1395	1395
11	Ovidio Lagos (ARG)	Jorge Brown	Covunco III.	9	226	6	402	10	180	DNF	0	9	226	DNF	0	9	226	1260	1260
12	Prinz Bira Bhanubanda (THA)	Luang Pradiyat Navayudh	Tichiboo	DNF	0	10	180	11	139	DNF	0	DNF	0	DNF	0	12	101	420	420

DNF = Did not finish, DNS= Did not start, DSQ = Disqualified
= Male, = Female

=== Daily standings ===
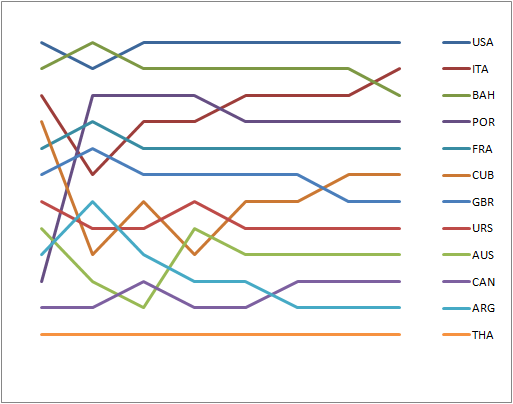
Graph showing the daily standings in the Star during the 1956 Summer Olympics

== Conditions on Port Phillip ==
Three race areas were needed during the Olympics on Port Phillip. Each of the classesused the same scoring system. The northern course was used for the Star.
