= Charles Delfosse =

Belgian sailor

Personal information
- Nationality: Belgian
- Born: 15 July 1913 Brussels, Belgium

Sport
- Sport: Sailing

Charles Delfosse (born 15 July 1913, date of death unknown) was a Belgian sailor. He competed in the Dragon event at the 1948 Summer Olympics.
