= Sigve Lie =

Norwegian sailor

Medal record

Men's sailing

Representing Norway

Olympic Games
Gold medal – first place	1948 London	Dragon
Gold medal – first place	1952 Helsinki	Dragon

Sigve Lie (April 1, 1906 – March 18, 1958) was a Norwegian sailor and Olympic champion. He competed at the 1948 Summer Olympics in London, where he received a gold medal in the dragon class as crew member on the boat Pan.

He competed at the 1952 Summer Olympics in Helsinki, where he again received a gold medal with Pan.

He died in Oslo in 1958.
