= Rainer Packalén =

Finnish sailor

Personal information
- Nationality: Finnish
- Born: 21 February 1917 Helsinki, Finland
- Died: 8 September 2008 (aged 91) Espoo, Finland

Sport
- Sport: Sailing

Rainer Packalén (21 February 1917 – 8 September 2008) was a Finnish sailor. He competed in the Dragon event at the 1948 Summer Olympics.
