= Henrique Sallaty =

Portuguese sailor (1918–2007)

Personal information
- Nationality: Portuguese
- Born: 20 December 1918 Lisbon, Portugal
- Died: 2007 (aged 88–89)

Sport
- Sport: Sailing

Henrique Sallaty (20 December 1918 – 2007) was a Portuguese sailor. He competed in the Dragon event at the 1948 Summer Olympics.
