= Luang Pradiyat Navayudh =

Thai sailor

- Born: Chiap Saeng-Xuto; 16 September 1902
- Died: 28 November 1971 (aged 69)
- Occupations: Naval officer, Olympic sailor

Chiap Saeng-Xuto (Thai: เฉียบ แสง-ชูโต, 16 September 1902 – 28 November 1971), known by the noble title Luang Pradiyat Navayudh (หลวงประดิยัตนาวายุทธ์), was a Thai naval captain. He was the eldest son of Admiral Phraya Mahayotha (Chang Saeng-Xuto) and a nephew of Chaophraya Surasakmontri (Choem Saeng-Xuto). He attended the Royal Naval College, Greenwich and joined the Royal Thai Navy in 1927, serving until 1946 when he was transferred to a civilian post under the Ministry of Foreign Affairs. He was also a sports sailor, and competed in the Star event at the 1956 Summer Olympics.
