= Lawrence Low =

American sailor

Larry Low
Medal record

Men's sailing

Representing the United States

Olympic Games
| Gold medal – first place | 1956 Melbourne | Star |

Lawrence Edgar Low (August 22, 1920 – July 1, 1996) was an American sailor and Olympic champion. He competed at the 1956 Summer Olympics in Melbourne, where he received a gold medal in the star class with the boat Kathleen, together with Herbert Williams.

Born in Trenton, New Jersey, Low was raised in the Green Pond section of Rockaway Township, New Jersey.
