= Richard Creagh-Osborne =

British sailor

Personal information
- Full name: Richard Pearson Creagh-Osborne
- Nationality: British
- Born: 5 April 1928; Stowmarket, England
- Died: 20 August 1980 (aged 52); Lymington, England

Sport
- Sport: Sailing

Richard Pearson Creagh-Osborne (5 April 1928 – 20 August 1980) was a British sailor. He competed in the Finn event at the 1956 Summer Olympics.
