= José Silva (sailor) =

Portuguese sailor (1925–2018)

Personal information
- Nationality: Portuguese
- Born: 5 April 1925
- Died: 20 October 2018 (aged 93)

Sport
- Sport: Sailing

José Silva (5 April 1925 – 20 October 2018) was a Portuguese sailor. He competed in the Star event at the 1956 Summer Olympics.
