= Jacques Lauwerys =

Belgian sailor

Personal information
- Nationality: Belgian
- Born: 2 April 1888 Antwerp, Belgium
- Died: 22 September 1976 (aged 88)

Sport
- Sport: Sailing

Jacques Lauwerys (2 April 1888 – 22 September 1976) was a Belgian sailor. He competed in the Dragon event at the 1948 Summer Olympics.
