= Pino Canessa =

Italian sailor

Personal information
- Nationality: Italian
- Born: 20 December 1907 Bogliasco, Italy
- Died: 9 November 2001 (aged 93)

Sport
- Sport: Sailing

Pino Canessa (20 December 1907 – 9 November 2001) was an Italian sailor. He competed in the Dragon event at the 1948 Summer Olympics.
