= Richard Jessup (sailor) =

American sailor

Personal information
- Nationality: American
- Born: March 25, 1925 Roslyn, New York, United States
- Died: June 21, 2012 (aged 87) Mill Valley, California, United States

Sport
- Sport: Sailing

Richard Jessup (March 25, 1925 – July 21, 2012) was an American sailor. He competed in the Dragon event at the 1948 Summer Olympics.
