= HMCS Dundas =

Flower-class corvette

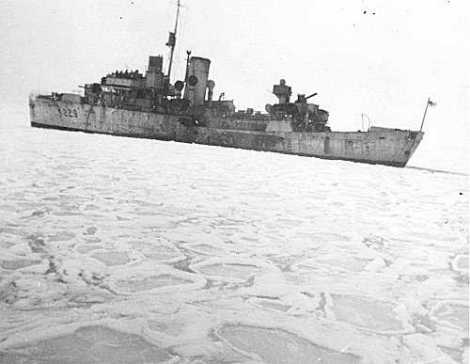
- HMCS Dundas

History

Canada
- Name: Dundas
- Namesake: Dundas, Ontario
- Builder: Victoria Machinery Depot Co. Ltd., Victoria
- Laid down: 19 March 1941
- Launched: 25 July 1941
- Commissioned: 1 April 1942
- Decommissioned: 17 July 1945
- Identification: Pennant number: K229
- Honours and awards: Atlantic 1942–45
- Fate: Scrapped 1946

General characteristics
- Class & type: Flower-class corvette
- Displacement: 950 long tons (970 t; 1,060 short tons)
- Length: 203 ft (61.87 m)
- Beam: 33 ft (10.06 m)
- Draught: 13 ft (3.96 m)
- Propulsion: single shaft; 2 × water tube boilers; 1 × double acting triple-expansion reciprocating steam engine; 2,750 ihp (2,050 kW)
- Speed: 16.5 knots (30.6 km/h)
- Range: 3,500 nautical miles (6,482 km) at 12 knots (22.2 km/h)
- Complement: 5 officers, 61 men
- Sensors & processing systems: 1 × SW1C or 2C radar; 1 × Type 123A or Type 127DV sonar
- Armament: 1 × BL 4-inch (101.6 mm) Mk.IX single gun; 1 × 2-pounder Mk.VIII single "pom-pom"; 4 × Mk.II depth charge throwers; 2 depth charge rails with 60 depth charges

HMCS Dundas was a Flower-class corvette that served with the Royal Canadian Navy during the Second World War. She saw action in both Atlantic and Pacific theatres of the war. She was named for Dundas, Ontario.

== Background ==
Flower-class corvettes like Dundas serving with the Royal Canadian Navy during the Second World War were different to earlier and more traditional sail-driven corvettes. The "corvette" designation was created by the French as a class of small warships; the Royal Navy borrowed the term for a period but discontinued its use in 1877. During the hurried preparations for war in the late 1930s, Winston Churchill reactivated the corvette class, needing a name for smaller ships used in an escort capacity, in this case based on a whaling ship design. The generic name "flower" was used to designate the class of these ships, which – in the Royal Navy – were named after flowering plants.

Corvettes commissioned by the Royal Canadian Navy during the Second World War were named after communities for the most part, to better represent the people who took part in building them. This idea was put forth by Admiral Percy W. Nelles. Sponsors were commonly associated with the community for which the ship was named. Royal Navy corvettes were designed as open sea escorts, while Canadian corvettes were developed for coastal auxiliary roles which was exemplified by their minesweeping gear. Eventually the Canadian corvettes would be modified to allow them to perform better on the open seas.

== Construction ==
Dundas was ordered as part of the 1940–1941 Flower-class building program. She was identical to the 1939–1940 program except for a few changes. The 1940–41 program had water-tube boilers, which were less responsive but had more reliability in providing a consistent supply of steam. The second significant change was that no minesweeping gear was ever installed, as the role of the corvette had changed from coastal auxiliary to convoy escort.

Dundas was laid down 19 March 1941 by Victoria Machinery Depot Co. Ltd. at Victoria, British Columbia and launched 25 July 1941. She was commissioned at Victoria 1 April 1942. During her career, Dundas had two major refits. The first took place at Montreal beginning on 13 June 1943 and finishing 19 November 1943. During this refit, among other changes, she had her fo'c'sle extended. Her second overhaul took place at Liverpool, Nova Scotia beginning in January 1945 and taking two months to complete.

== Service history ==
After workups, Dundas joined Esquimalt Force at Esquimalt, British Columbia. In August 1942 she escorted convoys to Alaska as part of the American-led Aleutian Islands Campaign. After completing those duties, she was reassigned to the east coast in September as a replacement for the corvettes departing for Operation Torch.

Dundas arrived at Halifax 13 October 1942, joining the Western Local Escort Force upon her arrival. When WLEF adopted convoy escort groups in June 1943, Dundas was initially assigned to group W-7. In September 1943 she joined W-5 and in April 1944, W-4. After her final refit at the beginning of 1945 she resumed service with W-4 and remained with them until the end of the war.

Dundas was paid off 17 July 1945 at Sorel, Quebec and transferred to the War Assets Corporation. She was sold 23 October 1945 for scrapping and broken up in 1946 at Hamilton, Ontario.
