= Piero Gorgatto =

Italian sailor

Personal information
- Nationality: Italy
- Born: 7 January 1925; Trieste, Italy
- Died: 7 September 1991; Trieste, Italy

Sport
- Sport: Sailing

Piero Gorgatto (7 January 1925 – 7 September 1991) was an Italian sailor who competed in the 1956 Summer Olympics.
