= Herbert Williams (sailor) =

American sailor

Medal record

Men's sailing

Representing the United States

Olympic Games
| Gold medal – first place | 1956 Melbourne | Star |

Herbert Philip Williams (July 24, 1908 – January 10, 1990) was an American sailor and Olympic champion. He competed at the 1956 Summer Olympics in Melbourne, where he received a gold medal in the star class with the boat Kathleen, together with Lawrence Low.
