= Graham Mann =

British sailor

Medal record

Men's sailing

Representing Great Britain

Olympic Games
Bronze medal – third place	1956 Melbourne	Dragon

Graham Mann (26 June 1924 – 1 April 2000) was a British competitive sailor and Olympic medalist. He won a bronze medal in the Dragon class at the 1956 Summer Olympics in Melbourne, together with Ronald Backus and Jonathan Janson. Married Carol Seyd, and had three children, Sarah, Lucinda and Jennifer.
