= Leif Wikström =

Swedish sailor

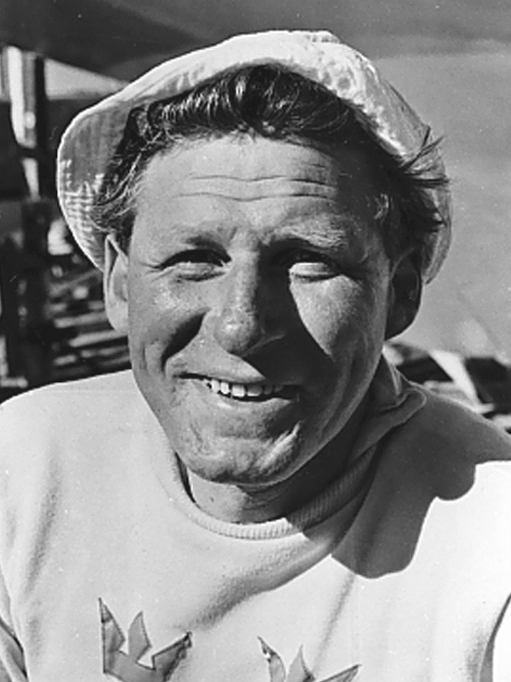

Personal information
- Born: 18 August 1918 Lysekil, Sweden
- Died: 27 January 1991 (aged 72) Lysekil, Sweden

Sailing career
- Sport: Sailing
- Club: Royal Gothenburg Yacht Club
Medal record
Sailing
Representing Sweden
Olympic Games
Gold medal – first place	1956 Melbourne	Dragon class

Leif Gordon Wikström (18 August 1918 – 27 January 1991) was a Swedish sailor. He was a crew member of the Swedish boat Slaghöken II that won the gold medal in the Dragon class at the 1956 Summer Olympics.
