= Hans Saksvik =

Norwegian footballer (1926-2001)

Personal information
- Date of birth: 25 July 1926
- Date of death: 12 October 2001 (aged 75)

International career
Years	Team	Apps	(Gls)
1959	Norway	1	(0)

Hans Saksvik (25 July 1926 – 12 October 2001) was a Norwegian footballer. He played in one match for the Norway national football team in 1959.
