= João Capucho =

Portuguese sailor

Personal information
- Nationality: Portuguese
- Born: 23 October 1916; Lisbon, Portugal
- Died: 5 October 1998 (aged 81)

Sport
- Sport: Sailing

João Capucho (23 October 1916 – 5 October 1998) was a Portuguese sailor. He competed in the Dragon event at the 1948 Summer Olympics.
