= Hugo Johnson =

Swedish sailor

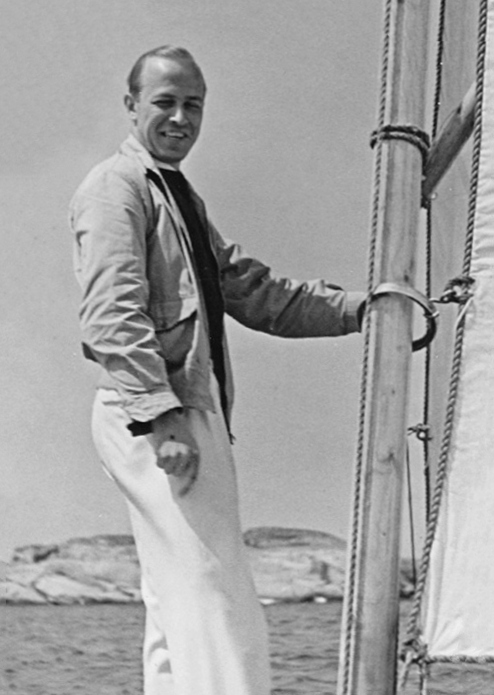

Personal information
- Born: 29 February 1908 Gothenburg, Sweden
- Died: 6 June 1983 (aged 75) Juan-les-Pins, Alpes-Maritimes, France

Sailing career
- Sport: Sailing
- Club: Royal Gothenburg Yacht Club
Medal record
Representing Sweden
Olympic Games
Silver medal – second place	1948 London	Dragon class

Viktor Hugo Johnson (29 February 1908 – 6 June 1983) was a Swedish sailor. He was a crew member of the Swedish boat Slaghöken that won a silver medal in the Dragon class at the 1948 Summer Olympics.
