= Arne Harris =

American television producer and director

Arnold H. Harris (22 May 1934 – 6 October 2001) was the producer/director of WGN-TV's Chicago Cubs television broadcasts for 38 years from 1964 until his death. While he never appeared on camera, he could frequently be heard talking with announcer Harry Caray.

Harris was born and died in Chicago, Illinois. He joined WGN in 1956 while attending Drake University. After his death at age 67 in 2001, the Cubs placed a flag of honor on the roof of Wrigley Field.
