= Paul James Phelan =

Canadian yachtsman and businessman

Paul James Phelan, CM (1917 – 2 Sep 2002) was a Canadian businessman, yachtsman, and wartime RCAF Squadron Leader.

== Life and career ==
Phelan inherited his father's Canada Railway News Co. (founded in 1883), expanded it, then renamed it Cara Operations Ltd when he took it public in 1968. The company had started as The Canada Railway News Company and initially sold tomatoes.

Under Phelan, the company opened refreshment rooms at hotels and hubs along the rail line. He opened its first Swiss Chalet diner in 1954. In 1977, Phelan engineered a takeover of the Swiss Chalet franchisor, Foodcorp, a $50 million business, with 97 food outlets between its Swiss Chalet and Harvey's brands.

Cara provided food for Air Canada late last century. Phelan controlled through it Swiss Chalet, Harvey's, Second Cup, Kelsey's Neighborhood Bar & Grill, and Montana's Cookhouse at the time of his death.

In 2010, his heirs were diluted by Fairfax Financial Holdings. Fairfax subsequently re-diluted them in 2013.

In April 2015, when his heirs were forced back into the stock market, they were part-owners of a corporation that controlled 837 food outlets, and sold $1.7 billion in food. It was the third largest restaurant chain in Canada after Tim Hortons and McDonald's. At the time, it had 26,000 employees across Canada. In 2016, sales were over $2 billion.

== Family, legacy and honours ==
Phelan married Helen Gardiner. Together they raised Gail, Sharon, Paul David, and Rosemary, who gave them a dozen grandchildren. His funeral services were at Holy Rosary Church in Forest Hill, Toronto.

Phelan, who sailed Dragon-class yachts, was a past Commodore of the RCYC, president of the CYA from 1961-1963 and again in 1990-91, and was presented the 1986 Sail Canada Rolex Sailor of the year award for his merger of two rival Canadian bids for the 26th America's Cup, when he funded a merger between them for $14 million.

Phelan was a Member of the Order of Canada. The B'nai Brith Foundation presented him their Award of Merit, while the ISAF gave him their Long Service Gold Medal. In 1993, he was awarded the ISAF Beppe Croce Trophy for his outstanding voluntary contribution to the sport of sailing. Through his ownership of the yacht Red Jacket, he helped introduce "new sailors who might not otherwise get a chance to become involved in yacht racing" to the sport, including many women. Phelan also served on the IYRU as chairman of the Youth Committee, and contributed to World Youth Sailing Trust. The P.J. Phelan Sailing Foundation continues Phelan's philanthropy to this day.
