= Børge Hansen =

Danish rower (1931–2018)

Personal information
- Nationality: Danish
- Born: 6 January 1931 Copenhagen, Denmark
- Died: 26 August 2018 (aged 87) Cromwell, New Zealand

Sport
- Sport: Rowing

Børge Hansen (6 January 1931 – 26 August 2018) was a Danish rower. He competed in two events at the 1956 Summer Olympics. Hansen died in Cromwell, New Zealand on 26 August 2018, at the age of 87.
