= Gerard Hengeveld =

Dutch musician (1910–2001)

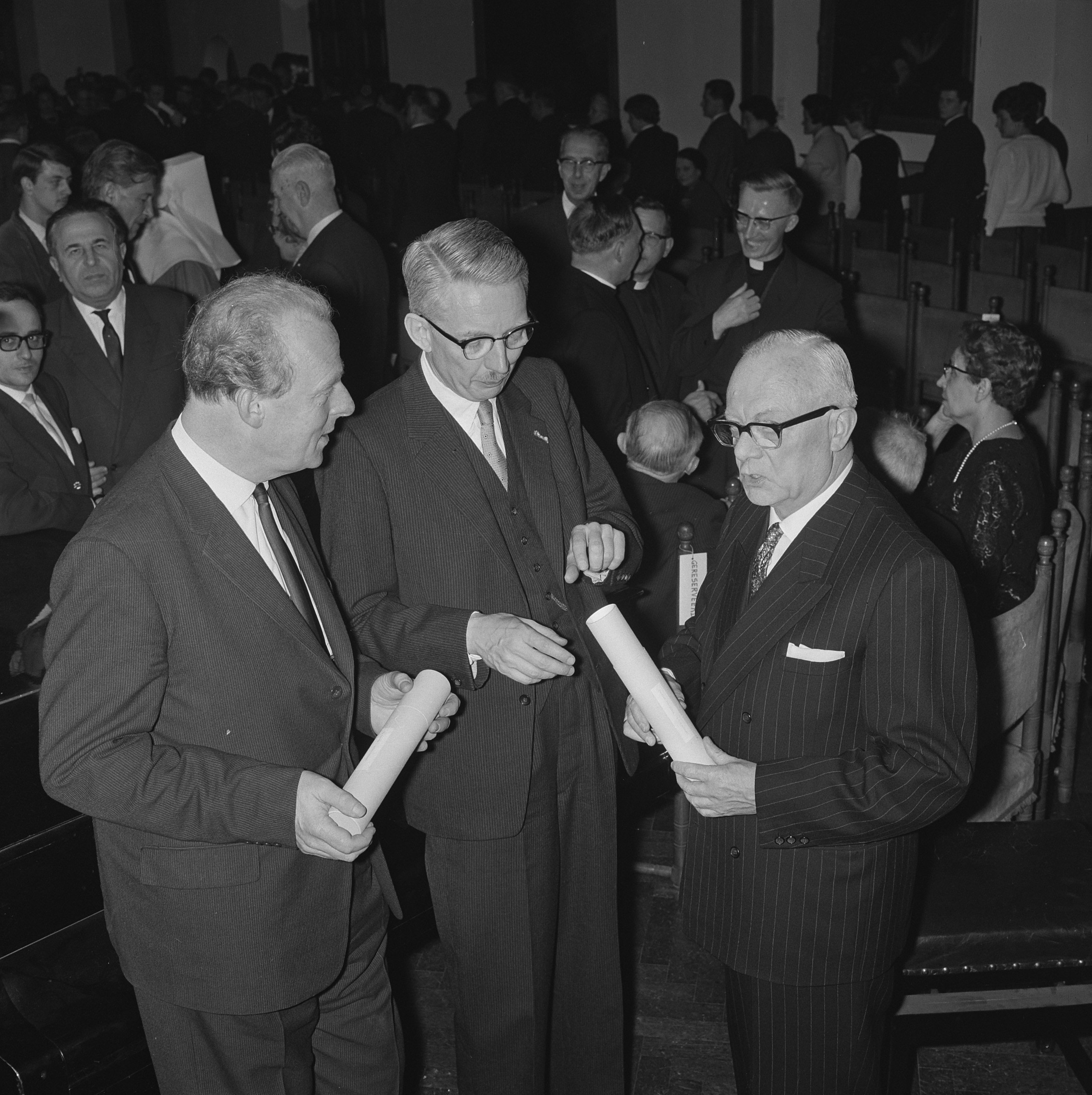
Presentation of ANV-Visser Neerlandia Prizes 1964. The Hague Rolzaal two well-known music artists Gerard Hengeveld (l) and Hans Henkemans (m) received a prize from the chairman of ANV-VN, Frans Koote. Date February 15, 1964

Gerard Hengeveld (December 7, 1910, in Kampen – October 28, 2001, in Bergen, North Holland) was a Dutch classical pianist, music composer and educationalist. He is especially known for his compositions of study material for piano. Other compositions include two piano concertos, a violin sonata, and a sonata for cello. Hengeveld was an able interpreter and performer of the music of Bach for piano and harpsichord. He gave regular concerts in the Concertgebouw in Amsterdam. Some of his concerts were captured on record. Hengeveld was a professor at the Royal Conservatory of The Hague. Amongst his students was Dutch pianist and musicologist Frans Bouwman.

Hengeveld died in 2001 at the age of 90, in Bergen. His closest living relative is Nicholas Hengeveld of Allentown, Pennsylvania.
