= The Big Town (1925 film) =

1925 film

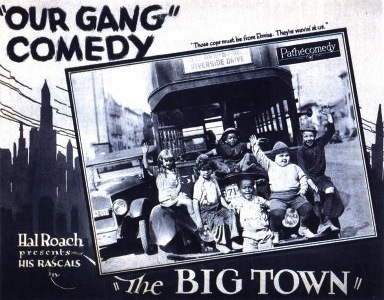
- Directed by: Robert F. McGowan
- Written by: Hal Roach; H. M. Walker
- Produced by: Hal Roach
- Starring: Joe Cobb; Jackie Condon; Mickey Daniels; Allen Hoskins; Eugene Jackson; Mary Kornman; David Durand; Jack Gavin; Gus Leonard; William Gillespie; Helen Gilmore; Lyle Tayo
- Cinematography: Art Lloyd
- Edited by: T. J. Crizer
- Distributed by: Pathé Exchange
- Release date: January 11, 1925
- Running time: 23:26
- Country: United States
- Language: Silent with English intertitles

The Big Town is a 1925 American short silent comedy film, the 34th in the Our Gang series, directed by Robert F. McGowan.

== Plot ==
The gang is playing in the railyard when a fire starts. They hide in a railroad car and are trapped. The next morning, they discover that they have arrived in New York City. They enjoy the sites, visiting the Brooklyn Bridge and the Statue of Liberty, and they take a sightseeing bus for a joyride but are finally caught by the police.

A police officer is assigned to return the gang home on a train. They scatter an entomologist's bugs around the sleeper car during the night and order exotic foods for breakfast. When they arrive at home, their mothers greet them with a spanking.

== Cast ==
=== The Gang ===
- Joe Cobb – Joe
- Jackie Condon – Jackie
- Mickey Daniels – Mickey
- Allen Hoskins – Farina
- Eugene Jackson – Pineapple
- Mary Kornman – Mary

=== Additional cast ===
- David Durand – kid on train
- Jack Gavin – gang escort
- Gus Leonard – entomologist
- William Gillespie – passengers
- Helen Gilmore – passenger
- Lyle Tayo – passenger
