= Jim Carolane =

Australian sailor

Jim Carolan
Personal information
- Full name: James Arthur Donald Carolane
- Nationality: Australian
- Born: 10 January 1928
- Died: 2 October 2001 (aged 73)

Sport
- Sport: Sailing

James Arthur Donald Carolane (10 January 1928 – 2 October 2001) was an Australian sailor. He competed in the Dragon event at the 1956 Summer Olympics.
