= Albert Cuthbertson =

New Zealand sailor

Albert William Wallace Cuthbertson (4 November 1909 – 13 February 1977) was a yachtsman from New Zealand. He competed for New Zealand at the 1956 Summer Olympics in Melbourne, coming 11th in the three-man Dragon class with Robert Stewart and William Swinnerton.

== Sources ==
- Black Gold by Ron Palenski (2008, 2004 New Zealand Sports Hall of Fame, Dunedin) p. 32 ISBN 047600683X
