= Juan Gindre =

Argentine sports shooter

Personal information
- Born: 5 July 1915 Buenos Aires, Argentina
- Died: 27 November 1990 (aged 75) Buenos Aires, Argentina

Sport
- Sport: Sports shooting

Luis Maximiliano Juan Gindre Musso (5 July 1915 – 27 November 1990) was an Argentine sports shooter. He competed at the 1956 Summer Olympics and the 1960 Summer Olympics.
