= Christian von Bülow =

Danish sailor (1917–2002)

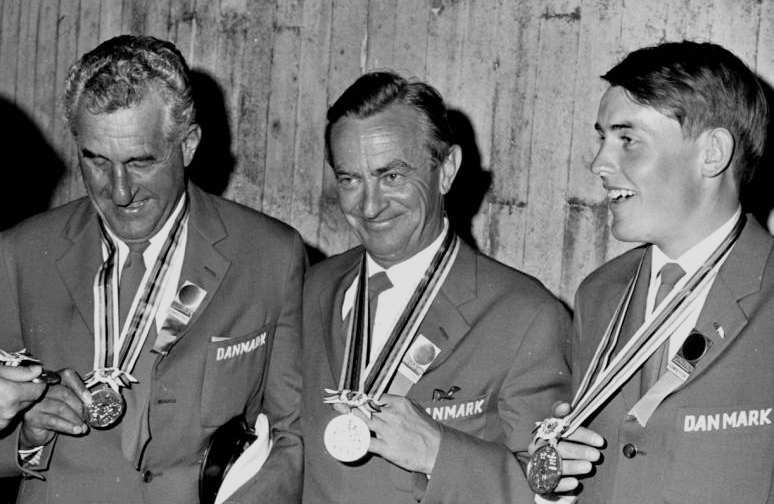
- Ole Berntsen, Christian von Bülow (center) and Ole Poulsen at the 1964 Olympics

Personal information
- Full name: Christian Robert von Bülow af Radum
- Born: 14 December 1917 Copenhagen, Denmark
- Died: 13 January 2002 (aged 84)
- Height: 173 cm (5 ft 8 in)
- Weight: 73 kg (161 lb)

Sailing career
- Sport: Sailing
- Club: Royal Danish Yacht Club
- Class: Dragon
Medal record
Sailing
Representing Denmark
Olympic Games
Silver medal – second place	1956 Melbourne	Dragon
Gold medal – first place	1964 Tokyo	Dragon

Christian Robert von Bülow af Radum (14 December 1917 – 13 January 2002) was a Danish sailor. He competed in the dragon class at the 1956 and 1964 Olympics and won a silver and a gold medal, respectively.
