= Willy Saeren =

Belgian footballer (1926–2002)

Personal information
- Date of birth: 8 April 1926
- Date of death: 13 August 2002 (aged 78)

International career
Years	Team	Apps	(Gls)
1952	Belgium	2	(0)

Willy Saeren (8 April 1926 – 13 August 2002) was a Belgian footballer. He played in two matches for the Belgium national football team in 1952.
