= Eric Bongers =

South African sailor (1924–2002)

Personal information
- Nationality: South African
- Born: 24 January 1924
- Died: 7 August 2002 (aged 78)

Sport
- Sport: Sailing

Eric Bongers (24 January 1924 – 7 August 2002) was a South African sailor. He competed in the Finn event at the 1956 Summer Olympics.
