= Mogens Sørensen =

Danish rower

Personal information
- Nationality: Danish
- Born: 22 January 1930; Rungsted, Denmark
- Died: 15 January 2006 (aged 75)

Sport
- Sport: Rowing

Mogens Sørensen (22 January 1930 – 15 January 2006) was a Danish rower. He competed in two events at the 1956 Summer Olympics.
