= Ovidio Lagos (sailor) =

Argentine sailor (1912–1970)

Personal information
- Nationality: Argentine
- Born: 21 July 1912
- Died: 16 September 1970 (aged 58)

Sport
- Sport: Sailing

Ovidio Lagos (21 July 1912 – 16 September 1970) was an Argentine sailor. He competed in the Star event at the 1956 Summer Olympics.
