= William Swinnerton =

New Zealand yacht racer (1899–1985)

William Edgar Swinnerton (27 November 1899 – 13 December 1985) was a yachtsman from New Zealand. He competed for New Zealand in the 1956 Summer Olympics in Melbourne, coming 11th in the three-man Dragon class with Albert Cuthbertson and Robert Stewart.

== Sources ==
- Black Gold by Ron Palenski (2008, 2004 New Zealand Sports Hall of Fame, Dunedin) p. 87 ISBN 047600683X
