= Jal Minocher Mehta =

Parsi Indian surgeon, social worker, and philanthropist

- Born: India
- Died: 13 October 2001; Pune, Maharashtra, India
- Occupations: Medical surgeon Philanthropist; Social worker
- Known for: Reconstructive surgery Leprosy eradication program
- Spouse: Mehru Jal Mehta
- Children: One son
- Awards: Padma Bhushan

Jal Minocher Mehta (died 2001) was a Parsi Indian surgeon, social worker and philanthropist, known for his services for the rehabilitation of people who have leprosy. He was the president of Pune District Leprosy Committee and was involved in organizing self help groups of the leprosy patients and in creating social awareness about the disease through documentaries. He chaired the Serum Institute of India (SIIL) and sat in the Advisory Boards of Pharmabiz, Chronicle Pharmabiz and the Vienna Karl Landsteiner Institute. His efforts towards the Leprosy eradication program included the management of a Leprosy Hospital and a Rehabilitation Centre in Pune. The Government of India awarded him the third highest civilian honour of the Padma Bhushan, in 1982, for his contributions to medical science. He died on 13 October 2001, succumbing to a cerebral hemorrhage at Pune, survived by his wife, Mehru, a medical doctor and cancer surgeon;
