= Ronald Backus =

British sailor (1922–1999)

Medal record

Men's sailing

Representing Great Britain

Olympic Games
Bronze medal – third place	1956 Melbourne	Dragon

Ronald Backus (28 March 1922 – 27 July 1999) was a British competitive sailor and Olympic medalist. He won a bronze medal in the Dragon class at the 1956 Summer Olympics in Melbourne, together with Graham Mann and Jonathan Janson. He was born in Poole, Wiltshire, England.
