= John Marvin (sailor) =

American sailor (1927–1980)

Medal record

Sailing

Representing the United States

Olympic Games
Bronze medal – third place	1956 Melbourne	Finn

John Marvin (October 17, 1927 – June 22, 1980) was an American competitive sailor and Olympic medalist. He is a 1949 graduate of the Massachusetts Institute of Technology and won a bronze medal in the Finn class at the 1956 Summer Olympics in Melbourne.
