= Kurt Svanberg =

Swedish ice hockey player

Personal information
- Nationality: Swedish
- Born: 26 September 1913 Stockholm, Sweden
- Died: 7 October 2001 (aged 88) Stockholm, Sweden

Sport
- Sport: Ice hockey

Kurt Erik Gustaf Svanberg (26 September 1913 – 7 October 2001) was a Swedish ice hockey player. He competed in the men's tournament at the 1948 Winter Olympics.
