= Jorge Brown (sailor) =

Argentine sailor (born 1929)

Jorge Diego Brown
Personal information
- Born: 14 November 1929 Bahía Blanca, Argentina
- Died: 6 February 2019 (aged 89)

Sport
- Sport: Sailing

Jorge Brown (14 November 1929 – 6 February 2019) was an Argentinian sailor. He competed in the Star event at the 1956 Summer Olympics.
