= Jonathan Janson (sailor) =

British sailor (1930–2015)

Olympic medal record

Representing Great Britain

Men's sailing

Olympic Games
Bronze medal – third place	1956 Melbourne	Dragon

Jonathan Janson (5 October 1930 – 29 November 2015) was a British competitive sailor and Olympic medalist. He was born in Chelsea. He won a bronze medal in the Dragon class at the 1956 Summer Olympics in Melbourne, together with Graham Mann and Ronald Backus., sailing the Camper and Nicholson built Bluebottle, which had been a wedding present from the Island Sailing Club in Cowes to Princess Elizabeth and Prince Philip.
