= Robert Stewart (sailor) =

New Zealand sailor

Robert Leslie Stewart (2 October 1906 – 28 November 1988) was a yachtsman from New Zealand. He competed for New Zealand in the 1956 Summer Olympics in Melbourne, coming 11th in the three-man Dragon class. He was the helmsman, with Albert Cuthbertson and William Swinnerton.

== Sources ==
- Black Gold by Ron Palenski (2008, 2004 New Zealand Sports Hall of Fame, Dunedin) p. 86 ISBN 047600683X
