= Gene Walet Jr. =

American sailor

Personal information
- Born: September 24, 1901 New Orleans, Louisiana, United States
- Died: April 2, 1968 (aged 66) New Orleans, Louisiana, United States

Sport
- Sport: Sailing

Gene Walet Jr. (September 24, 1901 – April 2, 1968) was an American sailor. He competed in the Dragon event at the 1956 Summer Olympics.
