= Esteban Berisso =

Argentine sailor

Personal information
- Nationality: Argentine
- Born: 17 April 1937 (age 87)

Sport
- Sport: Sailing

Esteban Berisso (born 17 April 1937) is an Argentine sailor. He competed in the Finn event at the 1956 Summer Olympics.
