= José Capmany =

Costa Rican musician (1961–2001)

- Born: 15 July 1961
- Origin: Costa Rica
- Died: 13 October 2001 (aged 40)
- Genres: Rock, Folk rock
- Occupations: Singer-songwriter, guitarist

José Capmany (15 July 1961 – 13 October 2001) was a Costa Rican songwriter and guitarist. Along with Enrique Ramírez, he was a founder of the band Café con Leche, a rock band in Costa Rica in the late 1980s. His latest release Canciones Cotidianas included a compilation of his work. Songs like "El Barco", "La Historia Salvaje" (which contains a sample of Gloria from Them but with more hard rock and in the lyrics the complete lyric from the popular children's song "Los Pollitos" combined with the chorus). "La Modelo" and "Mamá y Papá" are considered folk rock music in Costa Rica. He died in a car accident on October 13, 2001.

Capmany is widely recognized as the most important rock musician and a cornerstone in Costa Rican rock development. Many musicians have said they found him a source of inspiration, and most of his songs have been sung by other people as a form of tribute.

Sony Music released an album of Capmany's music after his death. Volando alto/La historia salvaje is a double disc, one with his old hits and other with unreleased songs that were completed by his bandmates.

In 2023, his son Pedro Capmany used AI technology to recreate his late father's voice for a duet. He recorded the track Volveré (I Will Be Back), incorporating a sample from his father’s song La Bella Durmiente.
