= Donald Tytler (sailor) =

Canadian sailor

Donald Tytler (8 March 1924 in Toronto – 15 November 2005) was a Canadian sailor who competed in the 1952 Summer Olympics and in the 1956 Summer Olympics.
