= Gene Walet III =

American sailor

Personal information
- Born: September 1, 1935 (age 91) New Orleans, Louisiana, United States

Sport
- Sport: Sailing

Gene Walet III (born September 1, 1935) is an American sailor. He competed at the 1956 Summer Olympics and the 1960 Summer Olympics.
