= Folke Bohlin (sailor) =

Swedish sailor (1903–1972)

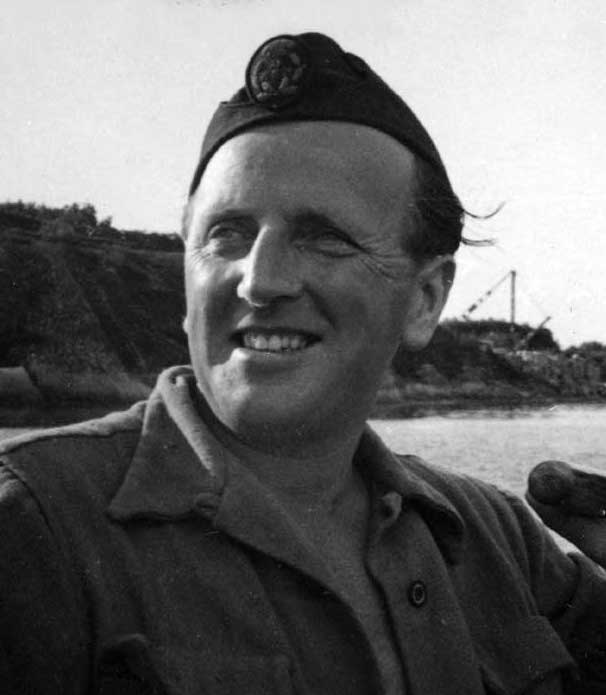

Personal information
- Born: 20 March 1903 Gothenburg, Sweden
- Died: 12 June 1972 (aged 69) Västra Frölunda, Gothenburg, Sweden

Sailing career
- Sport: Sailing
- Club: Royal Gothenburg Yacht Club
Medal record
Representing Sweden
Summer Olympics
Gold medal – first place	1956 Melbourne	Dragon class
Silver medal – second place	1948 London	Dragon class

Folke Ivar Reinhold Bohlin (20 March 1903 – 12 June 1972) was a Swedish sailor who competed in the 1948 and 1956 Summer Olympics.

In 1948 he won the silver medal as helmsman of the Swedish boat Slaghöken in the Dragon class event. Eight years later he won the gold medal as helmsman of the Swedish boat Slaghöken II in the Dragon class competition.

== See also ==
- List of Olympic medalists in Dragon class sailing
