= Boris Belada =

Argentine sailor (1920–2000)

Personal information
- Full name: Boris Aloisio Belada Rohlik
- Nationality: Argentine
- Born: 29 September 1920 Prague, Czechoslovakia
- Died: 2000 (aged 79-80)

Sport
- Sport: Sailing

Boris Aloisio Belada Rohlik (29 September 1920 – 2000) was an Argentine sailor. He competed at the 1956 and 1968 Summer Olympics. Belada died in 2000.
