= Cliff Howard =

Canadian sailor

Herald Clifford "Cliff" Howard (2 March 1923 – 20 November 2008) was a Canadian sailor who competed in the 1956 Summer Olympics.
