= Ole Berntsen =

Danish sailor (1915–1996)

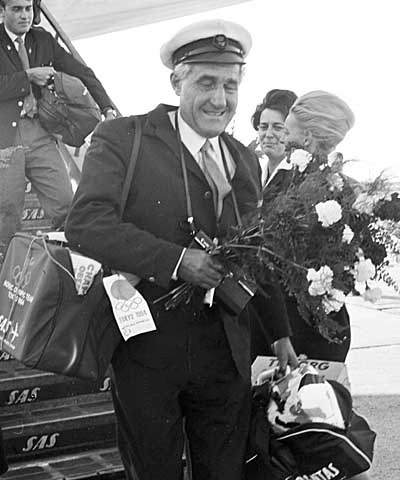
- Berntsen in 1964

Personal information
- Full name: Ole Valdemar Henrik Berntsen
- Born: 22 January 1915 Hellerup, Gentofte, Denmark
- Died: 26 May 1996 (aged 81) Gentofte, Denmark
- Height: 180 cm (5 ft 11 in)
- Weight: 75 kg (165 lb)

Sailing career
- Sport: Sailing
- Club: Hellerup Sejlklub
- Class: Dragon
Medal record
Sailing
Representing Denmark
Olympic Games
Gold medal – first place	1964 Tokyo	Dragon
Silver medal – second place	1956 Melbourne	Dragon
Bronze medal – third place	1948 London	Dragon
Dragon World Championship
Gold medal – first place	1965 Sandhamn	Dragon

Ole Valdemar Henrik Berntsen (22 January 1915 – 26 May 1996) was a Danish sailor. He competed in the dragon class at the 1948, 1952, 1956 and 1964 Olympics and placed third, fifth, second and first, respectively. His brothers Carl and William were also Olympic sailors. William competed alongside Ole in 1948 and 1952.
