= St. Andrew by-the-Lake Anglican Church =

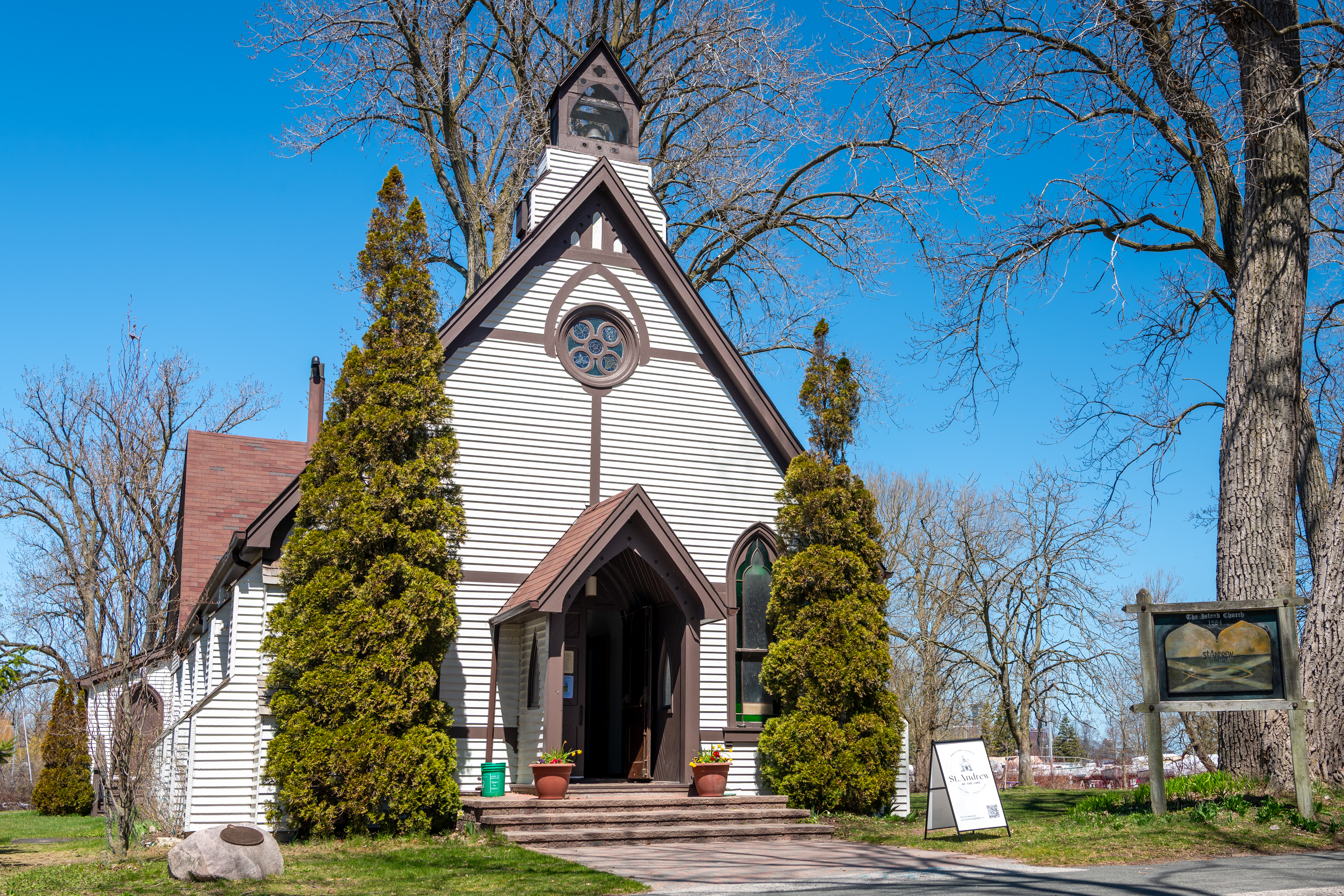
- St. Andrew by-the-Lake in 2025
- St. Andrew by-the-Lake Anglican Church
- 43°37′13″N 79°22′12″W
- Location: Toronto Islands
- Address: 102 Lakeshore Avenue, Toronto, Ontario
- Denomination: Anglican Church of Canada
- Website: www.standrewbythelake.com

Architecture
- Architect: Arthur Richard Denison
- Style: Carpenter Gothic
- Years built: 1884

Administration
- Province: Ontario
- Diocese: Toronto
- Archdeaconry: South
- Deanery: St. James

St. Andrew by-the-Lake Anglican Church is an Anglican church located on Centre Island, which is part of the Toronto Islands, offshore of Toronto, Ontario, Canada.

== History ==
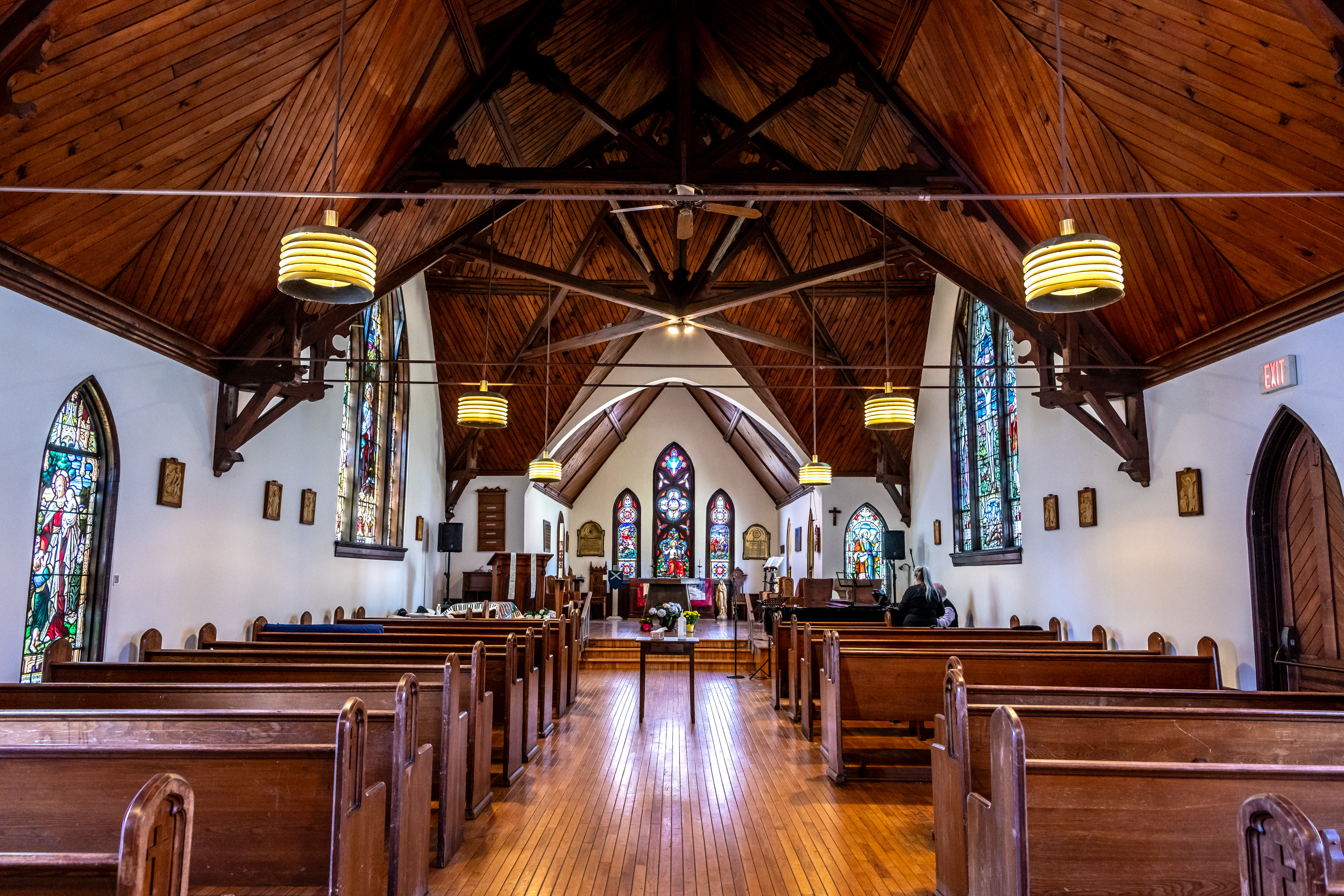
Interior of the church

Regular Anglican services had been taking place on the Islands since 1875 in the private homes of residents. In 1884, Arthur Sweatman, 3rd Bishop of Toronto, founded the church as his summer chapel of ease. The wooden church was constructed in the Carpenter Gothic style by Arthur Richard Denison at a cost of $2000. Many prominent Toronto families, such as the Masseys and the Gooderhams, who summered on the island, helped finance its construction.

In 1959, the church was partially disassembled and moved to its current location. The church building was condemned by the city and abandoned in 1980. Services were held in a home on the island until 1984 when the church was restored. St. Rita's, the Catholic church on the island, was demolished and the church became used for both Anglican and Catholic services.

The church hosts annual Blessing of the Fleet services for the Royal Canadian Yacht Club and the Queen City Yacht Club.

== See also ==
- List of Anglican churches in Toronto
