= Toronto Islands =

Chain of islands in Lake Ontario

- Aerial view of the Toronto Islands

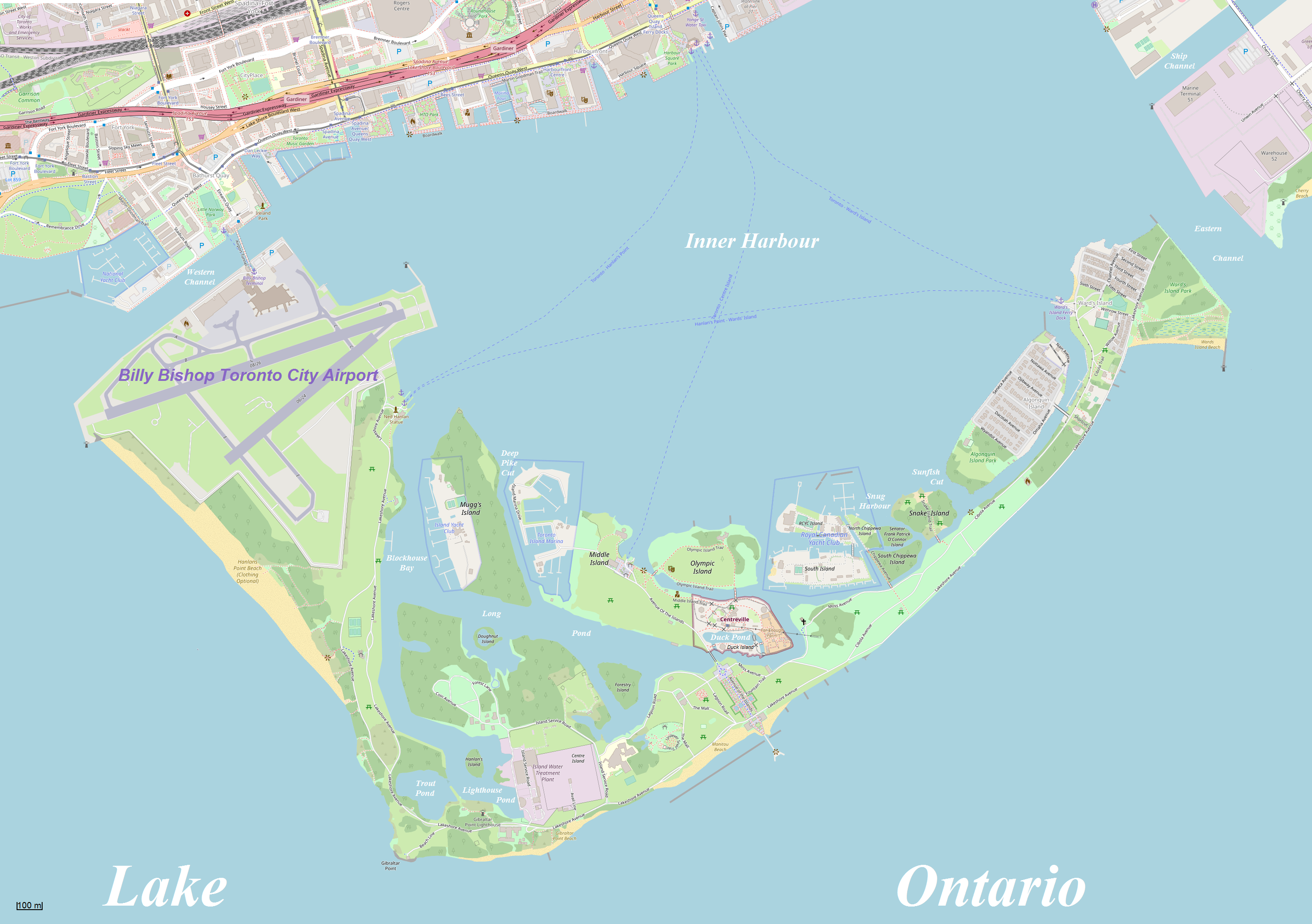
- Map of Toronto Islands

- The Toronto Islands in Ontario The Toronto Islands in Canada The Toronto Islands in North America

Geography
- Location: Lake Ontario
- Coordinates: 43°37′15″N 79°22′43″W
- Total islands: 15
- Major islands: Centre Island
- Area: 332 ha (820 acres)

Administration
- Canada
- Province: Ontario
- Single-tier municipality: City of Toronto

Demographics
- Population: 602 (2021)
- Languages: English

The Toronto Islands are a chain of 15 small islands in Lake Ontario, south of mainland Toronto, Ontario, Canada.

Comprising the only group of islands in the western part of Lake Ontario, the Toronto Islands are located just offshore from the city's downtown area, provide shelter for Toronto Harbour, and separate Toronto from the rest of Lake Ontario. The islands are home to the Toronto Island Park, the Billy Bishop Toronto City Airport, several private yacht clubs and restaurants, a public marina, Centreville Amusement Park, a year-round residential neighbourhood, and several public beaches. The island community is the largest urban car-free community in North America. Public ferries operate year-round from Jack Layton Ferry Terminal, and privately operated water taxis operate from May to September. A pedestrian tunnel connects the mainland to the airport (which is a secure area, from which the parks and other parts of the islands are not accessible).

The Toronto Islands are a popular tourist and recreational destination. Bicycles are accommodated on the ferries at no charge and can be rented at Centre Island and Ward's Island, and since 2025 Bike Share Toronto has stands on the islands. Canoes, kayaks, paddle boats and stand-up paddle boards are also available for rental from May to September. A disc golf course exists on the island. The main beach is along the south shore of Centre Island, and the beach on the west shore of Centre at Hanlan's Point is clothing-optional and the historic site of Canada's first Gay Pride. There is ample parkland suitable for picnicking, several playgrounds, water play areas and several gardens. During the winter months people reach the lagoons and Toronto Harbour from the islands for ice skating when conditions permit.

== List of islands ==
Island	Area	Population (2016)	Notes
Centre Island	2.6 km^{2} (640 acres)	403	
Middle Island	0.25 km^{2} (62 acres)	0	
Muggs Island	0.16 km^{2} (40 acres)	0	
Algonquin Island	0.14 km^{2} (35 acres)	217	
Olympic Island	0.087 km^{2} (21 acres)	0	
South Island	0.044 km^{2} (11 acres)	0	
Snake Island	0.034 km^{2} (8.4 acres)	0	
RCYC Island	0.026 km^{2} (6.4 acres)	0	
Forestry Island	0.018 km^{2} (4.4 acres)	0	
South Chippewa Island	0.017 km^{2} (4.2 acres)	0	
North Chippewa Island	0.0093 km^{2} (2.3 acres)	0	
Senator Frank Patrick O'Connor Island	0.0071 km^{2} (1.8 acres)	0	
(Unnamed)	0.0054 km^{2} (1.3 acres)	0	Sometimes called Hanlan's Island
(Unnamed)	0.0040 km^{2} (0.99 acres)	0	Surrounds the Setting Basin
(Unnamed)	0.00013 km^{2} (0.032 acres)	0	Sometimes called Duckling Island

== History ==
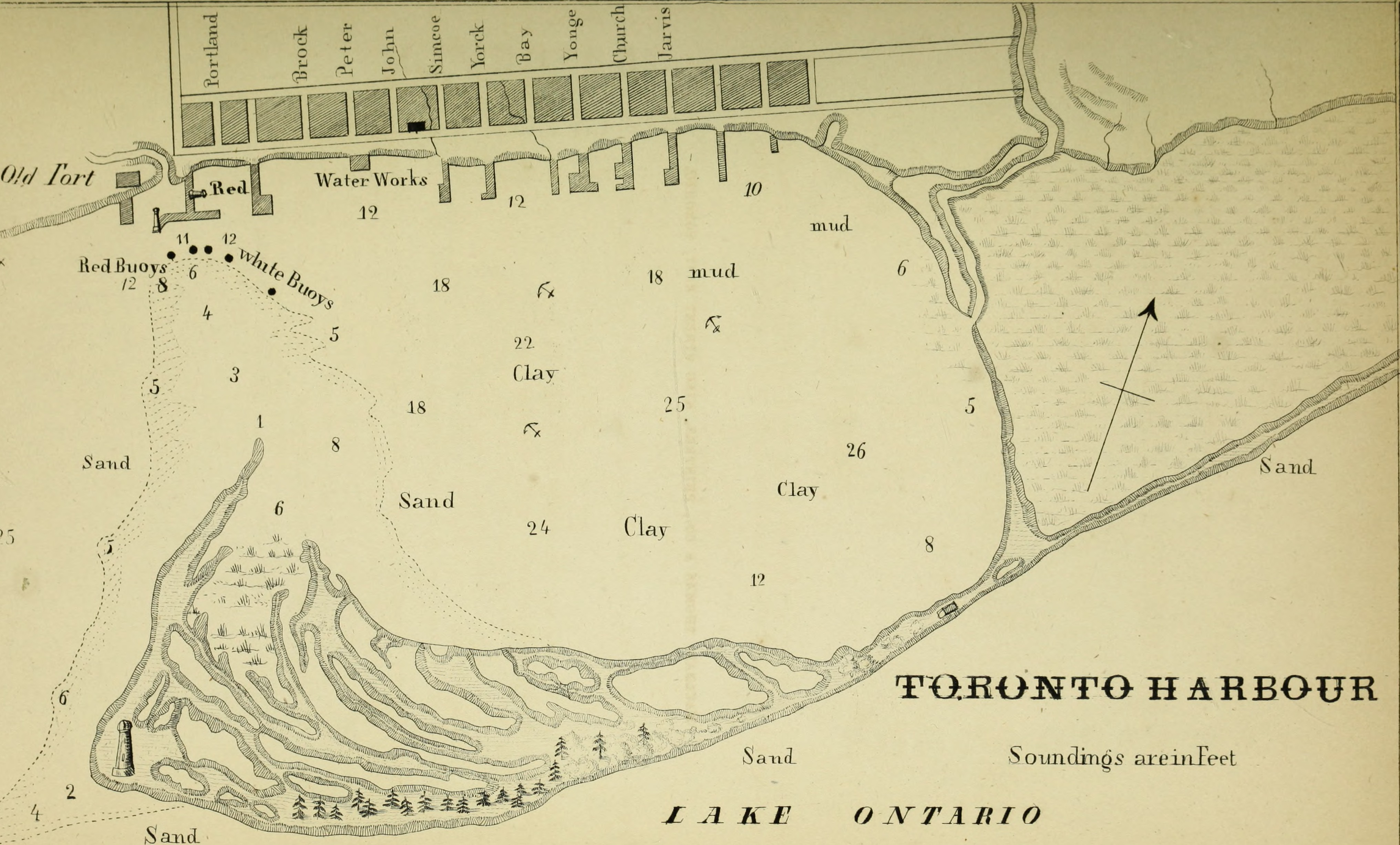
Map of the Toronto Harbour in 1857. Once a peninsula connected to the mainland, a storm in 1858 transformed the peninsula into the Islands.

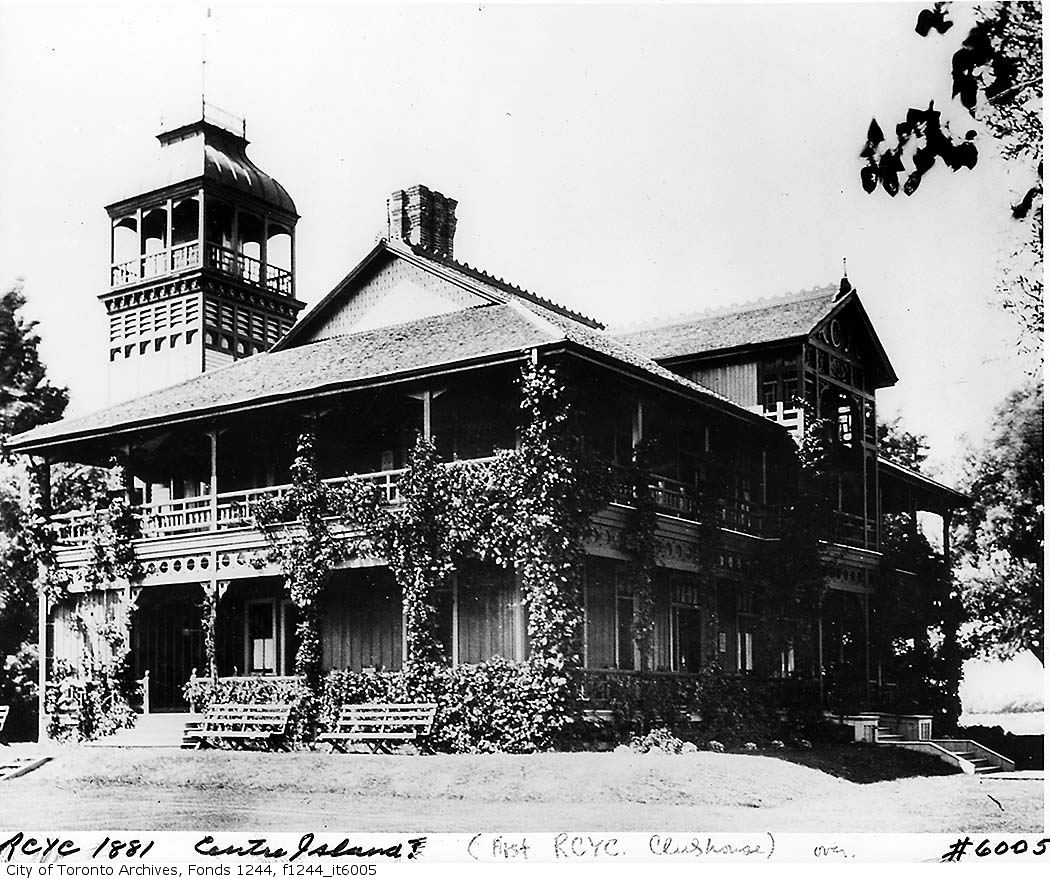
The Royal Canadian Yacht Club's first clubhouse on the Toronto Islands, completed in 1881.

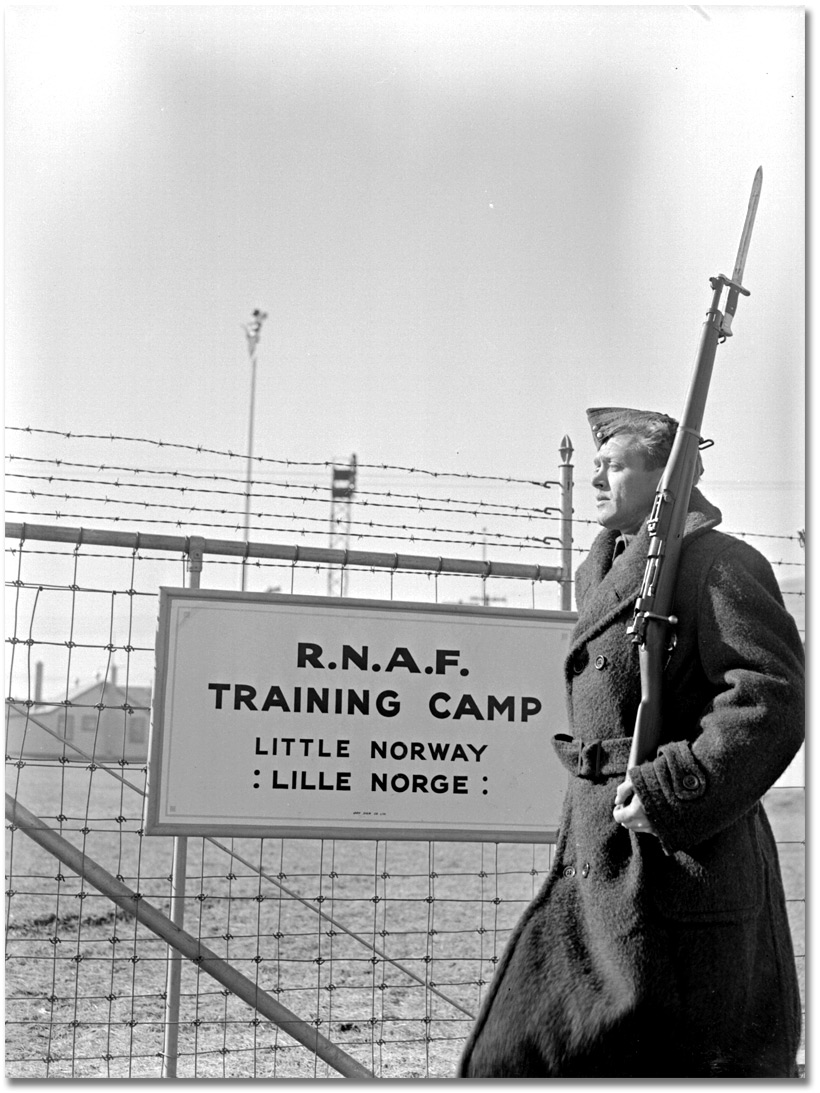
Opened in 1939 Port George VI Island Airport, the airport was used by expatriate Norwegians RNAF pilots-in-training during the Second World War.

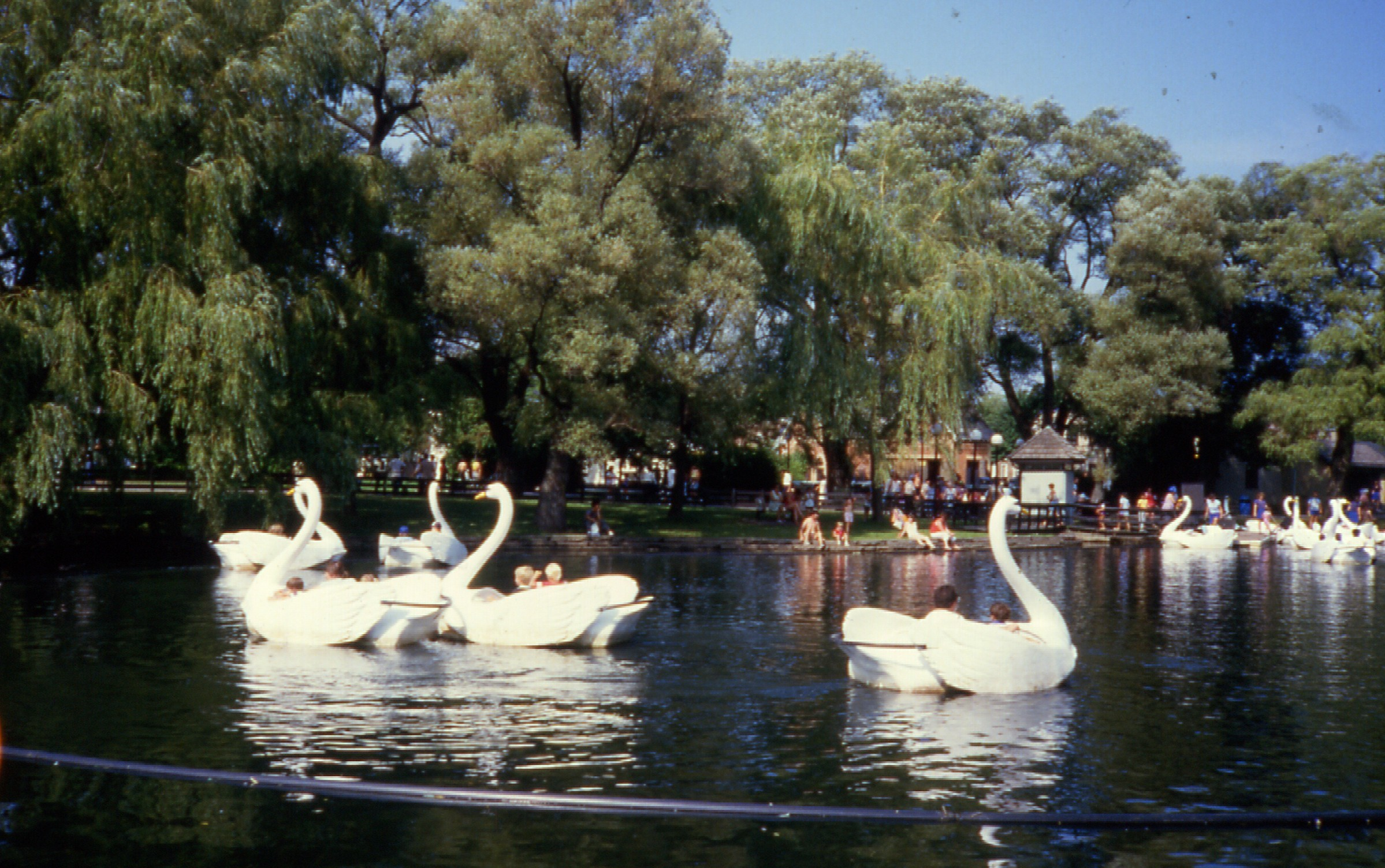
Swan-boat ride at Centreville Amusement Park in 1984. The park was opened in 1967 on Centre Island.

The Toronto Islands were not originally islands but rather a series of sand-bars originating from the deposition of sand from the Scarborough Bluffs, pushed by Lake Ontario currents.

Prior to European colonization, the group of islands (then peninsula) and sandbars was considered a place of healing, leisure, and relaxation by Indigenous peoples. The then peninsula was called or "Island of Hiawatha" or "Menecing," meaning "On the Island" in Ojibwe.

To the descendants of the Ojibwa, now the Mississaugas of the Credit First Nation, the Toronto Islands are sacred land. According to British Crown records, Treaty 13, often referred to as the Toronto Purchase of 1787 and 1805, included the Islands and compensated the Mississaugas with "goods including 2,000 rifle flints, 24 brass kettles, 120 mirrors, 24 laced hats and 96 gallons of rum valued at £1,700 for the sale of Toronto." The Mississaugas, in a land claim settlement process started in 1986, claimed that the Islands, along with other lands, were never included in the agreement and that the compensation was inadequate. In 2010, a settlement was reached which resulted in a CA$145 million payment to the Mississaugas from the Government of Canada. In return, the Mississaugas relinquished their claim to the Islands and other lands in the area.

The peninsula and surrounding sand bars that now form the Toronto Islands were surveyed in 1792 by Lieutenant Joseph Bouchette of the Royal Navy. D.W. Smith's Gazetteer recorded in 1813 that "the long beach or peninsula, which affords a most delightful ride, is considered so healthy by the Indians that they resort to it whenever indisposed". Many Indigenous communities were located between the peninsula's base and the Don River.

During the 1790s, the British built the first buildings on the island. The Gibraltar Point Blockhouse and storage structures were built at Gibraltar Point in 1794. The garrison was known as the Blockhouse Bay garrison, and it supported the garrison on the mainland. By 1800, another blockhouse and a guard house were built. These were destroyed in the Battle of York. Another garrison was built, but it was abandoned by 1823 and demolished in 1833.

The Gibraltar Point Lighthouse was constructed at Gibraltar Point, the south-western extremity of the peninsula in 1809. It is perhaps best known for the demise of its first keeper, German-born John Paul Radelmüller, whose alleged 1815 murder by soldiers from Fort York forms the basis of Toronto's most enduring ghost story. Although the precise circumstances of his death remain a mystery, recent research has verified many aspects of the popular legend. The two soldiers charged with but ultimately acquitted of Radelmüller's murder were John Henry and John Blueman, both of the Glengarry Light Infantry.

The peninsula was first cut off from the mainland to the east by a storm in 1852, but a breakwater was built and the channel was filled in by silt. However, on April 13, 1858, the peninsula became an island permanently by a violent storm that cut a 500-foot (150 m) wide channel. The same storm destroyed two hotels on the island.

After the peninsula became an island, the Hanlan family were among the first year-round inhabitants, settling at Gibraltar Point in 1862. In 1867, the City of Toronto acquired the Islands from the federal government, and the land was divided into lots, allowing seasonal cottages, outdoor amusement areas and summer resort hotels to be built. The west side of the island became a destination for the people of Toronto and the first summer cottage community was built there. In 1878, a hotel was built by John Hanlan at the north-west tip of the island and soon after the area became known as Hanlan's Point. The family built Hanlan's Point Amusement Park in the 1880s. John's son, Edward "Ned" Hanlan, earned international recognition as a rower before taking over his father's business. Other notable families on the Islands included the Durnans (James Durnan was the Gibraltar Point Lighthouse keeper in 1832) and the Wards (David Ward settled on the eastern end in 1830).

At the same time as Hanlan's Point was developing as a summer suburb of Toronto, developments were going on elsewhere on the Islands. Along the lakefront of Centre Island, large Victorian summer homes were built by Toronto's leading families looking for refuge from the summer heat and drawn by the prestigious Royal Canadian Yacht Club, which had moved to a location on the harbour side of RCYC Island in 1881. By contrast, the Ward's Island community began in the 1880s as a tent community. William E. Ward built the Ward's Hotel and a few houses and rented tents to visitors.

The records of the School Board indicate that a one-room school existed on donated land near the Gibraltar Lighthouse in approximately 1888 but it was not necessarily open every day, particularly in winter. The school became permanent in 1896, though still with a single teacher. After it burned down a new school was built; there were 52 students in 1909 and 630 by 1954. As of 2018, the Island Public/Natural Science School operates classes for Junior Kindergarten to grade 6, a residential natural science program (which began in 1960) for visiting grade 5 and 6 students and a day care centre for children ages 2–5.

In 1899, there was a colony of eight summer tenants on Ward's Island paying $10 rent for the season. By 1913, the number of tents pitched had increased to the point where the city felt it necessary to organize the community into streets, and the tents eventually evolved into a seasonal cottage community.

In 1894, a land reclamation project by the Toronto Ferry Company created space to expand the Hanlan's Point Amusement Park at Hanlan's Point. In 1897, the Hanlan's Point Stadium was built alongside the amusement park for the Toronto Maple Leaf baseball team. The stadium was rebuilt several times over the years, and in 1914, Babe Ruth hit his first professional home run into the waters of Lake Ontario from this stadium. In the 1920s, the Maple Leaf team moved to a new stadium on the mainland. In 1926, the Toronto Transit Commission purchased the privately run ferry system along with the amusement park, most of the rides were shut down that year.

From 1915 to 1916, a temporary wooden hangar was built at the beach by the Curtiss Flying School. This floatplane aerodrome was used for flight training for World War I.

In 1937, construction started on a new airport on the site of the park and stadium. The construction of the airport led to the demolition of the stadium and the remainder of the amusement park while the land reclamation connected Hanlan's Point and the Western Sandbar by infilling Hanlan's Lagoon. This meant that the cottage community along the Western Sandbar at Hanlan's Point needed to be relocated. The residents were given the choice of either moving their cottages further south at Hanlan's Point or resettling on Algonquin Island. Originally, Algonquin Island was simply a sandbar known as Sunfish Island that was expanded by land reclamation operations. In 1938, streets were laid out to accommodate 31 cottages that were moved by barge from Hanlan's Point.

The airport opened in 1939, formally named the Port George VI Island Airport, after the reigning monarch of the time. During the first few years of the Second World War, expatriate Norwegian (RNAF) pilots-in-training used the Toronto Island Airport as a training field for both fighter and bomber pilots. Several accidents, including one where a pilot under instruction clipped the funnel and mast of the island ferry boat Sam McBride and crashed, led to the training school being moved north to Muskoka, Ontario. A park on the mainland called Little Norway Park commemorates this period.

In 1947, Toronto City Council approved the year-round occupancy of the Islands to help cope with housing shortages after World War Two, an emergency measure meant to expire in 1968. At its peak in the 1950s, the Island residential community extended from Ward's Island to Hanlan's Point and was made up of some 630 cottages and homes, in addition to amenities including a movie theatre, a bowling alley, stores, hotels, and dance halls. Not long after its creation in 1953, Metropolitan Toronto Council undertook to remove the community and replace it with public parkland. The construction of the Gardiner Expressway had removed many acres of recreational land along the Toronto waterfront, and the Islands lands were to replace the acreage. In 1955, after the city had transferred the lands to Metropolitan Toronto ("Metro"), the new Metro Parks Department started to demolish homes and cottages whose leases had expired or whose leaseholders had surrendered. In 1959, the Metro Parks Department opened Far Enough Farm, and in 1967 opened the Centreville Amusement Park, along with a new public marina. In 1971, Metro Parks opened a new ferry terminal at the foot of Bay Street. Unlike the previous terminal, no waiting room was provided.

By 1963, all Islanders willing to leave the island had departed and the remaining residents started to fight the plans of Metro Council to remove their homes. While demolitions proceeded, community alderman David Rotenberg pushed the Islanders' cause and the number of demolitions dwindled. In 1969, the Toronto Islands' Residents Association (TIRA) was formed. By 1970, 250 homes on Ward's and Algonquin Islands had escaped the bulldozer. The 1970s saw no further demolitions as the Metro Parks plans were delayed by year-to-year leases and the election of Toronto City Councillors who were more sympathetic to the Islanders' situation. In 1973, City Council voted 17–2 to preserve the community and transfer Island lands back to the city. However, Metro Council remained opposed and the Islanders started legal challenges to Metro's plans in 1974 to delay plans of expropriation. By 1978, Metro Council had won several legal battles and had obtained writs of possession for the remaining 250 homes. At the time, a minority provincial Progressive Conservative government was in place with both the Liberal and NDP opposition parties in favour of the Islanders. The Islanders appealed to the provincial government, winning more time when the province agreed to act as mediator between the City and Islanders and Metro.

Matters came to a head on July 28, 1980, when a sheriff sent to serve eviction notices to remaining residents was met at the Algonquin Island Bridge by a crowd of community members, whose leaders persuaded the sheriff to withdraw. On July 31, the community won the right to challenge the 1974 evictions, but the Islanders lost the challenge when the Supreme Court ruled that the city had a right to evict them. The province started a formal inquiry into the Toronto Islands headed by Barry Swadron. On December 18, 1981, the province of Ontario passed a law legalizing the Islanders to stay until 2005. This kept the lands in Metro's ownership, to be leased to the City who would lease it to the Islanders. Wrangling over the terms of the lease payments to Metro took several years. In 1993, Premier of Ontario Bob Rae helped to get Toronto Islands Residential Community Stewardship Act, (S.O. 1993, c. 15) legislation passed, which granted Islanders continued deeds to their houses and 99-year leases on the land. A Land Trust was established to handle any transfers or sales of such properties on the Islands.

There are 262 residential properties on Ward's Island and Algonquin Island as of late 2018. Under the Act, the deed to a house may be transferred only to the current owner's child or spouse. If the house must be sold for personal reasons, and if a child or spouse will not be the new owner, the process is handled by the Toronto Islands Residential Community Trust Corporation. The house and the land lease are sold for the owner's benefit, but the buyer must be an individual on a 500-person waiting list which was established through a lottery. A firm price is set by the Trust; no bids or negotiation are allowed. This process was intended to eliminate the risk of the homes being sold on the open market, driving up the prices, and preventing a windfall for the owner.

== Geography ==
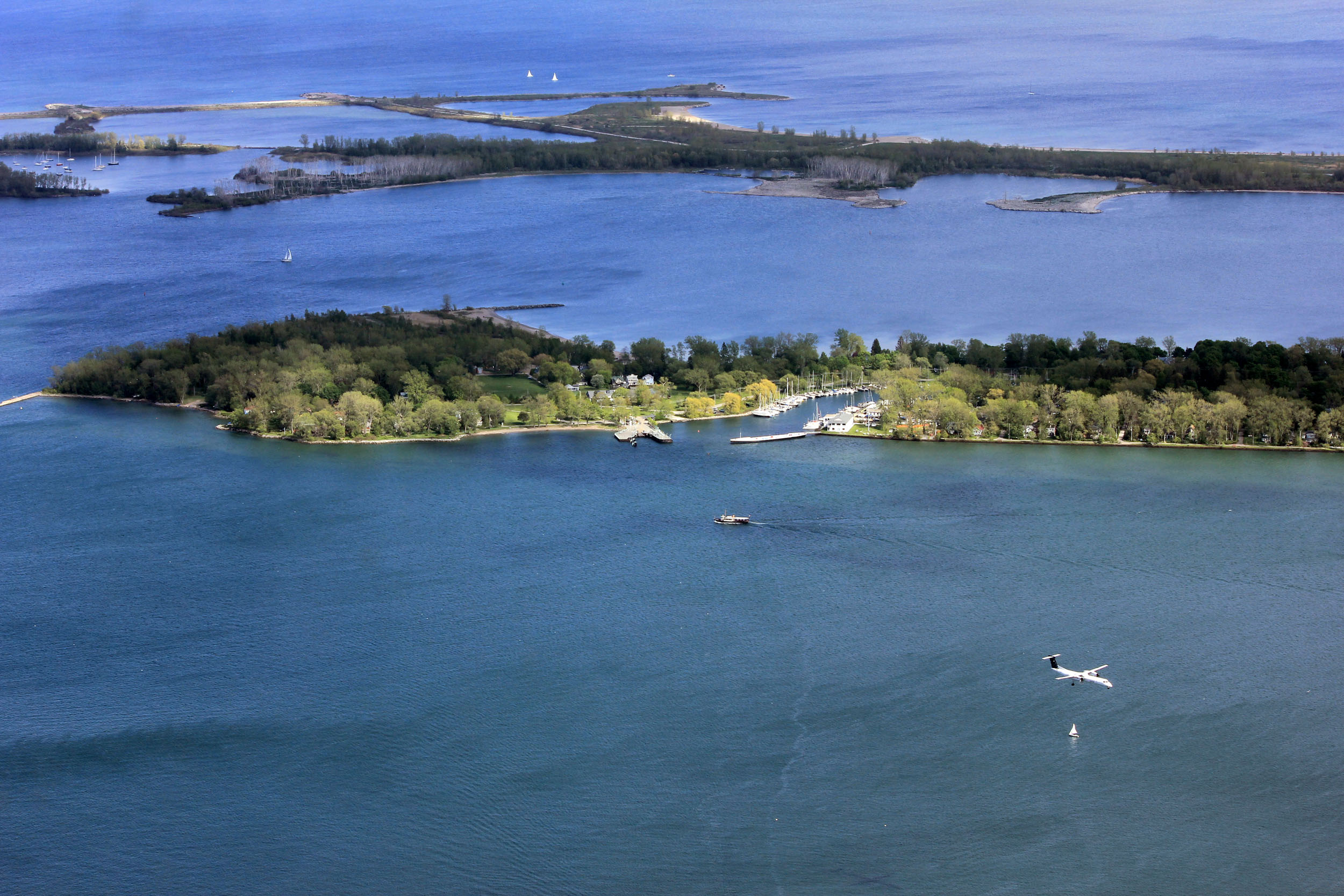
Ward's Island, the easternmost island, with the Leslie Street Spit in the background. The channel to the east (left) of Ward's Island is the Eastern Channel, one of two access points to Toronto's Inner Harbour.

The area of the Islands is about 820 acres (330 ha). The largest, outermost island, called Centre Island, is crescent-shaped and forms the shoreline of both the Eastern and Western Channels. Algonquin Island (formerly known as Sunfish Island) and Olympic Island are two of the other major islands. The former is mostly a residential area and the latter is public parkland. What is commonly called Ward's Island is actually the eastern end of Centre Island, and like Algonquin is mostly a residential area. The Centre Island dock and Centreville Amusement Park are located on Middle Island, which as a consequence, is often mistaken for Centre Island. Centre Island is sometimes referred to as Toronto Island (note the singular form) to prevent this type of confusion. Other smaller islands include:

- Mugg's Island – home to the Island Yacht Club
- Forestry Island – heavily forested and no fixed link to other islands
- Snake Island – heavily forested and beach facing Toronto Harbour (Snake Island Park); access from the pedestrian bridge on the south side to Centre Island
- North Chippewa Island – partially forested and used by the Royal Canadian Yacht Club to store ships and with a mini clubhouse
- South Chippewa Island – heavily forested and located between Snake Island and South Island
- South Island – used for mooring and on-land storage of boats by the Royal Canadian Yacht Club; east end of the island cut off at Chippewa Avenue and covered by trees; a tennis court is located on west end of the island
- RCYC Island – occupied by Royal Canadian Yacht Club with clubhouse, moorings and other club facilities; private pier for RCYC launches Kwasind and Hiawatha to the mainland

Three unnamed islands occupy what was once Blockhouse Bay and Long Pond:

- a small, heavily forested island between Lighthouse Pond and the water treatment plant
- an island (sometimes called Senator Frank Patrick O'Connor Island) – located in between Chippewa Island and Snake Island
- a small ring-shaped island in Long Pond known as the Settling Basin (the former water intake for the City of Toronto) – located across from Mugg's Island
- another small island (sometimes called Duckling Island) in Long Pond (completely covered in shrubbery) – located near Middle Island

The Islands were originally a 9-kilometre-long (5.6-mile) peninsula or sand spit extending from the mainland. The Islands are composed of alluvial deposits from the erosion of the Scarborough Bluffs. The flow from the Niagara River to the south across Lake Ontario causes a counter-clockwise east-to-west current which has, over time, deposited sediments at the south end of the harbour to form a sand spit.

In 1852, a storm flooded sand pits on the peninsula, creating a channel east of Ward's Island. The channel was widened and made permanent by a violent storm on April 13, 1858. The channel became known as the Eastern Gap. The peninsula to the west became known as the Toronto Islands. To the east of the Gap, the area of today's Cherry Beach was known as "Fisherman's Island".

Sediment deposition to the Islands halted in the 1960s when the Leslie Street Spit was extended beyond the southern edge of the islands. Left to nature, the islands would diminish over time, but this is limited due to hard shorelines built to limit erosion. Over the years, land reclamation has contributed to an increase in the size of the islands. The harbour was shallow with a sandy bottom and the sands were moved by dredging or suction methods. Ward's Island was expanded by dredging. Today's Algonquin Island, formerly known as Sunfish Island, was created from harbour bottom sands.

The area now occupied by the airport has been subject to several landfills over what was once sandy shoal, initially to accommodate the amusement park that preceded the airport, and then to accommodate the airport itself. The Western Channel to the north of the airport is part of the original western channel, which was just south of today's Fort York. It was opened in 1911 as part of a program to improve boat navigation into the harbour. The airport lands were created from harbour sands in the late 1930s.

A series of waterways allow boat traffic to navigate the Islands:

- Allan Lamport Regatta Course – located between Centre Island and Middle Island from Long Pond to east end of Far Enough Farm
- Block House Bay – located on the east side of Hanlan's Point
- Deep Pike Cut – located on the east side of Mugg's Island
- Lighthouse Pond – located west of Gibraltar Point lighthouse, also known as the trout pond
- Long Pond – located between Allan Lamport Regatta Course and Block House Bay; also referred to as Kennedy Pond in the 1890s
- Snake Pond – located between Snug Harbour and Algonquin Island
- Snug Harbour – located between Snake Island and Olympic Island
- Sunfish Cut – located between Snake Island and Algonquin Island

Hanlan's Bay/Lagoon was a waterway that has since been buried under the Toronto Island Airport runways.

Jim Crow Pond – filled in by South Island

Ward's Pond – located roughly along the south side of Olympic Island and South Island

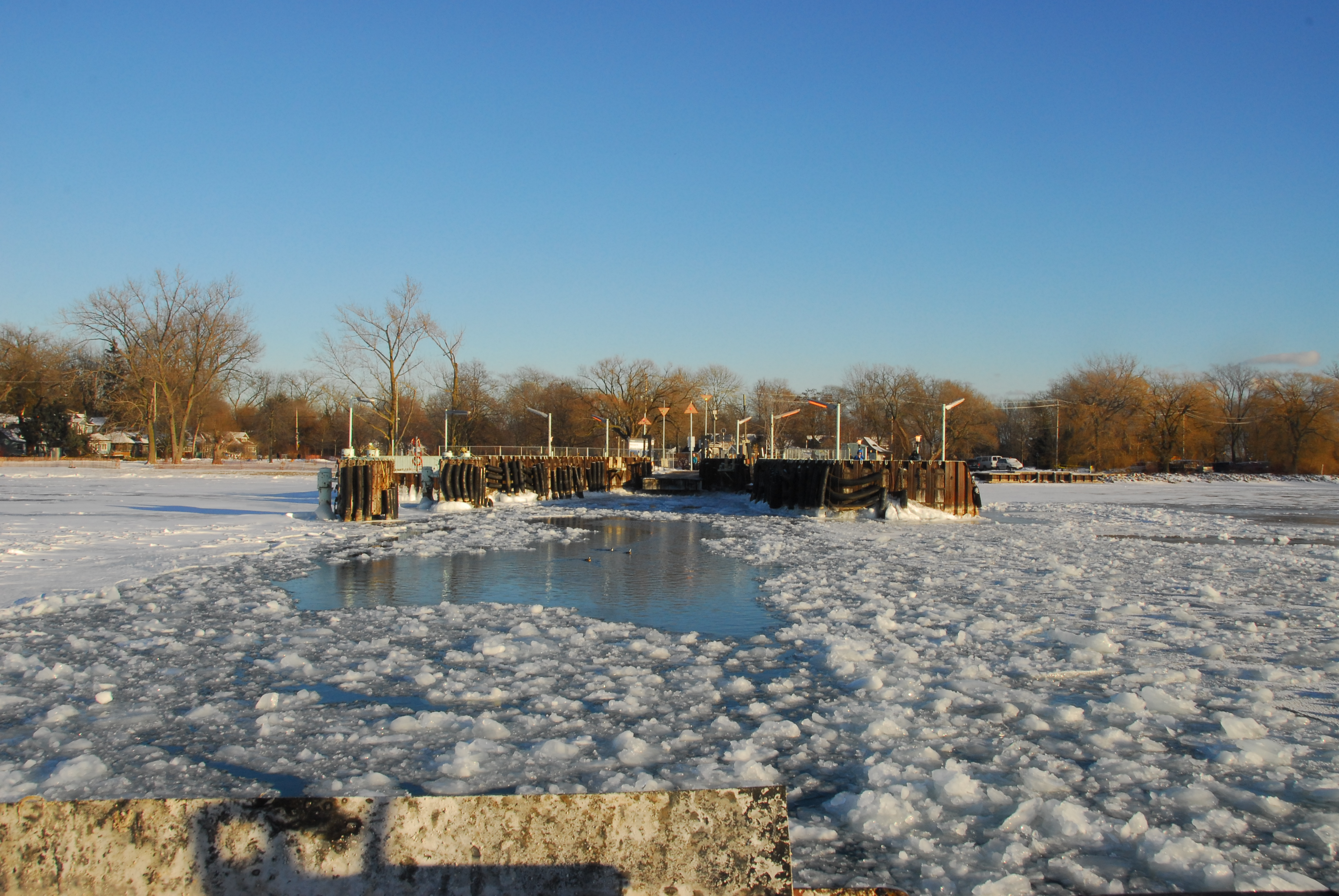
A partially frozen harbour on the Islands. Due to Lake Ontario's depth, the water in the lake is sometimes warmer than the air above it.

=== Climate ===
The Toronto Island has a humid continental climate (Dfb) under the Köppen climate classification system.

The climate differs from the mainland in that cooler lake waters surrounding the island cool spring, summer and early fall daytime temperatures by 2–3 °C, on average. In winter, the unfrozen lake waters are sometimes warmer than the air; temperatures are roughly equivalent to the downtown area but warmer than areas further away from the lake. Fog and low clouds are more frequent at the island than on the mainland. Nearshore areas of the lake only freeze after a consistent period of below-freezing weather.

The highest temperature ever recorded at Toronto Island was 37.2 °C (99.0 °F) on 15 June 1919. The coldest temperature ever recorded was −30.0 °C (−22.0 °F) on 13 January 1914.

Climate data for Toronto (Toronto Island Airport, Harbourfront) WMO ID: 71265; Climate ID: 6158665; coordinates 43°47′43″N 79°23′42″W; elevation: 76.5 m (251 ft) (Note: Includes Toronto City Centre; WMO ID: 71265; Climate ID: 6158667; coordinates 43°47′43″N 79°23′42″W; elevation: 76.8 m (252 ft) and Toronto City Centre; WMO ID: 71265; Climate ID: 6158359; coordinates 43°47′39″N 79°23′46″W; elevation: 76.8 m (252 ft)); 1991–2020 normals (Note: Humidex, temperatures, wind chill and humidity) and 1981–2010 normals (Note: Precipitation and precipitation days), extremes 1905–present
Month	Jan	Feb	Mar	Apr	May	Jun	Jul	Aug	Sep	Oct	Nov	Dec	Year
Record high humidex	13.2	17.5	22.3	31.8	38.8	45.5	48.6	45.3	43.0	38.3	23.3	15.8	48.6
Record high °C (°F)	14.1 (57.4)	18.5 (65.3)	22.5 (72.5)	30.1 (86.2)	34.1 (93.4)	37.2 (99.0)	37.0 (98.6)	36.1 (97.0)	33.4 (92.1)	30.8 (87.4)	20.4 (68.7)	17.3 (63.1)	37.2 (99.0)
Mean daily maximum °C (°F)	−0.5 (31.1)	0.3 (32.5)	4.2 (39.6)	10.2 (50.4)	16.8 (62.2)	22.3 (72.1)	25.3 (77.5)	24.8 (76.6)	20.9 (69.6)	13.8 (56.8)	7.5 (45.5)	2.5 (36.5)	12.4 (54.3)
Daily mean °C (°F)	−3.8 (25.2)	−3.1 (26.4)	0.8 (33.4)	6.5 (43.7)	12.6 (54.7)	18.1 (64.6)	21.0 (69.8)	21.0 (69.8)	17.2 (63.0)	10.5 (50.9)	4.6 (40.3)	−0.3 (31.5)	8.8 (47.8)
Mean daily minimum °C (°F)	−7.1 (19.2)	−6.4 (20.5)	−2.5 (27.5)	2.7 (36.9)	8.3 (46.9)	13.9 (57.0)	16.7 (62.1)	17.2 (63.0)	13.4 (56.1)	7.0 (44.6)	1.7 (35.1)	−3.1 (26.4)	5.1 (41.2)
Record low °C (°F)	−30.0 (−22.0)	−29.4 (−20.9)	−23.1 (−9.6)	−13.3 (8.1)	−3.3 (26.1)	2.2 (36.0)	4.4 (39.9)	5.0 (41.0)	1.7 (35.1)	−5.0 (23.0)	−13.9 (7.0)	−27.2 (−17.0)	−30.0 (−22.0)
Record low wind chill	−36.8	−39.6	−34.0	−17.0	−6.7	0.0	0.0	0.0	0.0	−5.0	−21.2	−34.4	−39.6
Average precipitation mm (inches)	45.3 (1.78)	48.6 (1.91)	54.8 (2.16)	63.9 (2.52)	75.0 (2.95)	62.7 (2.47)	65.0 (2.56)	84.8 (3.34)	86.3 (3.40)	67.1 (2.64)	83.4 (3.28)	60.4 (2.38)	797.3 (31.39)
Average rainfall mm (inches)	19.5 (0.77)	23.0 (0.91)	39.6 (1.56)	61.5 (2.42)	75.0 (2.95)	62.7 (2.47)	65.0 (2.56)	84.8 (3.34)	86.3 (3.40)	67.1 (2.64)	78.5 (3.09)	41.1 (1.62)	704.0 (27.72)
Average snowfall cm (inches)	28.1 (11.1)	26.3 (10.4)	15.5 (6.1)	2.7 (1.1)	0.0 (0.0)	0.0 (0.0)	0.0 (0.0)	0.0 (0.0)	0.0 (0.0)	0.03 (0.01)	4.8 (1.9)	19.7 (7.8)	97.1 (38.2)
Average precipitation days (≥ 0.2 mm)	13.9	11.6	11.7	12.7	12.3	10.7	10.3	10.9	11.4	12.3	13.4	13.0	144.2
Average rainy days (≥ 0.2 mm)	4.4	5.1	8.4	11.8	12.3	10.7	10.3	10.9	11.4	12.3	12.0	7.4	117.0
Average snowy days (≥ 0.2 cm)	10.5	8.3	5.3	1.6	0.0	0.0	0.0	0.0	0.0	0.07	2.4	7.7	35.6
Average relative humidity (%) (at 1500 LST)	69.5	66.8	63.6	63.4	66.1	67.9	67.2	68.3	67.4	69.5	70.8	70.6	67.6
Source: Environment and Climate Change Canada (June maximum) (January minimum) (Canadian Climate Normals 1981–2010}

== Culture ==
=== Community ===
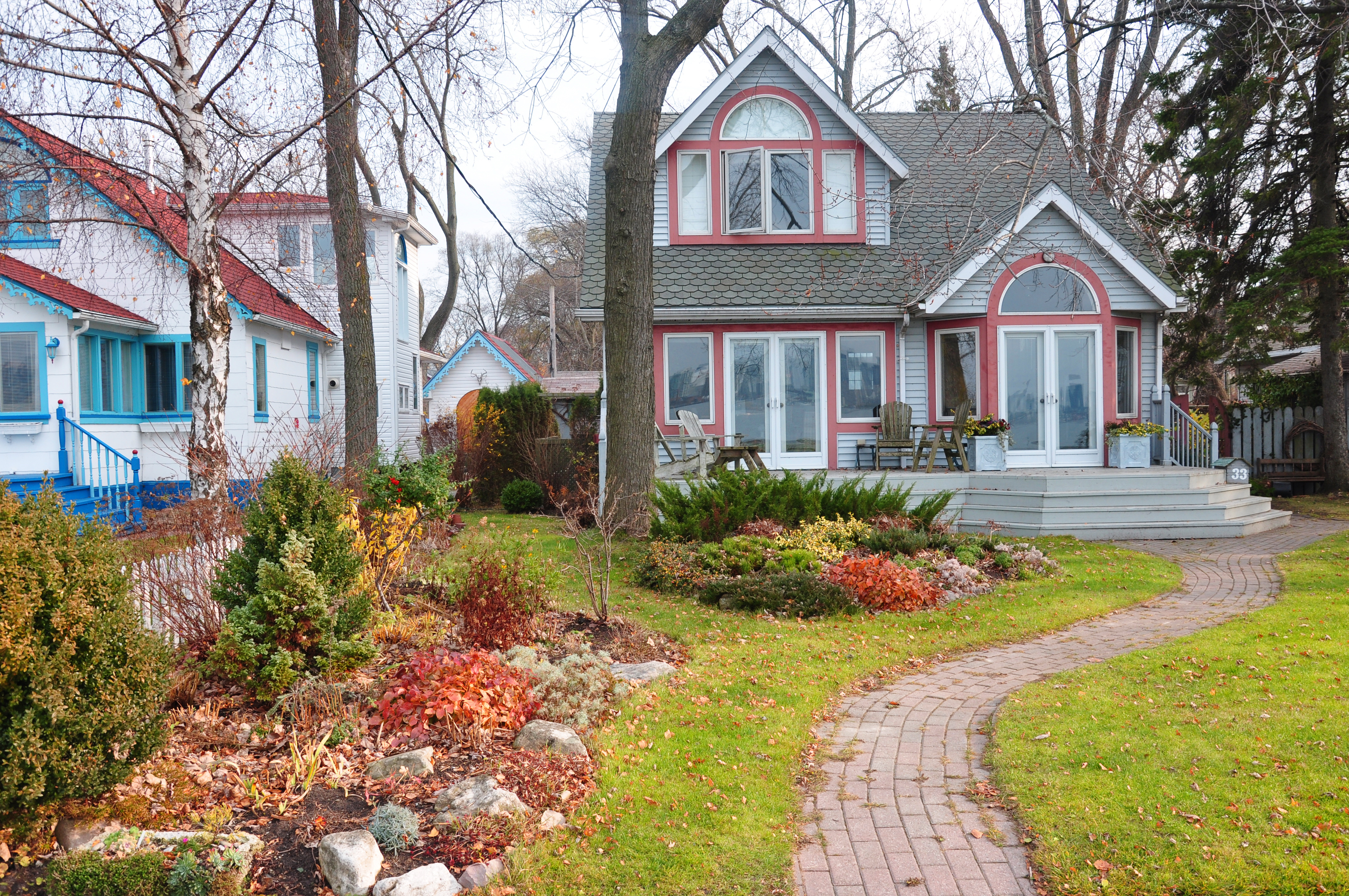
A local residence at the Toronto Islands. Approximately 300 homes are located on the Islands.

A community of about 300 homes is located on the Toronto Islands, concentrated at the eastern end of the island chain on Ward's Island and Algonquin Island. Under the terms of the Toronto Islands Residential Community Stewardship Act there are strict rules under provincial law governing the buying and selling of these homes.

There are two daycare centres, one school and one church on the islands. The Toronto Island Public School, located at Gibraltar Point, operates a day program for island residents, residents of the Toronto waterfront and other students that can apply for enrollment, up to grade 6. There is also a residential natural science program for visiting grade 5 and 6 students from the mainland, and a pre-school nursery. The Waterfront Montessori Children's Centre is a non-profit, parent-run co-operative pre-school on Algonquin Island. St. Andrew by-the-Lake Anglican Church is located on Centre Island, and serves the islands' residents and visitors. The semi-Gothic/Medieval/Stick Style building was built in 1884 and moved later to its current location.

The Ward's Island residential community encompasses 12 acres (5 ha) of the entire 820-acre (330 ha) Toronto Island park. There are approximately 150 residences, most of which are occupied on a yearly basis and a centrally located Ward's Island Association club house which was built 1937–8. The layout of the streets remains as it has been since 1915 and the streets are named sequentially First, Second, Third, Fourth, Fifth, Sixth Streets, as well as Bayview, Willow, Channel, Lenore and Lakeshore Avenues and Withrow Street.

Artscape Gibraltar Point occupies buildings previously used by the Toronto Island Public School, and comprises more than 15 artist work studios occupied by a mix of painters, ceramists, sculptors, musicians, theatre companies, and a recording studio.

=== Recreation ===
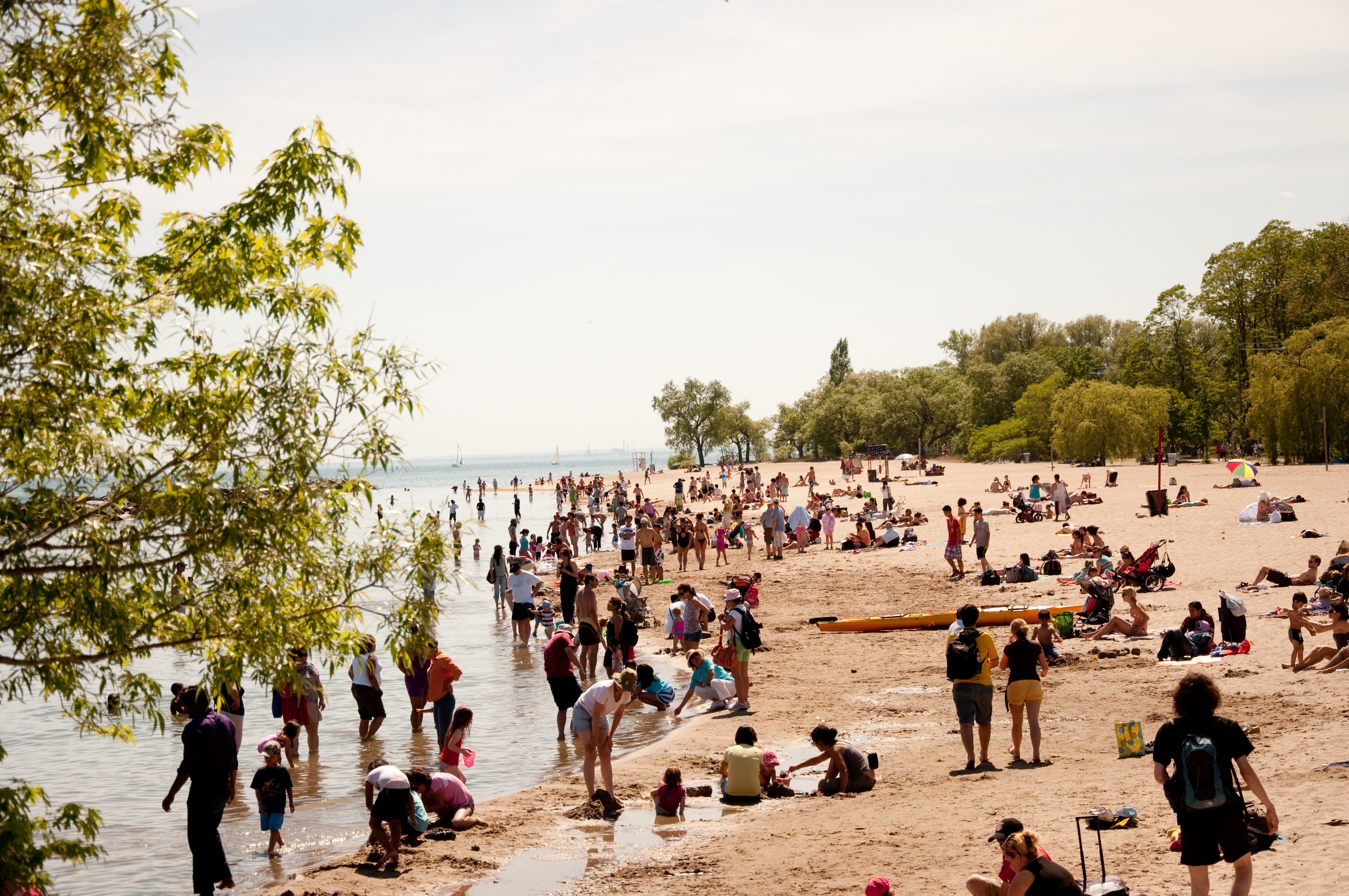
Centre Island Beach, one of several beaches located on the Toronto Islands.

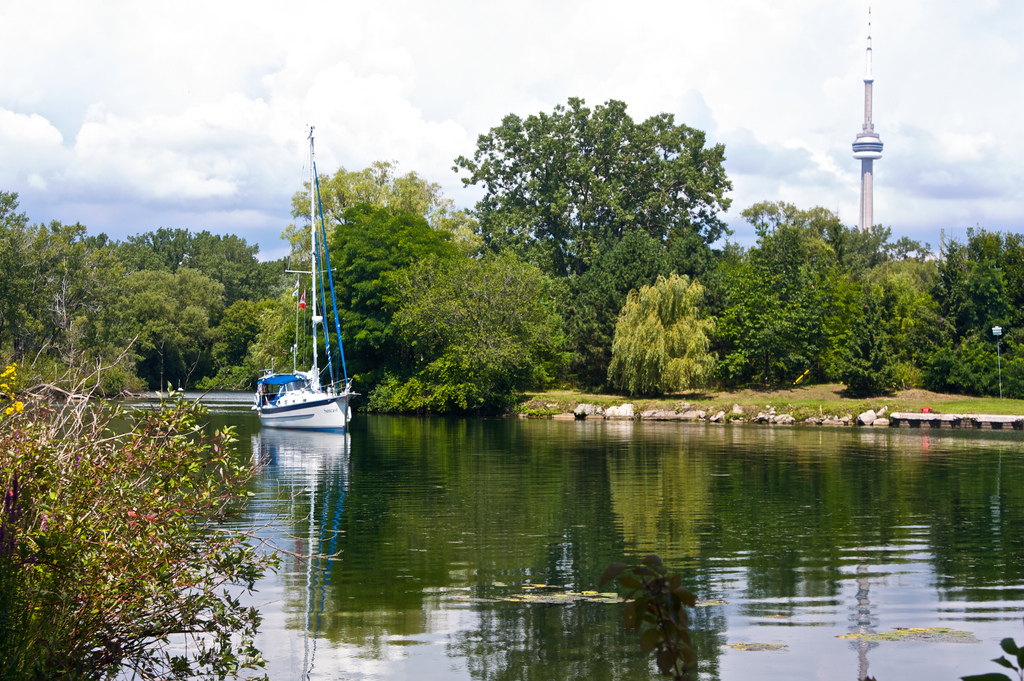
Recreational boating on the Islands

Avenue of the Island

There are several swimming beaches on the Islands, including Centre Island Beach, Manitou Beach, Gibraltar Point Beach, Hanlan's Point Beach and Ward's Island Beach. Hanlan's Point Beach is an officially recognized nude beach, one of only two in Canada. Ward's Island Beach is located on the island east end near the Eastern Gap. Centre Island Beach is located on the south side of the island and faces out to Lake Ontario. The beach is actually two beaches with the portion west of the Lookout Pier called Manitou Beach. The eastern boundary is near the western end of the boardwalk from Ward's Island. Hanlan's Point Beach is located on the west side of Toronto Islands on Lake Ontario, south of the airport and Hanlan's Point ferry dock.

Recreational boating has been popular on the Islands for over a century. In 1965, the Toronto Island Sailing Club was founded on Algonquin Island out of the former Algonquin Island Schoolhouse. In 1970, the club moved to the northwest peninsula of Centre Island in the newly opened Toronto Island Marina. The club offers its members certified CANSail courses and competitive racing events with other dinghy clubs, and is also a member in good standing with Sail Canada, Ontario Sailing and the Canadian Albacore Association.

The Islands are home to four yacht clubs: Harbour City Yacht Club, Island Yacht Club, Queen City Yacht Club and the Royal Canadian Yacht Club. There is a public marina, the Toronto Island Marina, and several smaller clubs including the Sunfish Cut Boat Club and the Toronto Island Canoe Club. There is also a dragon boat regatta course and grandstand, where the Toronto International Dragon Boat Race Festival is held annually. Canoes, kayaks, paddle boats and stand up paddle boards are available for rental.

Centreville Amusement Park is a children's amusement park which was built in 1967 with a 1900s-style turn-of-the-century theme. The park includes a miniature railway and an antique carousel and is open daily in summer. The Far Enough Farm is nearby and displays common farm livestock and birds. The Franklin's Garden children's garden was created in the 2000s and is located to the west of the Avenue of the Islands. A splash pad, hedge maze, and playground are also located nearby.

On the western side of Ward's Island is a flying disc golf course. There is a community tennis club at the Ward's Island Tennis Club.

Until 2007, Caribana held an annual arts festival at Olympic Island on the August long weekend. Other Island events include the Olympic Island Festival, an annual rock concert held from 2004 until 2010. It was initiated in 2004 by Sloan's Jay Ferguson. The Wakestock festival has also been held on the islands. Starting in 1975, the Canadian Open Frisbee Championships were held on Olympic and Ward's Island.

== Education ==
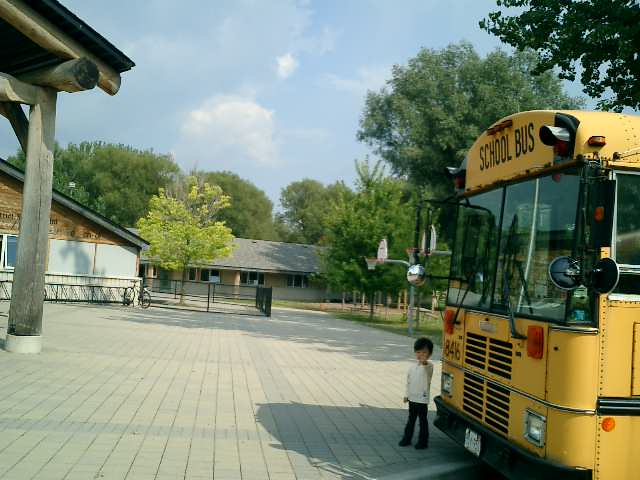
Island Public/Natural Science School is a public elementary school operated by the Toronto District School Board.

The Toronto District School Board (TDSB) serves the Toronto Islands. Currently the school board operates one elementary school on the Islands, Island Public/Natural Science School on Centre Island. As of 2013 the school has 179 students. 15% of the student population originates from Algonquin and Ward islands and about 85% of the students live in the city and take ferry transportation to school.

Other TDSB schools attended by students that live on the Island include The Waterfront School, Jarvis Collegiate Institute, Central Technical School, Central Commerce Collegiate Institute, and Northern Secondary School. However, these schools are located on the mainland.

In addition to the TDSB, three other public school boards also provide schooling for residents of Toronto Islands, Conseil scolaire catholique MonAvenir (CSCM), Conseil scolaire Viamonde (CSV), and Toronto Catholic District School Board (TCDSB). CSV is a public French first language secular school board. CSCM, and TCDSB are public separate school boards, the former being a French first language school board, the latter being an English first language school board.

== Politics ==
The islands are within the Spadina—Fort York federal riding, the Spadina—Fort York provincial riding and the Spadina–Fort York Ward 10 municipal district. The islands are represented federally by Liberal Party of Canada MP Chi Nguyen, provincially by NDP MPP Chris Glover, and municipally by councillor Ausma Malik.

The islands were part of the federal riding of Trinity—Spadina from 2004 until 2015. From 1997 to 2004 the area was part of Toronto Centre—Rosedale, from 1966 to 1997 it was part of Rosedale, from 1933 to 1966 it was part of Spadina and from 1903 to 1933 it was part of Toronto South.

The islands were in the provincial riding of Trinity—Spadina from 2007 until 2018. From 1999 to 2007 the area was part of Toronto Centre—Rosedale, and from 1987 to 1999 it was part of Fort York.

== Transportation ==
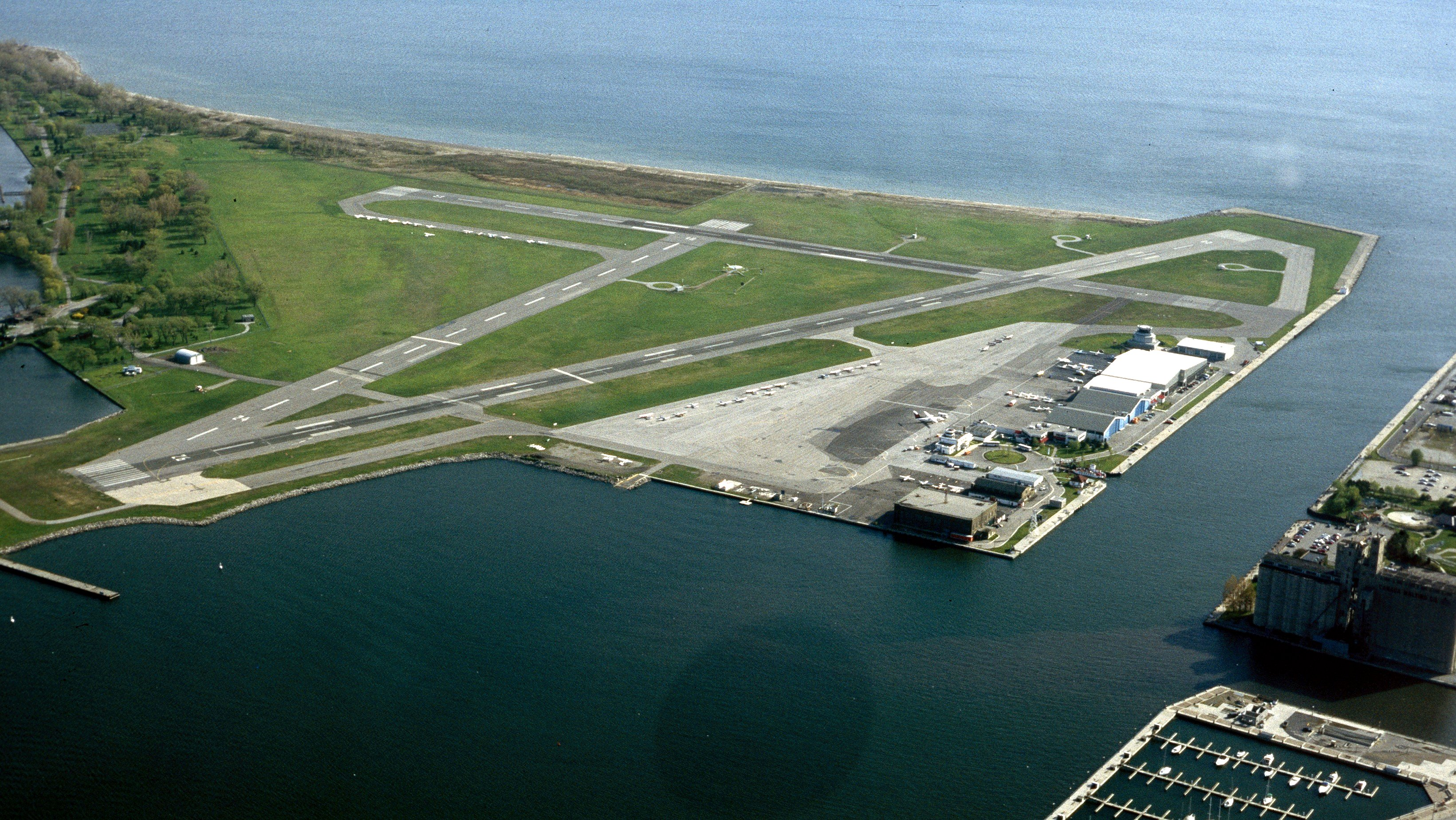
Billy Bishop Toronto City Airport is located on the north-western tip of the Toronto Islands.

=== Airport ===
The north-western tip of the Toronto Islands is home to the Billy Bishop Toronto City Airport, more often known as the Toronto Island Airport. The airport is used for civil aviation, including airlines, flight training, medevac flights and private aviation. Since 1984, it has been used for regional airlines using approved STOL-type aircraft. In recent years, the airport has become the centre of controversy between those who wish to close it down, and those who want to expand its usage. A plan to construct a road bridge to the airport became a major issue in the 2003 election for mayor, and was cancelled after David Miller was elected. A pedestrian tunnel to the airport was opened in July 2015, but does not connect to the rest of the island park. A proposal to allow jets at the airport was turned down by the Government of Canada.

=== Ferry services ===
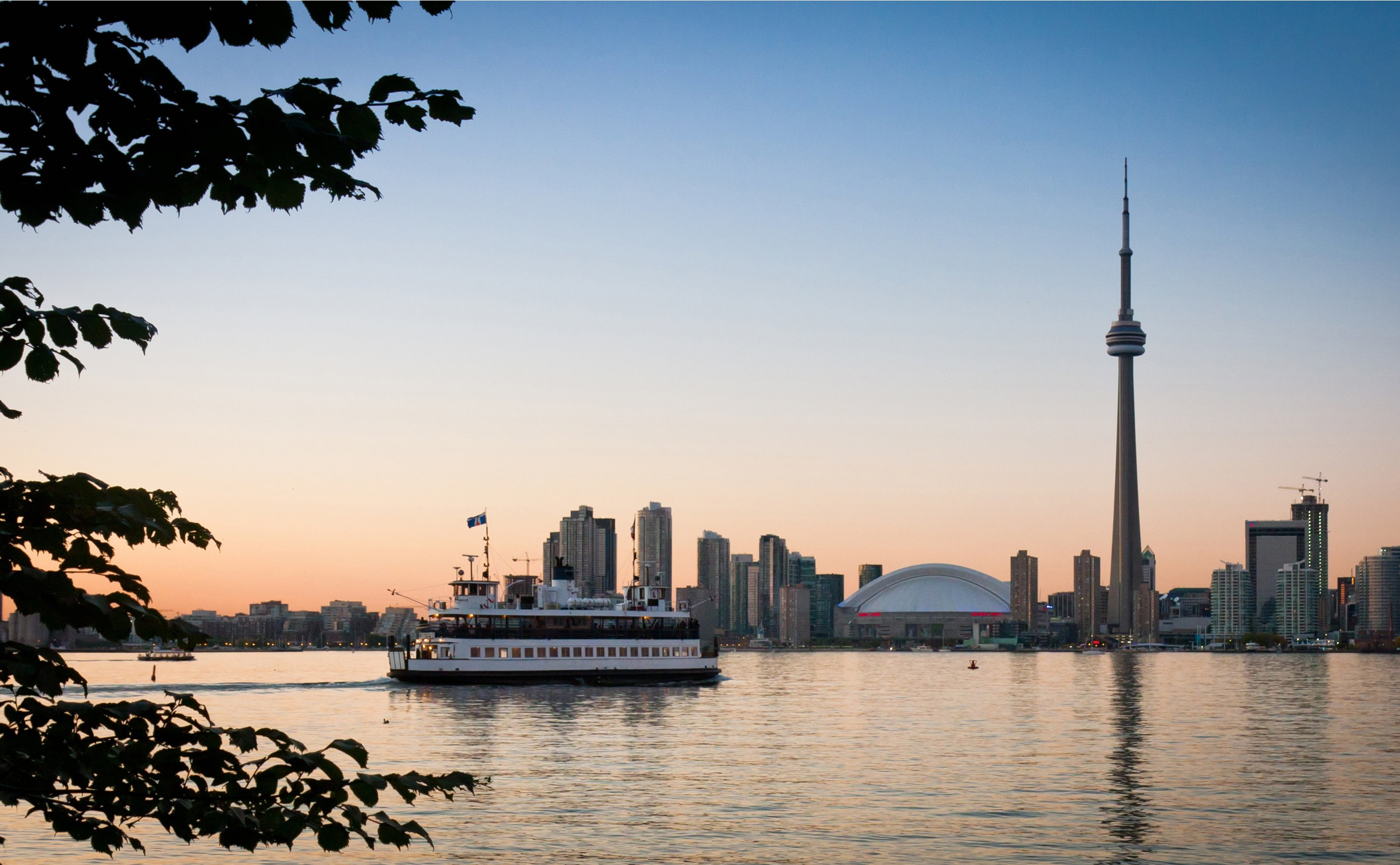
A Toronto Island ferry departs for the city. Ferries, water taxis, and private boats is the primary way to get to the islands, with no fixed road link connecting it to the rest of the city.

There is no fixed road link from the mainland to the Toronto Islands, which therefore rely on ferries, water taxis and other boats for their transport needs.

Three public ferry routes provide links for visitors, island residents, and service vehicles from the Jack Layton Ferry Terminal on the central Toronto waterfront to docks at Hanlan's Point, Centre Island Park, and Ward's Island. The only year-round ferry service is to and from Ward's Island. A fourth public ferry service provides a vehicle and passenger connection from a dock at the foot of Bathurst Street to the airport. There is no public access between the airport and the rest of the island chain.

In addition to the public ferry services, several yacht clubs and marinas located on the islands provide private-tender services for their members and guests. In June 2017, Centreville purchased a used ferry boat, the Dartmouth III, from Halifax Transit in Nova Scotia and planned to operate its own service, Toronto Island Transit Service, to supplement the public ferry. The ferry arrived in Toronto but due to flooding and the pandemic, it was never used to bring passengers across the harbour.

=== Roads ===
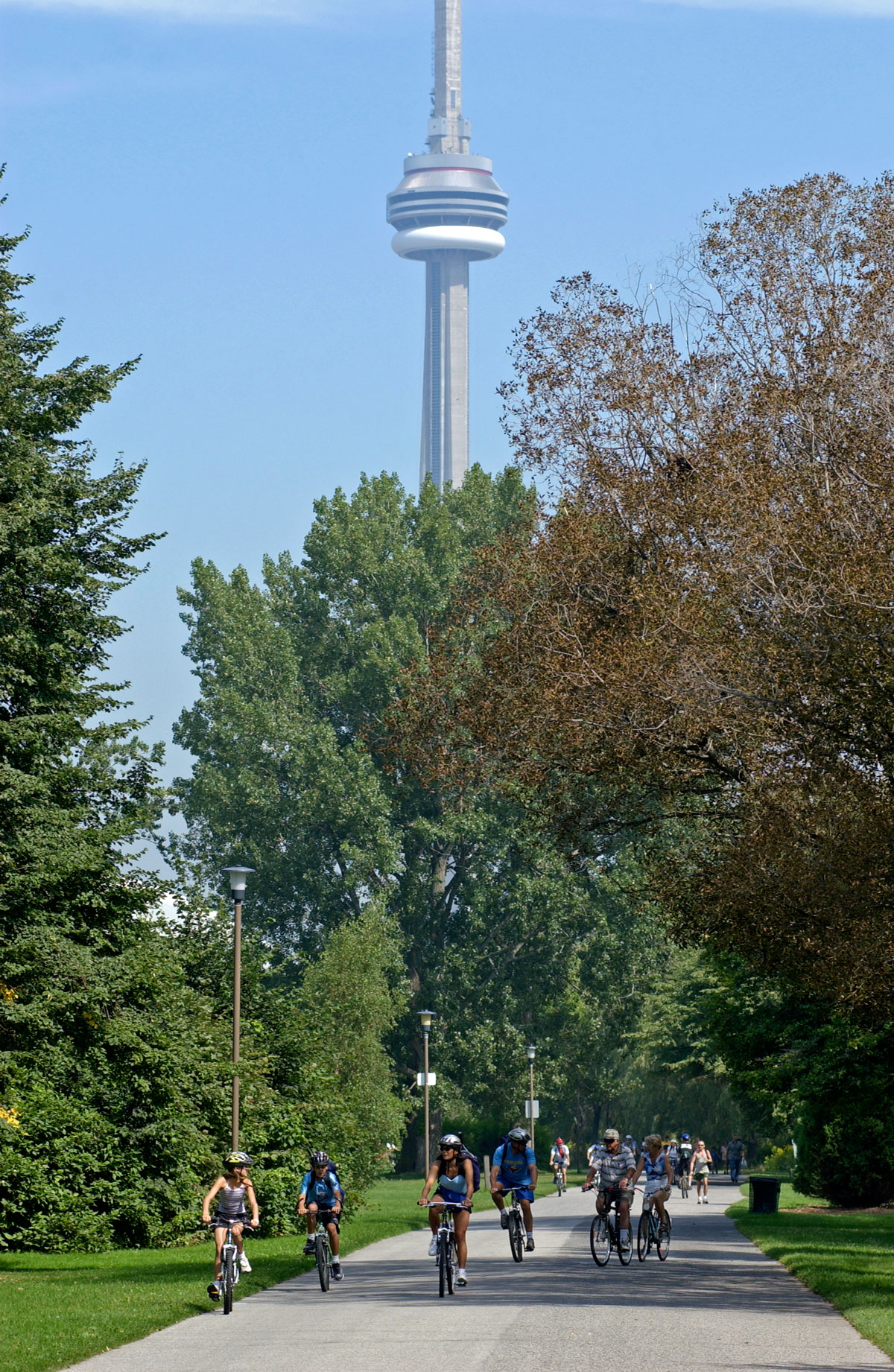
Cyclist on Centre Island. Motor vehicles on the Islands are limited to City of Toronto government service vehicles.

Roads on the islands are paved, the only exception being a long wooden boardwalk on the south end of Ward's Island. The use of motor vehicles is limited to City of Toronto government service vehicles (Parks and Recreation, paramedics etc.), an exception being parking and roadways at the airport. Bicycles are welcome on the ferries and the island, and there are rental bicycles and quadricycles available on the island. Lakeshore Avenue is the main road handling vehicular traffic. The single-lane paved road traverses the east, south and west sides of the park. The six bridges on the island are for pedestrian traffic, bicycles and all-terrain vehicles only. The bridge carrying traffic from Avenue of the Islands can support large vehicles, but not cars or heavy trucks. Other bridges include:

- two bridges connecting Centre Island with Olympic Island
- bridge along Chippewa Avenue to South Island
- bridge over to Snake Island
- Algonquin Road Bridge to Algonquin Island

The Island Bus runs during Toronto Island Ferry downtime, when ferries cannot operate due to high winds, unfavourable weather conditions, a frozen harbour, or maintenance, on a very occasional basis usually during the winter months. When in use, visitors may cross at Island Airport via tunnel or ferry and take the bus from outside the main terminal. Because the bus crosses live airport runways, each crossing has to be accompanied by an escort. Two Toronto Transit Commission (TTC) GM TC40-102N buses provided service to the Toronto Parks Department for use on the Island during the 1970s. Since they were withdrawn it has become usual for TTC to assign to the Island a bus from a series that is coming to the end of its service life. A GM New Look operated on the Island until Spring 2012 after its regular service ended. Orion V #7106 was based on the Toronto Islands until it was replaced by Orion VII OG #7953.

There are fewer restrictions on motor vehicles on the airport lands, with a vehicular ferry providing access to parking lots and service access at the airport, however there is no public road access from the airport lands to the rest of the islands.

== In popular culture ==
The Toronto Islands have appeared as significant settings in Canadian literature. Examples include Margaret Atwood's The Robber Bride and Robert Rotenberg's Old City Hall.

The novel Heyday, by Marnie Woodrow, has two narratives, one set on Ward's Island in the present day, and the other set on Hanlan's in 1909.

Claudia Dey's novel Stunt is also set on Ward's Island.

In Take This Waltz, a 2011 film by Canadian director Sarah Polley, the main character Margot (Michelle Williams) rides the Scrambler at the Centreville Amusement Park.

The second season of Sensitive Skin is set predominantly on the islands when the main character, Davina moves to a houseboat located on the islands.

Canadian singer-songwriter Jordan Paul composed his song Ward's Island, inspired by and during a visit to the island. The song was subsequently recorded with Jon Anderson, producer of Aidan Knight and Said The Whale.

In the 2013 film The F Word, characters Allan and Nicole get married on the Island.

== Timeline ==
- 1787 – Toronto Purchase. The British and the Mississaugas negotiate the purchase of 250,800 acres (101,500 ha) of land north from Toronto Harbour.
- 1793 – Blockhouse built by the Queen's Rangers at Gibraltar Point.
- 1805 – The British and the Mississaugas renegotiate the Toronto Purchase.

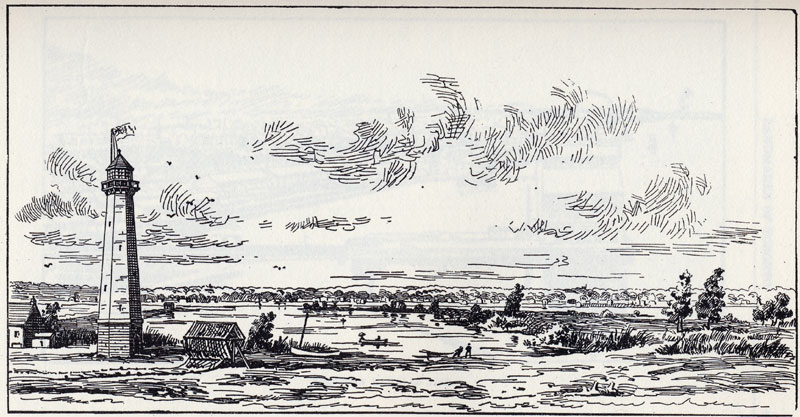
Gibraltar Point Lighthouse was built in 1809 at Gibraltar Point.

- 1809 – Lighthouse constructed at Gibraltar Point.
- 1833 – First hotel "The Retreat on the Peninsula" is opened.
- 1834 – Fisherman David Ward and family, along with shipbuilder John Hanlan and eventual lighthouse keeper James Durnan, are some of the first European settlers on the island.
- 1830–1840 – First island hotels built. Ferry services are started.
- 1850 – Filtration plant on the island starts supplying water to Toronto.
- 1855 – Rower Ned Hanlan born.
- 1858 – Storm separates Toronto Islands from the mainland. Quinn's Hotel and Parkinson's Hotel are destroyed.
- 1867 – Islands become the property of City of Toronto. Lot leases are established.
- 1870–80 – Summer homes established on the island. Cottages from Hanlan's Point to Centre Island.
- 1874 – John Hanlan, father of Ned Hanlan opens Hanlan's Hotel.
- 1879–1912 – Size of islands increased to 563 acres (228 ha) by landfilling. This included the creation of Algonquin Island.
- 1880 – Royal Canadian Yacht Club established on the island.

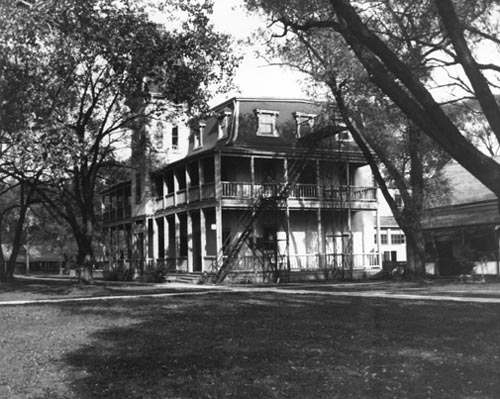
Ward's Hotel, c. 1900. Opened in 1882, the hotel remained in operation until 1966.

- 1882 – William Ward, son of David Ward opens Ward's Hotel; closed 1966.
- 1884 – St. Rita's Roman Catholic Church and St. Andrew by-the-Lake Anglican Church built.
- 1888 – First elementary school is established near the Gibraltar Point Lighthouse.
- 1894 – City Council creates a nude swimming area at Hanlan's Point Beach.
- 1897 – First amusements on Hanlan's Point established by John Hanlan.
- 1897 – Baseball and lacrosse stadium on Hanlan's Point.
- 1899 – First summer colony established on Ward's.
- 1903 – Baseball stadium destroyed by fire and rebuilt.
- 1909 – Hanlan Hotel destroyed by fire.
- 1909 – Baseball stadium again destroyed by fire and rebuilt.
- 1910 – Ferry Trillium enters service to island
- 1913 – First tent city on Ward's Island.
- 1914 – First professional home run of Babe Ruth's career hit at Hanlan's Point Stadium.
- 1916 – Area of Ward's Island doubled through dredging of the harbour.
- 1922 – Tower and top floor of Ward's Hotel removed
- 1926 – Baseball stadium vacated by Toronto Maple Leafs baseball team for a new stadium at foot of Bathurst and Fleet Streets.
- 1930s – Ward's Hotel closes, becomes grocery store and ice cream parlour only.
- 1935 – William Inglis ferry enters service.
- 1937 – Construction of Island airport begins. Some cottages moved east to Algonquin Island.

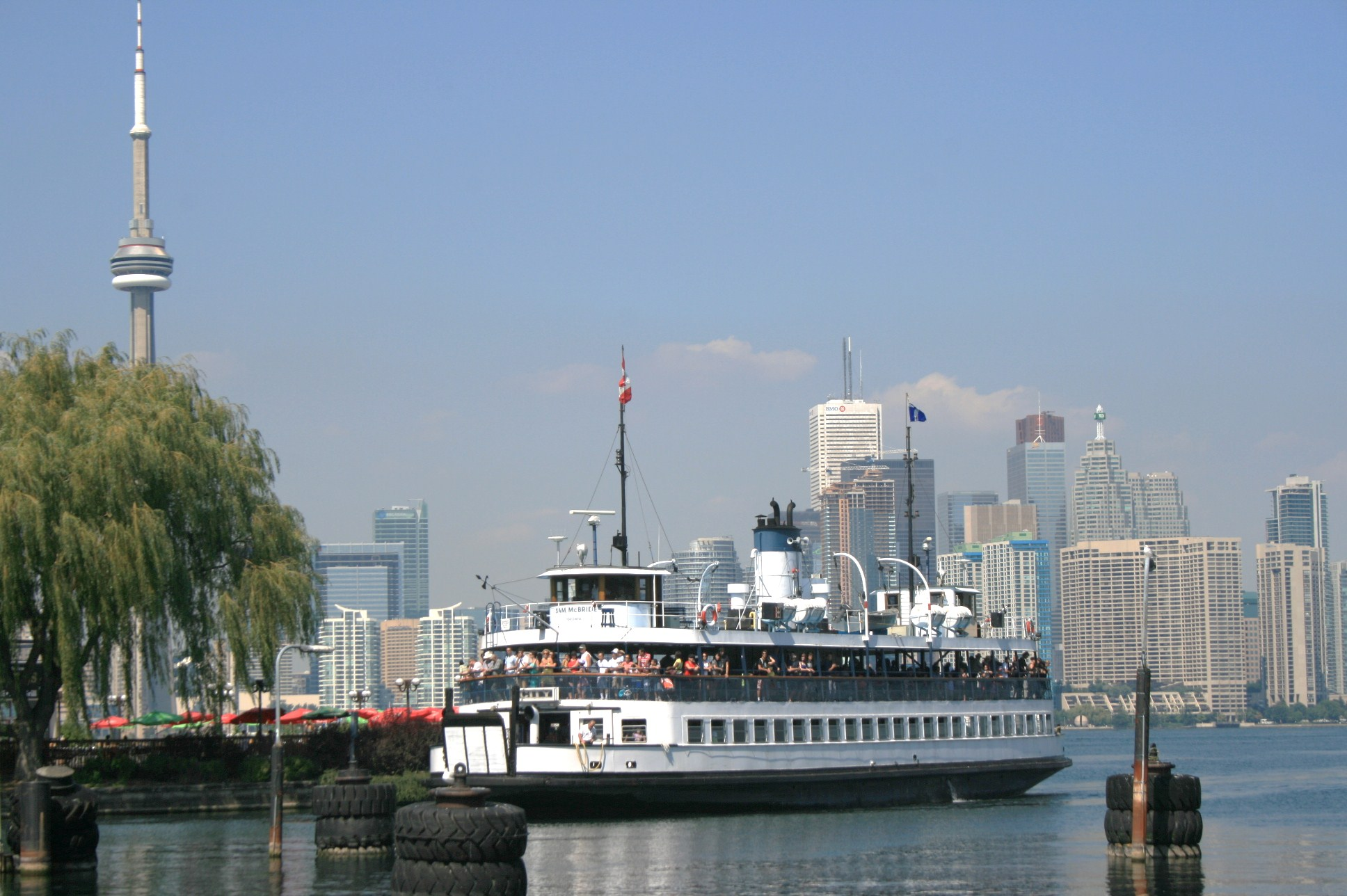
The 16th Toronto Islands ferry, Sam McBride entered service in 1939. It is currently the second oldest ferry operating in the Harbour.

- 1939 – The Sam McBride ferry enters service.
- 1940s – Hanlan’s Point Beach emerges as a well-established queer gathering place, central to the social life of Toronto’s gay and lesbian communities.
- 1947 – City approves year-round residency to cope with a housing shortage brought on by World War II, to expire in 1968.
- 1951 – Island Yacht Club established on Muggs Island. Thomas Rennie ferry enters service.
- 1956 – New Metro Toronto government takes over Island and leases. Starts demolishing cottages.
- 1959 – Far Enough Farm opens.
- 1960s – St. Rita's closes and moves to Ward's Island
- 1965 – Toronto Island Sailing Club opens on Algonquin Island (in old schoolhouse)
- 1966 – Ward's Hotel demolished
- 1967 – Centreville Amusement Park opens.
- 1967 – Toronto Island Marina opens.
- 1970 – Toronto Island Sailing Club moves to Centre Island, NW peninsula (Toronto Island Marina)
- 1970s – St. Rita's demolished
- 1971 – Canada's first Pride, the Gay Day picnic on Sunday, August 1st, takes place at Hanlan's Point Beach.
- 1975–1985 – Canadian Open Frisbee Championships, held at Olympic and Ward's Island. First ultimate games and disc golf competition in Canada.
- 1977–1993 – Supreme Court approves of cancellation of leases by Metro. Remaining residents fight to remain.
- 1984 – Start of scheduled regional airlines at Island airport.
- 1991 – Transfer of cottage lands and lease to City allowing residents to stay.
- 1993 – Passing of the Toronto Islands Residential Community Stewardship Act, 1993, S.O. 1993, c. 15 which gave homeowners a 99-year lease on their properties and established a process for the transfer or sale of ownership.
- 1999 – City Council reestablishes a designated clothing-optional area at Hanlan’s Point Beach, restoring its historic nude bathing status.
- 2010 – Canadian government and Mississaugas settle disagreements over Toronto Purchase
- 2015 – Opening of the island airport pedestrian tunnel.
- 2017 – Water levels reach a record high of 75.919 m above sea level (as of May 26), surpassing the 1973 record of 75.7 m. The Toronto Island Public School, Centreville Amusement Park, and public access to the park west of Ward's Island is suspended until further notice. Most of the Island Parks reopened on July 31, 2017 but the Centreville amusement park did not reopen until the following May. In July 2017, mosquitoes carrying the West Nile virus were found on the islands but the Toronto Public Health Department said that with certain precautions, visitors should not be concerned.
- 2019 – Water levels on Lake Ontario reach a level higher than that which "devastated the Islands in 2017". Sandbags (24,000) and industrial pumps (30) prevent only parts of the islands from flooding. Ferry service to Hanlan's Point was suspended and homes on Algonquin Island faced a risk of flooding.
- 2020 – The islands were closed to visitors starting in early May due to the COVID-19 pandemic in Ontario and ferry service was available only for island residents. The service resumed on June 27 but with 50% capacity per boat, and a maximum of 5,000 visitors per day to the islands.
- 2021 – The City of Toronto launched a new Master Plan initiative to revitalize the public Toronto Island Park area and improve education and commemoration of Indigenous history.
- 2023 – City Council recognizes Hanlan's Point Beach as Canada's oldest extant queer space and the site of the country's first Gay Pride.

Source: Sward 1983

== Notable people ==
- Milton Acorn – Poet
- Elizabeth Amer – Toronto City Councillor
- Peter Gzowski – broadcaster
- Ned Hanlan – Olympic rower
- Paul Henderson – Olympic sailor
- W. A. Hewitt – sports executive and journalist
- Foster Hewitt – sports radio broadcaster
- Patrick Loubert – Producer
- Gwendolyn MacEwen – Poet
- Sam McBride – Toronto mayor
- Terry McLaughlin – Olympic sailor
- John Millen – Olympic sailor
- Mariah Millen – Olympic sailor
- Allan Sparrow – Toronto City Councillor
