= Of the Subcontract =

Book by Nick Thurston

- Author: Nick Thurston
- Language: English
- Genre: Poetry
- Publisher: Information as Material
- Publication date: August 2013
- Publication place: United Kingdom
- Pages: 142
- ISBN: 9781907468186

Of the Subcontract (sometimes titled Of the Subcontract: Or Principles of Poetic Right) is a collection of 100 poems written by a worker subcontracted through Amazon Mechanical Turk. It was published in 2013 by Information as Material, with Nick Thurston as the listed author.

== Content ==
=== Foreword ===
The book contains a foreword ostensibly by McKenzie Wark, though it was actually subcontracted to a ghostwriter in Lahore, Pakistan, for seventy-five dollars via Freelancer.com. In the foreword, the author discusses the positive attributes of both poetry in general and specific poems in Of the Subcontract.

=== Poems ===
The poems are ordered by cost of production, and the book is divided into four sections:

- Artificial Artificial Intelligence
- Benefits of On Demand, Elastic Staffing
- Data Cleansing, Normalization, and Deduplication
- Bellows, Reeds, Levers; Throat, Nose, Mouth

The majority of the poems are about traditional poetic topics, such as love, faith, family, and nature; however, a few of the poems make reference to the author's work as a Mechanical Turk.

=== Afterword ===
The afterword, written by Darren Wershler, describes the use of the Amazon's Mechanical Turk system, especially its history as a platform for creating art.

== Development ==
When developing the project Thurston chose to ask the users at Amazon's Mechanical Turk system to create poetry. The writers were paid US$0.05 per line and "composed his book by arranging them in the order of efficiency (cost vs. poetry produced), along with the metadata documenting their employee-employer exchange."

== Reception ==
Rita Raley of American Book Review reviewed the work, writing that "Of the Subcontract poses questions about the gift economy for the creative industries, wherein a culture of volunteerism disguises the exploitative aspect of unpaid internships and artists are asked to accept the notion of reputation as currency and regard working for free as “opportunity”—“no payment and a rejection are sure to come”—or reduced to busking through PayPal tip jars." Luke Skrebowski of Amodern also covered the book, stating that it "can be read as broaching a moment of Institutional Critique along the lines suggested by Place and Fitterman." At a talk at Avant Canada: Artists, Prophets, Revolutionaries, Christian Bök described Of the Subcontract as "[delegating] the writing of poetry to precarious laborers at Amazon Mechanical Turk, exploring the ethics of outsourcing uncreativity to others."
