= Hal Niedzviecki =

Canadian writer

- Born: January 9, 1971 (age 55); Brockville, Ontario, Canada
- Education: University College, Toronto; Bard College
- Occupations: Novelist; cultural critic

Hal Niedzviecki (born January 9, 1971) is a Canadian novelist and cultural critic. Born in Brockville, he was raised by a Jewish family in Ottawa, Ontario, and Potomac, Maryland, did his undergraduate studies at University College, Toronto, and his postgraduate studies at Bard College. In 1995, he co-founded the magazine Broken Pencil, a guide to underground arts and zine culture, and was the magazine's editor until 2002. He has also written for Adbusters, Utne, The Walrus, This Magazine, Geist, Toronto Life, The Globe and Mail, and the National Post. In 2006, Niedzviecki hosted a summer replacement series, Subcultures, on CBC Radio One.

In 2017, Niedzviecki wrote a piece for Write, the Writers' Union of Canada magazine, where he wrote: "In my opinion, anyone, anywhere, should be encouraged to imagine other peoples, other cultures, other identities" and told writers to try to "Win the Appropriation Prize". After controversy arose over the piece he resigned from the editorial board.

== Work ==
- Concrete Forest: The New Fiction of Urban Canada (1998, anthology)
- Smell It (1998, short fiction)
- Lurvy, A Farmer's Almanac (1999, novel)
- We Want Some Too: Underground Desire and the Reinvention of Mass Culture (2000)
- Ditch (2001, novel)
- The Original Canadian City Dweller's Almanac (2002, with Darren Wershler-Henry)
- Hello, I'm Special: How Individuality Became the New Conformity (2004)
- The Program (2005, novel)
- The Big Book of Pop Culture: A How-to Guide for Young Artists (2006)
- The Peep Diaries: How We're Learning to Love Watching Ourselves and Our Neighbors (City Lights, 2009) ISBN 978-0-87286-499-3.
- Look Down, This Is Where It Must Have Happened (City Lights, 2011) ISBN 978-0-87286-539-6
- Trees on Mars: Our Obsession with the Future, (Seven Stories Press, 2015) ISBN 978-1609806378
