= This Magazine =

Canadian political magazine

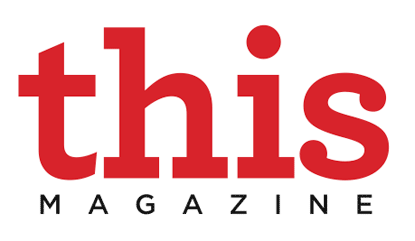
- Editor: Valerie Howes (Interim Editor)
- Art Director: Valerie Thai
- News Editor: Tegwyn Hughes
- Fiction Editor: H Felix Chau Bradley
- Poetry Editor: David Ly
- Arts Editor: Shazia Hafiz Ramji
- Frequency: Bimonthly
- Publisher: Lisa Whittington-Hill
- First issue: April 1966
- Company: Red Maple Foundation
- Country: Canada
- Based in: Toronto
- Language: English
- Website: this.org
- ISSN: 1491-2678

This Magazine is an independent alternative Canadian political magazine.

== History and profile ==
The magazine was launched "by a gang of school activists" in April 1966 as This Magazine Is About Schools, a journal covering political issues in the education system.

During its early years, its editorial offices were located near the University of Toronto in space rented from Campus Co-operative Residences Inc., which in the late 1960s spawned the experimental "free university" Rochdale College. The educational philosophy of Rochdale College was influenced by this association, and by several individuals who published in This Magazine, especially Dennis Lee. The name was shortened to simply This Magazine in 1973, and it gradually expanded its focus to include a wide variety of political, arts and cultural writing from a progressive perspective.

This Magazine is one of Canada's longest-publishing alternative journals. Praised for integrating commentary and investigative reporting with in-depth arts coverage, it has been instrumental in trumpeting the new works of young Canadian writers and artists. This Magazine has introduced the early work of some of Canada's most notable writers, critics and artists.

This Magazine is published bimonthly by the Red Maple Foundation, a registered charity, and receives financial support from the Canada Council for the Arts and the Ontario Arts Council. It is indexed in the Canadian Periodical Index, the Canadian Literary Press Index, Alternative Press Index and the Canadian Magazine Index, and on microfiche and microfilm from University Microfilm, Ann Arbor, Michigan.

The magazine's current editor is Valerie Howes (Interim Editor) and its current publisher is Lisa Whittington-Hill.

Prominent Canadian writers published in This Magazine have included:

- Naomi Klein
- Margaret Atwood
- Dionne Brand
- Tomson Highway
- Evelyn Lau
- Dennis Lee
- Michael Ondaatje
- Rick Salutin
- Stan Persky
- Mel Watkins
- Al Purdy
- Drew Hayden Taylor
- Doug Saunders
- Mark Kingwell
- Sandra Alland
- Linda McQuaig
- Darren Wershler-Henry
- Julie Crysler
- Hal Niedzviecki
- Maggie Helwig
- Leah McLaren
- Marnie Woodrow
- André Alexis
- Stuart Ross
- Phil Hall
- Audra Williams
- J. Kelly Nestruck
- Clive Thompson
- Matthew Hays
