= Island Public/Natural Science School =

Coordinates: 43°36′56.1″N 79°22′43.6″W

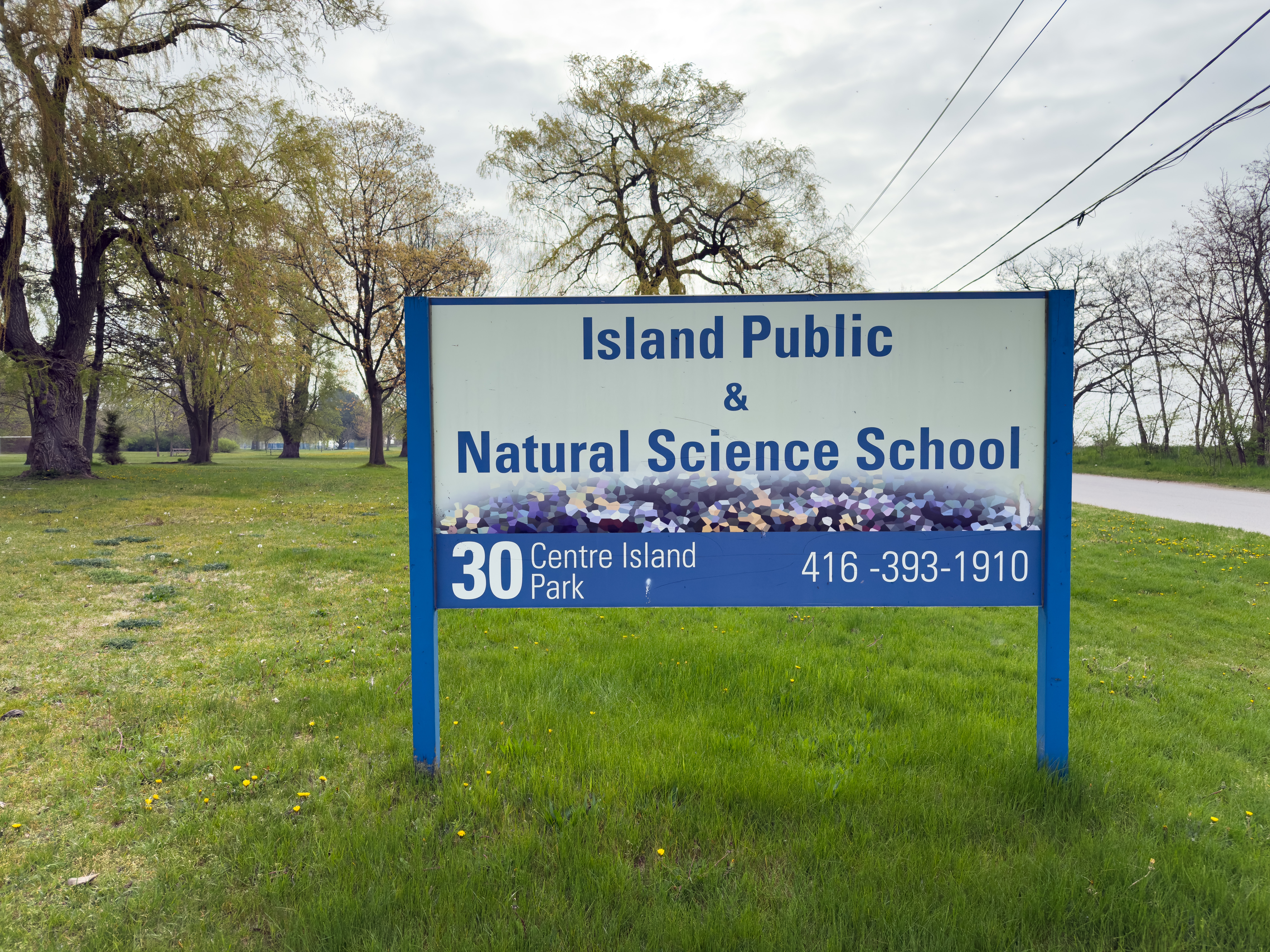

Location
- 30 Centre Island Park; Toronto Islands, Toronto, Ontario, M5J 2E9; Canada

Information
- School type: Public Elementary school
- Established: 1896
- School board: Toronto District School Board (Toronto Board of Education)
- Superintendent: Jennifer Chan
- Area trustee: Alexis Dawson
- School number: 5236 / 278793
- Principal: Kiera Vanderlugt
- Grades: JK-6
- Enrollment: 209 (2022)
- Language: English
- Website: schoolweb.tdsb.on.ca/island/Home.aspx

The Island Public/Natural Science School (also called Island PNSS, IPNSS or Island) is a primary school located on Centre Island in the Toronto Islands in the Old Toronto region of Toronto, Canada. It is operated by the Toronto District School Board (TDSB). Prior to 1998, the Toronto Board of Education (TBE) operated the school.

As of 2013, the school had 179 students. 15% of the student population originated from Algonquin and Ward's islands and about 85% of the students live in the city and take ferry transportation to school. A report in May 2017 stated that "of the 240 students that go to school on the island, only 25 actually live there". In the 2018-2019 school year, there were 264 students, in 11 classes including full-day which includes the Full-day Kindergarten; the curriculum includes Music, Core French, Physical and Health Education, Media Literacy, Dance & Drama and Special Education.

The TDSB also operates a residential, three day (with two overnight stays) natural science Outdoor Ed. program (which began in 1960) on the site, for visiting grade 5 and 6 students and a non-profit day care centre, the Gibraltar Day Nursery, for children ages 2 – 5.

== History ==
The records of the TDSB indicate that a one room school existed on land donated by the city near the Gibraltar Point Lighthouse in approximately 1888 but it was not necessarily open every day, particularly in winter. The school became permanent in 1896, though still with a single teacher. A fire during Victoria Day in the early 1900s destroyed the first school building in the Toronto Islands. Jim Coyle of the Toronto Star wrote that the burning schoolhouse firework "supposedly" originated from this event. In 1954 736 students attended the Toronto Island school. The TBE established the Toronto Island Natural Science School in 1960. The TBE arranged for 5th and 6th grade students from the main area of Toronto to stay at the school's dormitories for one week each, where they had nature-oriented programs. The first principal of the natural science school was Chuck Hopkins. In 1963 the island school had 141 students. 17 classrooms in the island school were used for the natural science program, which was a year-round program.

At some time after 1985 the TBE and Metropolitan Toronto council had a conflict over whether the Toronto Island Public and Natural Science School should be kept in a southwestern section of Centre Island, which was secluded. The school at the time was on a leased area of parkland owned by the Metropolitan government and the Metro Council and the TBE were disputing whether the school should remain there. In 1989 Lynne Ainsworth of the Toronto Star wrote that the Toronto Island School was "in dire need of repair".

On May 16 of 1989 the TBE was scheduled to consider a three-year renovation program for the Toronto Island School and some other schools. In August 1992 Alan Tonks, the chairperson of Metropolitan Toronto, advocated for allowing the school to rebuild in an area near its current site. An October 1992 editorial argued that the Metropolitan Toronto Parks Committee should not try to have the school moved to residential areas on Algonquin or Ward's islands because area students, parents, and teachers believe that the location on the western tip of Toronto Island is "ideal". In November 1992 the Metropolitan Toronto council approved a proposed site for the new Toronto Island School. Robert Bundy, the parks commissioner of the metropolitan government, argued that it would establish a negative precedent for usage of parkland controlled by the metropolitan government.

In 1995 a committee of Metro Toronto council approved a new proposed site, subject to the full Council's approval. That year, Jane Armstrong of the Toronto Star wrote that the Toronto Islands school was "popular". In April of that year the Metropolitan school board approved of the proposed site, which has about 1.5 hectares (3.7 acres) of space. The Toronto Island Public School and the Toronto Island Natural Science School moved into a single new facility on Centre Island on February 1, 1999.

Flooding on the Island in May 2017 required the students to be relocated to Nelson Mandela Park Public School on the mainland for the balance of the school year. While the school itself was not damaged, the ferry docks were affected, leading the city to restrict access to the Island.

The 2014 to 2018 EQAO School and School Board Profiles and Reports for Grade 3 at this school indicated that a high percentage of the students had achieved Provincial level in Reading, Writing and Mathematics.

In May of 2026 Toronto District School Board announced the closure of the school's outdoor education program as part of to budget cuts
