= Darren Wershler =

Canadian writer and cultural critic

Darren Wershler, also known as Darren Wershler-Henry, (b. 1966) is a Canadian experimental poet, non-fiction writer and cultural critic.

Wershler was the senior editor of Coach House Books between 1997 and 2002, where the works he edited included several highly acclaimed books of contemporary innovative poetry, including Fidget by Kenneth Goldsmith (2000), both volumes of Seven Pages Missing, the collected works of Steve McCaffery (2000, 2002), Lip Service by Bruce Andrews (2001), and Eunoia by Christian Bök (2001).

Wershler is the youngest poet discussed in Marjorie Perloff's 21st Century Modernism, which analyzes his second book of poetry, the tapeworm foundry (a Trillium Book Award finalist in 2000). He has instructed courses in Communication Studies at York University and Wilfrid Laurier University and currently is the Concordia University Research Chair in Media and Contemporary Literature (Tier 2) at Concordia University. He has authored several books about the Internet, technology and culture, as well as occasional essays on pop culture for newspapers and magazines such as Brick, Broken Pencil and This Magazine.

He lives in Montreal, Quebec.

== Works ==
=== Poetry ===
- Update (with Bill Kennedy)
- apostrophe (with Bill Kennedy)
- the tapeworm foundry
- NICHOLODEON: a book of lowerglyphs

=== Non-fiction ===
- Guy Maddin's My Winnipeg
- The Iron Whim: A Fragmented History of Typewriting
- The Original Canadian City Dweller's Almanac (with Hal Niedzviecki)
- FREE as in speech and beer: open source, peer-to-peer and the economics of the online revolution
- CommonSpace: Beyond Virtual Community (with Mark Surman)
- Internet Directory 2001 (with Scott Mitchell)
- The Complete Idiot’s Guide to Online Shopping for Canadians (with Preston Gralla)
- Internet Directory 2000 (with Scott Mitchell)

=== Articles ===
- Return From Without: Louis Riel and Liminal Space in Sakolsky, Ron and James Koehnline, Gone to Croatan, Autonomedia, 1993
