= Island Yacht Club =

Coordinates: 43°37′25″N 79°23′12″W

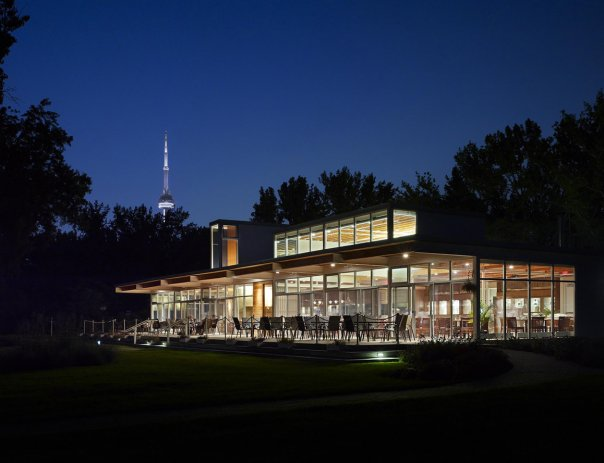
- Clubhouse of the Island Yacht Club
- Abbreviation: IYC
- Formation: 1951
- Type: Yacht club
- Headquarters: Toronto Ontario, Canada
- Official language: English
- Leader: IYC Board of Directors
- Affiliations: Britannia Yacht Club
- Website: www.iyc.ca

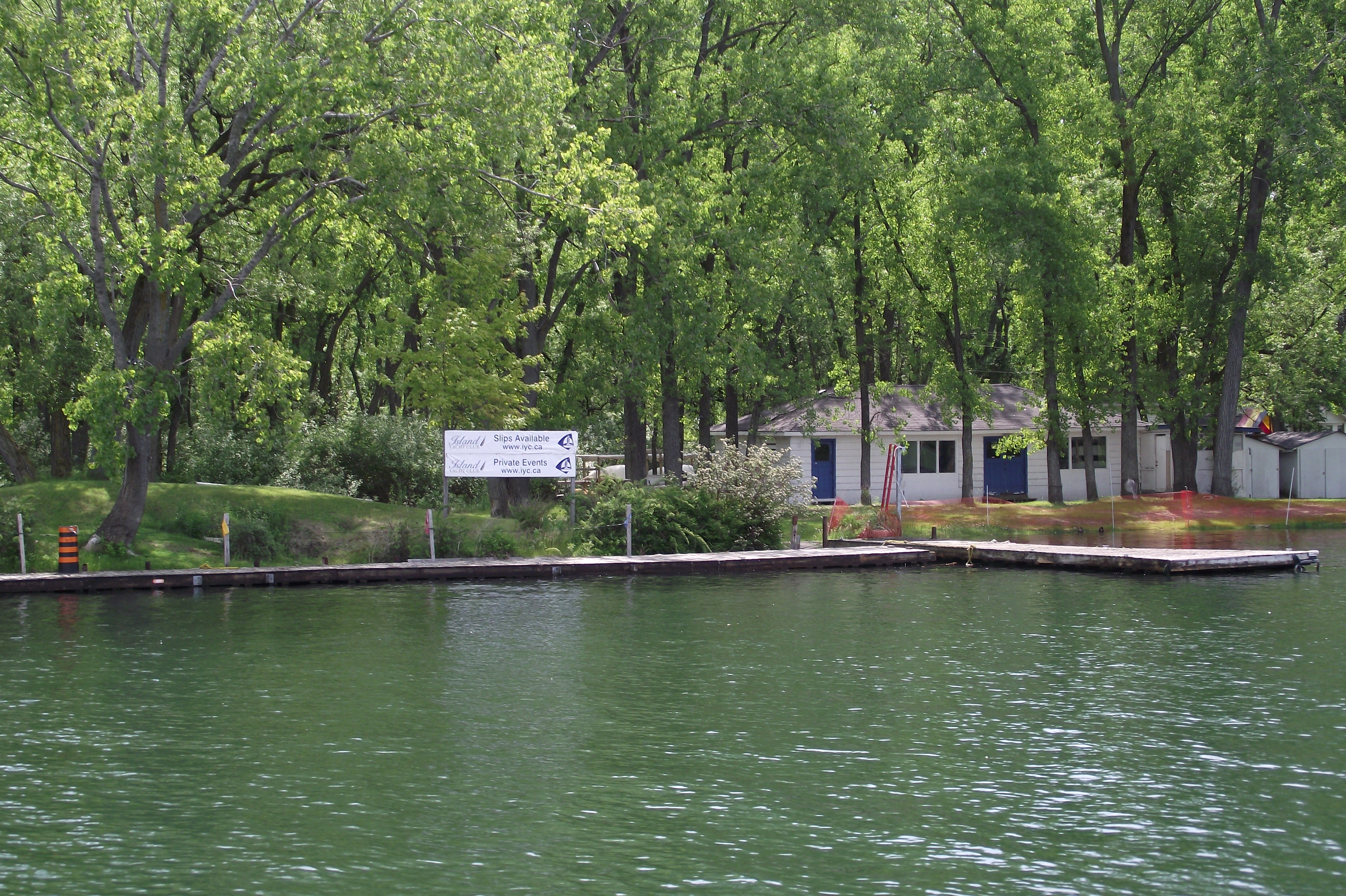
IYC is accessible by water via private club tender.

The Island Yacht Club is a proprietary yacht club in Toronto, Ontario Canada. The club is located on 16 acres (6.5 ha) of land on Mugg's Island, one of the islands in the Toronto Islands. The club is accessible from April to October using the club's private boat from downtown, boarding at Queens Quay for a 10 minute ride to the club. The club has its own marina providing docking and marine services to members. Since 2015, it has been managed by Blockhouse Bay Management Company, per an agreement with the Island Yacht Club, whose members still own the lease.

== Facilities ==
Facilities provided by the club include a clubhouse, tennis courts, nature trail, and pool. Social activities include holiday buffets and barbecues, sailing lessons and camps, family and children's activities. Dockage is available for both power and sailboats. The clubhouse incorporates a dining room, bar, lounge, locker rooms, and a children's club annex. The east side of Mugg's Island is a bird sanctuary.

The 7,600-square-foot (710 m^{2}) clubhouse was designed for "people who would rather be outside" by Montgomery Sisam Architects in 2006. It won the Ontario Association of Architects Design of Excellence. This clubhouse was built to replace the original clubhouse, which burned down in June 2004.

== History ==
The Island Yacht Club was founded in 1951 by a small group of Jewish sailing enthusiasts.

According to an article by Pierre Berton published in Maclean’s Magazine on November 1, 1948: "Segregation by race at which Canadians are apt to look askance when it is practiced in the southern United States, is just as strong in the Canadian social world as it is in the economic world. There are golf clubs which make no bones about the fact that they won’t accept Jewish members, college fraternities and sororities, which exclude Jewish students. Members of these clubs have argued that in private, social organizations they should be allowed to choose the people they associate with."

It was in this social climate that Carl Keyfetz was retained in the spring of 1951 to obtain a Provincial Charter for a Social Club to be located on Mugg’s Island that would be dedicated to the promotion of "yachting, badminton, squash, tennis, bowling, skating, swimming, curling and other games of sport and to arrange matches and competitions of every nature and to offer or grant and contribute towards prizes awards and distinctions".

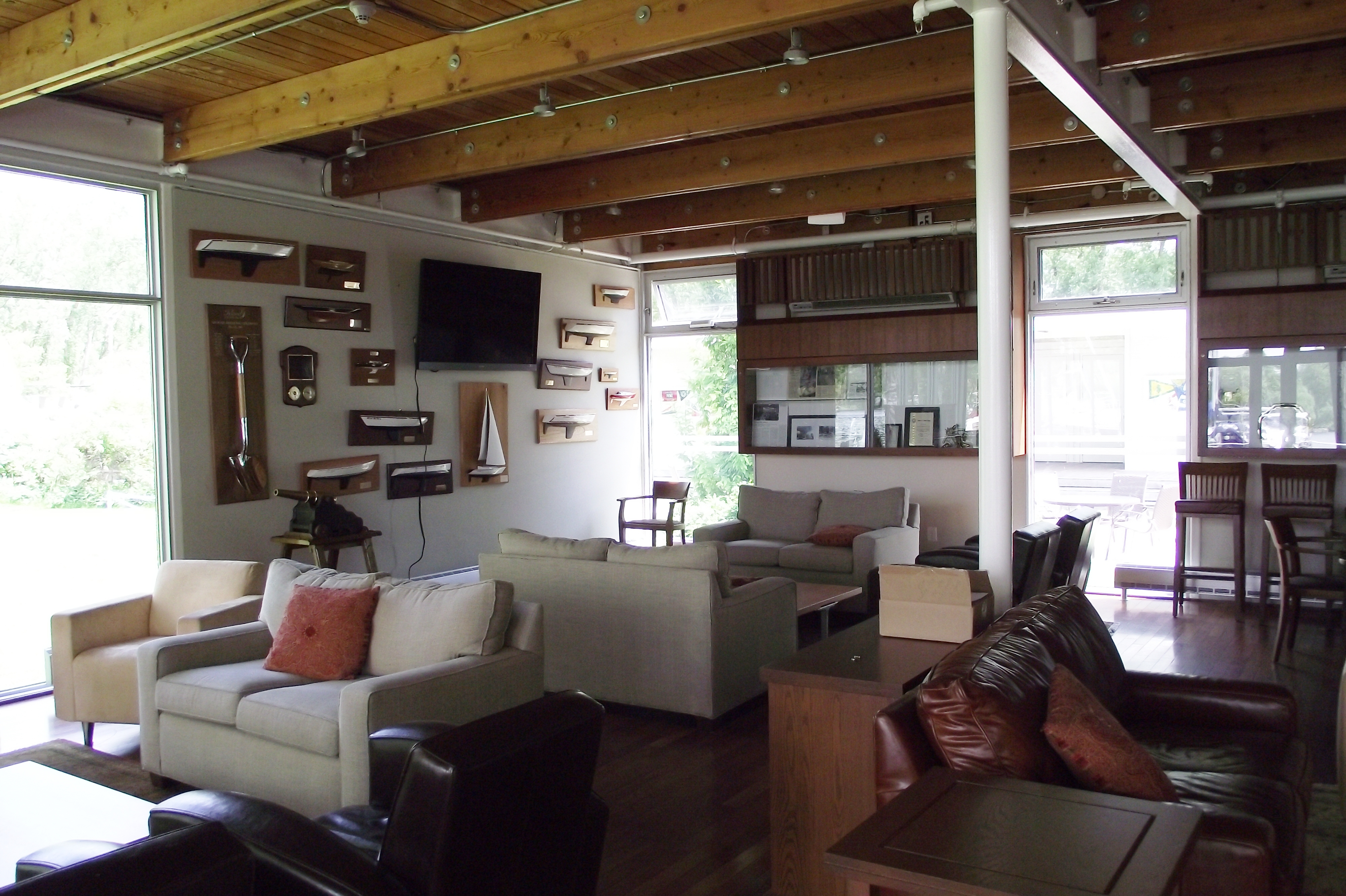
Clubhouse Lounge

A lease for a parcel of land on Muggs Island – 250 feet (76 m) deep by 600 feet (180 m) along the water – was negotiated with the City of Toronto government. On October 16, 1951 an organizing meeting was held at the home of Cecil Yolles with Jack and Estelle Morris, Bill Ackerman, Bob Singer, Dick Lorie, Bert Jacobs, Mel Gould, Eon Gilmore, Norm Kirzner, Leo Perkel, Dr. S. Leibel, Cecil Yolles, Denny Yolles, Dr. Bernard "Bunny" Willinsky, John Bussin, Joe Kitz, Barney Alper, Ben Dunkelman, Irving Gould and Mark Speyer in attendance. The first directors were John Bliss, salesman; Irving and Malville Gould, managers and Carl Keyfetz, solicitor.

Only qualified and proven sailors were to be allowed to fly the IYC burgee. Training was mandatory. A Disciplinary Committee was established under the chairmanship of the Sailing Master with power to penalize, fine or expel members who did not conform with government regulations or any regulations that the club might, from time to time, see fit to pass. With Johnny Bussin responsible for seamanship instruction, Bunny Willinsky sharing his knowledge of boat handling and safety at sea and Irving Gould in charge of navigation and chart work, all members were expected to become qualified skippers so that they would not injure themselves or embarrass the rest of the members or the club. In addition to "fostering sportsmanship and seamanship among Jewish youth and its members", the club was to provide "social facilities to all visiting yachtsmen" and to "foster a better understanding between Jewish and Gentile yachtsmen". The first Commodore of the Island Yacht Club and a major force for the growth of the club was Dr. Bunny Willinsky. Membership peaked at 350 in the 1970s and has steadily dropped since then.

The fundamental issue of whether or not it was to be an exclusively "Jewish yacht club" was addressed and decided quickly. Notwithstanding the way that others had treated them, the answer from the founders was a principled and emphatic "no". At a meeting on February 4, 1952 "upon motion regularly made and seconded, it was unanimously decided that all applications for membership from persons of other than the Jewish faith would be given the same consideration as all other applications." This was a first for private clubs in Toronto and a policy that continues to this day.

The clubhouse was built in 2006 to replace the original clubhouse, which burned down in June 2004. The original clubhouse housed the formal dining room, bar, and cafeteria-style snack bar, where Friday nights were movie night; men's and ladies' locker rooms with saunas and lounges, the Junior Club where young sailors and children of members could relax with their peers and the Sailor's Lounge where you could often find members playing cards or relaxing, either inside the lounge or outside on the deck. Although some of these activities have been discontinued (e.g., movie night) there is an active youth program that helps cement the club as a family-oriented facility. Other adult activities include Weekday Mah Jong, tennis tournaments, adult sail, canoeing, and kayaking.

By 2014, the club was experiencing a decline in membership numbers and severe financial challenges. In 2015 it re-emerged as Spoke on the Water, a division of the proprietary Spoke Club. Several years later, the Spoke Club itself closed.

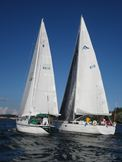
Organized social activities originally included sailboat racing.

== Club features ==
- Social and boating memberships
- Docks for both power and sailboats
- Marine services including secure winter storage
- Sailboats and kayaks for member use
- Four tennis courts
- Heated outdoor swimming pool- with supervised hours
- Men's and women's locker rooms
- Family and children's programs & activities
- Supervised children's playground, arts & crafts house and playhouse
- Casual and gourmet dining and social areas
- Meeting and catering facilities
- Private tender to the club from 539 Queen's Quay W. Toronto
