= Julie Crysler =

Canadian journalist and a published poet

Julie Crysler is a Canadian journalist and a published poet. In 1996 she was voted Montreal's second-best poet. She was the editor of This Magazine from 2000 to 2004, and is currently a producer for CBC Radio One.
