= Broken Pencil =

Canadian magazine

- Former editors: Zack Kotzer; Jonathan Valelly
- Categories: Art, Culture
- Frequency: Quarterly
- Publisher: Hal Niedzviecki; Tara Gordon Flint
- Founder: Hal Niedzviecki
- Founded: 1995
- Final issue Number: Summer 2024; 103
- Country: Canada
- Based in: Toronto, Ontario
- Language: English
- Website: brokenpencil.com
- ISSN: 1201-8996
- OCLC: 427378454

Broken Pencil was a quarterly Canadian magazine based in Toronto, Canada that profiled zine culture and independent arts and music. It was founded in 1995, and it closed in 2024.

== History ==
Broken Pencil was founded in 1995 by Hal Niedzviecki.

In 2009, Broken Pencil published a collection of short stories entitled Can'tLit: Fearless Fiction from Broken Pencil Magazine, featuring Canadian independent writers, with ECW Press. In 2015, the Toronto Star published an article about the first 20 years of Broken Pencil and its role in zine publishing in Canada.

Niedzviecki, who remained the magazine's publisher, shut down Broken Pencil in late 2024, citing criticism of his views on the Israeli–Palestinian conflict. Niedzviecki had received backlash after he made multiple pro-Israel posts on Twitter, culminating in "a petition signed by nearly 200 people, including former editors and contributors, asking him to resign as publisher" of Broken Pencil.

=== Canzine ===
Broken Pencil organized Canzine, a Toronto-based festival centred around zines and small press publications, from 1995 until 2024. The planned 2024 Canzine festivals in Toronto and Ottawa were cancelled, potentially due to a boycott by zine makers in protest of Niedzviecki's pro-Israel stance.
