= Marnie Woodrow =

Canadian comedian and writer and editor (born 1969)

- Born: 1969 (age 56–57); Orillia, Ontario, Canada
- Occupation: Writer
- Writing career
- Genres: Novels, short stories
- Notable works: Spelling Mississippi, Heyday
- Website: www.happyesque.com

Marnie Woodrow (born 1969) is a Canadian comedian and writer and editor. She has also worked as an editor, magazine writer and as a researcher for TV and radio.

Woodrow has published two short fiction collections, Why We Close Our Eyes When We Kiss in 1991 and In the Spice House in 1996, before publishing her debut novel Spelling Mississippi in 2002. Spelling Mississippi was shortlisted for the Amazon.ca First Novel Award in 2003.

Woodrow was mentored in her early writing career by the late Timothy Findley. She has also been a columnist for Xtra!, Toronto's gay and lesbian biweekly newspaper. Her occasional journalism, essays, stories and poetry have appeared in numerous publications including The Globe and Mail, National Post, CV2, Write, NOW, eye weekly and This Magazine.

A former resident of Toronto, she now resides in Barrie, where she writes and performs her thrice-weekly YouTube comedy show, Happyesque with Merna Wolf. A former writing instructor at the University of Toronto School of Continuing Studies, she continues to mentor aspiring writers of all ages.

Her second novel, Heyday, was published in 2015 by Tightrope Books and won the Hamilton Arts Council Fiction prize as well as a Golden Crown Literary Award; it was also short-listed for the Toronto Book Award.
