= Hans Günter Winkler =

German show jumper (1926–2018)

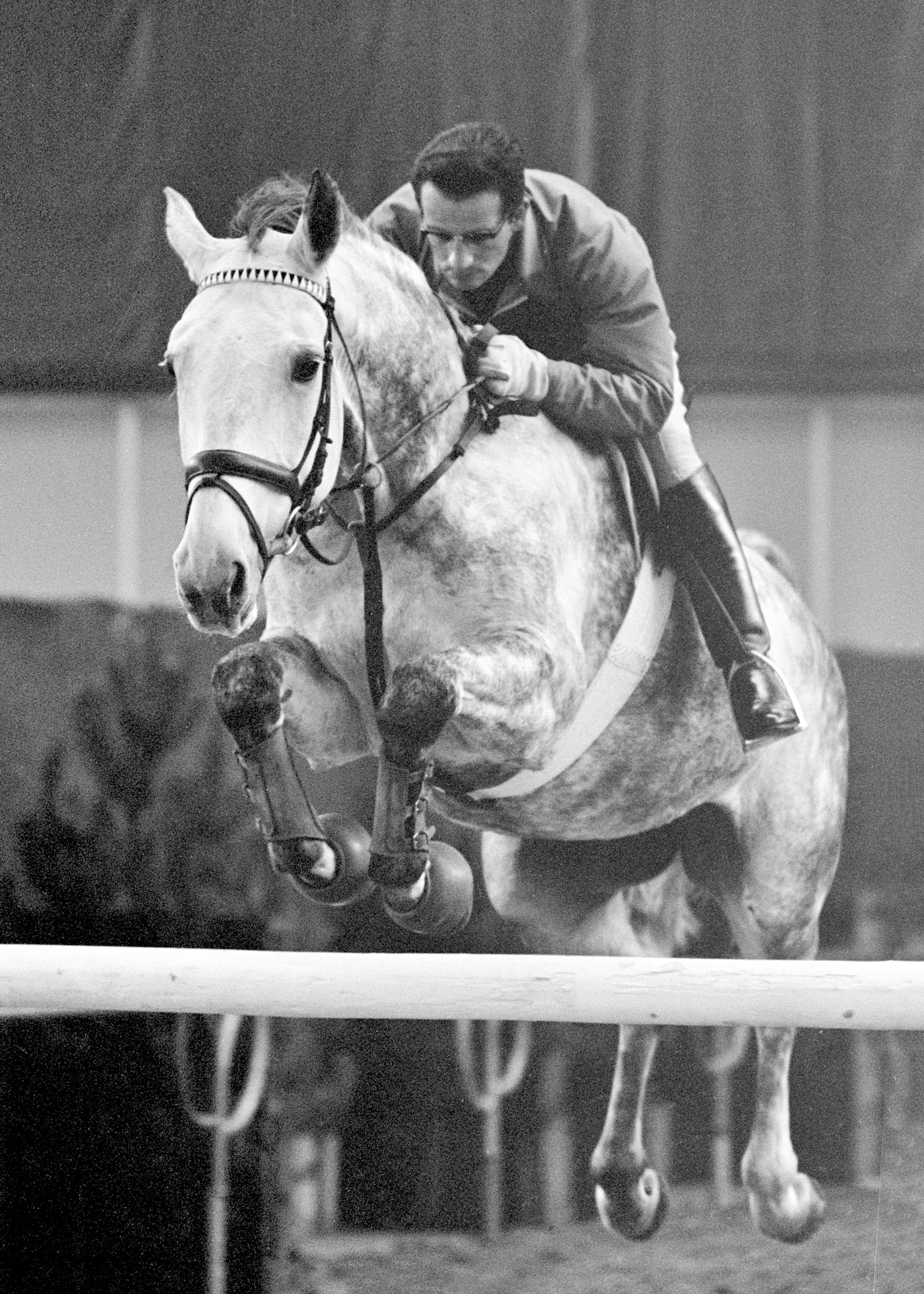
- Winkler in 1966, on Scheila

Personal information
- Born: 24 July 1926 Barmen, Germany
- Died: 9 July 2018 (aged 91) Warendorf, North Rhine-Westphalia, Germany
- Occupation: Equestrian
- Years active: 1948-1986

Sport
- Sport: Horse riding
- Event: Show jumping
Medal record
Equestrian
Olympic Games
Representing Germany
Gold medal – first place	1956 Stockholm	Individual jumping
Gold medal – first place	1956 Stockholm	Team jumping
Gold medal – first place	1960 Rome	Team jumping
Gold medal – first place	1964 Tokyo	Team jumping
Representing West Germany
Gold medal – first place	1972 Munich	Team jumping
Silver medal – second place	1976 Montreal	Team jumping
Bronze medal – third place	1968 Mexico City	Team jumping
World Championships
Gold medal – first place	1954 Madrid	Individual jumping
Gold medal – first place	1955 Aachen	Individual jumping
European Championships
Gold medal – first place	1957 Rotterdam	Individual jumping
Silver medal – second place	1962 London	Individual jumping
Bronze medal – third place	1958 Aachen	Individual jumping
Bronze medal – third place	1961 Aachen	Individual jumping
Bronze medal – third place	1969 Hickstead	Individual jumping

Hans Günter Winkler (German pronunciation: [ˈhans ˈɡʏntɐ ˈvɪŋklɐ]; 24 July 1926 – 9 July 2018) was a German show jumper. He is the only show jumper to have won five Olympic gold medals and a total of seven Olympic medals, and to compete and win medals in six different Olympic Games. In the 1950s and 1960s Winkler was one of Germany's most popular athletes.

== Career ==
Winkler was born in Barmen, today part of Wuppertal, North Rhine-Westphalia, Germany, the son of a riding teacher. His father, Paul Winkler, died as a soldier during the last week of World War II. The boy was drafted as a Flakhelfer and was a prisoner of war for a short time. The house of his mother in Frankfurt was destroyed by bombing. He made money, to support his mother and himself, as a groom in the stable of the Landgravine of Hesse in Kronberg im Taunus. He was also a riding teacher of the Americans who occupied the area. He began an apprenticeship in a textile store in Frankfurt in 1948.

Winkler participated in show jumping competitions and won for the first time on 10 October 1948, in Hünfeld, on Falkner. A new Olympic Committee for Riding (DOKR) was founded in 1949 by Gustav Rau, who moved it to Warendorf. He called Winkler to join in 1950. In the morning, Winkler trained horses for the committee, in the afternoon he worked as a carpenter.

Halla was a horse that the committee intended for eventing. Rau found her unsuitable for the task and called her owner and breeder Gustav Vierling in Darmstadt to take her back. Vierling came and asked Winkler to take care of the mare, which he accepted. The mare became an important part of his equestrian career.

Winkler won his first German championship in 1952, but could not participate in the Olympic Games in Helsinki that year because he was classified as a professional due to his teaching in the 1940s. On an initiative of Willi Daume, he was qualified as an amateur by the end of the same year. Winkler won the World Championship with Halla in 1954, again in 1955, and became one of the favorites for the 1956 Olympic Games. In 1956 the Equestrian Games were held in Stockholm, as the athletes and their horses were not allowed to travel to Melbourne due to quarantine restrictions. In the first round Winkler pulled a groin muscle at the penultimate obstacle after his mare took off early and threw him out of position.

Despite the pain Winkler decided to ride in the second round as the German team would be eliminated without him. After he was given tranquilizers Winkler found that he was comfortable sitting, but riding was difficult and painful. Any drugs that could reduce the pain enough to make him comfortable in the saddle also would reduce his mental capacity, and therefore, he was only given black coffee before his ride to try to help reduce his dizziness and double-vision. Halla apparently sensed that her rider was not right and performed the entire course clear with only steering from Winkler, and their performance won them the individual and team gold.

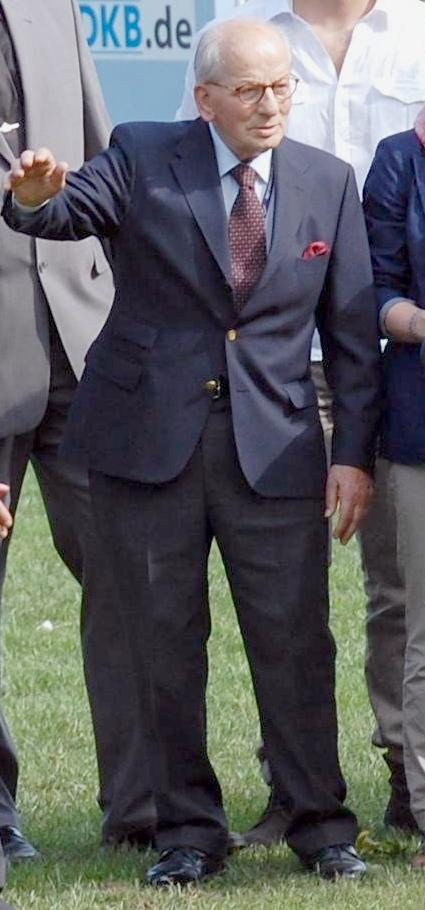
Hans Günter Winkler at the 2012 German show jumping and dressage derby in Hamburg

Winkler won five gold medals in jumping (in addition to the four individual medals with the German team) between 1956 and 1976, as well as a silver medal and a bronze medal. He is one of the most successful German Olympic athletes, third only to Isabell Werth and Reiner Klimke for gold medals produced in German equestrian competition. He was German Sportspersonality of the Year in 1955 and 1956. Winkler retired from jumping on 13 July 1986 with the conclusion of the Aachen tournament. Winkler worked as a trainer for the German Olympic teams, along with Paul Schockemöhle and Herbert Mayer, leading them to success in Seoul in 1988. He consulted companies who wanted to sponsor equestrian sport, organized tournaments, and worked for the development of young riders.

He later published numerous books on riding and in 1991 founded the HGW-Marketinggesellschaft, a sports marketing firm that has helped produce various equestrian competitions. He was also a member of the German Equestrian Federation's Jumping Committee and helped to select the 2000 Olympic Team for Germany. The German Equestrian Federation announced his death in Warendorf on 9 July 2018.

== Awards ==
In May 2000, Winkler was the first recipient of the award, Goldene Sportpyramide, of the Stiftung Deutsche Sporthilfe. On 12 June 2008, he received the Federal Cross of Merit in Warendorf from Ingo Wolf, minister of interior and sport in North Rhine-Westphalia. He also received the media prize Bambi Award.

== Major achievements ==
- Olympic Games
  - 1956 Stockholm: Team gold medal and individual gold medal on Halla
  - 1960 Rome: Team gold medal. Individually finished 5th on Halla
  - 1964 Tokyo: Team gold medal. Individually finished 16th on Fidelitas
  - 1968 Mexico City: Team bronze medal, individually finished 5th on Enigk
  - 1972 Munich: Team gold medal on Torphy
  - 1976 Montreal: Team silver medal, individually finished 10th on Torphy
- World championships
  - 1954 Madrid: Individual gold medal on Halla
  - 1955 Aachen: Individual gold medal on Halla/Orient

== See also ==
- List of athletes with the most appearances at Olympic Games
- List of multiple Olympic gold medalists in one event
- List of multiple Olympic gold medalists

== Publications ==
- Hans Günter Winkler (2007) [1st pub. 1958 as Meine Pferde und ich], Halla, meine Pferde und ich (in German), Warendorf: FN-Verlag der Deutschen Reiterlichen Vereinigung, ISBN 978-3-88542-430-7
- Springreiten (in German), Reinbek: Rowohlt, 1979, ISBN 3-498-07282-X

== Literature ==
- Bryant, Jennifer O. Olympic Equestrian, A Century of International Horse Sport. Lexington, KY: Blood-Horse Publications, 2008
- Ludwig, Dieter: Hans Günter Winkler. – Warendorf : FN-Verl., 1983. – ISBN 3-88542-025-2
- Schröter, Eckhard F.: The happiest place on earth. The life and career of German riders.. Fischer-Taschenbuch-Verlag, Frankfurt a. M. 1980, ISBN 3-596-23019-5
