= European Show Jumping Championships =

Equestrian sporting event

The FEI European Show Jumping Championships is the European Championship for the equestrian discipline of show jumping. First held in 1957 in Rotterdam, and on an annual basis, it is held every two years, in the years between Olympic Games and World Equestrian Games.

Gold, Silver, and bronze medals are awarded in both the individual and, since 1975, team competition. There are also championships held for young riders, juniors, ponies, children and veterans. The most recent edition in 2013 was held as part of a combined FEI European Championship, with dressage and para-dressage.

Both David Broome and Paul Schockemöhle have won the individual title three times. Germany have won the team title seven times, with Great Britain and Switzerland next on five team wins.

== Past winners ==
A European championship for individual show jumping was inaugurated in 1957, featuring only eight riders. Hans Winkler won the first title for West Germany, and West Germany and its successor state Germany have dominated the competition ever since with 14 championship victories.

David Broome of Great Britain was the first rider to win the title twice, and then three times which remains a record. That record was equalled by Paul Schockemöhle who uniquely won three consecutive titles. These two apart, only German Ludger Beerbaum has won the title more than once, with two wins. The competition has been won by 26 different riders. Jos Lansink from the Netherlands, and Michael Whitaker and Harvey Smith have medalled on three occasions without ever winning the competition.

The title has been won, once, by a non-European; in 1966 Nelson Pessoa became the first, and only, South American winner.

Heidi Robbiani was the first female rider to medal in the event, in 1985. Alexandra Ledermann was the first woman to win the title in 1999, a feat equalled by Meredith Michaels-Beerbaum in 2007.

=== Individual results ===
Individual medalists
Year	Location	Gold	Silver	Bronze
1957	(Netherlands) Rotterdam	(West Germany) Hans Günter Winkler on Sonnenglanz	(France) Bernard de Fombelle on Bucéphale	(Italy) Salvatore Oppes on Pagoro
1958	(West Germany) Aachen	(West Germany) Fritz Thiedemann on Meteor	(Italy) Piero D'Inzeo on The Rock	(West Germany) Hans Günter Winkler on Halla
1959	(France) Paris	(Italy) Piero D'Inzeo on Uruguay	(France) Pierre Jonquères d’Oriola on Virtuoso	(West Germany) Fritz Thiedemann on Godewind
1961	(West Germany) Aachen	(United Kingdom) David Broome on Sunsalve	(Italy) Piero D'Inzeo on Pioneer	(West Germany) Hans Günter Winkler on Feuerdorn
1962	(United Kingdom) London	(United Kingdom) David Barker on Mr Softee	(West Germany) Hans Günter Winkler on Romanus	(Italy) Piero D'Inzeo on The Rock
1963	(Italy) Rome	(Italy) Graziano Mancinelli on Rockette	(West Germany) Alwin Schockemöhle on Freiherr	(United Kingdom) Harvey Smith on Warpaint
1965	(West Germany) Aachen	(West Germany) Hermann Schridde on Dozent	(Brazil) Nelson Pessoa on Gran Geste	(West Germany) Alwin Schockemöhle on Exakt
1966	(Switzerland) Lucerne	(Brazil) Nelson Pessoa on Gran Geste	(United States) Frank Chapot on Good Twist	(Argentina) Hugo Miguel Arrambide on Chimbote
1967	(Netherlands) Rotterdam	(United Kingdom) David Broome on Mr Softee	(United Kingdom) Harvey Smith on Harvester	(West Germany) Alwin Schockemöhle on Pesgö
1969	(United Kingdom) Hickstead	(United Kingdom) David Broome on Mr Softee	(West Germany) Alwin Schockemöhle on Donald	(West Germany) Hans Günter Winkler on Enigk
1971	(West Germany) Aachen	(West Germany) Hartwig Steenken on Simona	(United Kingdom) Harvey Smith on Evan Jones	(Switzerland) Paul Weier on Wulf
1973	(United Kingdom) Hickstead	(United Kingdom) Paddy McMahon on Penwood Forge Mill	(West Germany) Alwin Schockemöhle on The Robber	(France) Hubert Parot on Tic
1975	(West Germany) Munich	(West Germany) Alwin Schockemöhle on Warwick	(West Germany) Hartwig Steenken on Erle	(West Germany) Sönke Sönksen on Kwept
1977	(Austria) Vienna	(Netherlands) Johan Heins on Saven Valleys	(Republic of Ireland) Eddie Macken on Kerrygold	(Netherlands) Toon Ebben on Jumbo Design
1979	(Netherlands) Rotterdam	(West Germany) Gerd Wiltfang on Roman	(West Germany) Paul Schockemöhle on Deister	(Austria) Hugo Simon on Gladstone
1981	(West Germany) Munich	(West Germany) Paul Schockemöhle on Deister	(United Kingdom) Malcolm Pyrah on Anglezarke	(Switzerland) Bruno Candrian on Van Gogh
1983	(United Kingdom) Hickstead	(West Germany) Paul Schockemöhle on Deister	(United Kingdom) John Whitaker on Ryans Son	(France) Frédéric Cottier on Flambeau C
1985	(France) Dinard	(West Germany) Paul Schockemöhle on Deister	(Switzerland) Heidi Robbiani on Jessica V	(United Kingdom) John Whitaker on Hopscotch
1987	(Switzerland) St. Gallen	(France) Pierre Durand Jr. on Jappeloup	(United Kingdom) John Whitaker on Milton	(United Kingdom) Nick Skelton on Apollo
1989	(Netherlands) Rotterdam	(United Kingdom) John Whitaker on Milton	(United Kingdom) Michael Whitaker on Mon Santa	(Netherlands) Jos Lansink on Felix
1991	(France) La Baule	(France) Eric Navet on Quito de Baussy	(Germany) Franke Sloothaak on Walzerkönig	(Netherlands) Jos Lansink on Egano
1993	(Spain) Gijón	(Switzerland) Willi Melliger on Quinta	(France) Michel Robert on Miss San Patrignano	(United Kingdom) Michael Whitaker on Midnight Madness
1995	(Switzerland) St. Gallen	(Republic of Ireland) Peter Charles on La Ina	(United Kingdom) Michael Whitaker on Two Step	(Switzerland) Willi Melliger on Calvaro V
1997	(Germany) Mannheim	(Germany) Ludger Beerbaum on Ratina Z	(Austria) Hugo Simon on E.T.	(Switzerland) Willi Melliger on Calvaro V
1999	(United Kingdom) Hickstead	(France) Alexandra Ledermann on Rochet M	(Switzerland) Markus Fuchs on Tinkas Boy	(Switzerland) Lesley McNaught on Dulf
2001	(Netherlands) Arnhem	(Germany) Ludger Beerbaum on Gladdys S	(Belgium) Ludo Philippaerts on Verelst Otterongo	(Sweden) Rolf-Göran Bengtsson on Isovlas Pialotta
2003	(Germany) Donaueschingen	(Germany) Christian Ahlmann on Cöster	(Germany) Ludger Beerbaum on Goldfever	(Germany) Marcus Ehning on For Pleasure
2005	(Italy) San Patrignano	(Germany) Marco Kutscher on Montender	(Switzerland) Christina Liebherr on No Mercy	(Netherlands) Jeroen Dubbeldam on Nassau
2007	(Germany) Mannheim	(Germany) Meredith Michaels-Beerbaum on Shutterfly	(Belgium) Jos Lansink on Al-Kaheel Cavalor Cumano	(Germany) Ludger Beerbaum on Goldfever
2009	(United Kingdom) Windsor	(France) Kevin Staut on Kraque Boom	(Germany) Carsten-Otto Nagel on Corradina	(Netherlands) Albert Zoer on Okidoki
2011	(Spain) Madrid	(Sweden) Rolf-Göran Bengtsson on Ninja	(Germany) Carsten-Otto Nagel on Corradina	(United Kingdom) Nick Skelton on Carlo
2013	(Denmark) Herning	(France) Roger-Yves Bost on Myrtille Paulois	(United Kingdom) Ben Maher on Cella	(United Kingdom) Scott Brash on Sanctos
2015	(Germany) Aachen	(Netherlands) Jeroen Dubbeldam on Zenith	(Belgium) Gregory Wathelet on Conrad	(France) Simon Delestre on Ryan
2017	(Sweden) Gothenburg	(Sweden) Peder Fredricson on All In	(Netherlands) Harrie Smolders on Don	(Republic of Ireland) Cian O'Connor on Good Luck
2019	(Netherlands) Rotterdam	(Switzerland) Martin Fuchs on Clooney	(United Kingdom) Ben Maher on Explosion W	(Belgium) Jos Verlooy on Igor
2021	(Germany) Riesenbeck	(Germany) André Thieme on Chakaria	(Switzerland) Martin Fuchs on Leone Jei	(Sweden) Peder Fredricson on Catch Me Not
2023	(Italy) Milan	(Switzerland) Steve Guerdat on Dynamix de Belheme	(Germany) Philipp Weishaupt on Zineday	(France) Julien Epaillard on Dubai du Cedre
2025	(Spain) A Coruña	(Germany) Richard Vogel on United Touch S	(United Kingdom) Scott Brash on Hello Folie	(Belgium) Gilles Thomas on Ermitage Kalone
2027	(Belgium) Waregem			

=== Team results ===
1975 Munich (FRG) – 6 Teams

1. FRG (West Germany) – (Alwin Schockemöhle, Hartwig Steenken, Sönke Sönksen, Hendrik Snoek) – 35.5 penalties
2. SUI (Switzerland) – (Weier, Gabathuler, Candrian, Friedli) – 94.0
3. FRA (France) – (Rozier, Balanda, Roche, Parot) – 97.0

1977 Vienna (AUT) – 9 Teams

1. NED (Netherlands) – (Wouters, Ebben, Nooren, Heins) – 20.0 penalties
2. GBR (United Kingdom) – (Ricketts, Johnsey, H. Smith, Broome) – 20.25
3. FRG (West Germany) – (Koof, Merkel, P. Schockemöhle, Wiltfang) – 36.0

1979 Rotterdam (NED) – 10 Teams

1. GBR (United Kingdom) – (Pyrah, Ricketts, Bradley, Broome) – 24.70 penalties
2. FRG (West Germany) – (Johannsmann, Luther, P. Schockemöhle, Wiltfang) – 30.95
3. IRL (Republic of Ireland) – (Roche, Gerry Mullins, Con Power, Macken) – 34.10

1981 Munich (FRG) – 9 Teams

1. FRG (West Germany) – (Koof, Luther, Wiltfang, P. Schockemöhle) – 11.86 penalties
2. SUI (Switzerland) – (Melliger, Gabathuler, T. Fuchs, Candrian) – 21.86
3. NED (Netherlands) – (Hendrix, Ehrens, Nooren, Heins) – 26.35

1983 Hickstead (GBR) – 11 Teams

1. SUI (Switzerland) – (Gabathuler, Robbiani, Melliger, T. Fuchs) – 12.19 penalties
2. GBR (United Kingdom) – (H. Smith, Broome, J. Whitaker, Pyrah) – 21.89
3. FRG (West Germany) – (Buchwaldt, Rüping, Wiltfang, P. Schockemöhle) – 24.32

1985 Dinard (FRA) – 8 Teams

1. GBR (United Kingdom) – (Skelton, M. Whitaker, Pyrah, J. Whitaker – 21.56 penalties
2. SUI (Switzerland) – (Guerdat, Robbiani, Gabathuler, Melliger) – 42.08
3. FRG (West Germany) – (Sloothaak, Rüping, Luther, P. Schockemöhle) – 44.75

1987 St. Gallen (SUI) – 8 Teams

1. GBR (United Kingdom) – (Skelton, M. Whitaker, Pyrah, J. Whitaker,) – 10.32 penalties
2. FRA (France) – (Ph. Rozier, Durand, Cottier, Robert) – 35.43
3. SUI (Switzerland) – (Guerdat, M. Fuchs, Gabathuler, Melliger) – 45.01

1989 Rotterdam (NED) – 8 Teams

1. GBR (United Kingdom) – (Skelton, M. Whitaker, J.Turi, J. Whitaker,) – 20.35 penalties
2. FRA (France) – (Godignon, Ph. Rozier, Robert, Durand) – 33.41
3. SUI (Switzerland) – (Gabathuler, M. Fuchs, Melliger, T. Fuchs) – 35.85

1991 La Baule (FRA) – 11 Teams

1. NED (Netherlands) – (Raymakers, Tops, Hendrix, Lansink) – 29.87 penalties
2. GBR (United Kingdom) – (Skelton, M. Whitaker, Broome, J. Whitaker,) – 34.16
3. SUI (Switzerland) – (Melliger, M. Fuchs, Letter, T. Fuchs) – 37.39

1993 Gijón (ESP) – 9 Teams

1. SUI (Switzerland) – (Melliger, McNaught-Mändli, Lauber, T. Fuchs) – 19.23 penalties
2. GBR (United Kingdom) – (Skelton, M. Whitaker, Armstrong, J. Whitaker,) – 21.15
3. FRA (France) – (Bourdy, Robert, Godignon, Navet) – 29.88

1995 St. Gallen (SUI) – 11 Teams

1. SUI (Switzerland) – (Melliger, McNaught, Lauber, M. Fuchs) – 8 penalties
2. GBR (United Kingdom) – (Skelton, M. Whitaker, Bradley, J. Whitaker,) – 12
3. FRA (France) – (H. Godignon, J-M. Bonneau, A. Ledermann, R-Y. Bost) – 16

1997 Mannheim (GER) – 12 Teams

1. GER (Germany) – (L. Nieberg, M. Beerbaum, L. Beerbaum, Merschformann) – 15.75 penalties
2. NED (Netherlands) – (E. Hendrix, B. Romp, J. Tops, J. Lansink) – 21.61
3. GBR (United Kingdom) – (M. Whitaker, G. Billington, R. Smith, J. Whitaker,) – 34.86

1999 Hickstead (GBR) – 14 Teams

1. GER (Germany) – (C-O. Nagel, M. Michaels-Beerbaum, M. Ehning, L. Beerbaum) – 24.13 penalties
2. SUI (Switzerland) – (L. McNaught, M. Fuchs, B. Mändli, W. Melliger) – 25.91
3. NED (Netherlands) – (E. Hendrix, J. Dubbeldam, J. Tops, J. Lansink) – 29.13

2001 Arnhem (NED) – 14 Teams

1. IRL (Republic of Ireland) – (Kevin Babington, Jessica Kürten, Peter Charles, Dermott Lennon) – 34.04 penalties
2. SWE (Sweden) – (M. Baryard, H. Lundbeck, R-G. Bengtsson, P. Eriksson) – 35.19
3. GER (Germany) – (S.Von Rönne, O. Becker, L. Nieberg, L. Beerbaum) – 41.75

2003 Donaueschingen (GER) – 18 Teams

1. GER (Germany) – (Marcus Ehning, Christian Ahlmann, Ludger Beerbaum, Otto Becker) – 15.15 penalties
2. FRA (France) – (Michel Robert, Eric Levallois, Michel Hécart, Reynald Angot) – 25.30
3. SUI (Switzerland) – (Beat Mändli, Steve Guerdat, Markus Fuchs, Willi Melliger) – 28.86

2005 San Patrignano (ITA) – 14 Teams

1. GER (Germany) – (Marcus Ehning, Christian Ahlmann, Marco Kutscher, Meredith M. Beerbaum) – 18 penalties
2. SUI (Switzerland) – (Fabio Crotta, Steve Guerdat, Christina Liebherr, Markus Fuchs) – 34.42
3. NED (Netherlands) – (Gerco Schröder, Leon Thijssen, Jeroen Dubbeldam, Yves Houtackers) – 35.76

2007 Mannheim (GER) – 18 Teams

1. NED (Netherlands) – (Vincent Voorn, Jeroen Dubbeldam, Albert Zoer, Gerco Schröder) – 7.37 penalties
2. GER (Germany) – (Marcus Ehning, Christian Ahlmann, Meredith Michaels-Beerbaum, Ludger Beerbaum) – 9.18
3. GBR (United Kingdom) – (Michael Whitaker, David McPherson, Ellen Whitaker, John Whitaker) – 15.43

2009 Windsor (GBR) – 17 Teams

1. SUI (Switzerland) – (Pius Schwizer, Daniel Etter, Steve Guerdat, Clarissa Crotta) – 27.66 penalties
2. ITA (Italy) – (Juan-Carlos Garcia, Giuseppe d'Onofrio, Natale Chiaudani, Piergiorgio Bucci) – 31.00
3. GER (Germany) – (Marcus Ehning, Carsten-Otto Nagel, Thomas Mühlbauer, Meredith Michaels-Beerbaum) – 31.75

2011 Madrid (ESP) – 9 Teams

1. GER (Germany) – (Marco Kutscher, Carsten-Otto Nagel, Janne Friederike Meyer, Ludger Beerbaum) – 10.41 penalties
2. FRA (France) – (Michel Robert, Pénélope Leprevost, Kevin Staut, Olivier Guillon) – 15.95
3. GBR (United Kingdom) – (Nick Skelton, Guy Williams, Ben Maher, John Whitaker) – 22.46

2013 Herning (DEN) – 19 Teams

1. GBR (United Kingdom) – (Ben Maher, Michael Whitaker, William Funnell, Scott Brash) – 12.18 penalties
2. GER (Germany) – (Daniel Deusser, Carsten-Otto Nagel, Christian Ahlmann, Ludger Beerbaum) – 12.77
3. SWE (Sweden) – (Jens Fredricson, Angelica Augustsson, Henrik von Eckermann, Rolf-Göran Bengtsson) – 13.44

2015 Aachen (GER) – 22 Teams

1. NED (Netherlands) – (Jeroen Dubbeldam, Maikel van der Vleuten, Jur Vrieling, Gerco Schröder) – 8.82 penalties
2. GER (Germany) – (Meredith Michaels-Beerbaum, Christian Ahlmann, Ludger Beerbaum), Daniel Deusser – 12.40
3. SUI (Switzerland) – (Romain Duguet, Martin Fuchs, Janika Sprunger, Paul Estermann) – 18.23

2017 Gothenburg (SWE) - 17 Teams

1. IRE (Republic of Ireland) - (Shane Sweetnam, Bertram Allen, Denis Lynch, Cian O'Connor) - 12.11 penalties
2. SWE (Sweden) - (Henrik von Eckermann, Malin Baryard-Johnsson, Douglas Lindlöw, Peder Fredricson) - 18.21
3. SUI (Switzerland) - (Nadja Peter Steiner, Romain Duguet, Martin Fuchs, Steve Guerdat) - 20.15

2019 Rotterdam (NED) - 15 Teams

1. BEL (Belgium) – (Pieter Devos, Jos Verlooy, Jérôme Guery, Gregory Wathelet) – 12.07 penalties
2. GER (Germany) - (Simone Blum, Christian Ahlmann, Marcus Ehning, Daniel Deusser) - 16.22
3. GBR (United Kingdom) - (Ben Maher, Holly Smith, Amanda Derbyshire, Scott Brash) - 21.41

2021 Riesenbeck (GER) - 15 Teams

1. SUI (Switzerland) – (Elian Baumann, Bryan Balsiger, Martin Fuchs, Steve Guerdat) – 9.47 penalties
2. GER (Germany) – (André Thieme, Marcus Ehning, Christian Kukuk, David Will) – 12.77
3. BEL (Belgium) – (Pieter Devos, Jos Verlooy, Olivier Philippaerts, Nicola Philippaerts) – 17.34

2023 Milan (ITA) - 15 Teams

1. SWE (Sweden) – (Henrik von Eckermann, Wilma Hellström, Jens Fredicson, Rolf-Göran Bengtsson) – 9.51 penalties
2. IRL (Republic of Ireland) - (Michael Duffy, Trevor Breen, Shane Sweetnam, Eoin McMahon) - 18.00
3. AUT (Austria) - (Gerfried Puck, Katharina Rhomberg, Max Kühner, Alessandra Reich) - 22.77

2025 A Coruña (ESP) - 18 Teams

1. BEL (Belgium) – (Nicola Philippaerts, Pieter Devos, Thibeau Spits, Gilles Thomas) – 5.61 penalties
2. GBR (United Kingdom) - (Ben Maher, Matthew Sampson, Donald Whitaker, Scott Brash) - 7.96
3. GER (Germany) - (Marcus Ehning, Sophie Hinners, Christian Kukuk, Richard Vogel) - 8.19
