= Austria at the 2024 Summer Olympics =

- IOC code: AUT
- NOC: Austrian Olympic Committee
- Website: www.olympia.at (in German)

in Paris, France 26 July 2024 – 11 August 2024
- Competitors: 78 (42 men and 36 women) in 21 sports
- Flag bearers (opening): Felix Oschmautz & Michaela Polleres
- Flag bearers (closing): Lukas Mähr & Lara Vadlau
- Medals Ranked 36th: Gold 2 Silver 0 Bronze 3 Total 5

Summer Olympics appearances (overview)
- 1896; 1900; ~~1904~~; 1908; 1912; 1920; 1924; 1928; 1932; 1936; 1948; 1952; 1956; 1960; 1964; 1968; 1972; 1976; 1980; 1984; 1988; 1992; 1996; 2000; 2004; 2008; 2012; 2016; 2020; 2024; 2028

Other related appearances
- 1906 Intercalated Games

Austria competed at the 2024 Summer Olympics in Paris from 26 July to 11 August 2024. It was the nation's twenty-ninth appearance at the Summer Olympics, except for Antwerp 1920, due to the nation's role in World War I.

== Medalists ==
Medal	Name	Sport	Event	Date
Gold	Lara Vadlau; Lukas Mähr	Sailing	Mixed 470	8 August
Gold	Valentin Bontus	Sailing	Men's Formula Kite	9 August
Bronze	Michaela Polleres	Judo	Women's 70 kg	31 July
Bronze	Jakob Schubert	Sport climbing	Men's combined	9 August
Bronze	Jessica Pilz	Sport climbing	Women's combined	10 August

Medals by sport
Sport	1st place, gold medalist(s)	2nd place, silver medalist(s)	3rd place, bronze medalist(s)	Total
Judo	0	0	1	1
Sailing	2	0	0	2
Sport climbing	0	0	2	2
Total	2	0	3	5

Medals by gender
Gender	1st place, gold medalist(s)	2nd place, silver medalist(s)	3rd place, bronze medalist(s)	Total
Male	1	0	1	2
Female	0	0	2	2
Mixed	1	0	0	1
Total	2	0	3	5

Medals by date
Date	1st place, gold medalist(s)	2nd place, silver medalist(s)	3rd place, bronze medalist(s)	Total
31 July	0	0	1	1
8 August	1	0	0	1
9 August	1	0	1	2
10 August	0	0	1	1
Total	2	0	3	5

== Competitors ==
The following is the list of number of competitors in the Games.

Sport	Men	Women	Total
Archery	0	1	1
Artistic swimming	0	2	2
Athletics	4	3	7
Badminton	1	0	1
Canoeing	1	2	3
Cycling	5	4	9
Diving	1	0	1
Equestrian	5	3	8
Golf	1	2	3
Gymnastics	1	1	2
Judo	3	3	6
Rowing	0	3	3
Sailing	5	4	9
Shooting	3	2	5
Sport climbing	1	1	2
Swimming	5	0	5
Table tennis	1	1	2
Taekwondo	0	1	1
Tennis	1	1	2
Triathlon	2	2	4
Volleyball	2	0	2
Total	42	36	78

== Archery ==
For the first time since 2016, one Austrian archer qualified for the women's individual by virtue of top three results at the 2024 European Continental Qualification Tournament in Essen, Germany.

Athlete	Event	Ranking round		Round of 64	Round of 32	Round of 16	Quarterfinals	Semifinals	Final / BM	
Athlete	Event	Score	Seed	Opposition Score	Opposition Score	Opposition Score	Opposition Score	Opposition Score	Opposition Score	Rank
Elisabeth Straka	Women's individual	667	10	Roeffen (NED); L 4–6	Did not advance					

== Artistic swimming ==
Austria fielded a squad of two artistic swimmers to compete in the women's duet by topping the combination of technical and free events at the 2023 European Games in Oświęcim, Poland.

Athlete	Event	Technical routine		Free routine			
Athlete	Event	Points	Rank	Points	Rank	Total (technical + free)	Rank
Anna-Maria Alexandri; Eirini Alexandri	Duet	267.2533	2	288.4145	5	555.6678	4

== Athletics ==
Austrian track and field athletes achieved the entry standards for Paris 2024, either by passing the direct qualifying mark (or time for track and road races) or by world ranking, in the following events (a maximum of 3 athletes each):

Key

- Note–Ranks given for track events are within the athlete's heat only
- Q = Qualified for the next round
- q = Qualified for the next round as a fastest loser or, in field events, by position without achieving the qualifying target
- NR = National record
- N/A = Round not applicable for the event
- Bye = Athlete not required to compete in round

Track & road events

Athlete	Event	Preliminary		Heat		Repechage		Semifinal		Final	
Athlete	Event	Time	Rank	Time	Rank	Time	Rank	Time	Rank	Time	Rank
Markus Fuchs	Men's 100 m	Bye		10.59	8	—N/a		Did not advance			
Raphael Pallitsch	Men's 1500 m	—N/a		3:38.20	11	3:39.32	32	Did not advance			
Enzo Diessl	Men's 110 m hurdles	—N/a		13.63	6	13.56	4	Did not advance			
Susanne Gogl-Walli	Women's 400 m	—N/a		50.67 PB	2 Q	Bye		51.17	7	Did not advance	
Julia Mayer_{[de]}	Women's marathon	—N/a								2:35:14	55

Field events

Athlete	Event	Qualification		Final	
Athlete	Event	Distance	Position	Distance	Position
Lukas Weißhaidinger	Men's discus throw	66.72	3 Q	67.54	5
Victoria Hudson	Women's javelin throw	59.69	20	Did not advance	

== Badminton ==
Austria entered one badminton players into the Olympic tournament based on the re-allocations of unused quota places, through the BWF Race to Paris Rankings.

Athlete	Event	Group stage			Round of 16	Quarter-final	Semi-final	Final / BM	
Athlete	Event	Opposition Score	Opposition Score	Rank	Opposition Score	Opposition Score	Opposition Score	Opposition Score	Rank
Collins-Valentine Filimon	Men's singles	Antonsen (DEN); L (10–21, 18–21)	Dwicahyo (AZE); L (18–21, 11–21)	3	Did not advance				

== Canoeing ==
=== Slalom ===
Austrian entered three boat into the slalom competition, for the Games through the 2023 European Games in Kraków, Poland; 2023 ICF Canoe Slalom World Championships in London, Great Britain; and through the re-allocation of unused African continental spots.

Athlete	Event	Preliminary						Semifinal		Final	
Athlete	Event	Run 1	Rank	Run 2	Rank	Best	Rank	Time	Rank	Time	Rank
Felix Oschmautz	Men's K-1	90.07	15	92.40	16	90.07	18 Q	91.83	4 Q	90.21	10
Corinna Kuhnle	Women's K-1	98.24	11	95.67	8	95.67	8 Q	106.25	12 Q	103.09	10
Viktoria Wolffhardt	Women's C-1	114.27	17	110.39	12	110.39	17 Q	120.78	14	Did not advance	

Kayak cross

Athlete	Event	Time trial		Round 1	Repechage	Heat	Quarterfinal	Semifinal	Final	
Athlete	Event	Time	Rank	Position	Position	Position	Position	Position	Position	Rank
Felix Oschmautz	Men's KX-1	67.87	7	1 Q	Bye	3	Did not advance			17
Corinna Kuhnle	Women's KX-1	76.55	22	4 R	3	Did not advance				33
Viktoria Wolffhardt	Women's KX-1	80.83	32	3 R	2 Q	4	Did not advance			31

== Cycling ==
=== Road ===
Austria entered four road cyclists (two male and two female). Austria qualified two male and two female through the UCI Nation Ranking and 2023 World Championships in Glasgow, Great Britain.

Men

Athlete	Event	Time	Rank
Felix Großschartner	Road race	6:21.54	26
Marco Haller	Road race	6:20.50	6
Felix Großschartner	Time trial	38:17.36	19

Women

Athlete	Event	Time	Rank
Anna Kiesenhofer	Road race	4:07:16	52
Christina Schweinberger	Road race	4:04.23	28
Anna Kiesenhofer	Time trial	46:28.88	33
Christina Schweinberger	Time trial	41:52.02	10

=== Track ===
Austria entered two riders for men's omnium and madison events, based on the nations performances, through the final UCI Olympic rankings.

Omnium

Athlete	Event	Scratch race		Tempo race		Elimination race		Points race		Total	
Athlete	Event	Rank	Points	Rank	Points	Rank	Points	Rank	Points	Rank	Points
Tim Wafler	Men's omnium	13	16	16	0	19	4	8	25	13	55

Madison

Athlete	Event	Points	Laps	Rank
Maximilian Schmidbauer; Tim Wafler	Men's madison	5	−60	14

=== Mountain biking ===
Austrian mountain bikers secured one men's and two women's quota places in the Olympic through the release of the final Olympic mountain biking rankings.

Athlete	Event	Time	Rank
Maximilian Foidl	Men's cross-country	1:31:26	22
Mona Mitterwallner	Women's cross-country	1:34:44	18
Laura Stigger	Women's cross-country	1:30:15	6

== Diving ==
Austria entered one diver, Anton Knoll, into the Olympic competition.

Athlete	Event	Preliminary		Semifinal		Final	
Athlete	Event	Points	Rank	Points	Rank	Points	Rank
Anton Knoll	Men's 10 m platform	321.55	23	Did not advance			

== Equestrian ==
Austria entered a squad of three jumping riders, three dressage riders and one eventing rider into the Olympic equestrian competition by securing the first of two available team spots at the 2023 European Jumping Championships in Milan, Italy for Group A and Group B for jumping competition; become one of three highest eligible nations at the 2023 European Dressage Championships in Riesenbeck, Germany and secured one of two available spots for Group B (South Western Europe), through the establishments of final eventing olympics ranking. In the eventing, Austria received a last minute second individual spot, because of some withdrawals from other qualified countries.

=== Dressage ===
Athlete	Horse	Event	Grand Prix		Grand Prix Special		Grand Prix Freestyle	
Athlete	Horse	Event	Score	Rank	Score	Rank	Technical	Artistic
Victoria Max-Theurer	Abegglen FH	Individual	74.301	14 Q	—N/a	—N/a	75.375	17
Stefan Lehfellner	Roberto Carlos MT	Individual	68.183	45	Did not advance			
Florian Bacher	Fidertraum	Individual	71.009	26	Did not advance			
Victoria Max-Theurer; Stefan Lehfellner; Florian Bacher	See above	Team	213.493	8 Q	211.505	9	—N/a	

Qualification Legend: Q = Qualified for the final; q = Qualified for the final as a lucky loser
TF = Substituted for the team final

=== Eventing ===
Athlete	Horse	Event	Dressage		Cross-country			Jumping						Total	
Athlete	Horse	Event	Dressage		Cross-country			Qualifier			Final			Total	
Athlete	Horse	Event	Penalties	Rank	Penalties	Total	Rank	Penalties	Total	Rank	Penalties	Total	Rank	Penalties	Rank
Harald Ambros	Vitorio du Montet	Individual	36.50	49	6.80	43.30	33	10.00	53.30	34	Did not advance			53.30	34

=== Jumping ===
Athlete	Horse	Event	Qualification			Final		
Athlete	Horse	Event	Penalties	Time	Rank	Penalties	Time	Rank
Gerfried Puck	Naxcel V	Individual	12.00	77.34	55	Did not advance		
Max Kühner	Elektric Blue P	Individual	4.00	73.04	22 Q	4.00	81.29	7
Katharina Rhomberg	Cuma 5	Individual	4.00	75.55	32	Did not advance		
Gerfried Puck; Max Kühner; Katharina Rhomberg	See above	Team	28	—N/a	13	Did not advance		

== Golf ==
Austria entered two golfers into the Olympic tournament. Sepp Straka, Emma Spitz and Sarah Schober qualified for the games, based on their own position inside the top 60 eligible players on the IGF World Rankings.

Athlete	Event	Round 1	Round 2	Round 3	Round 4	Total		
Athlete	Event	Score	Score	Score	Score	Score	Par	Rank
Sepp Straka	Men's	67	74	70	71	282	−2	T35
Emma Spitz	Women's	75	70	75	70	290	+2	T29
Sarah Schober	Women's	75	73	73	79	300	+12	T47

== Gymnastics ==
=== Artistic ===
Austria entered one gymnast to compete at the games. Charlize Moerz secured a quota place by virtue of becoming one of the highest eligible gymnast in women's floor, not yet qualified, through the final ranking of 2024 FIG Artistic Gymnastics World Cup series.

Women

Athlete	Event	Qualification						Final					
Athlete	Event	Apparatus				Total	Rank	Apparatus				Total	Rank
Athlete	Event	V	UB	BB	F	Total	Rank	V	UB	BB	F	Total	Rank
Charlize Moerz	All-around	12.5	11.766	11.1	11.733	47.099	57	Did not advance					

=== Trampoline ===
Austria qualified a gymnast for the men's trampoline by finishing in the top five eligible nation's at the 2023 World Championships in Birmingham, United Kingdom.

Athlete	Event	Qualification		Final	
Athlete	Event	Score	Rank	Score	Rank
Benny Wizani	Men's	54.990	15	Did not advance	

== Judo ==
Four Austrian judokas qualified directly via the IJF Olympics rankings. Katharina Tanzer received a European continental quota place. By qualifying in the corresponding weight classes, Austria received an additional invitation quota to compete in the mixed team. Despite qualifying, Shamil Borchashvili declined to be nominated, meaning his brother Wachid Borchashvili moved up.

Athlete	Event	Round of 64	Round of 32	Round of 16	Quarterfinals	Semifinals	Repechage	Final / BM	
Athlete	Event	Opposition Result	Opposition Result	Opposition Result	Opposition Result	Opposition Result	Opposition Result	Opposition Result	Rank
Samuel Gaßner	Men's −73 kg	—N/a	Bayan (SYR); W 10-00	Gjakova (KOS) L 00-10	Did not advance				9
Wachid Borchashvili	Men's −81 kg	Bye	Faizad (AFG); W 11-00	Grigalashvili (GEO) L 00-0	Did not advance				9
Aaron Fara	Men's −100 kg	—N/a	Wolf (JPN); L 00–10	Did not advance					
Katharina Tanzer	Women's −48 kg	—N/a	Wong KL (HKG); W 10–00	Bavuudorjiin (MGL); L 00–10	Did not advance				9
Lubjana Piovesana	Women's −63 kg	—N/a	Kujulowa (KAZ); W 01-00	Renshall (GBR) W 01-00	Awiti Alcaraz (MEX) L 00-01	N/A	Kim (KOR) W 10-00	Agbegnenou (FRA) L 00-10	5
Michaela Polleres	Women's −70 kg	—N/a	Bye	Yeats Brown (GBR) W 01-00	Gahie (FRA) W 10-00	Butkereit (GER) L 00-10	N/A	Tsunoda Roustant (ESP) W 10-00	3rd place, bronze medalist(s)

Mixed

Athletes	Event	Round of 32	Round of 16	Quarterfinals	Semifinals	Repechage	Final / BM	
Athletes	Event	Opposition Result	Opposition Result	Opposition Result	Opposition Result	Opposition Result	Opposition Result	Rank
Samuel Gaßner; Wachid Borchashvili; Aaron Fara; Katharina Tanzer; Lubjana Piovesana; Michaela Polleres	Team	Germany (GER); L 01-04	Did not advance					9

== Rowing ==
Austrian rowers qualified boats in the following classes through the 2023 World Rowing Championships in Belgrade, Serbia; and through the 2024 European Qualification Regatta in Szeged, Hungary.

Athlete	Event	Heats		Repechage		Quarterfinals		Semifinals		Final	
Athlete	Event	Time	Rank	Time	Rank	Time	Rank	Time	Rank	Time	Rank
Magdalena Lobnig	Women's single sculls	7:39.39	2 QF	Bye		7:40.07	3 SA/B	7:40.02	6 FB	7:30.54	10
Louisa Altenhuber; Lara Tiefenthaler	Women's lightweight double sculls	7:24.14	4 R	7:17.77	2 SA/B	—N/a		7:19.70	5 FB	7:10.02	10

Qualification Legend: FA=Final A (medal); FB=Final B (non-medal); FC=Final C (non-medal); FD=Final D (non-medal); FE=Final E (non-medal); FF=Final F (non-medal); SA/B=Semifinals A/B; SC/D=Semifinals C/D; SE/F=Semifinals E/F; QF=Quarterfinals; R=Repechage

== Sailing ==
Austrian sailors qualified one boat in each of the following classes through the 2023 Sailing World Championships in The Hague, Netherlands and the 2023 Nacra 17 European Championship in Vilamoura, Portugal.

Elimination events

Athlete	Event	Opening series																						Quarterfinal	Semifinal								Final							
Athlete	Event	1	2	3	4	5	6	7	8	9	10	11	12	13	14	15	16	17	18	19	20	Net points	Rank	Rank	1	2	3	4	5	6	Total	Rank	1	2	3	4	5	6	Total	Rank
Valentin Bontus	Men's Formula Kite	1	2	5	8	4	~~21~~	~~20~~	cancelled									—N/a				20	4	—N/a	1	Qualify to final					3	1	1	1	1	Bye			3	1st place, gold medalist(s)
Lorena Abicht	Women's IQFoil	10	18	22	~~25~~	22	23	~~25~~	24	22	22	21	11	25	20	Cancelled						240	23	Did not advance																23
Alina Kornelli	Women's Formula Kite	~~16~~	12	13	9	8	5	Cancelled										—N/a				47	11	—N/a	Did not advance															11

Medal race events

Athlete	Event	Race													Net points	Final rank
Athlete	Event	1	2	3	4	5	6	7	8	9	10	11	12	M*	Net points	Final rank
Benjamin Bildstein; David Hussl	Men's 49er	3	5	9	11	13	17	17	~~19~~	6	16	15	10	EL	122	14
Lara Vadlau; Lukas Mähr	Mixed 470	~~20~~	5	3	1	7	1	5	2	cancelled		—N/a		14	38	1st place, gold medalist(s)
Lukas Haberl; Tanja Frank	Mixed Nacra 17	~~16~~	12	14	15	16	15	15	3	8	9	10	16	EL	133	15

M = Medal race; EL = Eliminated – Did not advance into the medal race

== Shooting ==
Austrian shooters achieved quota places for the following events based on their results at the 2022 and 2023 ISSF World Championships, 2022, 2023, and 2024 European Championships, 2023 European Games, and 2024 ISSF World Olympic Qualification Tournament.

Athlete	Event	Qualification		Semifinal		Final	
Athlete	Event	Points	Rank	Points	Rank	Points	Rank
Alexander Schmirl	Men's 10 m air rifle	627.7	26	—N/a		Did not advance	
Martin Strempfl	Men's 10 m air rifle	627.2	28	—N/a		Did not advance	
Alexander Schmirl	Men's 50 m rifle 3 positions	585-26x	28	Did not advance			
Andreas Thum	Men's 50 m rifle 3 positions	280-24x	35	Did not advance			
Nadine Ungerank	Women's 10 m air rifle	626.1	28	—N/a		Did not advance	
Nadine Ungerank	Women's 50 m rifle 3 positions	589-27x	7 Q	—N/a		432.1	5
Sylvia Steiner	Women's 25 m pistol	581	17	Did not advance			
Sylvia Steiner	Women's 10 m air pistol	569	27	Did not advance			
Nadine Ungerank; Martin Strempfl	Mixed 10 m air rifle team	625.5	15	—N/a		Did not advance	

== Sport climbing ==
Austria entered two sport climbers into the Olympic tournament. Jakob Schubert and Jessica Pilz qualified directly for the men's and women's boulder and lead combined event, by winning the gold and silver medal and securing one of the three berths available at the 2023 IFSC World Championships in Bern, Switzerland.

Boulder & lead combined

Athlete	Event	Qualification						Final					
Athlete	Event	Boulder		Lead		Total	Rank	Boulder		Lead		Total	Rank
Athlete	Event	Result	Place	Result	Place	Total	Rank	Result	Place	Result	Place	Total	Rank
Jakob Schubert	Men's	48.7	6	54.1	6	98.8	5 Q	43.6	5	96.0	1	139.6	3rd place, bronze medalist(s)
Jessica Pilz	Women's	68.8	6	88.1	3	156.9	2 Q	59.3	6	88.1	2	147.4	3rd place, bronze medalist(s)

== Swimming ==
Austrian swimmers achieved the entry standards in the following events for Paris 2024 (a maximum of two swimmers under the Olympic Qualifying Time (OST) and potentially at the Olympic Consideration Time (OCT)):

Athlete	Event	Heat		Semifinal		Final	
Athlete	Event	Time	Rank	Time	Rank	Time	Rank
Felix Auböck	Men's 200 m freestyle	DNS		Did not advance			
Felix Auböck	Men's 400 m freestyle	3:50.50	24	Did not advance			
Felix Auböck	Men's 800 m freestyle	7:48.49	13	—N/a		Did not advance	
Felix Auböck	Men's 10 km open water	—N/a				2:03:00.5	24
Bernhard Reitshammer	Men's 100 m backstroke	55.13	36	Did not advance			
Bernhard Reitshammer	Men's 100 m breaststroke	59.68	11 Q	1:00.18	15	Did not advance	
Simon Bucher	Men's 100 m butterfly	51.55	13 Q	51.35	10	Did not advance	
Martin Espernberger	Men's 200 m butterfly	1:55.19	5 Q	1:54.62	8 Q	1:54.17 NR	6
Jan Hercog	Men's 10 km open water	—N/a				2:01:03.8	21

== Table tennis ==
Austria entered two table tennis players into Paris 2024. Daniel Habesohn and Sofia Polcanova qualified for the games by being nominated into top twelve ranked players, in their respective classes, through the final release of the world ranking.

Athlete	Event	Preliminary	Round of 64	Round of 32	Round of 16	Quarterfinals	Semifinals	Final / BM	
Athlete	Event	Opposition Result	Opposition Result	Opposition Result	Opposition Result	Opposition Result	Opposition Result	Opposition Result	Rank
Daniel Habesohn	Men's singles	Bye	Robles (ESP); L 2–4	Did not advance					
Sofia Polcanova	Women's singles	Bye	Cossío (MEX); W 4–0	Shao (POR); W 4–2	Szőcs (ROU); W 4–0	Chen (CHN); L 0–4	Did not advance		

== Taekwondo ==
For the first time since 2004, Austria qualified one athlete to compete at the games. Marlene Jahl secured her spot through the re-allocations of Individual Neutral Athletes quotas, in her own division, at the 2024 European Taekwondo Olympic Qualification Tournament, in Sofia, Bulgaria

Athlete	Event	Qualification	Round of 16	Quarterfinals	Semifinals	Repechage	Final / BM	
Athlete	Event	Opposition Result	Opposition Result	Opposition Result	Opposition Result	Opposition Result	Opposition Result	Rank
Marlene Jahl	Women's +67 kg	—N/a	Zhou (CHN); L 0–2	Did not advance				

== Tennis ==
Austria entered two tennis players into the Olympic tournament. Sebastian Ofner and Julia Grabher qualified directly for the men's and women's singles as the top 56 eligible players in the World Rankings as of 10 June 2024.

Athlete	Event	Round of 64	Round of 32	Round of 16	Quarterfinals	Semifinals	Final / BM	
Athlete	Event	Opposition Result	Opposition Result	Opposition Result	Opposition Result	Opposition Result	Opposition Result	Rank
Sebastian Ofner	Men's singles	Haase (NED); W 7–5, 6–2	Medvedev (AIN); L 2–6, 2–6	Did not advance				
Julia Grabher	Women's singles	Navarro (USA); L 2–6, 0–6	Did not advance					

== Triathlon ==
Austria entered four triathletes (two per gender) in the triathlon events for Paris, following the release of final individual olympics qualification ranking.

Individual

Athlete	Event	Time						Rank
Athlete	Event	Swim (1.5 km)	Trans 1	Bike (40 km)	Trans 2	Run (10 km)	Total	Rank
Tjebbe Kaindl	Men's	21:21	0:47	51:18	0:27	35:08	1:49:01	33
Alois Knabl	Men's	20:33	0:54	51:57	0:26	32:33	1:46:23	23
Julia Hauser	Women's	24:41	0:57	1:00:39	0:32	34:55	2:01:44	32
Lisa Perterer	Women's	27:52	1:03	1:00:16	0:35	37:41	2:07:27	50

Relay

Athlete	Event	Time						Rank
Athlete	Event	Swim (300 m)	Trans 1	Bike (7 km)	Trans 2	Run (2 km)	Total group	Rank
Alois Knabl	Mixed relay	4:10	1:07	9:37	0:24	5:19	20:37	—N/a
Julia Hauser	Mixed relay	5:36	1:18	11:49	0:30	6:14	25:27	—N/a
Tjebbe Kaindl	Mixed relay	5:02	1:06	10:15	0:24	5:37	22:24	—N/a
Lisa Perterer	Mixed relay	6:01	DNF					—N/a
Total	Mixed relay	—N/a					DNF	15

== Volleyball ==
=== Beach ===
For the first time since 2016, Austrian men's pair qualified for Paris based on the FIVB Beach Volleyball Olympic Ranking.

Athletes	Event	Preliminary round				Round of 16	Quarterfinal	Semifinal	Final / BM	
Athletes	Event	Opposition Score	Opposition Score	Opposition Score	Rank	Opposition Score	Opposition Score	Opposition Score	Opposition Score	Rank
Julian Hörl; Alexander Horst	Men's	Evandro / Arthur (BRA); L 0–2	Perušič / Schweiner (CZE); L 0–2	Schachter / Dearing (CAN); L 0–2	4	Did not advance				19
