= Paddy McMahon (equestrian) =

British equestrian (1933–2021)

Medal record

Equestrian

European Championships
Gold medal – first place	1973 Hickstead	Individual jumping

Patrick McMahon (5 December 1933 – 4 April 2021) was a British show jumping champion.

McMahon was born in Derby. He won the European Show Jumping Championships in 1973 on Penwood Forge Mill, beating German Alwin Schockemöhle. In the same year he was voted in third place for the BBC Sports Personality of the Year Award.
