= Deister (horse) =

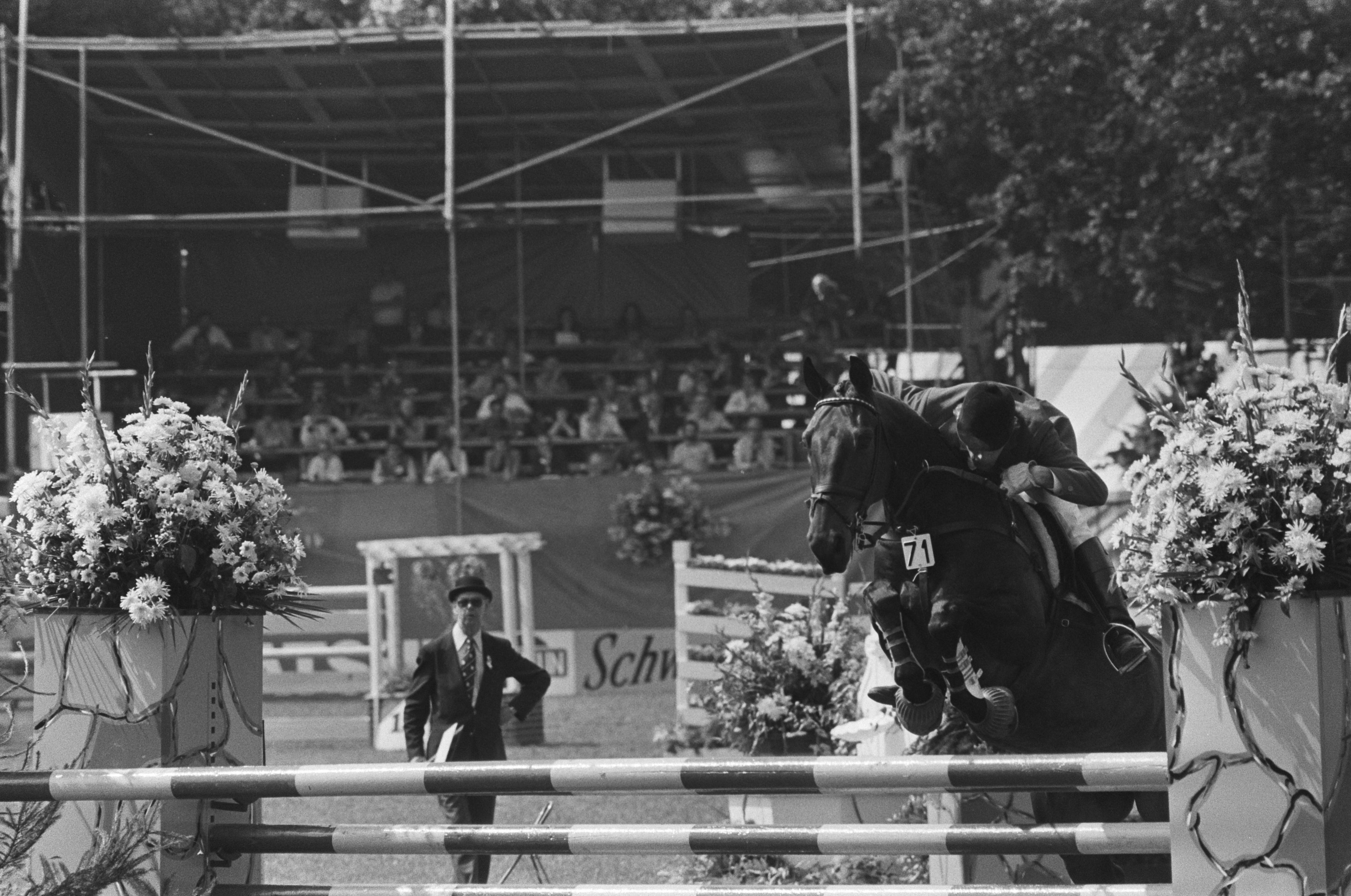
- Paul Schockemuhle with Deister at the European Show Jumping Championships 1979 in Rotterdam
- Breed: Hanoverian
- Sire: Diskant (Hanoverian)
- Grandsire: Dwinger (Hanoverian)
- Dam: Adlerklette (Hanoverian)
- Maternal grandsire: Adlerschild (Thoroughbred)
- Sex: Gelding
- Foaled: 10 February 1971; Osterbruch, Germany
- Died: 27 August 2000 (aged 29); Osterbruch, Germany
- Country: Germany
- Colour: Bay
- Breeder: Hermann Hahl
- Owner: Paul Schockemöhle

Deister
Medal record

Equestrian

Olympic Games
Bronze medal – third place	1984 Los Angeles	Team Jumping

World Championships
Silver medal – second place	1982 Dublin	Team Jumping

European Championships
Silver medal – second place	1979 Rotterdam	Individual Jumping
Silver medal – second place	1979 Rotterdam	Team Jumping
Gold medal – first place	1981 Münich	Individual Jumping
Gold medal – first place	1981 Münich	Team Jumping
Gold medal – first place	1983 Hickstead	Individual Jumping
Bronze medal – third place	1983 Hickstead	Team Jumping
Gold medal – first place	1985 Dinard	Individual Jumping
Bronze medal – third place	1985 Dinard	Team Jumping

Deister (10 February 1971 – 27 August 2000) was a Hanoverian horse ridden by Paul Schockemöhle and Hartwig Steenken. He won many top international competitions in the sport of show jumping. He was three times European Champion. He stood 16.3½ hh (171 cm).

== Achievements ==
- Winner, Individual Gold Medal 1981 European Championships in Munich, Germany
- Winner, Individual Gold Medal 1983 European Championships in Hickstead, England
- Winner, Individual Gold Medal 1985 European Championships in Dinard, France
- Individual Silver Medal 1979 European Championships in Rotterdam, The Netherlands
- Winner, Team Gold Medal 1981 European Championships in München
- Team Silver Medal 1979 European Championships in Rotterdam
- Team Bronze Medal 1983 European Championships in Hickstead
- Team Bronze Medal 1985 European Championships in Dinard
- Team Silver Medal 1982 Show Jumping World Championships in Dublin, Ireland
- 6th Individual 1982 World Championships, Dublin
- Team Bronze Medal 1984 Olympics in Los Angeles
- 7th Individual 1984 Olympics in Los Angeles
- Winner of the 1983 King George V Gold Cup, England
- Winner of the 1984 Aachen (CHIO) Grand Prix
- Winner of the 1982 Hickstead Derby
- Winner of the 1986 Hickstead Derby
- Five German Championships with Schockemöhle (1980, 1982, 1983, 1986 and 1987)
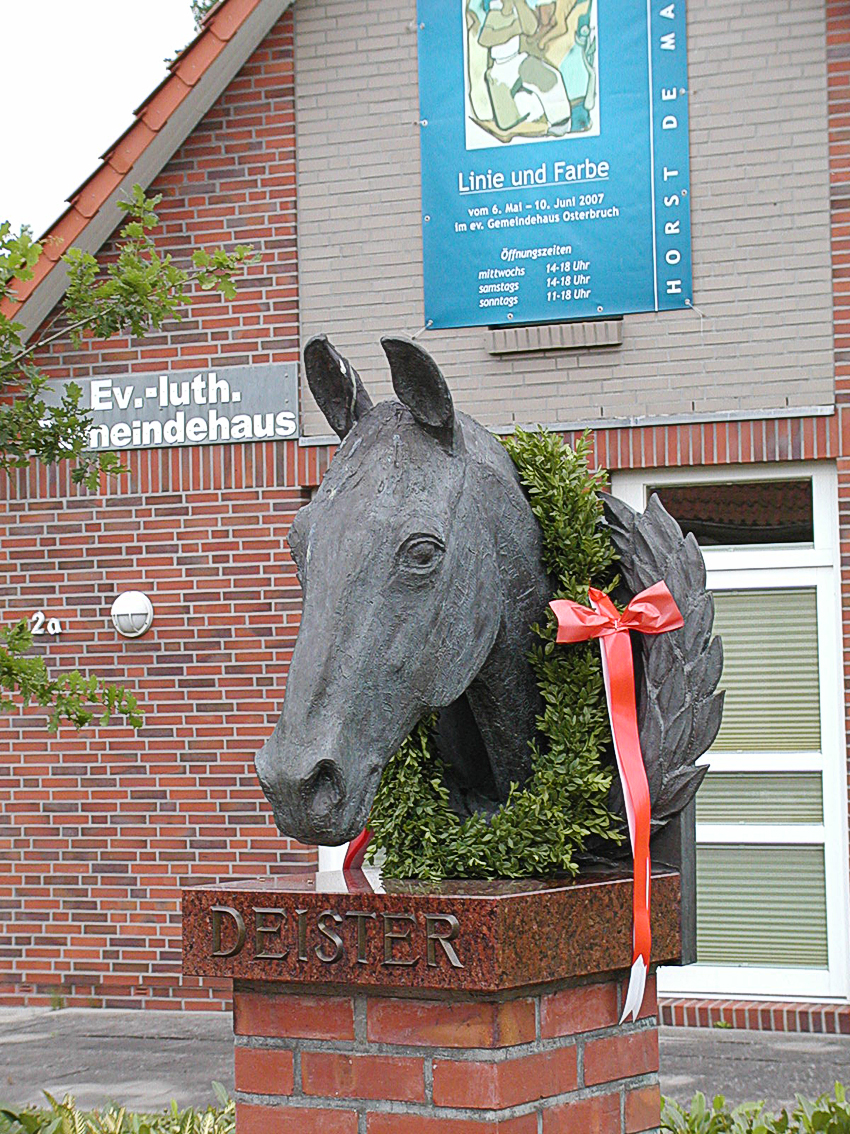
  Memorial to Deister in Osterbruch
