= André Thieme =

German rider (born 1975)

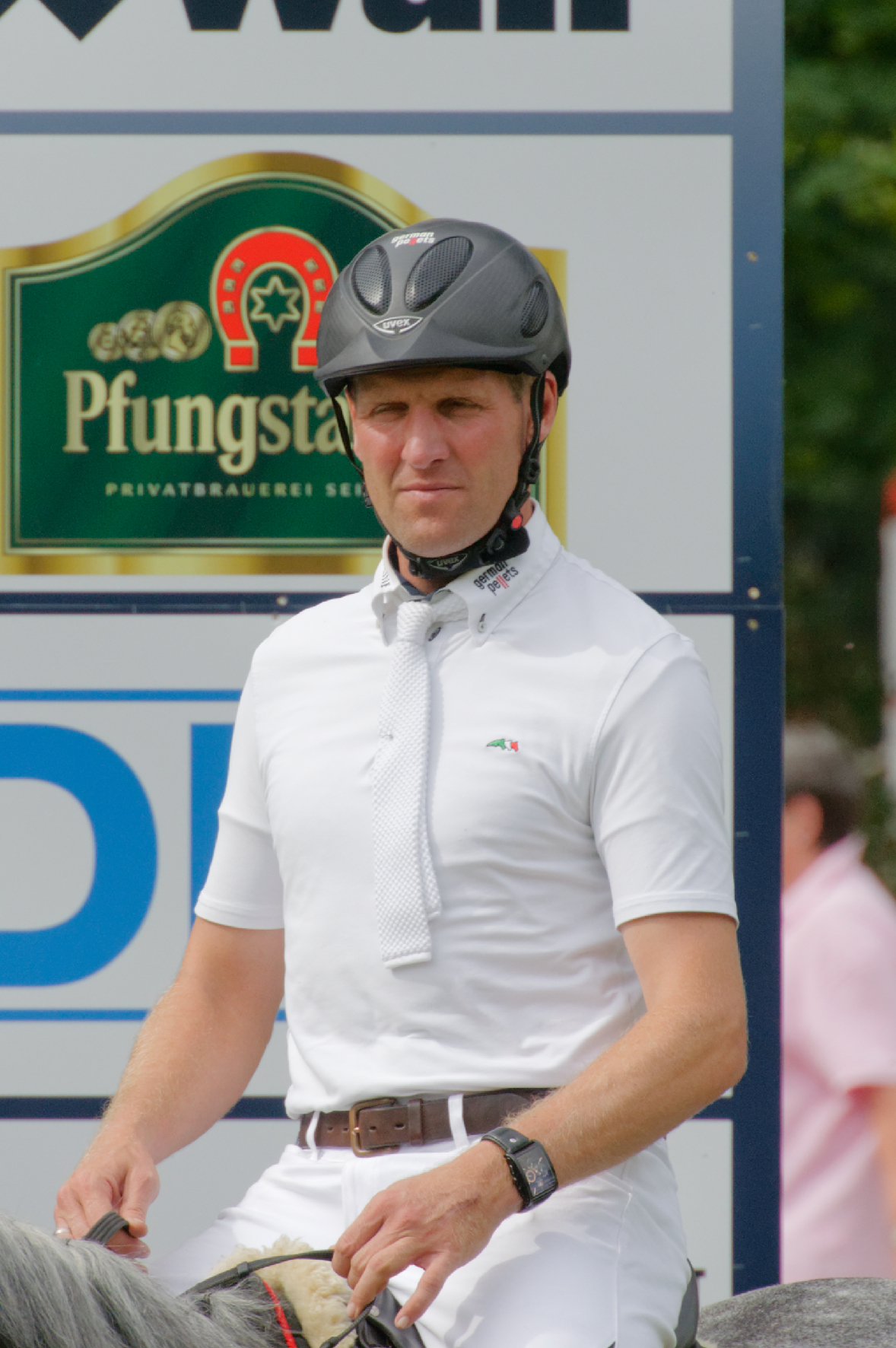
- André Thieme (2014)

Personal information
- Nationality: German
- Discipline: Jumping
- Born: 25 April 1975 (age 51)
Medal record
Equestrian
Representing Germany
European Championships
Gold medal – first place	2021 Riesenbeck	Individual jumping
Silver medal – second place	2021 Riesenbeck	Team jumping

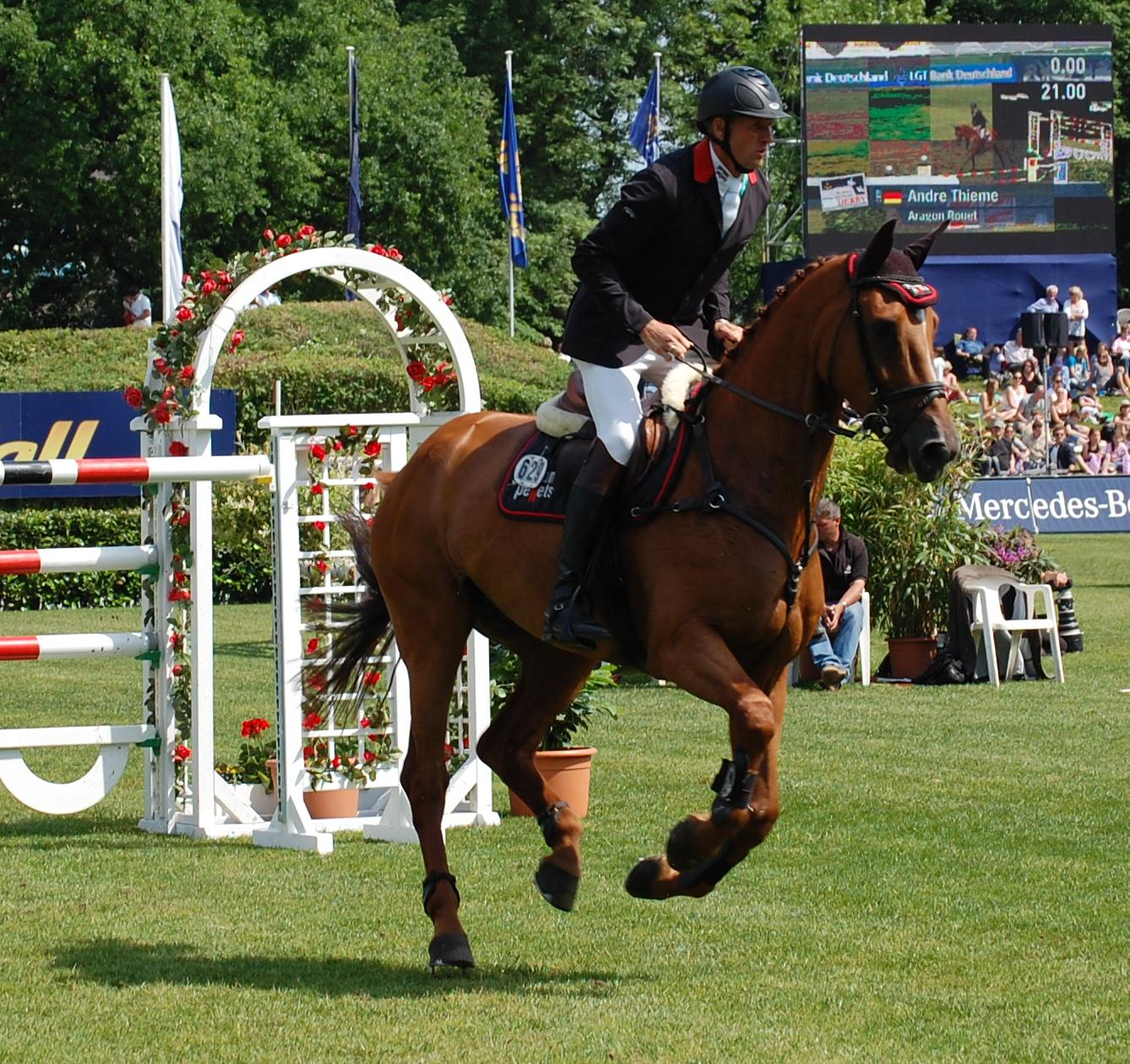
André Thieme with Aragon Rouet, CSI 5* Hamburg 2011

André Thieme (born April 25, 1975) is a German rider who competes in show jumping.

André Thieme was born as the son of Michael Thieme, a dressage rider and “Obersattelmeister” of the state stud in Redefin. At the age of 19, he received the “Goldene Reitabzeichen”, a mention for ten victories in dressage competitions on high level of difficulty. Thenceforth he focused riding show jumping competitions.

Thieme is a professional show jumping rider and master horse farm manager (“Pferdewirtschaftsmeister“). In 2007, he was second at the championship of the German professional show jumping riders. In 2009 and 2010, Thieme was the most successful rider of Mecklenburg-Vorpommern. He was several times part of German Nation Cup teams in Eastern Europe and North America.

He lives in Plau am See in the north-east of Germany together with his wife and his son; his horses lives in a stable in Leizen near Röbel since April 2012. Since 2010, Thieme has much success at horse shows in big horse shows in North America, where he lives some months in the year.

The first main success in the career of André Theime was his victory in the 78th German show jumping derby in Hamburg. He was the second rider from the former German Democratic Republic (after Holger Wulschner in the year 2000) who win this competition. The Derby is a world-famous show jumping competition over special natural fences. In 2008, he won the derby a second time, in 2011 a third time.

His probably biggest success in his career so far was the win of the 2011 $1,000,000 Grand Prix in Saugerties, New York. For this event he had qualified in spring at national tournaments in Florida. In March 2014 he win the Great American $1 Million Grand Prix at Ocala, Florida riding Contanga. In the years 2015 to 2017, Thieme and his gelding Conthendrix was several times part of German Nations Cup teams.

During his annual stay in Florida André Thieme win End of March 2021 the final Grand Prix of the Ocala Winter Circuit, riding Chakaria. With this victory Thieme was the first rider was the first rider who won four $1,000,000 Grand Prix organized by HITS, Inc. in his career. Even after returning to Europe, the 2021 season was highly successful for him: He was nominated for two of the four Nations Cups of the Europe Division of the FEI Nations Cup series with Chakaria and was also victorious with his other horses, for example in the Herzlake Grand Prix. In early July 2021 he was nominated for the Summer Olympics in Tokyo.

He was part of the silver winning German team at the European Championships 2021 in Riesenbeck, Germany with Chakaria. With just 2.84 penalties after three rounds, he was the best rider of the German team. With one clear round and four penalties in the final competition André Thieme and Chakaria won the individual gold medal.

== Horses ==
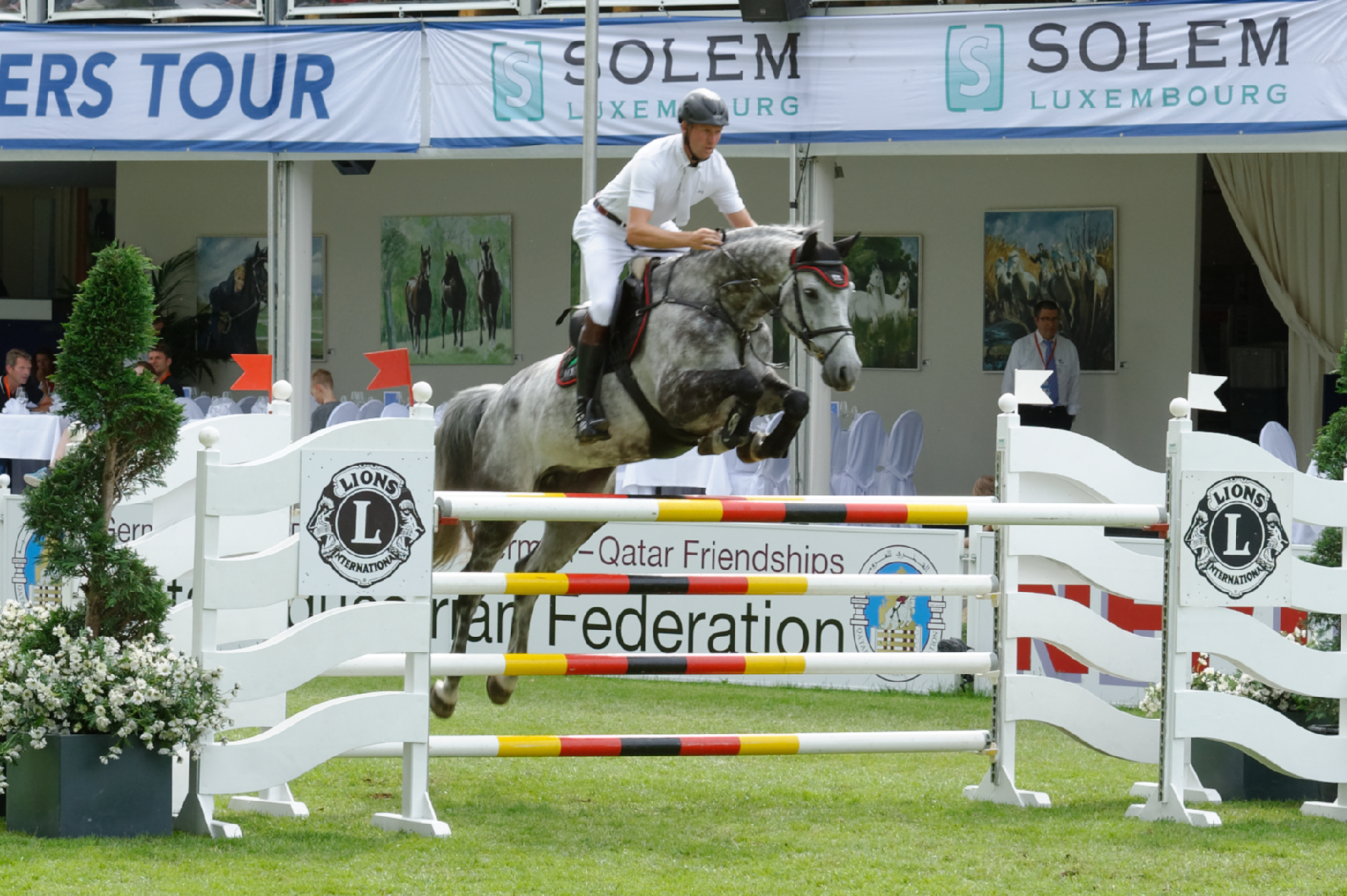
Andre Thieme with Conthendrix (2014)

=== Current ===
- Chakaria (born 2010), chestnut mare, German sport horse, sire: Chap, sire of dam: Askari
- Conacco (born 2011), bay gelding, Oldenburg show jumping horse, sire: Conoglio, sire of dam: Chacco-Blue
- Cupertino (born 2008), bay stallion, Holsteiner, sire: Contender, sire of dam: Leonce
- Liratus (born 2005), bay gelding, Danish Warmblood, sire: Corratus, sire of dam: Limebrand

=== Former sport horses ===
- Cellestial (born 1994), grey stallion, Oldenburg horse sire: Cantus; first ridden in sport by Heiko Schmidt, up to beginning 2005 ridden by Rolf-Göran Bengtsson, then ridden by Jan Peters, from Autumn 2005 to beginning 2006 ridden by Rene Tebbel, 2006 ridden by André Thieme, in 2008 ridden by Katrin Schmidt, today breeding sire
- Nacorde (born 1995), brown gelding, Dutch Warmblood, sire: Concorde, retired from sport in 2012
- Magnus (born 1996), chestnut gelding, sire: Matador, since January 2010 ridden by Andrew Coolen
- Antares F (born 2000), grey gelding, Württemberger, sire: Araconit, since July 2010 ridden by McLain Ward
- Aragon Rouet (born 2000, former “Aragon ter Spelonck”), dark brown gelding, Belgian Warmblood, sire: Baloubet du Rouet, since autumn 2011 ridden by Meg O'Mara
- Katie Riddle (born 2000), grey mare, Brandenburger, sire: Kolibri, since 2010 ridden by John McConnell
- Coco (born 2001), dark brown gelding, Mecklenburger, sire: Cellestial, at the World Breeding Jumping Championships for young horses and in 2011 ridden by André Thieme, up to 2010 ridden by Heiko Schmidt, since then owned and ridden by Seth Vallhonrat, since May 2011 ridden by McLain Ward
- Uvalier (born 2001), brown gelding, Belgian Warmblood, sire: Cavalier, in Spring 2011 sold to Canada
- Caesar (born 2002), chestnut gelding, stud book of Zangersheide, sire: Canabis Z, since 2012 ridden by Christi Israel
- Contanga (born 2004), bay mare, Oldenburg Show Jumping horse, sire: Catoki, sold in summer 2015 to Athina Onassis
- Conthendrix (born 2004), grey gelding, Holsteiner, sire: Contendro, sire of dam: Cor de la Bryère; Ridden by Mary Looke from 2018
- Voigtsdorfs Quonschbob (born 2004, former name: Querly P), dark bay gelding, Oldenburg Show Jumping horse, sire: Querlybet Hero

== Results (since 2005) ==
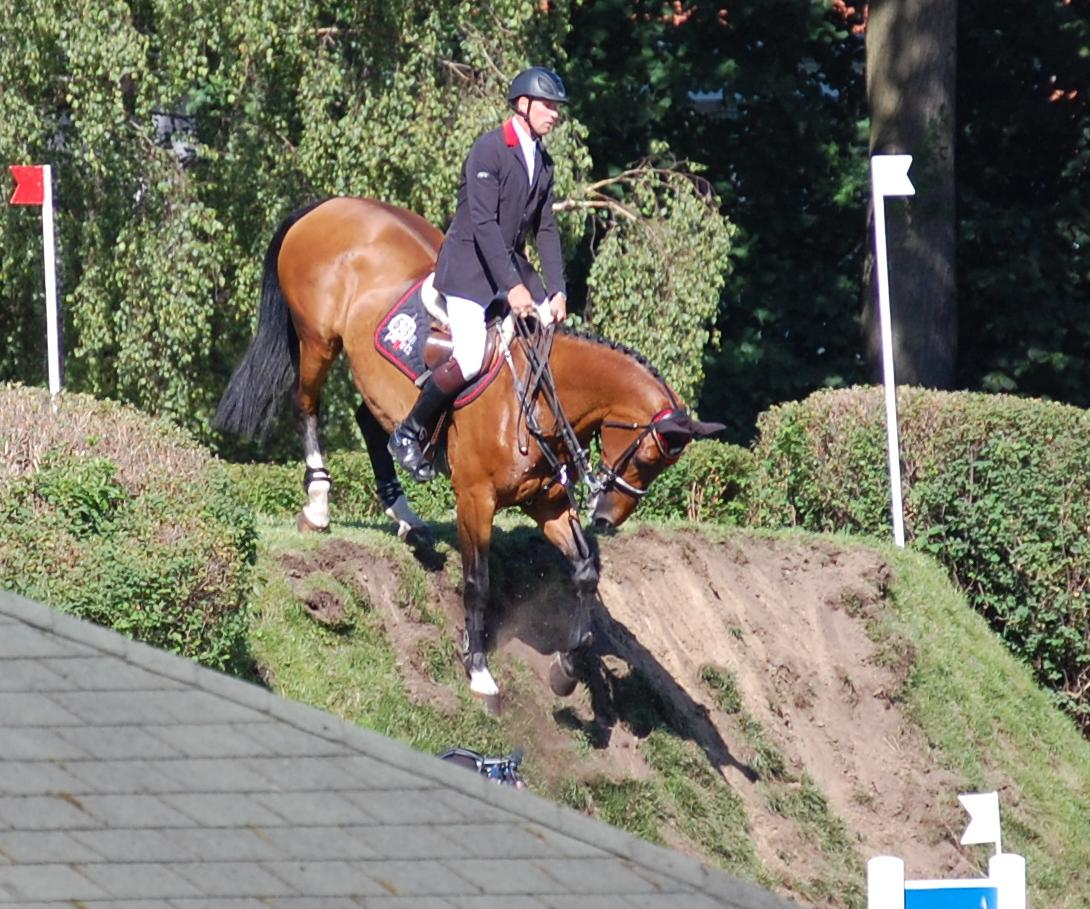
André Thieme with Nacorde, Second qualifier to the German Show Jumping Derby 2011

=== International Championships ===
- 2021:
  - Olympic Games, Tokyo, Japan: 9. place team and 31. place individual
  - European Championships, Riesenbeck, Germany: team silver medal and individual gold medal

=== Other major results ===
- 2021:
  - Grand Prix of Klein Roscharden (CSI 2*): 4th place with Conacco
  - Nations Cup of Sopot (CSIO 5*): 1st place with Chakaria
  - Grand Prix of St. Gallen (CSIO 5*): 4th place with Chakaria
  - Nations Cup of St. Gallen (CSIO 5*): 2nd place with Chakaria
  - CSI 2* Grand Prix of Herzlake-Gut Einhaus: 1st place with Conacco
  - Grand Prix of Redefin (CSI 2*): 2nd place with Chakaria
  - Great American $1 Million Grand Prix of Ocala: 1st place with Chakaria
  - 200.000 US-$-Grand Prix of Ocala / HITS IX: 3rd place with Crazy Girl
  - Grand Prix of the 8th week of the Winter Equestrian Festival at Wellington FL (CSIO 4*): 2nd place with Chakaria
  - 150.000 US-$ Grand Prix of Ocala / HITS VI: 1st place with Crazy Girl
  - 200.000 US-$ Grand Prix of Ocala / HITS V: 3rd place with Crazy Girl
  - 150.000 US-$ Grand Prix of Ocala / HITS IV: 1st place with Conacco
  - 75.000 US-$ Grand Prix of the World Equestrian Ocala Winter Spectacular Nr. 6: 3rd place with Chakaria
- 2020:
  - 200.000 US-$ Grand Prix of Ocala / HITS V: 3rd place with Cellisto
  - Grand Prix of Dorfchemnitz (national class): 2nd place with Contadur
  - Nations Cup of Praha (CSIO 3*): 4th place with Chakaria
  - German show jumping championship at Riesenbeck: 5th place with Chakaria
- 2019:
  - 50.000 US-$ Grand Prix of Ocala / HITS VI: 3rd place with Cupertino
  - World cup leg of Ocala (CSI 3*-W Live Oak International): 2nd place with Aretino
  - Championship of Hamburg (CSI 5*): 3rd place with Crazy Girl V
  - Grand Prix of Werder (Havel) (national class): 1st place with Aretino
  - Falsterbo Derby at CSIO 5* Falsterbo: 1st place with Contadur
  - Grand Prix of Görlitz (national class): 2nd place with Contadur
  - Grand Prix of Gadebusch (national class): 3rd place with Contadur
  - Grand Prix of Sachsen (Chemnitz, national class) 2nd place with Liratus
- 2018:
  - CSI 3* Grand Prix of Ocala / HITS VI: 2nd place with Cupertino
  - 50.000 US-$ Grand Prix of Ocala / HITS VII: 3rd place with Cupertino
  - Grand Prix of Mühlengeez (national class): 1st place with Aretino
  - Nations Cup of Calgary at the CSIO Spruce Meadows 'Masters' Tournament (CSIO 5*): 1st place with Aretino
  - Grand Prix of Forst (Lausitz) (national class): 1st place with Contadur
  - Grand Prix of Saxony (Chemnitz, national class): 1st place with Aretino
- 2017:
  - CSI 2*-Grand Prix of Ocala / HITS VI: 3rd place with Conthendrix
  - World cup leg of Ocala (CSI 3*-W Live Oak International): 2nd place with Conthendrix
  - AIG $1 Million Grand Prix of Thermal: 4th place with Conthendrix
  - Great American $1 Million Grand Prix of Ocala: 3rd place with Conthendrix
  - Nations Cup of Lummen (CSIO 5*): 1st place with Conthendrix
  - Nations Cup of St. Gallen (CSIO 5*): 3rd place with Conthendrix
  - State championship of Mecklenburg-Vorpommern: 3rd place with Cupertino
  - Nations Cup of Falsterbo (CSIO 5*): 2nd place with Conthendrix
  - Grand Prix of Mühlengeez (national class): 1st place with Contadur
  - 1,000,000 US-$-Grand Prix of Saugerties (CSI 5*): 1st place with Conthendrix
- 2016:
  - 50,000 US-$-Grand Prix of Ocala / HITS VI: 2nd place with Cellisto
  - 50,000 US-$-Grand Prix of Ocala / HITS VIII: 2nd place with Conthendrix
  - 87th German show jumping derby (CSI 3* Hamburg): 3rd place with Quonschbob
  - Nations Cup of Falsterbo (CSIO 5*): no faults in both rounds with Conthendrix
  - Grand Prix of Aschersleben: 2nd place with Liratus
  - Grand Prix of Paderborn (CSI 3*): 3rd place with Conthendrix
  - Grand Prix of Saxonia at Chemnitz: 2nd place with Liratus
  - World cup leg of Poznań (CSI 3*-W): 2nd place with Conthendrix
  - 2016 Riders Tour season ranking: 2nd place
- 2015:
  - Grand Prix at the CSIO 4* Ocala: 3rd place with Conthendrix
  - 50,000 US-$-Grand Prix of Ocala / HITS VI: 2nd place with Conthendrix
  - Grand Prix of Redefin (CSI 3*): 3rd place with Ramona de Flobecq
  - 86th German show jumping derby (CSI 3* Hamburg): 2nd place with Quonschbob
  - Nations Cup of Sopot (CSIO 5*): 1st place with Conthendrix
  - Grand Prix of Aachen (CSI 5*): 7th place with Contanga
  - German show jumping championships at Balve: 13th place with Conthendrix
  - Grand Prix of Groß Viegeln (CSI 3*): 3rd place with Conthendrix
- 2014:
  - $1,000,000 Grand Prix in Ocala (Florida) / HITS X: 1st place with Contanga
  - Grand Prix of Forst (Lausitz), 2nd place with Conthendrix
  - German show jumping championships at Balve: 12th place (with Conthendrix) and 13th place (with Contanga)
  - Nations Cup of Falsterbo (CSIO 5*): 1st place with Conthendrix
  - Grand Prix of Falsterbo (CSIO 5*) 2nd place with Contanga
  - Nations Cup of Hickstead (CSIO 5*): 2nd place with Contanga
  - Nations Cup of Porto Alegre (CSIO 4*): 2nd place with Ramona de Flobecq
- 2013:
  - $50,000 Grand Prix in Ocala (Florida) / HITS IV: 2nd place with Catharina
  - $50,000 Grand Prix in Ocala (Florida) / HITS VI: 2nd place with Quonschbob
  - Nations Cup of Wellington FL (CSIO 4*): 3rd place with Contanga
  - $100,000 Grand Prix in Ocala (Florida) / HITS IX: 1st place with Contanga
  - Grand Prix of Gijon (CSIO 5*): 1st place with Contanga
- 2012:
  - $25,000 Grand Prix in Ocala (Florida) / HITS II : 1st place with Caesar
  - Championat of Redefin (Germany, CSI 2*): 1st place with Nacorde
- 2011:
  - $1,000,000 Grand Prix in Saugerties (New York): 1st place with Aragon Rouet
  - Show jumping championship of Mecklenburg-Vorpommern, Sukow: 2nd place
  - 82nd German show jumping derby in Hamburg: 1st place with Nacorde
  - Grand Prix of Redefin (Germany, CSI 2*): 1st place with Aragon Rouet
  - $100,000 Grand Prix in Ocala (Florida) / HITS VI: 3rd place with Coco
  - $50,000 Grand Prix in Ocala (Florida) / HITS V: 1st place with Coco
  - $50,000 Grand Prix in Ocala (Florida) / HITS II : 1st place with Caesar, 3rd place with Uvalier
- 2010:
  - Show jumping championship of Mecklenburg-Vorpommern, Sukow: 1st place
  - $1,000,000 Grand Prix in Saugerties (New York): 9th place with Aragon Rouet
  - British Jumping Derby (CSI 4*): 3rd place with Nacorde
  - Nations Cup of Poland, Sopot (CSIO 3*): 1st place as part of the German team with Aragon Rouet
  - $100,000 Grand Prix of Devon (Pennsylvania): 3rd place with Antares F
  - $300,000 Grand Prix in Thermal (California): 5th place with Aragon Rouet
  - $75,000 Grand Prix in Ocala (Florida): 1st place with Caesar, 3rd place with Aragon Rouet
  - Nations Cup of United States, Wellington FL (CSIO 4*): 5th place as part of the German team with Antares F
- 2009:
  - Grand Prix of Redefin (Germany, CSI 2*): 1st place with Katie Riddle
  - 80th German show jumping derby in Hamburg: 3rd place with Nacorde
  - Nations Cup of Poland, Sopot (CSIO 3*): 3rd place as part of the German team with Katie Riddle
- 2008:
  - 79th German show jumping derby in Hamburg: 1st place with Nacorde
  - Nations Cup of Poland, Poznań (CSIO 4*): 4th place as part of the German team with Nacorde
- 2007:
  - 78th German show jumping derby in Hamburg: 1st place with Nacorde
  - German championship of the professional show jumping riders, Bad Oeynhausen: 2nd place
  - Swedish show jumping derby, Falsterbo (CSIO 5*): 2nd place with Nacorde
  - Indoor show jumping championship of Mecklenburg-Vorpommern, Redefin: 1st place with Magnus
- 2006:
  - Nations Cup of Hungary, Kiskunhalas (CSIO 4*-W): 1st place as part of the German team with Cellestial
  - 77th German show jumping derby in Hamburg: 2nd place with Nacorde
  - World Breeding Jumping Championships for young horses, Zangersheide (Belgium) – Five-year-old horses championship: 3rd place with Coco
- 2005:
  - Nations Cup of Estonia, Tallinn (CSIO 4*-W): 1st place as part of the German team
