= Gilles Thomas =

Gilles Thomas may refer to:

- Gilles Thomas (writer) (1929–1985)
- Gilles Thomas (equestrian) (born 1998)
