= Gustav Rau (hippologist) =

German hippologist

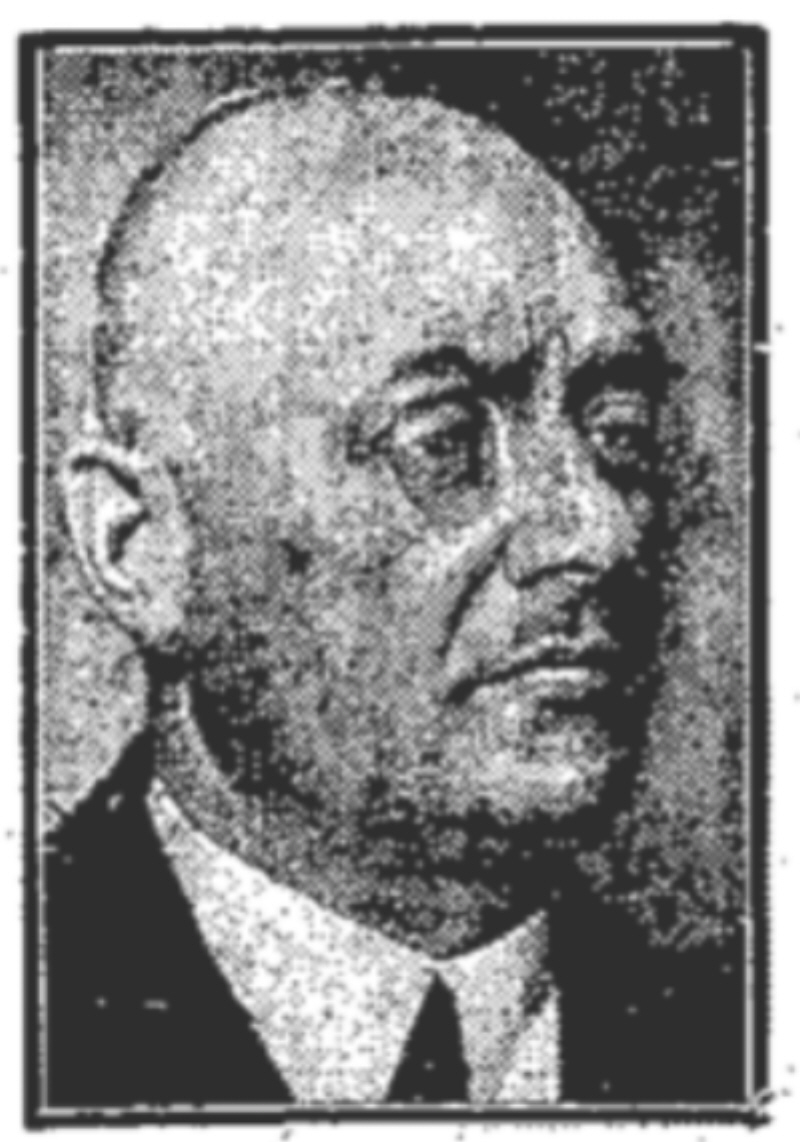
Rau

Gustav Rau (28 February 1880 – 5 December 1954) was one of the most notable German hippologists of the 20th century. He was also an author and a journalist, writing under the pseudonym Gustav Kannstadt. He was born in Paris to an army officer from Württemberg. After the death of his father, his mother moved the family to Switzerland and later to Stuttgart.

== Career ==
After World War II, Rau became the first postwar head of the German Olympic Equestrian Committee. He was also credited for discovering the horse Halla, the only horse to ever win three gold medals in jumping, on the 1960 team.

== Legacy ==
The Rau Medal was named after Rau; it is the highest equestrian honour in Germany. A street in Munich, Gustav Rau Strasse, near the Riem Thoroughbred racecourse was also named after him.

=== Nazi Party association ===
Rau was the administrator of a stud farm under the Third Reich. Because of his links to the Nazi government and his wartime activities, some scholars have suggested that the Rau Medal be renamed.
