= Jean-Maurice Bonneau =

French equestrian (1959–2024)

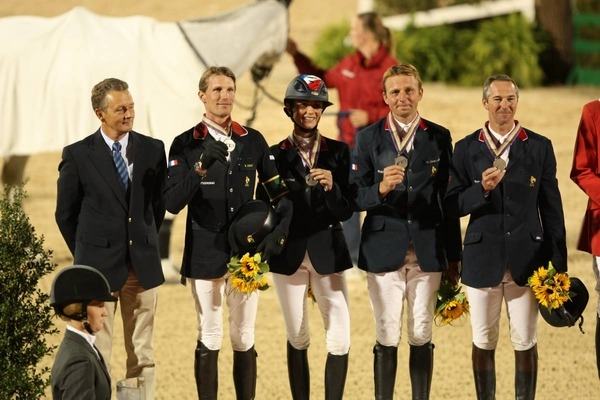
- Bonneau (most left) in 2010

Personal information
- National team: France
- Born: 15 May 1959 Vendée, France
- Died: 18 March 2024 (aged 64)
- Years active: 1987–1996; 2000–2006 (chef d’equipe)
- Website: https://jm-bonneau.com/

Sport
- Country: France
- Sport: Equestrianism
- Event: Show jumping
- Turned pro: 1984
- Retired: 2023
- Now coaching: Philippe Rozier, Kevin Staut
Medal record
Equestrianism
Representing France
European Show Jumping Championships
Silver medal – second place	1995 St. Gallen	team event

Jean-Maurice Bonneau (15 May 1959 – 18 March 2024) was a French equestrian and coach.

== Biography ==
Bonneau was born in Vendée, France in 1959. He first learned to ride at age 12, and in 1984 he followed his older brothers Jean-Pierre and André into a professional equestrian career.

=== Equestrian ===
Bonneau represented France at international competitions, including at World Championships and European Championships. He won the bronze medal at the 1995 European Show Jumping Championships in St. Gallen together with Hervé Godignon, Roger-Yves Bost and Alexandra Ledermann.

=== Coach and later life ===
After he retired from riding, he became a coach. He was head coach of the French national team from 2000 to 2006. During his period the team won the gold medal at the 2002 World Championships and the silver medal at the 2003 European Championships. After that he became coach of the Brazilian national jumping team, winning the silver medal at the 2011 Pan American Games. During the 2016 Summer Olympics he was the private coach of French riders Kevin Staut and Philippe Rozier, who would go on to win the gold medal.

In 2021 he became the technical advisor for the Young Riders Academy and he served four years on the FEI Jumping Committee. He retired in 2023.

Bonneau was a father and a grandfather. He died in March 2024, at the age of 64.
