= Katharina Rhomberg =

Austrian show jumping rider

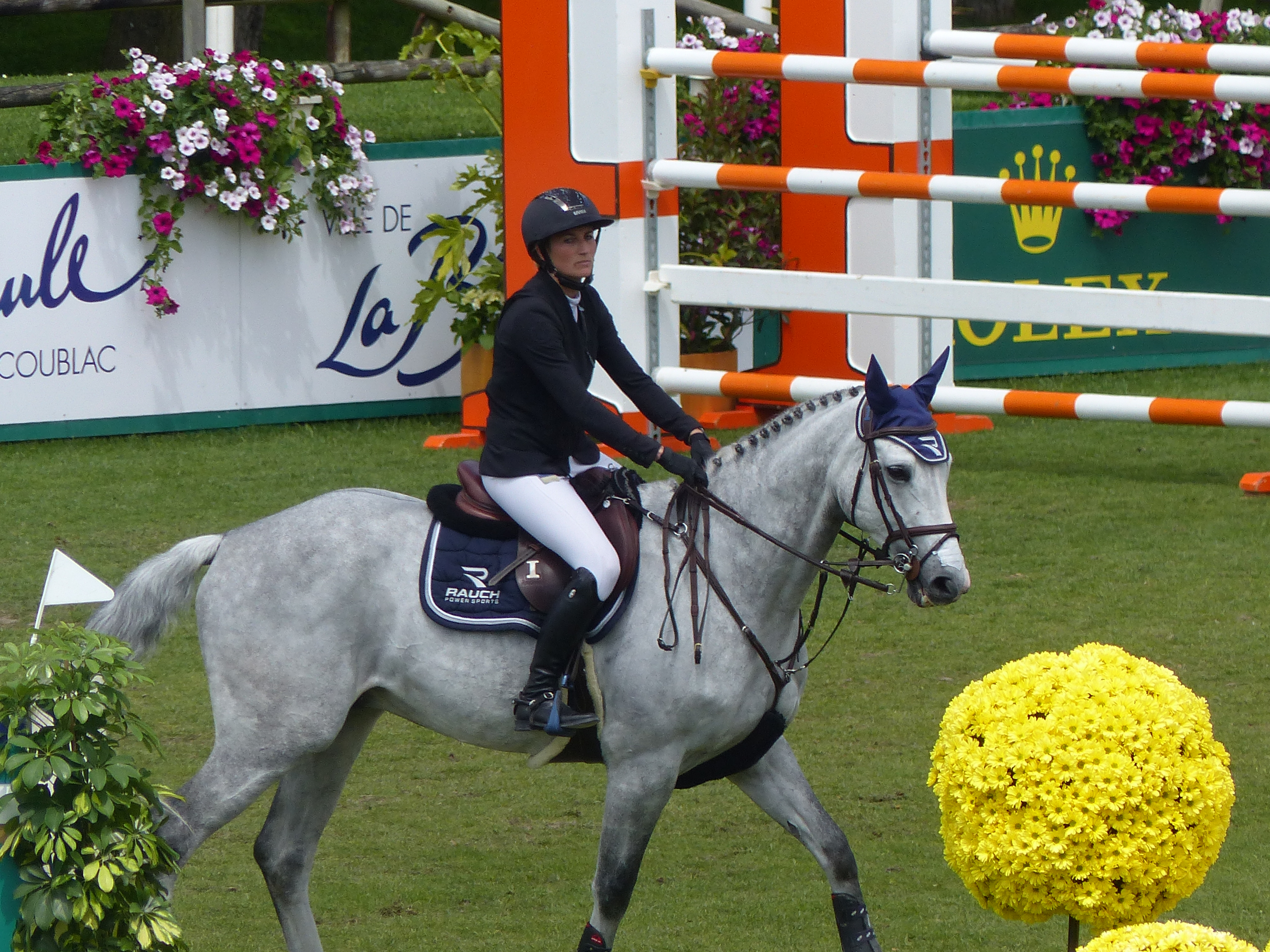
- Rhomberg at CSIO La Baule in 2024

Personal information
- Full name: Katharina Rhomberg
- Nationality: Austria
- Discipline: Jumping
- Born: 4 October 1992 (age 32); Dornbirn, Austria
Medal record
Representing Austria
European Championships
| Bronze medal – third place | 2023 Milan | Team jumping |

Katharina Rhomberg (born 4 October 1992 in Dornbirn, Austria) is an Austrian Olympic show jumping rider.

She competed at the 2024 Summer Olympics in Paris, France, where she placed 32rd in the individual competition and 13th in the team competition. She was also part of the Austrian team at the 2023 Show-Jumping European Championships in Milan, Italy, where they won a bronze team medal.
