= Paul Schockemöhle =

German equestrian

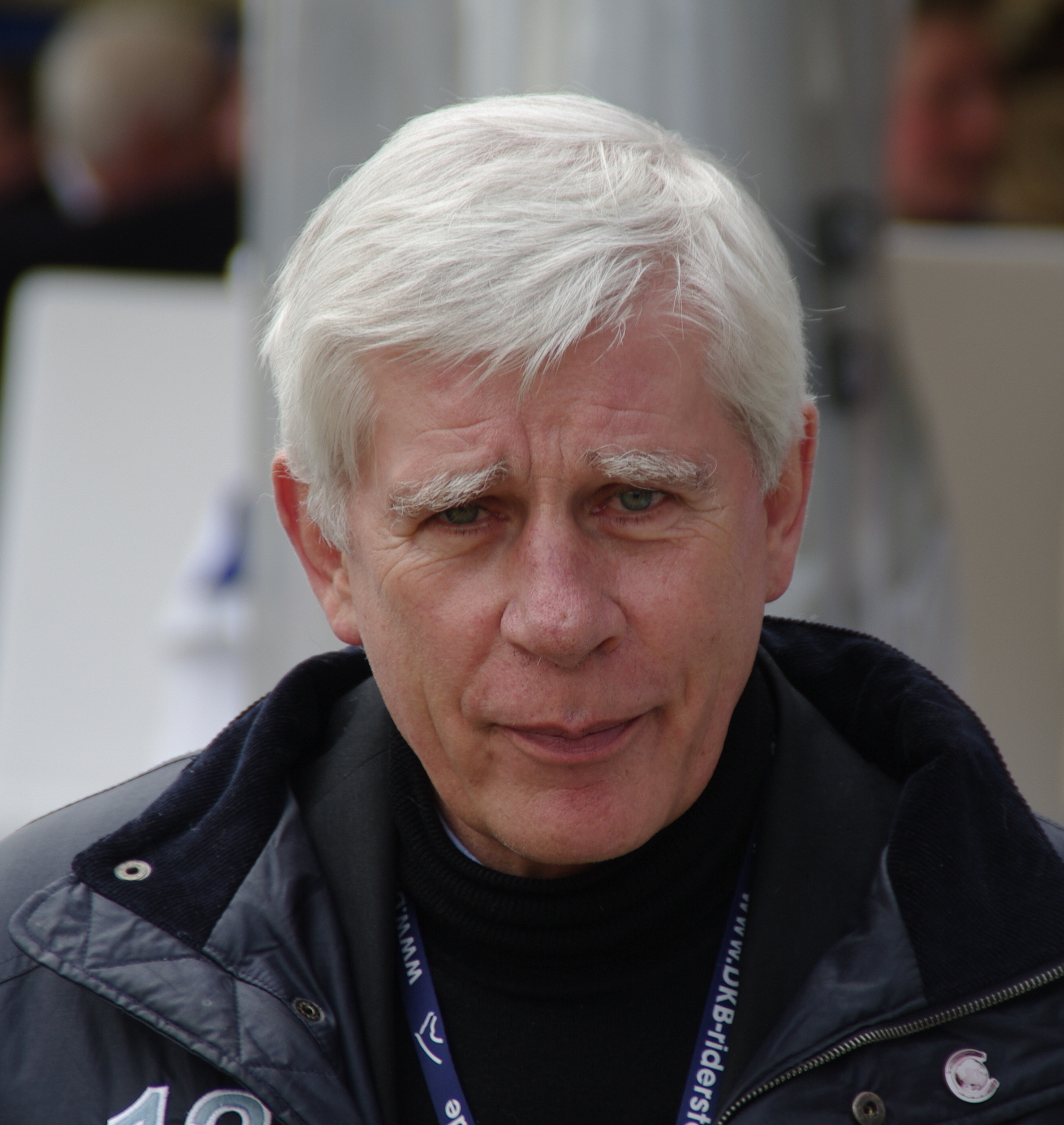
- Schockemöhle in 2013

Medal record

Equestrian

Representing West Germany

Olympic Games
Silver medal – second place	1976 Montreal	Team Jumping
Bronze medal – third place	1984 Los Angeles	Team jumping

World Championships
Silver medal – second place	1982 Dublin	Team jumping

European Championships
Gold medal – first place	1981 Munich	Individual jumping
Gold medal – first place	1981 Munich	Team jumping
Gold medal – first place	1983 Hickstead	Individual jumping
Gold medal – first place	1985 Dinard	Individual Jumping
Silver medal – second place	1979 Rotterdam	Individual jumping
Silver medal – second place	1979 Rotterdam	Team jumping
Bronze medal – third place	1977 Vienna	Team jumping
Bronze medal – third place	1983 Hickstead	Team jumping
Bronze medal – third place	1985 Dinard	Team jumping

Paul Schockemöhle (born 22 March 1945) is a German former showjumper. He was a successful international show jumping equestrian in the 1970s and 1980s at individual and team events in Olympic Games, World Championships and European Championships. He was three times European Champion on his best horse Deister. He is the brother of Alwin Schockemöhle, another leading German rider.

After competing as a rider Schockemöhle became both a breeder and trainer of sport horses. According to an interview in 2011, he estimated he owns 3,500 horses, including 35 show jumping and dressage stallions. In October 2010, it was announced that he had purchased Moorlands Totilas, a champion dressage stallion shown by Edward Gal, from Moorlands Stables. In 2016, Paul Schockemöhle became the registered owner of all horses of Ukraine's Olympic Show Jumping team when their owner Oleksandr Onyshchenko was indicted for embezzlement before the 2016 Rio Olympics.

== Controversies ==
In 1990, Schockemöhle was secretly recorded poling horses, a practice which involves hitting a horse's legs with a pole to train it to jump higher. Poling was and is forbidden by the International Equestrian Federation, and spot checks were subsequently carried out at several other German training establishments.

In 2012, PETA filed charges against Schockemöhle and Totilas' co-owner Ann Kathrin Linsenhoff alleging cruelty, claiming the stallion was kept in isolation from others and trained using the controversial method rollkur, which involves hyperflexion of the horse's neck. German authorities opened an investigation, but dropped all charges in 2013.

== Major achievements ==
- 1976: Silver medal in team at the Olympic Games in Montreal with Agent
- 1981: Gold medal in team and individual at the European Championships in Munich with Deister
- 1983: Individual gold medal at the European Championships in Hickstead with Deister
- 1984: Bronze medal in team at the Olympic Games in Los Angeles with Deister
- 1985: Bronze medal in team and individual gold medal at the European Championships in Dinard with Deister
- Hickstead Derby
  - 1982: Winner with Deister
  - 1985: Winner with Lorenzo
  - 1986: Winner with Deister
