= Alwin Schockemöhle =

German equestrian

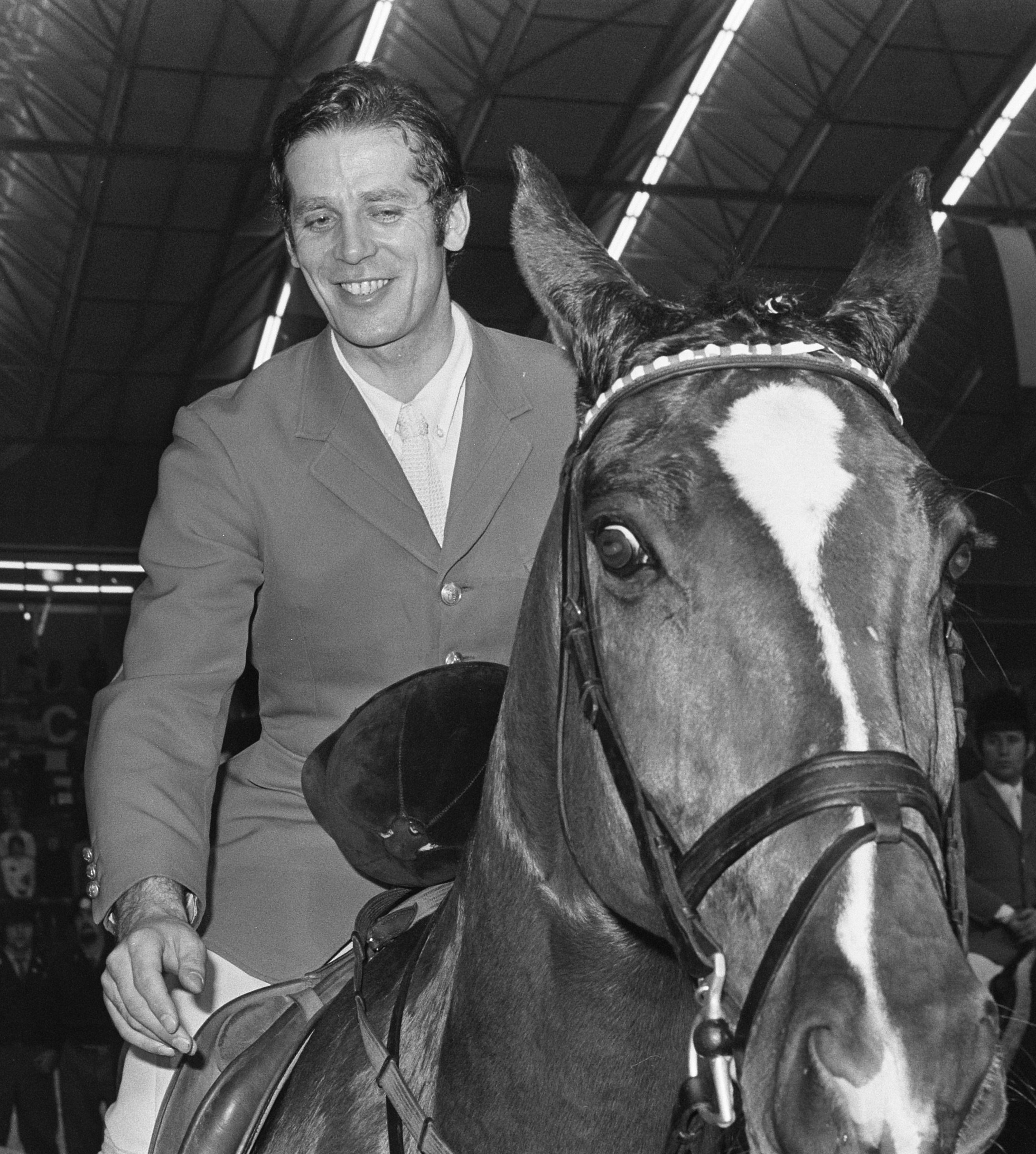
- Schockemöhle in 1972

Personal information
- Born: 29 May 1937 (age 89); Meppen, Province of Hanover, Germany
- Height: 1.70 m (5 ft 7 in)
- Weight: 72 kg (159 lb)
Medal record
Equestrian
Olympic Games
Representing Germany
| Gold medal – first place | 1960 Rome | Team jumping |
Representing West Germany
| Gold medal – first place | 1976 Montreal | Individual jumping |
| Silver medal – second place | 1976 Montreal | Team jumping |
| Bronze medal – third place | 1968 Mexico City | Team jumping |
European Championships
| Gold medal – first place | 1975 Munich | Individual jumping |
| Gold medal – first place | 1975 Munich | Team jumping |
| Silver medal – second place | 1963 Rome | Individual jumping |
| Silver medal – second place | 1969 Hickstead | Individual jumping |
| Silver medal – second place | 1973 Hickstead | Individual jumping |
| Bronze medal – third place | 1965 Aachen | Individual jumping |
| Bronze medal – third place | 1967 Rotterdam | Individual jumping |

Alwin Schockemöhle (born 29 May 1937) is a former German show-jumper. He was a successful international show jumping equestrian in the 1960s and 1970s at individual and team events in Olympic Games and European Championships. He was one of four children, a girl and three boys. His younger brother Paul was also a successful show-jumper. Werner Schockemöhle, his youngest brother, was a well-known horse breeder in Oldenburg.

== Biography ==
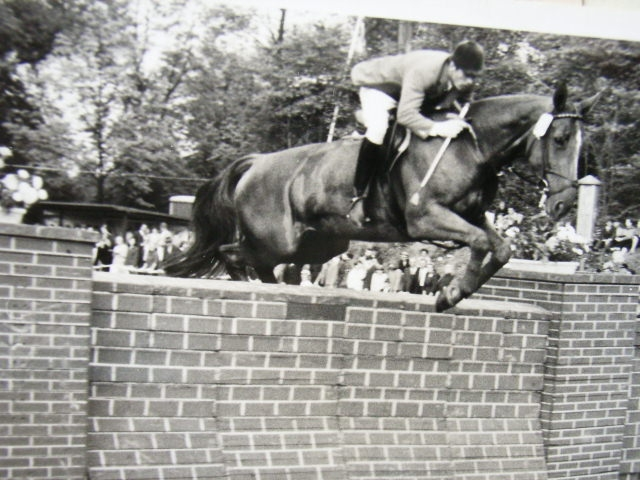
Schockemöhle with Zukunft, puissance competition, Wilhelmshaven (West Germany), c. 1965

Schockemöhle was involved in horses from an early age, and sold his grey mare Anaconda to the American equestrian Mary Mairs for DM100,000. His success in horse-dealing allowed him to fund the debt-ridden family estate when he took it over, aged 20.

Schockemöhle won his first Olympic gold medal in 1960 on the German show jumping team, followed in 1968 by a bronze medal. At the 1976 Summer Olympics, he won both gold in the individual and a silver medal with the German team which he was part of with his brother. He has won both the European and German championships several times.

By his first wife, Gaby, who later married Hendrik Snoek, he had a daughter, Alexandra, and two sons, Christoph, who lives in Singapore, and Frank, who is a manager in the German Bundesliga; and two daughters, Vanessa and Christina, by his second wife, Rita Schockemöhle. Rita also had three children by her previous husband, Gerhard Wiltfang. Alwin has been quoted as saying: "She has four children; I have five; altogether, there are seven".

Schockemöhle was inducted into Germany's Sports Hall of Fame in July 2016.

== Major achievements ==
- Olympic Games
  - 1960 in Rome: Gold medal team, individual 26th on Ferdl
  - 1968 in Mexico City: Bronze medal team, individual 7th on Donald Rex
  - 1976 in Montreal: Silver medal team, Gold medal individual on Warwick Rex
- European Championships
  - 1963 in Rome Bronze medal team, Silver medal individual on Ferdl and Freiherr
  - 1965 in Aachen: Bronze medal individual on Freiherr
  - 1967 in Rotterdam: Bronze medal individual on Donald Rex and Pesgö
  - 1969 in Hickstead: Silver medal individual on Donald Rex and Wimpel
  - 1973 in Hickstead: Silver medal individual on Rex the Robber and Weiler
  - 1975 in Munich: Gold medal team, Gold medal individual on Warwick Rex
- Other
  - Four times German champion (1961, 1963, 1967, 1975)
  - Thrice champion of the Grand Prix of Aachen (1962 on Freiherr, 1968 on Donald Rex and 1969 on Wimpel)
  - Thrice champion of the German Jumping Derby in Hamburg (1957, 1969, 1971)

== Sources ==
- derStandard.de June 2002
- Rheinlands Reiter – Pferde July 2004
- Eckhard F. Schröter: Das Glück dieser Erde. Leben and Karriere deutscher Springreiter.. Fischer-Taschenbuch-Verlag, Frankfurt a. M. 1980, ISBN 3-596-23019-5
