= Gerhard Wiltfang =

German equestrian

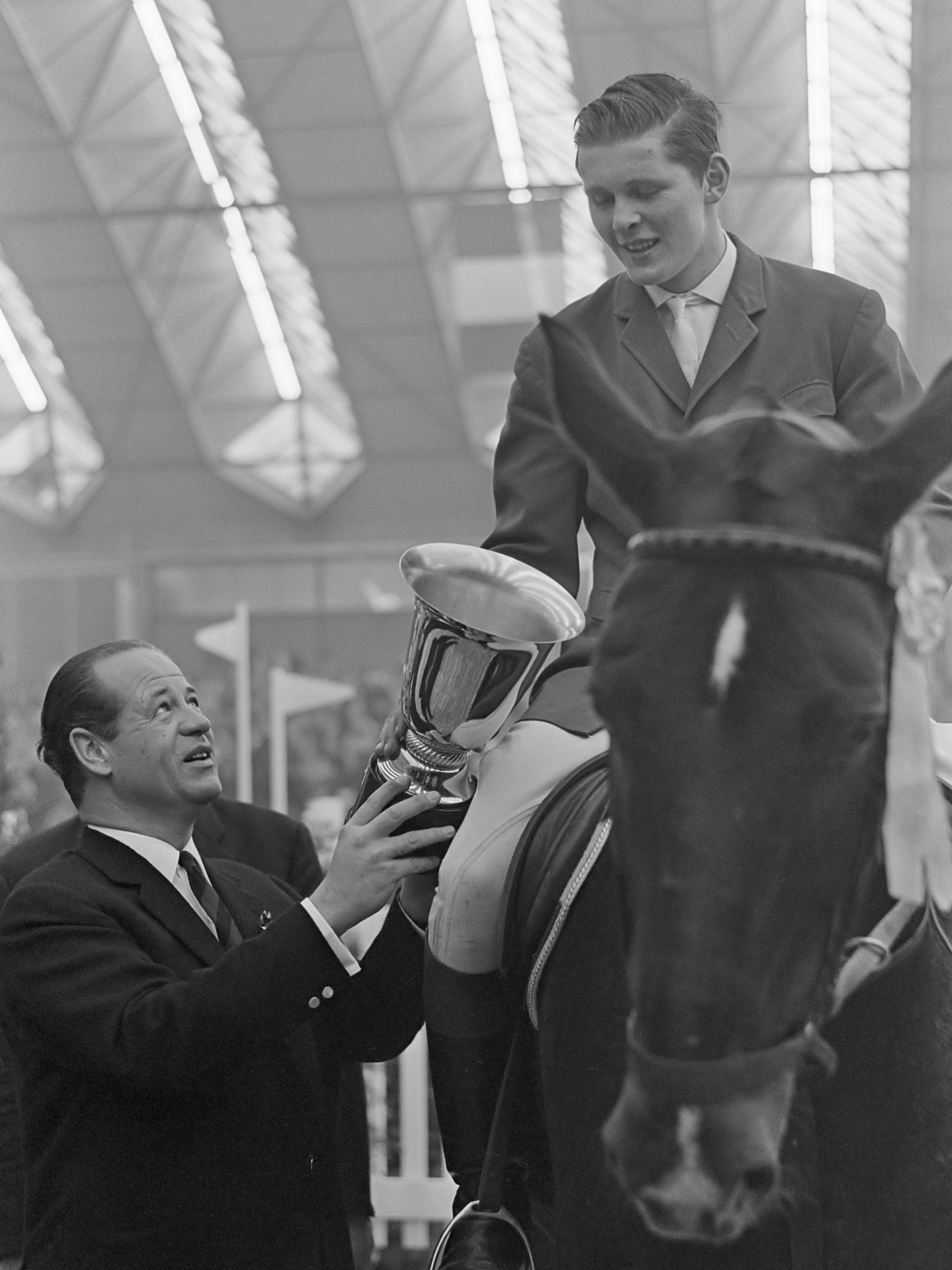
- Gerd Wiltfang receives a prize from Freddy Heineken (1965)

Personal information
- Nationality: German
- Born: 27 April 1946 Stuhr
- Died: 1 July 1997 (aged 51)

Sport
- Sport: Equestrian
Medal record
Equestrian
Representing West Germany
Olympic Games
Gold medal – first place	1972 Munich	Show jumping, Team

Gerhard "Gerd" Wiltfang (27 April 1946 in Stuhr, Lower Saxony – 1 July 1997 in Thedinghausen) was a German equestrian and Olympic champion. He won a gold medal in show jumping with the West German team at the 1972 Summer Olympics in Munich. In 1978, he won the World Championship in show jumping, and in 1982 the silver medal.

Witfang was married to Rita, with whom he had three children. They divorced and she later married Alwin Schockemöhle.

Wiltfang died in 1997 of heart failure.
