= Halla (horse) =

Olympic show jumping horse (1945–1979)

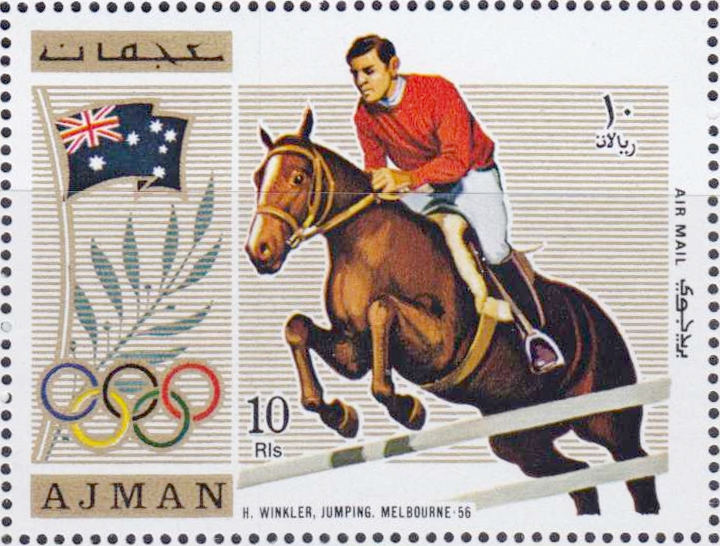
- Halla and Winkler depicted on a stamp from the United Arab Emirates
- Breed: Crossbred
- Sire: Oberst (Standardbred)
- Grandsire: Palmetto Watts (Standardbred)
- Dam: Helene
- Maternal grandsire: Ulan (Thoroughbred)
- Sex: Mare
- Foaled: 1945
- Country: Germany
- Colour: Bay, Star
- Breeder: Gustav Vierling

Halla
Medal record

Equestrian

Olympic Games
Gold medal – first place	1956 Stockholm	Individual Jumping
Gold medal – first place	1956 Stockholm	Team Jumping
Gold medal – first place	1960 Rome	Team Jumping

World Championships
Gold medal – first place	1954 Madrid	Individual Jumping
Gold medal – first place	1955 Aachen	Individual Jumping

European Championships
Bronze medal – third place	1958 Aachen	Individual Jumping

Halla (16 May 1945 – 19 May 1979) was a horse ridden by Hans Günter Winkler. She is the only horse ever to win three Olympic Gold medals in the sport of show jumping. She stood 16.2 hands (66 inches, 168 cm).

Halla (also listed as "Sonnenglanz") was born in the yard of Gustav Vierling in Darmstadt. Her parents were Helene, a French trotter horse of unknown breeding, and the Standardbred Oberst. Halla was first trained as a steeplechaser before she was discovered by the German Olympic committee. She was to be used in eventing competitions, but was considered very difficult and changed riders several times. Despite her great talent, she remained unsuccessful. In 1951 she was taken over by the then rising star Hans Günter Winkler.

Halla had already won back-to-back World Championships in show jumping when she and Winkler competed at the 1956 Olympics in Stockholm. During the first round, Halla took off early for the penultimate fence. Winkler was thrown into the air, landed heavily back in the saddle, and tore a groin muscle. He knew that if he withdrew from the final round, the German team would be eliminated. In great pain, he rode anyway, only being able to give the slightest direction to his mount. Halla completed the course without a fault, and they earned gold in both the individual and team events.

Four years later, at the 1960 Olympics in Rome, Halla and Winkler led the German team to another victory.

Together they won a total of 125 jumping competitions.

Halla retired from the sport on 25 October 1960 to begin her career as a broodmare. She had eight foals but none was a champion like herself.

Halla died on 19 May 1979 at the advanced age of 34 years.

== Pedigree ==
Pedigree of Halla
Sire Oberst Standardbred	Palmetto Watts; 1913	General Watts; 1904 T 2:06¾	Axworthy ch. 2:15½ 1892
Sire Oberst Standardbred	Palmetto Watts; 1913	General Watts; 1904 T 2:06¾	Carpet
Sire Oberst Standardbred	Palmetto Watts; 1913	Ottaray Belle; 1907	Rhythmic; 1897
Sire Oberst Standardbred	Palmetto Watts; 1913	Ottaray Belle; 1907	Night Queen; 1902
Sire Oberst Standardbred	Odelis; 1922	Morgenwind ch. 1911	Morgan Axworthy; 1907
Sire Oberst Standardbred	Odelis; 1922	Morgenwind ch. 1911	Della Bell; 1904
Sire Oberst Standardbred	Odelis; 1922	Ottaray Belle; 1907	Rhythmic; 1897
Sire Oberst Standardbred	Odelis; 1922	Ottaray Belle; 1907	Night Queen; 1902
Dam Helene	Unknown		
Dam Helene	Unknown		

== Major achievements ==
- Winner Individual Gold Medal 1956 Olympics in Stockholm
- Winner Team Gold Medal 1956 Olympics in Stockholm
- Winner Team Gold Medal 1960 Olympics in Rome
- Winner 1954 World Championships in Madrid
- Winner 1955 World Championships in Aachen
- Individual Bronze Medal 1958 European Championships in Aachen

International Grand Prix Wins include:

- 1957 Aachen (CHIO) Grand Prix
- 1958 Wiesbaden Grand Prix
- 1959 Rome (CSIO) Grand Prix
- Winner 1955 Hamburg Derby
