= Redefin =

- Municipality
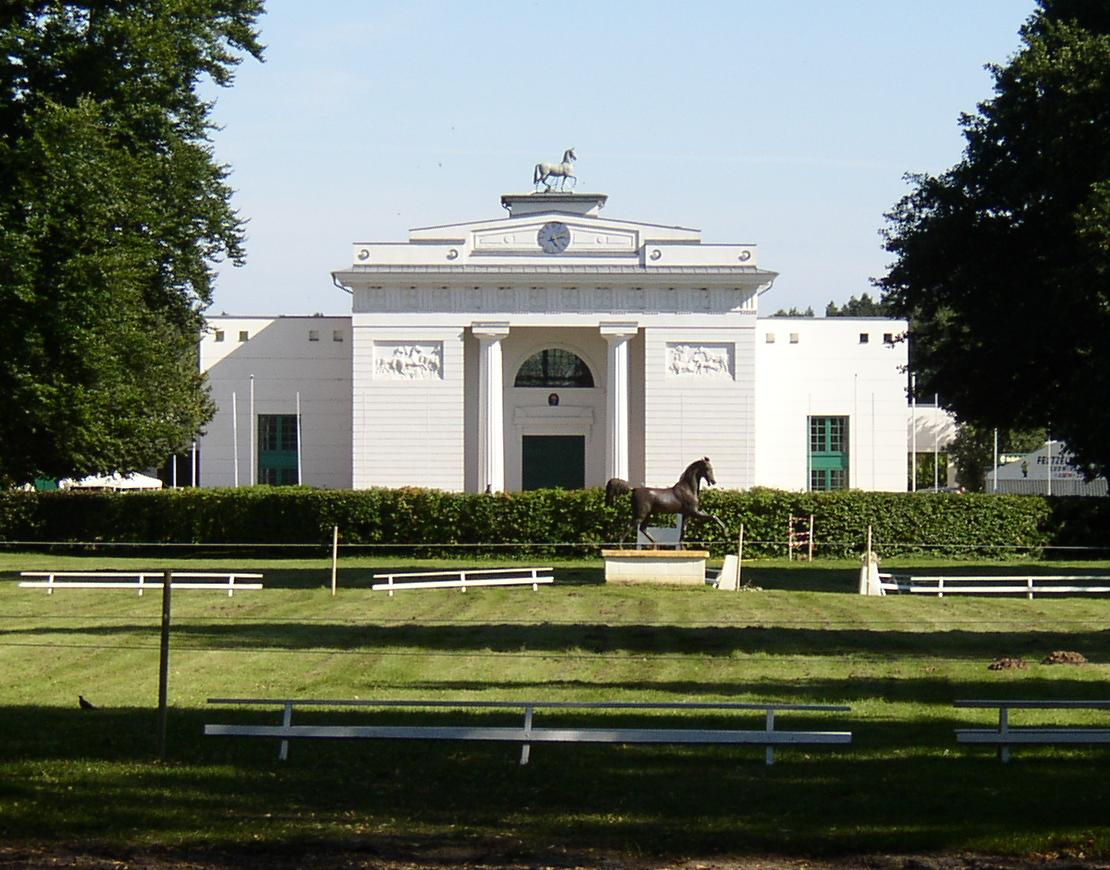
- Landgestüt Redefin in Redefin

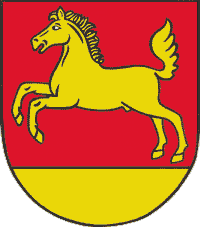
- Coat of arms

- Location of Redefin within Ludwigslust-Parchim district
- Interactive map of Redefin
- Location within Germany Location within Mecklenburg-Vorpommern
- Coordinates: 53°20′N 11°11′E
- Country: Germany
- State: Mecklenburg-Vorpommern
- District: Ludwigslust-Parchim
- Municipal assoc.: Hagenow-Land

Government
  - Mayor: Roswitha Böbel

Area
  - Total: 17.74 km^{2} (6.85 sq mi)
- Elevation: 15 m (49 ft)

Population (2025-12-31)
  - Total: 520
  - Density: 29/km^{2} (76/sq mi)
- Time zone: UTC+01:00 (CET)
  - Summer (DST): UTC+02:00 (CEST)
- Postal codes: 19230
- Dialling codes: 038854
- Vehicle registration: LWL
- Website: www.amt-hagenow-land.de

Redefin is a municipality in the Ludwigslust-Parchim district, in Mecklenburg-Vorpommern, Germany.

Redefin is mostly known because of the state stud farm (Landgestüt) of Mecklenburg-Vorpommern, which was founded in 1812.
