= Gilles Thomas (equestrian) =

Belgian equestrian (born 1998)

Personal information
- Nationality: Belgian
- Born: 27 May 1998 (age 28) Mechelen, Belgium
Medal record
Representing Belgium
European Championships
Gold medal – first place	2025 A Coruña	Team jumping
Bronze medal – third place	2025 A Coruña	Individual Jumping

Gilles Thomas (born 27 May 1998 in Mechelen, Belgium) is a Belgian Olympic show jumping rider. He competed at the 2024 Summer Olympics in Paris, France, where he finished 20th in the individual competition with the horse Ermitage Kalone. He won several major international Grand Prix's, including the Global Champions Tour legs in Shanghai in 2024 on Luna van het Dennehof, in Paris in 2025 on Ermitage Kalone and also in 2025 in New York on " Qalista DN". He also competed in several World Championships for young horses, European youth Championships and the FEI Nations Cup Final in Barcelona in 2022. In 2025, he won a team gold medal with Belgium and an individual bronze medal at the European Championships in A Coruña, Spain. Also in 2025, he won the 2025 Global Champions Tour in record-breaking fashion as the youngest ever Champion, securing the title with two stages still to come – the earliest any rider had done so in more than a decade.
