= Osterbruch =

- Municipality
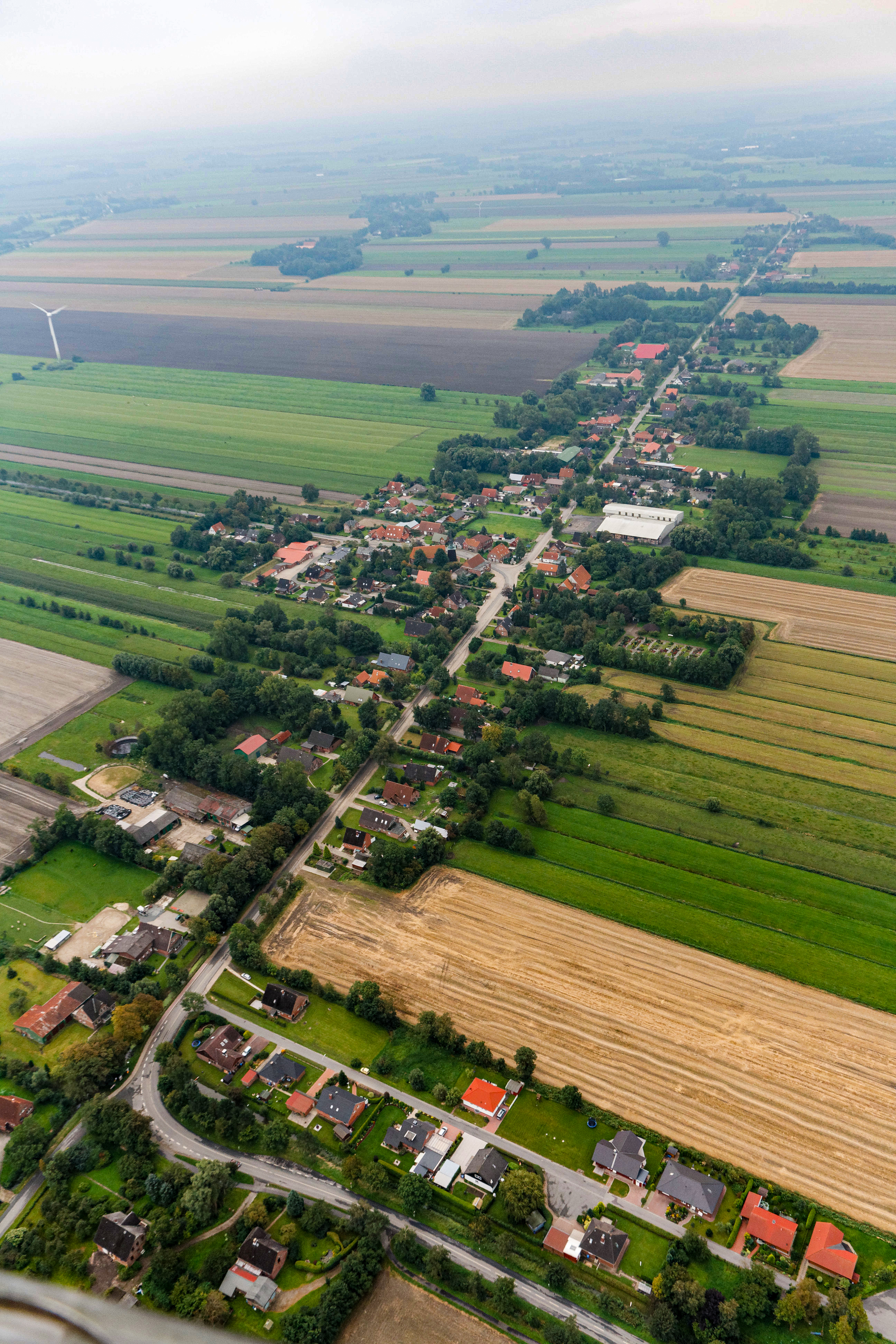
- Aerial view in 2011

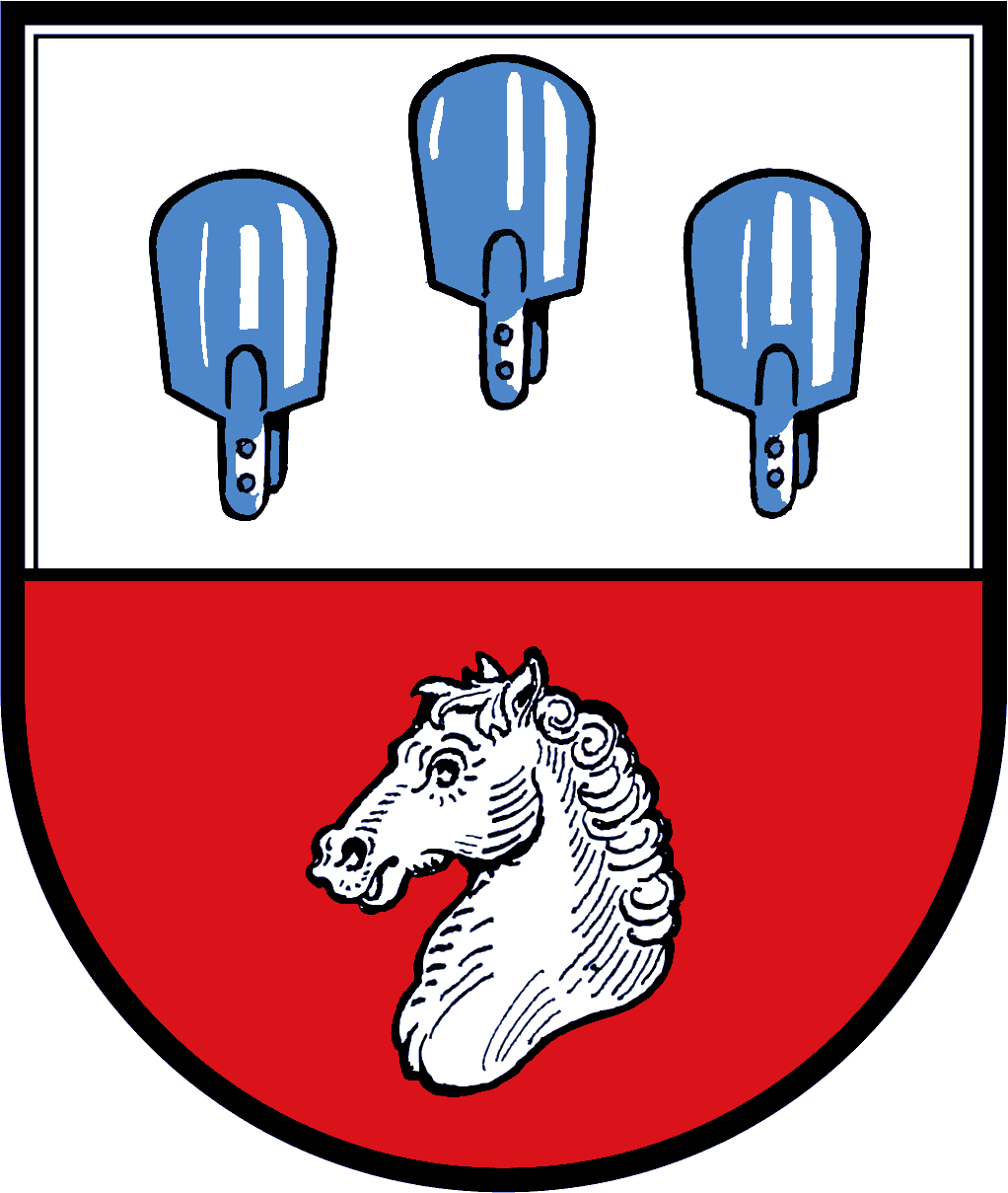
- Coat of arms

- Location of Osterbruch within Cuxhaven district
- Interactive map of Osterbruch
- Location within Germany Location within Lower Saxony
- Coordinates: 53°46′38″N 08°56′26″E
- Country: Germany
- State: Lower Saxony
- District: Cuxhaven
- Municipal assoc.: Land Hadeln

Government
  - Mayor: Peter von Spreckelsen (SPD)

Area
  - Total: 10.21 km^{2} (3.94 sq mi)
- Elevation: 2 m (6.6 ft)

Population (2025-12-31)
  - Total: 457
  - Density: 44.8/km^{2} (116/sq mi)
- Time zone: UTC+01:00 (CET)
  - Summer (DST): UTC+02:00 (CEST)
- Postal codes: 21762
- Dialling codes: 04751
- Vehicle registration: CUX
- Website: www.Osterbruch.de

Osterbruch is a municipality in the district of Cuxhaven, in Lower Saxony, Germany.

== History ==
Osterbruch belongs to the Land of Hadeln, first an exclave of the younger Duchy of Saxony and after its de facto dynastic partition in 1296 of the Duchy of Saxe-Lauenburg, established de jure in 1260. In 1728 Emperor Charles VI enfeoffed the George II Augustus and his House of Hanover in personal union with the reverted fief of Saxe-Lauenburg. By a redeployment of Hanoverian territories in 1731 the Hanoverian Duchies of Bremen and Verden were conveyed the administration of the neighboured Land of Hadeln. The Kingdom of Hanover incorporated the Land of Hadeln in a real union and its territory, including Osterbruch, became part of the new Stade Region, established in 1823.
