= Max Kühner =

Austrian equestrian

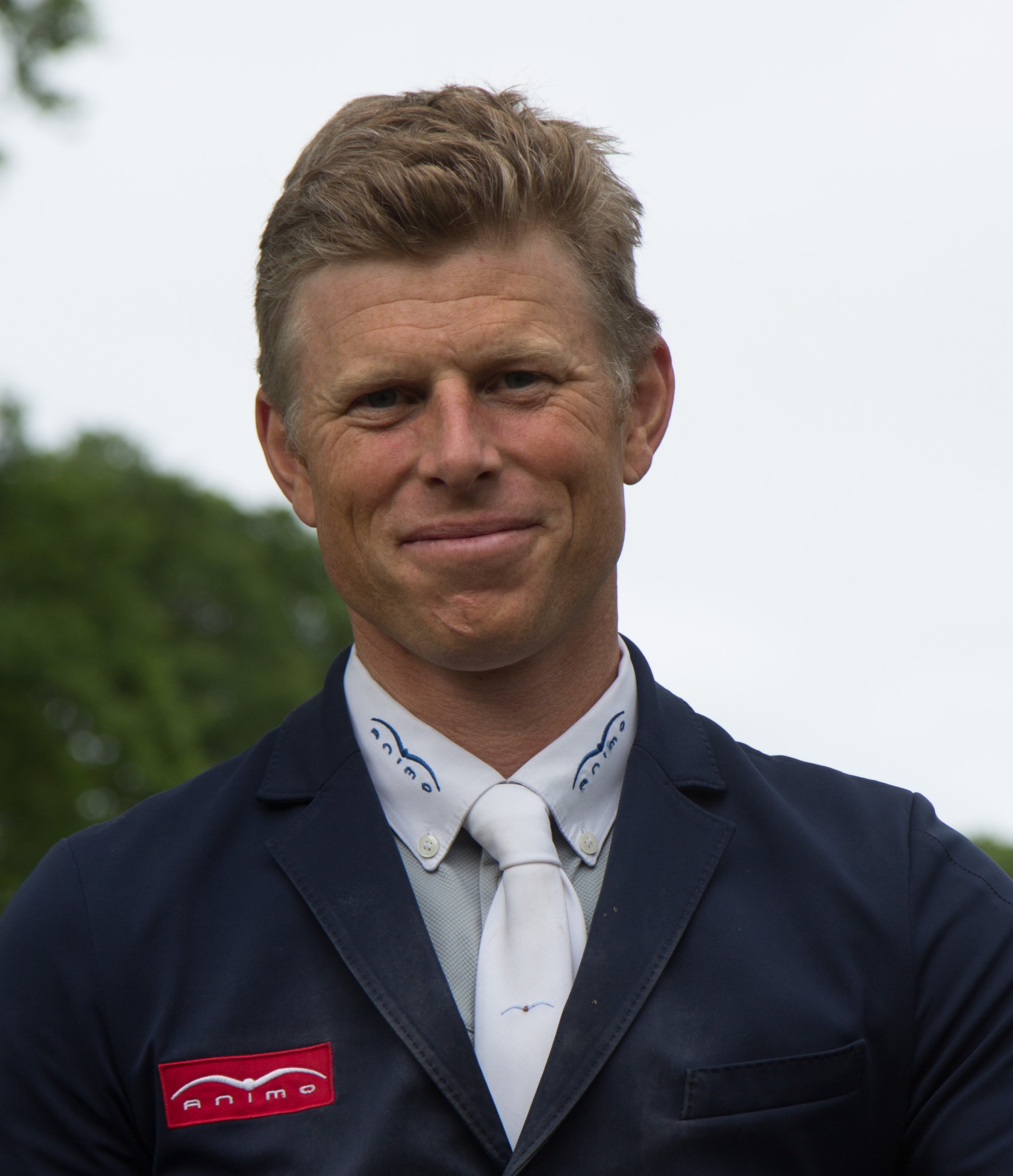
- Kühner in 2018

Personal information
- Nationality: Austrian, German
- Born: 15 January 1974 (age 52) Munich, Germany
- Spouse: Liv Kühner (dressage rider)

Sport
- Country: Austria(since 2015); Germany(2009-2015)
- Sport: show-jumping

Achievements and titles
- World finals: Tryon 2018; Herning 2022

Max Kühner (born 15 January 1974 in München, Germany) is a German-born Austrian show-jumping rider. He represented Austria at the 2024 Summer Olympic Games, the 2018 FEI World Equestrian Games in Tryon, North Carolina and the 2022 FEI World Championships in Herning, Denmark, where he finished 12th in the team and 6th in the individual competition. He has represented Austria at five European Show Jumping Championships and five FEI World Cup Finals. He is currently the highest ranked Austrian show-jumper, and rated third internationally.

== Show jumping career ==
Kühner trains and lives in Starnberg, Germany. In 2009, he was selected to compete for Germany at the World Cup Final in Las Vegas, but had to withdraw prior to competition. In 2015, he obtained Austrian citizenship to allow himself a better chance at competing for a national team.

=== 2024 season ===
At the 2024 show jumping world cup competition in Basel, Kühner placed third. At the Show Jumping World Cup final in Riyadh, Kühner competed on two horses, and placed seventh in the world cup rankings. At the Nations Cup in June, Kühner and the Austrian team placed sixth.

In 2024, Kühner was selected by the Austrian Equestrian Federation to represent the Austrian team at the 2024 Olympic Games in Paris. He placed 7th individually in the competition, after dropping a rail at the final obstacle.

=== Injuries ===
In 2019, Kühner broke his shoulder while competing in La Baule. After eight weeks of recovery, he returned to ride in the European Championships in Rotterdam.

In June 2024, he broke his hand while competing in the Nations Cup round in Sopot, Poland. He was unable to continue the competition, but recovered in time to compete in the 2024 Summer Olympics in Paris six weeks later.

=== Animal cruelty allegations ===
In 2008 Kühner was cited by the Bavarian Riding and Driving Association for allegations of animal cruelty. A subsequent disciplinary commission criticized his training practices, but did not find evidence of guilt. Afterwards, Kühner claimed the case was brought forward by a disgruntled associate for revenge.

In 2023, a whistleblower raised concerns about Kühner's training practices, and his facilities were searched by the police. A penal order was issued in March 2024, with a hearing scheduled in September 2024. In July 2024, PETA Germany filed a criminal complaint against Kühner with Munich's public prosecutor and released a report questioning his inclusion at the Olympic games. Kühner filed an appeal in response. Kühner denied the allegations, suggesting the report by PETA was spread deliberately before the games.
