= Equestrian at the 1964 Summer Olympics – Individual jumping =

Equestrian at the Olympics

Individual jumping at the Games of the XVIII Olympiad
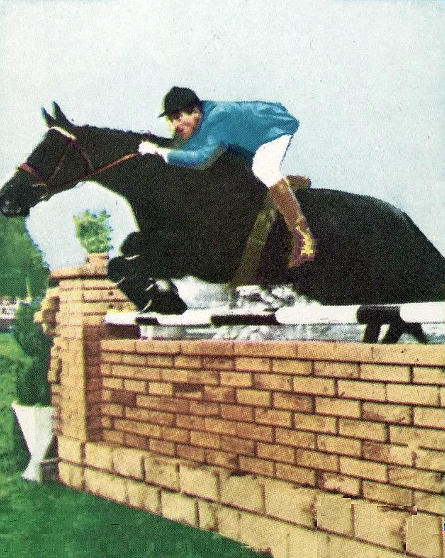
- Pierre Jonquères d'Oriola
- Venue: National Stadium
- Date: 24 October 1964
- Competitors: 46 from 17 nations
- Winning total: 9.00 faults

Medalists
| 1st place, gold medalist(s) | | Pierre Jonquères d'Oriola; France |
| 2nd place, silver medalist(s) | | Hermann Schridde; United Team of Germany |
| 3rd place, bronze medalist(s) | | Peter Robeson; Great Britain |

The individual show jumping was an equestrian event held as part of the Equestrian at the 1964 Summer Olympics programme. The event was held on 24 October 1964. There were 46 competitors from 17 nations. Each nation could have up to three riders. The event was won by Pierre Jonquères d'Oriola of France, the first rider to win two gold medals in individual jumping; he did so 12 years apart, with his first in 1952. It was France's third gold medal in the event overall, moving out of a tie with Italy at two for most all-time (counting Germany and the United Team of Germany separately). Hermann Schridde, representing the United Team of Germany, took silver. Great Britain earned its second consecutive bronze in the event, this time with Peter Robeson taking the honors.

== Background ==
This was the 12th appearance of the event, which had first been held at the 1900 Summer Olympics and has been held at every Summer Olympics at which equestrian sports have been featured (that is, excluding 1896, 1904, and 1908). It is the oldest event on the current programme, the only one that was held in 1900. After the team and individual results were separated in 1960 for the first time since 1920, the 1964 competition returned to using the same results for both events.

Four of the top 10 riders from the 1960 competition returned: gold medalist (and 1956 silver medalist) Raimondo D'Inzeo of Italy, silver medalist (and 1956 bronze medalist) Piero D'Inzeo of Italy, bronze medalist David Broome of Great Britain, and fifth-place finisher (and 1956 gold medalist) Hans Günter Winkler of the United Team of Germany. The D'Inzeo brothers were competing in their fifth Games; they would be the first people to compete in eight. Also returning was 1952 gold medalist Pierre Jonquéres d'Oriola of France, in his fourth Games. The five men who had won, or would win, the first seven World Championships were present: Paco Goyoaga of Spain (1953), Winkler (1954 and 1955), Raimondo D'Inzeo (1956 and 1960), Jonquéres d'Oriola (1966), and Broome (1970).

For the first time, no nations made their debut in the event. France competed for the 11th time, most of any nation, having missed the individual jumping only in 1932.

== Competition format ==
The competition used the two-round format introduced in 1952. The scores from the two rounds were summed to give a final total. The team and individual jumping competitions used the same results.

The course was 780 metres long with 14 obstacles, including a double jump and a triple jump for 17 total jumps. The last two obstacles were a 5 metre wide water jump and a large oxer. Penalty points were received for obstacle faults (3, 4, 6, or 8 points based on severity) or exceeding the time limit (0.25 points per second or fraction thereof over the limit). A third refusal or jumping an obstacle out of order resulted in elimination.

== Schedule ==
All times are Japan Standard Time (UTC+9)

| Date | Time | Round |
|---|---|---|
| Saturday, 24 October 1964 | 7:30 | Round 1 Round 2 |

== Results ==
The tie for third place was broken by a jump-off. Robeson scored a 0.00 penalty in that jump-off to take 3rd, while Fahey's 8.00 penalty put him in 4th. Other ties were not broken.

| Rank | Rider | Horse | Nation | Round 1 | Round 2 | Total |
|---|---|---|---|---|---|---|
| 1st place, gold medalist(s) | Pierre Jonquères d'Oriola | Lutteur B | France | 9.00 | 0.00 | 9.00 |
| 2nd place, silver medalist(s) | Hermann Schridde | Dozen II | United Team of Germany | 12.50 | 1.25 | 13.75 |
| 3rd place, bronze medalist(s) | Peter Robeson | Firecrest | Great Britain | 8.00 | 8.00 | 16.00 |
| 4 | John Fahey | Bonvale | Australia | 8.00 | 8.00 | 16.00 |
| 5 | Joaquim Duarte | Jeune France | Portugal | 8.00 | 12.00 | 20.00 |
| 5 | Nelson Pessoa | Huipil | Brazil | 12.00 | 8.00 | 20.00 |
| 7 | Frank Chapot | San Lucas | United States | 12.50 | 8.00 | 20.50 |
| 8 | Kurt Jarasinski | Torro | United Team of Germany | 9.75 | 12.50 | 22.25 |
| 9 | Piero D'Inzeo | Sun Beam | Italy | 12.00 | 12.50 | 22.50 |
| 10 | Max Hauri | Millview | Switzerland | 13.25 | 12.25 | 25.50 |
| 11 | Raimondo D'Inzeo | Posillipo | Italy | 16.00 | 12.00 | 28.00 |
| 12 | Jorge Canavas | Confinado | Argentina | 18.75 | 10.75 | 29.50 |
| 13 | Kathryn Kusner | Untouchable | United States | 13.75 | 16.00 | 29.75 |
| 14 | Janou Lefevre | Kenavo D | France | 16.00 | 16.00 | 32.00 |
| 14 | Paul Weier | Satan III | Switzerland | 20.00 | 12.00 | 32.00 |
| 16 | Hans-Gunter Winkler | Fidelitas | United Team of Germany | 17.50 | 15.00 | 32.50 |
| 17 | Hugo Miguel Arrambide | Chimbote | Argentina | 17.50 | 16.75 | 34.25 |
| 18 | Francisco Goyoaga | Kif-Kif B. | Spain | 19.00 | 16.00 | 35.00 |
| 19 | Graziano Mancinelli | Rockette | Italy | 16.00 | 20.00 | 36.00 |
| 20 | Guy Lefrant | Monsieur de Littry | France | 20.00 | 16.75 | 36.75 |
| 21 | David Broome | Jacopo | Great Britain | 16.00 | 21.00 | 37.00 |
| 22 | Carlos Delia | Popin | Argentina | 17.25 | 20.00 | 37.25 |
| 23 | Graeme Hansen | Saba Sam | New Zealand | 12.75 | 25.00 | 37.75 |
| 24 | Bridget MacIntyre | Coronation | Australia | 16.00 | 23.50 | 39.50 |
| 25 | E. Martinez de Vallejo | Eolo IV | Spain | 24.00 | 16.00 | 40.00 |
| 26 | A. Queipo de Llano | Infernal | Spain | 20.00 | 23.75 | 43.75 |
| 27 | David B. Barker | North Flight | Great Britain | 28.25 | 16.00 | 44.25 |
| 28 | Ivan Semyonov | Sibiriak | Soviet Union | 24.50 | 27.00 | 51.50 |
| 29 | Américo Simonetti | Trago Amargo | Chile | 32.25 | 20.00 | 52.25 |
| 30 | Kevin Bacon | Ocean Foam | Australia | 29.50 | 24.00 | 53.50 |
| 31 | Bruce Hansen | Tide | New Zealand | 24.00 | 32.00 | 56.00 |
| 31 | Lee Il-gyu | Rebel | South Korea | 28.00 | 28.00 | 56.00 |
| 33 | Mary Mairs-Chapot | Tomboy | United States | 44.50 | 12.25 | 56.75 |
| 34 | Henrique Alves | Joe de l'Ile | Portugal | 42.00 | 16.25 | 58.25 |
| 35 | Adrian White | El Dorado | New Zealand | 37.25 | 25.25 | 62.50 |
| 36 | Aleksandr Purtov | Svecha | Soviet Union | 56.25 | 12.50 | 68.75 |
| 37 | Ricardo Guasch | Huracan | Mexico | 33.75 | 36.00 | 69.75 |
| 38 | Shinzo Sasa | Snaefell | Japan | 46.75 | 24.00 | 70.75 |
| 39 | Hans Moehr | Troll | Switzerland | 32.00 | 51.25 | 83.25 |
| 40 | Hiroshi Hoketsu | Raro | Japan | 63.75 | 48.00 | 111.75 |
| — | Andrey Favorsky | Manevr | Soviet Union | 22.25 | Elim. | DNF |
| — | Héctor Zatarain | Nube | Mexico | 66.25 | Elim. | DNF |
| — | Kageyama Yuzo | Tokinoarashi | Japan | Elim. | Elim. | DNF |
| — | Kim Cheol-gyu | Gothic | South Korea | Elim. | Elim. | DNF |
| — | Joaquín Hermida | Porfirio | Mexico | Elim. | Elim. | DNF |
| — | An Deok-gi | Ivan | South Korea | DNF | Elim. | DNF |

== Sources ==
- Tokyo Organizing Committee (1964). The Games of the XVIII Olympiad: Tokyo 1964, vol. 2.
