= Equestrian at the 1964 Summer Olympics – Team jumping =

Equestrian at the Olympics

Team jumping at the Games of the XVIII Olympiad
- Venue: National Stadium
- Date: 24 October 1964
- Competitors: 42 from 14 nations
- Winning total: 68.50 faults

Medalists
| 1st place, gold medalist(s) | | Hermann Schridde, Kurt Jarasinski, Hans Günter Winkler; United Team of Germany |
| 2nd place, silver medalist(s) | | Pierre Jonquères d'Oriola, Janou Lefèbvre, Guy Lefrant; France |
| 3rd place, bronze medalist(s) | | Piero D'Inzeo, Raimondo D'Inzeo, Graziano Mancinelli; Italy |

The team jumping was an equestrian event held as part of the Equestrian at the 1964 Summer Olympics programme. The event was held on 24 October 1964, and consisted merely of summing the scores of the team's 3 horse and rider pairs in the individual jumping event.

== Results ==
Pairs not completing the first round were assigned a penalty of 86.25; those not completing the second received a 71.25.

| | Hermann Schridde on Dozen II (EUA) | 68.50 | 13.75 |
| | Kurt Jarasinski on Torro (EUA) | 68.50 | 22.25 |
| | Hans Günter Winkler on Fidelitas (EUA) | 68.50 | 32.50 |
| | Pierre Jonquères d'Oriola on Lutteur B (FRA) | 77.75 | 9.00 |
| | Janou Lefèbvre on Kenavo D (FRA) | 77.75 | 32.00 |
| | Guy Lefrant on Monsieur de Littry (FRA) | 77.75 | 36.75 |
| | Piero D'Inzeo on Sun Beam (ITA) | 88.50 | 24.50 |
| | Raimondo D'Inzeo on Posillipo (ITA) | 88.50 | 28.00 |
| | Graziano Mancinelli on Rockette (ITA) | 88.50 | 36.00 |
| 4. | Peter Robeson on Firecrest (GBR) | 97.25 | 16.00 |
| 4. | David Broome on Jacopo (GBR) | 97.25 | 37.00 |
| 4. | David B. Barker on North Flight (GBR) | 97.25 | 44.25 |
| 5. | Jorge Canaves on Confinado (ARG) | 101.00 | 29.50 |
| 5. | Hugo Miguel Arrambide on Chimbote (ARG) | 101.00 | 34.25 |
| 5. | Carlos Delia on Popin (ARG) | 101.00 | 37.25 |
| 6. | Frank Chapot on San Lucas (USA) | 107.00 | 20.50 |
| 6. | Kathryn Kusner on Untouchable (USA) | 107.00 | 29.75 |
| 6. | Mary Mairs on Tomboy (USA) | 107.00 | 56.75 |
| 7. | Thomas Fahey on Bonvale (AUS) | 109.00 | 16.00 |
| 7. | Bridget MacIntyre on Coronation (AUS) | 109.00 | 39.50 |
| 7. | Kevin Bacon on Ocean Foam (AUS) | 109.00 | 53.50 |
| 8. | Francisco Goyoaga on Kif-Kif B. (ESP) | 118.75 | 35.00 |
| 8. | E. Martinez de Vallajo on Eolo IV (ESP) | 118.75 | 40.00 |
| 8. | A. Quiepo de Llano on Infernal (ESP) | 118.75 | 43.75 |
| 9. | Max Hauri on Millview (SUI) | 140.75 | 25.50 |
| 9. | Paul Weier on Satan III (SUI) | 140.75 | 32.00 |
| 9. | Hans Mochr on Troll (SUI) | 140.75 | 83.25 |
| 10. | Graeme Hansen on Saba Sam (NZL) | 156.25 | 37.75 |
| 10. | Bruce Hansen on Tide (NZL) | 156.25 | 56.00 |
| 10. | Adrian White on El Dorado (NZL) | 156.25 | 62.50 |
| 11. | Ivan Semyonov on Sibiriak (URS) | 213.75 | 51.50 |
| 11. | Alexandr Purtov on Svecha (URS) | 213.75 | 68.75 |
| 11. | Andrey Favorsky on Manevr (URS) | 213.75 | 93.50 |
| 12. | Sasa Shinzo on Snaefel (JPN) | 340.00 | 70.75 |
| 12. | Hoketsu Hiroshi on Raro (JPN) | 340.00 | 111.75 |
| 12. | Kageyama Yuzo on Tokinoarashi (JPN) | 340.00 | 157.50 |
| 13. | Ricardo Guash on Hurakan (MEX) | 364.75 | 69.75 |
| 13. | Hector Zatarain on Nube (MEX) | 364.75 | 137.50 |
| 13. | Joaquin Hermida on Porfirio (MEX) | 364.75 | 157.50 |
| 14. | Lee Il Kyu on Rebel (KOR) | 371.00 | 56.00 |
| 14. | Kim Chul Kyu on Gothic (KOR) | 371.00 | 157.50 |
| 14. | Ahn Duk Kee on Ivan (KOR) | 371.00 | 157.50 |

== Sources ==
- Tokyo Organizing Committee (1964). The Games of the XVIII Olympiad: Tokyo 1964, vol. 2.
