= Equestrian at the 1968 Summer Olympics – Individual jumping =

Individual jumping at the Games of the XIX Olympiad
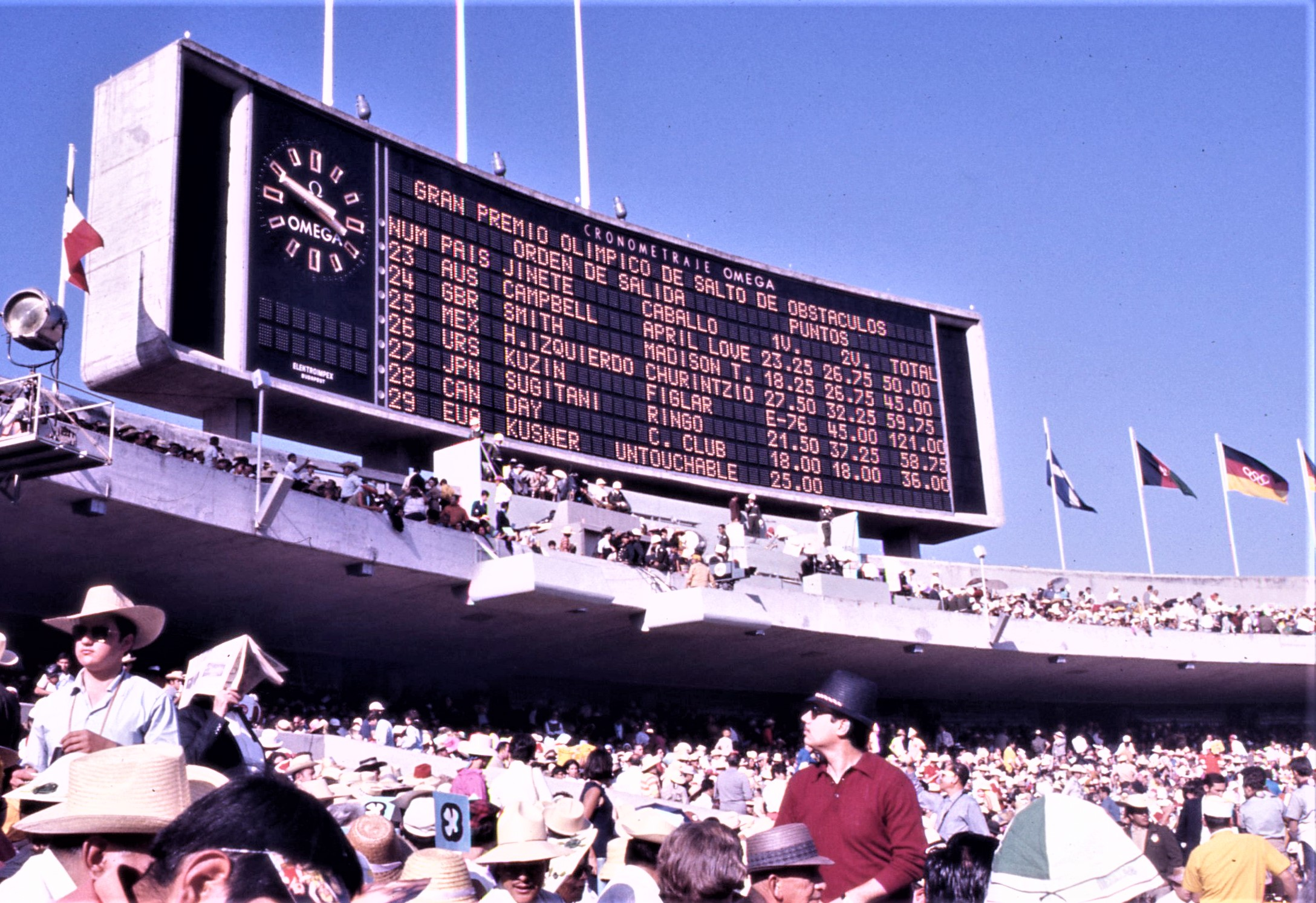
- Scoreboard showing partial results of the team event
- Venue: Campo Marte
- Date: 23 October 1968
- Competitors: 42 from 15 nations
- Winning total: 4 faults

Medalists
1st place, gold medalist(s)		William Steinkraus; United States
2nd place, silver medalist(s)		Marion Coakes; Great Britain
3rd place, bronze medalist(s)		David Broome; Great Britain

The individual show jumping at the 1968 Summer Olympics took place on 23 October. The event was open to men and women. There were 42 competitors from 15 nations. Each nation was limited to three riders. The event was won by William Steinkraus of the United States, the nation's first medal in individual jumping. Marion Coakes of Great Britain was the first female rider to win a medal in individual jumping, taking silver. Great Britain also earned its third consecutive bronze medal in the event, with David Broome earning his second (after 1960) to become the fifth person to win multiple medals in the event.

== Background ==
This was the 13th appearance of the event, which had first been held at the 1900 Summer Olympics and has been held at every Summer Olympics at which equestrian sports have been featured (that is, excluding 1896, 1904, and 1908). It is the oldest event on the current programme, the only one that was held in 1900. The team and individual results were once again separated; they had been combined from 1924 to 1956, separate in 1960, and combined again in 1964.

Six of the top 10 riders from the 1964 competition returned: two-time (1952 and 1964) gold medalist Pierre Jonquères d'Oriola of France, fourth-place finisher John Fahey of Australia, fifth-place finisher Nelson Pessoa of Brazil, seventh-place finisher Frank Chapot of the United States, ninth-place finisher Piero D'Inzeo of Italy, and tenth-place finisher Max Hauri of Switzerland. Also returning was D'Inzeo's brother Raimondo D'Inzeo. Raimondo had won the 1960 gold and 1956 silver medals; Piero had won the 1960 silver and 1956 bronze medals. The brothers were competing in their sixth Olympics; they would be the first to reach eight Games. Jonquères d'Oriola was competing in his fifth. Hans Günter Winkler, who had competed three times for the United Team of Germany and won gold in 1956, was also in Mexico City and now competing for West Germany. The reigning World Champion, who had also earned Olympic bronze in 1960, was David Broome of Great Britain. Thus, the field included the last four Olympic gold medalists (Jonquères d'Oriola, Winkler, R. D'Inzeo, and Jonquères d'Oriola again) and last six World Champions (Winkler twice, R. D'Inzeo twice, Jonquères d'Oriola, and Broome).

Bolivia, Canada, and West Germany each made their debut in the event. France competed for the 12th time, most of any nation, having missed the individual jumping only in 1932.

== Competition format ==
There were two rounds, as had been the case since 1952, but the format had been tweaked. Instead of two rounds on the same course, now there were two different courses. Moreover, instead of all riders who finished the first round competing again, now only the top 18 riders (or all riders with 8 or fewer faults, if there were more than 18) advanced to the second round. The first course was 750 metres long; the second was a more puissance-styled course of 410 metres. The total score from both rounds determined final rankings. There was a jump-off for the bronze medal, with the time in the jump-off used as a tie-breaker if riders were still tied (as all were). The jump-off course was 370 metres.

== Schedule ==
All times are Central Standard Time (UTC-6)

Date	Time	Round
Wednesday, 23 October 1968	10:00; 14:00	Round 1 Round 2

== Results ==
42 riders competed. Broome's horse Mr. Softee would later appear in the Monty Python's Flying Circus episode "Archaeology Today" "Trailer sketch" in 1970, though Anneli Drummond-Hay was riding the horse rather than Broome. All four of the riders in the jump-off completed the course cleanly, so time was the deciding factor.

Rank	Rider	Horse	Nation	Faults			Jump-off time
Rank	Rider	Horse	Nation	Round 1	Round 2	Total	Jump-off time
1st place, gold medalist(s)	William Steinkraus	Snowbound	United States	0	4	4	—
2nd place, silver medalist(s)	Marion Coakes	Stroller	Great Britain	0	8	8	—
3rd place, bronze medalist(s)	David Broome	Mr. Softee	Great Britain	4	8	12	35.3
4	Frank Chapot	San Lucas	United States	4	8	12	36.8
5	Hans Günter Winkler	Enigk	West Germany	8	4	12	37.5
6	Jim Elder	The Immigrant	Canada	8	4	12	39.2
7	Alwin Schockemöhle	Donald Rex	West Germany	8	8	16	—
7	Argentino Molinuevo Jr.	Don Gustavo	Argentina	8	8	16	—
7	Piero D'Inzeo	Fidux	Italy	4	12	16	—
7	Monica Bachmann	Erbach	Switzerland	8	8	16	—
11	Harvey Smith	Madison Time	Great Britain	8	8.25	16.25	—
12	Lucia Faria	Rush du Camp	Brazil	7.25	12	19.25	—
13	Carlos César Delía	Scandale	Argentina	8	12	20	—
13	Arthur Blickenstorfer	Marianka	Switzerland	8	12	20	—
13	Jim Day	Canadian Club	Canada	4	16	20	—
16	Nelson Pessoa	Pass-Op	Brazil	8	16	24	—
17	Pierre D'Oriola	Nagir	France	8	20.5	28.5	—
18	Kevin Bacon	Chichester	Australia	4	24.75	28.75	—
19	Fernando Hernández	Churintzio	Mexico	10.75	Did not advance		—
20	Marcel Rozier	Quo Vadis	France	11	Did not advance		—
21	Paul Weier	Wildfeuer	Switzerland	12	Did not advance		—
21	Kathryn Kusner	Untouchable	United States	12	Did not advance		—
21	Graziano Mancinelli	Doneraile	Italy	12	Did not advance		—
21	Ricardo Guasch	Mixteco	Mexico	12	Did not advance		—
21	John Fahey	Bon Vale	Australia	12	Did not advance		—
26	Tadashi Fukushima	Queen	Japan	16	Did not advance		—
26	Hartwig Steenken	Simona	West Germany	16	Did not advance		—
26	Raimondo D'Inzeo	Bellevue	Italy	16	Did not advance		—
26	Viktor Matveyev	Krojotnyi	Soviet Union	16	Did not advance		—
26	Sam Campbell	April Love	Australia	16	Did not advance		—
26	Masayasu Sugitani	Ringo	Japan	16	Did not advance		—
32	Janou Lefèbvre	Rocket	France	20	Did not advance		—
33	José Fernandez	Cantal	Brazil	23.25	Did not advance		—
34	Roberto Nielsen-Reyes	Ukamau	Bolivia	24	Did not advance		—
35	Marian Kozicki	Braz	Poland	28	Did not advance		—
36	Torchy Millar	Beefeater	Canada	31.5	Did not advance		—
37	Joaquín Pérez de las H.	Romeo	Mexico	36.5	Did not advance		—
38	Antoni Pacyński	Cirrus	Poland	37.25	Did not advance		—
39	Piotr Wawryniuk	Farys	Poland	52.75	Did not advance		—
—	Jorge Amaya	Gemelo	Argentina	DSQ	Did not advance		—
—	Yevgeny Kuzin	Figlar	Soviet Union	DSQ	Did not advance		—
—	Yugo Araki	Far East	Japan	DSQ	Did not advance		—
