= Equestrian at the 1968 Summer Olympics – Team jumping =

Equestrian at the Olympics

Team jumping at the Games of the XIX Olympiad
- Venue: Estadio Olímpico Universitario
- Date: 24 October 1968
- Competitors: 24 from 8 nations

Medalists
1st place, gold medalist(s)		CANADA	Canada
2nd place, silver medalist(s)		FRANCE	France
3rd place, bronze medalist(s)		WEST GERMANY	West Germany

The team jumping at the 1968 Summer Olympics took place on 27 October, at the Estadio Olímpico Universitario. The event was open to men and women.

== Competition format ==
The team jumping competition did not use the same scores as the individual jumping, unlike the other two forms of equestrian competition. Instead, the team jumping was completely separate. Teams consisted of three horse and rider pairs. Two rounds were held, with the scores for each round for each rider and horse pair being summed to give a team score.

== Results ==
14 teams, or 42 riders, competed.

Rank	Nation	Individual results									Team results		
Rank	Nation	Rider	Horse	R1 Obstacles	R1 Time	R1 Total	R2 Obstacles	R2 Time	R2 Total	Total	R1 Team Total	R2 Team Total	Team Total
1st place, gold medalist(s)	Canada	Jim Elder	The Immigrant	8	1.25	9.25	16	2	18	27.25	49.5	53.25	102.75
1st place, gold medalist(s)	Canada	Jim Day	Canadian Club	16	2	18	16	2	18	36	49.5	53.25	102.75
1st place, gold medalist(s)	Canada	Thomas Gayford,	Big Dee	20	2.25	22.25	16	1.25	17.25	39.5	49.5	53.25	102.75
2nd place, silver medalist(s)	France	Janou Lefèbvre	Rocket	16	1.25	17.25	12	0.5	12.5	29.75	56.5	53.75	110.25
2nd place, silver medalist(s)	France	Marcel Rozier	Quo Vadis	20	1.5	21.5	12	0	12	33.5	56.5	53.75	110.25
2nd place, silver medalist(s)	France	Pierre D'Oriola	Nagir	16	1.75	17.75	28	1.25	29.25	47	56.5	53.75	110.25
3rd place, bronze medalist(s)	West Germany	Alwin Schockemöhle	Donald Rex	12	1	13	4	1.75	5.75	18.75	58.25	59	117.25
3rd place, bronze medalist(s)	West Germany	Hans Günter Winkler	Enigk	8	3.5	11.5	12	4.75	16.75	28.25	58.25	59	117.25
3rd place, bronze medalist(s)	West Germany	Hermann Schridde	Dozent	32	1.75	33.75	36	0.5	36.5	70.25	58.25	59	117.25
4	United States	Frank Chapot	San Lucas	8	3	11	12	2	14	25	63	54.5	117.5
4	United States	Kathryn Kusner	Untouchable	20	5	25	16	3.5	19.5	44.5	63	54.5	117.5
4	United States	Mary Chapot	White Lightning	24	3	27	20	1	21	48	63	54.5	117.5
5	Italy	Raimondo D'Inzeo	Bellevue	12	0	12	12	0.25	12.25	24.25	64	65.25	129.25
5	Italy	Piero D'Inzeo	Fidux	24	4.5	28.5	16	3	19	47.5	64	65.25	129.25
5	Italy	Graziano Mancinelli	Doneraile	20	3.5	23.5	32	2	34	57.5	64	65.25	129.25
6	Switzerland	Paul Weier	Satan	19	4.5	23.5	12	1.25	13.25	36.75	68.25	68.5	136.75
6	Switzerland	Monica Bachmann-Weier	Erbach	15	8	23	24	2.5	26.5	49.5	68.25	68.5	136.75
6	Switzerland	Arthur Blickenstorfer	Marianka	20	1.75	21.75	28	0.75	28.75	50.5	68.25	68.5	136.75
7	Brazil	Nelson Pessoa	Pass-Op	24	4.5	28.5	8	2.25	10.25	38.75	81	57	138
7	Brazil	Lucía Faria	Rush du Camp	20	4.75	24.75	16	4	20	44.75	81	57	138
7	Brazil	José Reynoso	Cantal	24	3.75	27.75	24	2.75	26.75	54.5	81	57	138
8	Great Britain	David Broome	Mr. Softee	8	0	8	12	0	12	20	48	111.5	159.5
8	Great Britain	Harvey Smith	Madison Time	16	2.25	18.25	24	2.75	26.75	45	48	111.5	159.5
8	Great Britain	Marion Coakes	Stroller	15	6.75	21.75	DSQ	72.75	72.75	94.5	48	111.5	159.5
9	Australia	John Fahey	Bon Vale	20	1.25	21.25	20	1.5	21.5	42.75	70.5	96	166.5
9	Australia	Samuel Campbell	April Love	20	3.75	23.75	24	2.75	26.75	50.5	70.5	96	166.5
9	Australia	Kevin Bacon	Chichester	24	1.5	25.5	27	20.75	47.75	73.25	70.5	96	166.5
10	Mexico	Fernando Hernández	Churintzio	20	7.5	27.5	28	4.25	32.25	59.75	114.5	95	209.5
10	Mexico	Joaquín Pérez de las H.	Nancel	28	3	31	28	4	32	63	114.5	95	209.5
10	Mexico	Ricardo Guasch	Mixteco	41	15	56	28	2.75	30.75	86.75	114.5	95	209.5
11	Poland	Piotr Wawryniuk	Poprad	32	5	37	20	3.25	23.25	60.25	123.5	99.75	223.25
11	Poland	Jan Kowalczyk	Braz	44	1.25	45.25	20	3.75	23.75	69	123.5	99.75	223.25
11	Poland	Antoni Pacynski	Cirrus	36	5.25	41.25	37	15.75	52.75	94	123.5	99.75	223.25
12	Soviet Union	Victor Matveev	Krojotnyi	20	3.75	23.75	16	1.75	17.75	41.5	125	105.5	230.5
12	Soviet Union	Gennady Samosedenko	Aeron	15	10.25	25.25	40	2.75	42.75	68	125	105.5	230.5
12	Soviet Union	Evgeny Kuzin	Figlar	DSQ	76	76	39	6	45	121	125	105.5	230.5
13	Argentina	Carlos César Delía	Scandale	24	3.25	27.25	35	6.25	41.25	68.5	113.5	161.5	275
13	Argentina	Roberto Tagle	Ojo Chico	43	11.5	54.5	40	7.5	47.5	102	113.5	161.5	275
13	Argentina	Argentino Molinuevo Jr.	Don Gustavo	28	3.75	31.75	DSQ	72.75	72.75	104.5	113.5	161.5	275
14	Japan	Masayasu Sugitani	Ringo	20	1.5	21.5	31	6.25	37.25	58.75	136	147.25	283.25
14	Japan	Tadashi Fukushima	Queen	36	2.5	38.5	36	1.25	37.25	75.75	136	147.25	283.25
14	Japan	Yugo Araki	Fokker	DSQ	76	76	DSQ	72.75	72.75	148.75	136	147.25	283.25
