= David Barker =

David Barker may refer to:

- David Barker Jr. (1797–1834), U.S. Representative from New Hampshire
- David Barker (epidemiologist) (1938–2013), English physician and epidemiologist
- David Barker (equestrian) (1935–2018), British Olympic equestrian
- David Barker (zoologist) (1922–2009), British zoologist and neurologist
- David Barker (cricketer) (born 1951), English cricketer
- David E. Barker (1836–1914), state legislator in Arkansas
- David R. Barker (born 1961), American author, academic and businessman
- Dave Barker (born 1947), Jamaican singer
- David Barker Stevenson (1801–1859), Canadian businessman
- David B. Barker (1943–2022), British Olympic equestrian
- David G. Barker (born 1952), American herpetologist
