= Amaya (surname) =

Amaya is a surname found in the Japanese and Spanish languages. Notable people with the surname include:

== People with Japanese-language surname ==
- Naohiro Amaya (天谷 直弘; 1925–1994), Japanese politician
- Daisuke Amaya (天谷 大輔; born 1977), Japanese software developer
- Sohichiro Amaya (天谷 宗一郎; born 1983), Japanese baseball player
- Tsubame Amaya (雨夜 燕), a fictional character in the game Gakuen Idolmaster

== People with Spanish-language surname ==
- Andrés Amaya (c.1645–1704), Spanish Baroque painter.
- Manuel de Amaya (c.1740–c.1800), Spanish merchant and politician.
- Lorenzo Amaya (1896–1969), Argentine sports shooter.
- Carmen Amaya (1913/1914–1963), Spanish Romani flamenco dancer and singer.
- Ramón Amaya Amador (1916–1966), Honduran journalist, author, and political activist.
- Mario Amaya (1933–1986), American art critic, museum director and magazine editor, and director.
- Dionisia Amaya (1933–2004), was a teacher and Honduran Garifuna community activist.
- Jorge Amaya (1934–2021), Argentine equestrian.
- Angel Amaya (born 1934), Venezuelan boxer.
- Mario Abel Amaya (1935–1976), Argentine lawyer and politician and reformist activist.
- Rufina Amaya (1943–2007), Salvadoran survivor.
- Roberto Amaya (born 1944), Argentine boxer.
- Antonio Amaya (boxer) (1945–2025), Panamanian boxer.
- George Amaya (1950–2005), American professional tennis player of Colombian descent
- María Elvia Amaya Araujo (1954–2012), Mexican psychologist, philanthropist, and politician.
- Victor Amaya (born 1954), American retired tennis player.
- Victoria Amaya, Argentine indoor hockey player
- Efraín Amaya (born 1959), Venezuelan-born American composer.
- Remedios Amaya (born 1962), Spanish flamenco singer.
- Jesús Amaya (born 1969), Colombian professional golfer.
- Ashraf Amaya (born 1971), retired American professional basketball player.
- Alexander Amaya (born 1975), Salvadoran professional footballer.
- Alejandro Amaya (born 1977), Mexican matador.
- Rafael Amaya (born 1977), Mexican actor.
- Iván Amaya (born 1978), Spanish retired footballer.
- Dolores Amaya (born 1980), Argentine rower.
- José Amaya (born 1980), Colombian footballer.
- Antonio Amaya (born 1983), Spanish professional footballer.
- Zuleima Amaya (born 1985), Venezuelan marathon runner.
- Waleska Amaya (born 1986), Honduran footballer.
- Cristina Amaya (born 1988), Colombian racquetball player.
- Jonathon Amaya (born 1988), former American football safety.
- Jacob Amaya (born 1998), American professional baseball player.
- Frankie Amaya (born 2000), American professional soccer player.
- Andrea Amaya (born 2003), Salvadoran footballer.
- Queen Amaya, a fictional character from the animated film Wish
- Amaya, a fictional character from the series Devs, daughter of Lianne and Forest and eponym of her father's murderous tech company
