= Fernando Hernández =

Fernando Hernández may refer to:

- Fernando Hernández (footballer), Costa Rican footballer
- Fernando Hernández (baseball, born 1984), Major League Baseball pitcher
- Fernando Hernández (baseball, born 1971), former Major League Baseball pitcher
- Fernando Hernández (equestrian) (born 1924), Mexican Olympic equestrian
- Fernando Hernández (handballer) (born 1973), Spanish Olympic handball player
- Fernando Hernández Leyva (born 1964), Mexican serial killer
- Fernando Hernández Vega (1914–1988), Mexican military aviator
- Fernando Hernández (volleyball), Cuban volleyball player
