= Vittorio Orlandi =

Italian equestrian

Personal information
- Nationality: Italian
- Born: 8 September 1938 (age 87) Rome, Italy
- Height: 1.71 m (5 ft 7 1/2 in)
- Weight: 65 kg (143 lb)

Sport
- Country: Italy
- Sport: Equestrianism
- Event: Show jumping
Medal record
Summer Olympics
Bronze medal – third place	1972 München	Team jumping

Vittorio Orlandi (born 8 September 1938, in Rome) was an Italian show jumping rider.

== Biography ==
He won bronze medal in team jumping at the 1972 Summer Olympics with Raimondo D'Inzeo, Piero D'Inzeo and Graziano Mancinelli.

== See also ==
- Italy national equestrianism team
