= D'Inzeo =

D'Inzeo is an Italian surname. Notable people with the surname include:

- Piero D'Inzeo (1923–2014), Italian show jumping rider
- Raimondo D'Inzeo (1925–2013), Italian show jumping rider, brother of Piero
