= Bridget Hyem =

Australian equestrian

Personal information
- Born: Bridget Anne Hyem; 26 September 1933 Muswellbrook, New South Wales, Australia
- Died: 3 March 2014 (aged 80) Tamworth, New South Wales, Australia

Sport
- Country: Australia
- Sport: Equestrianism
- Event: Show jumping

Bridget Anne Hyem (26 September 1933 – 3 March 2014), née MacIntyre and known as Bud, was the first female equestrian to represent Australia at an Olympic Games.

She competed at the 1964 Summer Olympics in Tokyo, Japan. Riding Coronation, Hyem finished 24th in the individual jumping event.

The Australian team, comprising Kevin Bacon, John Fahey and Hyem, finished seventh in the team jumping event.

Hyem is also known as the breeder of two Olympic gold medal-winning horses, Kibah Tic-Toc and Kibah Sandstone. Both horses were ridden to success by Matt Ryan.

In the lead up to the Sydney 2000 Olympics, she rode Tic-Toc in the torch relay.

== Personal ==
Hyem was born in 1933 in Muswellbrook, New South Wales. She married fellow showjumper, Bill Hyem in Tokyo, after competing in the Games. She died in Tamworth Hospital on 3 March 2014.
