= Ramón de Amaya =

Colonel Ramón de Amaya

Personal details
- Born: Ramón Roman Joseph Lorenzo de Amaya y Zenzano; August 9, 1783 Buenos Aires, Argentina
- Died: c. 1870 Cordón, Uruguay
- Spouse: Valentina Josefa Galán
- Occupation: army government trade
- Profession: military man

Military service
- Allegiance: (Spanish Empire) Spain – until 1810 (Argentina) United Provinces of South America (Uruguay) Gobierno de la Defensa
- Years of service: c. 1798-1840s
- Rank: Colonel
- Unit: Fuerte de Buenos Aires; Fuerte de Montevideo
- Commands: Regimiento de Infanteria de Buenos Aires
- Battles/wars: Battle of Montevideo (1807); Great Siege of Montevideo

Ramón de Amaya (1783 - c. 1870) was an Argentine-Uruguayan military man and politician, who fought against the English during the British invasions of the River Plate, and who participated in the Uruguayan Civil War.

== Biography ==
Ramón Roman Joseph Lorenzo de Amaya y Zenzano was born in Buenos Aires, the son of Manuel de Amaya and Valentina Zenzano, belonging to a distinguished Spanish family. He made his military career in the Regimiento de Infanteria de Buenos Aires, taking an active part during the English Invasions of 1806 and 1807, where he served with the rank of captain. He settled in the Cordón neighborhood of Montevideo, where he ventured into politics and also in the commerce, owner of a pulperia in the area of Buceo.

He had a long career as a politician of the Banda Oriental, participating in the early 19th century of meetings with the main political leaders of Montevideo. It is unknown which political party he belonged to, although during the siege of Manuel Oribe he served in the Gobierno de la Defensa.

== Family ==
He was married in Buenos Aires to Valentina Josefa Galán, daughter of Felix Galan born in Alicante, and Manuela García de la Paz, born in Montevideo. He was the father of Manuel Amaya, a soldier who served under General Juan Antonio Lavalleja, and Cipriana Amaya, married to Sergeant Major Benito Silva, a military man who was captured by Charruas tribes in 1825.

Ramón de Amaya was the grandson of Joseph Zenzano, a Spanish jurist who served as Notary Mayor of Government of the Viceroyalty of the Río de la Plata. Among his goddaughters were Cipriana Canavery, daughter of Quintina Páez and Lieutenant Sinforoso Canavery, an Argentine military who served under Manuel Oribe during the Siege of Montevideo.
