= Italy national equestrian team =

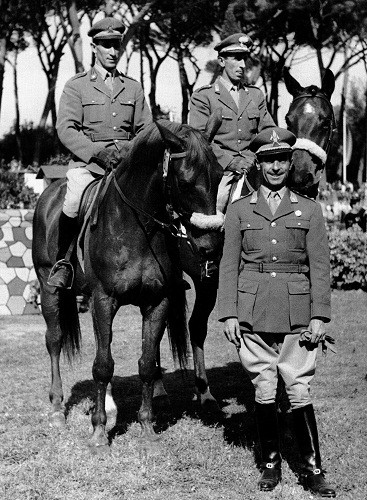
Italian brotheres Piero and Raimondo D'Inzeo (by left on horses), 12 medals at the Summer Olympics and 8 appearances each.

The Italy national equestrian team represents Italy in International Equestrian competitions such as Olympic Games or World Equestrian Championships.

== History ==
The national Italian Equestrian team participated to all the Summer Olympics editions, from Paris 1900, 21 times on 23.

== Medal tables ==
Event	Editions	1st edition	Gold medal	Silver medal	Bronze medal	Tot.	Ranking
Olympic Games	21	1900	7	9	7	23	7th
World Equestrian Games	9	1990	5	5	4	14	8th

== Olympic Games ==
Since the 1980 Summer Olympics in Moscow, the Italian national equestrian team has not won a medal in the Olympic Games.

Edition	Gold	Silver	Bronze	Total
(France) Paris 1900	High jump Gian Giorgio Trissino			2
(France) Paris 1900		Long jump Gian Giorgio Trissino		2
(Belgium) Antwerp 1920			Individual eventing Ettore Caffaratti	5
(Belgium) Antwerp 1920		Team eventing Ettore Caffaratti; Garibaldi Spighi; Giulio Cacciandra; Carlo Asinari		5
(Belgium) Antwerp 1920	Individual jumping Tommaso Lequio di Assaba	Individual jumping Alessandro Valerio		5
(Belgium) Antwerp 1920			Team jumping Ettore Caffaratti; Alessandro Alvisi; Giulio Cacciandra; Carlo Asinari	5
(France) Paris 1924			Team eventing Alberto Lombardi; Alessandro Alvisi; Emanuele Beraudo di Pralormo; Tommaso Lequio di Assaba	2
(France) Paris 1924		Individual jumping Tommaso Lequio di Assaba		2
(Sweden) Stockholm 1956		Individual jumping Raimondo D'Inzeo	Individual jumping Piero D'Inzeo	3
(Sweden) Stockholm 1956		Team jumping Raimondo D'Inzeo; Piero D'Inzeo; Salvatore Oppes		3
(Italy) Rome 1960	Individual jumping Raimondo D'Inzeo	Individual jumping Piero D'Inzeo		3
(Italy) Rome 1960			Team jumping Raimondo D'Inzeo; Piero D'Inzeo; Antonio Oppes	3
(Japan) Tokyo 1964	Individual eventing Mauro Checcoli			3
(Japan) Tokyo 1964	Team eventing Mauro Checcoli; Paolo Angioni; Giuseppe Ravano			3
(Japan) Tokyo 1964			Team jumping Raimondo D'Inzeo; Piero D'Inzeo; Graziano Mancinelli	3
(West Germany) Munich 1972		Individual eventing Alessandro Argenton		3
(West Germany) Munich 1972	Individual jumping Graziano Mancinelli			3
(West Germany) Munich 1972			Team jumping Raimondo D'Inzeo; Piero D'Inzeo; Graziano Mancinelli; Vittorio Orlandi	3
(Soviet Union) Moscow 1980	Individual eventing Federico Roman			2
(Soviet Union) Moscow 1980		Team eventing Federico Roman; Anna Casagrande; Mauro Roman; Marina Sciocchetti		2
	7	9	7	23

== Multiple medalists ==
=== Olympic Games ===
Sorted by individual gold medals.

#	Fencer	Individual			Team			Total		
#	Fencer	Gold medal	Silver medal	Bronze medal	Gold medal	Silver medal	Bronze medal	Gold medal	Silver medal	Bronze medal
1	Raimondo D'Inzeo	1	1	0	0	1	3	1	2	3
2	Gian Giorgio Trissino	1	1	0	0	0	0	1	1	0
3	Mauro Checcoli	1	0	0	1	0	0	2	0	0
4	Federico Roman	1	0	0	0	1	0	1	1	0
5	Graziano Mancinelli	1	0	0	0	0	2	1	0	2
6	Tommaso Lequio di Assaba	1	0	0	0	0	1	1	0	1
7	Piero D'Inzeo	0	1	1	0	1	3	0	2	4

== See also ==
- Italy at the Olympics
- Equestrian Summer Olympics medal table
- World Equestrian Games medal table
