= Equestrian Sports New Zealand Hall of Fame =

- Awarded for: New Zealand equestrian sport riders, horses, officials, volunteers and others who have achieved at the highest level
- First award: 14 March 2019
- Latest award: 26 June 2026
- Website: www.nzequestrian.org.nz/esnz-hall-of-fame-award-recipients/

The Equestrian Sports New Zealand Hall of Fame is a figurative hall of fame dedicated to New Zealand equestrian riders, horses, officials, volunteers and others from the wider equestrian world who have achieved at the highest level. The hall was established in 2019 by Equestrian Sports New Zealand, with the first inductions made at a ceremony in Hastings on 14 March 2019 during the Land Rover Horse of the Year Show at the Hawke's Bay Showgrounds.

== Laureates ==
The following is a complete list of laureates of the Equestrian Sports New Zealand Hall of Fame.

Year	Laureate	Notes
2019	Vaughn Jefferis	
2019	Andrew Nicholson	
2019	Blyth Tait	
2019	Mark Todd	
2020	Charisma	
2020	1964 Olympic showjumping team: Bruce Hansen (Tide); Graeme Hansen (Saba Sam); Adrian White (El Dorado); Charlie Matthews (Syndicate)	
2021	Marcia Bayley	
2021	Butch Thomas	
2021	1998 FEI Endurance World Championship team: Jenny Hearn (Simba); Kevin James (Glendora Sarita); Alan McCaughan (Tonka); John Stevenson (Taralea Raja)	
2023	John Cottle	
2023	Merran Hain	
2023	Alan Hampton	
2023	Peter Morris	
2023	Catriona Williams	
2024	Maurice Beatson	
2024	Colin Clarke and Town Boy	
2024	Kallista Field	
2024	Wallie Niederer	
2025	David Goodin	
2025	Penny Pearce	
2025	Harvey and Ann Wilson	
2025	Joe Yorke and Big Red	
2026	Sue Hobson	
