= Adrian White =

Adrian White may refer to:

- Adrian White (American football) (born 1964), former American football player
- Sir Adrian White (businessman) (born 1942), British businessman
- Adrian White (equestrian) (born 1933), New Zealand show jumper
- Adrian White (musician), Canadian drummer
- Adrian White (politician), Bahamian politician
- Adrian White (hurler), Irish hurler
