= Jorge Amaya =

Argentine equestrian (1934–2021)

Personal information
- Born: 31 July 1934 Buenos Aires, Argentina
- Died: 5 December 2021 (aged 87)

Sport
- Sport: Equestrian
Medal record
Equestrian
Representing Argentina
Pan American Games
Silver medal – second place	1963 São Paulo	Team jumping

Jorge Horacio Amaya Young (31 July 1934 – 5 December 2021) was an Argentine equestrian. She won a silver medal in the team event at the 1963 Pan American Games.

== Career ==
He competed in the individual jumping event at the 1968 Summer Olympics.

== Death ==
Amaya died on 5 December 2021, at the age of 87.
