= Antonio Oppes =

Italian equestrian

Personal information
- Nationality: Italian
- Born: August 26, 1916 Pozzomaggiore, Italy
- Died: 8 June 2002 (aged 85) Rome, Italy

Sport
- Country: Italy
- Sport: Equestrianism
- Event: Show jumping
Medal record
Olympic Games
Bronze medal – third place	1960 Rome	Team jumping

Antonio Oppes (26 August 1916 in Pozzomaggiore – 8 June 2002 in Rome) was an Italian show jumping rider who won a bronze medal at the Olympic Games.

== Biography ==
In his career he participated in one edition of the Summer Olympics, is the younger brother of Salvatore Oppes (1909–1987).

== Achievements ==
Year	Competition	Venue	Position	Event	Notes
1960	Olympic Games	(Italy) Rome	3rd	Team jumping	
