= Salvatore Oppes =

Italian equestrian (1909–1987)

Personal information
- Nationality: Italian
- Born: 2 November 1909 Pozzomaggiore, Italy
- Died: 27 February 1987 (aged 77) Rome, Italy

Sport
- Country: Italy
- Sport: Equestrianism
- Event: Show jumping
Medal record
Olympic Games
Silver medal – second place	1956 Stockholm	Team jumping

Salvatore Oppes (Pozzomaggiore, 2 November 1909 – 27 February 1987) was an Italian show jumping rider who won a silver medal at the Olympic Games.

== Biography ==
In his career he participated in two editions of the Summer Olympics, is the older brother of Antonio Oppes (1916–2002).

== Achievements ==
Year	Competition	Venue	Position	Event	Notes
1956	Olympic Games	(Sweden) Stockholm	2nd	Team jumping	
