= Walk of Fame of Italian sport =

Path in Rome, Italy

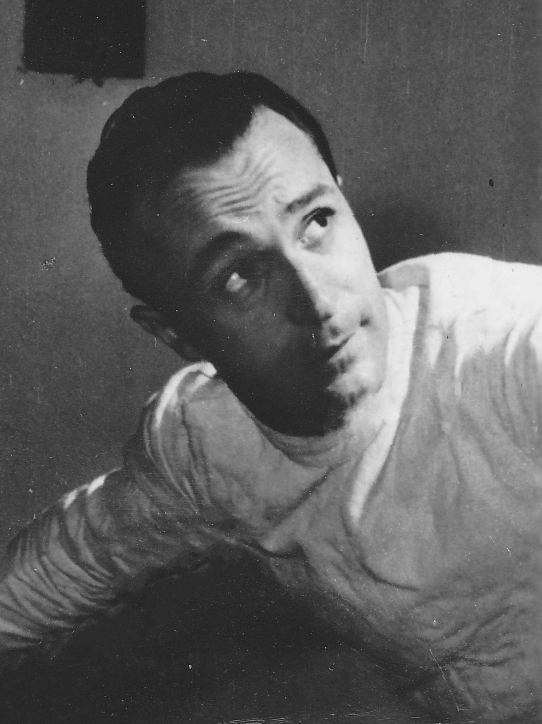
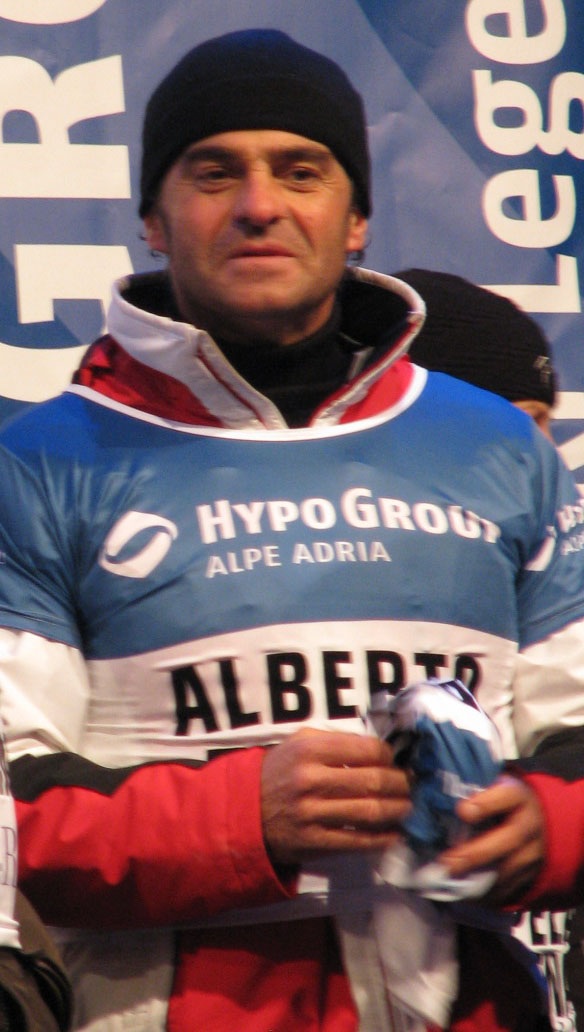
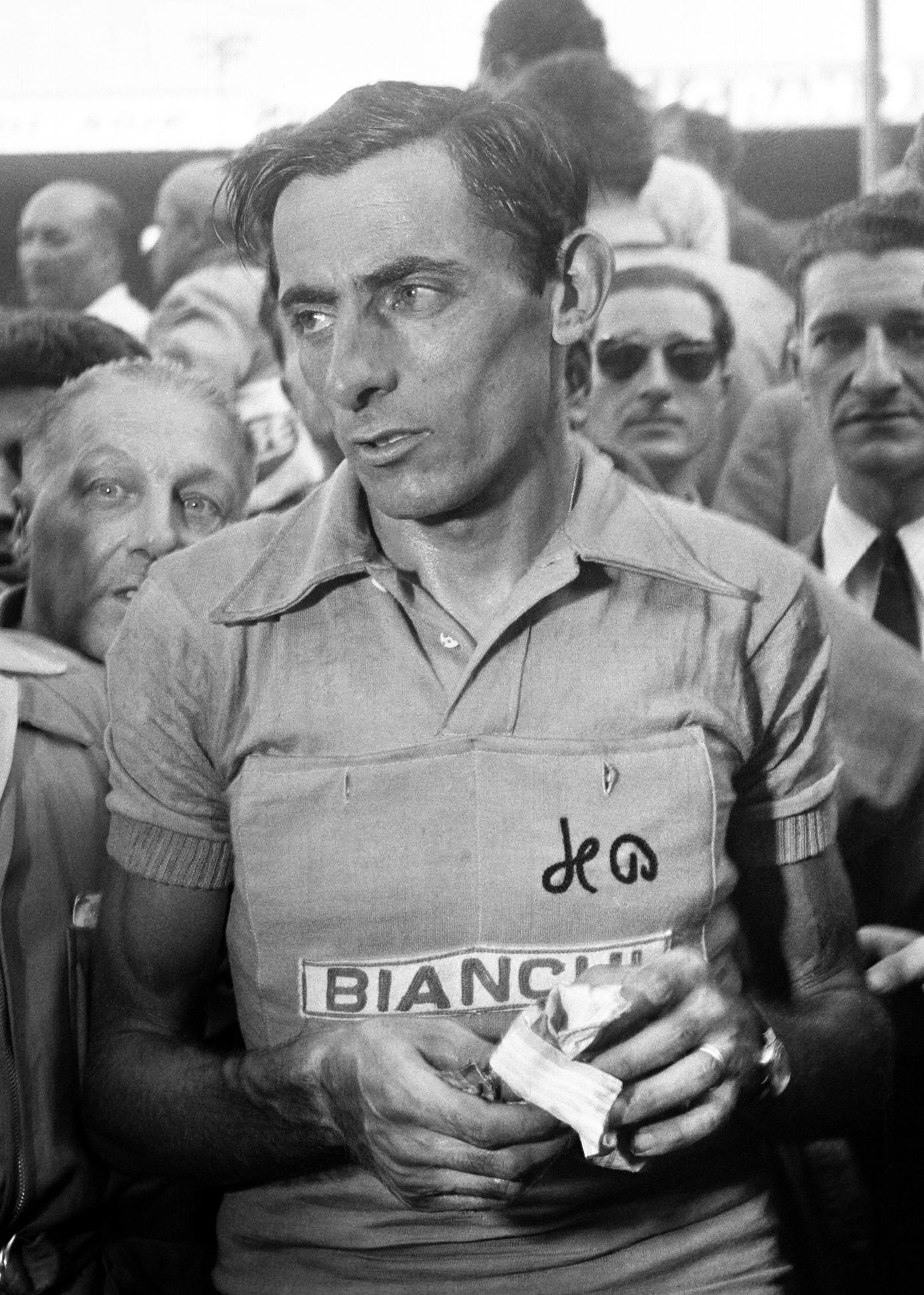
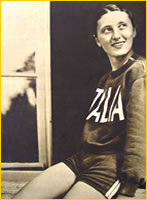
Four Italian legends (clockwise from the top left): Edoardo Mangiarotti (fencing, 6 gold medals at the Summer Olympics; Alberto Tomba (alpine skiing, 3 gold medals at the Winter Olympics and one World Cup won); Ondina Valla (athletics, first Italian female gold medal at the Olympic Games); Fausto Coppi (cycling, two Tour de France and five Giro d'Italia won).

Walk of Fame of Italian sport (Italian: Walk of Fame dello sport italiano) is the Walk of Fame of the Italian sport, inaugurated by Italian National Olympic Committee (CONI) on 7 May 2015. It is a list of 140 Italian all-time champions, which has been implemented on six occasions (five new entries in 2015, 2016 and 2021, seven in 2018, three in 2019, and fifteen in 2023), from the initial 100 names.

== Criteria ==
The first one hundred inductees consisted of former athletes chosen on the basis of the exclusive decisions of the CONI's Commissione Atleti (English: Athletes Commission), chaired by Marco Durante. During the first ceremony, it was announced that further former athletes would be added in subsequent years.

== The path ==
The Walk of Fame of Italian sport is a road path in Rome with plaques dedicated to former Italian sports athletes who have distinguished themselves internationally. It runs between the Avenue of the Olympics and the Stadio Olimpico in the Olympic Park of the Foro Italico of the capital.

== The list ==
First 100 names of the list were inducted on 7 May 2015.

Still alive.

#	Athlete	Sport	Birthplace	Birth (death) date
1	Gian Giorgio Trissino	Equestrian sports	Vicenza, Italy	22 July 1877 – 22 December 1963
2	Giovanni Raichevich	Wrestling	Trieste, Italy	10 June 1881 – 1 November 1957
3	Giorgio Zampori	Gymnastics	Milan, Italy	4 June 1887 – 7 December 1965
4	Paolo Salvi	Gymnastics	Albenga, Italy	22 November 1891 – 12 January 1945
5	Tazio Nuvolari	Auto racing	Castel d'Ario, Italy	16 November 1892 – 11 August 1953
6	Costante Girardengo	Cycling	Novi Ligure, Italy	18 March 1893 – 9 February 1978
7	Nedo Nadi	Fencing	Livorno, Italy	9 June 1894 – 29 January 1940
8	Ottavio Bottecchia	Cycling	San Martino, Italy	11 August 1894 – 15 June 1927
9	Carlo Galimberti	Weightlifting	Santa Fe, Argentina	2 August 1894 – 10 August 1939
10	Ugo Frigerio	Athletics	Milan, Italy	16 September 1901 – 7 July 1968
11	Alfredo Binda	Cycling	Cittiglio, Italy	11 August 1902 – 19 July 1986
12	Learco Guerra	Cycling	San Nicolò Po, Italy	14 October 1902 - 7 February 1963
13	Romeo Neri	Gymnastics	Rimini, Italy	26 March 1903 – 23 September 1961
14	Giulio Gaudini	Fencing	Rome, Italy	28 September 1904 – 6 January 1948
15	Primo Carnera	Boxing	Sequals, Italy	26 October 1906 – 29 June 1967
16	Giuseppe Meazza	Football	Milan, Italy	23 August 1910 – 21 August 1979
17	Silvio Piola	Football	Robbio, Italy	29 September 1913 – 4 October 1996
18	Gino Bartali	Cycling	Ponte a Ema, Italy	18 July 1914 – 5 May 2000
19	Agostino Straulino	Sailing	Mali Lošinj, Croatia	10 October 1914 – 14 December 2004
20	Ondina Valla	Athletics	Bologna, Italy	20 May 1916 – 16 October 2006
21	Adolfo Consolini	Athletics	Costermano sul Garda, Italy	5 January 1917 – 20 December 1969
22	Alberto Ascari	Auto racing	Milan, Italy	13 July 1918 – 26 May 1955
23	Valentino Mazzola	Football	Cassano d'Adda, Italy	26 January 1919 – 4 May 1949
24	Edoardo Mangiarotti	Fencing	Renate, Italy	7 April 1919 – 25 May 2012
25	Fausto Coppi	Cycling	Castellania Coppi, Italy	15 September 1919 – 2 January 1960
26	Zeno Colò	Alpine skiing	Abetone, Italy	June 30, 1920 – May 12, 1993
27	Fiorenzo Magni	Cycling	Vaiano, Italy	7 December 1920 – 19 October 2012
28	Giuseppe Delfino	Fencing	Turin, Italy	22 November 1921 – 10 August 1999
29	Piero D'Inzeo	Equestrian sports	Rome, Italy	4 March 1923 – 13 February 2014
30	Cesare Rubini (Note: Cesare Rubini was a legend of two different sports: basketball and water polo.)	Water polo & Basketball	Trieste, Italy	2 November 1923 – 8 February 2011
31	Raimondo D'Inzeo	Equestrian sports	Poggio Mirteto, Italy	8 February 1925 – 15 November 2013
32	Irene Camber	Fencing	Trieste, Italy	12 February 1926 – 23 February 2024
33	Pino Dordoni	Athletics	Piacenza, Italy	28 June 1926 – 24 October 1998
34	Eugenio Monti	Bob	Toblach, Italy	23 January 1928 – 1 December 2003
35	Enzo Maiorca	Freediving	Syracuse, Italy	21 June 1931 – 13 November 2016
36	Antonio Maspes	Cycling	Milan, Italy	14 January 1932 – 19 October 2000
37	Nicola Pietrangeli	Tennis	Tunis, Tunisia	11 September 1933 – 1 December 2025
38	Abdon Pamich	Athletics	Rijeka, Croatia	3 October 1933
39	Lea Pericoli	Tennis	Milan, Italy	22 March 1935 – 4 October 2024
40	Graziano Mancinelli	Equestrian sports	Milan, Italy	18 February 1937 – 8 October 1992
41	Eraldo Pizzo	Water polo	Rivarolo Ligure, Italy	21 April 1938
42	Nino Benvenuti	Boxing	Isola d'lstria, Italy	26 April 1938
43	Livio Berruti	Athletics	Turin, Italy	19 May 1939
44	Sante Gaiardoni	Cycling	Villafranca di Verona, Italy	29 June 1939 – 30 November 2023
45	Franco Nones	Cross-country skiing	Castello-Molina di Fiemme, Italy	1 February 1941
46	Marco Bollesan	Rugby	Chioggia, Italy	7 July 1941 – 11 April 2021
47	Franco Menichelli	Gymnastics	Rome, Italy	3 August 1941
48	Bruno Arcari	Boxing	Atina, Italy	1 January 1942
49	Dino Zoff	Football	Mariano del Friuli, Italy	28 February 1942
50	Giacomo Agostini	Motorcycle sport	Brescia, Italy	16 June 1942
51	Felice Gimondi	Cycling	Sedrina, Italy	29 September 1942 – 16 August 2019
52	Mauro Checcoli	Equestrian sports	Bologna, Italy	1 March 1943
53	Gianni Rivera	Football	Alessandria, Italy	18 August 1943
54	Roberto Marson	Paralympic sports	Pasiano di Pordenone, Italy	29 June 1944 – 7 November 2011
55	Gigi Riva	Football	Leggiuno, Italy	7 November 1944 – 22 January 2024
56	Luciano Giovannetti	Skeet shooting	Pistoia, Italy	25 September 1945
57	Renato Molinari	Powerboating	Nesso, Italy	27 February 1946 – 6 September 2024
58	Klaus Dibiasi	Diving	Hall in Tirol, Austria	6 October 1947
59	Dino Meneghin	Basketball	Alano di Piave, Italy	18 January 1950
60	Adriano Panatta	Tennis	Rome, Italy	9 July 1950
61	Gustavo Thoeni	Alpine skiing	Trafoi, Italy	28 February 1951
62	Oreste Perri	Canoeing	Castelverde, Italy	27 July 1951
63	Pietro Mennea	Athletics	Barletta, Italy	28 June 1952 – 21 March 2013
64	Pierluigi Marzorati	Basketball	Figino Serenza, Italy	12 September 1952
65	Corrado Barazzutti	Tennis	Udine, Italy	19 February 1953
66	Sara Simeoni	Athletics	Rivoli Veronese, Italy	19 April 1953
67	Piero Gros	Alpine skiing	Sauze d'Oulx, Italy	30 October 1954
68	Novella Calligaris	Swimming	Padua, Italy	27 December 1954
69	Daniele Masala	Modern pentathlon	Rome, Italy	12 February 1955
70	Costantino Rocca	Golf	Bergamo, Italy	4 December 1956
71	Gabriella Dorio	Athletics	Veggiano, Italy	27 June 1957
72	Peppiniello Di Capua	Rowing	Salerno, Italy	15 March 1958
73	Alberto Cova	Athletics	Cremnago, Italy	1 December 1958
74	Ezio Gamba	Judo	Brescia, Italy	2 December 1958
75	Patrizio Oliva	Boxing	Naples, Italy	28 January 1959
76	Gelindo Bordin	Athletics	Longare, Italy	4 February 1959
77	Giuseppe Abbagnale	Rowing	Pompei, Italy	24 July 1959
78	Paola Fantato	Paralympic sports	Verona, Italy	13 September 1959
79	Andrea Benelli	Skeet shooting	Florence, Italy	28 June 1960
80	Mauro Numa	Fencing	Mestre, Italy	18 November 1961
81	Carmine Abbagnale	Rowing	Pompei, Italy	5 January 1962
82	Manuela Di Centa	Cross-country skiing	Paluzza, Italy	3 January 1963
83	Francesco Attolico	Water polo	Bari, Italy	23 March 1963
84	Sandro Campagna	Water polo	Syracuse, Italy	26 June 1963
85	Luca Pancalli	Paralympic sports	Rome, Italy	16 April 1964
86	Josefa Idem	Canoeing	Goch, Germany	23 September 1964
87	Agostino Abbagnale	Rowing	Pompei, Italy	25 August 1966
88	Alberto Tomba	Alpine skiing	Bologna, Italy	19 December 1966
89	Roberto Baggio	Football	Caldogno, Italy	18 February 1967
90	Lorenzo Bernardi	Volleyball	Trento, Italy	11 August 1968
91	Antonio Rossi	Canoeing	Lecco, Italy	19 December 1968
92	Stefania Belmondo	Cross-country skiing	Vinadio, Italy	13 January 1969
93	Giorgio Lamberti	Swimming	Brescia, Italy	28 January 1969
94	Jury Chechi	Gymnastics	Prato, Italy	11 October 1969
95	Alessandra Sensini	Sailing	Grosseto, Italy	26 January 1970
96	Andrea Giani	Volleyball	Naples, Italy	22 April 1970
97	Giovanna Trillini	Fencing	Jesi, Italy	17 May 1970
98	Deborah Compagnoni	Alpine skiing	Bormio, Italy	4 June 1970
99	Stefano Baldini	Athletics	Castelnovo di Sotto, Italy	25 May 1971
100	Domenico Fioravanti	Swimming	Novara, Italy	31 May 1977
December 2015 inductees
101	Maurizio Damilano	Athletics	Scarnafigi, Italy	6 April 1957
102	Gianni De Magistris	Water polo	Florence, Italy	3 December 1950
103	Duilio Loi	Boxing	Trieste, Italy	19 April 1929 – 20 January 2008
104	Francesco Moser	Cycling	Palù di Giovo, Italy	19 June 1951
105	Enrico Fabris	Ice skating	Asiago, Italy	5 October 1981
106	Armin Zoeggeler	Luge	Merano, Italy	4 January 1974
107	Dorando Pietri	Athletics	Correggio, Italy	16 October 1885 – 7 February 1942
2016 inductees
108	Alberto Braglia	Gymnastics	Campogalliano, Italy	16 October 1885 – 7 February 1942
109	Sandro Mazzinghi	Boxing	Pontedera, Italy	3 October 1938 – 22 August 2020
110	Paola Pigni	Athletics	Milan, Italy	30 December 1945 – 11 June 2021
111	Mario Fiorillo	Water polo	Naples, Italy	16 December 1962
112	Valentina Vezzali	Fencing	Jesi, Italy	14 February 1974
2018 inductees
113	Luigi Beccali	Athletics	Milan, Italy	19 November 1907 – 29 August 1990
114	Ercole Baldini	Cycling	Villanova di Forlì, Italy	26 January 1933 – 1 December 2022
115	Paolo Maldini	Football	Milan, Italy	26 June 1968
116	Samuele Papi	Volleyball	Ancona, Italy	20 May 1973
117	Massimiliano Rosolino	Swimming	Naples, Italy	11 July 1978
2019 inductees
118	Sara Anzanello	Volleyball	San Donà di Piave, Italy	30 July 1980 - 25 October 2018
119	Antonella Bellutti	Cycling	Bolzano, Italy	7 November 1968
120	Roberto Cammarelle	Boxing	Cinisello Balsamo, Italy	22 March 1980
2021 inductees
121	Paolo Rossi	Football	Prato, Italy	23 September 1956 – 9 December 2020
122	Alessandro Andrei	Athletics	Florence, Italy	3 January 1959
123	Vincenzo Maenza	Wrestling	Imola, Italy	2 May 1962
124	Gabriella Paruzzi	Cross-country skiing	Udine, Italy	21 June 1969
125	Paolo Bettini	Cycling	Cecina, Italy	1 April 1974
2023 inductees
126	Flavia Pennetta	Tennis	Brindisi, Italy	25 February 1982
127	Tania Cagnotto	Diving	Bolzano, Italy	15 May 1985
128	Niccolò Campriani	Skeet shooting	Florence, Italy	6 November 1987
129	Fabio Cannavaro	Football	Naples, Italy	13 September 1973
130	Amedeo Pomilio	Water polo	Pescara, Italy	11 February 1967
131	Giulia Quintavalle	Judo	Livorno, Italy	6 March 1983
132	Carlo Molfetta	Taekwondo	Mesagne, Italy	15 February 1984
133	Marco Galiazzo	Archery	Padua, Italy	7 May 1983
134	Daniele Molmenti	Canoeing	Pordenone, Italy	1 August 1984
135	Antonio Tartaglia	Bob	Casalbordino, Italy	13 January 1968
136	Günther Huber	Bob	Bruneck, Italy	28 October 1965
137	Marco Albarello	Cross-country skiing	Aosta, Italy	31 May 1960
138	Maurilio De Zolt	Cross-country skiing	San Pietro di Cadore, Italy	29 September 1950
139	Silvio Fauner	Cross-country skiing	San Pietro di Cadore, Italy	1 November 1968
140	Giorgio Vanzetta	Cross-country skiing	Cavalese, Italy	9 October 1959

== Athletes by sport ==
Sport	Total
Athletics	17
Cycling	14
Football	10
Fencing	8
Cross-country skiing	8
Boxing	7
Water polo	7
Gymnastics	6
Alpine skiing	5
Equestrian sports	5
Tennis	5
Swimming	4
Rowing	4
Volleyball	4
Canoeing	4
Basketball	3
Auto racing	3
Paralympic sports	3
Skeet shooting	3
Bob	3
Sailing	2
Wrestling	2
Diving	2
Judo	2
Golf	1
Luge	1
Modern pentathlon	1
Motorcycle sport	1
Powerboating	1
Weightlifting	1
Rugby	1
Ice Skating	1
Freediving	1
Taekwondo	1
Archery	1
	141

== See also ==
- FIDAL Hall of Fame
- Italian Football Hall of Fame
