= John Cottle =

New Zealand equestrian

Personal information
- Full name: John Andrew Cottle
- Born: 11 August 1949 (age 75); Wellington, New Zealand

Sport
- Country: New Zealand
- Sport: Equestrian

John Andrew Cottle (born 11 August 1949) is a New Zealand former equestrian. He competed at the 1984 Summer Olympics and the 1988 Summer Olympics.

In 2023, Cottle was inducted into the Equestrian Sports New Zealand Hall of Fame.
