= Graeme Hansen =

New Zealand equestrian

Personal information
- Full name: Graeme Otto Hansen
- Born: 20 March 1934 Gisborne, New Zealand
- Died: 22 August 2007 (aged 73)

Sport
- Country: New Zealand
- Sport: Equestrian

Graeme Otto Hansen (20 March 1934 – 22 August 2007), also known as Hec Hansen, was a New Zealand equestrian.

== Career ==
Hansen was born in Gisborne in 1934 and grew up in Hexton near Gisborne. His parents were Ruie and Eva Hansen, and he had three siblings. His father was riding in the cavalry in WWI and all four children developed into skilled equestrians. Graeme started riding aged five; it was his transport to get to Mangapapa Primary School. He then attended Gisborne Intermediate and King's College in Auckland. His nickname "Hec" referred to the most prominent jockey of the time, Hector Gray.

Hansen started competing internationally in 1959. His uncle gave him a horse, Saba Sam, which his uncle considered not good enough for track racing, but it turned out to be an excellent show jumper. In 1964, Graeme Hansen and his elder brother Bruce Hansen made the first New Zealand equestrian team that was sent to the Tokyo Olympics. At the team jumping event captained by Bruce Hansen, they came in tenth place. In the individual jumping event he came twenty-third on Saba Sam. Graeme Hansen was New Zealand Olympian number 179. Both Hansen brothers retired from international competitions in 1968. Hansen was also competing in track racing and went horse hunting. He became an international horse jumping judge and was sought after to speak at judging seminars.

Hansen last went horse hunting three weeks before his death. He died, after a short illness, in late August 2007. He was survived by his wife and three children. In 2013, Hansen was posthumously inducted into the Tairawhiti Hall of Fame. In March 2020, the entire 1964 Olympic equestrian team of four riders and their horses (including Charlie Matthews, who as reserve did not get to compete) was inducted into the Equestrian Sports New Zealand Hall of Fame.
