= Equestrian events at the 1963 Pan American Games =

Equestrian events were included in the 1963 Pan American Games. The United States team won five gold medals.

== Events ==
Event	Gold	Silver	Bronze
Individual dressage	Patricia Galvin; United States	Francisco D'Alessandri; Argentina	Héctor Clavel; Chile
Show jumping	Mary Mairs; United States	Carlos Delia; Argentina	Américo Simonetti; Chile
Team Show jumping	United States of America; United States	Argentina; Argentina	Chile; Chile
Three-Day event	Michael Page; United States	Kevin Freeman; United States	Carlos Moratorio; Argentina
Team Three-Day event	United States of America; United States	None	None

== Medal table ==
Rank	Nation	Gold	Silver	Bronze	Total
1	United States	5	1	0	6
2	Argentina	0	3	1	4
3	Chile	0	0	3	3
Totals (3 entries)		5	4	4	13

== See also ==
- Equestrian events at the 1964 Summer Olympics
