= Gennady Samosedenko =

Russian equestrian (1942–2022)

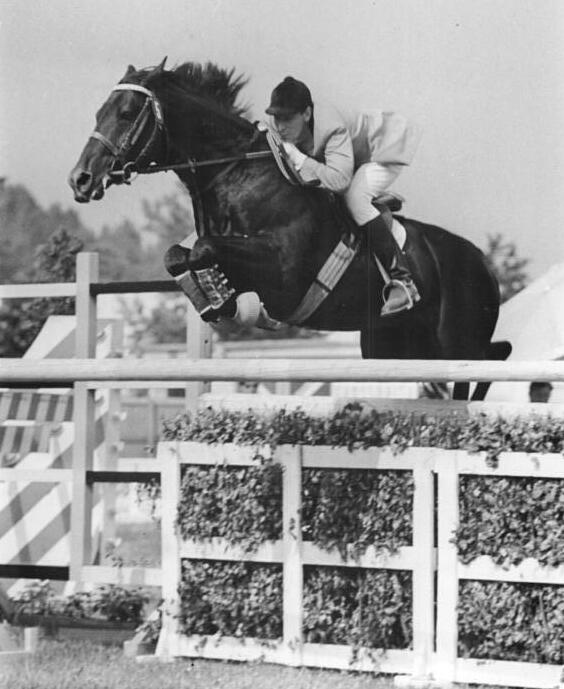
- Gennady Samosedenko in 1968

Personal information
- Nationality: Russian
- Born: 25 February 1942; Chelyabinsk, Russia
- Died: April 2022 (aged 80)

Sport
- Sport: Equestrian

Gennady Samosedenko (25 February 1942 – April 2022) was a Russian equestrian. He competed in the team jumping event at the 1968 Summer Olympics.
