= Catriona Williams =

New Zealand equestrian and charity founder

Dame Catriona Williams DNZM
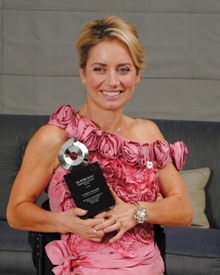
- Williams in 2010
- Born: Catriona Ruth McLeod; 1970 or 1971 (age 54–55)
- Known for: Founding the Catwalk Spinal Injury Trust
- Awards: Community Hero award, Member of the New Zealand Order of Merit, Dame Companion of the New Zealand Order of Merit, Equestrian Sports New Zealand Hall of Fame

Dame Catriona Ruth Williams DNZM (née McLeod; born 1970 or 1971) is a New Zealand equestrian and tetraplegic. Williams set up the Catwalk Spinal Injury Trust to raise funds for research into spinal injury.

== Equestrian achievements ==
Williams was born in 1970 or 1971, and grew up on a farm in Martinborough. She competed in eventing and showjumping in New Zealand and overseas. She was twice winner of the Pony Jumper of the Year, and twice winner of the Showjumping Rider with the Most Points at the Horse of the Year Show. She was placed 15th in the Open Europeans at Burghley and 15th at Saumur and Badminton the same year. She represented New Zealand in the World Cup Showjumping Final in Sweden in 1999, placing 38th.

== Catwalk Spinal Injury Trust ==
Williams suffered a spinal injury in a fall while riding in the horse trials at Kihikihi on 10 November 2002. The fall left her tetraplegic, with limited use of her hands and arms. After her injury, Williams set up the Catwalk Spinal Injury Trust to raise funds for research into spinal injury. The trust gave a large grant to found the Spinal Cord Research Facility at the University of Auckland, led by Louise Nicholson, Simon Carroll and Colin Green. The trust also funds project grants.

Williams undertakes sporting events to raise funds for spinal research and awareness of spinal injuries. She completed the New York marathon, cycled to Mount Everest base camp, and in 2024 cycled from Scotland to London. By 2019 she had raised $10 million for the Catwalk Trust.

== Honours and awards ==
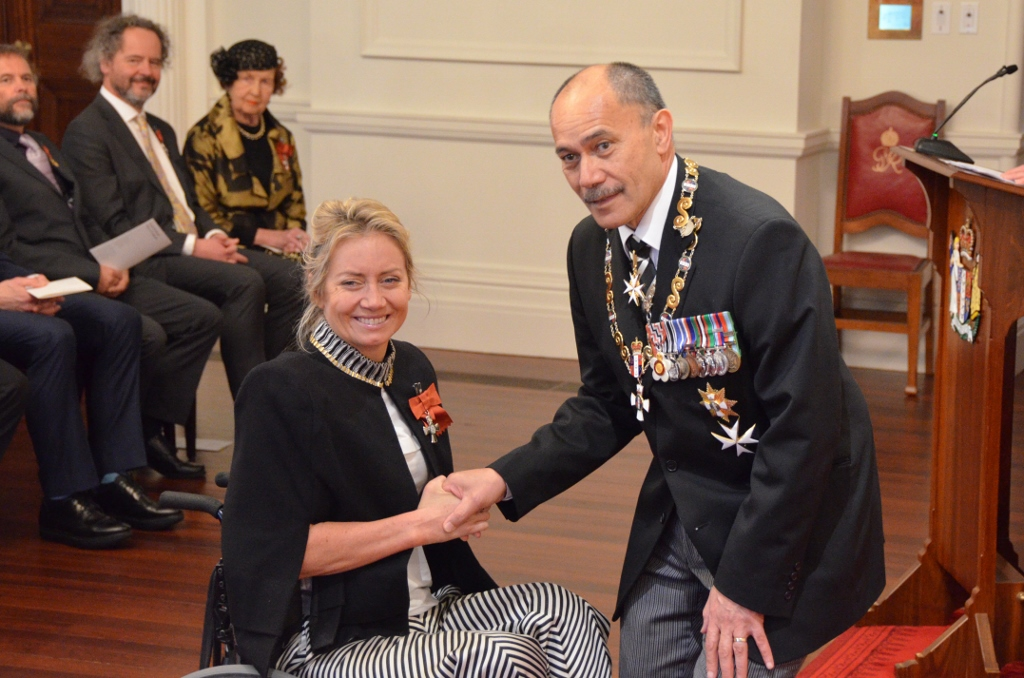
Williams (left), after her investiture as a Member of the New Zealand Order of Merit by the governor-general, Sir Jerry Mateparae, at Government House, Auckland, on 10 September 2014

In 2010 Williams was awarded a Sir Peter Blake Emerging Leader Award.

In the 2014 Queen's Birthday Honours Williams was appointed a Member of the New Zealand Order of Merit for services to spinal cord injury research.

In 2016 Williams was winner of the Community Hero section of the New Zealand Women of Influence Awards. She has twice been nominated for New Zealander of the Year Awards, in 2011 and again in 2014.

Williams was added to the NRM Horse of the Year Show Hall of Fame in 2014, and the Equestrian Sports New Zealand Hall of Fame in 2023.

In the 2025 King’s Birthday Honours, Williams was promoted to Dame Companion of the New Zealand Order of Merit, for services to spinal cord injury research and equestrian sport.
