= Kevin Bacon (equestrian) =

Australian equestrian (1932–2020)

Personal information
- Full name: Kevin Ashley Bacon
- Nationality: Australian
- Born: 20 March 1932 Dungog, New South Wales, Australia
- Died: 12 March 2020 (aged 87)

Sport
- Country: Australia
- Sport: Equestrianism
- Event: Show jumping

Kevin Ashley Bacon (20 March 1932 – 12 March 2020) was an Australian equestrian. He represented Australia at three Olympic Games.

At the 1964 Summer Olympics in Tokyo, Japan, he placed 30th in the individual show jumping event on his horse Ocean Foam. When he teamed up with John Fahey and Bridget MacIntyre he achieved his best result in his Olympic career when they finished seventh in the team show jumping event.

At the 1968 Olympics in Mexico City, Mexico, he placed 18th in the individual show jumping event on his horse Chichester. When he teamed up with John Fahey and Sam Campbell they placed ninth in the team show jumping event.

At the 1976 Olympics in Montreal, Quebec, Canada, he placed 37th in the individual show jumping event on his horse Chichester. When he teamed up with Guy Creighton and Barry Roycroft they placed equal ninth in the team show jumping event.

On 2 November 2000, Bacon was awarded the Australian Sports Medal for his equestrian achievements.

Bacon died on 12 March 2020 at the age of 87.
