= Fernando Hernández Vega =

Fernando Hernández Vega (1914–1988) was a Mexican military aviator. He was born in Guadalajara, Jalisco, Mexico, on 1 October 1914 and died in Mexico city on April 8, 1988.

== Education ==
He was educated in El Paso (Texas), where he started flight practice. He was second lieutenant interpreter when he entered the Military Aviation School in Mexico, where he graduated as second lieutenant aviator on July 15, 1941.

== Career ==
Vega was selected to join the 201 Squadron. He received combat training in the United States and participated in the Second World War in the reconquest of the Philippines. Upon returning to Mexico he was an instructor of P-47 aircraft and then was assistant military attache at the Mexican Embassy in Washington D. C., during which period he had the opportunity to fly P-51 Mustang and F-80 fighter planes. He became the first Mexican pilot to man a jet plane.

He graduated from the War College. He then commanded Fighting Squadron 200, was an English teacher at the Military School of Meteorology, organized the 5th Air Battalion and was commander of the Photographic Reconnaissance Squadron. In 1960 he received training in de Havilland Vampire jet and was later an instructor of these aircraft. For many years he made aerial photography flights for a specialized company and the Ministry of Public Works.

On November 20, 1972 he was promoted to Wing General.

He had a civilian pilot license in the category of Unlimited Public Transport (number 241) and accumulated nearly 20,000 flight hours. He translated several manuals from English into Spanish.

== Awards and recognition ==
Vega received several national and international awards, among which include:

Awards by the Congress of the Union

- The Ignacio Comonfort Distinction
- The War Cross
- Mexican Legion of Honor
- Multiple Perseverance decorations
- The Emilio Carranza Medal for having accumulated more than twenty thousand hours of flight.

Awards by the United States Congress

- The Air Medal
- Asiatic-Pacific Campaign Medal
- World War II Victory Medal
- American Defense Service Medal

Awards by the Republic of Yugoslavia

- Knight Grand Cross.
