= Shinzo Sasa =

Japanese equestrian

Personal information
- Nationality: Japanese
- Born: 15 December 1935 (age 90)

Sport
- Sport: Equestrian

Achievements and titles
- Olympic finals: 1964 Summer Olympics

Shinzo Sasa (born 15 December 1935) is a Japanese equestrian. He competed in two events at the 1964 Summer Olympics.
