= David Barker (equestrian) =

British equestrian

Personal information
- Full name: Charles David Barker
- Nationality: British
- Born: 22 September 1935; Yorkshire, England
- Died: 7 October 2018 (aged 83)

Sport
- Sport: Equestrian

Charles David Barker (22 September 1935 – 7 October 2018) was a British equestrian. He competed in the team jumping event at the 1960 Summer Olympics. His cousin is David B. Barker.
