= Pierre Jonquères d'Oriola =

French equestrian (1920–2011)

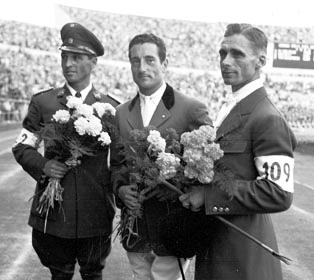
- d'Oriola (center) at the 1952 Olympics

Personal information
- Born: 1 February 1920 Corneilla-del-Vercol, France
- Died: 19 July 2011 (aged 91) Corneilla-del-Vercol, France
- Height: 173 cm (5 ft 8 in)
- Weight: 70 kg (154 lb)

Sport
- Sport: Horse riding
- Event: Show jumping
Medal record
Representing France
Olympic Games
Gold medal – first place	1952 Helsinki	Individual jumping
Gold medal – first place	1964 Tokyo	Individual jumping
Silver medal – second place	1964 Tokyo	Team jumping
Silver medal – second place	1968 Mexico City	Team jumping
World Championships
Gold medal – first place	1966 Buenos Aires	Individual jumping
Silver medal – second place	1954 Madrid	Individual jumping
Bronze medal – third place	1953 Paris	Individual jumping
European Championships
Silver medal – second place	1959 Paris	Individual jumping

Pierre Jonquères d'Oriola (1 February 1920 – 19 July 2011) was a French equestrian who competed in show jumping. He is the only person to win two individual Olympic gold medals in this discipline.

== Biography ==
D'Oriola's first gold medal was won at the 1952 Olympic Games in Helsinki, on the French gelding Ali Baba, and his second gold at the 1964 Olympic Games in Tokyo, riding the French gelding Lutteur B. Also in Tokyo, with Janous Lefevre and Guy Lefrant, again riding Lutteur B, he earned a team silver medal in jumping. In Mexico City, 1968, on Nagir, with teammates Lefevre and Jean Marcel Rozier, he acquired another silver in team jumping.

At the 1953 Show Jumping World Championships, in Paris, d'Oriola (on Ali Baba) took a bronze medal in the individual competition. In 1954, at Madrid, on Arlequin, he gained a silver in the individual competition. D'Oriola, riding Pomone B, was the gold medal World Champion in show jumping at Buenos Aires in 1966. He was also fourth at the 1953 and 1955 World Championships.

D'Oriola, with horse Virtuoso, was silver medalist at the European Show Jumping Championships in Paris, 1959.

D'Oriola's cousin, Christian, was also both an Olympic and world champion, but in fencing.
