= Torchy Millar =

Canadian equestrian

Personal information
- Full name: Terrance Millar
- Born: 20 August 1945 (age 81) Calgary, Alberta, Canada

Sport
- Sport: Equestrian
Medal record
Equestrian
Representing Canada
Pan American Games
Gold medal – first place	1971 Cali	Team jumping
Silver medal – second place	1983 Caracas	Team jumping

Torchy Millar (born 20 August 1945) is a Canadian equestrian. He competed at the 1968 Summer Olympics and the 1972 Summer Olympics.
