= An Deok-gi =

South Korean equestrian (born 1940)

Personal information
- Nationality: South Korean
- Born: 3 January 1940
- Died: 2 January 2024 (aged 83)

Sport
- Sport: Equestrian

An Deok-gi (An Duk-kee, Korean: 안덕기, 3 January 1940 – 2 January 2024) was a South Korean equestrian. He competed in two events at the 1964 Summer Olympics.
