= Kim Cheol-gyu =

South Korean equestrian

Personal information
- Nationality: South Korean
- Born: 20 August 1938 (age 86)

Sport
- Sport: Equestrian

Kim Cheol-gyu (Kim Chul-kyu, born 20 August 1938) is a South Korean equestrian. He competed in two events at the 1964 Summer Olympics.
