= Héctor Zatarain =

Mexican equestrian

Personal information
- Full name: Héctor Manuel Zataraín Romano
- Born: 27 June 1929; Mazatlan, Mexico

Sport
- Sport: Equestrian

Héctor Zatarain (born 27 June 1929) was a Mexican equestrian. He competed in two events at the 1964 Summer Olympics.
