= Monica Bachmann =

Swiss horse rider

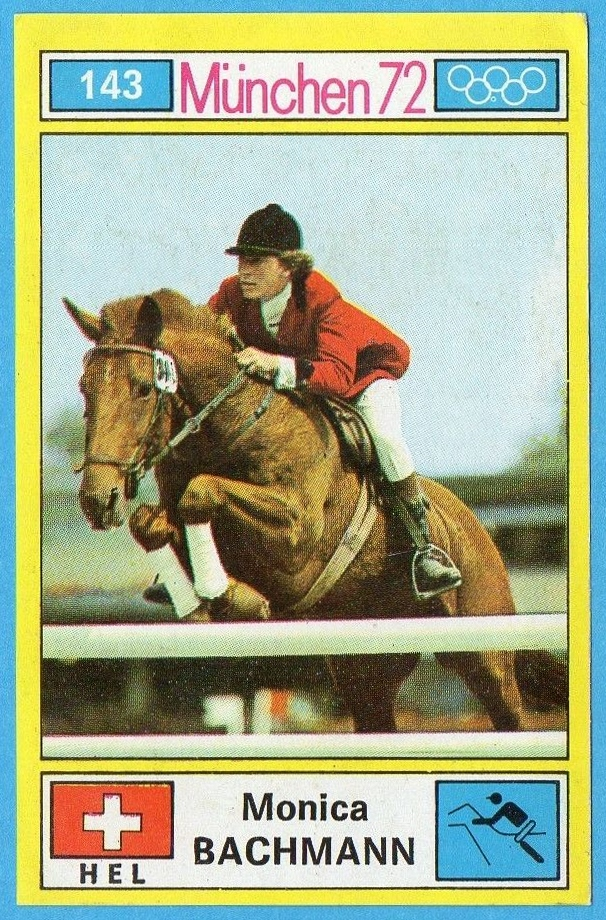

Personal information
- Born: 17 April 1942 (age 84) Sankt Gallen, Switzerland
- Height: 168 cm (5 ft 6 in)
- Weight: 57 kg (126 lb)

Sport
- Sport: Equestrianism
- Event: Show jumping
- Club: VEP, Elgg

Monica Bachmann-Weier (born 17 April 1942) is a retired Swiss horse rider. She competed in the individual and team show jumping at the 1968 and 1972 Summer Olympics and placed fifth-seventh. Her husband Paul Weier is also an Olympic show jumper.
