= David Barker (cricketer) =

English cricketer and field hockey player

Personal information
- Full name: Philip David Barker
- Born: 22 September 1951 (age 75); Edmonton, Middlesex, England
- Batting: Right-handed
- Bowling: Slow left-arm orthodox Left-arm medium

Domestic team information
- Years: Team
- 1974: Oxford University
- 1972–1987: Suffolk

Career statistics
Competition	First-class	List A
Matches	1	5
Runs scored	15	35
Batting average	7.50	7.00
100s/50s	–/–	–/–
Top score	14	14
Balls bowled	–	–
Wickets	–	–
Bowling average	–	–
5 wickets in innings	–	–
10 wickets in match	–	–
Best bowling	–	–
Catches/stumpings	–/–	1/–
- Source: Cricinfo, 6 July 2011

Philip David Barker (born 22 September 1951) is an English former cricketer and field hockey player. In cricket, Barker was a right-handed batsman who bowled both left-arm medium pace and slow left-arm orthodox. He was born in Edmonton, Middlesex.

Barker made his debut for Suffolk in the 1972 Minor Counties Championship against Buckinghamshire. In 1974, he made his only first-class appearance for Oxford University against Nottinghamshire. In this match, he scored 14 runs in the Oxford first-innings, before being dismissed by Bill Taylor. In their second-innings, he scored a single run before being dismissed by Barry Stead. He continued to play Minor counties cricket for Suffolk from 1972 to 1987, which included 63 Minor Counties Championship appearances and 6 MCCA Knockout Trophy matches. He made his List A debut against Derbyshire in the 1981 NatWest Trophy. He made 4 further List A appearances, the last of which came against Leicestershire in the 1988 NatWest Trophy. In his 5 List A matches, he scored 35 runs at an average of 7.00 with a high score of 14.

While studying at Oxford University, Barker played hockey for the university, for which he gained an Oxford Blue. He later played hockey for Suffolk, Eastern Counties and England (indoor international).
