= Lorenzo Amaya =

Argentine sports shooter (1896–1969)

Personal information
- Born: 5 September 1896 San Miguel de Tucumán, Argentina
- Died: 12 June 1969 (aged 72) Buenos Aires, Argentina

Sport
- Sport: Sports shooting

Lorenzo Amaya (5 September 1896 – 12 June 1969) was an Argentine sports shooter. He competed at the 1924 Summer Olympics and the 1936 Summer Olympics.
