= Lee Il-gyu =

South Korean equestrian

Personal information
- Nationality: South Korean
- Born: 16 September 1940 (age 84)

Sport
- Sport: Equestrian

Lee Il-gyu (Lee Il-kyu, born 16 September 1940) is a South Korean equestrian. He competed in two events at the 1964 Summer Olympics.
