= Fernando Hernández Leyva =

Mexican serial killer

- Born: 30 November 1964 (age 61); Cuernavaca, Morelos, Mexico
- Other name: "Pancho López"
- Penalty: 60 years imprisonment

Details
- Victims: 33–137
- Span of crimes: 1982–1999
- Country: Mexico
- States: Morelos, Jalisco, Colima, Guanajuato, Michoacán
- Date apprehended: 1999

Fernando Hernández Leyva (born 30 November 1964) is a Mexican serial killer. He was convicted in 1986 of 33 counts of murder committed in 5 different states of the Mexican union, but he confessed to killing around 100. Hernández Leyva's suspected number of actual murders amounts to 137, which would make him one of the most prolific serial killers in the history of Mexico. He was an organized killer, nomadic, hedonistic and motivated by interest.

== Biography ==
Not much is known about his childhood, so it is unclear what led to the development of his violent behavior. The actual number of victims estimated to have died at the hands of Hernández Leyva is 137, but as time passes and investigations continue, this number is increasing. For a period of 13 years, he was arrested twice and managed to escape both times from his cell. In 1999, he was arrested again, but this time he did not try to escape. Hernández Leyva tried to commit suicide by hanging himself in his prison cell unsuccessfully, failing to do so because of his weight. As a result, the rope broke and he suffered some minor injuries. Subsequently, a psychological examination concluded that Hernández Leyva had a psychopathic personality and had killed "to satisfy his personal needs".

== Apprehension ==
When the Mexican authorities reported that they had captured a person who claimed to have killed more than 100 people, many doubted the claims, since most of the crimes were unrecorded. Little by little, however, the truth began to emerge. Hernández Leyva was captured for the first time in 1982 but then escaped custody, and was recaptured in 1999.

Leyva, nicknamed "Pancho López", appeared before the television cameras and confessed to killing more than 100 people and kidnapping 6. The crimes were committed in 4 different states and when asked why he did it, he replied: "I killed them all because I had to. I didn't know what else to do!".

== Trial and conviction ==
Shortly after, the trial of Hernández Leyva began. He was accused, along with three accomplices, of several counts of robbery and kidnapping, in addition to the 137 murders that ended up being attributed to him. The crimes, according to authorities, were committed over several years in the states of Morelos, Jalisco, Colima, Guanajuato and Michoacán. Shortly thereafter, however, the accused retracted his statements, and although he admitted to abducting a journalist and killing a police officer, he said that the bailiffs had beaten him into confessing, and that he was threatened that his wife would be raped if he did not plead guilty to the crimes. The authorities, however, did not comment on Hernández Leyva's statements.

When Hernández Leyva was transferred to a penitentiary in the state of Morelos, there were public protests by people who wanted to take justice in their own hands. The criminal was put in maximum surveillance, since he had a record for escaping twice from prison before. The prosecutor, José Leonardo Castillo Pombo, said that a few days after the investigations began, the counts of death attributed to Leyva began to grow alarmingly.

In April 1999, Hernández Leyva attempted to commit suicide in his cell. However, his weight caused the improvised rope to break (he weighed more than 150 kilos) and suffered nothing but abrasions on his neck.

Little is known about the case of Fernando Hernández Leyva. He is currently in the "La Palma" prison and, if he completes his sentence, will be released in 2049, at 84 years of age.

== See also ==
- List of serial killers by country
- List of serial killers by number of victims
