= Joaquín Hermida =

Mexican equestrian (born 1921)

Joaquín Hermida Torres
Personal information
- Born: 16 August 1921; Alvarado, Mexico

Sport
- Sport: Equestrian

Joaquín Hermida (born 16 August 1921) was a Mexican equestrian. He competed in two events at the 1964 Summer Olympics.
