= Hermann Schridde =

German equestrian

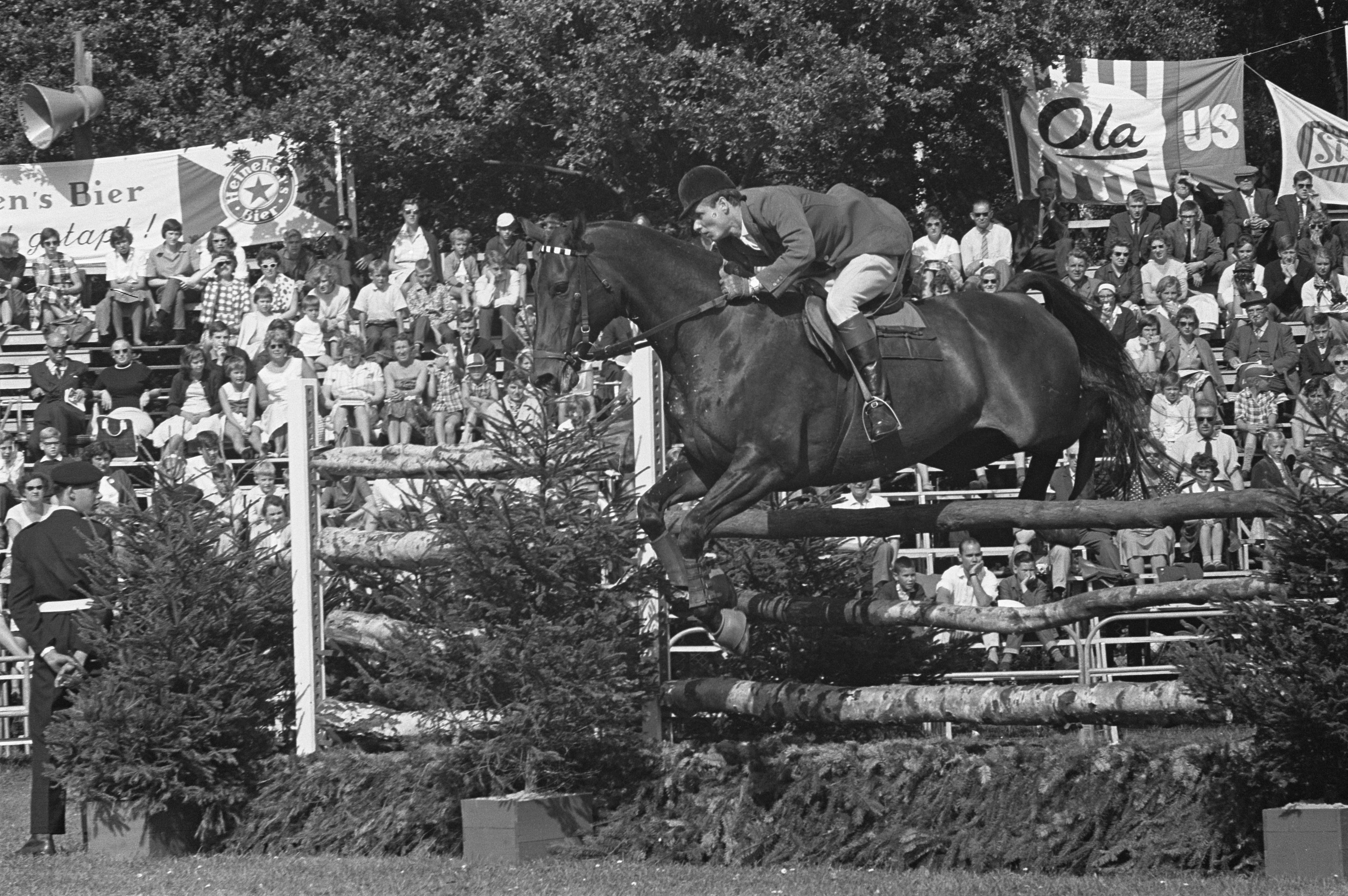
- Schridde on Ilona at the CHIO Rotterdam

Personal information
- Born: 3 July 1937 Celle, Germany
- Died: 18 May 1985 (aged 47) Meißendorf, near Winsen, West Germany

Sport
- Sport: Equestrian
- Event: Show jumping
Medal record
Representing Germany
Equestrian
Gold medal – first place	1964 Tokyo	Team jumping
Silver medal – second place	1964 Tokyo	Individual jumping
Representing West Germany
Equestrian
Bronze medal – third place	1968 Mexico City	Team jumping

Hermann Schridde (3 July 1937 – 18 May 1985) was a German equestrian. Schridde won the German show jumping championship in 1960.

Schridde was a show jumper at the 1964 Summer Olympics for the United Team of Germany. He won a gold medal in the team event and a silver medal in the individual event. In 1965, he won the European Show Jumping Championships in Aachen riding Dozent. At the 1968 Summer Olympics, he won a bronze medal in the team event, riding for West Germany. He qualified for West Germany for the 1972 Summer Olympics, but withdrew, and founded a private school for parachutists in Meißendorf.

He was appointed German federal show jumping trainer in 1980, and held the post until his death from an aircraft crash in 1985.
