= Aleksandr Purtov =

Soviet equestrian (1935–2009)

Personal information
- Nationality: Soviet
- Born: 27 October 1935
- Died: 5 November 2009 (aged 74)

Sport
- Sport: Equestrian

Aleksandr Purtov (27 October 1935 – 5 November 2009) was a Soviet equestrian. He competed in two events at the 1964 Summer Olympics.
