= Bruce Hansen (equestrian) =

New Zealand equestrian

Personal information
- Full name: Richard Bruce Hansen
- Born: 14 February 1928; Gisborne, New Zealand
- Died: 12 May 2002 (aged 74)

Sport
- Country: New Zealand
- Sport: Equestrian

Richard Bruce Hansen (14 February 1928 – 12 May 2002) was a New Zealand equestrian. He competed in two events at the 1964 Summer Olympics together with his brother Graeme Hansen. In March 2020, the entire 1964 Olympic equestrian team of four riders and their horses (including Charlie Matthews, who as reserve did not get to compete) was inducted into the Equestrian Sports New Zealand Hall of Fame.
