= Manuel de Amaya =

Spanish merchant and politician

Administrador General of The Real Renta de Tabaco
- In office 1778 – c. 1790
- Monarch: Charles III

Personal details
- Born: c. 1740 Sevilla, Spain
- Died: c. 1800 Buenos Aires, Argentina
- Occupation: Government
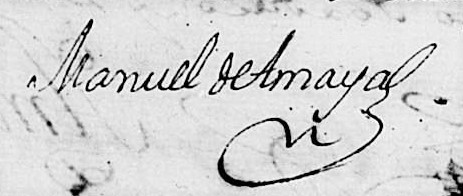
- Signature

Manuel de Amaya (c. 1740 – c. 1800) was a Spanish merchant and politician, who served during the Viceroyalty of Río de la Plata as administrator general of the Real Renta de Tabaco of Buenos Aires.

== Biography ==
Amaya was born in Sevilla in Spain, son of Juan José de Amaya and Agustina Andrés Pollos, belonging to a noble Spanish family. He arrived in the port of Buenos Aires to fulfill governmental functions in the city towards the year 1775. And he was the first holder in the Administración General of Tabaco of the Río de la Plata, to which he was appointed in 1778.

He was married to Valentina Zenzano, born in the city, daughter of Don Joseph Zenzano, a royal notary, born in Álava and Doña Agripina de Mansilla, born in Cádiz.
