= Ivan Semyonov (equestrian) =

Soviet equestrian

Personal information
- Nationality: Soviet
- Born: 25 January 1936 (age 89)

Sport
- Sport: Equestrian

Ivan Semyonov (born 25 January 1936) is a Soviet equestrian. He competed in two events at the 1964 Summer Olympics.
