= FEI Endurance World Championship =

The FEI Endurance World Championship are an international event in equestrian organized by the International Federation for Equestrian Sports (French: Fédération Équestre Internationale, FEI).

== Endurance World Championship ==
Year	Venue	Individual	Team
2008	Terengganu (MAS)		
2022	Butheeb United Arab Emirates,	Mr Abdulrahman Mohammed Alzayed; Bahrain	Virginie ATGER; Vincent GAUDRIOT; Clementine CHAUD; Philippe TOMAS; Justin MOUROU; France
2024	Monpazier (FRA)		
