= Américo Simonetti =

Chilean equestrian

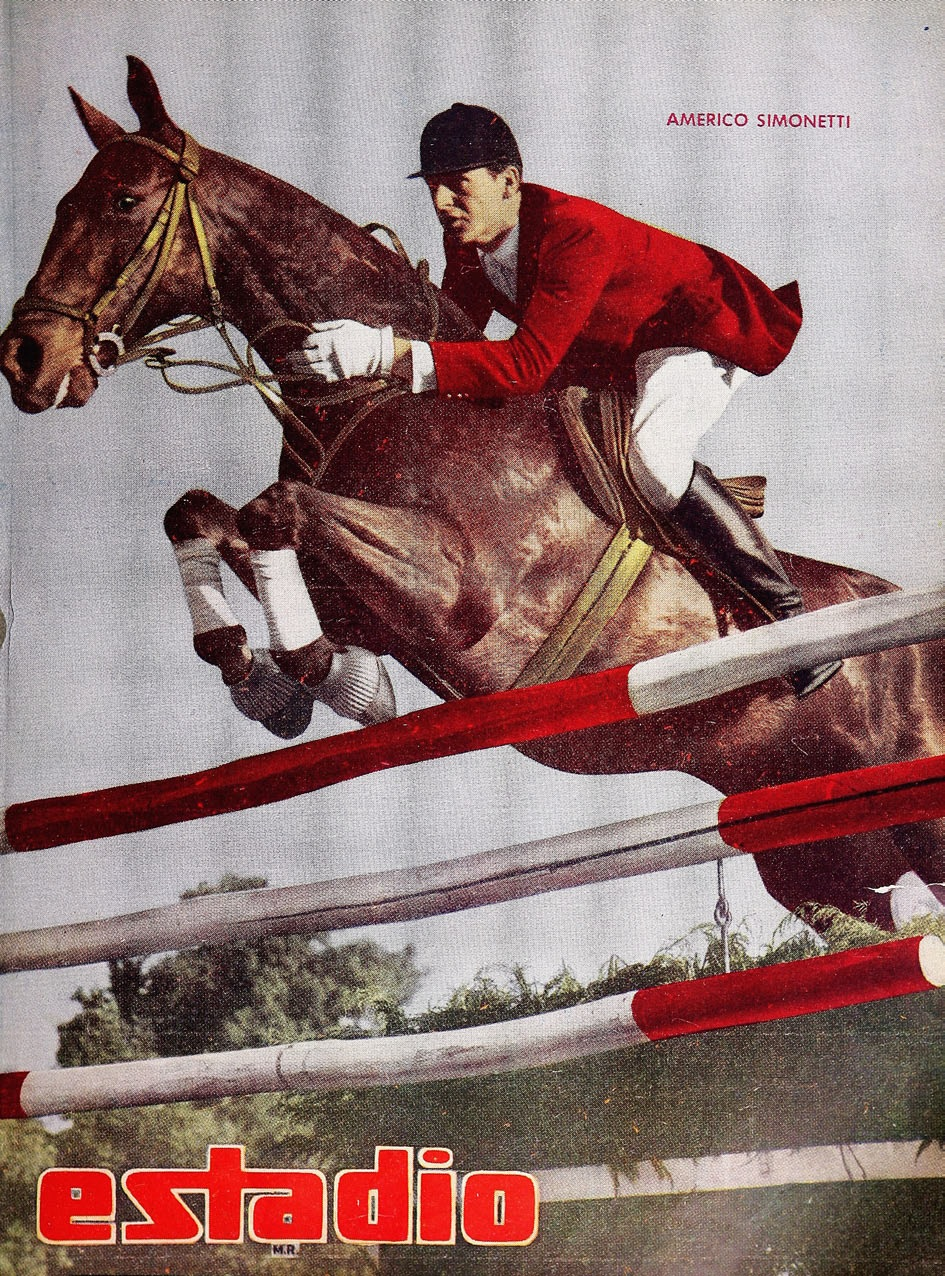
- Américo Simonetti in 1959

Personal information
- Nationality: Chilean
- Born: 16 September 1936 (age 89)

Sport
- Sport: Equestrian
Medal record
Equestrian
Representing Chile
Pan American Games
Bronze medal – third place	1959 Chicago	Team jumping
Bronze medal – third place	1963 São Paulo	Individual jumping
Bronze medal – third place	1963 São Paulo	Team jumping

Américo Simonetti (born 16 September 1936) is a Chilean equestrian. He competed at the 1964 Summer Olympics, the 1972 Summer Olympics, and the 1984 Summer Olympics.
