= Viktor Matveyev =

Russian equestrian

Personal information
- Nationality: Russian
- Born: 21 May 1942 (age 82); Yekaterinburg, Russia

Sport
- Sport: Equestrian

Viktor Matveyev (born 21 May 1942) is a Russian equestrian. He competed at the 1968 Summer Olympics and the 1972 Summer Olympics.
