= David B. Barker =

British equestrian (1943–2022)

Personal information
- Full name: David Boston Barker
- Nationality: British
- Born: 12 April 1943; Northallerton, Yorkshire, England
- Died: 3 June 2022 (aged 79)

Sport
- Sport: Equestrian

David Boston Barker (12 April 1943 – 3 June 2022) was a British equestrian. He competed in two events at the 1964 Summer Olympics. His cousin is C. David Barker. Barker died on 3 June 2022, at the age of 79.
