= Arthur Blickenstorfer =

Swiss equestrian

Personal information
- Nationality: Swiss
- Born: 20 April 1935; Obfelden, Switzerland
- Died: 27 October 2001 (aged 66)

Sport
- Sport: Equestrian

Arthur Blickenstorfer (20 April 1935 – 27 October 2001) was a Swiss equestrian. He competed in two events at the 1968 Summer Olympics.
