= Peter Robeson =

British equestrian (1929–2018)

Medal record

Equestrian

Representing United Kingdom

Olympic Games
Bronze medal – third place	1956 Stockholm	Team jumping
Bronze medal – third place	1964 Tokyo	Show jumping

Peter Robeson OBE (21 October 1929 – 29 September 2018) was a British equestrian and Olympic medalist. He won a bronze medal in show jumping (team) at the 1956 Summer Olympics in Melbourne, Victoria, Australia, and a bronze medal in individual show jumping at the 1964 Summer Olympics in Tokyo. Among his talented stable of horses were Craven A, Firecrest, and Grebe.

Peter was married to Rene Robeson, heiress to the Rothschild dynasty, and the continued his involvement with horses training National Hunt racehorses with Rene Robeson as the License holder. They had a very successful, but small yard of homebred, and exclusive club of owners' horses. Peter Robeson, affectionately known as "The boss", was actively involved in running the yard up until his final days. Known for a super dry sense of humour and no nonsense style.

Stuart Edmunds, long time "apprentice" to the boss in his showjumping days took over running of the racing yard after Peter's wife, Rene Robeson, died.

Peter Robeson died on 29 September 2018.
