= Joseph Zenzano =

Spanish nobleman

Josesph Zenzano

Escribano Mayor de Gobierno of Buenos Aires
- In office 1784–1790
- Monarch: Charles III of Spain

Personal details
- Born: c. 1710 Alava, Spain
- Died: April 28, 1790 (aged 79–80) Buenos Aires, Argentina
- Spouse: Agripina de Mansilla Ruiz
- Occupation: Government
- Profession: Notary
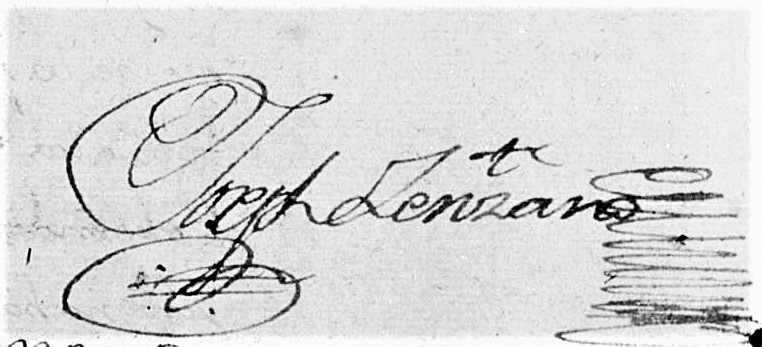
- Signature

Joseph Zenzano (c. 1710 – 1790) was a Spanish nobleman, who served as Escribano Mayor de Gobierno of Buenos Aires, in the viceroyalty of Juan José de Vértiz y Salcedo.

== Biography ==
Zenzano was born in Alava (Spain), son of José Zenzano and Gracia Ozagre. He was married to Agripina de Mansilla, born in Cádiz, daughter of Pedro Nolasco de Mansilla and Elvira Martín Ruiz. His wife was a descendant of Gonzalo Fernández de Mansilla, a nobleman, who was born in 1432 in Mansilla. Agripina was aunt of the last Regidor Perpetuo of Buenos Aires, don Manuel Mansilla.

In 1739, Joseph Zenzano, served as Minister of the Casa de la Contratación, being commissioned to ascertain the alleged excesses occurred at the entrance of the ships to port of Buenos Aires. He served during the Viceroyalty of Río de la Plata as Royal Notary, public and of government of Buenos Aires.
