= Kurt Jarasinski =

German equestrian

Medal record

Equestrian

Representing Germany

Olympic Games
Gold medal – first place	1964 Tokyo	Show jumping, Team

Kurt Jarasinski (6 November 1938 in Elpersbüttel – 27 October 2005 in Langerwehe) was a German equestrian and Olympic champion. He won a gold medal in show jumping with the German team at the 1964 Summer Olympics in Tokyo.
