= Sam Campbell (equestrian) =

Australian equestrian

Personal information
- Full name: Samuel Campbell
- Nationality: Australian
- Born: 29 September 1944 (age 80); Walcha, New South Wales, Australia

Sport
- Sport: Equestrian
- Event: Show jumping

Samuel Campbell (born 29 September 1944) is an Australian former equestrian. He competed in two events at the 1968 Summer Olympics.
