= Yevgeny Kuzin =

Russian equestrian

Personal information
- Nationality: Russian
- Born: 9 July 1948 (age 76); Moscow, Russia

Sport
- Sport: Equestrian

Yevgeny Kuzin (born 9 July 1948) is a Russian equestrian. He competed in two events at the 1968 Summer Olympics.
