= Tadashi Fukushima (equestrian) =

Japanese equestrian

Tadashi Fukushima (Japanese: 福島 正; born 1 January 1944) is a Japanese equestrian. He competed at the 1968 Summer Olympics and the 1972 Summer Olympics.
