= Paco Goyoaga =

Spanish equestrian

Personal information
- Nationality: Spanish
- Born: 16 May 1920; Madrid, Spain
- Died: 25 May 1980 (aged 60); Madrid, Spain

Sport
- Sport: Equestrian

Paco Goyoaga (16 May 1920 – 25 May 1980) was a Spanish equestrian. He competed at the 1956 Summer Olympics, the 1960 Summer Olympics and the 1964 Summer Olympics.
