= Piotr Wawryniuk =

Polish equestrian

Personal information
- Nationality: Polish
- Born: 29 June 1943 (age 83) Stary Pawłów, Poland

Sport
- Sport: Equestrian

Piotr Wawryniuk (born 29 June 1943) is a Polish equestrian. He competed at the 1968 Summer Olympics and the 1972 Summer Olympics, as well as competitions in Poland.

Piotr is the son of Stanisław & Maria (née Bujan), and his siblings are the sisters Jadwiga and Teresa, and brother Janusz. He is married to Felicja (née Łukomska).
