= Yugo Araki =

Japanese equestrian

Personal information
- Nationality: Japanese
- Born: 20 March 1925; Kyoto, Japan
- Died: 2 September 2012 (aged 87); Kyoto, Japan

Sport
- Sport: Equestrian

Yugo Araki (荒木 雄豪; 20 March 1925 – 2 September 2012) was a Japanese equestrian. He competed at the 1960 Summer Olympics and the 1968 Summer Olympics.
