= Hugo Miguel Arrambide =

Argentine equestrian

Hugo Miguel Arrambide (September 25, 1927 – April 25, 1985) was one of Argentina's top show jumping riders. His best horses were Chimbote, Camalote, Ministerio and Mio-Mio. He won Argentina's National Championship in 1965, 1966, 1972 and 1973, as well as 38 international tournaments, among them the prestigious CHIO Aachen in 1965, with Chimbote.

Arrambide represented Argentina at the 1964, 1968 and 1972 Summer Olympics. He received the 1980 Konex Merit Diploma for horsemanship.

Arrambide and Camalote being awarded a prize at a tournament in Buenos Aires, early 1970s
