= Antoni Pacyński =

Polish equestrian

Personal information
- Full name: Antoni Kazimierz Pacyński
- Nationality: Polish
- Born: 29 May 1943 (age 82) Jarosław, Poland

Sport
- Sport: Equestrian

Antoni Kazimierz Pacyński (born 29 May 1943) is a Polish equestrian. He competed in two events at the 1968 Summer Olympics.
