= Masayasu Sugitani =

Japanese equestrian

Personal information
- Nationality: Japanese
- Born: 18 May 1943 (age 81); Osaka, Japan

Sport
- Sport: Equestrian

Masayasu Sugitani (Japanese: 杉谷 昌保; born 18 May 1943) is a Japanese equestrian. He competed at the 1968 Summer Olympics, the 1972 Summer Olympics and the 1976 Summer Olympics.
