= Hans Möhr (equestrian) =

Swiss equestrian

Hans Möhr (23 June 1916 – 28 August 2014) was a Swiss equestrian who competed in the 1960 Summer Olympics and in the 1964 Summer Olympics. He died in August 2014 at the age of 98.
