= Lúcia Faria =

Brazilian equestrian (1945–2024)

Personal information
- Full name: Lúcia Faria Alegria Simões
- Born: 11 November 1945 Rio de Janeiro, Brazil
- Died: 29 January 2024 (aged 78)

Sport
- Sport: Equestrian

Achievements and titles
- Olympic finals: 1968 Summer Olympics

Lúcia Faria Alegria Simões (11 November 1945 – 29 January 2024) was a Brazilian equestrian. She competed in two events at the 1968 Summer Olympics.

Faria died on 29 January 2024, at the age of 78.
