= Fernando Hernández (equestrian) =

Mexican equestrian (1924–1995)

Personal information
- Born: 20 July 1924 Toluca, Mexico
- Died: 27 February 1995 (aged 70) Miguel Hidalgo, Mexico City, Mexico

Sport
- Sport: Equestrian
Medal record
Equestrian
Representing Mexico
Pan American Games
Silver medal – second place	1975 Mexico City	Team jumping

Fernando Hernández Izquierdo (20 July 1924 – 27 February 1995) was a Mexican equestrian. He competed at the 1968 Summer Olympics, the 1972 Summer Olympics and the 1976 Summer Olympics.
