= Adrian White (equestrian) =

New Zealand equestrian

Personal information
- Full name: Adrian Patrick Kinross White
- Born: 21 April 1933 (age 91); Napier, New Zealand

Sport
- Country: New Zealand
- Sport: Equestrian

Adrian Patrick Kinross White (born 21 April 1933) is a New Zealand equestrian. He competed at the 1960 Summer Olympics and the 1964 Summer Olympics. In March 2020, the entire 1964 Olympic equestrian team of four riders and their horses (including Charlie Matthews, who as reserve did not get to compete) was inducted into the Equestrian Sports New Zealand Hall of Fame.
