= Mary Mairs-Chapot =

American equestrian (born 1944)

Mary Mairs Chapot
Personal information
- Nationality: American
- Born: June 20, 1944 (age 82) Pasadena, California, United States

Sport
- Sport: Equestrian
Medal record
Equestrian
Representing the United States
Pan American Games
Gold medal – first place	1963 São Paulo	Individual jumping
Gold medal – first place	1963 São Paulo	Team jumping
Silver medal – second place	1967 Winnipeg	Team jumping

Mary Mairs Chapot (born June 20, 1944) is an American equestrian. She competed at the 1964 Summer Olympics and the 1968 Summer Olympics.
