= Carlos César Delía =

Argentine general

- Then Major Delía shaking hands with rival Raimondo D'Inzeo of Italy, ca. 1960
- Born: January 21, 1923; Concordia, Entre Ríos, Argentina
- Died: October 6, 2014 (aged 91); Buenos Aires, Argentina
- Sports career
Medal record
Equestrian
Representing Argentina
Pan American Games
| Silver medal – second place | 1951 Buenos Aires | Individual jumping |
| Silver medal – second place | 1951 Buenos Aires | Team jumping |
| Silver medal – second place | 1963 São Paulo | Individual jumping |
| Silver medal – second place | 1963 São Paulo | Team jumping |
- Military career
- Allegiance: Argentina
- Branch: Argentine Army
- Rank: Brigade General (pre-1991 epaulette)
- Commands: III Army Corps
- Conflicts: Dirty War

Carlos César Idelfonso Delía Larocca (January 21, 1923 – October 6, 2014) was an Argentine equestrian, a diplomat and a brigade general in the Argentine Army.

== Sporting career ==
He represented his country in several Olympic Games and World Championships, achieving individual fourth place at the 1956 World Championship in Aachen, Germany and second place at the 1960 World Championship in Venice, Italy.

Carlos was the flag bearer for Argentina at the opening ceremony of the 1972 Summer Olympics in Munich, West Germany.

He served as president of the Argentine Equestrian Federation from 1983 to 1993 and as president of the Argentine Military Sporting Federation from 1980 to 1983.

Some of his best remembered horses were Huipil, Maravedí and Cardón.

== Military career ==
From January 1974 to January 1975, Delía was the Military Attache to the United States, Embassy of Argentina. On May 6, 1975, the U.S. Department of the Army considered presenting Delía with the Legion of Merit, Degree of Officer. Upon his return to Argentina, his last appointment in the Argentine Army was as commander of the III Army Corps, which at the time was engaged in battle against the People's Revolutionary Army in the province of Tucumán. In August 1975, after an institutional crisis due to the designation of active colonel Vicente Damasco as Minister of the Interior, Delía, as the second highest ranking general, rebelled against the commander of the Army, lt. general Numa Laplane. The crisis ended with the appointment of brigade general Jorge Rafael Videla as commander of the Army, the replacement of Damasco with civilian Ángel Federico Robledo and the retirement of both Numa Laplane and Delía.

== Diplomatic career ==
In July 1976, Delía was designated as Ambassador of Argentina to Belgium, post he held until January, 1980.
