= Max Hauri =

Swiss equestrian

Personal information
- Nationality: Swiss
- Born: 30 December 1941
- Died: 6 December 2015 (aged 73); Seon, Switzerland

Sport
- Sport: Equestrian

Max Hauri (30 December 1941 – 6 December 2015) was a Swiss equestrian. He competed at the 1964 Summer Olympics and the 1972 Summer Olympics.
