= Janou Lefèbvre =

French equestrian (1945–2025)

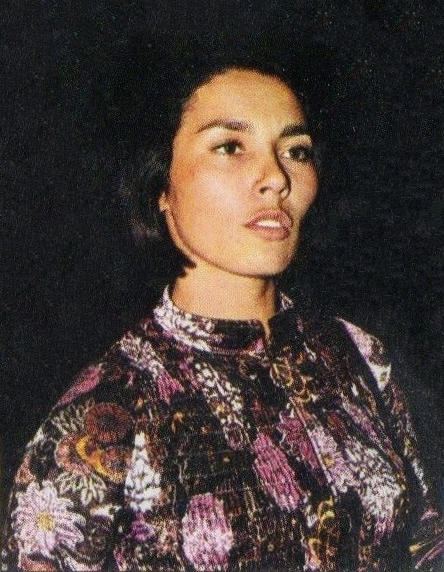

Personal information
- Full name: Jane Alice Germaine Lefèbvre
- Born: 14 May 1945 Saigon, French Indochina
- Died: 10 April 2025 (aged 79) Aix-en-Provence, France
- Height: 167 cm (5 ft 6 in)
- Weight: 60 kg (132 lb)

Sport
- Sport: Equestrianism
- Event: Show jumping
Medal record
Representing France
Olympic Games
Silver medal – second place	1964 Tokyo	Team jumping
Silver medal – second place	1968 Mexico City	Team jumping
Show Jumping World Championships
Gold medal – first place	1970 Copenhagen	Individual
Gold medal – first place	1974 La Baule	Individual

Jane "Janou" Lefèbvre (pronounced [ləfɛvʁ], later Tissot [tiso]; 14 May 1945 – 10 April 2025) was a French equestrian show jumper. She competed at the 1964, 1968 and 1972 Olympics and won team silver medals in 1964 and 1968. She won the individual world title in 1970 as Lefèbvre and in 1974 as Tissot, as she got married and changed her surname in between. She died on 10 April 2025, at the age of 79.
