= Ricardo Guasch =

Mexican equestrian (1933–2010)

Personal information
- Full name: Ricardo Guasch de la Heras
- Born: 10 November 1933 Mexico City, Mexico
- Died: 22 September 2010 (aged 76)

Sport
- Sport: Equestrian
Medal record
Equestrian
Representing Mexico
Pan American Games
Bronze medal – third place	1979 San Juan	Team jumping

Ricardo Guasch de la Heras (10 November 1933 – 22 September 2010) was a Mexican equestrian. He competed at the 1964 Summer Olympics and the 1968 Summer Olympics.
