= Paul Weier =

Swiss equestrian (born 1934)

Personal information
- Nationality: Swiss
- Born: 3 December 1934 Elgg, Switzerland

Sport
- Sport: Equestrian

Paul Weier (born 3 December 1934) is a Swiss former equestrian. He competed at the 1960, 1964, 1968 and 1972 Summer Olympics.
