= John Fahey (equestrian) =

Australian equestrian

Personal information
- Full name: Thomas John Fahey
- Nationality: Australian
- Born: 27 August 1943 (age 81); Taree, New South Wales, Australia

Sport
- Sport: Equestrian

Thomas John Fahey (born 27 August 1943) is an Australian former equestrian. He competed at the 1964 Summer Olympics and the 1968 Summer Olympics.
