= Graziano Mancinelli =

Italian equestrian (1937–1992)

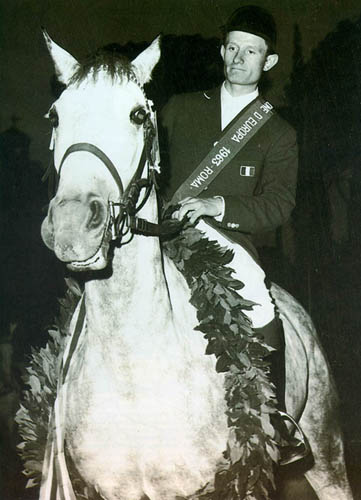
- Mancinelli on Rockette in 1963

Personal information
- Born: 18 February 1937 Milan, Italy
- Died: 8 October 1992 (aged 55) Concesio, Italy
- Height: 175 cm (5 ft 9 in)
- Weight: 77 kg (170 lb)

Sport
- Sport: Equestrian
Medal record
Representing Italy
Olympic Games
Bronze medal – third place	1964 Tokyo	Team jumping
Gold medal – first place	1972 München	Individual jumping
Bronze medal – third place	1972 München	Team jumping
World Championships
Silver medal – second place	1970 La Baule	Individual jumping
European Championships
Bronze medal – third place	1959 Paris	Individual jumping
Gold medal – first place	1963 Rome	Individual jumping

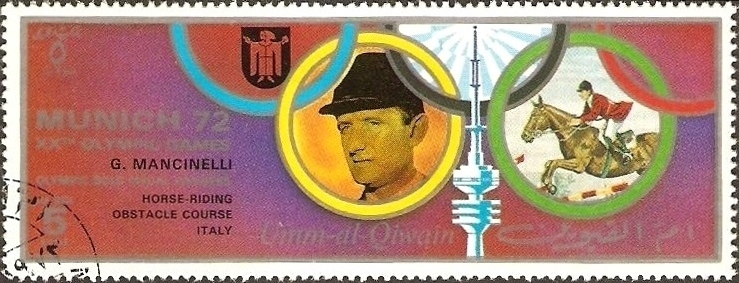
Mancinelli on a stamp of Umm al-Quwain

Graziano Mancinelli (18 February 1937 – 8 October 1992) was an Italian show jumping rider.

== Biography ==
He competed at the 1964, 1968, 1972, 1976 and 1984 Olympics and won one gold and two bronze medals. He was initially banned from the 1964 Olympics, as he was considered a professional rider for the Milan horse-dealing company of Fratelli Rivolta, but the ban was lifted the day before the Olympics. Outside Olympics Mancinelli won a silver medal at the 1970 World Championships, a European title in 1963, and six national titles.

== Awards ==
On 7 May 2015, in the presence of the President of Italian National Olympic Committee (CONI), Giovanni Malagò, was inaugurated in the Olympic Park of the Foro Italico in Rome, along Viale delle Olimpiadi, the Walk of Fame of Italian sport, consisting of 100 tiles that chronologically report names of the most representative athletes in the history of Italian sport. On each tile are the name of the sportsman, the sport in which he distinguished himself and the symbol of CONI. One of these tiles is dedicated to Graziano Mancinelli.

== See also ==
- Legends of Italian sport - Walk of Fame
