= Piero D'Inzeo =

Italian equestrian

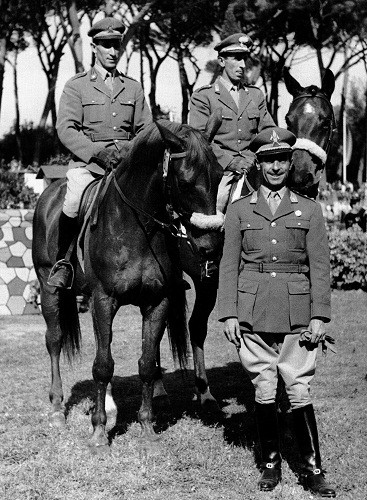
- Piero D'Inzeo (left on the horse)

Personal information
- Nationality: Italian
- Born: 4 March 1923 Rome, Italy
- Died: 13 February 2014 (aged 90) Rome, Italy
- Height: 1.74 m (5 ft 8 1/2 in)
- Weight: 64 kg (141 lb)

Sport
- Country: Italy
- Sport: Equestrian
- Event: Show jumping
- Club: C.S. Carabinieri
Medal record
Olympic Games
Silver medal – second place	1956 Stockholm	Team jumping
Silver medal – second place	1960 Rome	Individual jumping
Bronze medal – third place	1956 Stockholm	Individual jumping
Bronze medal – third place	1960 Rome	Team jumping
Bronze medal – third place	1964 Tokyo	Team jumping
Bronze medal – third place	1972 Munich	Team jumping
European Championships
Gold medal – first place	1959 Paris	Individual jumping
Silver medal – second place	1958 Aachen	Individual jumping
Silver medal – second place	1961 Aachen	Individual jumping
Bronze medal – third place	1962 London	Individual jumping

Colonel Piero D'Inzeo (4 March 1923 – 13 February 2014) was an Italian show jumping rider, winner of six medals at the Olympic Games, and an officer in the Italian cavalry. He was born in Rome.

== Biography ==
With his younger brother Raimondo D'Inzeo, also an officer in the military (but of the Carabinieri), in the international arena they have been called the "invincible brothers" of Italian equestrianism. They participated in numerous competitions in Italy and abroad. At the Olympic Games in 1960 in Rome, Raimondo won the gold medal and Piero the silver medal in the Grand Prix jump obstacles. They were the first athletes to compete in eight Olympic games, consistently from 1948 to 1976. Piero won 2 silver and 4 bronze Olympic medals. He also won the European Championship title in 1959.

He died in February 2014, at the age of 90.

== Achievements ==
- Olympic Games
  - 1956 Stockholm: Silver medal team and individual bronze medal on Uruguay
  - 1960 Rome: Bronze medal team and individual silver medal on The Rock
  - 1964 Tokyo: Bronze medal team on Sun Beam
  - 1972 Munich: Bronze medal team on Easter Light
- European Championships
  - 1958 Aachen: Individual silver medal on The Rock
  - 1959 Paris: Individual gold medal on Uruguay
  - 1961 Aachen: Individual silver medal on The Rock
  - 1962 London: Individual bronze medal on The Rock
- International Grand Prix wins include:
  - 1952 Aachen on Uruguay
  - 1958 Rome on The Rock
  - 1959 Aachen on The Rock
  - 1961 Aachen on The Rock
  - 1961 Amsterdam on Sunbeam
  - 1962 Rome on Sunbeam
  - 1962 Dublin
  - 1965 Aachen on Bally Black
  - 1967 Rome on Navarette
  - 1968 Rome on Fidux
  - 1970 Rome on Red Fox
  - 1973 Rome on Easter Light
  - 1976 Rome on Easter Light

== See also ==
- List of athletes with the most appearances at Olympic Games
- Legends of Italian sport - Walk of Fame
