= Raimondo D'Inzeo =

Italian equestrian (1925–2013)

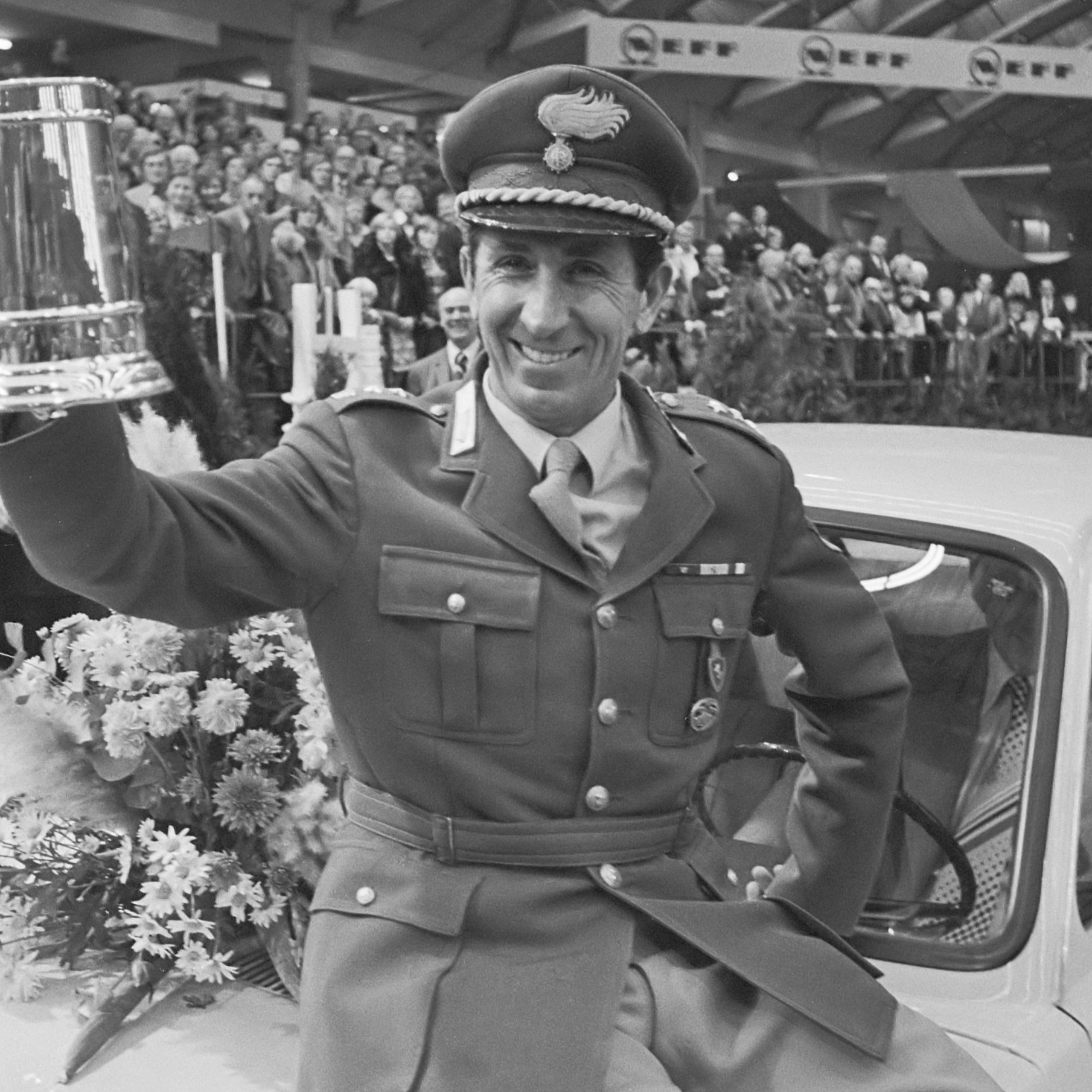
- D'Inzeo in 1976

Personal information
- Nationality: Italian
- Born: 8 February 1925 Poggio Mirteto, Italy
- Died: 15 November 2013 (aged 88) Rome, Italy
- Height: 1.76 m (5 ft 9 1/2 in)
- Weight: 72 kg (159 lb)

Sport
- Country: Italy
- Sport: Equestrian
- Event: Show jumping
- Club: C.S. Carabinieri
Medal record
Olympic Games
Silver medal – second place	1956 Stockholm	Individual jumping
Silver medal – second place	1956 Stockholm	Team jumping
Gold medal – first place	1960 Rome	Individual jumping
Bronze medal – third place	1960 Rome	Team jumping
Bronze medal – third place	1964 Tokyo	Team jumping
Bronze medal – third place	1972 Munich	Team jumping
Show Jumping World Championships
Silver medal – second place	1955 Aachen	Individual jumping
Gold medal – first place	1956 Aachen	Individual jumping
Gold medal – first place	1960 Venice	Individual jumping
Bronze medal – third place	1966 Buenos Aires	Individual jumping

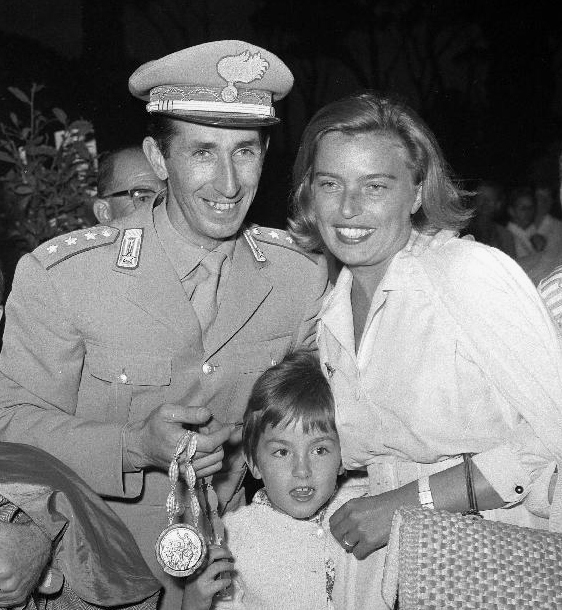
D'Inzeo with family at the 1960 Olympics

Raimondo D'Inzeo (8 February 1925 – 15 November 2013) was an Italian show jumping rider, an Olympic champion and double world champion. Together with his elder brother Piero D'Inzeo, he was the first athlete to compete in eight consecutive Olympic games, in 1948–1976. At the Rome Olympics in 1960 Raimondo won the gold medal and Piero won the silver in show jumping.

Being an officer in the Carabinieri Cavalry Regiment D'Inzeo always wore a uniform when competing in tournaments. Against the irritable and aggressive temperament of Raimondo, Piero was more technical and calculating.

== Achievements ==
- Olympic Games
  - 1956 Stockholm: Silver medal team and individual silver medal on Merano
  - 1960 Rome: Bronze medal team and individual gold medal on Posillipo
  - 1964 Tokyo: Bronze medal team on Posillipo
  - 1972 Munich: Bronze medal team on Fiorello II
- World Championships
  - 1955 Aachen: Individual silver medal on Merano
  - 1956 Aachen: Individual gold medal on Merano
  - 1960 Venice: Individual gold medal on Gowran Girl
  - 1966 Buenos Aires: Individual bronze medal on Bowjak
- International Grand Prix wins
  - 1956 Rome on Merano
  - 1957 Rome on Merano
  - 1963 Aachen on Posillipo
  - 1968 Amsterdam on Bellevue
  - 1969 Dublin on Bellevue
  - 1971 Rome on Fiorello
  - 1974 Rome on Gone Away
  - 1975 Dublin on Bellevue

== See also ==
- List of athletes with the most appearances at Olympic Games
- Italian men gold medalist at the Olympics and World Championships
- Legends of Italian sport - Walk of Fame

Summer Olympics
Preceded by Giuseppe Delfino	Flag bearer for Italy; 1968 Mexico City	Succeeded by Abdon Pamich
