= Equestrian events at the 1964 Summer Olympics =

Equestrian at the Games of the XVIII Olympiad
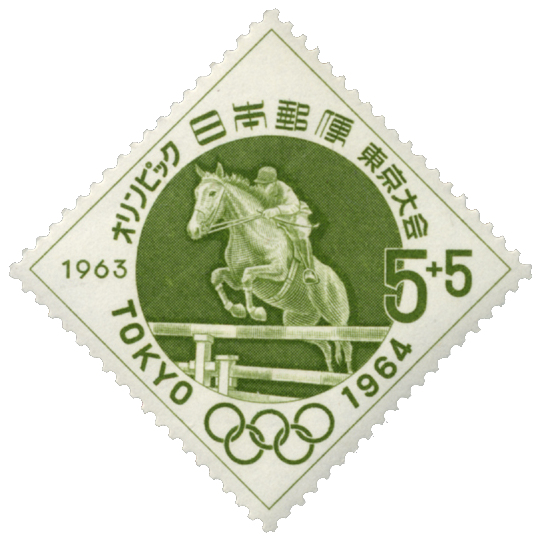
- Equestrian sports at the 1964 Summer Olympics on a stamp of Japan
- Venue: Baji Koen; Karuizawa; National Stadium
- Dates: 16–24 October 1964
- No. of events: 6
- Competitors: 116 from 20 nations

The equestrian events at the 1964 Summer Olympics in Tokyo included show jumping, dressage and eventing. All three disciplines had both individual and team competitions. The competitions were held from 16 to 24 October 1964. These events took place at Karuizawa, which would become the first city to host Summer and Winter Olympic event when it hosted the curling events for the 1998 Winter Olympics in Nagano.

This was the second time the Olympics were held in a city that required most of the horses to travel long distances (the first being the 1932 Olympics in Los Angeles). Unlike the 1932 Games, however, there was a high participation rate due to the better economic conditions as well as the ability to fly the Olympic mounts to Japan. However, horses that could not be controlled had to be destroyed. This included the US eventer Markham, who panicked during departure from Newark, and an Argentinian horse had to be destroyed while flying home. Additionally, a Chilean horse died of a heart attack while flying to Tokyo. Overall there were 116 entries from 20 countries, including 13 women, with 4 nations fielding teams in all three disciplines: Japan, Germany, the USSR, and the USA. The youngest participant was Christilot Hanson-Boylen from Canada at 17 years old, while the oldest rider was the Irish Harry Freeman-Jackson at 53 years old.

== Disciplines ==
=== Show jumping ===
Forty-six riders from seventeen nations contested the Shunzo Kido-designed course, which was 780 meters in length with 14 obstacles and 17 efforts. The hardest question was towards the end of the course. The penultimate obstacle was a 5 meter wide water, followed by a left turn to an impressively large oxer. Only 6 riders cleared the water in both rounds, and only 3 cleared the final oxer without faults both times. Adding to the difficulty was that the ground was very deep due to heavy rain leading up to the event. Pierre Jonquères d’Oriola became the first show jumper to win two individual gold medals (having won in 1952 with his mount Ali Baba).

=== Dressage ===
Dressage reintroduced the team competition after removing it from the 1960 Games. 22 riders from 9 nations competed, and there were just enough teams (6 required by the IOC) to hold a team competition: Germany, Switzerland, Sweden, Japan, the USSR, and the USA. 3 judges were present, first judging a 12-minute 30 second Grand Prix test and announcing scores immediately after each ride. This was followed by the considerably shorter Grand Prix Special, at 6 minutes 30 seconds, which acted as a ride off. Each ride in the Special was filmed and examined by the judges, with a 2-hour delay before the final scores were announced publicly.

=== Eventing ===
Held in Karuizawa, 150 km from Tokyo, the 31-obstacle cross-country course was criticized as being too straightforward for an Olympic Games. Phase A was 6 km at 240 m/min, followed by a 3.6 km steeplechase at 600 m/min, then 13.92 km Phase C at 240 m/min. The cross country was 7.2 km at a speed of 450 m/min, and was followed by Phase E, a 1980-meter gallop at 330 m/min. Italy gained the lead after the endurance day and held it to win the gold medal. Germany was in silver medal position but lost it on the final day to the United States.

American Lana du Pont became the first woman to ride in an Olympic eventing competition.

== Medal summary ==
Games	Gold	Silver	Bronze
Individual dressage	Henri Chammartin and Wörmann; Switzerland	Harry Boldt and Remus; United Team of Germany	Sergei Filatov and Absent; Soviet Union
Team dressage	United Team of Germany; Harry Boldt and Remus; Reiner Klimke and Dux; Josef Neckermann and Antoinette	Switzerland; Henri Chammartin and Wörmann; Gustav Fischer and Wald; Marianne Gossweiler and Stephan	Soviet Union; Sergei Filatov and Absent; Ivan Kizimov and Ikhor; Ivan Kalita and Moar
Individual eventing	Mauro Checcoli and Surbean; Italy	Carlos Moratorio and Chalan; Argentina	Fritz Ligges and Donkosak; United Team of Germany
Team eventing	Italy; Mauro Checcoli and Surbean; Paolo Angioni and King; Giuseppe Ravano and Royal Love	United States; Michael Page and The Grasshopper; Kevin Freeman and Gallopade; Michael Plumb and Bold Minstrel	United Team of Germany; Fritz Ligges and Donkosak; Horst Karsten and Condora; Gerhard Schulz and Balza X
Individual jumping	Pierre Jonquères d'Oriola and Lutteur B France	Hermann Schridde and Dozent II; United Team of Germany	Peter Robeson and Firecrest; Great Britain
Team jumping	United Team of Germany; Hermann Schridde and Dozent II; Kurt Jarasinski and Torro; Hans Günter Winkler and Fidelitas	France; Pierre Jonquères d'Oriola and Lutteur B Janou Lefèbvre and Kenavo D Guy Lefrant and Monsieur de Littry	Italy; Piero D'Inzeo and Sun Beam; Raimondo D'Inzeo and Posillipo; Graziano Mancinelli and Rockette

== Medal table ==
Rank	Nation	Gold	Silver	Bronze	Total
1	United Team of Germany	2	2	2	6
2	Italy	2	0	1	3
3	France	1	1	0	2
3	Switzerland	1	1	0	2
5	Argentina	0	1	0	1
5	United States	0	1	0	1
7	Soviet Union	0	0	2	2
8	Great Britain	0	0	1	1
Totals (8 entries)		6	6	6	18

== Officials ==
Appointment of officials was as follows:

Dressage

- (Czechoslovakia) Frantisek Jandl (Ground Jury President)
- (Sweden) Gustaf Nyblæus (Ground Jury Member)
- (France) Georges Margot (Ground Jury Member)

Jumping

- (Spain) José M. Cavanillas (Ground Jury President)
- (Argentina) Pedro O. Mayorga (Ground Jury Member)
- (Japan) Kohei Yusa (Ground Jury Member)
- (Japan) Shunzo Kido (Course Designer)
- (Italy) Bruno Bruni (Technical Delegate)

Eventing

- (Sweden) Gustaf Nyblæus (Ground Jury President)
- (Chile) Hernan Vigil Simpson (Ground Jury Member)
- (Bulgaria) Vladimir Stoytchev (Ground Jury Member)
- (Japan) Shunzo Kido (Course Designer)
- (Argentina) Pedro O. Mayorga (Technical Delegate)
