= Diane Crump =

American jockey (1948–2026)

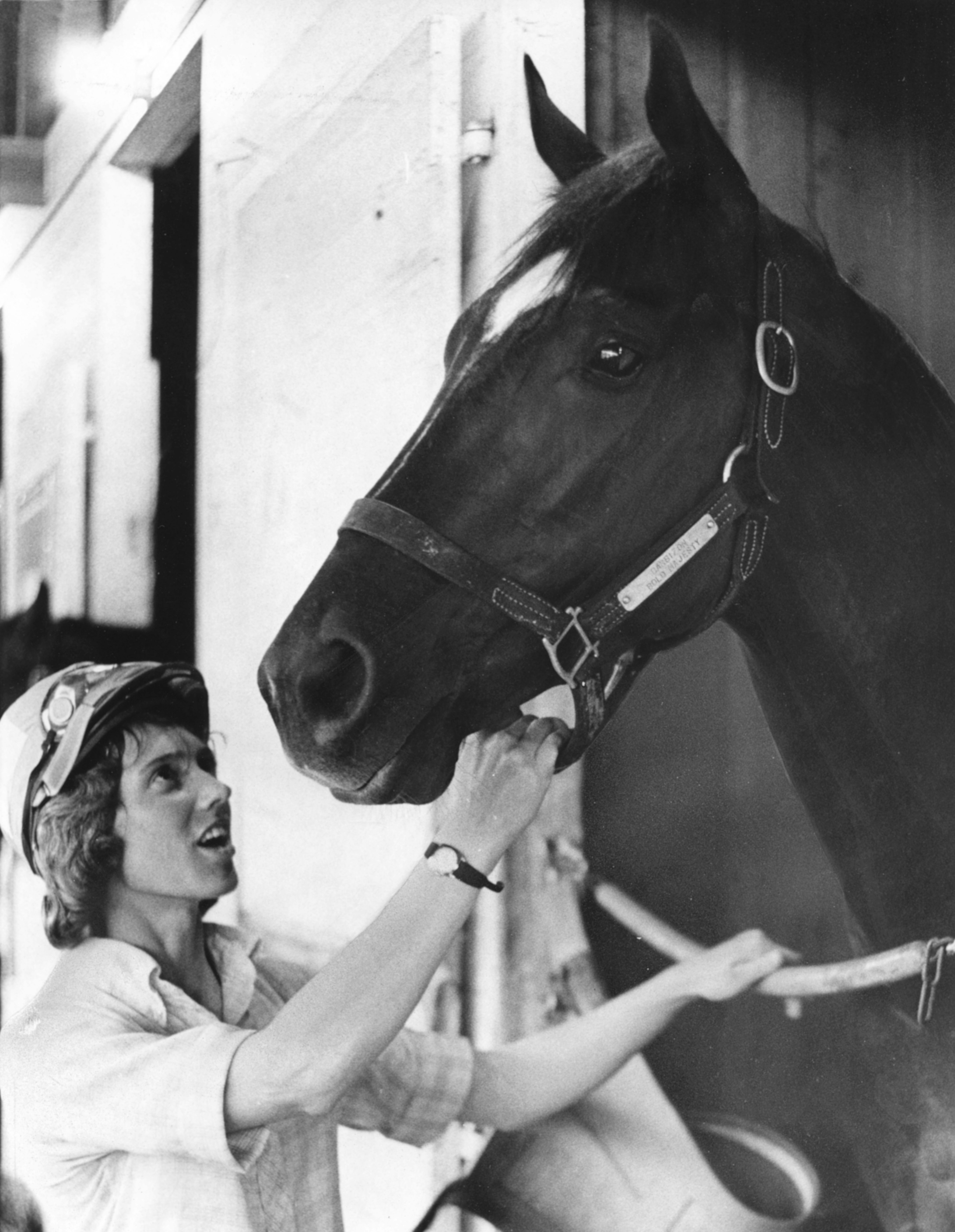
- Crump in 1970

Personal information
- Nationality: American
- Born: May 18, 1948 Milford, Connecticut, U.S.
- Died: January 1, 2026 (aged 77) Winchester, Virginia, U.S.
- Occupations: Jockey, horse trainer

Horse racing career
- Sport: Horse racing
- Career wins: 228+

Honours
- First woman to ride in a professional horse race in the United States, first woman to ride in the Kentucky Derby

Significant horses
- Bridle 'n Bit

Diane Crump (May 18, 1948 – January 1, 2026) was an American jockey and horse trainer. In 1969 Crump was the first woman to ride in a pari-mutuel race in the United States; her participation in the event was so contested that she required a full police escort through the crowds at the Hialeah Park Race Track. In 1970 she became the first woman to ride in the Kentucky Derby. Crump briefly retired in 1985 to become a horse trainer, but returned to riding and was a professional jockey until retiring in 1999. She ran an equine sales business.

== Early years ==
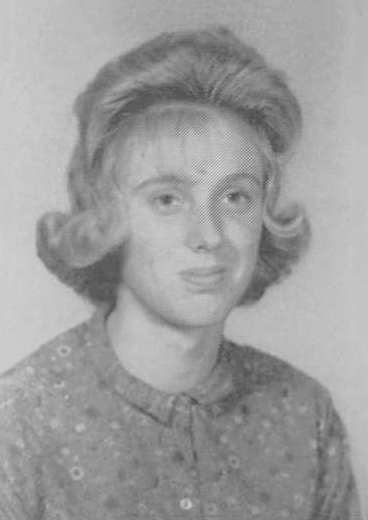
Diane Crump, high school yearbook portrait, 1965

Diane Crump was born in Milford, Connecticut, on May 18, 1948, the daughter of Walter and Jean Crump. Crump had an early interest in horses, despite living in an area almost devoid of their presence. She fueled her love for horses through books, pictures and art instead, and continued to build upon this passion. When she was a pre-teen her family moved to Oldsmar, Florida, and she began taking riding lessons when she was 13. She begged her parents and created a detailed plan working odd jobs here and there to save money in order to help fund the purchase of her first pony.

== Career accomplishments ==
On February 7, 1969, Crump became the first woman to compete as a professional jockey in a pari-mutuel race in the United States. She rode a horse named Bridle 'n Bit at Hialeah Park Race Track. There was so much hostility to a woman riding in a horse race that she needed a police escort to get to the track, taking her through an angry crowd of shouting people. Crump ultimately finished 9th in the 12-horse race and returned to cheers of support. Crump reflected on that experience, recalling that her excitement surrounding this opportunity enabled her to ignore the toxic environment of the crowd and aggressively negative attitudes of the male jockeys, trainers and owners. Two weeks later, Crump rode her first winning race. She recalled in a CNN interview:

The crowd was just swarming all over me. They were crazy, up in arms ... The hecklers were yelling: "Go back to the kitchen and cook dinner." That was the mentality at the time. They thought I was going to be the downfall of the whole sport, which is such a medieval thought. I was like: "Come on people, this is the 1960s!"

Crump was inspired to apply for her jockey's license in the fall of 1968 after the very first woman licensed jockey, Kathryn Kusner, sued the Maryland Racing Commission for the right to be granted a license. Kusner had previously been denied a jockey's license because of her gender and although she won her case in October 1968 and was granted a license, she suffered an injury soon after that prevented her from competing, allowing Crump to step forward and assume the responsibilities of a revolutionary female jockey. While Crump was granted the jockey's license in 1968, she continued to face sexist rules, regulations and personal harassment as she attempted to further her career in horse racing.

Throughout 1968, all female jockeys were being met with aggressive efforts to dissuade their participation in the sport. One of the part owners of Churchill Downs, W. L. Lyons Brown, who Crump was galloping for at the time she was granted her license, requested that Crump not compete in races in Kentucky for fear that it would create too much controversy for Churchill Downs as a track. Female jockey Penny Ann Early attempted to ride at Churchill at that same time, however she was never given the opportunity to compete in the races due to all the male jockeys boycotting her races and causing their cancellations. Two other women had been forced out of horse races they had entered after male jockeys threw rocks at the trailers used as locker rooms by the women and threatened a boycott. The situation changed at Hialeah because the track officials threatened sanctions against the male jockeys.

In 1970, Crump became the first female jockey to ride in the Kentucky Derby. Crump won the first race on the undercard that day, and then on a horse named Fathom, came in 15th in a 17-horse field in the Derby. By the time she ended her racing career in 1985, she had ridden to 235 wins, though she is officially credited with 228 by Equibase.

While Crump was riding some races in the United States, she was also receiving invitations to ride in Puerto Rico and Venezuela. In the early 1970s Crump competed in a two horse race in Puerto Rico which lacked the same rule structure as American racing. During the race, she realized the male jockey behind her was holding onto her saddle. She then began to hit him with her whip; they spent the rest of the race hitting each other. He then pulled away from her and won the race.

== Injuries ==
On February 1, 1989, Crump suffered a broken leg, ankle and ribs from a riding accident and was hospitalized for ten days. Crump was crushed underneath her horse after it reared up and fell backwards. Her leg was broken in 6 or 7 different places. After being in the hospital she was told by doctors she would never be able to ride again. Crump had several injuries in her career as a jockey but this one was by far the most threatening. After this injury, Crump took her time to recover and eventually ride again although all of the injuries she experienced over the years caught up with her, leading to her permanent retirement in 1999 when she moved on to training.

== Post-career ==
When Crump retired for a time in 1985, and beginning in 1991 continuously, she worked as a trainer for a small stable of horses at the Middleburg Training Center in Virginia. She resumed race riding in 1992 and rode races through 1998. She retired from racing in 1999. She ran an equine sales business and lived in Virginia.

== Personal life and death ==
Crump was married to trainer Don Divine from 1969 to 1987. In 1985 she took her first break from riding, in order to put down roots in one place as her young daughter at the time was about to begin school. At this time she worked as a farm trainer for Calumet Farm in Lexington, Kentucky, where she stayed for over three years.

In 2020, a biography, Diane Crump: A Horse Racing Pioneer's Life in the Saddle, by Mark Shrager, was published.

Crump was diagnosed with glioblastoma in 2025. Her family set up a GoFundMe to raise money for the associated medical expenses. She died on January 1, 2026, in Winchester, Virginia, at the age of 77.
