= Cheryl White =

Cheryl White may refer to:

- Cheryl White (singer), American country singer
- Cheryl White (jockey) (1953–2019), horse racing jockey and horse racing steward
