= Harriet S. Iglehart =

American philanthropist (1927–2021)

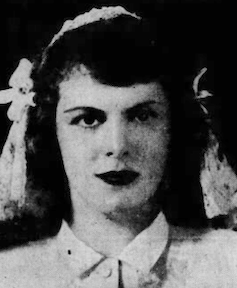
- Harriet Stokes Iglehart, from a 1947 bridal portrait
- Born: Harriet Austen Stokes; May 2, 1927; Baltimore, Maryland
- Died: July 1, 2021 (aged 94); Monkton, Maryland
- Occupations: Equestrian, philanthropist, arts patron, writer

Harriet S. Iglehart (May 2, 1927 – July 1, 2021) was an American equestrian, philanthropist, arts patron, and writer, based in Baltimore County, Maryland.

== Early life and education ==
Harriet Austen Stokes was born in Baltimore, the daughter of John A. Stokes and Elaine Vandenberg Lord Stokes. Her father had a real estate firm, and a dairy farm in Glencoe, Maryland where she lived as a child. Her kinswoman Anna Austen McCulloch founded the Oldfields School.

Stokes graduated from Greenwood School in Ruxton in 1945. She attended Goucher College before she married at age 19; she later earned her bachelor's and master's degrees in English literature in evening classes at Johns Hopkins University, in 1978 and 1981 respectively.

== Career ==
As a girl, Stokes was a champion equestrian. In adulthood, she ran a working farm, participated in equestrian events, and wrote about equestrian and other topics for Maryland Horse, Mid-Atlantic Thoroughbred, and other publications. She was also editor of the Elkridge-Harford Hunt Club newsletter for 23 years. In 1972 she was appointed to a statewide commission to study cable television regulation in Maryland.

Iglehart and her husband worked for racial integration in schools and for housing for veterans. Her husband was chair of the Baltimore County Human Rights Commission. The Igleharts established the Francis N. “Ike” and Harriet S. Iglehart Fund, for civil rights and social justice causes. In 1994 they gave "perpetual conservation easement" to their 316-acre farm in Monkton to the Maryland Environmental Trust, to maintain it as wetlands and undeveloped open space. It was "one of the largest easements ever donated to the Trust in Baltimore County." Iglehart supported and volunteered with many other causes, including the Maryland Historical Society, St. James Episcopal Church, the Oldfields School, the Manor Conservancy, Ladew Topiary Gardens, Baltimore Tree Trust and Flowering Trails, Baltimore Actors Theater, Baltimore Center Stage and Planned Parenthood. She was a member of the Maryland Horse Breeders Association.

== Personal life ==
Harriet Stokes married lawyer and World War II veteran Francis Nash Iglehart Jr. in 1947. They had five children, and moved to their farm in Monkton in 1958. Her husband died in 2007; she died in 2021, aged 94 years, from heart failure, at her farm in Monkton. There is a Francis & Harriet Iglehart Professor of Law named chair at the University of Maryland, named in their honor.
