= Hoof =

Tip of a toe of an ungulate mammal, strengthened by a thick and horny keratin covering

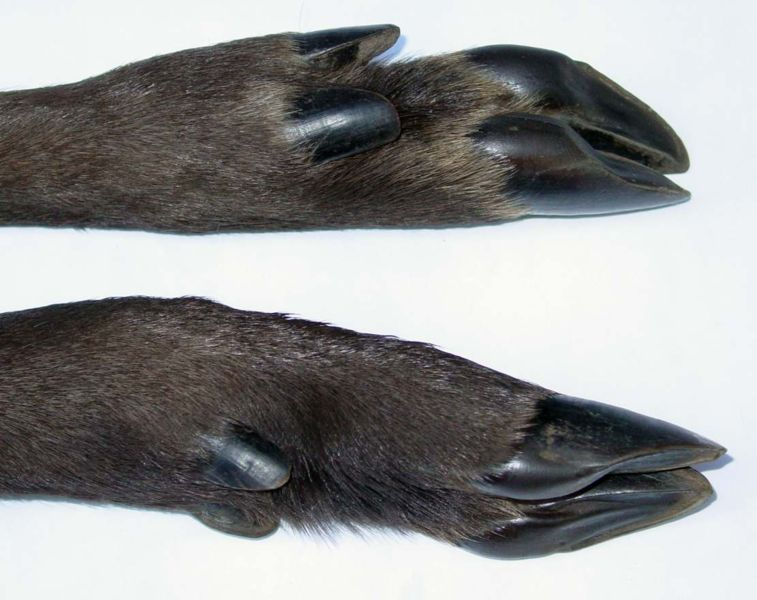
The feet of the roe deer (Capreolus capreolus) have cloven hooves with prominent dewclaws.

The hoof (pl.: hooves or hoofs) is the tip of a toe of an ungulate mammal, which is covered and strengthened with a thick and horny keratin covering.

Hooves are present in some even-toed and odd-toed placental mammals, as well as in some nonmammalians.

- Artiodactyls (Ancient Greek: ἄρτιος : ártios "even", and δάκτυλος : dáktulos "toe") are even-toed ungulates, species whose feet have an even number of digits; the ruminants with two digits are the most numerous, e.g. giraffe, deer, bison, cattle, goats, gazelles, antelopes, pigs, and sheep.
- The feet of perissodactyl (Ancient Greek: περισσός : perissós : uneven", and δάκτυλος : dáktulos "toe") mammals have an odd number of toes, e.g. the horse, the rhinoceros, and the tapir.
- Although hooves are limb structures primarily found in placental mammals, hadrosaurs such as Edmontosaurus possessed hoofed hindlimbs. The marsupial Chaeropus also had hooves.

== Description ==
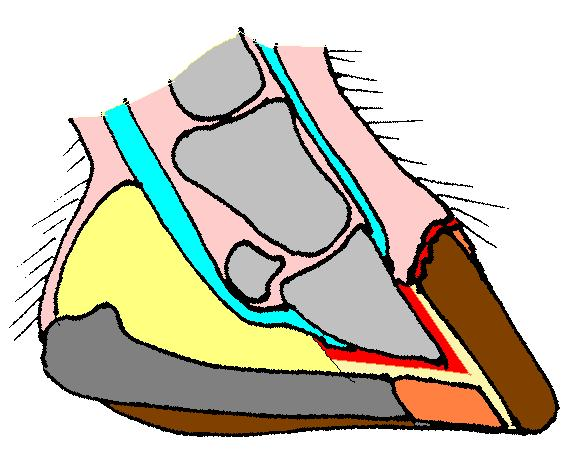
Sagittal section of a horse hoof. Pink: soft tissues; light gray: bone; cyan: tendons; red: corium; yellow: digital cushion; dark gray: frog; orange: sole; brown: walls

The hoof surrounds the distal end of the second phalanx, the distal phalanx, and the navicular bone. The hoof consists of the hoof wall, the bars of the hoof, the sole and frog and soft tissue shock absorption structures. The weight of the animal is normally borne by both the sole and the edge of the hoof wall. Hooves perform many functions, including supporting the weight of the animal, dissipating the energy impact as the hooves strike the ground or surface, protecting the tissues and bone within the hoof capsule, and providing traction for the animal. Numerous factors can affect hoof structure and health, including genetics, hoof conformation, environmental influences, nutrition, and athletic performance of the animal. The ideal hoof has a parallel hoof-pastern axis, a thick hoof wall, adequate sole depth, a solid heel base and growth rings of equal size under the coronary band.

There are four layers within the exterior wall of the hoof. From the outside, a hoof is made up of the stratum externum, the stratum medium, the stratum internum and the dermis parietis. The stratum externum and the stratum medium are difficult to distinguish, the stratum externum is thin and the stratum medium is what makes up the bulk of the hoof wall. Inside the hoof wall is a laminar junction, a soft tissue structure that allows the hoof to withstand the demands of force transmission it undergoes. This tissue structure binds the inner surface of the hoof wall, the dermis parietis and the outer surface of the third phalanx.

Most even-toed ungulates (such as sheep, goats, deer, cattle, bison and pigs) have two main claws on each foot, together called a cloven hoof. Most of these cloven-hooved animals also have two smaller hooves called dewclaws a little further up the leg – these are not normally used for walking, but in some species with larger dewclaws (such as deer and pigs) they may touch the ground when running or jumping, or if the ground is soft. In the mountain goat, the dewclaw serves to provide extra traction when descending rocky slopes as well as additional drag on loose or slippery surfaces made of ice, dirt, or snow. Other cloven-hooved animals (such as giraffes and pronghorns) have no dewclaws.

In some cloven-hooved animals, such as camels, the "hoof" is not properly a hoof – it is not a hard or rubbery sole with a hard wall formed by a thick nail – instead it is a soft toe with little more than a nail merely having an appearance of a hoof.

Some odd-toed ungulates (equids) have one hoof on each foot; others have (or had) three distinct hooved or heavily nailed toes, or one hoof and two dewclaws. The tapir is a special case, having three toes on each hind foot and four toes on each front foot.

== Management ==
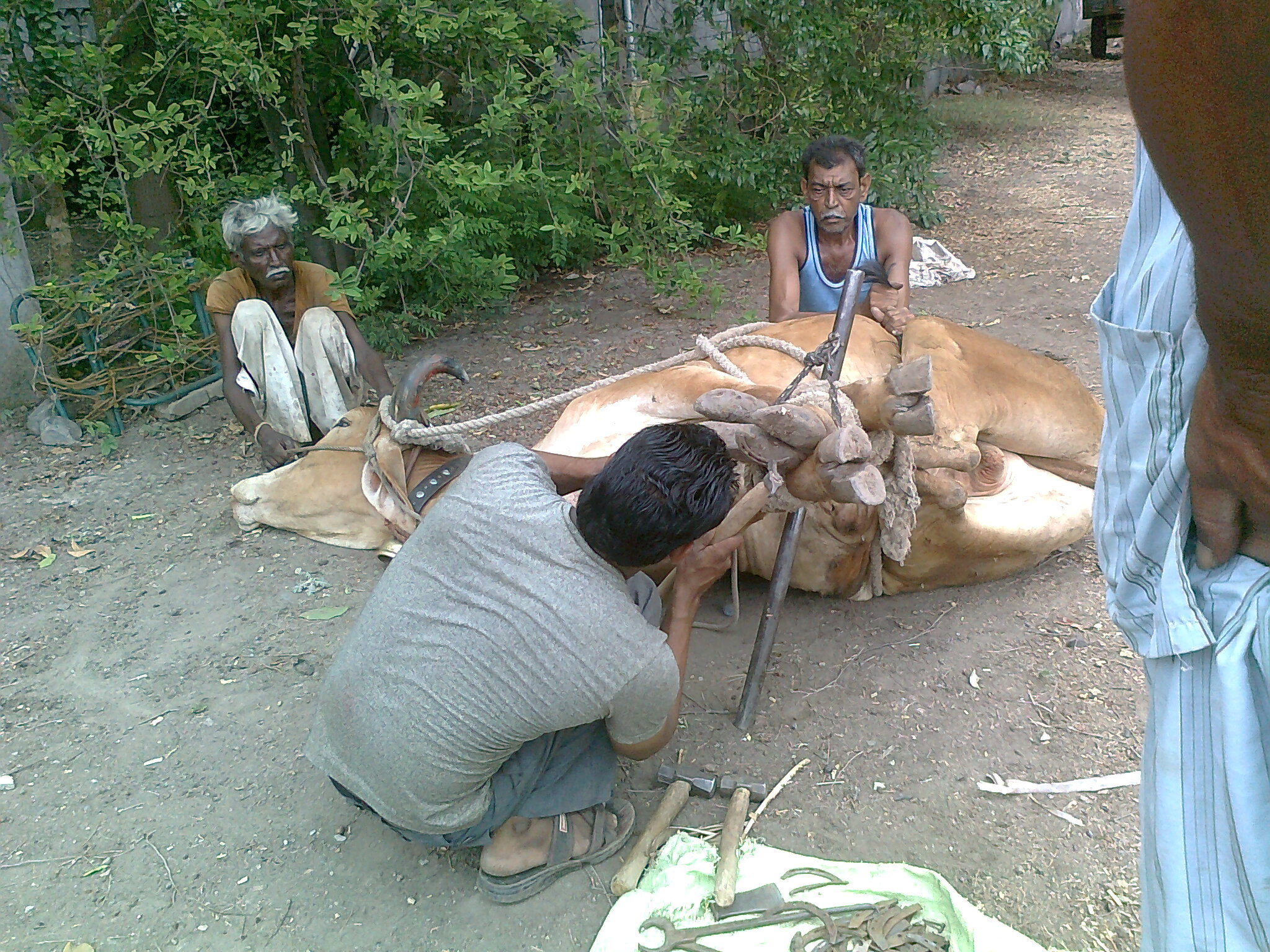
An oxshoe is being nailed on the hooves of a bull used for draft at Chinawal, India, to prevent them from wearing out too much.

Hooves grow continuously. In nature, wild animals will wear down their hooves at roughly the same rate as their continuous growth, keeping them in balance. However, captive domesticated species often must undergo specific hoof care for a healthy, functional hoof. Proper care improves biomechanical efficiency and prevents lameness. If not worn down enough by use, such as in the dairy industry, hooves may need to be trimmed. For animals who put unusually heavy stress on their hooves, such as horses or work oxen that routinely walk on hard surfaces and carry heavy weight, they risk damage to their hooves from too much wear. For this reason, horseshoes and oxshoes are used.

=== Horses ===
Within the equine world, the expression, "no foot, no horse" emphasizes the importance of hoof health. Hoof care is important in the equine industry. Problems that can arise with poor horse hoof care include hoof cracks, thrush, abscesses and laminitis.

=== Cattle ===
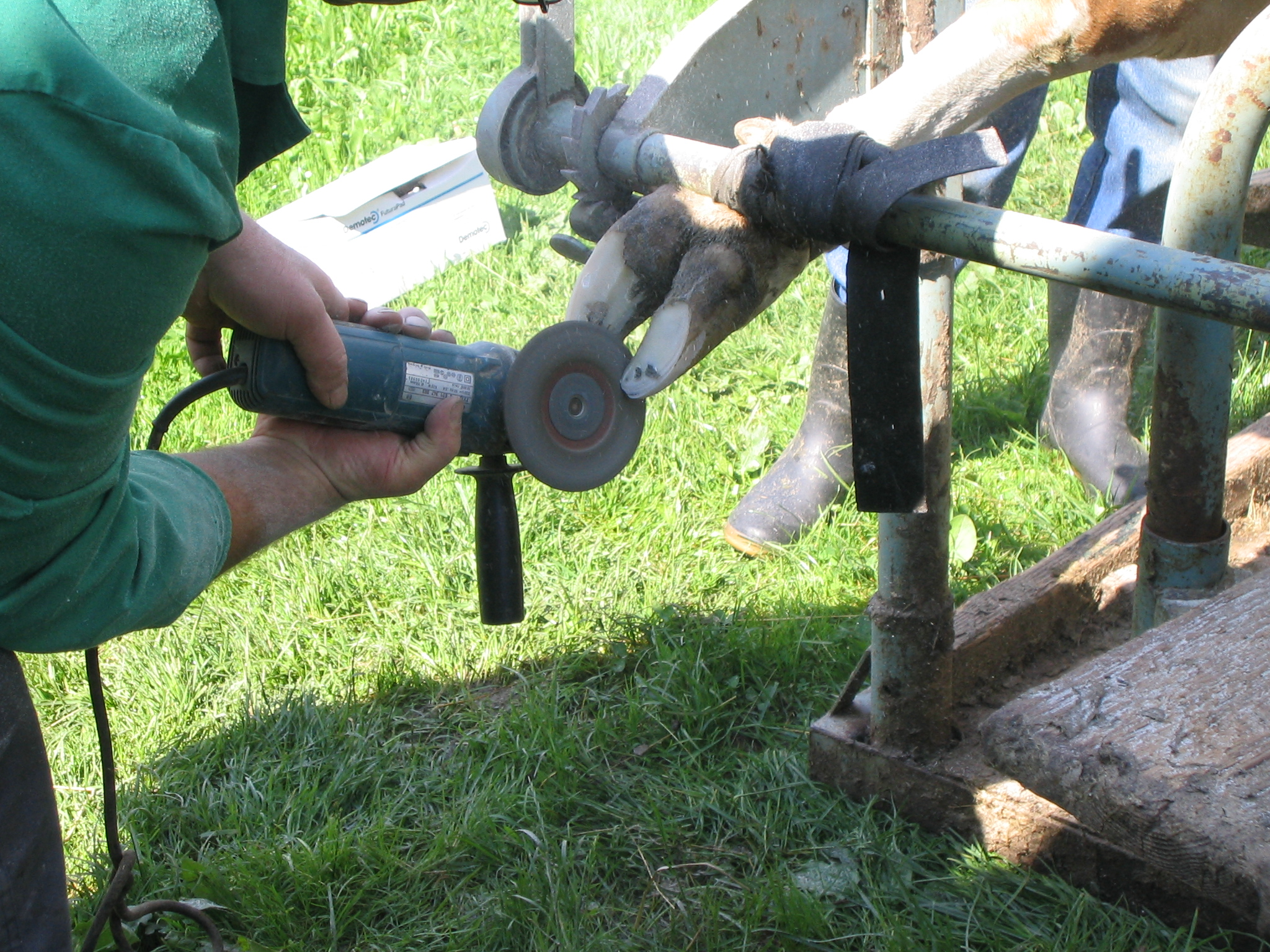
Trimming the hoof of a cow with an angle grinder

A cow hoof is cloven, or divided, into two approximately equal parts, usually called claws. Approximately 95% of lameness in dairy cattle occurs in the feet. Lameness in dairy cows can reduce milk production and fertility, and cause reproductive problems and suffering. For dairy farm profitability, lameness, behind only infertility and mastitis, is the third most important cow health issue.

Hoof trimmers trim and care for bovine hooves, usually dairy cows. Hooves can be trimmed with a sharp knife while the cow is restrained and positioned with ropes. Professional hoof trimmers tend to use angle grinders and some type of hoof trimming crush to make the process quicker and less physically demanding on the hoof trimmer. A hoof trimmer using modern machinery may trim the hooves of more than 10,000 cows per year. The trimmer shapes the hooves to provide the optimal weight-bearing surface. A freshly trimmed hoof may be treated with copper sulfate pentahydrate to prevent foot rot.

=== Goats ===
Domesticated goats kept on rocky terrain can maintain their hooves on their own, similar to wild goats. Extensive farming styles that allow goats to roam over a relatively large amount of territory also lets most goats handle hoof management on their own, as can very active breeds such as Kiko goats raised for meat. However, goats raised on soft terrain often require occasional hoof trimming every 3 months or so from a human tender. This is common with dairy goat and fiber goat husbandry.

== Gallery ==
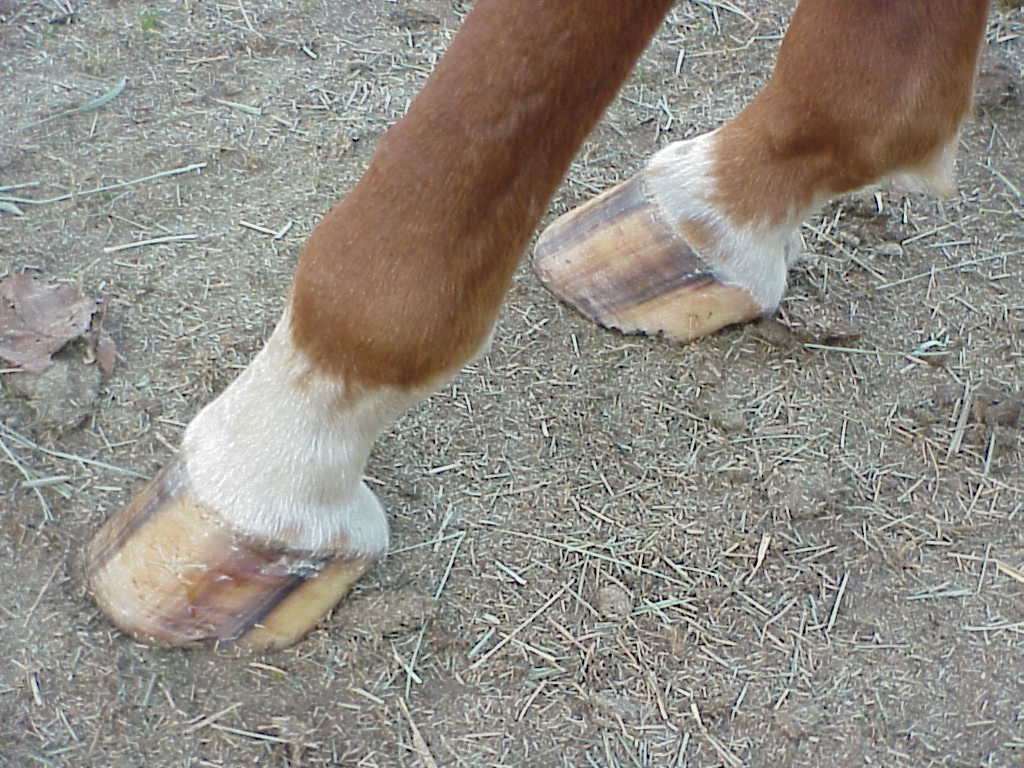
Rear hooves of a horse

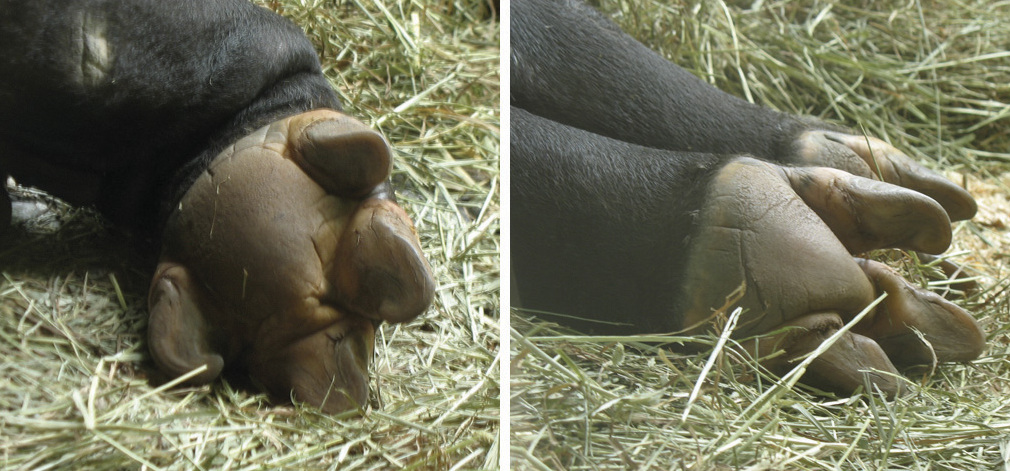
Malayan tapir hooves: front with four toes, back with three toes

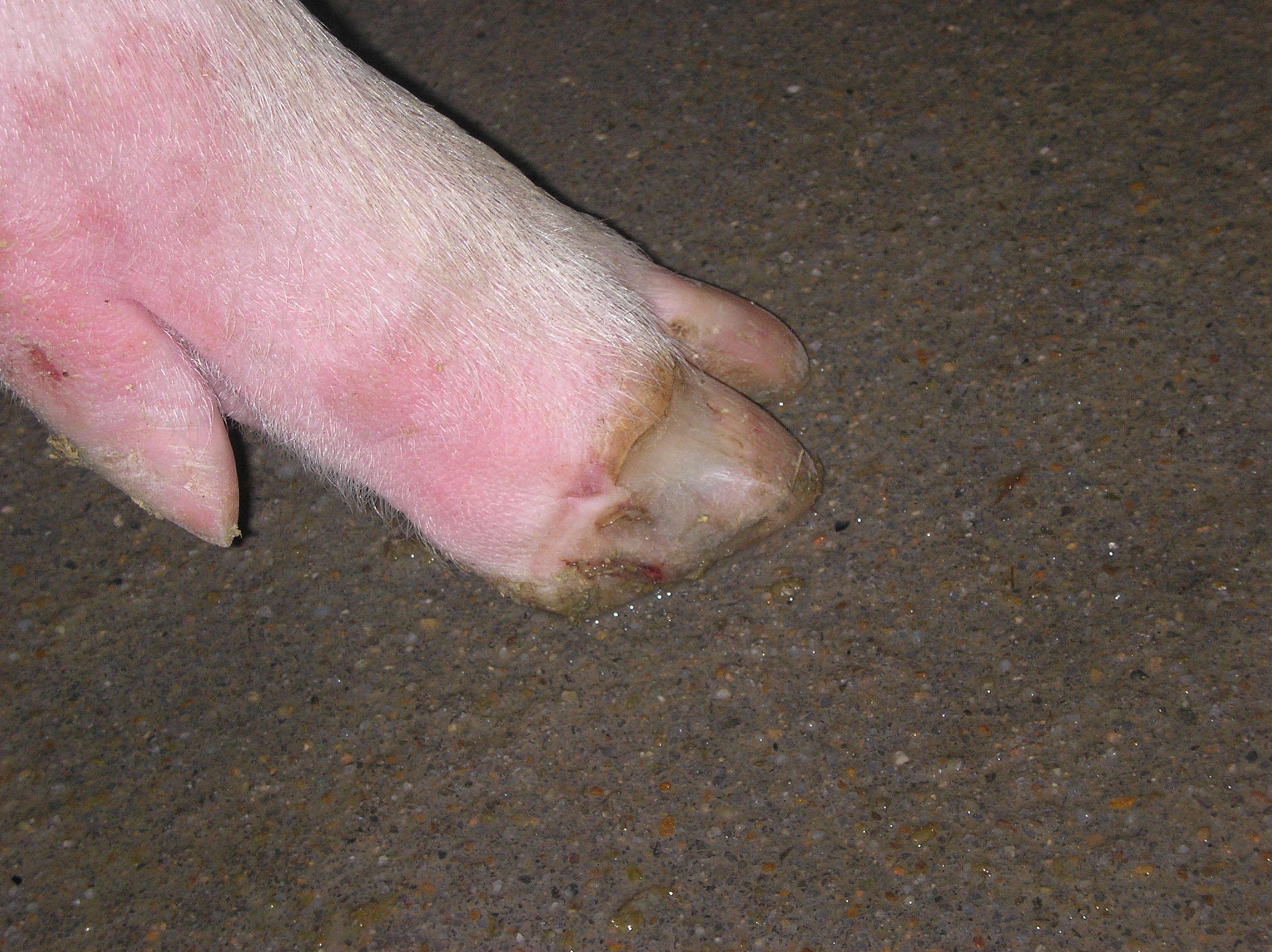
Cloven hooves of a pig

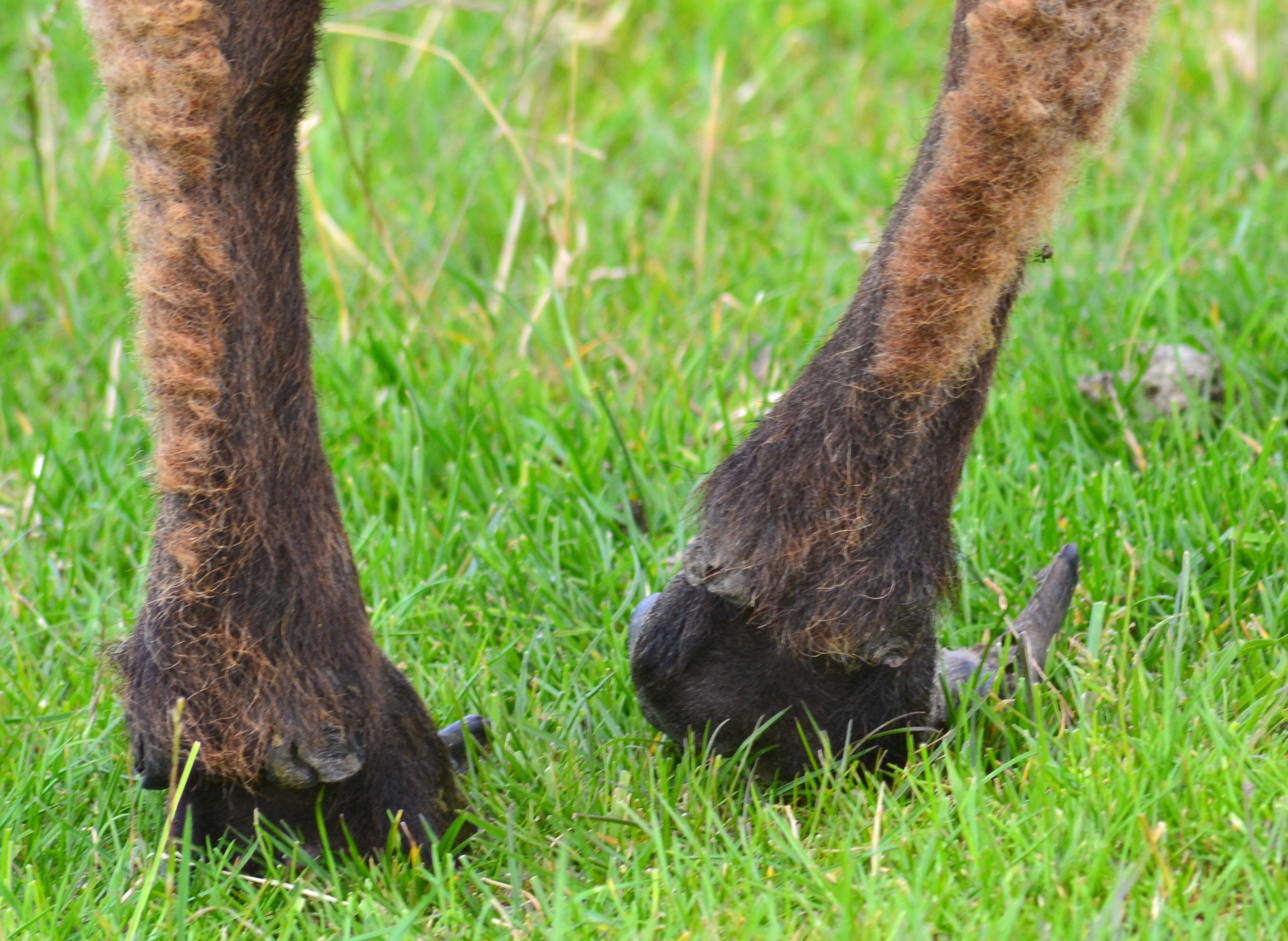
Sheep hooves

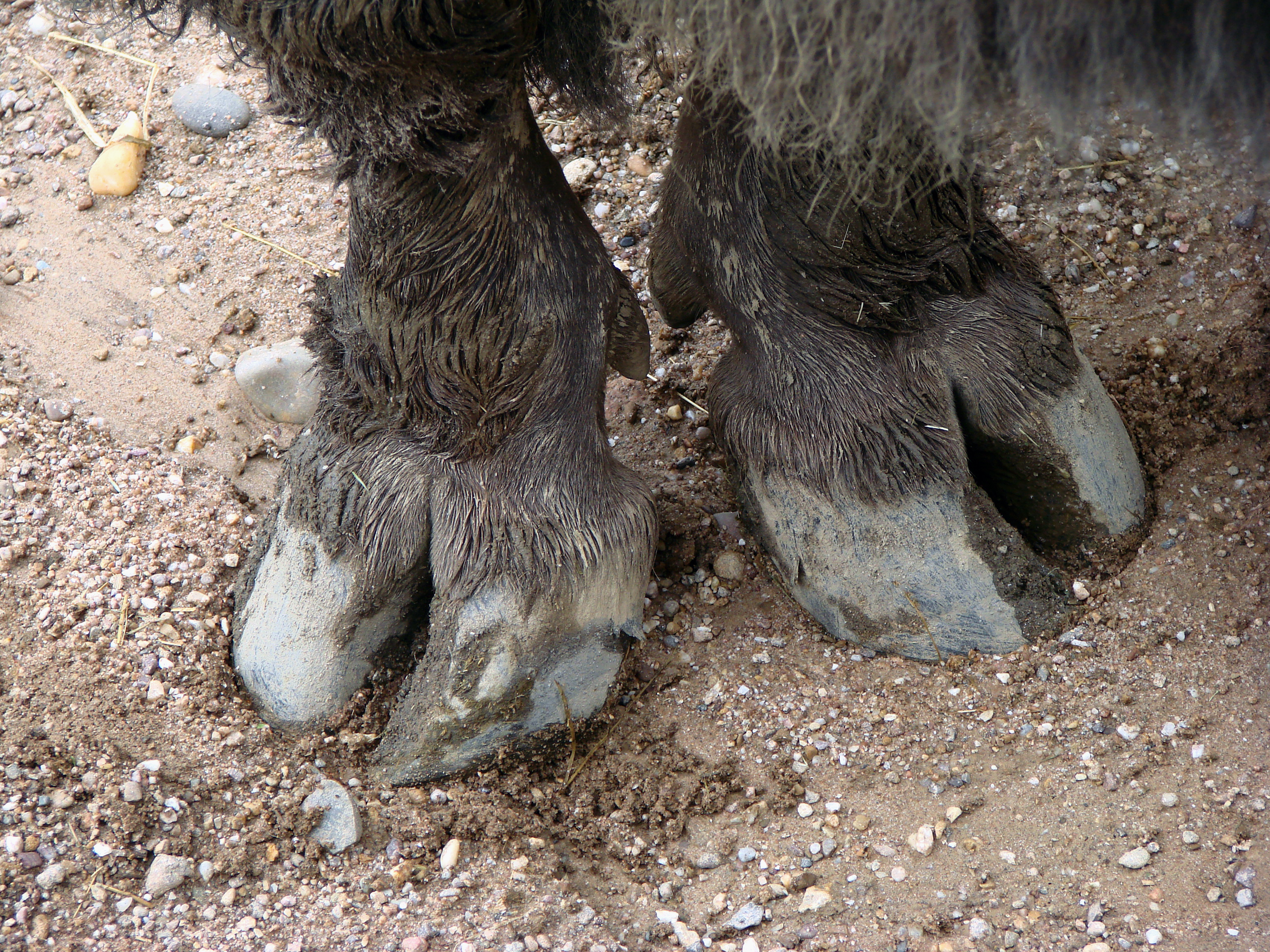
Pointed hooves of a bison

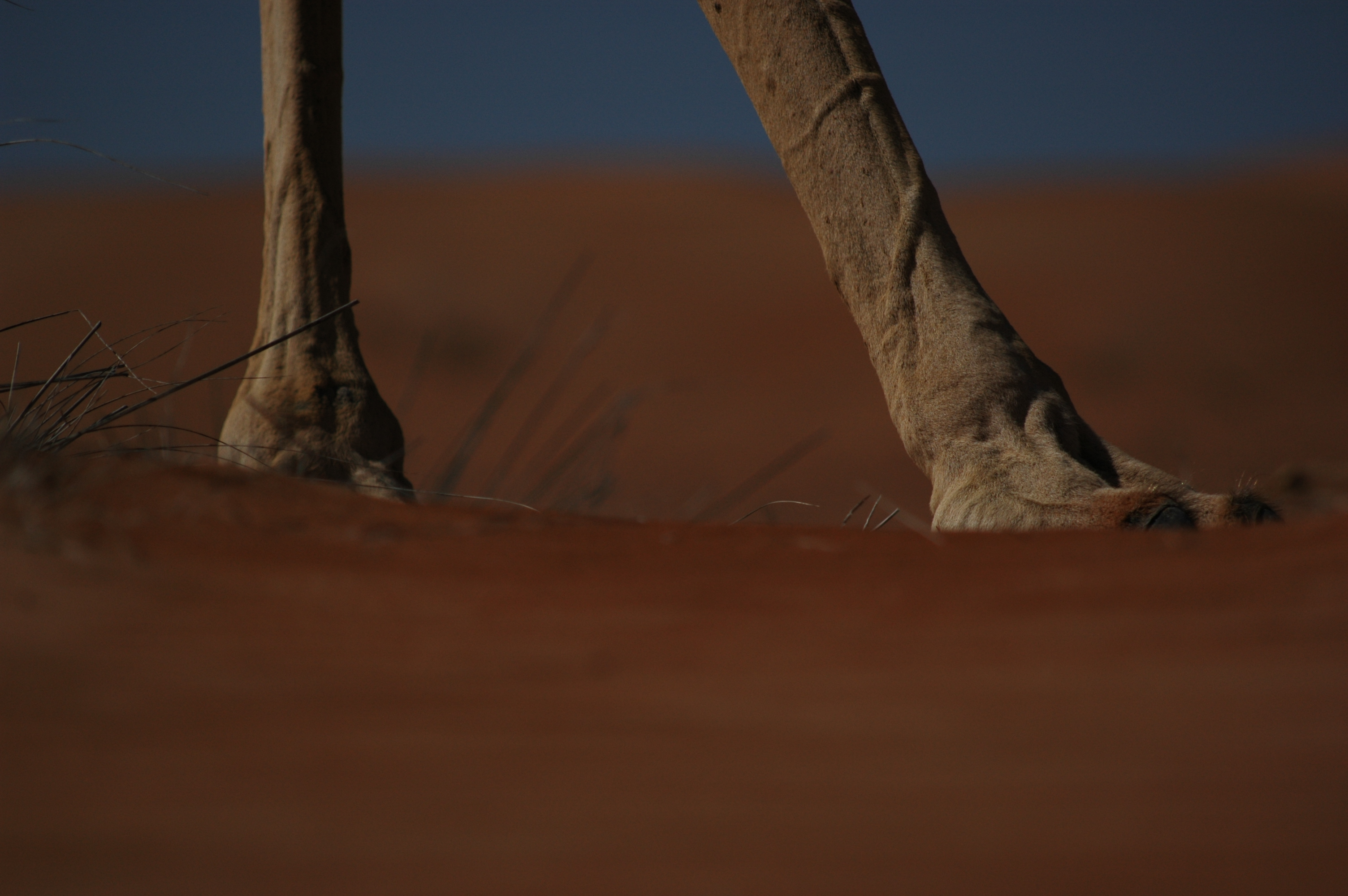
Broad hooves of a camel

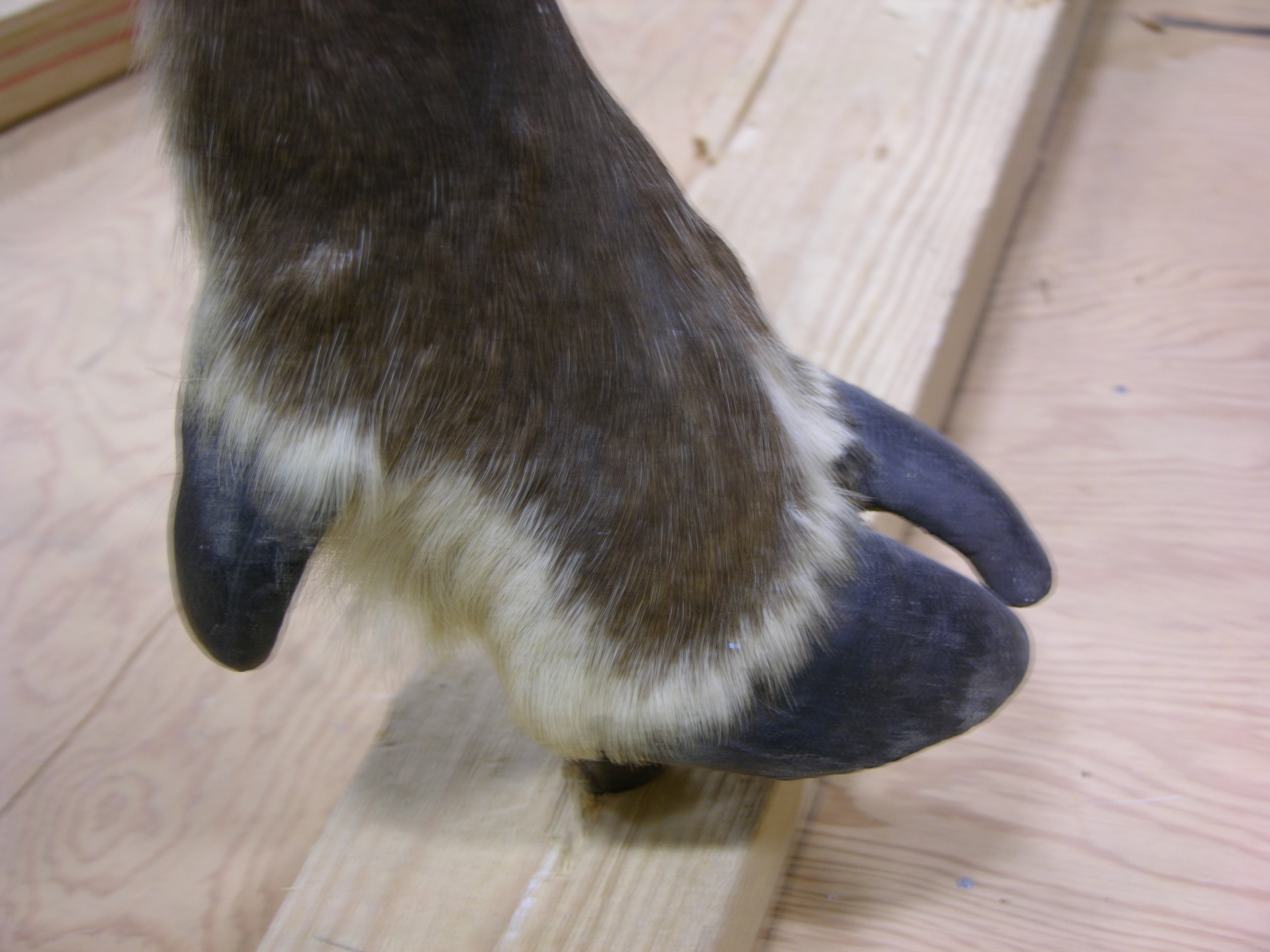
Reindeer hooves

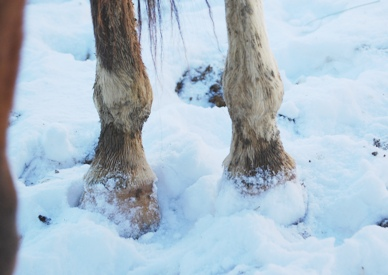
Horses' hooves in snow

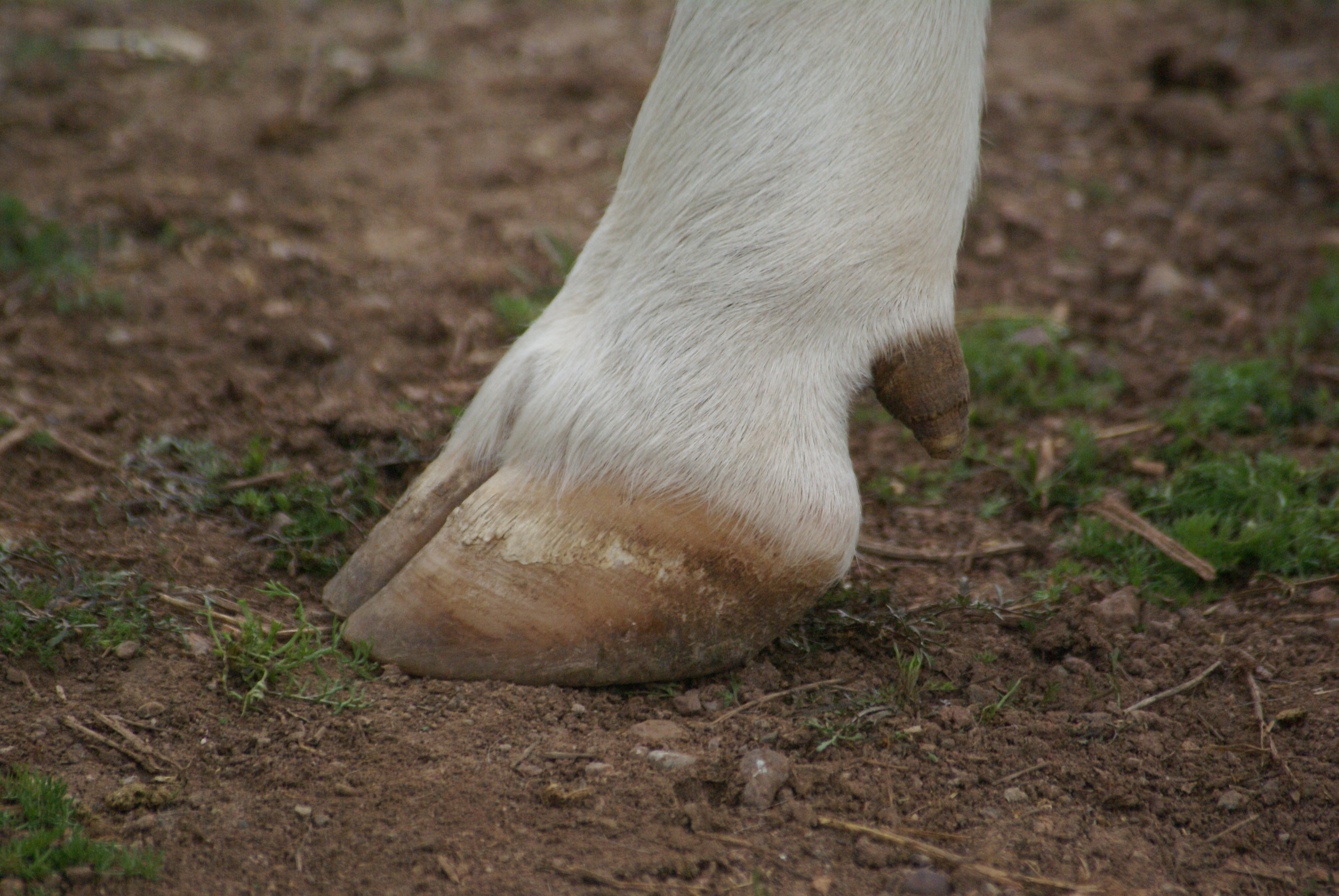
Cattle hooves

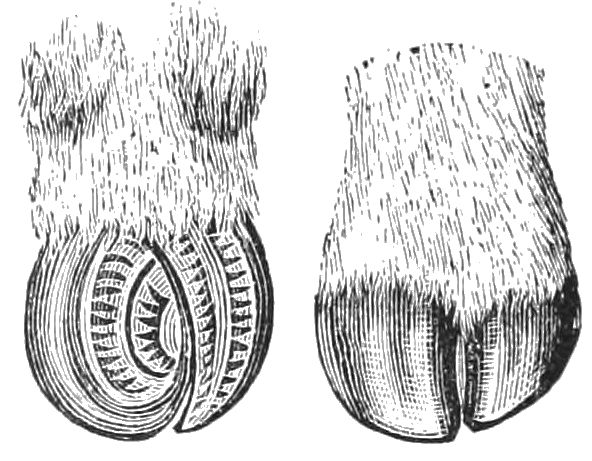
Muskoxen broad hooves

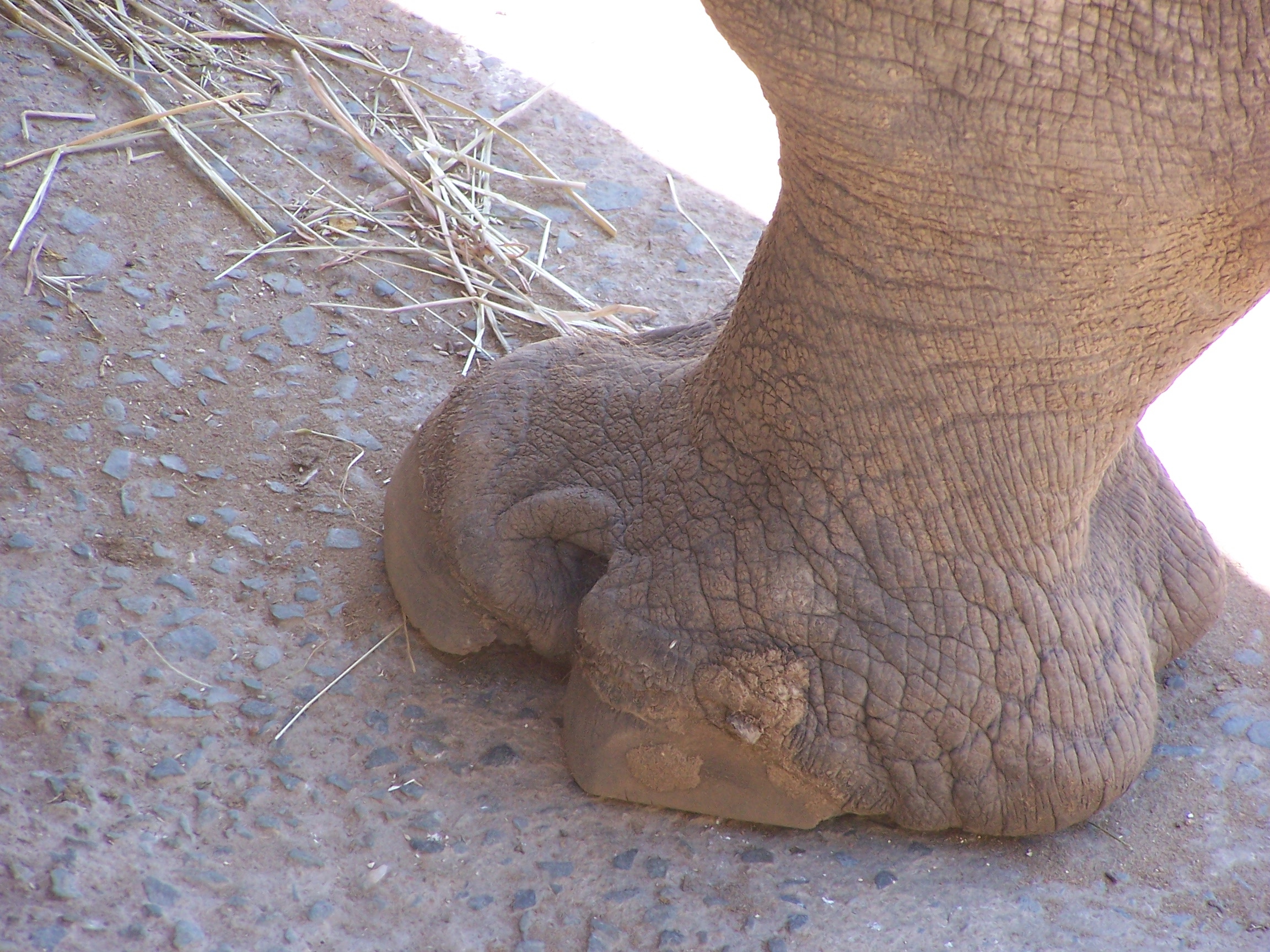
White rhinoceroses' hoof

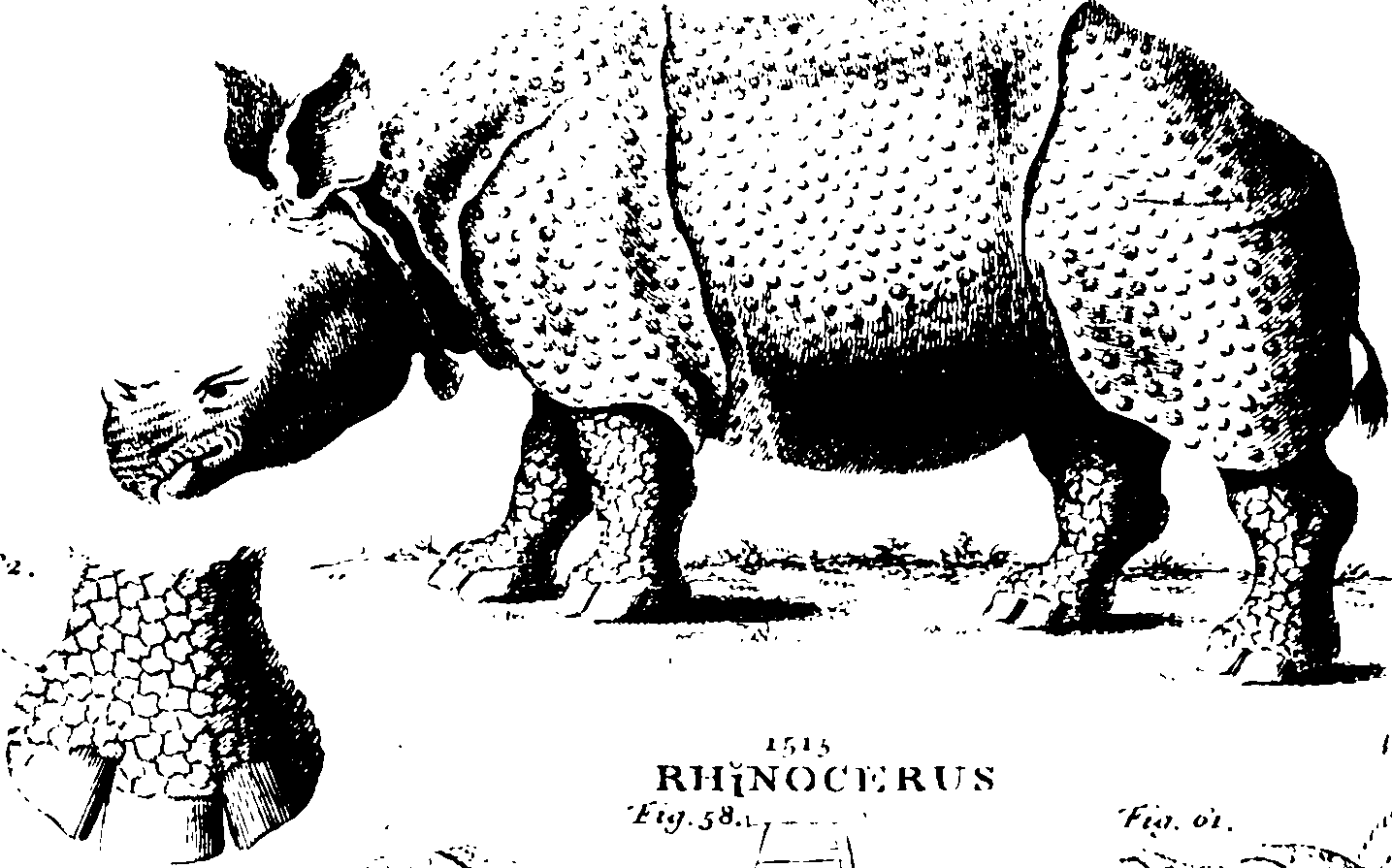
Rhinoceroses' hooves

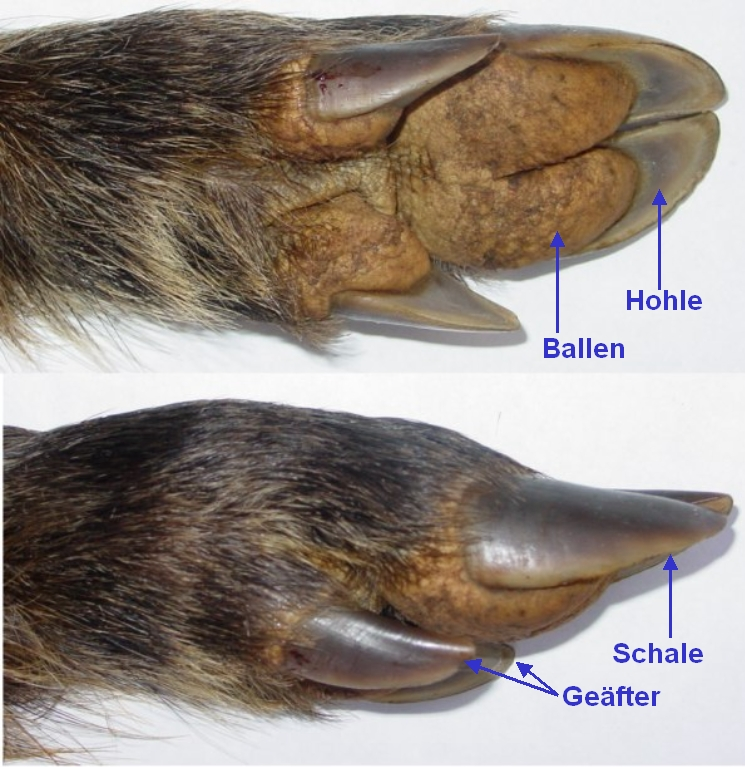
Hooves of a pig showing dewclaws

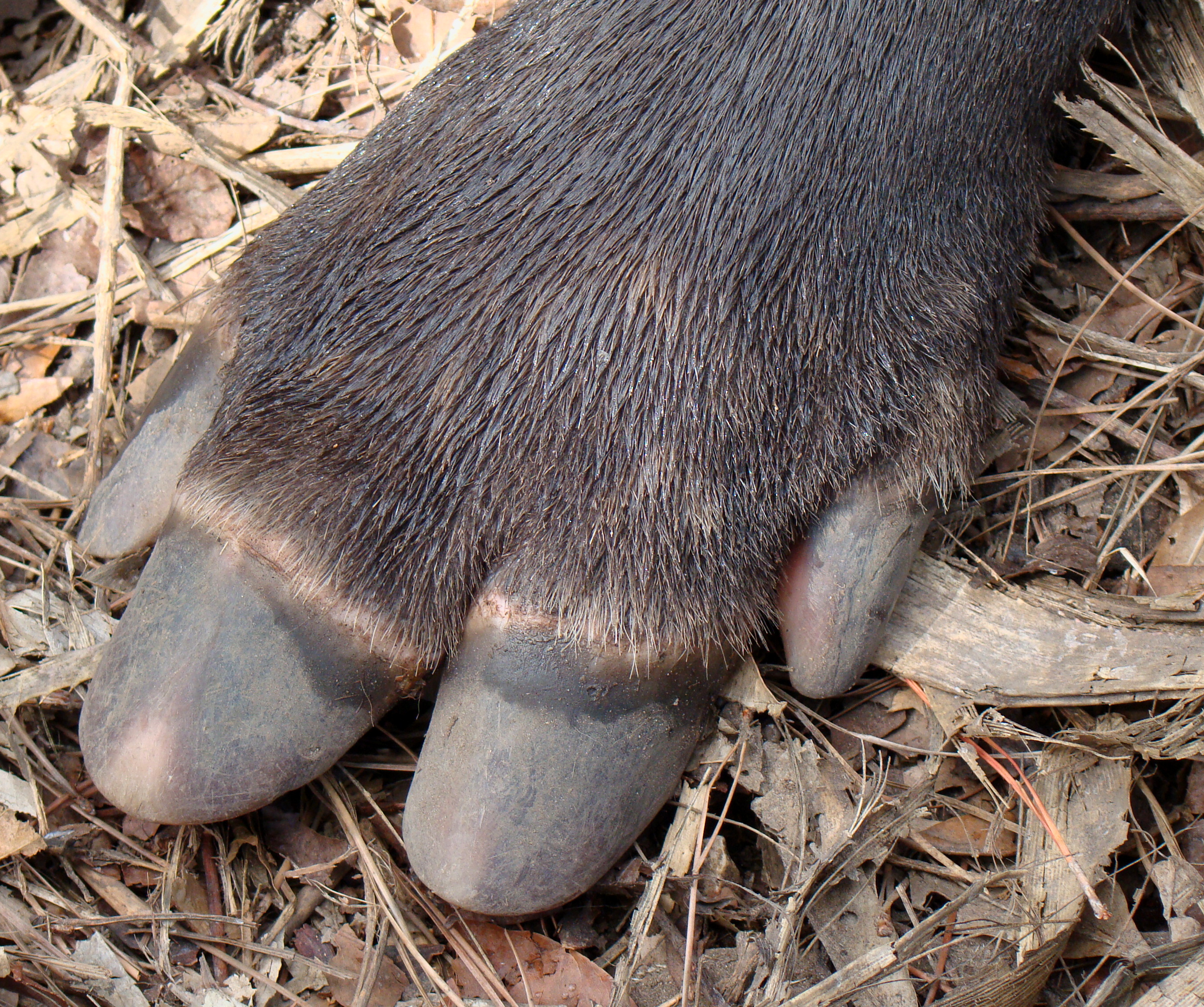
Cloven hooves of a tapir
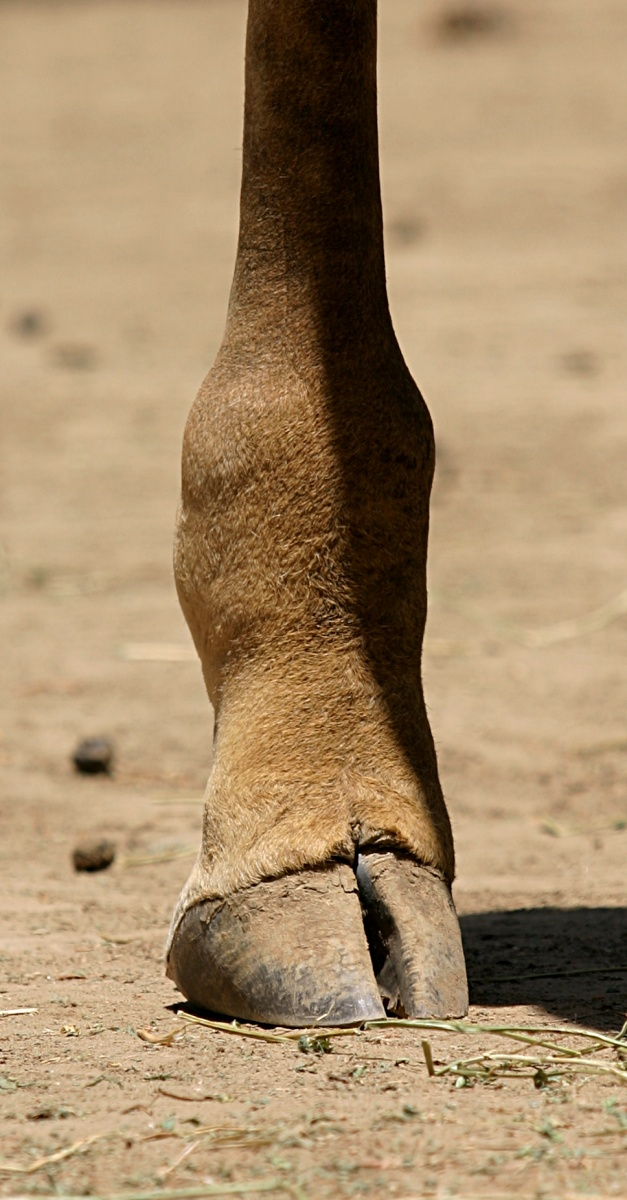
Rear foot of a giraffe (no dewclaws)

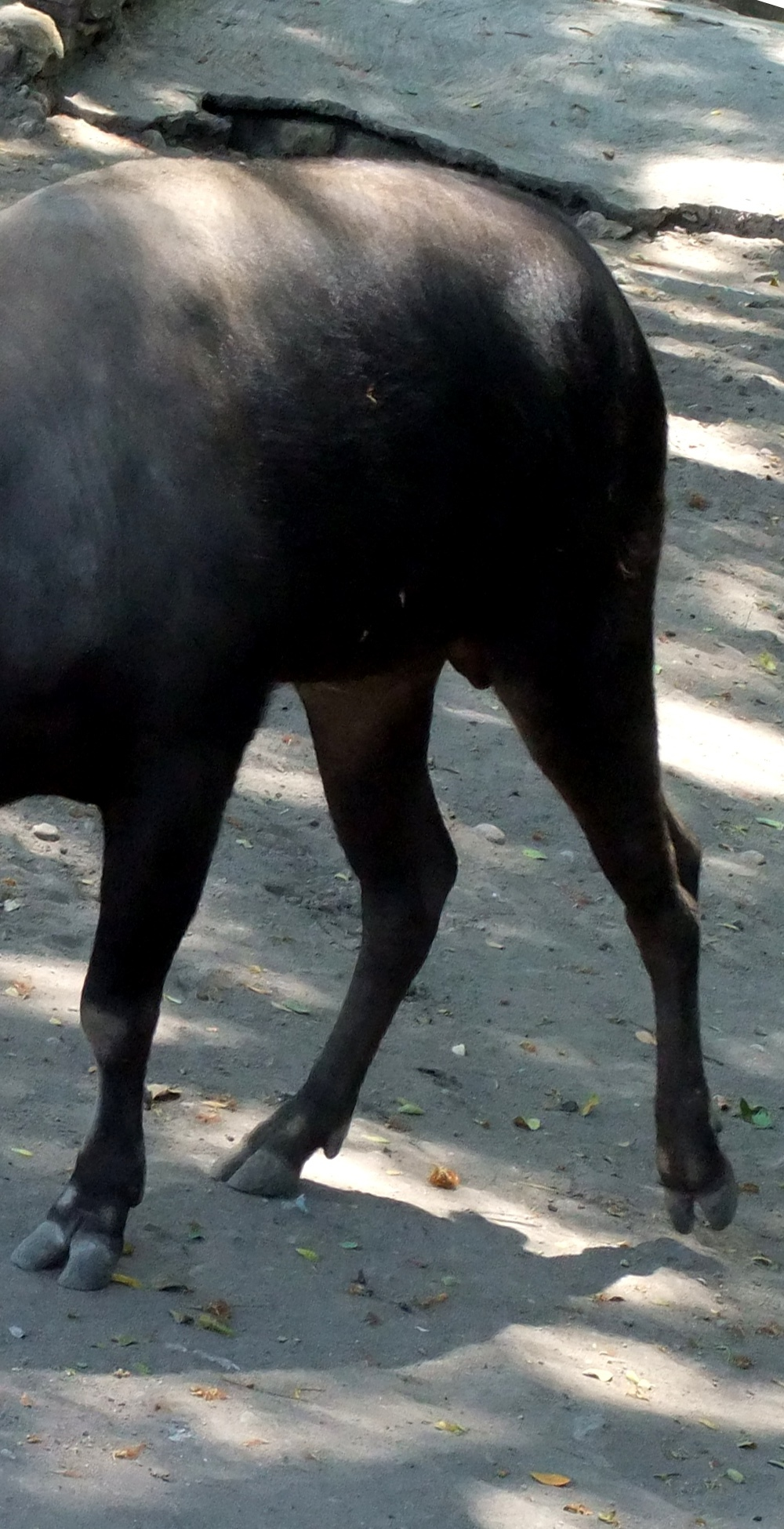
Cloven hooves of an anoa

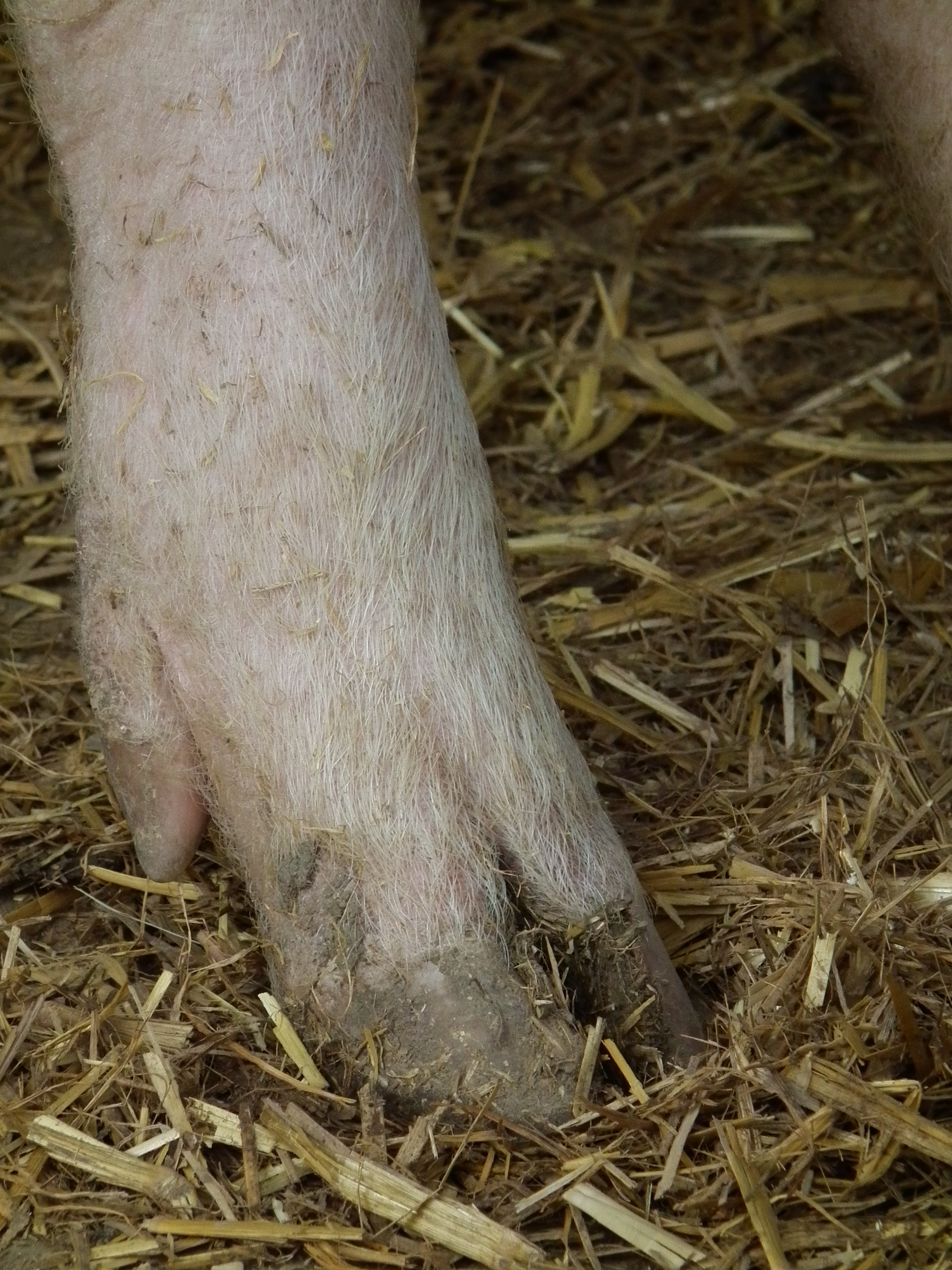
Pigs' hooves in soft ground

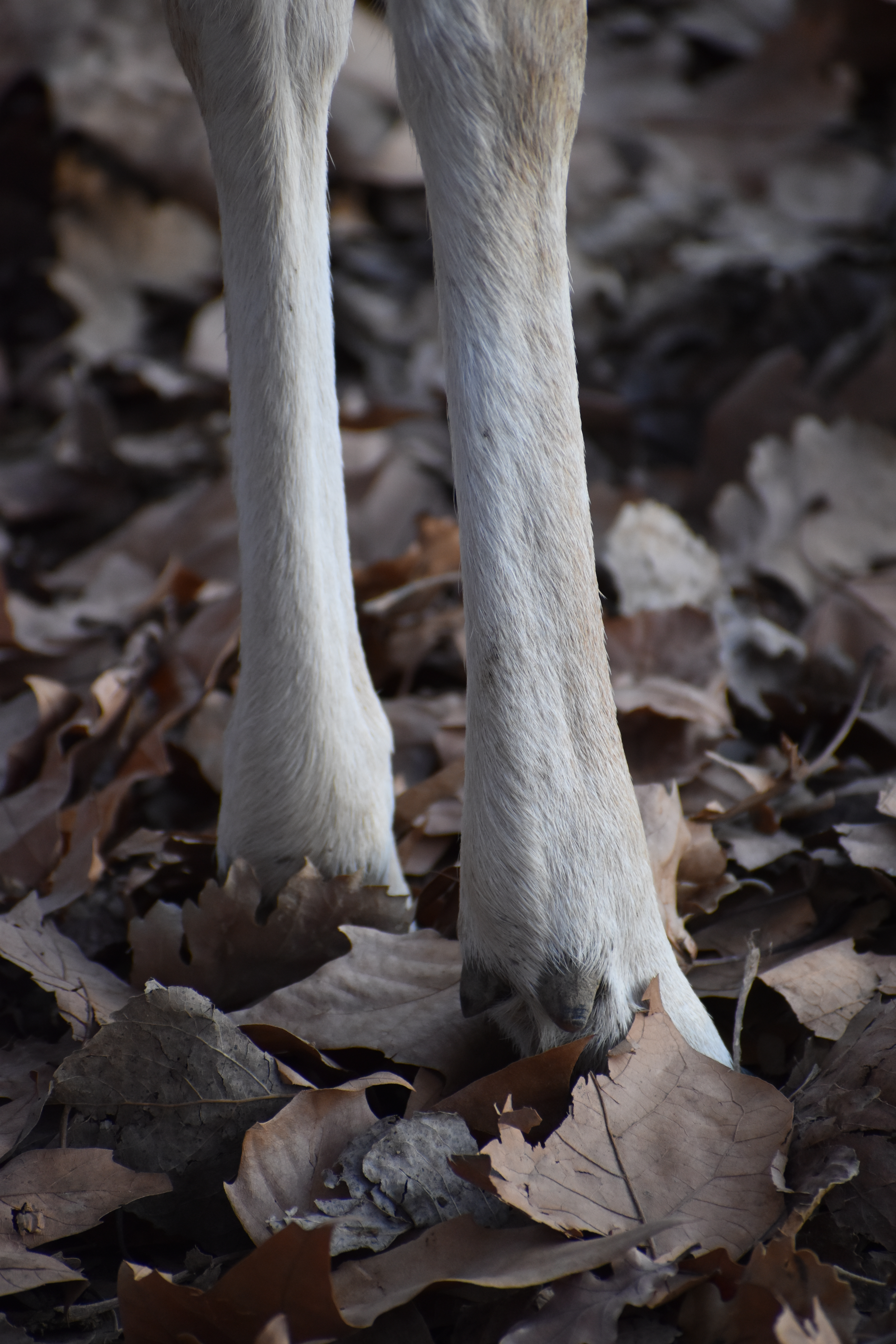
Hooves of a fallow deer showing dewclaws

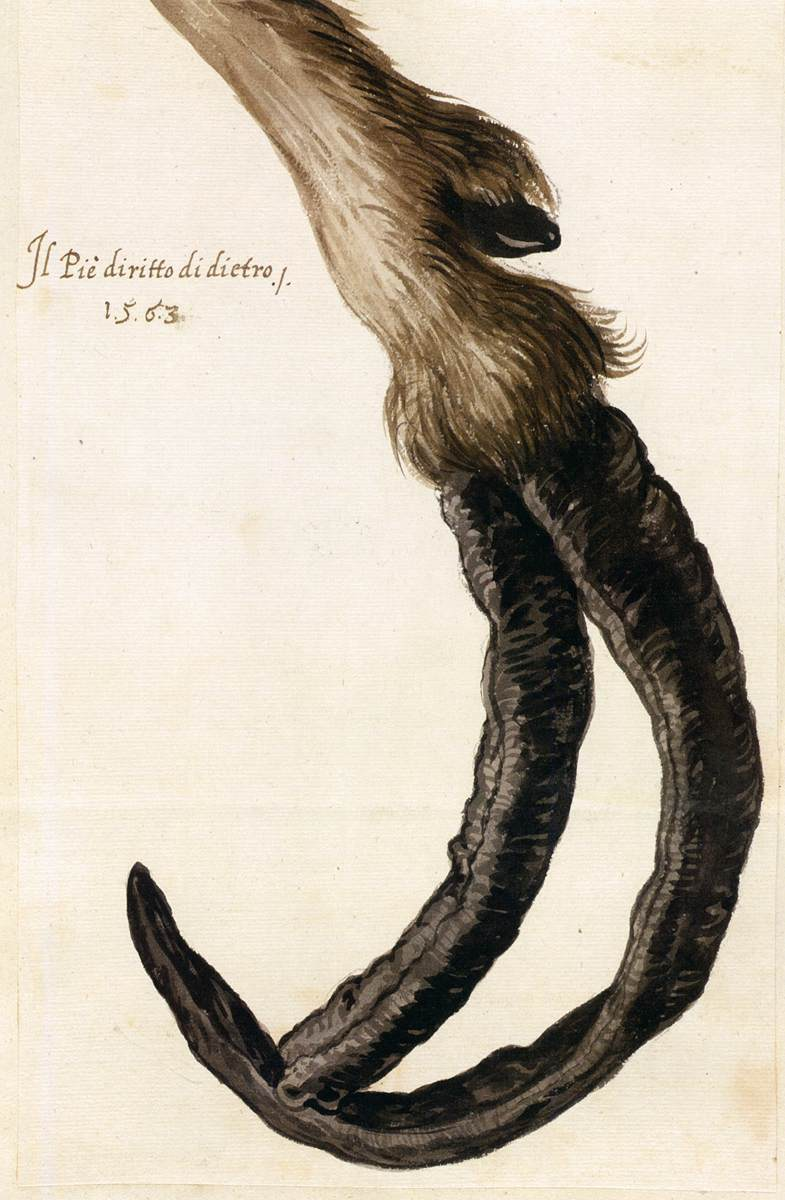
Deformed hoof of a domestic goat

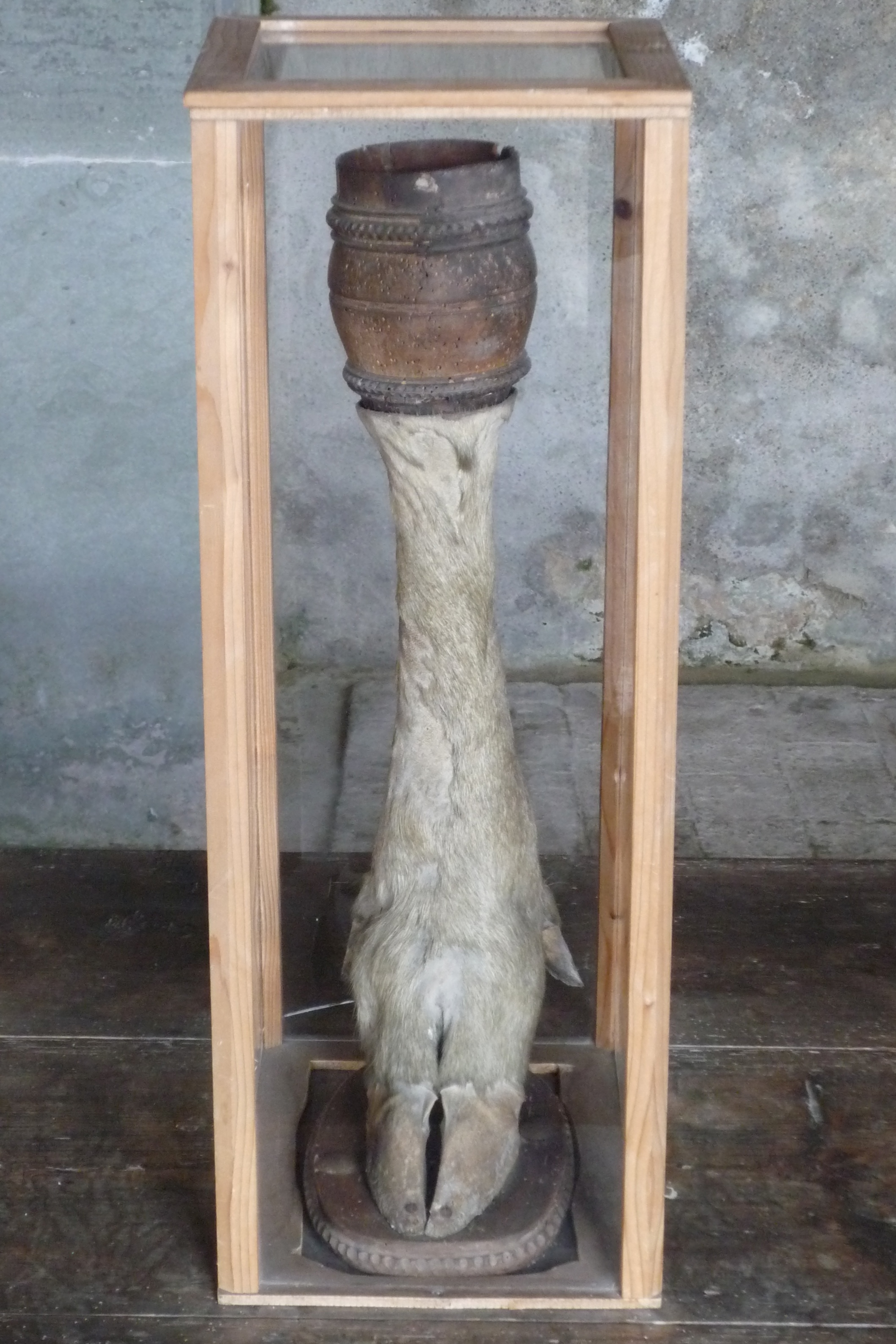
Moose hoof

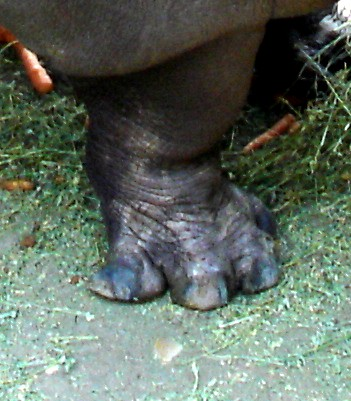
Hippopotamus hoof

== In culture ==
Hooves have historical significance in ceremonies and games. They have been used in burial ceremonies.

== See also ==
- Claw
- Horn (anatomy)
- Nail (anatomy)
