= Terry West =

African-American horsewoman and former jockey

Terry A. West (born ca. 1958) is an African-American equestrian from Maryland, former jockey and member of the state's Racing Commission. She is notable as one of the first black female jockeys in the United States to have a racing license. After retiring from racing, West continued in the horse industry as a competitor in hunter and jumper shows. In 2022, she was inducted into the Maryland Horse Show Association Hall of Fame.

== Biography ==
West grew up in Washington, DC. She began riding at age five, and her father was involved in horse showing and owned a farm in Howard County, Maryland. As a junior, she showed ponies and horses up the East Coast, as one of the few black equestrian competitors at events such as the Upperville Colt and Horse Show, the Devon Horse Show and the Washington International Horse Show.

=== Horse racing ===
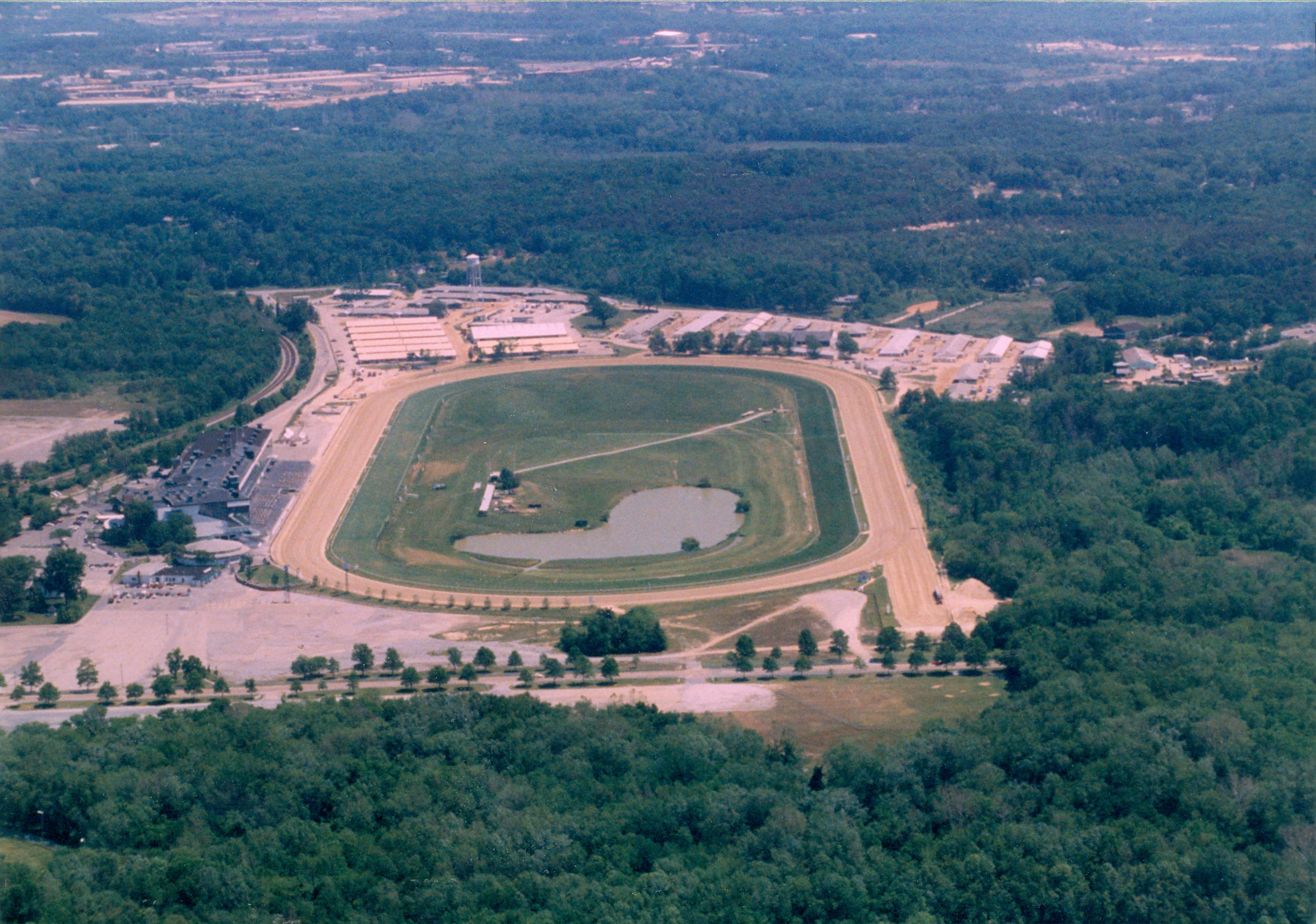
Maryland's Laurel Park Racecourse, the site of West's final professional race as a jockey.

In the 1970s, she began riding thoroughbreds as an exercise rider. In 1977, she became one of the first African-American female jockeys with a racing license in the United States. West's first race was on July 1, 1977 at Charles Town. Her first win came several months later on November 17, 1977 at the same track.

West's background as an African-American woman was a rarity on American racetracks. As a jockey, she described prejudice against female riders, recounting the difficulty it was to receive horses to ride. At the time, Maryland trainer King Leatherbury recounted the climate for female jockeys at the time when West was racing, "With all due respect to females, I’ve just never seen a female rider that’s as good, as strong, as aggressive as a male rider." Overall, West would ride as either a jockey or exercise rider for 27 years. West would spend 10 years as a professional jockey, eventually riding in 2018 races. Her final race took place at Laurel Park on June 20, 1987.

=== Later life ===
After retiring from racing, West became involved in the retraining of thoroughbreds and in the horse showing circuit, where she competes in hunters and jumpers. In 2017, West and her horse Truckin' Gold won Maryland's Dark Hollow Farm Open Hunter Classic.

In 2022, she was inducted into the Maryland Horse Show Association Hall of Fame, noted for her involvement of over fifty years in the Maryland horse industry.

In 2023, Maryland Governor Wes Moore appointed West as a Commissioner to the Maryland State Racing Commission. As commissioner, West is the current chair of the Maryland Bred Race Fund Advisory Committee.

West's granddaughter Kaitlyn Nicely-Harvey has followed in her grandmother's footsteps as a professional equestrienne, winning the 2019 Laura Pickett Award and 2018 MHSA Hunt Seat Medal.

== See also ==
- Cheryl White, the first African-American female horse racing jockey
- Kathryn Kusner, first female jockey in the United States
