= Interdigital necrobacillosis =

Hoof infection commonly found in sheep, goats, and cattle

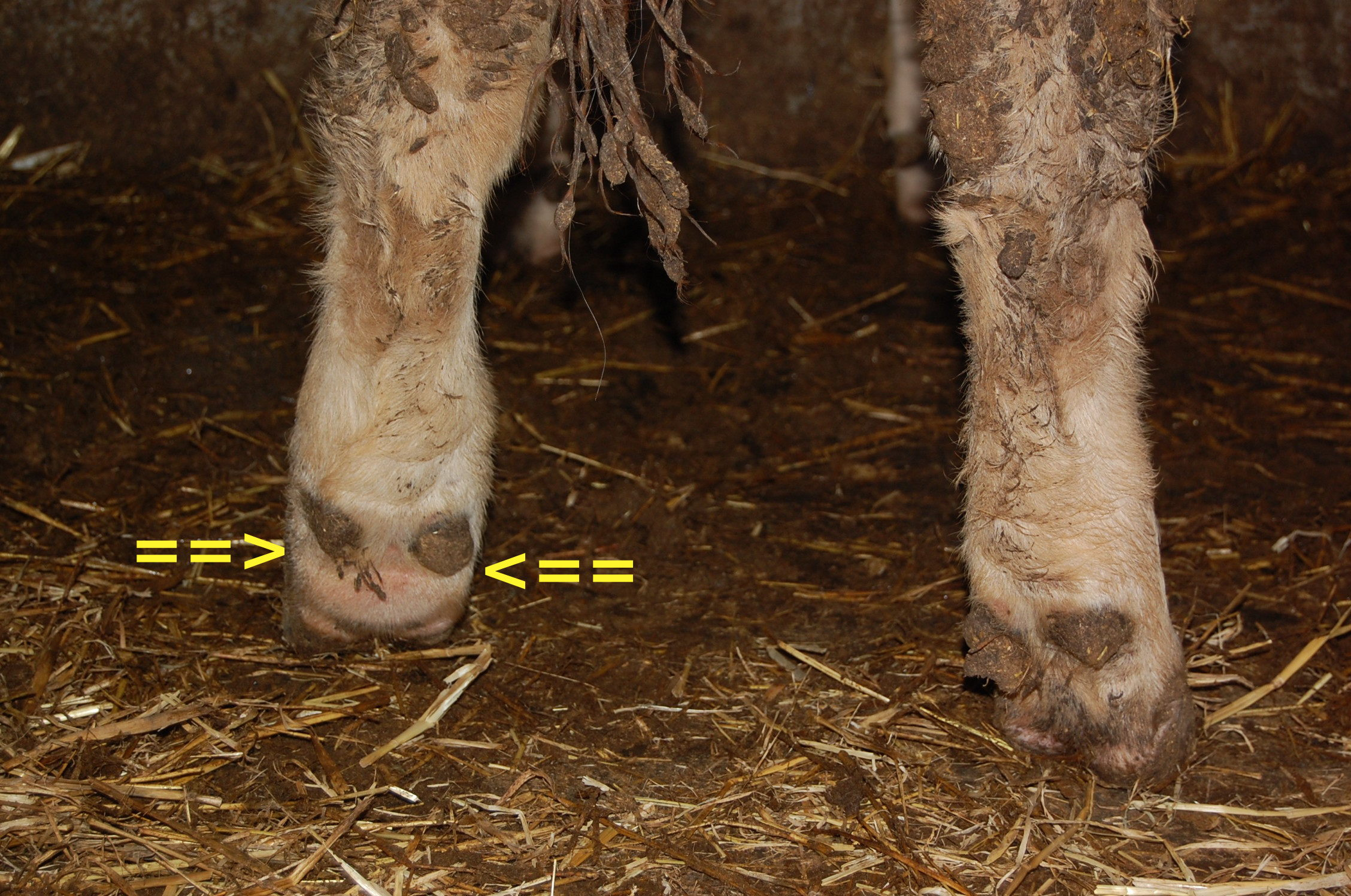
Interdigital Phlegmon (Phlegmona interdigitalis) in a steer; arrows show symmetrical enlargement of the digit

Interdigital necrobacillosis or Phlegmona interdigitalis or foot rot, also known as foul-in-the-foot, or infectious pododermatitis, is a hoof infection commonly found in sheep, goats, and cattle. As the name suggests, it rots away the foot of the animal, more specifically the area between the two toes of the affected animal. It is extremely painful and contagious. It can be treated with a series of medications, but if not treated, the whole herd can become infected. The cause of the infection in cattle is two species of anaerobic bacteria, Fusobacterium necrophorum and Prevotella melaninogenicus (formerly named Bacteroides melaninogenicus). Both bacteria are common to the environment in which cattle live, and Fusobacterium is present in the rumen and fecal matter of the cattle. In sheep, F. necrophorum first invades the interdigital skin following damage to the skin, and causes interdigital lesions and slight inflammation. The second stage of the disease is marked by the invasion of the foot by the foot rot bacterium Dichelobacter nodosus, a Gram-negative anaerobe. Usually, an injury to the skin between the hooves allows the bacteria to infect the animal. Another cause of foot rot may be high temperatures or humidity, causing the skin between the hooves to crack and let the bacteria infect the foot. This is one of the reasons foot rot is such a major problem in the summer. Foot rot is easily identifiable by its appearance and foul odor. Treatment is usually with an antibiotic medication, and preventing injury to the feet is the best way to prevent foot rot.

The disease is different in cattle and sheep and cross-infection is not thought to occur.

== Signs of infection ==
The first sign of a foot-rot infection is when the skin between the claws of the hoof begins to swell (cellulitis). Swelling usually appears 24 hours after infection. The skin between the toes may be very red and tender and the toes may separate because of all the swelling. This is very painful to the animal and can cause lameness. The animal may also have a raised body temperature. A crack can develop along the infected part and is yellow in color. The foot will have a foul odor. Tendons and joints in the area can become infected, which is much harder to treat. A condition known as "super foot rot" is seen in some animals. Super foot rot infection occurs much faster and is usually much more severe. Most normal foot rot treatments will not cure this foot rot and a veterinarian should be contacted immediately.

Vaccines have been developed, but their efficacy is questionable and the immunity they provide is of short duration.

== See also ==
- Footrot, for multiple uses of the term
- Trench foot
- Thrush (horse)
