= Maryland Racing Commission =

Governing body that oversees the horse racing in Maryland

The Maryland Racing Commission is the official governing body that oversees the horse racing and off-track betting in Maryland. Based in Towson, Maryland, it was formed on 1920. The commission is a division of the Maryland Department of Labor.

The commission operates under Title 11, Business Regulation, Annotated Code of Maryland, Horse Racing. and operated the following sub-committees; Maryland-Bred Race Fund Advisory Committee, Maryland Standardbred Race Fund Advisory Committee and the Maryland Jockey Injury Compensation Fund.

== History ==
In 1967 Kathryn Kusner applied for a jockey license through the commission but was denied because she was a woman. However, in 1968 Judge Ernest A. Loveless of the Circuit Court of Prince George's County ordered her to be granted the license. Kusner thus became the first licensed female jockey in the United States.

In 1992, the commission introduced off-track betting.

== Directors and Members ==
The current head of the racing commission is Bruce Quade.

The commission is required to have five board members without a financial interest and four members with a financial interest in racing who serve four year terms.

Mike Hopkins (Executive Director 2003–present) Bruce Quade (Director 2011-), Tom Winebrener, John Franzone, David Hayden, Charles Tildon, Ernest Grecco, Mary Louise Preis, Louis Ulman, John McDaniel, Bruce C. Spizler (Senior Assistant Attorney General)

- 2001 - Lewis J. Ulman (Director)
- Frank F. Favazza Jr.(-2010)
- Frank Small, Jr. (Chairman 1951–1952, member 1937–1950)
- Terry West, appointed 2023

== See also ==
- Maryland Horse Industry Board
- Laurel Park
- Pimlico Race Course
- Timonium Race Course
- Rosecroft Raceway
- Ocean Downs
