= American Horse Council =

- Formation: Organization 1969; 57 years ago, foundation 1991; 35 years ago
- Type: 501(c)(3) tax-exempt nonprofit
- Legal status: Active
- Purpose: Trade organization
- Headquarters: Washington, DC
- Region served: United States
- Fields: Horse industry
- Website: horsecouncil.org

The American Horse Council (AHC) is a trade organization in Washington, DC representing the horse industry. The organization formed in the late 1960s, and received IRS 501(c) non-profit recognition in 1969, with a committee that became the Coalition of State Horse Councils forming in 1970, now having 43 states participating. American Horse Council Foundation was founded in 1991. It lobbies before Congress and Federal agencies for the interests of the horse industry, and serves as a unified voice for the horse industry.

Membership is open to anyone, but is primarily made up of the following groups:

- Horse Councils of individual states;
- breed organizations;
- horse breeders;
- farriers;
- veterinarians;
- horse owners;
- rodeos;
- race tracks;
- horse industry businesses;
- individuals.

A subcommittee of the American Horse Council, the State Horse Councils Advisory Committee (SHCAC), is made up of representatives of the individual state horse councils, and works on equine issues at the state level, dealing with state legislation, trails & show facilities, state horse expos, etc.

== Van Ness Award ==
This committee annually presents the Van Ness Award, given in honor and memory of Marjorie Van Ness of New Jersey, a long-time leader and friend to the entire horse industry. This award is presented to an individual that best emulates the dedication and commitment of Marge Van Ness to the improvement of the horse industry at the state level. Past recipients have been:

Van Ness Award Winners
1990	:	Richard Woolam of Connecticut
1991	:	Glenn T. Petty of North Carolina
1992	:	the Indiana Horse Council
1993	:	Bobbi Lipka of New York
1994	:	Lt. Col. James Marsh of New Jersey
1995	:	Ruby Holmquist of Illinois
1996	:	Jim Real of California
1997	:	Connie Diedrichs-Kimbrel of Colorado
1998	:	Valerie Cole of New Mexico
1999	:	Lisa Derby Oden of New Hampshire
2000	:	Robert Mowrey of North Carolina
2001	:	Karyn Malinowski of New Jersey
2002	:	Jerry Walker of Indiana
2003	:	Diane Jones of New York
2004	:	Neil Shaw of Ohio
2005	:	David Petrie of Wisconsin
2006	:	Glen Eaton of Minnesota
2007	:	Jane Gilbert of New Jersey
2008	:	Eldon G. Reyer of New Mexico
2009	:	Sally Blount of Iowa
2010	:	Crystal Brumme-Kimball of Maryland
2011	:	Edith Stanger of Idaho
2012	:	Madelyn Millard of Kentucky
2013	:	Beverly Raymond of Maryland
2014	:	Paul Briney of Illinois
2015	:	Yvette Anderson-Rollins of Indiana
2016	:	Ann Swinker of University Park, Pennsylvania
2017	:	Jill Montgomery of Pueblo West, Colorado
2018	:	Tim Capps, formerly of Louisville, Kentucky
2019	:	Jean Ligon, of the Michigan Horse Council
2020	:	Fred Sarver, of Carlisle, Kentucky
2022	:	Lonny Powell, of the Florida Thoroughbred Breeders' and Owners' Association
2023	:	Chelsie Huseman, Texas A&M University
2024	:	Bud & Gwen Wills, of the Pennsylvania Equine Council
2025	:	Sarah Coleman, of the Kentucky Horse Council
2026	:	Justine Staten, of the Kansas Horse Council and Chair of the Coalition of State Horse Councils
