= Cheryl White (jockey) =

American horse racing jockey (1953–2019)

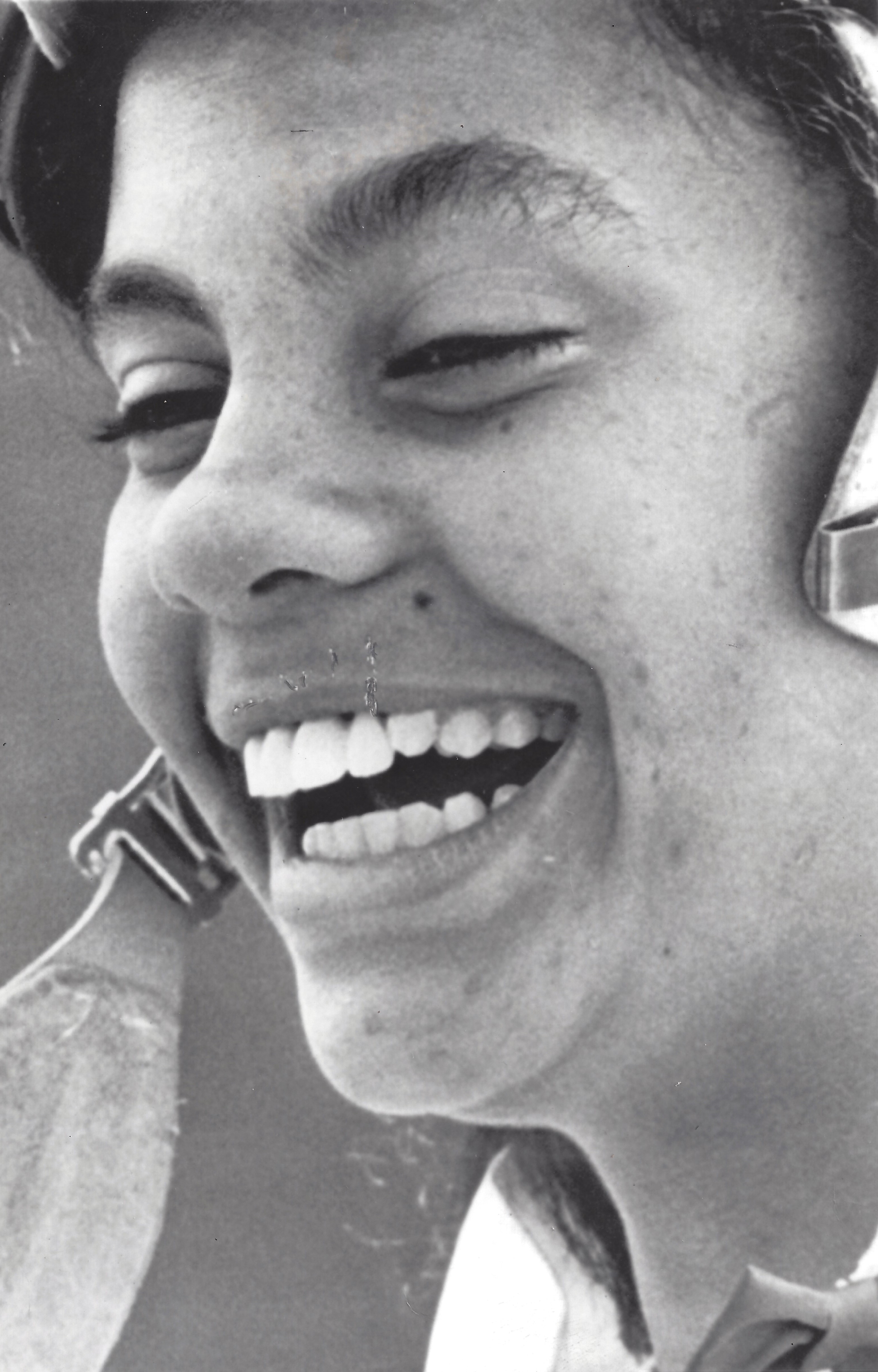
- White in 1971

Personal information
- Born: October 29, 1953 Cleveland, Ohio
- Died: September 20, 2019 (aged 65) Youngstown, Ohio
- Occupations: Jockey, racetrack official

Horse racing career
- Sport: Horse racing
- Career wins: 226 (Thoroughbred racing)

Honors
- Appaloosa Hall of Fame (2011)

Cheryl White (October 29, 1953 — September 20, 2019) was the first African American female horse racing jockey and the first woman to serve as a California horse racing steward.

== Debut ==
Licensed to ride at Thistledown in North Randall, Ohio, when she was 17 years old, White began her career riding for her father, trainer Raymond White, in June 1971. She finished 11th in her first race, on a filly named Ace Reward.

White earned her first win as a jockey on September 3, 1971, riding Jetolara to victory at Waterford Park (now Mountaineer Park) in Chester, West Virginia.

White's debut on track garnered significant attention. National newspapers covered her first start as a jockey, and she appeared on the cover of the July 29, 1971, issue of Jet Magazine.

== Career ==
White is credited with 226 wins and earnings of $762,624 in Thoroughbred racing, but her career also included Quarter Horse, Arabian, Paint, and Appaloosa racing. In total, White estimates that she won about 750 races. As a Thoroughbred rider, White became the first woman to win two races on the same day in two states in 1971 when she rode a winner at Thistledown and then at Waterford. She was also the first female jockey to win five races in one day, accomplishing that feat on October 19, 1983, at Fresno Fair.

As an Appaloosa rider, White was the first woman to win the Appaloosa Horse Club's Jockey of the Year award, scoring the title in 1977, and then again in 1983, 1984, and 1985. She was inducted into the Appaloosa Hall of Fame in 2011.

After passing the California Horse Racing Board's Steward Examination in 1991, White retired from riding in 1992 to become a racing official. She returned to the saddle for appearances in the Lady Legends for the Cure event held by Pimlico Race Course from 2010 to 2014. Her final ride was aboard Macho Spaces at Pimlico in 2014.

== Death and legacy ==
Born in Cleveland, Ohio, White died on September 20, 2019, at the age of 65, in Youngstown, Ohio. "Cheryl was never a great self-promoter, and wasn't concerned with the politics of racing,” her brother, Raymond White Jr., said in a press release announcing her death. "She just did her thing. She didn't understand what she had accomplished. I don't know that she understood her significance, or place in history."

== See also ==
- Terry West, another pioneering African American female jockey who followed in White's footsteps
