= Maryland Horse Industry Board =

Part of the Maryland Department of Agriculture

The Maryland Horse Industry Board (MHIB) is an agency which is part of the Maryland Department of Agriculture in the United States. The MHIB, originally the State Board of Inspection of Horse Riding Stables, was established by Maryland statute in 1968. It was made part of the Department of Licensing and Regulation in 1970. The Board transferred to the Department of Agriculture in 1980. In October 1998 the duties and name of the MHIB were altered. The change resulted from a statutory change lobbied for by the Maryland Horse Council, a member organization of the American Horse Council. The duties of the MHIB expanded beyond stable licensing to include: - promoting the use and development of horses in Maryland; - support research related to equine health and related issues; - creating public awareness of the value of equine activities as they relate to the green space preservation; - developing and disseminating information concerning the equine industry; and - advising the Department of Agriculture regarding matters affecting the horse industry in the State.

There are 12 members of the MHIB, including the Secretary of the Maryland Department of Agriculture, appointed by the Governor. Those members serve four year terms and represent specific sectors or organizations of the horse industry. Those sectors or organizations include: - Trade and Support Businesses; - Officers of County Humane Societies; - Trails and Recreational Riding; - Organized Competitions and Shows; - Thoroughbreds; - Standardbreds; - Academic Equine Community; - Licensed Veterinarians; - Maryland Horse Council; - Licensed Stable Operators; and - The General Public.

The Chairman of the MHIB is elected annually by the Board. Since 1998 the chairmen of the MHIB have included:

- Gregory Gingery (1998-2004) - James B. Steele (2004–present)

The MHIB employs a staff at its discretion. The Executive Director position is currently staffed by Ross Peddicord; it was previously staffed from 2003 - 2010 by J. Robert "Rob" Burk, the Stable Inspectors are Pegeen Morgan and Keziah "Kezie" Richard and the part-time Administrative Assistant is Tonya Jones.

The MHIB has overseen several high-profile projects for the horse industry in Maryland including the Maryland Equine Census, the Maryland Horse Park project, the Mid-Atlantic International Import and Export Equine Center, and the Maryland Horse Forum. Additionally, in order to fulfill its entire mission since 1999 the MHIB has awarded grants to non-profit and not-for-profit projects benefiting the Maryland horse industry. In 2003, it awarded a $5,000 grant to the Marion duPont Scott Equine Medical Center, part of the Virginia-Maryland Regional College of Veterinary Medicine.
