= Footrot =

Footrot (foot rot) in ruminants refers to various pathological conditions.

== In sheep ==
In sheep, contagious footrot (also hoof rot) is a universally distributed disease (affecting accessorily goats) characterized by chronic contagious epidermatitis of feet, especially in the fore limbs, caused by two anaerobic bacteria, not transferable to bovines.

Next to that contagious condition, there exist a benign footrot with similar lesions in the interdigital skin, but slighter underrunning of the adjacent horn. The disease only occurs in individual sheep.

== In cattle ==
In cattle, the term may cover different conditions.

The terminomogy has been very confusing, and several entities probably exist under such names as footrot (USA) Panaritium (Germany) or panaris (France). The author strongly recommend adoption of the [...] definition "interdigital necrobacillosis" (for "Phlegmona interdigitalis").

The following digital diseases of cattle might have been called "footrot":

- Interdigital necrobacillosis: an acute severe phlegmon of interdigital connective tissue, especially in the rear limbs. It is the most frequent disease associated with the word "footrot" in cattle.
- Interdigital dermatitis, also called "scald": an acute or chronic inflammation of the interdigital skin, without extension to the subcutaneous tissue. Treatment and prevention is based on formalin or copper sulfate foot-bath.
- Interdigital skin hyperplasia: excess of epidermal and hypodermal tissue occupying part of all of interdigital space, especially dorsally in the fore limbs.
- Pododermatitis circumscripta: specific profiferative lesion of the sole-bulb junction, near the axial margin (rear limbs).
- Distal interphalangeal arthritis or septic arthritis of the interphalangeal joint: purulent inflammation of the distal phalangeal joint, often a complication of one of the above cited conditions, especially in the rear limbs.
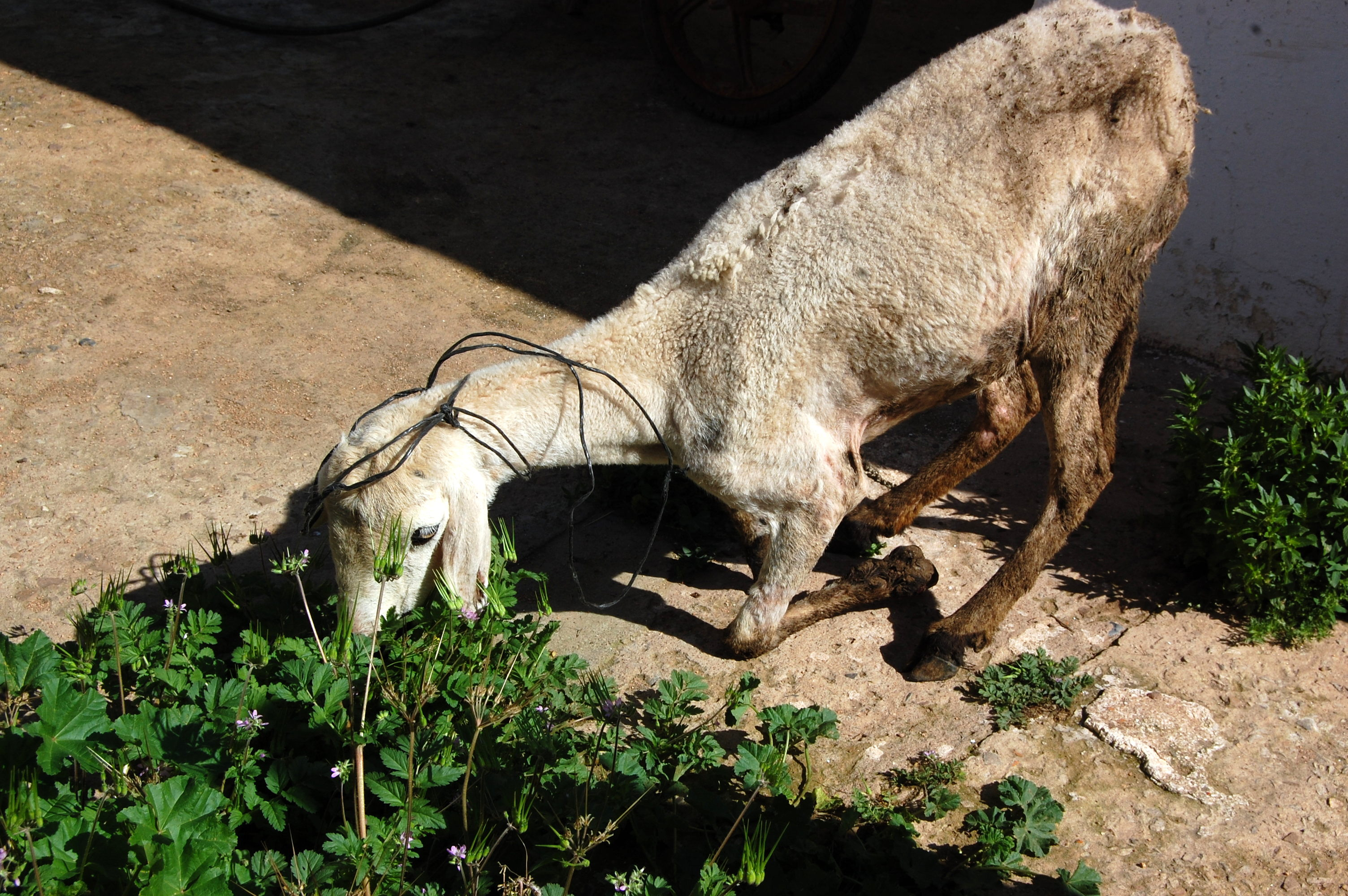
knee-walking in ovine footrot (benign form)

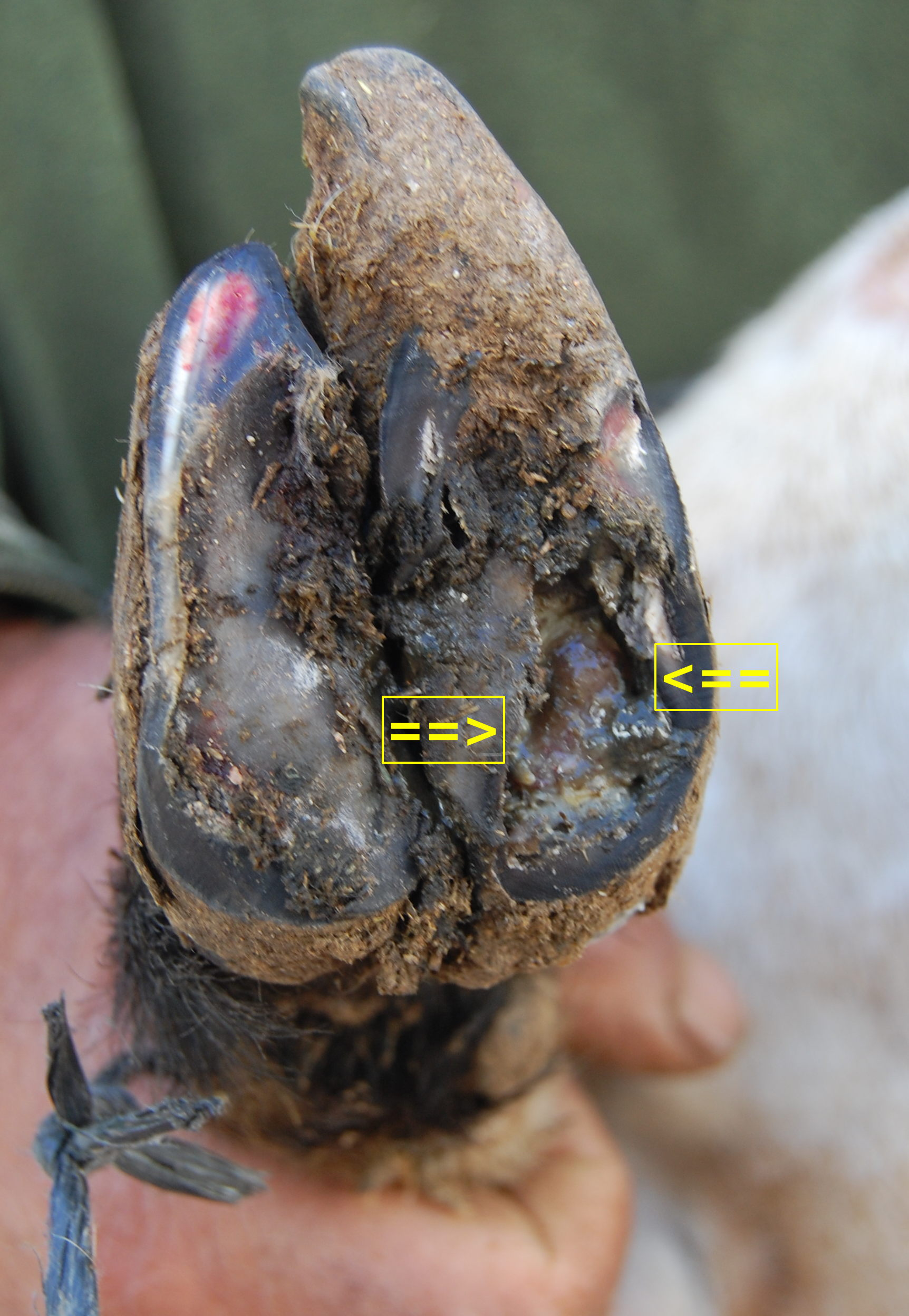
partially trimmed hooves of an affected ewe

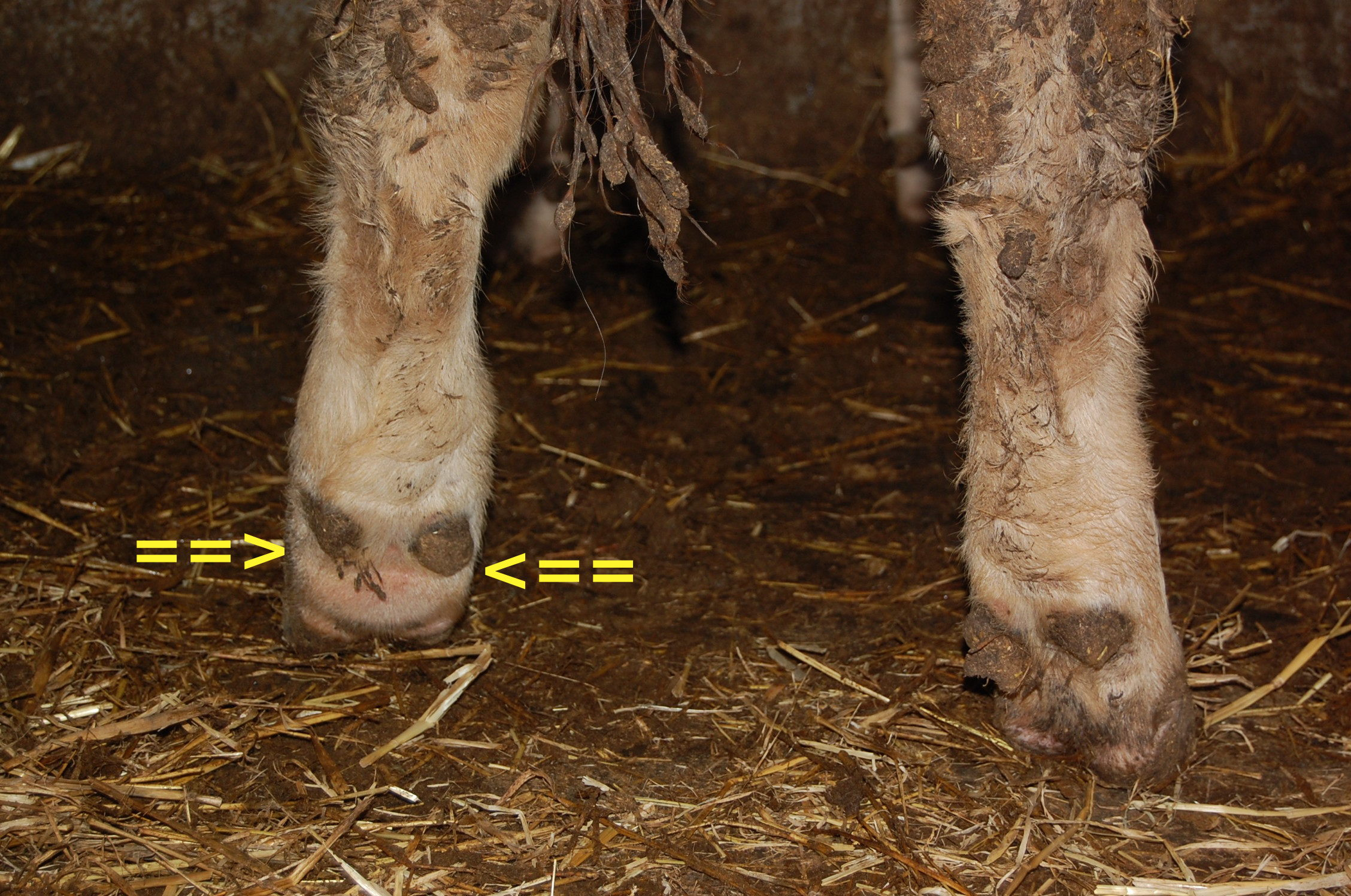
interdigital phlegmon in a steer

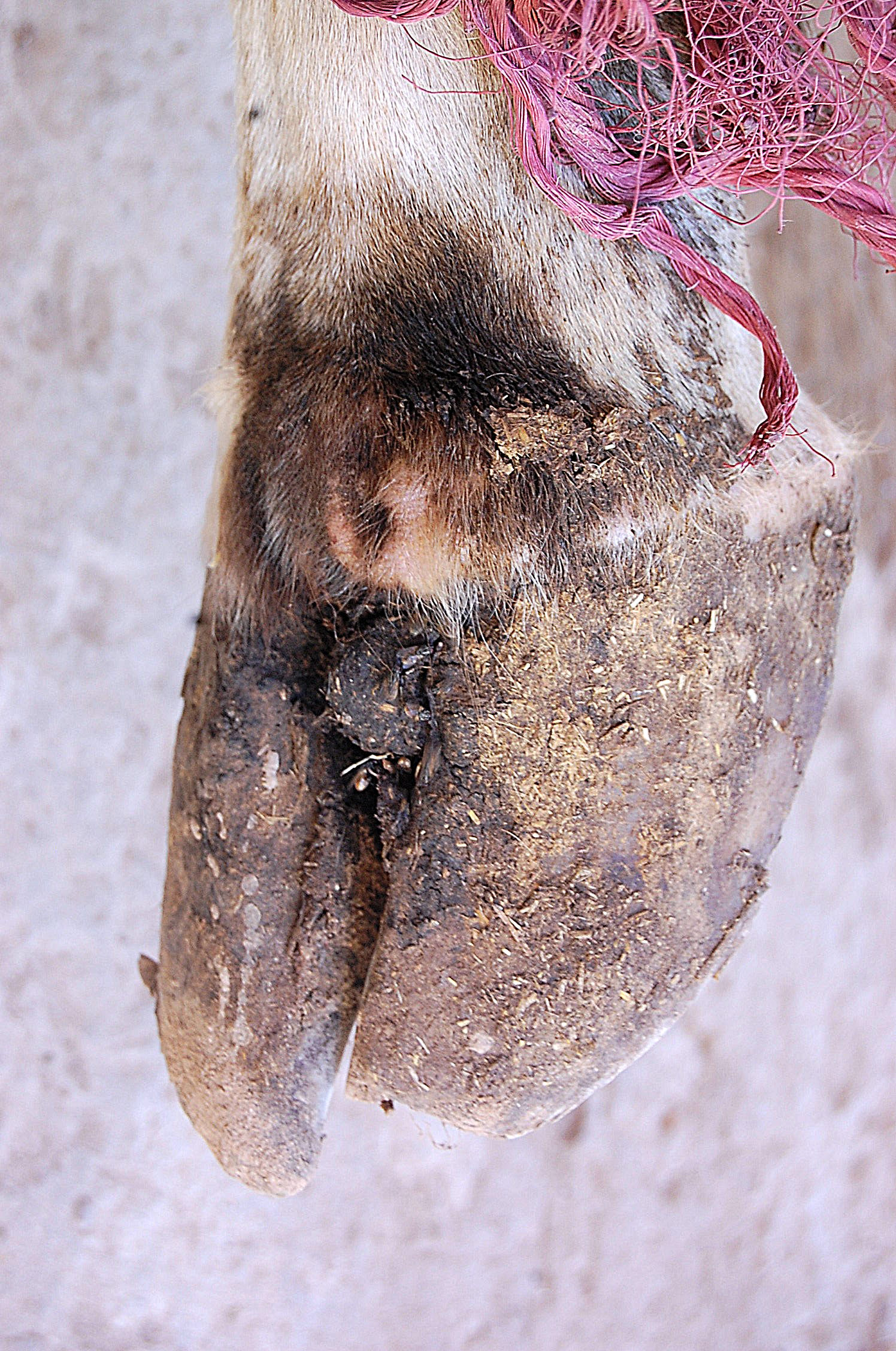
Interdigital skin hyperplasia

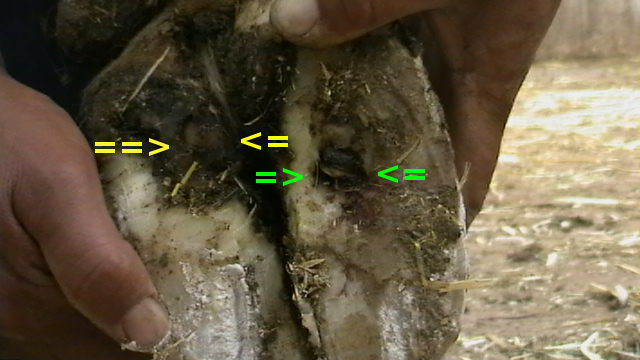
Pododermatitis circumscripta (on both claws)

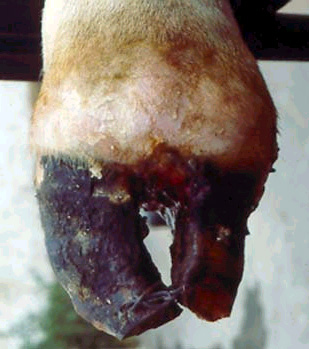
distal interphalangeal arthritis

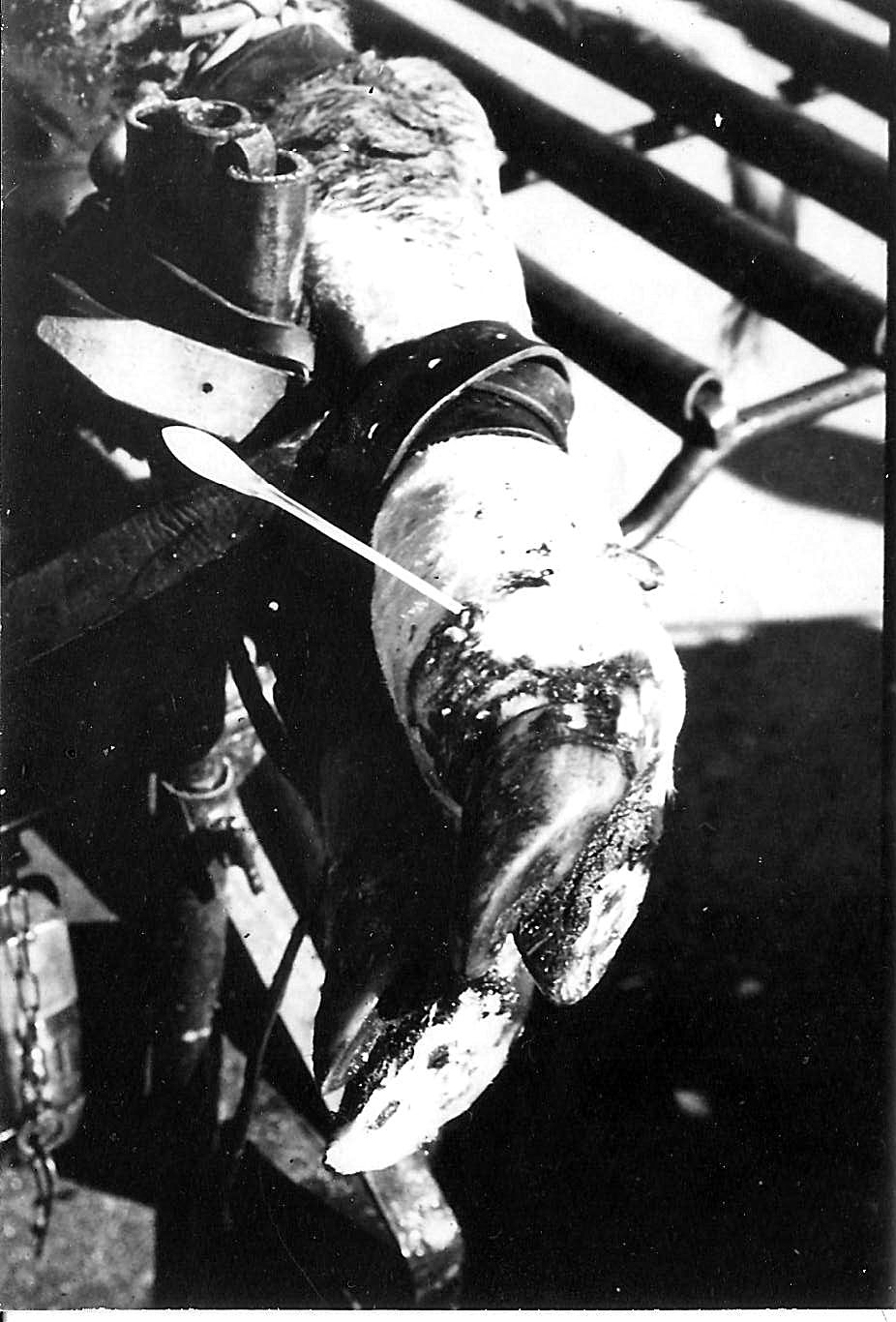
fistula from distal interphalangeal joint (probe)
