= Kathryn Kusner =

American equestrian (born 1940)

Kathy Kusner
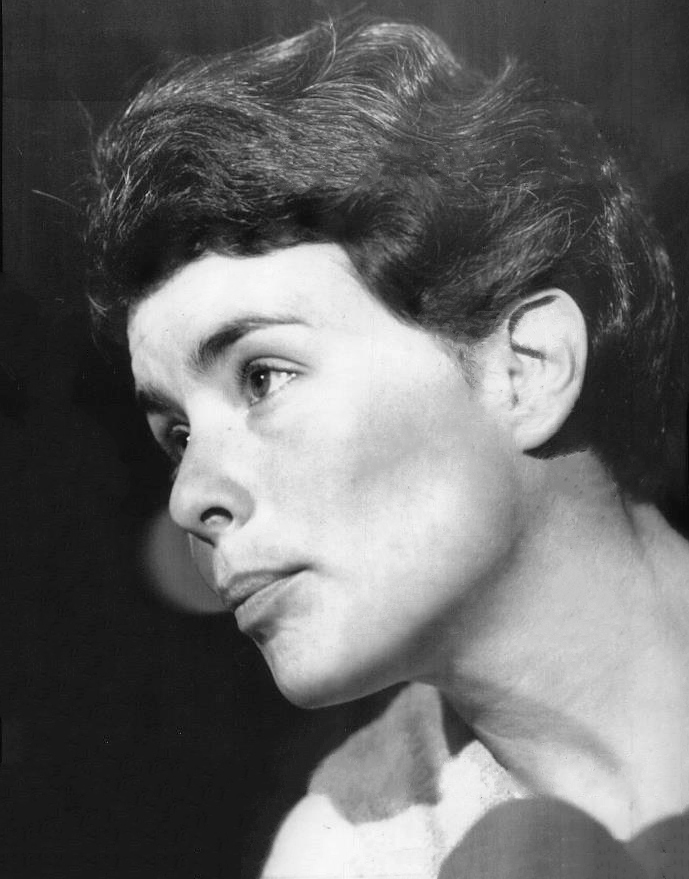
- Kusner in 1968

Personal information
- Full name: Kathryn Hallowell "Kathy" Kusner
- Citizenship: USA
- Born: March 21, 1940 (age 86)
- Height: 4 ft 11.5 in (151.1 cm)
- Weight: 99 lb (45 kg) (1968)
- Website: www.kathykusner.com

Sport
- Sport: Equestrian

Achievements and titles
- Olympic finals: 1964, 1968, 1972
Medal record
Representing the United States
Olympic Games
Silver medal – second place	1972 Munich	Team jumping
Pan American Games
Gold medal – first place	1963 Sao Paulo	Team jumping
Silver medal – second place	1967 Winnipeg	Team jumping

Kathryn Hallowell "Kathy" Kusner (born March 21, 1940) is an American equestrian and Olympic medalist in show jumping. She was one of the first women to ride for the United States Equestrian Team (USET), the first licensed female jockey, and the first American woman to win an Olympic medal in equestrian competition.

== Early life ==
Kathryn "Kathy" Kusner was born in Gainesville, Florida, on March 21, 1940. Her mother was a teacher; her father was a mathematics professor at University of Florida and later a Lt. Colonel in the Air Force. She grew up with a natural affinity for horses, searching for them in fields throughout her childhood days. When she first saw a horse show, she immediately knew that she wanted to ride horses for the rest of her life. However, because she did not come from a well-connected or wealthy family, she could not buy her own horse. Instead, Kusner spent her time working at the stables for $2 an afternoon. More importantly though, Kusner could ride horses and take lessons. Her riding and jumping skills quickly grew, and soon Kusner was being noticed by horse dealers. She spent much of her high school years completely immersed in the world of horses, riding and performing in shows and ring events as well as showing horses for horse dealers. Although she began by riding "their most raggedy rough horses," getting any and every experience she could, she rose to ride better horses, even riding the best jumper in the United States at the time. Since the age of 16, Kusner also participated in unrecognized Steepleflat and timber races, both types of Steeplechase racing, where she often won.

== Equestrian career ==
In 1958, when Kusner was 18, she was invited to the United States Equestrian Team trials. Two years later, she was named "Horsewoman of the Year" by the American Horse Shows Association. In 1961 at age 21, Kusner officially joined the United States Equestrian Team as the first woman member in 10 years. She helped win a team gold medal for the 1963 Pan-Am Games in San Paulo and represented the United States in the 1964 Olympic Games in Tokyo. In 1967, she brought a team silver medal at the Pan-Am Games in Winnipeg and in 1968, she represented the United States for the Olympics in Mexico.

1967 also marked the year when Kusner applied for a jockey license through the Maryland Racing Commission but was denied because she was a woman. In an interview with Makers, Kusner noted that "I never, ever thought about being a woman until it was time to get a jock's license." At this time, Kusner was an internationally acclaimed equestrian but could not legally compete in American races without a jockey license. Kusner and her lawyer took her case to court, and in 1968 Judge Ernest A. Loveless of the Circuit Court of Prince George's County ordered her to be granted the license. Kusner thus became the first licensed female jockey in the United States in October 1968.

After taking time off in 1969 from a broken leg, Kusner won a silver medal in the 1972 Munich Olympics and became the first American woman to win an Olympic medal in equestrian competition. Now a licensed jockey, she competed in races from Canada to Mexico, Germany, Colombia, Chile, Peru, Panama, South Africa, and what was then Rhodesia. She was also the first woman to ride in the Maryland Hunt Cup, the toughest timber race in the world. In 1990, Kusner was inducted into United States Show Jumping Hall of Fame. In 2021, she was inducted into the National Cowgirl Museum and Hall of Fame.

== Horses in the Hood ==
In 1990, Kusner founded the organization, Horses in the Hood (HHLA), which brought at-risk inner-city children in the Los Angeles area to a five-day horse and riding camp. By the end of October 2014, it was recorded that over 928 at risk children and adults have taken part in 91 horse camps through HHLA. The camps allowed children to work with horses and develop emotional and personal bonds through learning the care and riding of horses.

== Later life ==
Although Kusner no longer competes, she continues to leave her legacy as a renowned equestrian by giving riding clinics all over the world. Beyond the show ring, she has worked as an expert witness concerning horse-related issues since 1983, a course designer both nationally and internationally, a television commentator for Grand Prix show jumping events and a writer for well-known equestrian journals. Her impact and work has had her featured in a variety of television shows, books, articles and a 2005 Library of Congress publication, Women Who Dare. She was even featured in the Disney movie, The Horse in the Grey Flannel Suit, for long riding shots.

Outside of the horse world, Kusner is a licensed pilot with commercial, multi-engine, instrument, seaplane, and commercial glider ratings. She obtained a Lear Jet-type rating, for the Lear 23 and 24, and became the first woman to work as a Lear Jet pilot for Executive Jet Aviation, which was the largest jet charter company in the world at that time.

She is also a skilled flying acrobat, an experienced scuba, and an active marathon runner. She has completed 122 marathons as of September 2014 and 73 ultramarathons, including 20 races of 50 miles or longer.
