= Horse industry =

Economic activity associated with horses

The horse industry, or equine industry, is the economic activity associated with horses. This includes core agribusiness activities related to the use, possession or ownership of horses, as well as leisure activities and related economic activity that provides associated goods and services.

Businesses directly or indirectly related to horses include equine nutrition, equipment, publications, veterinary care, education, and sports clothing. In the U.S., about 6 percent of veterinarians specialize in horse care, within the larger field of large animal veterinary care.

== Economic impact ==
A 2009 survey conducted by American Horse Publications found that the horse industry had an economic impact of about 300 billion dollars, based upon a US horse population of four million animals, and it generated 1.6 million full-time jobs. Two previous studies were completed in 1996 and 2005. The 2005 study determined there were 9.2 million horses in the United States, a plurality of which were used for recreational purposes. That study identified a direct economic impact of $39 billion and combined direct and indirect spending having an economic impact of $102 billion, supporting 1.4 million full-time jobs. Texas, California and Florida had the most horses, but the study also found a horse population of at least 20,000 animals in each of 45 of the 50 states. Though other states have higher horse populations and more farms, the Equine industry in Kentucky led the nation in 2009 for total sales and the highest market value of "equine products."

== Law and lobbying ==
In the United States, some animals in the horse industry are protected by the Horse Protection Act of 1970, which prohibits certain forms of animal abuse. U.S. state laws governing the industry are "uneven" with horses being sometimes treated as livestock, sometimes pets, with widely varying requirements. In many U.S. states, landowners are protected by statute from liability lawsuits resulting from injuries caused by horses and mules. Trade associations such as National Thoroughbred Racing Association and the American Horse Council lobby lawmakers for favorable outcomes for the industry.
