= Equestrian at the 1972 Summer Olympics – Team jumping =

Team jumping at the Games of the XX Olympiad
- Venue: Olympic Stadium
- Date: 11 September 1972
- Competitors: 17 team of 4 (68 total) from 17 nations

Medalists
1st place, gold medalist(s)		Fritz Ligges; Gerhard Wiltfang; Hartwig Steenken; Hans Günter Winkler	West Germany
2nd place, silver medalist(s)		William Steinkraus; Neal Shapiro; Kathyrn Kusner; Frank Chapot	United States
3rd place, bronze medalist(s)		Vittorio Orlandi; Raimondo D'Inzeo; Graziano Mancinelli; Piero D'Inzeo	Italy

The team jumping in equestrian at the 1972 Olympic Games in Munich was held at Olympic Stadium on 11 September.

== Competition format ==
The team show jumping event consisted of two rounds, held separately from the individual competition. The top 8 teams from the first round qualified for the second round. Each rider on the team rides the course the rider with the most faults, score is thrown out, the remaining score are added up to determine the total points. This was repeated in the second round, both rounds were then added together to determine placement, if tied a jump-off between all tied teams would determine the winners.

== Results ==
Rank	Riders	Nation	Horses	1st round faults	Total	2nd round faults	Total	Overall faults
1st place, gold medalist(s)	Fritz Ligges; Gerhard Wiltfang; Hartwig Steenken; Hans Günter Winkler	West Germany	Robin; Askan; Simona; Torphy	4.00; 8.00; 4.00; ~~8.00~~	16.00	4.00; 4.00; 8.00; ~~8.00~~	16.00	32.00
2nd place, silver medalist(s)	William Steinkraus; Neal Shapiro; Kathryn Kusner; Frank Chapot	United States	Main Spring; Slooopy; Fleet Apple; White Lightning	0.00; 8.25; ~~20.00~~; 8.00	16.25	4.00; 0.00; 12.00; ~~28.00~~	16.00	32.25
3rd place, bronze medalist(s)	Vittorio Orlandi; Raimondo D'Inzeo; Graziano Mancinelli; Piero D'Inzeo	Italy	Fulmer Feather; Fiorello; Ambassador; Easter Light	4.00; 8.00; 20.00; ~~87.25~~	32.00	4.00; 4.00; 8.00; ~~48.00~~	16.00	48.00
4	David Broome; John Michael Saywell; Harvey Smith; Ann Moore	Great Britain	Hideaway; Summertime; Manhattan; Psalm	8.00; ~~16.00~~; 4.00; 11.00	23.00	8.00; 4.00; 16.00; ~~21.00~~	28.00	51.00
5	Monica Bachmann-Weier; Paul Weier; Max Hauri; Hermann von Siebenthal	Switzerland	Erbach; Wulf; Haiti; Havanna Royal	9.75; 8.00; 15.50; ~~87.25~~	33.25	8.00; 12.00; 8.00; ~~48.00~~	28.00	61.25
6	Jim Elder; Jim Day; Torchy Millar; Ian Millar	Canada	Houdini; Happy Fellow le Dauphin; Shoeman	4.00; 12.00; ~~23.00~~; 20.00	36.00	4.00; 12.00; 12.00; ~~24.00~~	28.00	64.00
7	Alfonso Segovia; Enrique Martínez; Luis Álvarez Cervera; Jaime, Duque de Aveyro	Spain	Tic Tac; Val de Loire; Acorn; Sunday Beau	4.00; 7.00; 12.00; ~~67.25~~	23.00	15.00; 12.00; 16.00; ~~48.00~~	43.00	66.00
8	Hugo Arrambide; Roberto Tagle; Jorge Llambí; Argentino Molinuevo Jr.	Argentina	Camalote; Simple; Okey Amigo; Abracadabra	15.00; 26.00; 0.00; ~~87.25~~	41.00	12.00; 20.00; 48.00; ~~48.00~~	80.00	121.00
9	Barbara Barone; Américo Simonetti; René Varas	Chile	Quintral; Ataulfo; Anahi	13.00; 28.00; 35.25	76.25			
10	Hubert Parot; Pierre Durand, Sr. Marc Deuquet; Marcel Rozier	France	Tic; Varin; Ulpienne; Sans Souci	18.00; 30.25; 32.00; ~~87.25~~	80.25			
11	François Mathy; Eric Wauters; Françoise Thiry; Jean Damman	Belgium	Talisman; Markies; Hillpark; Vasco de Gama	8.00; 8.00; 87.25; ~~87.25~~	103.25			
12	Marian Kozicki; Stefan Grodzicki; Piotr Wawryniuk; Jan Kowalczyk	Poland	Bronz; Biszka; Poprad; Jastarnia	4.00; 16.00; 87.25; ~~87.25~~	107.25			
13	Vasco Ramires Sr. Carlos Campos; Francisco Caldeira	Portugal	Sir Dubrossais; Ulla de Lancome; Flipper	16.00; 25.75; 65.75	107.50			
14	Aleksandr Nebogov; Viktor Matveyev; Yury Zyabrev; Viktor Lisizyn	Soviet Union	Ekvador; Krokhotny; Grim; Pental	12.00; 28.00; 87.25; ~~DNS~~	127.25			
15	Fernando Hernández; Eduardo Higareda; Joaquín Pérez; Elisa Pérez de las Heras	Mexico	Dorian; Biene; Savando; Askari	24.25; 45.75; 87.25; ~~87.25~~	157.25			
16	Masayasu Sugitani; Teruchiyo Takamiya; Tadashi Fukushima; Tsunekazu Takeda	Japan	Seraphina; Alladin; Anke; Josephine	43.75; 53.25; 87.25; ~~87.25~~	184.25			
17	Ajtony Ákos; Sándor Bognár; László Móra; Pál Széplaki	Hungary	Özike; Faklyas; Betty; Balvany	12.00; 87.25; 87.25; ~~DNS~~	186.50			
