= Equestrian at the 1972 Summer Olympics – Individual jumping =

Individual jumping at the Games of the XX Olympiad
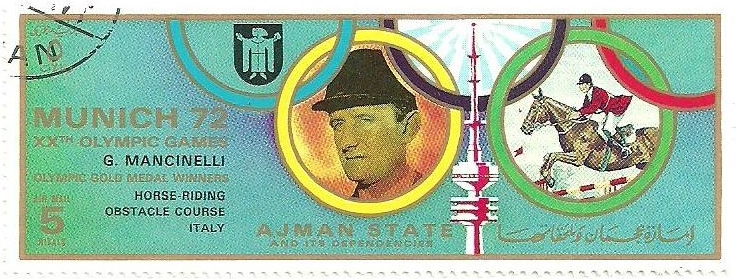
- Ajman stamp depicting gold medalist Graziano Mancinelli
- Venue: Olympic Stadium
- Date: 3 September 1972
- Competitors: 54 from 21 nations

Medalists
1st place, gold medalist(s)		Graziano Mancinelli	Italy
2nd place, silver medalist(s)		Ann Moore	Great Britain
3rd place, bronze medalist(s)		Neal Shapiro	United States

The individual show jumping in equestrian at the 1972 Summer Olympics in Munich was held at Olympic Stadium on 3 September. It was open to men and women. There were 54 competitors from 21 nations, with two additional non-starters. The event was won by Graziano Mancinelli of Italy, the nation's first victory in individual jumping since 1960 and third overall, tying France for most of all nations. Great Britain extended its podium streak in the event to four Games (no other nation had managed more than two) with Ann Moore's silver. The United States reach the podium for a second straight Games as Neal Shapiro took bronze.

== Background ==
This was the 14th appearance of the event, which had first been held at the 1900 Summer Olympics and has been held at every Summer Olympics at which equestrian sports have been featured (that is, excluding 1896, 1904, and 1908). It is the oldest event on the current programme, the only one that was held in 1900. The team and individual events remained separated, as they had been starting in 1968.

Four of the top 10 riders from the 1968 competition returned: gold medalist William Steinkraus of the United States, two-time (1960 and 1968) bronze medalist David Broome of Great Britain, sixth-place finisher Jim Elder of Canada, and seventh-place finisher Piero D'Inzeo of Italy. Also returning was D'Inzeo's brother Raimondo D'Inzeo. Raimondo had won the 1960 gold and 1956 silver medals; Piero had won the 1960 silver and 1956 bronze medals. The brothers were competing in their seventh Olympics; they would be the first to reach eight Games. Broome was the reigning (1970) World Champion.

For only the second time, no nations made their debut in the event. France competed for the 13th time, most of any nation, having missed the individual jumping only in 1932.

== Competition format ==
The competition used the two-round format introduced in 1952, with the elimination feature added in 1968. The top 20 riders from the first round qualified for the second round, both rounds were then combined to determine placement, if tied a jump-off between all tied riders would determine the winners.

The first round was held on a course 760 metres long with 14 obstacles (17 total jumps), including a 5 metres water jump and five oxers. The second round course was shorter, at 660 metres and 10 obstacles (13 jumps).

== Schedule ==
All times are Central European Time (UTC+1)

Date	Time	Round
Sunday, 3 September 1972	10:00	Round 1 Round 2

== Results ==
Rank	Rider	Nation	Horse	Round 1	Round 2	Total	Jump-off
1st place, gold medalist(s)	Graziano Mancinelli	Italy	Ambassador	0.00	8.00	8.00	0.00
2nd place, silver medalist(s)	Ann Moore	Great Britain	Psalm	0.00	8.00	8.00	3.00
3rd place, bronze medalist(s)	Neal Shapiro	United States	Sloopy	4.00	4.00	8.00	8.00
4	Jim Day	Canada	Steelmaster	0.00	8.75	8.75	—N/a
4	Hugo Simon	Austria	Lavendel	4.75	4.00	8.75	—N/a
4	Hartwig Steenken	West Germany	Simona	4.00	4.75	8.75	—N/a
7	Jean-Marcel Rozier	France	Sans Souci	4.00	8.00	12.00	—N/a
8	Alfonso Segovia	Spain	Tic Tac	4.00	12.00	16.00	—N/a
8	Fritz Ligges	West Germany	Robin	4.00	12.00	16.00	—N/a
10	Kathy Kusner	United States	Fleet Apple	4.00	16.00	20.00	—N/a
10	René Varas	Chile	Quintral	8.00	12.00	20.00	—N/a
10	Enrique Martínez	Spain	Val de Loire	8.00	12.00	20.00	—N/a
13	Carlos Campos	Portugal	Ulla de Lancôme	4.00	16.50	20.50	—N/a
14	David Broome	Great Britain	Manhattan	8.00	13.25	21.25	—N/a
15	Michael Saywell	Great Britain	Hideaway	8.00	16.25	24.25	—N/a
16	Gerhard Wiltfang	West Germany	Askan	4.00	28.75	32.75	—N/a
17	Stefan Grodzicki	Poland	Biszka	8.00	DNF	DNF	—N/a
17	Åke Hultberg	Sweden	El-Vis	8.00	DNF	DNF	—N/a
19	Joaquín Pérez	Mexico	Savando	8.25	DNF	DNF	—N/a
19	Elisa Pérez de las Heras	Mexico	Askari	8.25	DNF	DNF	—N/a
21	Marian Kozicki	Poland	Bronz	8.50	Did not advance		—N/a
22	Piero D'Inzeo	Italy	Easter Light	12.00	Did not advance		—N/a
22	Hugo Miguel Arrambide	Argentina	Camalote	12.00	Did not advance		—N/a
22	Roberto Nielsen-Reyes	Bolivia	Conquistador	12.00	Did not advance		—N/a
22	Raimondo D'Inzeo	Italy	Fiorello	12.00	Did not advance		—N/a
22	Paul Weier	Switzerland	Wulf	12.00	Did not advance		—N/a
22	Jorge Llambí	Argentina	Okey Amigo	12.00	Did not advance		—N/a
22	William Steinkraus	United States	Snowbound	12.00	Did not advance		—N/a
29	Carlos César Delía	Argentina	Cardon	12.25	Did not advance		—N/a
30	Max Hauri	Switzerland	Haiti	12.50	Did not advance		—N/a
31	Hubert Parot	France	Tic	16.00	Did not advance		—N/a
31	François Mathy	Belgium	Talisman	16.00	Did not advance		—N/a
31	Torchy Millar	Canada	Le Dauphin	16.00	Did not advance		—N/a
31	Francisco Caldeira	Portugal	Can-Can	16.00	Did not advance		—N/a
31	Antônio Simões	Brazil	Bon Soir	16.00	Did not advance		—N/a
31	Viktor Matveyev	Soviet Union	Krokhoutny	16.00	Did not advance		—N/a
37	Vasco Ramires Sr.	Portugal	Sir du Brossais	20.00	Did not advance		—N/a
37	Janou Lefèbvre	France	Rocket	20.00	Did not advance		—N/a
39	Nelson Pessoa	Brazil	Nagir	21.00	Did not advance		—N/a
40	Jean Damman	Belgium	Vasco de Gama	21.25	Did not advance		—N/a
41	Aleksandr Nebogov	Soviet Union	Ecuador	22.00	Did not advance		—N/a
42	Tsunekazu Takeda	Japan	Josephine	23.00	Did not advance		—N/a
43	Masayasu Sugitani	Japan	Seraphina	24.00	Did not advance		—N/a
43	Luis Álvarez	Spain	Appell	24.00	Did not advance		—N/a
43	Jim Elder	Canada	Shoeman	24.00	Did not advance		—N/a
43	Tadashi Fukushima	Japan	Anke	24.00	Did not advance		—N/a
47	Kurt Maeder	Switzerland	Abraxon	28.00	Did not advance		—N/a
47	Pál Széplaki	Hungary	Kemal	28.00	Did not advance		—N/a
49	Ajtony Ákos	Hungary	Ozike	29.00	Did not advance		—N/a
49	Eric Wauters	Belgium	Markies	29.00	Did not advance		—N/a
51	Eduardo Higareda	Mexico	Biene	30.75	Did not advance		—N/a
—	László Móra	Hungary	Antaryl	DNF	Did not advance		—N/a
—	Viktor Lisitsyn	Soviet Union	Piniatelli	DNF	Did not advance		—N/a
—	Américo Simonetti	Chile	Altue	DNF	Did not advance		—N/a
—	Barbara Barone	Chile	Anahi	DNS	Did not advance		—N/a
—	Jan Kowalczyk	Poland	Chandzar	DNS	Did not advance		—N/a
