= Portugal at the 1972 Summer Olympics =

- IOC code: POR
- NOC: Olympic Committee of Portugal

in Munich
- Competitors: 28 in 8 sports
- Flag bearer: Armando Aldegalega (athletics)
- Officials: 20
- Medals: Gold 0 Silver 0 Bronze 0 Total 0

Summer Olympics appearances (overview)
- 1912; 1920; 1924; 1928; 1932; 1936; 1948; 1952; 1956; 1960; 1964; 1968; 1972; 1976; 1980; 1984; 1988; 1992; 1996; 2000; 2004; 2008; 2012; 2016; 2020; 2024; 2028

Portugal competed at the 1972 Summer Olympics in Munich, West Germany. 29 competitors, all men, took part in 28 events in 8 sports.

== Athletics ==
Men's 110m Hurdles:

- Alberto Filipe Matos – 1st round: 7th (heat 3)

Men's 400m:

- Fernando Silva – 1st round: 6th (heat 5)

Men's 400m Hurdles:

- José de Jesus Carvalho – 1st round: 6th (heat 5)

Men's 800m:

- Fernando Pacheco Mamede – 1st round: 4th (heat 4)

Men's 1500m:

- Fernando Pacheco Mamede – 1st round: 6th (heat 7)

Men's 5000m:

- Carlos Lopes – 1st round: 9th (heat 1)

Men's 10000m:

- Carlos Lopes – 1st round: 9th (heat 3)

Men's Marathon:

- Armando Aldegalega – 41st (2:28.24,6)

Men's 4 × 400 m:

- Alberto Filipe Matos, Fernando Silva, Fernando Pacheco Mamede and José de Jesus Carvalho – 1st round: 7th (heat 1)

== Equestrian ==
Individual Jumping:

- Carlos Campos – 13th
- Francisco Caldeira – eliminated
- Vasco Ramires Sr. – eliminated

Team Jumping:

- Carlos Campos, Francisco Caldeira and Vasco Ramires Sr. – 13th (107,5 points)

== Judo ==
Men's Half-Middleweight (–70 kg):

- António Roquete Andrade – qualifiers (poule A)

Men's Middleweight (–80 kg):

- Orlando Ferreira – qualifiers (poule B)

== Rowing ==
Men's Single Sculls

- José Lopes Marques

- Heat – 8:39.73
- Repechage – 8:54.27 (→ did not advance)

Double Sculls:

- Carlos Almeida Oliveira and Manuel Silva Barroso – repechage: 4th (heat 2)

== Sailing ==
Dragon:

- Mário Quina, Fernando Pinto Coelho Bello and Francisco Quina – 21st (120 points)

Finn:

- José Quina – 11th (190,7 points)

Star:

- António Mardel Correia and Ulrich Henrique Anjos – 6th (68,4 points)

== Shooting ==
Five male shooters represented Portugal in 1972.

25 m pistol

- André Antunes – 36th (578 marks)

50 m pistol

- André Antunes – 55th (510 marks)

50 m rifle, prone

- César Batista – 90th (578 marks)
- Mário Ribeiro – 92nd (575 marks)

50 m rifle, three positions

- César Batista – 61st (1057 marks)
- Mário Ribeiro – 63rd (1051 marks)

Skeet

- José de Matos – 49th (179 marks)

Trap

- Armando Silva Marques – 19th (187 marks)

== Weightlifting ==
Men's Bantamweight (–56 kg):

- Raul Diniz – 21st (285 points)

== Wrestling ==
Men's Freestyle Featherweight (–62 kg):

- Orlando Gonçalves – 2nd round: eliminated

Men's Greco-Roman Flyweight (–52 kg):

- Leonel Duarte – 2nd round: eliminated

Men's Greco-Roman Bantamweight (–57 kg):

- Luís Grilo – 4th round: eliminated

== Officials ==
- Fernando Machado (chief of mission)
- Dido Fonseca Aguiar
- Francisco Ferreira Alves
- Fernando Sommer Andrade
- Francisco Augusto
- Luis V. Caldas
- José Carvalhosa
- António Castanheira
- António Madeira Correia
- Domingos A. Souse Coutinho
- Carlos F. Dias Silva
- João Esteves
- Francisco Ferreira
- Manuel Forão
- Francisco Graça Gordo
- Carlos M. Loureiro
- Fernando M. C. Costa Matos
- António M. M. Moreira
- Mário Alberto Pereira
- Lélio Almeida Ribeiro
- Manuel Silva Pereira
