= Lisitsyn =

Lisitsyn or Lisitsin (Russian: Лисицын, feminine: Lisitsyna or Lisitsina, from лисица meaning fox) is a Russian surname. Notable people with the name include:

- Lisitsyn family, Russian family of samovar-makers, metalworkers and businesspeople
- Aleksandr Lisitsyn, Russian trampoline gymnast
- Aleksandr Ivanovich Lisitsyn (1901–1975), Soviet general
- Anatoly Lisitsyn (born 1947), Russian statesman
- Anna Lisitsyna (1922–1942), Soviet partisan
- Dmitry Lisitsyn, Russian environmentalist
- Georgy Lisitsin (1909–1972), Russian chess player
- Viktor Lisitsyn, Soviet equestrian
- Vladimir Lisitsin (1938–1971), Soviet football player
- Yevhen Lysytsyn (born 1981), Ukrainian football player
