= Damman =

Damman may refer to:

- Dammam, the sixth-most populous city in Saudi Arabia
- Damman (surname)

== See also ==
- Daman (disambiguation)
