= Dahman (surname) =

Dahman or Dahmane is a surname. Notable people with the surname include:

- Fatima Dahman (born 1992), Yemeni sprinter
- Mohammed Dahman (1959–2024), Syrian footballer
- Hamza Dahmane (born 1990), Algerian footballer
- Mohamed Dahmane (born 1982), Algerian footballer
- Mokhtar Dahmane (1931–2023), Algerian footballer

== See also ==
- Dahan (surname)
- Dahmen (surname)
- Damman (surname)
- Lahman
