= Hermann von Siebenthal =

Swiss equestrian

Personal information
- Nationality: Swiss
- Born: 27 December 1934; Denezy, Switzerland
- Died: 31 March 2014 (aged 79); Kappelen, Switzerland

Sport
- Sport: Equestrian

Hermann von Siebenthal (27 December 1934 – 31 March 2014) was a Swiss equestrian. He competed in the team jumping event at the 1972 Summer Olympics.
