= Luis Jaime Carvajal y Salas =

Spanish equestrian (1942–2023)

Personal information
- Nationality: Spanish
- Born: 29 October 1942
- Died: 7 February 2023 (aged 80)

Sport
- Sport: Equestrian
Medal record
Equestrian
Representing Spain
Mediterranean Games
Bronze medal – third place	1979 Split	Team jumping

Luis Jaime Carvajal y Salas, 5th Duke of Aveyro (29 October 1942 – 7 February 2023) was a Spanish equestrian. He competed in the team jumping event at the 1972 Summer Olympics.
