= Kurt Maeder =

Swiss equestrian

Personal information
- Nationality: Swiss
- Born: 10 September 1952 (age 72)

Sport
- Sport: Equestrian

Kurt Maeder (born 10 September 1952) is a Swiss equestrian. He competed in the individual jumping event at the 1972 Summer Olympics.
