= Samovar =

Metal container used to heat and boil water

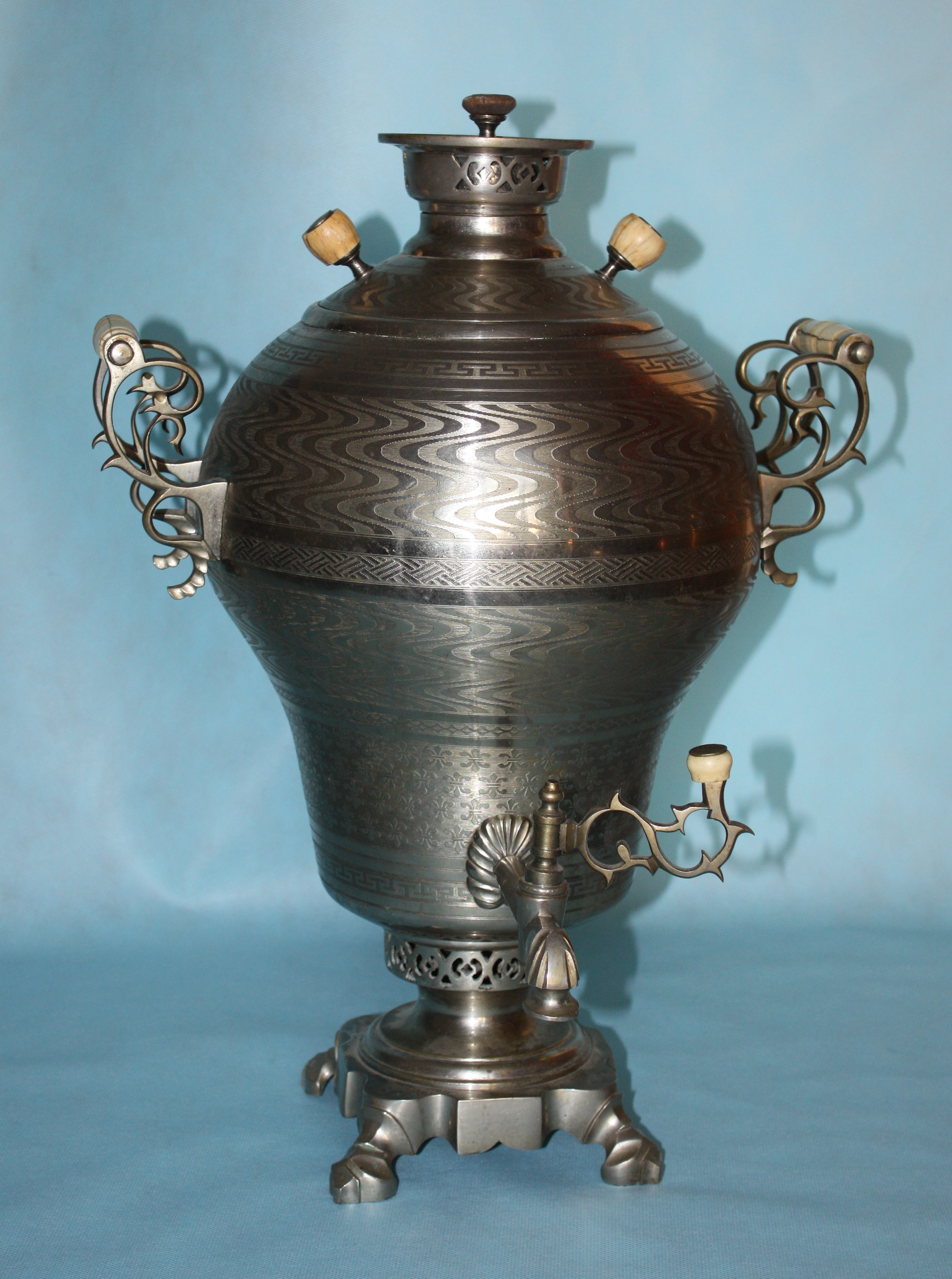
Samovar in Tula, Russia

A samovar (Russian: самовар, IPA: [səmɐˈvar], lit. 'self-brewer') is a metal container traditionally used to heat and boil water. Although originating in Russia, the samovar is well known outside of the country and has spread through Russian culture to other parts of Eastern Europe, as well as West and Central and South Asia. Since the heated water is typically used to make tea, many samovars have a ring-shaped attachment (конфорка, konforka) around the chimney to hold and heat a teapot filled with tea concentrate. Though traditionally heated with coal or kindling, many newer samovars use electricity to heat water in a manner similar to an electric water boiler.

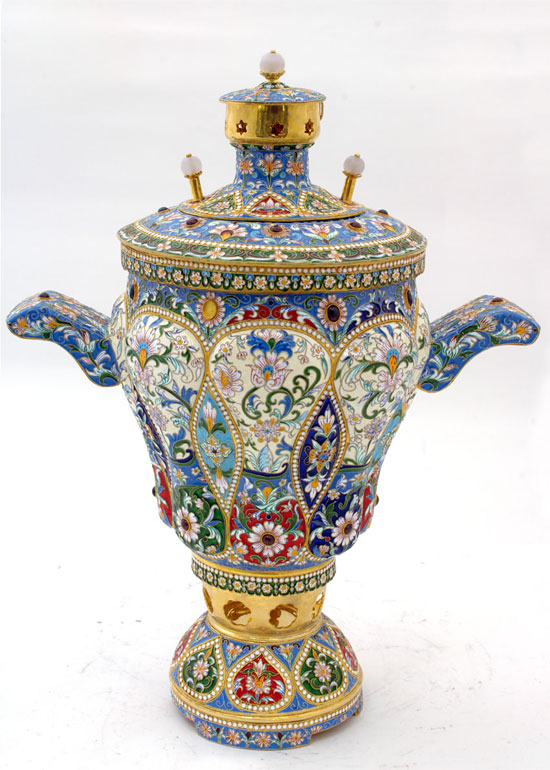
Russian silver & enamel samovar, late 19th century

== Description ==
A Samovar is typically made of iron, copper, polished brass, bronze, silver, gold, tin, or nickel—and consists of a body, base and chimney, cover and steam vent, handles, tap and key, crown and ring, chimney extension and cap, drip-bowl, and teapot. The body shape can be an urn, krater, barrel, cylinder, or sphere. Sizes and designs vary, from very large capacity to smaller family-sized vessels, holding four litres (1.1 US gal), and those of a modest one litre (0.26 US gal) size.

A traditional samovar consists of a large metal container with a tap near the bottom and a metal pipe running vertically through the middle. The pipe is filled with solid fuel which is ignited to heat the water in the surrounding container. A small (six-to-eight-inch, 15 to 20 cm) chimney is put on the top to ensure draft. After the water boils and the fire is extinguished, the chimney can be removed and a teapot placed on top to be heated by the rising hot air. The teapot is used to brew a strong concentrate of tea known as zavarka (заварка). The tea is served by diluting this concentrate with boiled water from the main container, usually at a water-to-tea ratio of 10 to 1, varying to taste.

== History ==
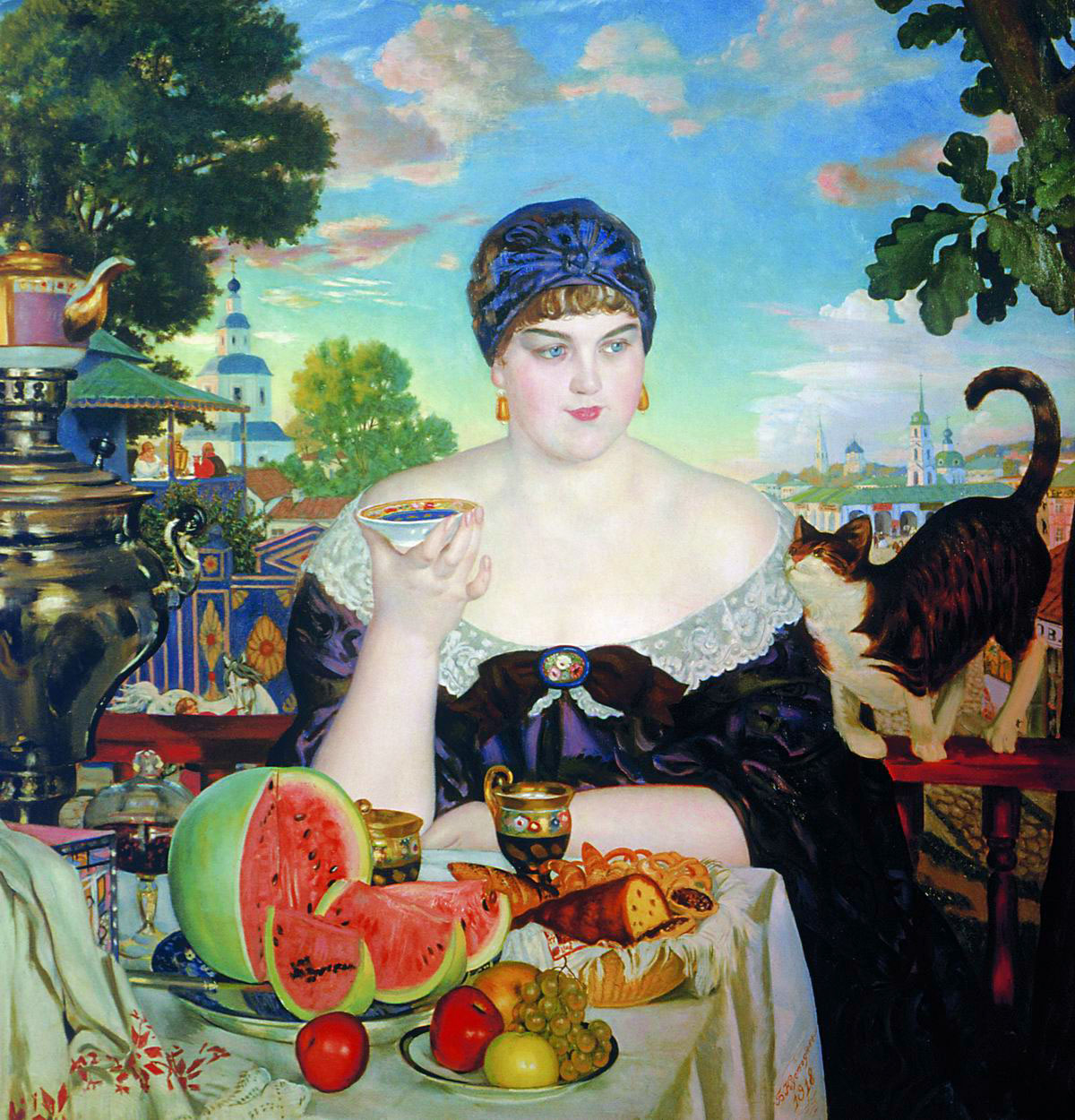
The Merchant's Wife at tea time by Boris Kustodiev, showcasing Russian tea culture

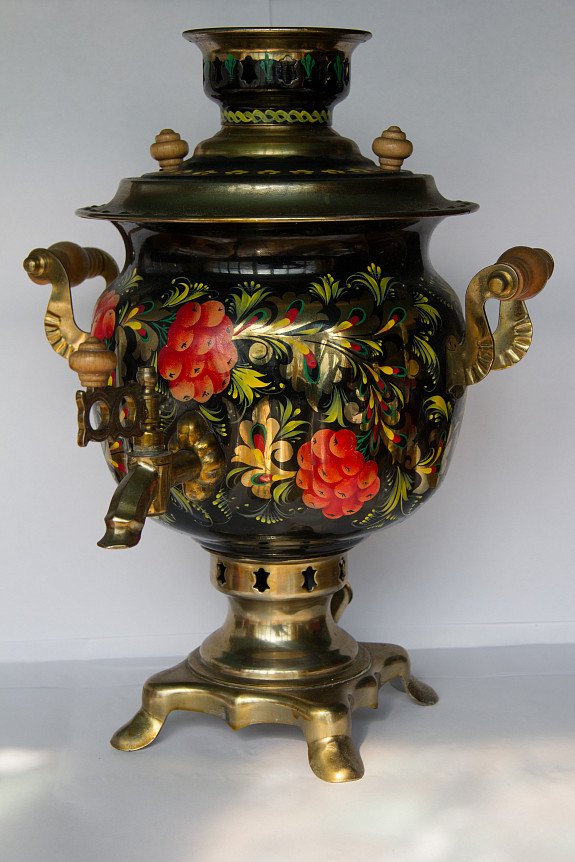
Samovar with painting

The origin and history of the samovar prior to the 18th century is unknown. Connections exist to a similar Greek water-heater of classical antiquity, the autepsa, a vase with a central tube for coal. The Russian tradition was probably influenced by Byzantine and Central Asian cultures. Conversely, Russian culture also influenced Asian, Western European and Byzantine cultures. "Samovar-like" pottery found in Shaki, Azerbaijan in 1989 was estimated to be at least 3,600 years old. While it differed from modern samovars in many respects, it contained the distinguishing functional feature of an inner cylindrical tube that increased the area available for heating the water. Unlike modern samovars, the tube was not closed from below, and so the device relied on an external fire (i.e. by placing it above the flame) instead of carrying its fuel and fire internally.

The first historically recorded samovar-makers were the Russian Lisitsyn brothers, Ivan Fyodorovich and Nazar Fyodorovich. From their childhood they were engaged in metalworking at the brass factory of their father, Fyodor Ivanovich Lisitsyn. In 1778 they made a samovar, and the same year Nazar Lisitsyn registered the first samovar-making factory in Russia. They may not have been the inventors of the samovar, but they were the first documented samovar-makers, and their various and beautiful samovar designs became very influential throughout the later history of samovar-making. These and other early producers lived in Tula, a city known for its metalworkers and arms-makers. Since the 18th century Tula has been also the main center of Russian samovar production, with tul'sky samovar being the brand mark of the city. A Russian saying equivalent to "carrying coal to Newcastle" is "to travel to Tula with one's own samovar". Although Central Russia and the Ural region were among the first Samovar producers, over time several samovar producers emerged all over Russia, which gave the samovar its different local characteristics. By the 19th century samovars were already a common feature of Russian tea culture. They were produced in large numbers and exported to Central Asia and other regions.

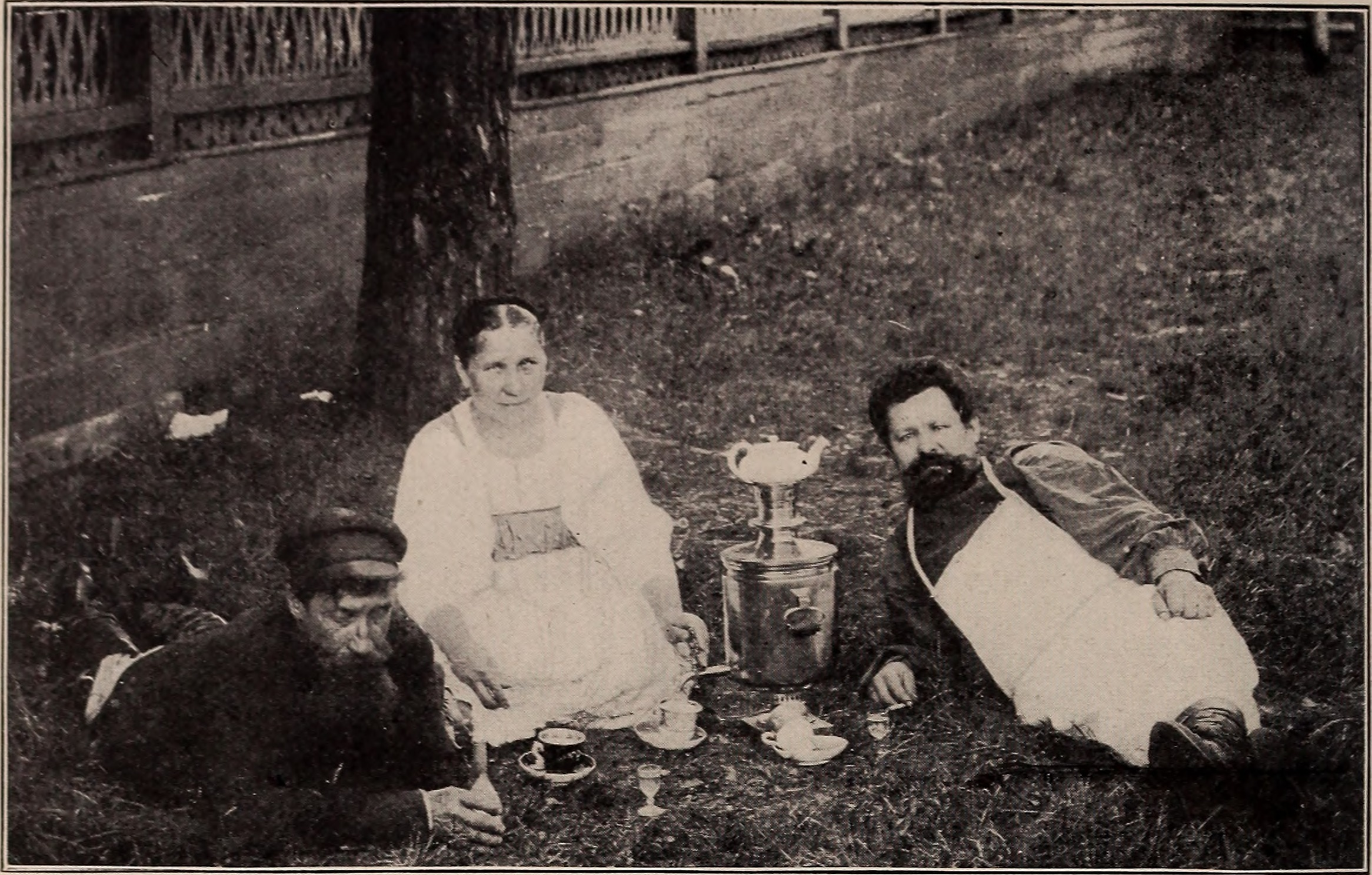
A samovar in use at an outdoor picnic

The samovar was an important attribute of Russian households and taverns to tea-drinking. It was used by all classes, from the poorest peasants up to the most well-suited people. The Russian expression "to have a sit by the samovar" means to have a leisurely talk while drinking tea from a samovar. In everyday use samovars were an economical permanent source of hot water in older times. Various slow-burning items could be used for fuel, such as charcoal or dry pinecones. When not in use, the fire in the samovar pipe faintly smouldered. As needed it could be quickly rekindled with the help of bellows. Although a Russian jackboot сапог (sapog) could be used for this purpose, bellows were manufactured specifically for use on samovars. Today samovars are popular souvenirs among tourists in Russia.

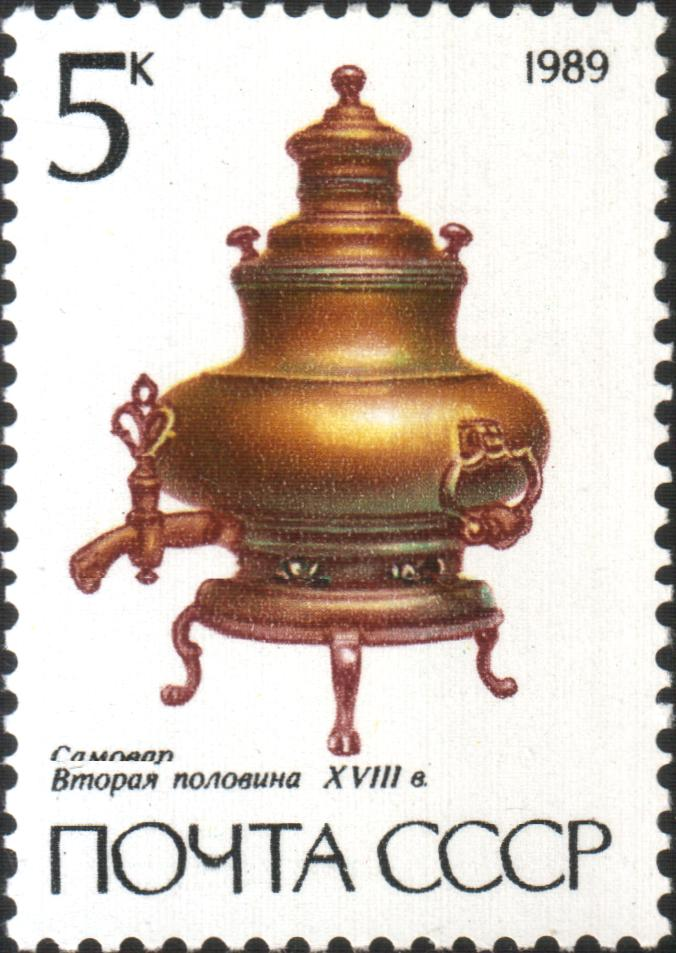
Baroque samovar, 18th century Samovars, from a 1989 series of USSR postage stamps

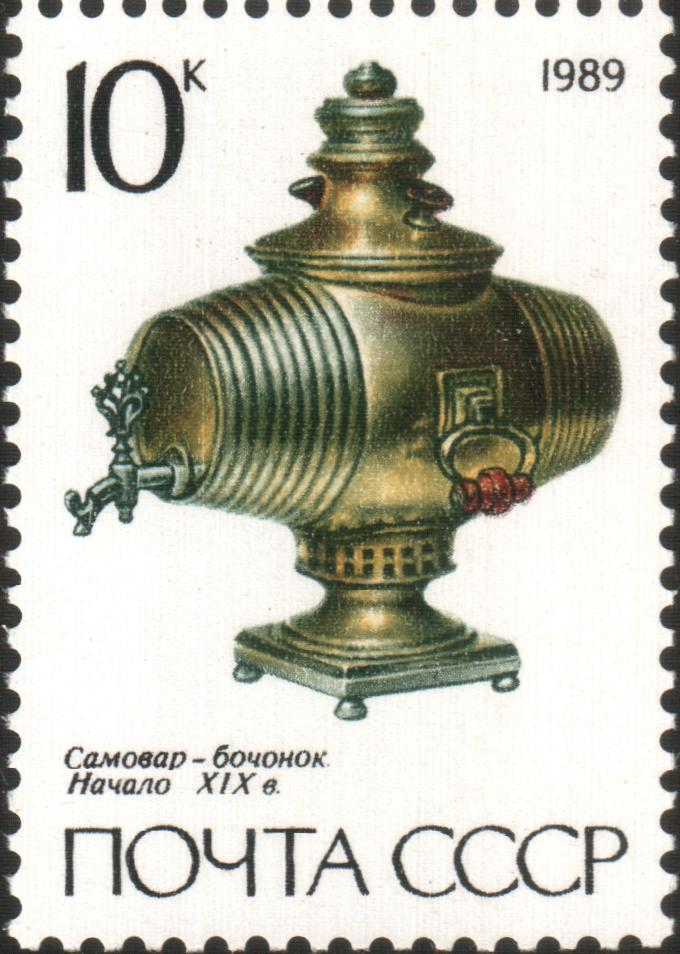
Barrel type samovar, early 1800s, from a 1989 series of USSR postage stamps

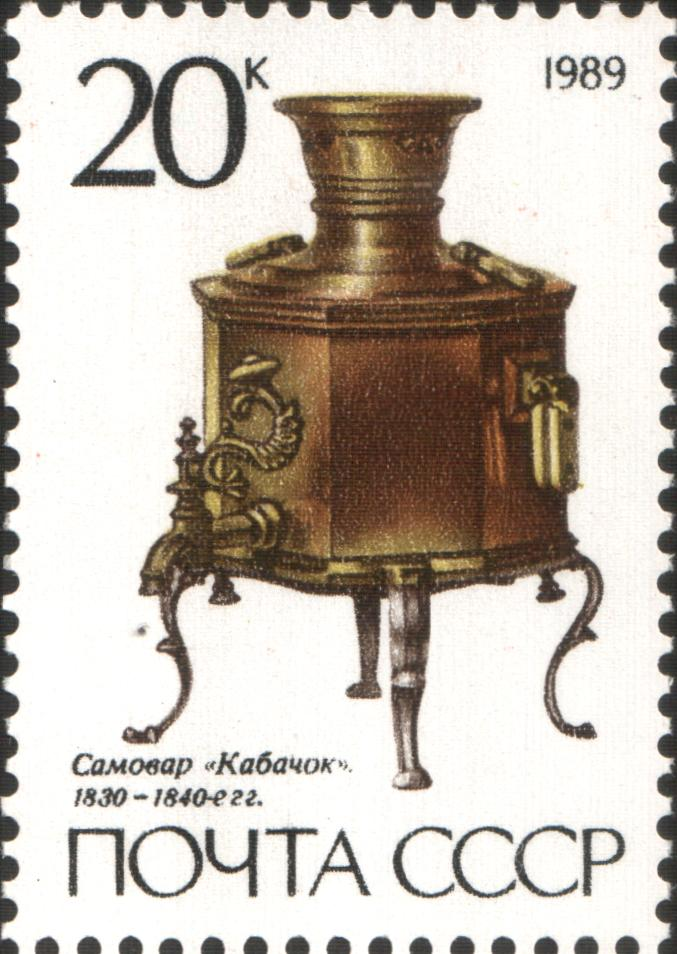
"Squash" type samovar, c. 1830, from a 1989 series of USSR postage stamps

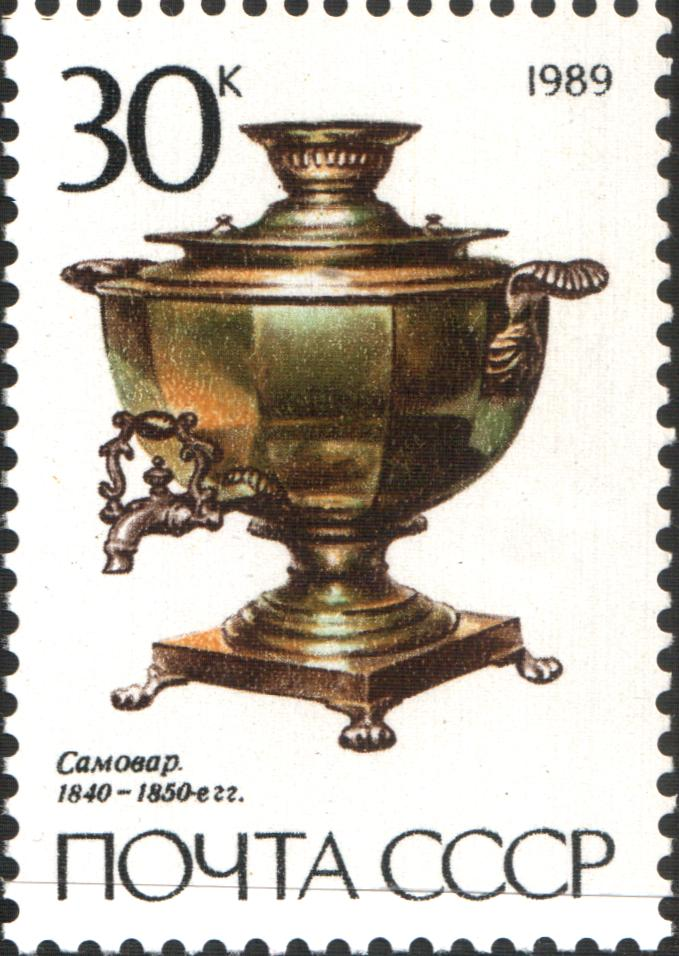
Samovar in the form of a classical vase, c. 1840, from a 1989 series of USSR postage stamps

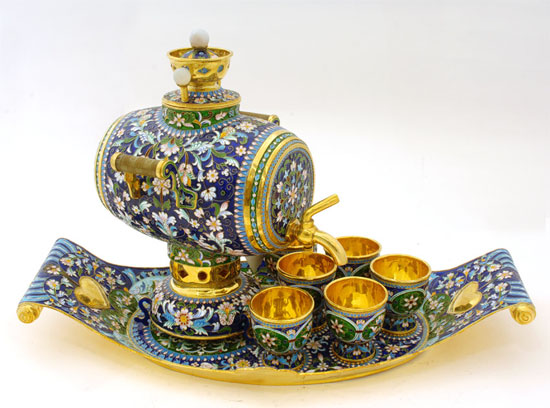
Russian silver & enamel samovar with cup & tray, late 19th century

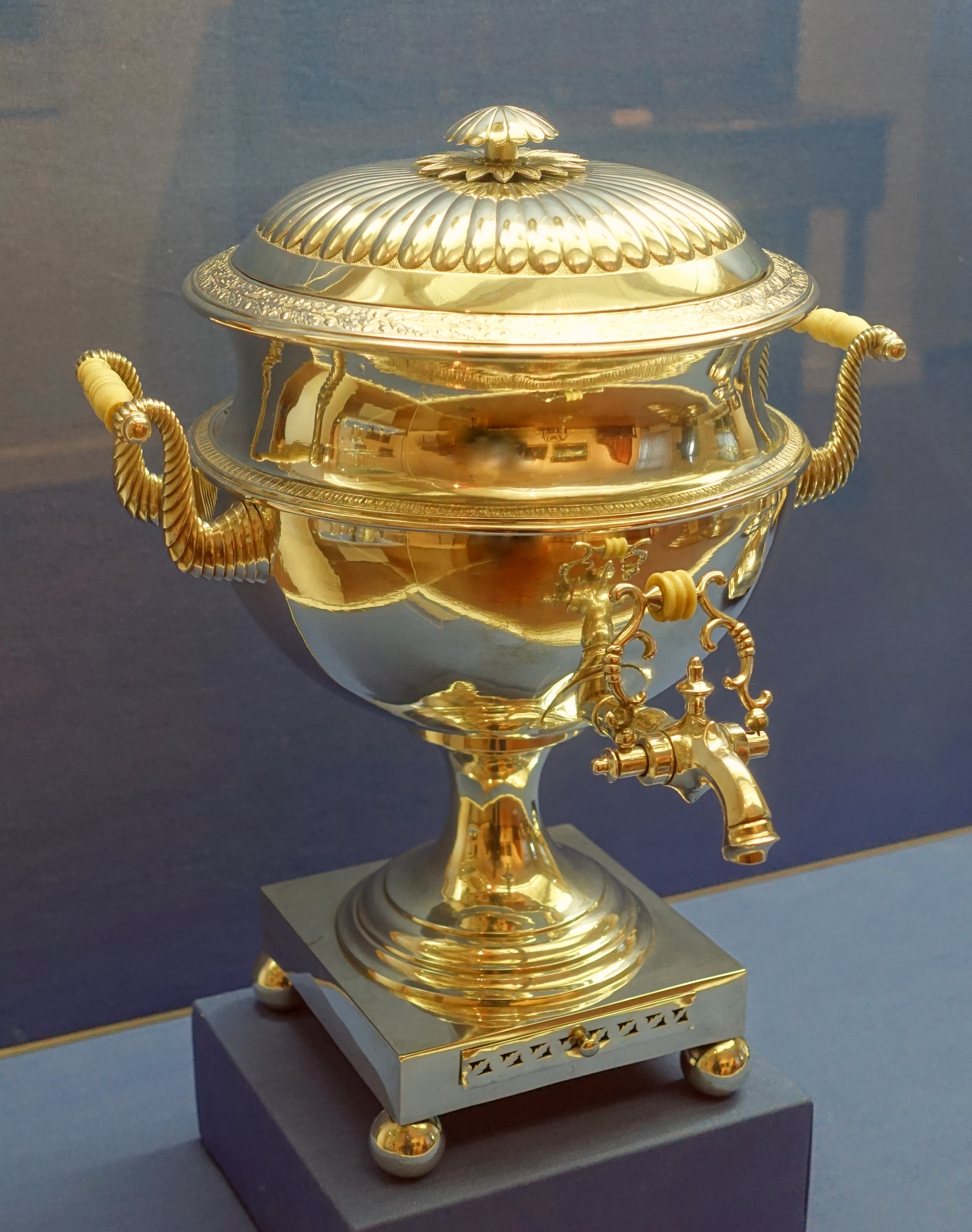
Samovar by Georg Stephan Dorffer, German museum

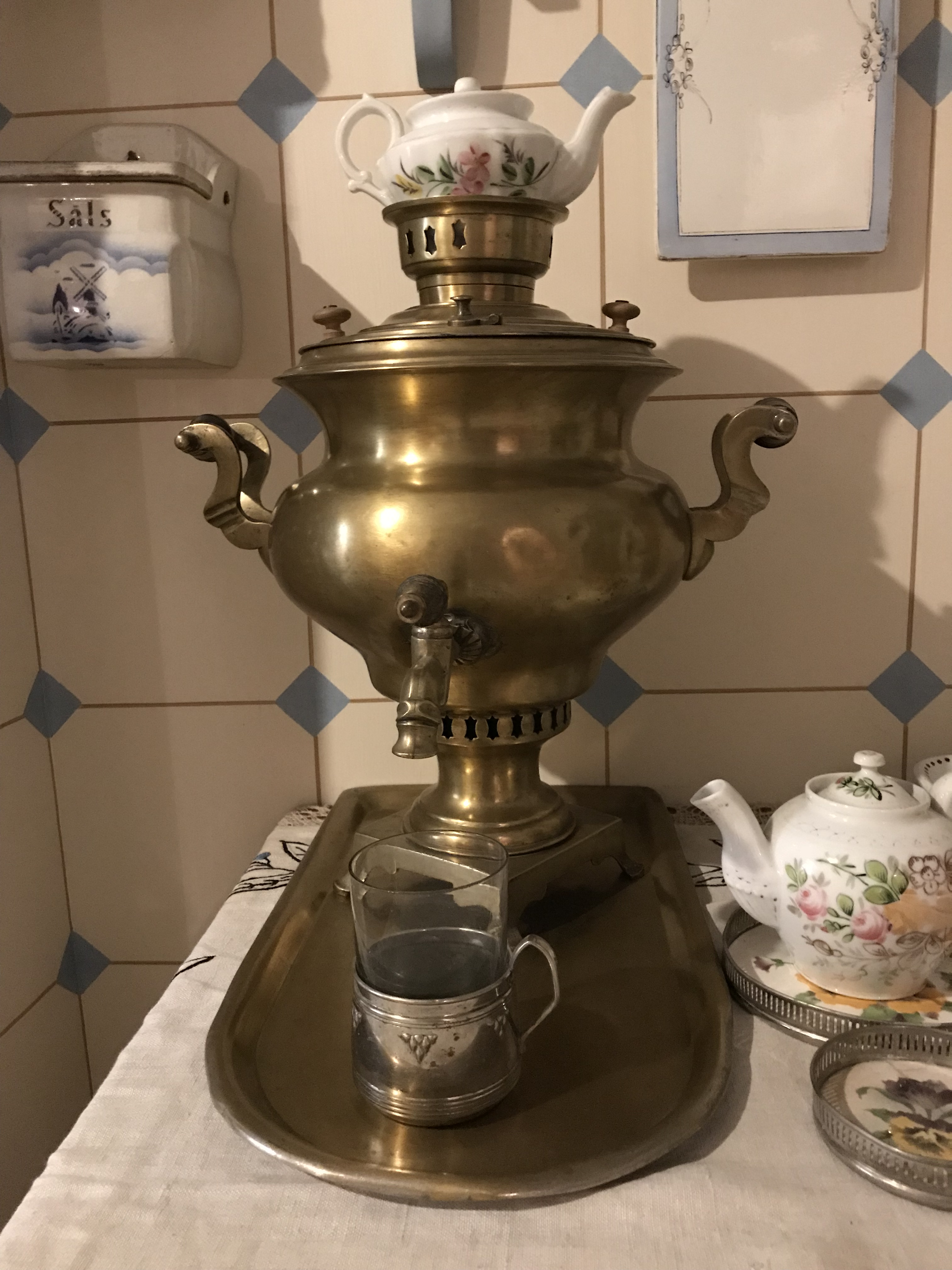
Samovar with teapot in Riga, Latvia. Latvia was influenced by the Russian culture and there still exists a Russian-speaking community.

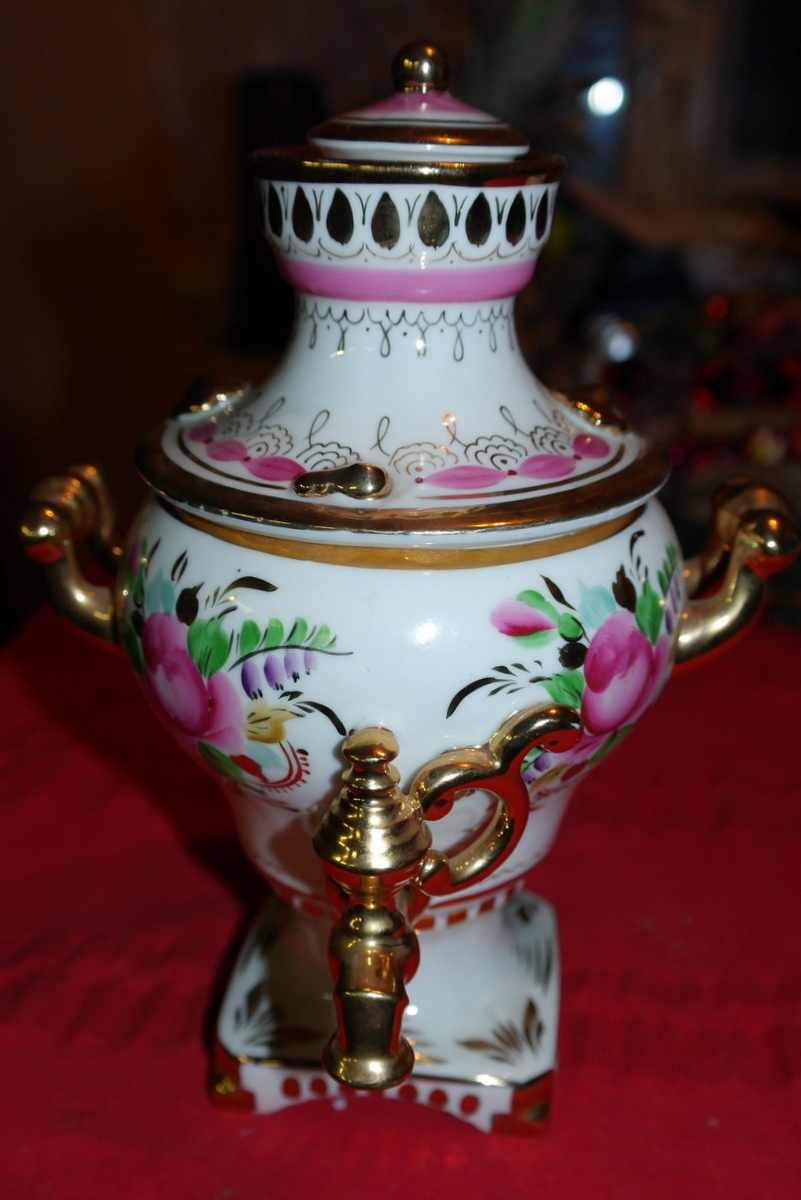
Samovar made out of ceramic (Gzhel samovar)

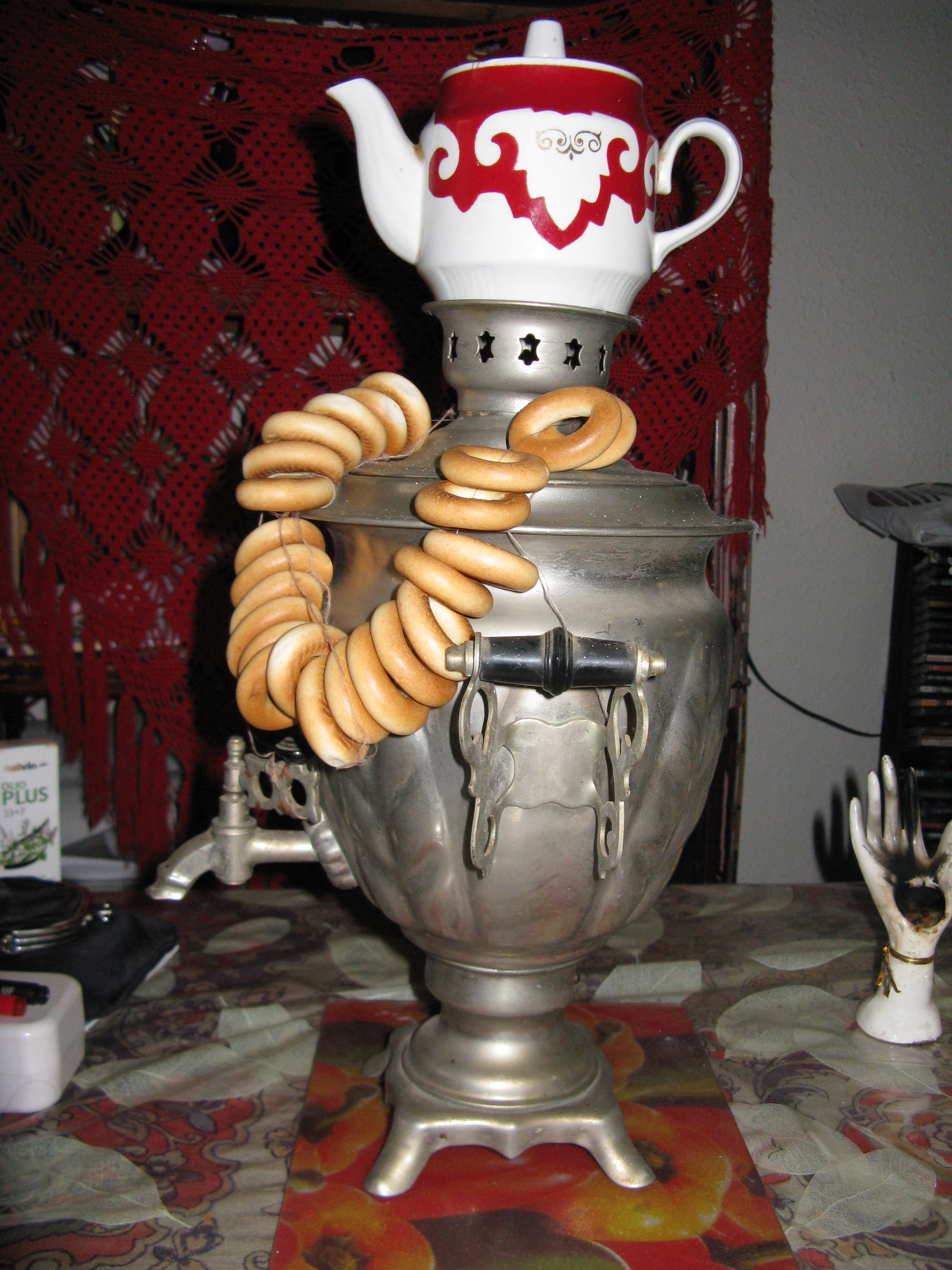
Samovar of old production

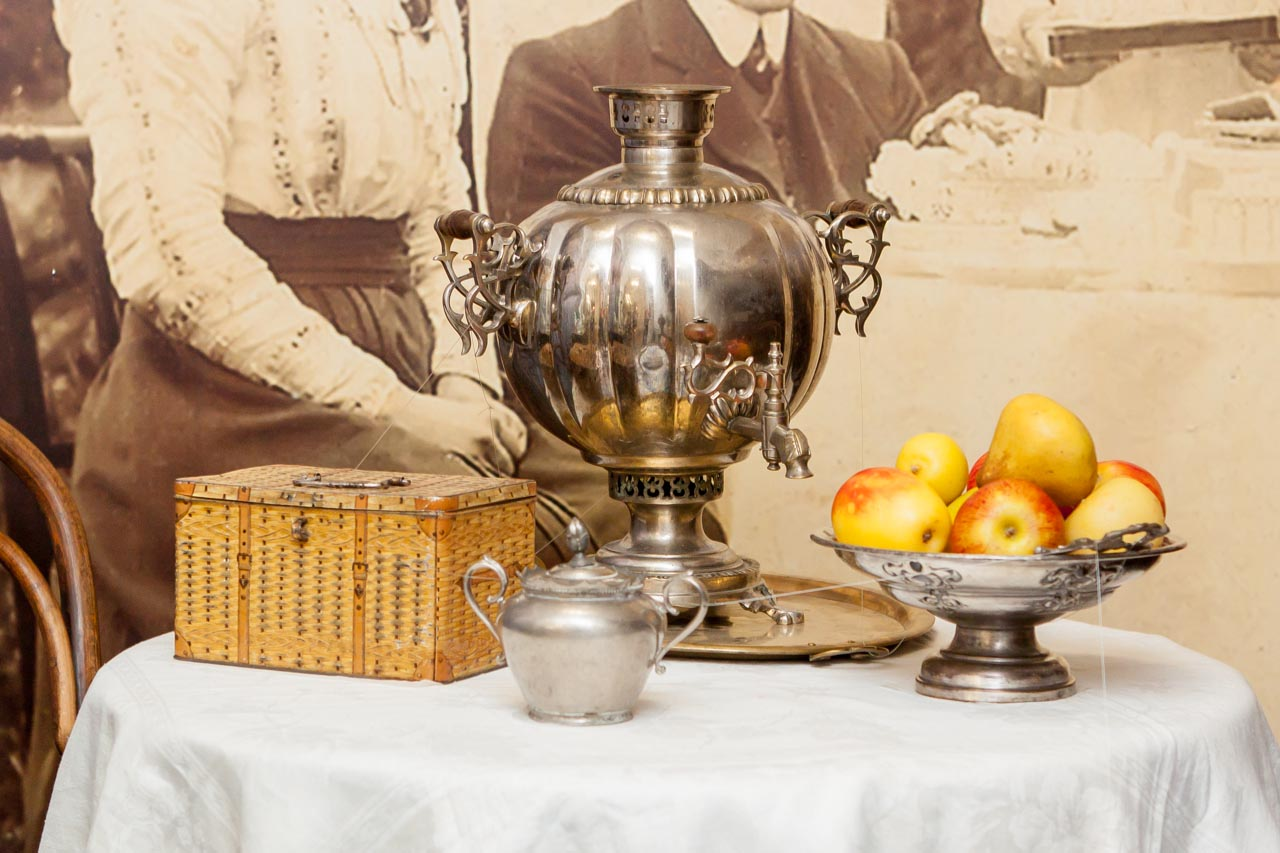
Samovar in Tomsk museum

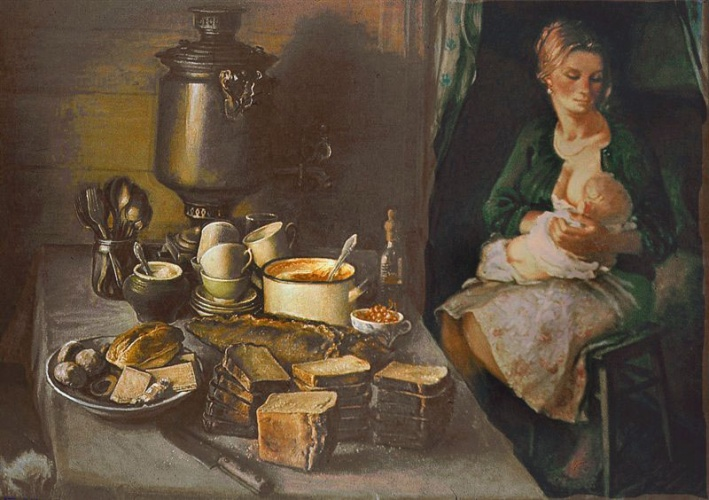
Samovar on table. Art by Russian painter Sergei Smirnov, made in 1981

== Outside Russia ==
The Russian word was adopted as Persian: سماور samovar, and Turkish: semaver.

=== Iran ===
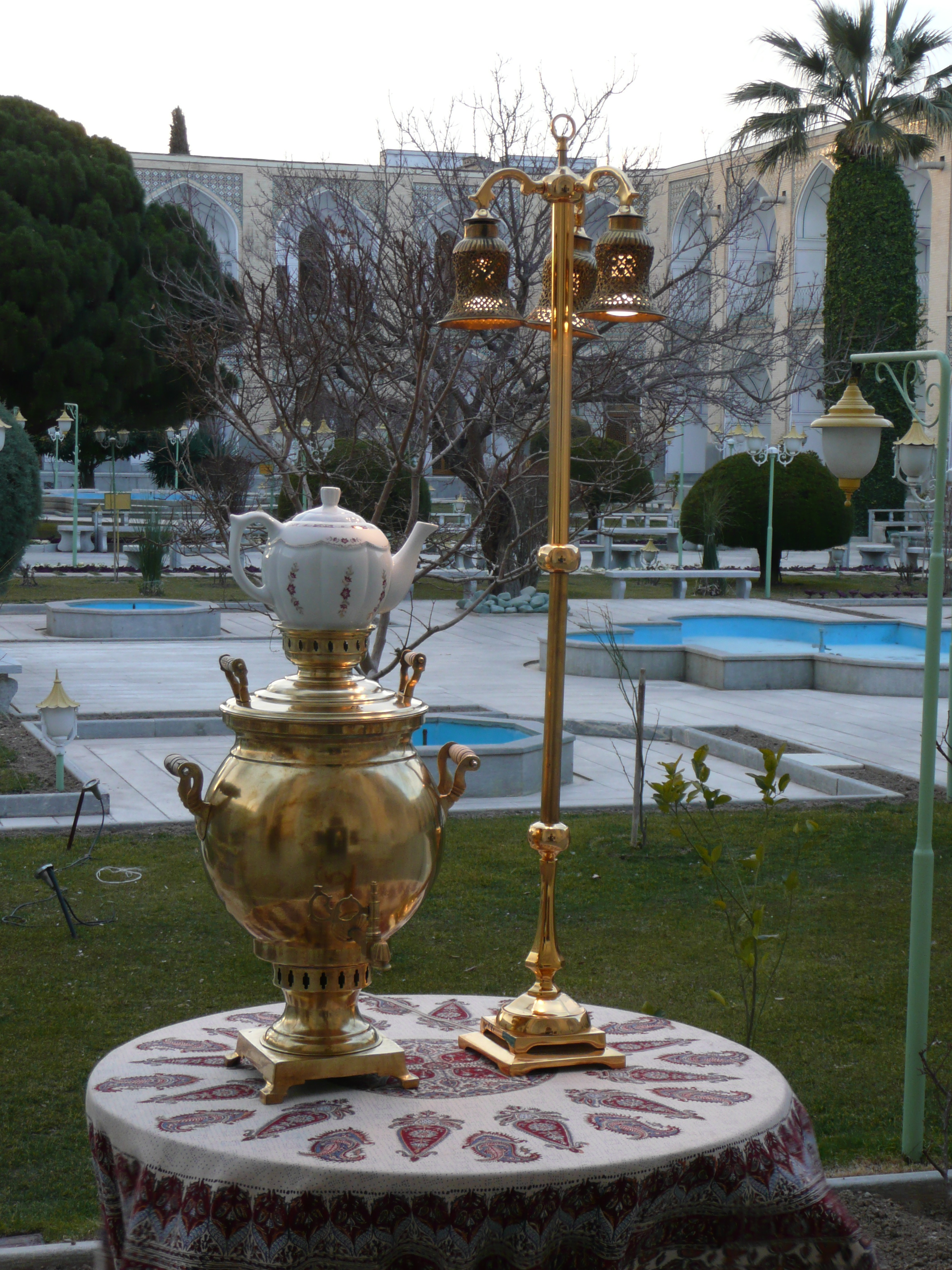
Samovar in Isfahan, Iran

Samovar (Persian: samăvar) culture has an analog in Iran and is maintained by expatriates around the world. In Iran, samovars have been used for at least two centuries (roughly since the era of close political and ethnic contact between Russia and Iran started), and electrical, oil-burning or natural gas-consuming samovars are still common. The Iranian city of Borujerd has been the main center of samovar production and a few workshops still produce hand-made samovars. Borujerd's samovars are often made with German silver, in keeping with the varshosazi artistic style. Iranian craftsmen used Persian art motifs in their samovar production. The art samovars of Borujerd are often displayed in Iranian and Western museums as illustrations of Iranian art and handicraft.

=== Kashmir ===
Samvar (Kashmiri Pronunciation), near Saffron fields of Pampore in Kashmir Valley.

Kashmiri samovars are made of copper, sometimes with engraved or embossed calligraphic motifs. Historically, the Kashmiris made two variants of samovar; copper samovars typically used by Muslims as well as brass samovars with a nickel-plated inner lining used by local Hindus called Kashmiri Pandit. Inside a samovar there is a heating element in which charcoal and live coals are placed in order to boil water. Green tea leaves, salt, cardamom, and cinnamon are often brewed with these samovars.

=== Turkey ===
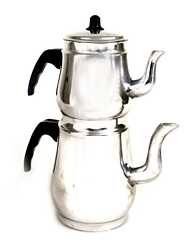
A çaydanlık

Turkish samovars are popular souvenirs among tourists, and charcoal burning samovars are still popular in rural areas. However, in modern homes, they have been replaced with the çaydanlık (lit. 'teapot'), a metal teapot with a smaller teapot on top taking the place of the cap of the lower one. To make Turkish tea, the lower part is used to boil the water and the upper part, called demlik is used for concentrated tea. Tea is poured first from the demlik and then diluted to the desired level with plain boiling water from the lower tea kettle. The body is traditionally made of brass or copper, occasionally also silver or gold, but çaydanlık are now also made from stainless steel, aluminium, or ceramics with plastic, steel or aluminium handles.

== Gallery ==
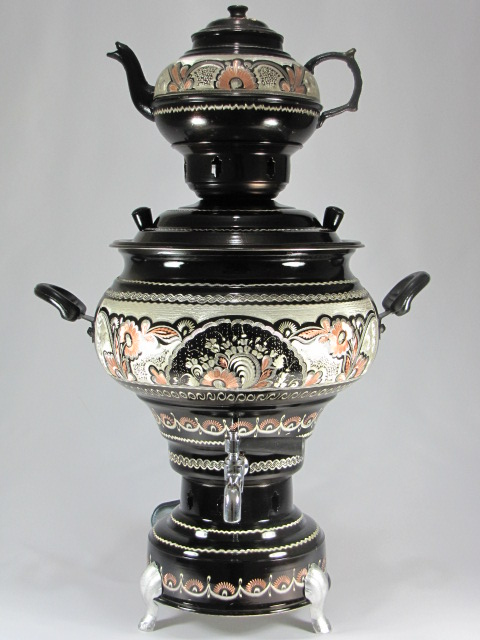

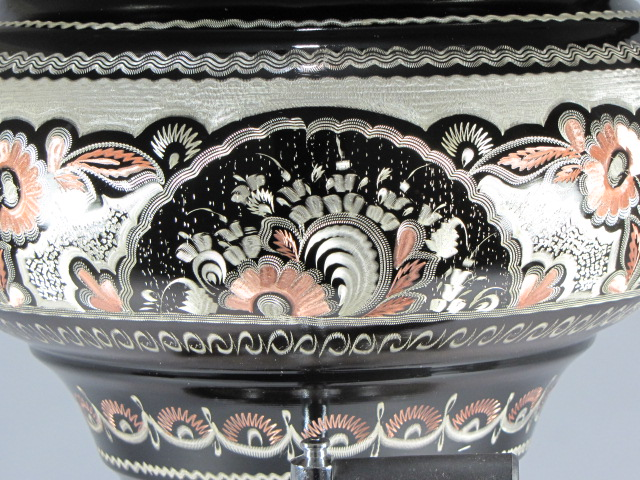

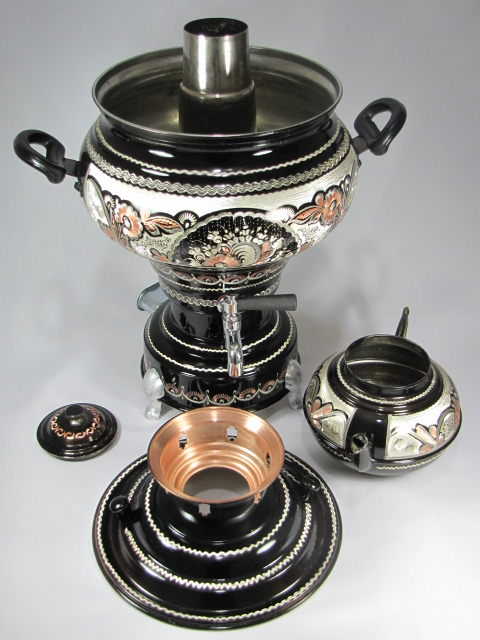

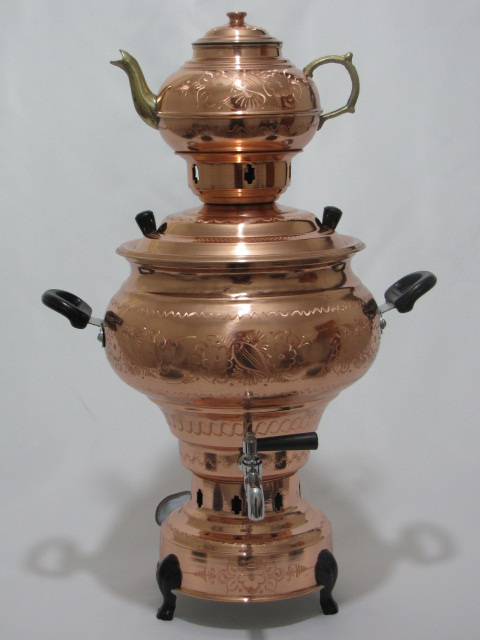

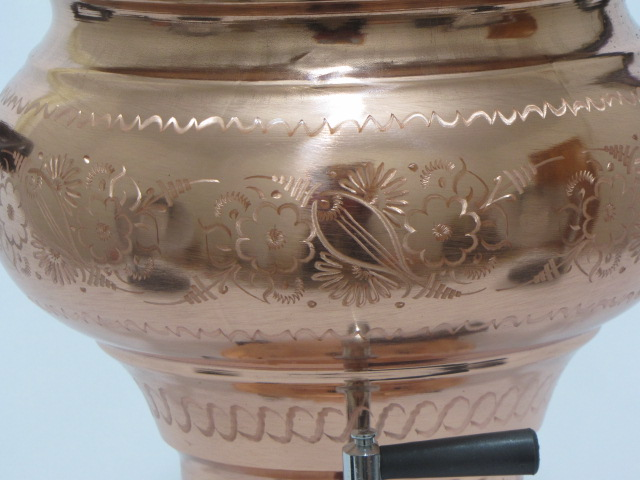

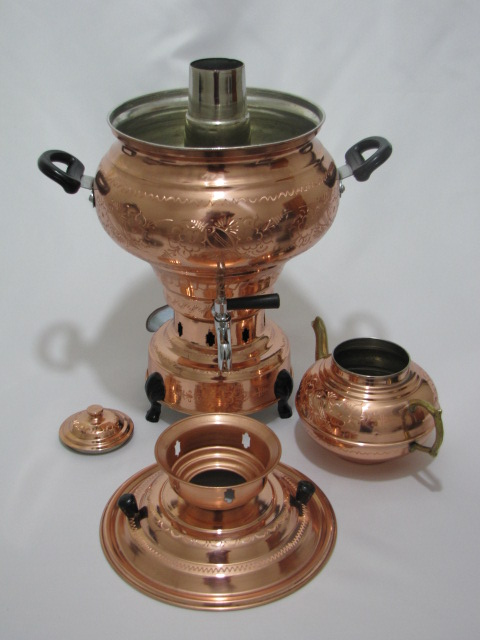

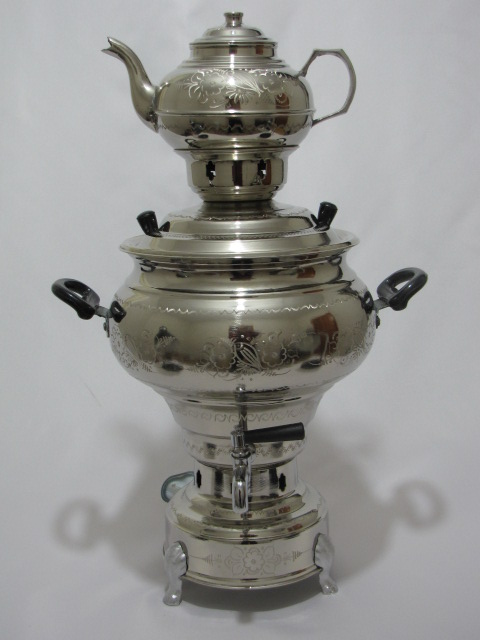

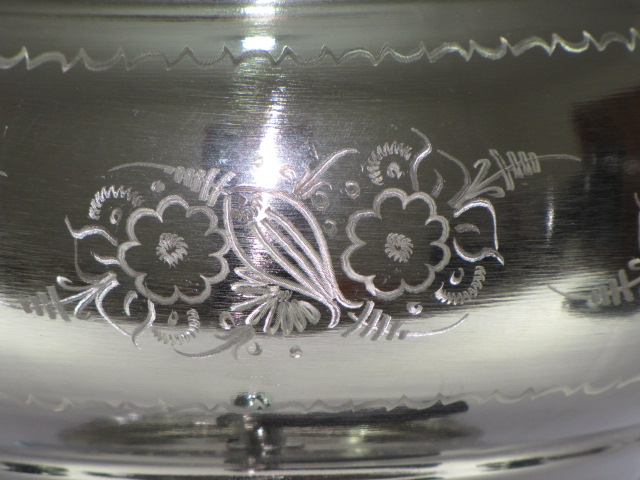

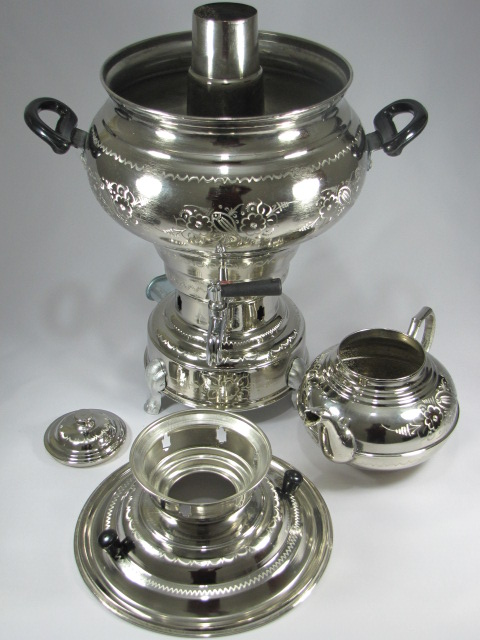

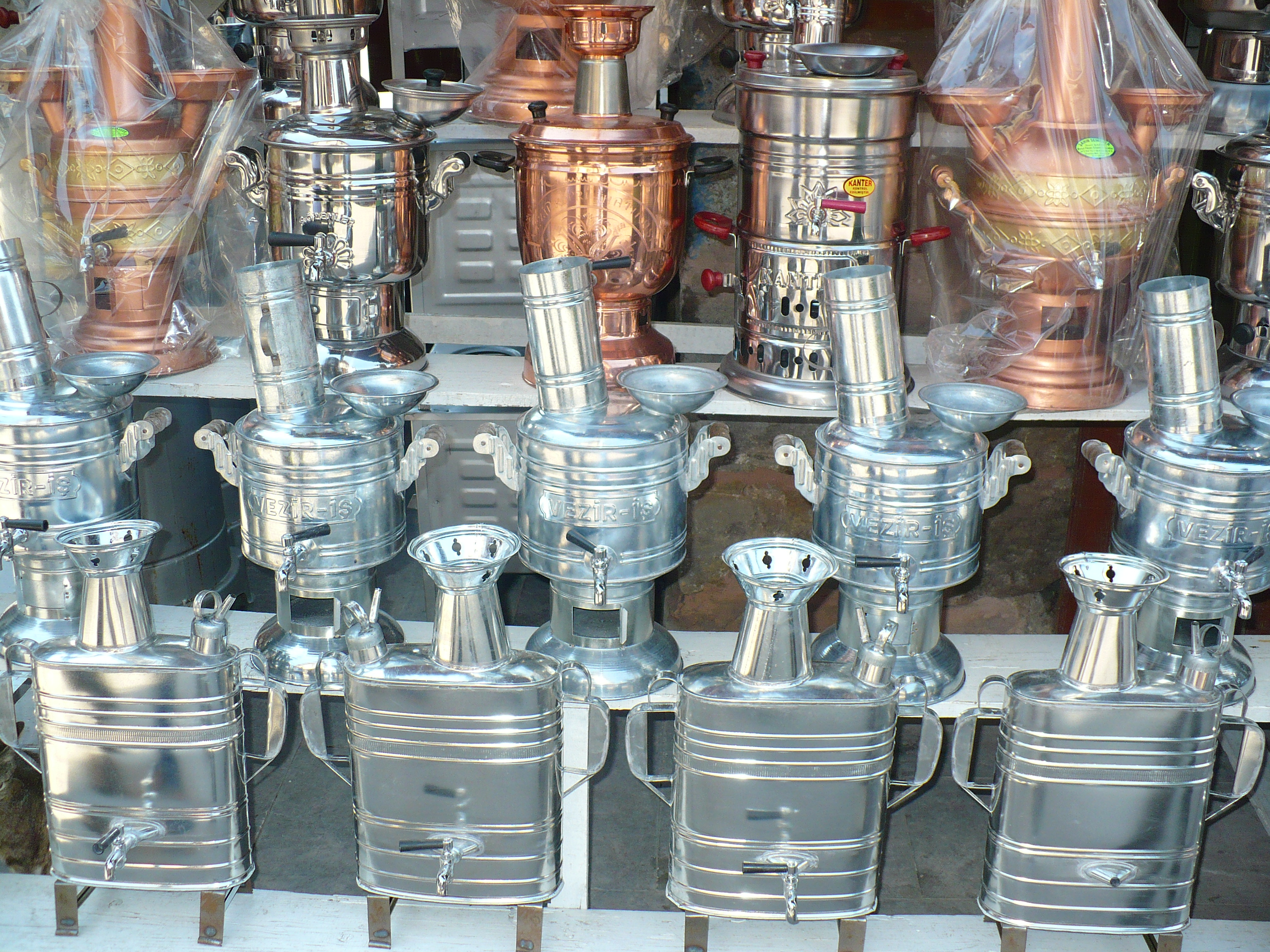

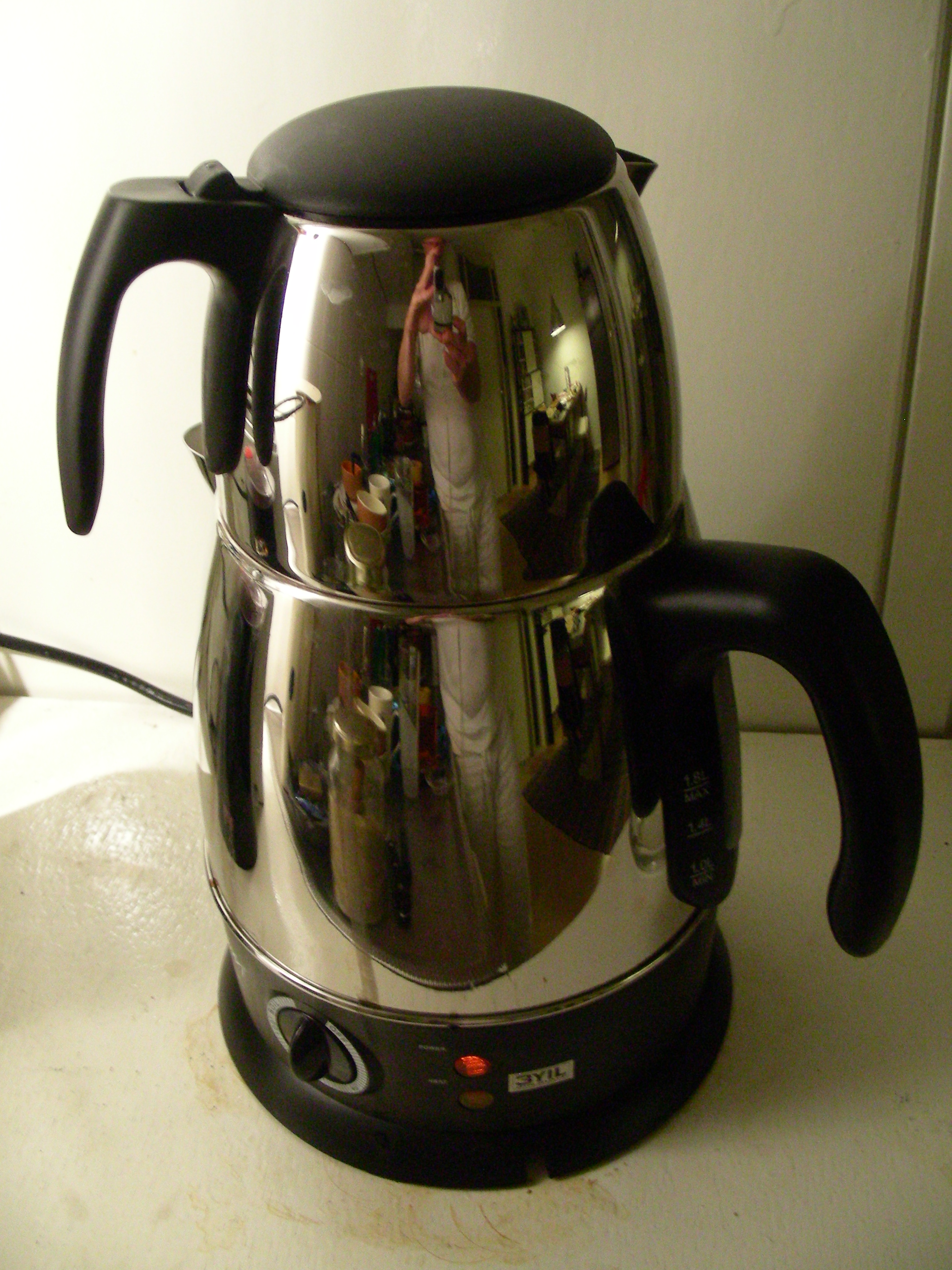

== See also ==
- Authepsa
- Kelly Kettle
- Percolator
- Varsho samovars of Borujerd, Iran.
