= Teruchiyo Takamiya =

Japanese equestrian

Personal information
- Nationality: Japanese
- Born: 18 February 1942 (age 83)

Sport
- Sport: Equestrian

Teruchiyo Takamiya (born 18 February 1942) is a Japanese equestrian. He competed in the team jumping event at the 1972 Summer Olympics.
