= Authepsa =

Vessel used for heating water

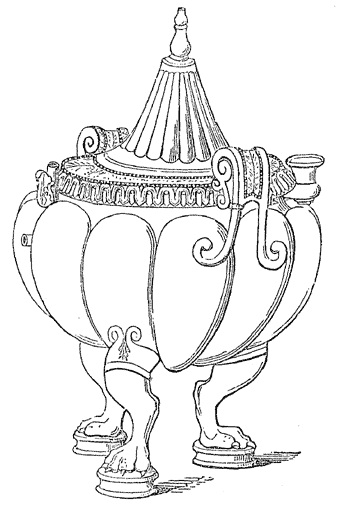
A possible authepsa (the first cut from A Dictionary of Greek...)

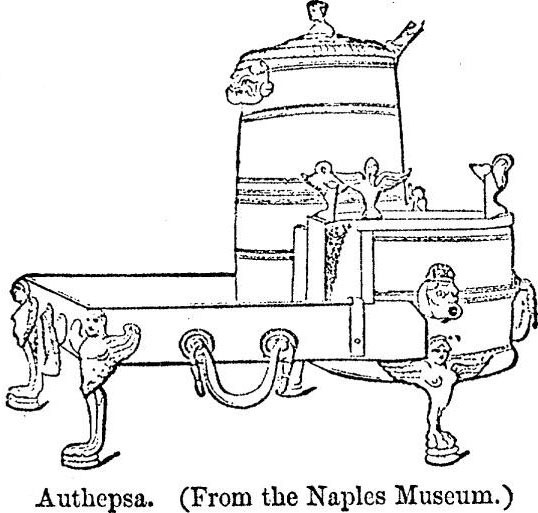
Aauthepsa (the second cut from A Dictionary of Greek...)

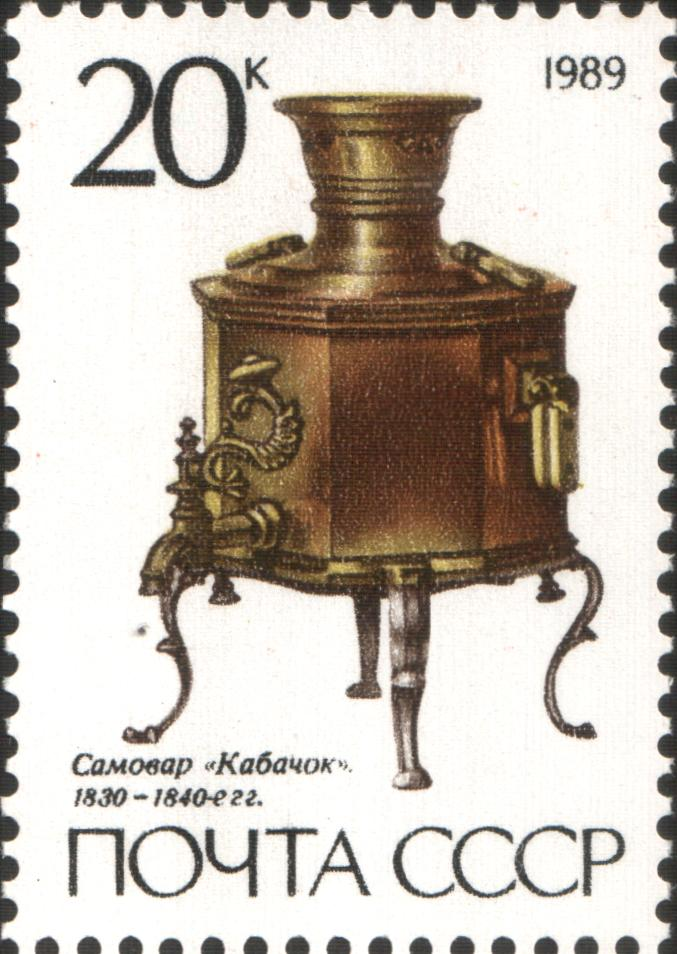
An 1800s samovar, for comparison

In classical antiquity, an authepsa or autepsa (Ancient Greek: αὐθέψης, authépsēs; from αὐτός + ἕψω, "self-boiling", "self-cooking") was a vessel used for water heating. Basically, it was a vase with a central tube used to keep coals.

Dictionary of Greek and Roman Antiquities describes it as follows:

AUTHEPSA (αὐθέψης), or “self-boiler”, was a vessel used for heating water or keeping it hot. As is well known, both hot and cold water were served by the attendants at well-appointed Roman tables (calidae gelidaeque minister, Juv. 5.63, with Mayor's note). For this purpose vessels were used which cannot have differed much in construction from our modern tea-urns (Böttiger, Sabina, 2.30), and like them might be made of costly materials and in artistic designs (authepsa illa, quam tanto pretio nuper mercatus est, Cic. pro Rose. Amer. 46.133; authepsas argenteas, Lamprid. Heliog. 19).

Many ingenious contrivances for economical and portable cooking have been found at Pompeii and Herculaneum, and are now in the Museo Nazionale (formerly Borbonico) at Naples. It is probable, however, that the authepsa, unlike the aënum and caccabus, was not used for cooking; and it is rather to be identified with a utensil from the same collection (Mus. Borbon. vol. iii. pl. 63) in the first cut above. This vessel is in bronze, and of very tasteful workmanship: the cylinder in the centre was filled with charcoal, and has a grating which allowed the air to enter and the ashes to escape. The second cut, from Mus. Borbon. vol. v. pl. 44, shows another of more elaborate construction.

The Russian samovar is likewise explained to mean “self-boiler”, and appears to be little different from the authepsa.

Harper's Dictionary of Classical Literature and Antiquities describes it as follows:

Authepsa (αὐθέψης), which literally means “self-boiling” or “self-cooking,” was the name of a vessel which was used for heating water, or for keeping it hot. Its form was not greatly different from that of our modern tea-urn, as shown by the annexed illustration. Cicero speaks of authepsae among other costly Corinthian and Delian vessels. In later times they were made of silver.
