= Åke Hultberg =

Swedish equestrian

Personal information
- Nationality: Swedish
- Born: 29 November 1949 (age 75); Strömsholm, Sweden

Sport
- Sport: Equestrian

Åke Hultberg (born 29 November 1949) is a Swedish equestrian. He competed in the individual jumping event at the 1972 Summer Olympics.
