= Sándor Bognár =

Hungarian equestrian

Personal information
- Nationality: Hungarian
- Born: 15 November 1950 (age 74); Budapest, Hungary

Sport
- Sport: Equestrian

Sándor Bognár (born 15 November 1950) is a Hungarian equestrian. He competed in the team jumping event at the 1972 Summer Olympics.
