= Varshosazi =

Iranian traditional metal working with nickel silver

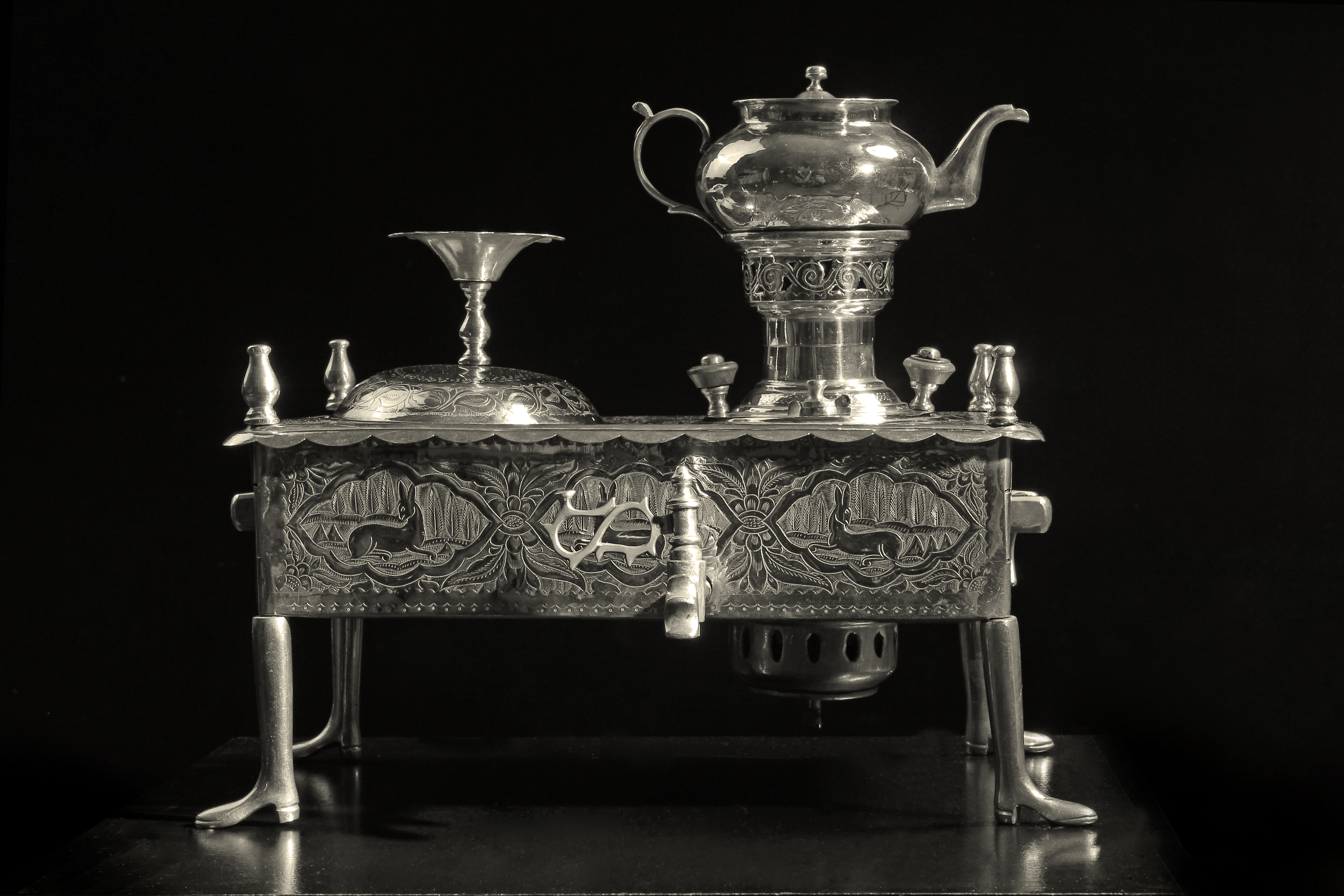
Art Varsho work combining brazier and samovar, by Reza Raufian, Borujerd

Varshosazi, or varsho-sazi (Persian: ورشوسازی) is the Iranian artisan handicraft of producing metal objects using nickel silver alloy (Persian: ورشو, romanized: varsho; also known as German silver), started in the Qajar era. This craft was heavily influenced by the Russian tea service containers, such as samovars.

The varshosazi is a type of metalsmithing using nickel silver alloy, and is related to other metalsmithing professions. It was widespread in some cities of Iran during the Qajar and Pahlavi periods; and today, limited varsho workshops are still operating around the country especially in Borujerd in the Lorestan province of Iran.

== History ==
The art of nickel silver repoussé and chasing in Iran reaches its highest point from the Qajar era through the Pahlavi dynasty. During the Qajar period, German Silver (nickel silver) sheets were imported from Germany and Poland and therefore, the alloy was named varsho referring to the city of Warsaw, the capital of Poland. Artisans from Isfahan, Borujerd and Dezful first learned to produce repoussé and chasing works by observing samovars and other Russian tea service products in the 19th century. The craftsmen were selected from coppersmith market and they learned to make utensils by shaping nickel silver and brass sheets; however, nickel silver was more popular because of its durability and the craftsmen could produce different objects for families and industry.

During the 20th century, producing metal crafts using nickel silver and brass was practiced widely in Iranian cities. In recent decades, the art of varshosazi has been disappeared in almost all Iranian cities except in Borujerd and Dezful. Beside the introduction of modern utensils, a considerable reduction on importing nickel silver sheets was a main reason for the decline.

== Varshosazi in Borujerd ==
The city of Borujerd is known as the main center of varsho art and crafting in Iran. It is the only city that still has a number of workshops, museums, and artists active in this field. The history of varshosazi in Borujerd dates back to the Qajar period and were practiced widely in the city and the old bazaar of Borujerd which had specific sections for metalworking. The city has been named as the national city of varsho which indicates its position in this area. There is also ongoing attempts to register the 'art of varsho of Borujerd' as a world heritage.

== Products ==
Kitchenware plates and cutlery are popular utensils produced in varshosazi workshops. Teapots, teacups, forks, knives, spoons, sugar holders, small and large trays, water jars and rose water splinters are some examples of varsho products. Varsho samovars, however are considered as one of the most popular crafts in close relation with varshosazi art and crafting.

== See also ==
- Iranian handicrafts
- Coppersmith
