= Damman (surname) =

Damman is a surname. Notable people with the surname include:

- Adrian Damman (died 1605), Dutch diplomat and author
- Carlo Damman (born 1993), Belgian footballer
- James Damman (1933–2011), American politician
- Jean Damman (born 1949), Belgian equestrian
- Percy Damman (1876–1970), Australian rules footballer

== See also ==
- Damian (surname)
