= Marc Deuquet =

French equestrian

Personal information
- Nationality: French
- Born: 16 October 1933
- Died: 18 December 2009 (aged 76)

Sport
- Sport: Equestrian

Marc Deuquet (16 October 1933 – 18 December 2009) was a French equestrian. He competed in the team jumping event at the 1972 Summer Olympics.
