= Yury Zyabrev =

Soviet equestrian

Personal information
- Nationality: Soviet
- Born: 2 April 1947
- Died: 11 November 2006 (aged 59)

Sport
- Sport: Equestrian

Yury Zyabrev (2 April 1947 – 11 November 2006) was a Soviet equestrian. He competed in the team jumping event at the 1972 Summer Olympics.
