= Françoise Thiry =

Belgian equestrian

Personal information
- Nationality: Belgian
- Born: 28 June 1945 (age 79)

Sport
- Sport: Equestrian

Françoise Thiry (born 28 June 1945) is a Belgian equestrian. She competed in the team jumping event at the 1972 Summer Olympics.
