= César Batista =

Portuguese sports shooter

Personal information
- Full name: César Silva Batista
- Born: 6 October 1928 Fundão, Portugal

Sport
- Sport: Sports shooting

César Batista (born 6 October 1928) is a Portuguese former sports shooter. He competed at the 1960 Summer Olympics and the 1972 Summer Olympics.
