= Lisitsyn family =

Russian family of the first documented samovar-makers

The Lisitsyn family (Russian: Лисицыны) was a family of metalworkers and businessmen, and the first documented manufacturers of Samovars, living in the city of Tula in the Empire of Russia, during the 18th and 19th centuries.

== Notable members ==
Fyodor Ivanovich Lisitsyn (Russian: Фёдор Иванович Лисицын) was a progenitor of the dynasty, a weapons-maker and metalworker at his own brass factory in Tula.

Ivan Fyodorovich Lisitsyn (Russian: Иван Фёдорович Лисицын) and Nazar Fyodorovich Lisitsyn (Russian: Назар Фёдорович Лисицын) were the two sons of Fyodor Lisitsyn. From their childhood they were engaged in metalworking at their family's factory. In 1778 they made a samovar, and the same year Nazar Lisitsyn registered the first samovar-making factory in Russia. They may not have been the inventors of samovar, but they were the first historically recorded and documented samovar-makers, and their various and beautiful samovar designs became very influential throughout the later history of samovar-making.

Nikita Nazarovich Lisitsyn (Russian: Никита Назарович Лисицын) was a son of Nazar Lisitsyn who inherited the samovar factory in 1823. That year they produced 423 samovars. Ten years later the production was about 625 samovars a year, but by 1853 it had fallen to 315.

Nikita Nikitich Lisitsyn (Russian: Никита Никитич Лисицын) was a son of Nikita Nazarovich Lisitsyn and the next owner of Lisitsyn factory. He had a great success with his samovars at the pan-Russia Fair in Nizhny Novgorod and managed to sell much of the production to Bukhara and Khiva in Central Asia, where sphere-shaped samovars had become popular. In 1856 Nikita Lisitsyn received a medal and a kaftan in recognition of the quality of his samovars. In 1863 Lisitsyn participated in an exhibition, organised on the arrival of a son of Alexander II of Russia to Tula. After that time the history of the Lisitsyn family is unknown.

== See also ==
- Samovar
