= Mário Ribeiro =

Portuguese sports shooter (1935–2021)

Personal information
- Nationality: Portuguese
- Born: 7 April 1935
- Died: 27 July 2021 (aged 86)

Sport
- Country: Portugal
- Sport: Sports shooting

Mário Ribeiro (7 April 1935 – 27 July 2021) was a Portuguese sports shooter. He competed in two events at the 1972 Summer Olympics.
