= Alberto Matos =

Portuguese sprinter (1945–2021)

Personal information
- Full name: Alberto Jorge Rodrigues de Matos
- Nationality: Portuguese
- Born: 26 August 1945 Lisbon, Portugal
- Died: 28 January 2021 (aged 75)

Sport
- Sport: Sprinting
- Event: 4 × 400 metres relay

Alberto Jorge Rodrigues de Matos (26 August 1945 – 28 January 2021) was a Portuguese sprinter. He competed in the men's 4 × 400 metres relay at the 1972 Summer Olympics.
