= Barbara Barone =

Chilean equestrian

Personal information
- Nationality: Chilean
- Born: 21 August 1943 (age 82)

Sport
- Sport: Equestrian
Medal record
Equestrian
Representing Chile
Pan American Games
Bronze medal – third place	1971 Cali	Team jumping

Barbara Barone (born 21 August 1943) is a Chilean equestrian. She competed in the team jumping event at the 1972 Summer Olympics.
