= Ákos Ajtony =

Hungarian equestrian (1944–2017)

Personal information
- Nationality: Hungary
- Born: 21 July 1944 Debrecen, Hungary
- Died: 12 February 2017 (aged 72)
- Height: 1.70 m (5 ft 7 in)
- Weight: 65 kg (143 lb)

Sport
- Sport: Equestrianism

Ákos Ajtony (21 July 1944 – 12 February 2017) was a Hungarian equestrian, regarded as one of the most successful Hungarian show jumpers of the twentieth century. He competed in the 1972 Summer Olympics.

== Early life and education ==
Ajtony was born in Debrecen in 1944. He started riding horses at an early age, and at the age of 16 he became a member of the youth national team.

== Career ==
Ajtony placed seventh with his team at the 1960 European Youth Championships in Venice and went on to win the Hungarian show jumping championship nine times. In 1971, he finished eighth at the European Championships, followed by a 13th-place finish at the 1972 Munich Olympics. Beginning in 1977, he trained the Honvéd pentathlon athletes for eight years, coaching future Olympic gold medalists János Martinek, László Fábián, and Attila Mizsér. Ajtony later served as a professional leader and national coach for Hungary's pentathlon team at two Olympic Games. In recognition of his achievements, he was awarded the Count István Széchenyi Memorial Medal and the 1st degree of the Hungarian Sport Award.

== Horses ==
- Őzike
- Terike
- Bálvány
- Kabala
