= Fernando Silva (sprinter) =

Portuguese sprinter

Personal information
- Nationality: Portuguese
- Born: 10 January 1952 (age 74)

Sport
- Sport: Sprinting
- Event: 400 metres

Fernando Silva (born 10 January 1952) is a Portuguese sprinter. He competed in the men's 400 metres at the 1972 Summer Olympics.
