= Vladimir Lisitsin =

Soviet footballer

Personal information
- Full name: Vladimir Fyodorovich Lisitsin
- Date of birth: 20 August 1938
- Place of birth: Semipalatinsk, USSR
- Date of death: 8 August 1971 (aged 32)
- Place of death: Semipalatinsk, USSR
- Height: 1.82 m (6 ft 0 in)
- Position: Goalkeeper

Youth career
- CDSA Moscow

Senior career*
Years	Team	Apps	(Gls)
1957–1958	CSK MO Moscow	0	(0)
1959	FC Dynamo Moscow	0	(0)
1960	FC Spartak Moscow	0	(0)
1960–1963	FC Kairat	110	(0)
1964–1965	FC Spartak Moscow	20	(0)
1966	FC Kairat	23	(0)
1967–1970	FC Spartak Moscow	16	(0)
1971	FC Spartak Semipalatinsk		

International career
1964	USSR	1	(0)

Managerial career
- 1971: FC Spartak Semipalatinsk (assistant)
- * Club domestic league appearances and goals

Vladimir Fyodorovich Lisitsin (Russian: Владимир Фёдорович Лисицин; 20 August 1938 – 8 August 1971) was a Soviet football player.

== Honours ==
- Soviet Top League winner: 1969.
- Soviet Cup winner: 1965.

== International career ==
Lisitsin played his only game for USSR on 20 May 1964 in a friendly against Uruguay.
