= Pál Széplaki =

Hungarian equestrian

Personal information
- Nationality: Hungarian
- Born: 3 February 1945 (age 80); Budapest, Hungary

Sport
- Sport: Equestrian

Pál Széplaki (born 3 February 1945) is a Hungarian equestrian. He competed in the individual jumping event at the 1972 Summer Olympics.
