= André Antunes =

Portuguese sports shooter (1923–2002)

Personal information
- Born: 23 June 1923 Tinalhas, Castelo Branco, Portugal
- Died: 22 September 2002 (aged 79)

Sport
- Sport: Sports shooting

André Antunes (23 June 1923 – 22 September 2002) was a Portuguese sports shooter. He competed at the 1960 Summer Olympics and the 1972 Summer Olympics.
