= Percy Damman =

Australian rules footballer

Personal information
- Full name: Percy Charles George Damman
- Born: 7 May 1876; South Yarra, Victoria
- Died: 28 February 1970 (aged 93); Melbourne, Victoria
- Original team: Melbourne Grammar

Playing career^{1}
Years	Club	Games (Goals)
1898	St Kilda	7 (0)
- ^{1} Playing statistics correct to the end of 1898.

Percy Charles George Damman (7 May 1876 – 28 February 1970) was an Australian rules footballer who played with St Kilda in the Victorian Football League (VFL).
