= Ann Moore (equestrian) =

British equestrian

Medal record

Equestrian

Olympic Games
Silver medal – second place	1972 München	Individual jumping

Ann Elizabeth Moore (born August 20, 1950, in Birmingham, England), was a member of the 1972 Olympic Equestrian team from Great Britain winning the individual jumping silver medal, on her horse Psalm. She was the second woman to win an individual medal in her sport at the Olympics, following Marion Coakes, who, riding Stroller, won a silver medal for Great Britain in the same event four years previously at the Mexico Olympics. Ann Moore was the last British rider to win an individual show jumping medal in the Olympics until Nick Skelton won gold in 2016. Moore was part of the British team that finished fourth in the team event. She retired from international showjumping in 1974 aged 23.

Moore's wins included the Queen Elizabeth II Gold Cup (1972) and individual gold medals at the Women's European Championships in 1971 and 1973.
