= Aleksandr Nebogov =

Soviet equestrian

Personal information
- Nationality: Soviet
- Born: 3 March 1949 (age 77)

Sport
- Sport: Equestrian

Aleksandr Nebogov (born 3 March 1949) is an Armenian former equestrian who competed for the Soviet Union. He competed in two events at the 1972 Summer Olympics. A Master of Sports of the USSR, he won multiple medals, including gold, at the USSR Equestrian Championships.
