= Viktor Lisitsyn =

Soviet equestrian

Personal information
- Nationality: Soviet
- Born: 17 October 1926
- Died: 20 December 1976 (aged 50)

Sport
- Sport: Equestrian

Viktor Lisitsyn (17 October 1926 – 20 December 1976) was a Soviet equestrian. He competed in the individual jumping event at the 1972 Summer Olympics.
