= Elisa Pérez de las Heras =

Mexican equestrian

Personal information
- Nationality: Mexican
- Born: 10 June 1947 (age 79)

Sport
- Sport: Equestrian
Medal record
Equestrian
Representing Mexico
Pan American Games
Gold medal – first place	1971 Cali	Individual jumping
Silver medal – second place	1971 Cali	Team jumping

Elisa Pérez de las Heras (born 10 June 1947) is a Mexican equestrian. She competed in two events at the 1972 Summer Olympics.
