= Jean Damman =

Belgian equestrian

Personal information
- Nationality: Belgian
- Born: 17 October 1949 (age 75)

Sport
- Sport: Equestrian

Jean Damman (born 17 October 1949) is a Belgian equestrian. He competed in two events at the 1972 Summer Olympics.
