= Carlos Campos (equestrian) =

Portuguese equestrian (1931–2023)

Personal information
- Nationality: Portuguese
- Born: 26 November 1931; Rio de Moinhos, Portugal
- Died: November 2023 (aged 91)

Sport
- Sport: Equestrian

Carlos Campos (26 November 1931 – November 2023) was a Portuguese equestrian. He competed in two events at the 1972 Summer Olympics. Campos died in November 2023, at the age of 91.
