= Vasco Ramires Sr. =

Portuguese equestrian

Personal information
- Nationality: Portuguese
- Born: 10 July 1939; Coimbra, Portugal
- Died: 21 January 2012 (aged 72)

Sport
- Sport: Equestrian

Vasco Ramires Sr. (10 July 1939 – 21 January 2012) was a Portuguese equestrian. He competed in two events at the 1972 Summer Olympics.
