= Francisco Caldeira =

Portuguese equestrian

Personal information
- Nationality: Portuguese
- Born: 11 October 1948 (age 76)

Sport
- Sport: Equestrian

Francisco Caldeira (born 11 October 1948) is a Portuguese equestrian. He competed in two events at the 1972 Summer Olympics.
