= Equestrian events at the Summer Olympics =

- IOC Code: EQU
- Governing body: FEI
- Events: 6 (mixed)

Summer Olympics
- 1896; 1900; 1904; 1908; 1912; 1920; 1924; 1928; 1932; 1936; 1948; 1952; 1956; 1960; 1964; 1968; 1972; 1976; 1980; 1984; 1988; 1992; 1996; 2000; 2004; 2008; 2012; 2016; 2020; 2024; 2028; 2032
- Medalists

Equestrian sports were first included in the Olympic Games in the Summer Olympics of 1900 in Paris. They were again included in 1912, and have been included in every subsequent edition of the Games. Currently, the Olympic equestrian disciplines are dressage, eventing, and show jumping. In each discipline, both individual and team medals are awarded. Since the XV Olympiad in Helsinki in 1952, women and men compete on equal terms.

It is the only Olympic event that involves animals. The horses are considered to be athletes as much as the riders.

The international governing body for equestrian sports is the Fédération Équestre Internationale. The first Olympics held under its authority were in 1924. Since that time, Germany has established itself as the leading power in equestrian competitions.

== Summary of the Games ==
Games	Year	Events	Best Nation
1			
2	1900	5	Belgium (1)
3			
4	1908	1	Great Britain (1)
5	1912	5	Sweden (1)
6			
7	1920	7	Sweden (2)
8	1924	5	Sweden (3)
9	1928	6	Netherlands (1)
10	1932	5	France (1)
11	1936	6	Germany (1)
12			
13			
14	1948	6	France (2)
15	1952	6	Sweden (4)
16	1956	6	Sweden (5)
17	1960	5	Australia (1)
18	1964	6	United Team of Germany (1)
19	1968	6	Great Britain (2)
20	1972	6	West Germany (1)
21	1976	6	West Germany (2)
22	1980	6	Soviet Union (1)
23	1984	6	United States (1)
24	1988	6	West Germany (3)
25	1992	6	Germany (2)
26	1996	6	Germany (3)
27	2000	6	Netherlands (2)
28	2004	6	United States (2)
29	2008	6	Germany (4)
30	2012	6	Great Britain (3)
31	2016	6	Germany (5)
32	2020	6	Germany (6)
33	2024	6	Germany (7)
34	2028	6	

== History ==
=== Paris Games ===
Equestrian events were first held at the 1900 Paris Olympic Games. Five different equestrian events were held: individual jumping, high jump, long jump, hacks and hunter combined, and mail coach.

The polo competition consisted of 4 mixed teams made up of players from Britain, France, Mexico, Spain, and the United States.

Grand Prix Jumping, which was similar to today's show jumping event, had 45 competitors entered, though only 37 competed. The first and second place was taken by riders from Belgium (1. Aimé Haageman on Benton, Illinois, 2. Georges van der Poële riding Winsor Squire), while a French rider, Louis de Champsavin, on his mount Terpsichore, got the third place.

The High Jump competition resulted in a tie between French rider Dominique Gardere on Canela and Italian Gian Giorgio Trissino on Oreste, with both of their horses clearing 1.85 meters, and the bronze was given to Constant van Langendonck of Belgium, whose mount, Extra Dry, cleared 1.70 meters. However, Constant van Langendonck and Extra Dry were able to clinch the gold in the Long Jump competition, clearing a distance of 6.10 meters. Trissino and Oreste won the silver, clearing 5.70 meters, and M. de Bellegarde of France won the bronze with the 5.30 meter jump by his mount Tolla.

=== Return of equestrian competition ===
Equestrian competition was dropped from the 1904 Olympic Games, and owed its return to Count Clarence von Rosen, Master of the Horse to the King of Sweden, for bringing it back. The 1906 IOC Congress agreed to his proposal to add dressage, eventing, and show jumping to the program of the upcoming 1908 Olympic Games in London. However, due to problems with the newly formed International Horse Show Committee, they were not introduced until the 1912 Games in Stockholm and only a polo event was held in 1908. These three disciplines have been held at every Summer Olympic Games since then.

=== Participation of non-officers and women ===
Until the 1952 Summer Olympics, only commissioned military officers and "gentlemen" were permitted to compete in the Olympic equestrian disciplines, which had the effect of excluding all women and all men serving in the military but not holding officers' commissions. An exception was the hacks and hunter combined event at the 1900 Olympics, in which three women competed.

In 1952, however, all men were permitted to compete in all equestrian disciplines, and women were permitted to compete in Dressage. Women were later permitted to compete in Jumping in 1956 and in Eventing in 1964. Since then, equestrianism has been one of the very few Olympic sports in which men and women compete with and directly against one another. In team competition, teams may have any blend of male and female competitors and are not required to have minimum numbers of either sex; countries are free to choose the best riders, regardless of gender.

=== Polo, driving and vaulting in the Olympics ===
Driving events were included in the inaugural 1900 Olympic Games.

Polo

Polo was also included in 1900 Games, but unlike driving it would be held an additional 4 times: at the 1908 London Games, the 1920 Antwerp Games, the 1924 Paris Games, and the 1936 Berlin Games. The 1908 Olympics had just 3 polo teams, all representing Great Britain. The 1920 Games included a team from Belgium, Great Britain, Spain, and the United States, with Great Britain again winning the gold medal. It was not until 1924, after Argentina sent a team to Paris, that the gold changed hands. Argentina also won gold at the 1936 Olympic Games.

Vaulting

Vaulting was only held once, at the 1920 Antwerp Games. Vaulting included both a team and an individual competition, with the entrants having to perform movements at the canter and at the halt, both with a saddle and bareback. Three nations sent teams: the gold medal-winning Belgium, France, and Sweden. The individual competition was again made up of competitors from only Belgium, France, and Sweden, with Belgium's M. Bouckaert winning gold medal, and the silver and bronze medals going respectively to France's M. Fields and M. Finet.

== Dressage in the Olympic Games ==
Dressage

Dressage has changed dramatically since the 1912 Olympics. The dressage horse no longer has to jump, but the test on the flat has become increasingly difficult, emphasizing the piaffe and the passage. Today's horses are specifically bred for dressage and have movement far more extravagant when compared to the horses of the early 20th century.

Only individual medals were awarded at the 1912, 1920, and 1924 Games, with team medals awarded at all Olympics following that point.

=== 1912 Stockholm Olympics ===
The 1912 Stockholm Olympics held the first Olympic dressage competition, featuring 21 riders from eight countries (Belgium, Denmark, France, Germany, Norway, Russia, Sweden, and the United States). Dressage horses were required to perform three tests: a test on the flat, a jumping test, and an obedience test.

The test on the flat could only be a maximum of ten minutes in length and was ridden in what is now called the "small arena," a 20 meter by 40 meter space. The difficulty was much less than it is today, similar to the USDF Fourth Level. The test, as it is today, scored each movement on a 0–10 scale. Required gaits included the "free" and "easy" walk, the "slow" and "extended" trot, and the "slow" and "extended" canter, all of which were to be performed on both reins. The horse also had to demonstrate "ordinary turns," small circles at the slow trot, 8-meter circles at the canter, figure-eights at the canter (both performing a flying change in the center, as well as without a flying change, the second circle being at counter canter), four or more flying changes on a straight line, turn on the haunches, and reinback. At this time, piaffe, passage, and all other haute ecole movements were not allowed (including the airs above the ground and the Spanish Walk). Extra points could be earned if the rider rode with both reins in one hand, especially if this were performed at the canter.

Additionally, all dressage horses were required to jump four obstacles which were a maximum of 1.1 meters high, and another fence with a 3-meter spread. They were then asked to perform an "obedience test," riding the horse near spooky objects.

Riders were required to wear informal uniform if they were military officers, or black or pink coats with silk hats if they were civilians. Horses had to be ridden in a double bridle, and martingales and bearing reins were prohibited.

=== 1920 Antwerp ===
17 riders from 5 countries participated in the dressage competition at the 1920 Antwerp Olympic Games. The test was now ridden required to be ridden from memory, and was held in a slightly larger arena (50m by 20m).

"Slow" was changed to "Collected" on the test sheet. Collected walk, trot, and canter were required, as was extended trot posting followed by collected trot sitting. A 5-loop serpentine was introduced, to be ridden at the canter, both with flying lead changes and with counter-canter loops. The counter change of hand with flying changes was also introduced, as was 4-, 3-, 2-, and 1-tempi changes. The halt was performed through the walk, and followed by a salute.

=== 1924 Paris ===
The Paris Games had 24 riders competing from nine countries. The test was similar to that used for the 1920 Games.

=== 1928 Amsterdam ===
The 1928 Olympics saw an increase in the time allowed for the test, from 10 up to 13 minutes. Riders lost 2 points per second over the time.

=== 1932 Los Angeles Olympics ===
The most significant change at the 1932 Los Angeles Games was the introduction of the piaffe and passage.

=== 1936 Berlin Olympics ===
29 riders from 11 countries participated. The test length increased again to 17 minutes.

The test included an 8-second halt, half-turns on the haunches at the walk, riding with reins in one hand at the trot, "ordinary" and extended trot while posting, a 5-loop canter serpentine with each loop 8-meters in diameter, the canter pirouette, four-, three-, two-, and one-tempi changes, and the piaffe and passage. The highest coefficient for the test was bending on two-tracks at the collected trot and collected canter.

=== 1948 London Olympics ===
19 riders from 9 countries competed. Due to World War II, there was not sufficient time to prepare the dressage horses for the 1948 Games. Therefore, piaffe and passage were not placed on the tests. However, half-pass, renvers, canter pirouettes, and tempi changes were included, with the highest coefficient on the one-tempis.

=== Later Olympic Games ===
Today, the format for the dressage competition begins with a Grand Prix test to determine the winners of the team competition. The top 25 competitors in the Grand Prix then perform a second test, the Grand Prix Special, which is shortened and emphasizes the piaffe and passage. The top 13 of this group then goes onto the Grand Prix Freestyle (first introduced at the 1996 Olympics), which is written by each individual rider according to strict guidelines, and set to music. These scores help determine the individual medalists.

The test has remained relatively unchanged, except for the fact that renvers is no longer included in the Grand Prix and Grand Prix Special Classes.

== Eventing in the Olympic Games ==
Eventing

Introduced in 1912, three-day eventing originally only allowed active military officers to compete, and only on mounts either owned by themselves or by their military branch.

=== 1912 Stockholm Olympics ===
The competition was held over 5 days. Day 1 was the Endurance Test, consisting of 55 km (34 mi) on roads (with a time allowed of 4 hours, giving a speed of approx. 230 meters per minute), immediately followed by a 5 km cross-country course at a speed of 333 meters per minute. Time penalties were given for exceeding the time allowed, but no bonus points were given for being fast.

Day 2 was a rest day, before the horses set off on the Speed Test on Day 3, over a steeplechase course that was 3.5 km with 10 plain obstacles, at 600 mpm.

Day 4 was the Jumping Test ("Prize Jumping"), which consisted of 15 obstacles, maximum 1.3 meters high and 3.0 meters wide.

Day 5 was the Dressage Test ("Prize Riding"), which was similar to the individual dressage test that year, except the horses were not required to do figure-eights, flying changes, or the jumping and obedience tests that were required of the dressage horses.

Horses had to carry at least 80 kg and had to be wearing a double bridle. Riders were required to be attired in informal uniform.

=== 1920 Antwerp Olympics ===
There were significant changes in the format for the 1920 Olympics, most notable was the removal of the dressage test. 25 riders from 8 nations competed.

Horses began on Day 1 with a 45 km roads and tracks test to be completed in 3.5 hours. This was followed by a 5 km cross-country test, with 18 obstacles between 1.1–1.15 meters high, with a time limit of 12.5 minutes.

Day 2 consisted of a second roads and tracks test that was 20 km, with a time limit of 1 hour. The horse was then examined by a vet, and eliminated if lame or too exhausted to continue. The horse then went on to do a 4,000 meter steeplechase at 550 mpm. Unlike the previous year, speed was rewarded, with riders earning 1/2-point if they rode it at 600 mpm and 1 point if it was ridden at 650 mpm (this system of bonus points was eliminated in 1971). They were penalized 1 point for every second under the time. A new rule was also instituted which eliminated riders after three refusals, run-outs, or falls.

The jumping test consisted of 18 obstacles, a maximum of 1.25 meters high, on a 1,150 meter course. There was a 3-minute time limit, again rewarding speed with an extra 1/2-point for every second under the time, adding 1/4-point for every second over. Unlike today's show jumping tests, some obstacles had to be cleared multiple times during the test, at a different part of the fence each time. Riders gained points for refusals, run-outs, falls, and going off-course.

The required weight was reduced to 75 kg, where it would remain for several decades. Riders could also wear dark or "pink" coats instead of informal uniform attire. All riders had to wear cream breeches and silk hats.

=== 1924 Paris Olympics ===
The 1924 Games again changed the format to what would be seen today. 44 competitors from 13 countries took part.

Dressage was held over two days due to the large number of entries. The test was now required to be held in a 20x60 meter arena, and a time limit was instituted (10-minute 30 seconds maximum). Riders had to demonstrate the walk, the "ordinary" (working) trot both rising and sitting, the "slow" (collected) trot, the extended trot, the "ordinary" and extended canter. They also had to show small circles, the halt, reinback, and counter-canter. There was new rule this year that required a double bridle but would not allow martingales, bandages, or bearing reins. Riders could now wear hunt caps in addition to silk hats.

The cross-country test on Day 3 was similar to what is now called the "long format" test, and was a true endurance test, taking 2 hours, 1 minute, and 47 seconds. It consisted of 5 phases. Phase A was a 7 km roads and tracks test at 240 mpm, followed by Phase B, a 4 km steeplechase at 550–600 mpm, then Phase C, a second roads and tracks at 240 mpm that was 15 km long. The horse then went on the 8 km cross-country test (Phase D) at a speed of only 450 mpm. Unlike today, the rider then had to complete a 2 km canter on the flat at 333 mpm (Phase E, which was abolished in 1967).

The 4th day held the jumping test.

=== 1928 Amsterdam Olympics ===
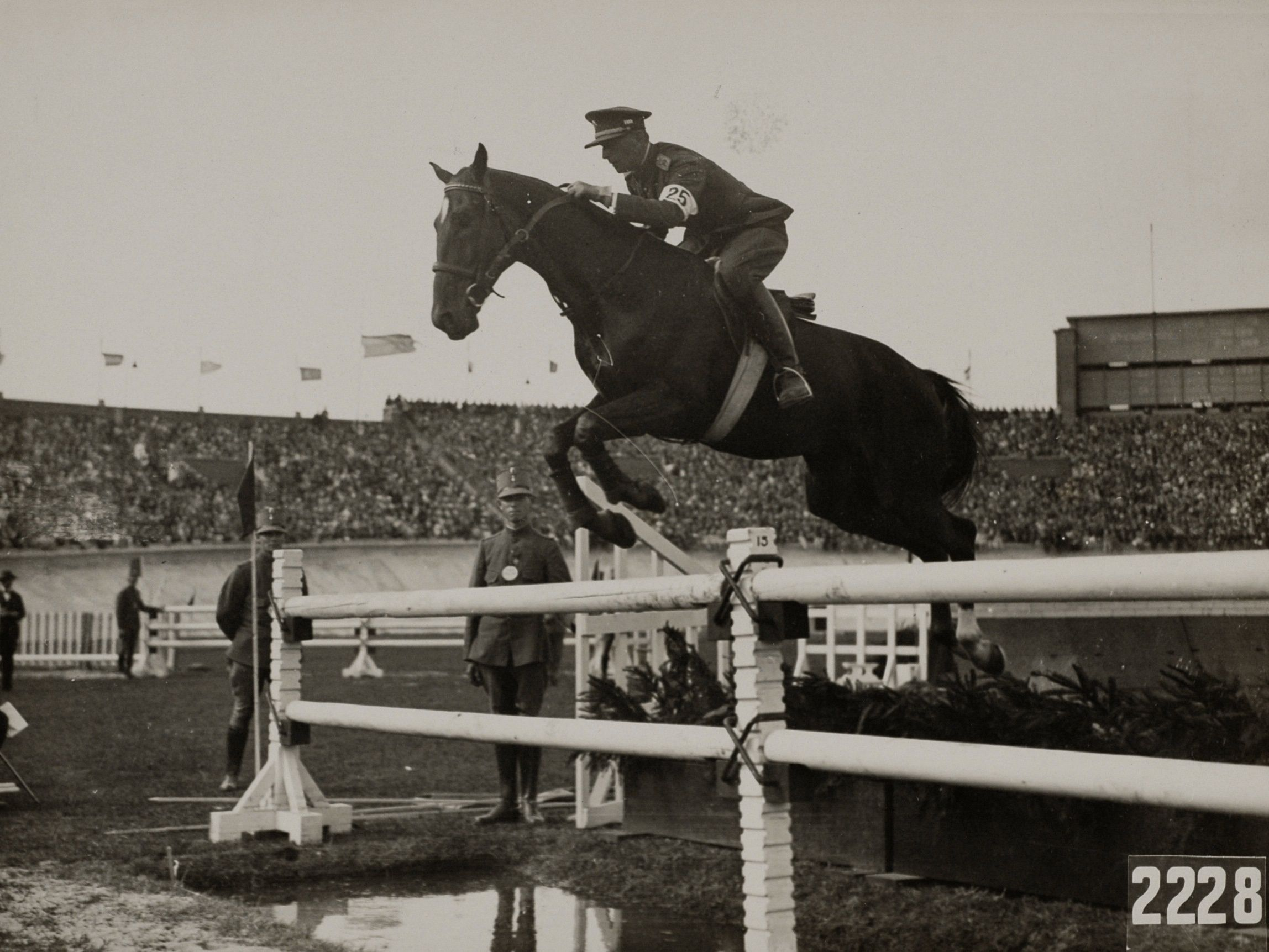
Olympic Games Amsterdam, Netherlands 1928: Czechoslovak rider František Ventura won gold in the jumping individual event.

This Olympic Games was similar to the 1924 Olympics. A few changes were made, however. In dressage, the time limit was raised to 11 minutes, and competitors lost 2 points for every second over this limit. Endurance day saw an increase in the steeplechase speed from 550 to 600 mpm. Stadium jumping rules changed to specify the course- 12 obstacles to be ridden at 375 mpm, with the competitor losing 1/2-point for every second over time.

The format and rules remained relatively unchanged through the 1932 Olympic Games.

=== 1936 Berlin Olympics ===
The Berlin Games saw new rules designed to help protect the horse, mostly regarding the use of performance-altering drugs, especially stimulants and sedatives. Additionally, horses that were exhausted or lame following the endurance test were to be eliminated.

The weight requirement of at least 165 lbs, previously required for all rides, was dropped for the dressage phase, although it remained for stadium jumping and the endurance test. Scoring of the Stadium phase was weighed to make it significantly less important than the Endurance test.

50 riders competed in the eventing competition, but only 27 finished, mostly due to one particular fence on cross-country (see Equestrian events at the 1936 Summer Olympics).

=== 1948 London Olympics ===
The 1948 Games had 46 entrants, including competitors from Argentina, Portugal, and Brazil. Dressage tests now included half-pass at the trot. The endurance test was reduced to 22 km of roads and tracks, a 3.5 km steeplechase, and 8 km on cross-country (a total of 33.5 km).

=== Olympics through the 1990s ===
Olympic Games from 1952 to 1996 saw few changes in format or rules. Dressage introduced the single flying change.

The Endurance test also saw some changes. Steeplechase speed increased to 690 mpm. Cross-country was shortened by 2 km and required 32–34 fences that were a maximum of 1.2 meters in height and was to be ridden at the heightened speed of 570 mpm. Additionally, the 75 kg required for jumping was reduced to 70 kg for the 1996 Games and abolished two years later.

Women were allowed to ride in equestrian events in 1952. However, it was not until Helena du Pont competed for the United States at the 1964 Tokyo Olympics that eventing saw its first woman representing her country.

The 1996 Games also provided a testing grounds for new methods of cooling the horses after cross-country, including misting fans, and added an additional hold during Phase C to ensure the horses were cooling properly. Also during this time was an extensive study performed on the event horses at the Games to study the effects of heat and different methods of cooling. These studies provided a great deal of valuable information, debunking several myths, and the results have been useful to horsemen outside of eventing as well. This was the first time where an extensive veterinary study was conducted in conjunction with the Games.

=== 2004 Athens Olympics ===
The traditional Endurance test, known as the "classic format," included roads and tracks (Phase A and C), steeplechase (Phase B), and cross-country (Phase D). At the 2004 Olympics, the "short format" was introduced, removing phases A, B, and C from the endurance day. This was intended to reduce the amount of space needed to hold an Olympic-level competition, thereby helping to ensure that the sport was not ousted by the IOC from the Olympics. This format has drawn criticism from various members of the sport but is now considered to be the "standard" competition format at all levels.

== Show jumping in the Olympic Games ==
Jumping

In 1900, show jumping allowed both military and non-military riders (and their mounts) to compete, excluding military school horses. Today, it is open to both sexes on any horse.

Courses have also changed considerably. Early fences were built more naturally, rather than the brightly colored poles that are today's standard. Fences were smaller, and courses were not as technical.

=== 1912 Stockholm Games ===
31 riders from 8 countries competed. Each team could have a team of 4 riders with 2 alternates (with the team scoring using only the top 3 riders), and enter 6 riders in the individual competition with 3 alternates.

The course consisted of 15 obstacles and 29 jumping efforts- as many of these obstacles were jumped more than once, which is no longer allowed today. The maximum height was 1.4 meters (4.7 feet), water could be 4 meters (7.3 feet) max in width. The course also included a ditch, stone wall, post-and-rail, brush, and triple-bars, and was ridden at a speed of 400 mpm.

Scoring was very different from today, with the riders trying to gain points. Each jump was worth 10-point, and riders could lose points for various disobediences and mistakes:

- Refusals:
  - -2 for the first,
  - -4 for the second,
  - -8 for the third,
  - elimination for the fourth
- Fall of horse and rider:
  - -4
- Fall of just the rider:
  - -6
- Tapping the fence by the horse:
  - -1
- Knocking down the fence:
  - -2 if with the hind legs,
  - -4 if by the forelegs or fore and hind legs
- Touching demarcation line of spread jump:
  - -1 if hind legs touch line,
  - -2 if forelegs touch line,
  - -2 if hind legs touch within the line,
  - -4 if forelegs touch within the line
- Over the time limit:
  - -2 for every 5 seconds over
- Off course:
  - elimination

Like eventing, all horses had to carry at least 165 lbs in weight. Riders were required to wear informal uniform if the rider was an officer, a black or "pink" coat with silk hat or hunt cap if a civilian.

=== 1920 Antwerp and 1924 Paris Olympics ===
The course at the 1920 Games was 800 meters in length with 14 obstacles, all of which were 1.3–1.4 meters high. The water was a maximum of 4 meters in width. 25 riders from 6 countries competed.

Changes in scoring included:

- Fall of both the horse and rider:
  - -8
- Fall of just the rider:
  - -4
- Knockdown:
  - by a foreleg −2,
  - by a hind leg −1.
- Demarcation line:
  - Touching the line was not penalized.
  - Within the line with a hind leg −1,
  - within the line with a front leg −2.
- Off-course:
  - -2

The 1924 Paris Olympics was similar to the Antwerp Olympics, except the course consisted of 15 obstacles. 43 competitors from 11 countries competed.

=== 1928 Amsterdam Olympics ===
46 riders from 16 nations competed over a 16-obstacle course.

Changes in scoring included:

- Going over the time limit:
  - -1/4 per second
- Refusal or run-out:
  - first disobedience −2,
  - second disobedience −6,
  - third disobedience elimination.
- Knockdown:
  - with foreleg −4,
  - with hind leg −2
- Demarcation line:
  - hind leg within the line −2,
  - foreleg within the line −4
- Fall of horse and rider:
  - -6
- Fall of just the rider:
  - -10
- Off course:
  - -2

=== 1932 Los Angeles Olympics ===
Only 11 riders from 4 nations competed (United States, Mexico, Japan, and Sweden), due to the state of the world economy, a continued shortage of quality horses, and the cost of transporting European horses to the United States. The 18-obstacle course consisted of 20 jumping efforts. Maximum height increased from 1.4 to 1.6 meters (5.3 feet). Maximum width of the water increased from 4 to 5 meters (16.5 feet).

=== 1936 Berlin and 1948 London Olympics ===
18 nations competed over a 17-obstacle course at the 1936 Games, and the gold and bronze medals were determined using a jump-off. The course had 20 efforts, including a narrow gate, open ditch, double oxer, and a wall.

All rules stayed the same except for:

- Refusal or disobedience:
  - first disobedience −3,
  - second −6,
  - third elimination
- Knockdown:
  - -4 (regardless of leg)
- Landing within the demarcation lines:
  - -4 (regardless of leg)

The 1948 London Olympics had 44 riders from 15 nations competing, including for the first time Brazil, Ireland, Denmark, and Finland.

=== Format, courses, and scoring today ===
The format of today's Olympic Show Jumping competition is over 4 rounds.

- Round 1: is the first qualifier for individual competition. Additionally, the top 3 scores (fewest points) for each team are tallied to determine the start order for the team competition. The course is held at a speed of 400 mpm.
- Round 2 (individual medal final): takes the top 30 riders following round 1. The riders again begin with zero penalties. Medals are given to the top three riders with the fewest penalties, and a jump-off is held between riders with any ties for the medals. In addition, Rounds 2 and 3 are used for the team competition, adding points to each rider's score. Scores of individual riders are tallied for Round 1 and 2, and the top 50 riders move onto Round 3.
- Rounds 3 and 4 (team competition): determine the team medals. There are three riders per team and each of the three scores counts toward the team score. The two rounds are held over different courses. The top 8 nations of Round 3 move onto the Team Medal Final (Round 4). The team with the fewest penalties gets the gold medal. If there is a tie for any medal, a jump-off is held for all members in the teams.

The maximum height allowed on today's course is 1.65 meters (5.6 feet), width is a maximum of 2 meters (6.7 feet) for oxers and 2.2 meters (7.2 feet) for triple bars. Water has increased in width to a maximum of 4.5 meters (14.9 feet). The total length is only 500–600 meters, shorter than the earlier years.

Scoring is simpler and has changed to a penalty system, with each rider incurring "faults." 4 faults are assessed for a knockdown or if the horse lands in the water or on its edge. The first disobedience incurs 3 faults and the second results in elimination. Fall of horse or rider also results in elimination. Elimination in the individual competition does not prevent a rider from competing in the team competition.

== Location of the equestrian events ==
Occasionally, the equestrian competitions have been held away from the main Games. This has occurred at the:

- 1956 Olympics: the equestrian events were held in Stockholm, Sweden, rather than Melbourne, Australia, due to Australia's strict quarantine requirements.
- 2008 Olympics: the equestrian events were held in Shatin, Hong Kong, rather than Beijing, the capital, due to the high levels of equine disease in Beijing. Hong Kong was chosen as the alternate site because it had high standards for quarantine of horses, and was therefore considered safe for the equine athletes. Additionally, there were already some existing facilities in the territory, which would reduce the cost to host the competition, and Hong Kong, due to its colonial past, has a history of horse racing.

== Rules ==
Age requirements

Riders are required by the Fédération Équestre Internationale to be a minimum of 16 years old to participate in dressage classes and 18 for show jumping and eventing due to the increased risk posed to both rider and mount. All horses must be at least 9. There is no maximum age.

Number of horses and riders

Quotas of horse/rider pairs vary between Games and between each discipline. Currently, each National Federation may enter a team of 4 riders on the jumping team (one of which is a reserve), 5 on the event team (no reserves), and 3 riders on the dressage team.

Drug rules

Due to a great deal of drug abuse, drug rules for horses were instituted at the 1972 Munich Olympics (although there was no testing at that Games). Currently, there are very strict rules regarding what drugs may be used on the equine athletes of equestrian competition.

Veterinary inspections

All horses at the Olympics must undergo a veterinary inspection before the Games to ensure they are in good health and not carrying any disease. Veterinary inspections may also occur throughout the Games.

== Medal table ==
Updated after the 2024 Summer Olympics

Rank	Nation	Gold	Silver	Bronze	Total
1	Germany	32	15	14	61
2	Sweden	18	13	14	45
3	France	15	16	14	45
4	Great Britain	15	12	18	45
5	United States	11	24	20	55
6	West Germany	11	5	9	25
7	Netherlands	10	13	5	28
8	Italy	7	9	7	23
9	Australia	6	5	4	15
9	Soviet Union	6	5	4	15
11	Switzerland	5	11	8	24
12	United Team of Germany	5	5	4	14
13	Belgium	5	2	7	14
14	New Zealand	3	2	5	10
15	Canada	2	2	3	7
16	Mexico	2	1	4	7
17	Poland	1	3	2	6
18	Spain	1	2	1	4
19	Austria	1	1	1	3
20	Brazil	1	0	2	3
21	Japan	1	0	1	2
22	Czechoslovakia	1	0	0	1
23	Denmark	0	5	2	7
24	Chile	0	2	0	2
25	Romania	0	1	1	2
26	Argentina	0	1	0	1
26	Bulgaria	0	1	0	1
26	Norway	0	1	0	1
29	Portugal	0	0	3	3
30	Saudi Arabia	0	0	2	2
31	Hungary	0	0	1	1
31	Ireland	0	0	1	1
Totals (32 entries)		159	157	157	473

=== Medals per year ===
Nation	00	08	12	20	24	28	32	36	48	52	56	60	64	68	72	76	80	84	88	92	96	00	04	08	12	16	20	24	28	Total
Argentina						–			–		–	–	1	–	–	–		–	–		–	–	–	–	–	–	–	–		1
Australia											–	3	1	1	–	1		–	–	2	1	2	–	1	–	–	–	–		11
Austria					–	–		1	–		–	–			–	–	1	–	–	1	–	–	–	–	–	–	–	–		3
Belgium	4		1	5	–	–		–			–	–			–	2		–	–	–	–	–	–	–	–	–	1	–		13
Brazil									–	–	–	–	–	–	–			–	–	–	1	1	1	–	–	–	–	–		3
Bulgaria					–	–		–		–	–	–			–		1			–		–	–	–	–	–	–	–		1
Canada										–	1	–	–	1	–	1		–	1	–	–	–	–	2	–	1	–	–		7
Czechoslovakia					–	1		–				–								–										1
Chile			–							2			–	–	–			–				–	–	–	–	–	–	–		2
Denmark			–		1	–		1	–	1	1	–			–	–		1	–	–		–	–	1	–	–	–	1		7
France	8		3	2	1	2	3	1	4	3	–	1	2	2	–	1		–	3	1	1	–	1	–	–	3	1	2		45
Germany			4			3		7		4										7	4	4	4	5	4	6	4	5		61
United Team of Germany											6	2	6																	14
Great Britain			–		–			1	1	1	3	1	1	4	3	–		3	3	–	–	1	3	2	5	3	5	5		45
Hungary						–		1			–	–			–		–			–	–	–	–		–	–	–	–		1
Italy	2			5	2	–		–	–	–	3	3	3	–	3	–	2	–	–	–	–	–	–	–	–	–	–	–		23
Japan						–	1	–		–	–	–	–	–	–	–		–	–	–	–	–	–	–	–	–	–	1		2
Mexico							–	–	4	–			–	–	–	–	3	–	–	–	–	–	–	–	–	–	–	–		7
Netherlands				–	2	4	2	1	–	–	–				–	–		–	–	3	3	4	1	2	4	–	1	1		28
New Zealand												–	–					1	2	2	3	1	–	–	1	–	–	–		10
Norway			–	–		1		–		–	–							–	–	–				–	–	–	–	–		1
Poland					1	2		1				–		–	–		2		–	–	–			–	–	–	–	–		6
Portugal					1	–		1	1	–	–	–	–		–				–	–	–	–	–	–	–	–	–	–		3
Romania								1		–	–	–					1								–	–	–	–		2
Saudi Arabia																						1	–	–	1	–	–	–		1
Soviet Union										–	–	1	2	2	2	–	8		–											15
Spain					–	1			1	–	–	–	–		–	–		–	–	–	–	–	2	–	–	–	–	–		4
Sweden			6	9	4	3	3	1	3	4	3	–	–		2	–		1	–	–	–	–	1	1	1	1	2	–		45
Switzerland					2	1		–	1	1	1	3	2	1	–	2		3	2	–	1	1	–	1	1	–	–	1		24
United States	–		1	–	1	–	5	1	3	2	–	1	1	3	3	4		5	2	2	4	3	5	3	–	3	2	1		55
West Germany														4	5	7		4	5											25

Note: Dark gray squares represent years in which the NOC either did not exist or did not compete in the equestrian portion of the Olympic Games.

== Events ==
Event	96	00	04	08	12	20	24	28	32	36	48	52	56	60	64	68	72	76	80	84	88	92	96	00	04	08	12	16	20	24	28	Years
Show jumping, individual	-	X	-	-	X	X	X	X	X	X	X	X	X	X	X	X	X	X	X	X	X	X	X	X	X	X	X	X	X	X	X	28
Show jumping, team	-	-	-	-	X	X	X	X	X	X	X	X	X	X	X	X	X	X	X	X	X	X	X	X	X	X	X	X	X	X	X	27
Eventing, individual	-	-	-	-	X	X	X	X	X	X	X	X	X	X	X	X	X	X	X	X	X	X	X	X	X	X	X	X	X	X	X	27
Eventing, team	-	-	-	-	X	X	X	X	X	X	X	X	X	X	X	X	X	X	X	X	X	X	X	X	X	X	X	X	X	X	X	27
Dressage, individual	-	-	-	-	X	X	X	X	X	X	X	X	X	X	X	X	X	X	X	X	X	X	X	X	X	X	X	X	X	X	X	27
Dressage, team	-	-	-	-	-	-	-	X	X	X	X	X	X	-	X	X	X	X	X	X	X	X	X	X	X	X	X	X	X	X	X	23
Events	0	5	0	0	5	7	5	6	6	6	6	6	6	5	6	6	6	6	6	6	6	6	6	6	6	6	6	6	6	6	6	

=== Past events ===
Event	96	00	04	08	12	20	24	28	32	36	48	52	56	60	64	68	72	76	80	84	88	92	96	00	04	08	12	16	20	24	28	Years
High jump	-	X	-	-	-	-	-	-	-	-	-	-	-	-	-	-	-	-	-	-	-	-	-	-	-	-	-	-	-	-	-	1
Long jump	-	X	-	-	-	-	-	-	-	-	-	-	-	-	-	-	-	-	-	-	-	-	-	-	-	-	-	-	-	-	-	1
Hacks and hunter	-	X	-	-	-	-	-	-	-	-	-	-	-	-	-	-	-	-	-	-	-	-	-	-	-	-	-	-	-	-	-	1
Mail coach	-	X	-	-	-	-	-	-	-	-	-	-	-	-	-	-	-	-	-	-	-	-	-	-	-	-	-	-	-	-	-	1
Vaulting, individual	-	-	-	-	-	X	-	-	-	-	-	-	-	-	-	-	-	-	-	-	-	-	-	-	-	-	-	-	-	-	-	1
Vaulting, team	-	-	-	-	-	X	-	-	-	-	-	-	-	-	-	-	-	-	-	-	-	-	-	-	-	-	-	-	-	-	-	1

== Nations ==
Nation	96	00	04	08	12	20	24	28	32	36	48	52	56	60	64	68	72	76	80	84	88	92	96	00	04	08	12	16	20	24	28	Years
Argentina								3			9	6	7	9	8	8	9	7		4			5	1	4	1	2	4	3	1		18
Australia													4	4	7	7	4	7		9	10	5	11	14	8	12	12	12	9	9		17
Austria							2	3		8	2		5	1			5	4	1	4	2	5	5	3	9	2	3	1	5	8		20
Azerbaijan																										1	1					2
Belarus																									1	3	2		3			4
Belgium		X			4	18	11	9		3			3	2			4	4		3	1	8	6	6	9	3	10	5	5	9		21
Bermuda																				1	2	3	1	1	1	1	1		1			9
Bolivia																1	1	1														3
Brazil											6	4	3	3	1	3	3			4	4	6	9	11	9	10	9	12	7	7		18
Bulgaria							2	3		3		3	4	5			4		11			1		3	1							11
Cambodia													2																			1
Canada												3	4	4	2	11	11	10		11	11	11	11	6	10	12	12	10	6	9		18
Chile					2							9			1	3	3			4				2		1	4	1	1	1		12
China																										6		1	6	2		4
Colombia																					4	3	2	1	1	1	2	2	1	1		10
Croatia																						1			1							2
Czech Republic																									1	1			5	2		4
Czechoslovakia							11	9		9				2								1										5
Denmark					4		1	3		4	6	5	6	4			3	3		3	4	7	3	6	5	4	4	4	5	5		21
Dominican Republic																												1	2	1		3
East Germany																7	7															2
Ecuador																				1							1	1	1	3		5
Egypt												3	3								1	1		1	1	1	1	1	3	1		11
Estonia																													1	1		2
Finland						1	1	1		1	5	5	7						2	1	4	1	1	3		1	2	1	1	5		18
France		X			4	24	12	9	3	9	8	9	8	7	7	7	10	9		11	11	12	14	10	11	6	10	12	9	9		26
Germany					13			8		9		8										12	16	14	13	12	13	12	9	9		13
Great Britain				3	4		6			6	6	6	8	10	8	10	11	11		11	12	12	15	14	11	12	13	12	9	9		23
Greece																								1	7					1		3
Guatemala																		3	1	1						1						4
Hong Kong																										3			1			2
Hungary								5		9			3	4			8		8			5	5							1		9
India																			4				1	1					1	1		5
Iran																								1								1
Ireland											3	3	6	7	4	6	4	4		5	7	9	9	7	10	6	8	6	9	7		19
Israel																													3	3		2
Italy		X				10	5	5		6	6	4	6	7	7	7	8	9	4	8	5	12	14	7	8	6	3	6	4	4		28
Jamaica																										1	1					2
Japan								4	5	4		1	2	3	10	4	5	7		6	10	9	9	8	4	6	8	10	9	6		21
Jordan																								1	1	1	1		1			5
Latvia																													1	1		2
Liechtenstein																					1											1
Lithuania																														2		1
Luxembourg																													1	1		2
Mexico									6		6	4			7	9	8	8	8	12	5	6	4	4	4	5	4	1	4	3		19
Moldova																														1		1
Morocco																											1	1	4	2		4
Netherlands						1	5	8	3	9	5	3	1				7	7		3	8	12	8	8	8	8	11	12	8	9		21
Netherlands Antilles																								1	1							2
New Zealand														1	3			1		5	8	6	6	7	10	9	6	5	7	4		14
Norway					3	5		6		6		2	4							1	1	1				4	1		2	2		13
Palestine																												1				1
Peru																				1								1				2
Philippines																						1	1	1								3
Poland							6	5		6				4		4	8		11		4	4	5		4	3	4	1	3	9		16
Portugal							4	3		3	8	9	7	9	2		3				1	5	2	1	1	3	2	1	4	5		19
Puerto Rico																		1		2	1		1		1			1	1			7
Qatar																												4				2
Romania										5		6	6	7					7						1							6
Russia		X			7																			2	3	5	3	5	5			8
Saudi Arabia																							3	4	2	4	4			3		6
Singapore																													1	1		2
South Africa																						3					1	1	2	1		5
South Korea												1		2	7						10	5			4	1		1	1	1		10
Soviet Union												9	9	10	10	10	11	7	11		8											9
Spain							4	6			7	6	6	8	3		4	4		4	8	8	13	11	4	2	3	9	5	8		20
Sri Lanka																													1			1
Sweden					17	22	12	9	6	9	9	9	9	10	3		5	1		8	4	12	13	9	11	12	12	12	9	9		24
Switzerland							9	9		6	4	7	9	8	6	6	11	4		8	8	7	11	8	9	5	4	7	7	7		22
Syria																											1		1	1		3
Chinese Taipei																												1	1			2
Thailand																									1		1		3	1		4
Turkey										4	6		6	3														1				5
Ukraine																										4	5	5	2			4
Unified Team																						8										1
United Team of Germany													9	9	10																	3
United Arab Emirates																										1				3		2
United Arab Republic														3																		1
United States		X			4	8	5	5	8	8	7	9	8	10	10	11	11	12		11	12	12	14	14	13	12	13	12	9	9		26
Uruguay														3										2				1				3
Venezuela													3								1					1		2		2		5
Virgin Islands																				1	1	1		1								4
Yugoslavia							1													3												2
West Germany																11	11	11		11	13											5
Zimbabwe																												1				1
Nations	–	5	–	1	10	8	17	20	6	21	17	25	29	29	20	18	27	23	11	30	32	35	30	37	38	42	40	43	49	49		
Horse riders	–	37-64	–	12	62	89	97	113	31	127	103	134	158	159	116	125	179	135	68	157	182	215	218	195	203	193	199	200	200	200		
Year	96	00	04	08	12	20	24	28	32	36	48	52	56	60	64	68	72	76	80	84	88	92	96	00	04	08	12	16	20	24	28	

== Adverse incidents ==
=== Riders ===
- 2012: Hawley Bennett-Awad (CAN) was hospitalized after breaking her pelvis when she fell from her mount during the cross-country portion of the event.

=== Horses ===
- 1936: Legény ridden by István Visy (HUN) was euthanised after breaking a leg at fence four.
- 1936: Slippery Slim ridden by John Willems (USA) was euthanised after breaking a leg at fence four, The Pond. Two other horses were destroyed due to injuries at that fence.
- 1956: Iller, ridden by Johan Asker (SWE) was euthanised after breaking a leg on the cross country course.
- 1960: Mures II, ridden by Andrei Cadar (ROU) collapsed and died after finishing the cross country course.
- 2004: Over and Over ridden by Joris Vanspringel (BEL) suffered a fracture of the left femur during the cross-country portion of the event. The horse was euthanized when veterinarians concluded that the injury could not be repaired.
- 2008: Keymaster ridden by Magnus Gallerdal (SWE) sustained a fracture of the pastern while competing during cross-country of the eventing competition. The horse was transported by ambulance to the Hong Kong Jockey Club's vet clinic and underwent surgery to place four screws in his leg.
- 2020: Jet Set (SUI) ridden by Robin Godel was euthanized after sustaining an injury during the cross-country portion of the Eventing competition.

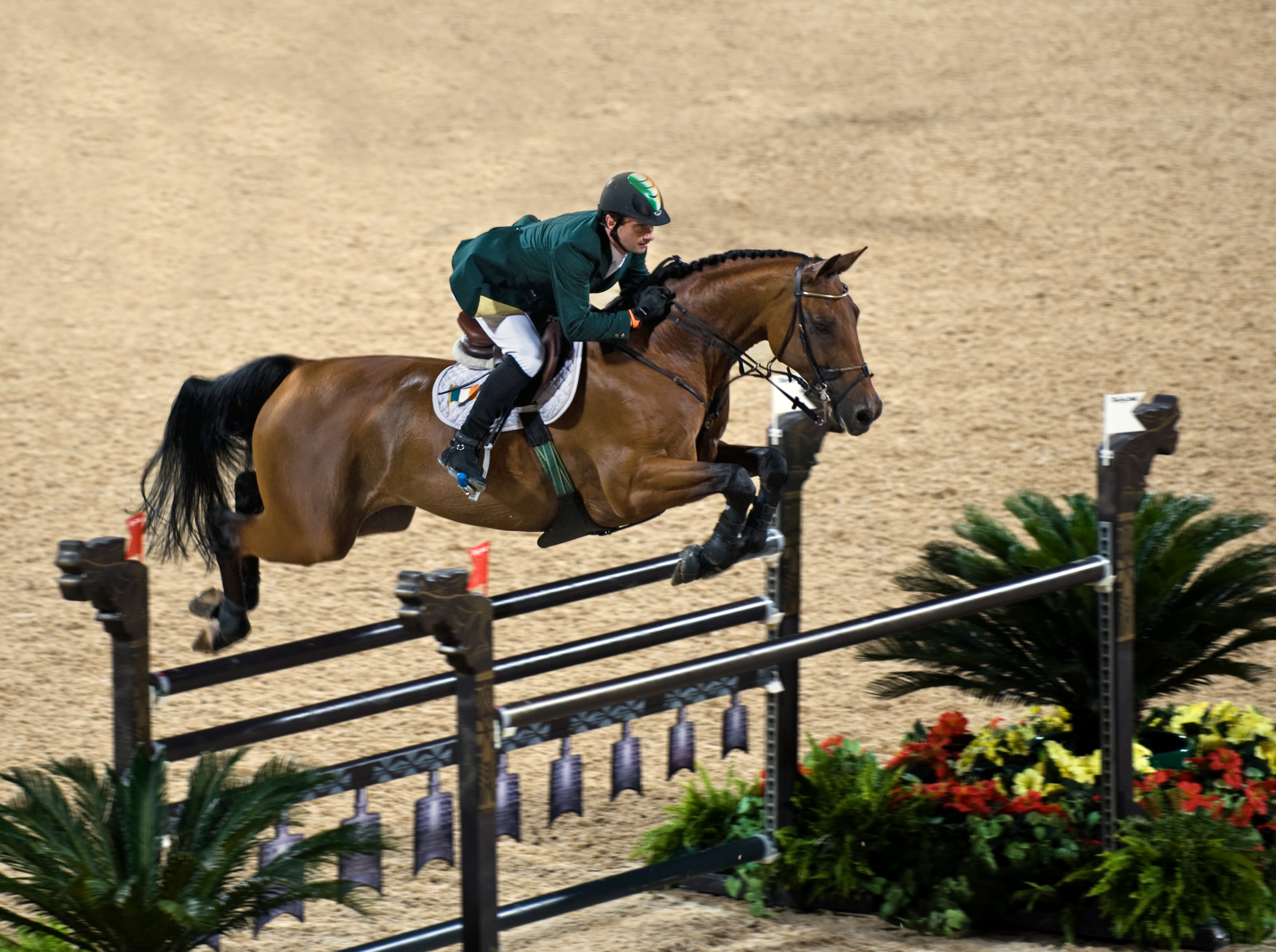
Denis Lynch and Latinus competing in Hong Kong.

=== Sanctions ===
- 2000: Canadian show jumper Eric Lamaze was banned from competition before reaching the Games after testing positive for cocaine.
- 2004: Positive tests for banned substances changed the medal counts in several events.
  - Cian O'Connor (IRL) forfeited his individual gold medal in show jumping when his horse Waterford Crystal was found to have traces of fluphenazine and zuclopenthixol in its system.
  - A positive test for betamethasone in Ludger Beerbaum's mount Goldfever 3 caused Germany to be stripped of their team gold medal in showjumping.
- 2008: A number of horses were found to have had positive tests for banned substances. They were disqualified from the Olympic games and all medals, prize money and international points were forfeited. The competitors included:
  - Chupa Chup, found to have traces of capsaicin and ridden in show jumping by Bernardo Alves (BRA)
  - Rufus, found to have traces of nonivamide and ridden in show jumping by Rodrigo Pessoa (BRA)
  - Cöster, found to have traces of capsaicin and ridden in show jumping by Christian Ahlmann (GER)
  - Latinus, found to have traces of capsaicin and ridden in show jumping by Denis Lynch (IRL)
  - Camiro, found to have traces of capsaicin and ridden in show jumping by Tony Andre Hansen (NOR)
  - Mythilus, tested positive for Felbinac and ridden in dressage by Courtney King-Dye (USA)
  - Cornet Obolensky, tested positive for lactonase and was ridden in the show jumping competition by Marco Kutscher (GER)
- 2016: Jur Vrieling (NED) was disqualified from the individual show jumping competition for excessive whip use, and Nicola Philippaerts (BEL) was disqualified from the individual show jumping competition for excessive spur use.
- 2024: The Belgian eventing team was disqualified after Dia Van Het Lichterveld Z, ridden by Tine Magnus tested positive for trazodone, a banned substance.

== See also ==
- Equestrian events at the Asian Games
- Equestrian events at the Pan American Games
- Equestrian events at the Summer Paralympics
