= Russian Empire at the Olympics =

- Flag of the Russian Empire
- IOC code: RU1
- NOC: Russian Olympic Committee
- Medals Ranked 97th: Gold 1 Silver 4 Bronze 3 Total 8

Summer appearances
- 1900; 1904; 1908; 1912

Other related appearances
- Soviet Union (1952–1988); Unified Team (1992); Russia (1994–2016); ROC (2020); Individual Neutral Athletes (2024)

Russia has competed at the modern Olympic Games on many occasions, but as different nations in its history. As the Russian Empire, the nation first competed at the 1900 Games, and returned again in 1908 and 1912.

In the Grand Duchy of Finland, which was an autonomous part of the Russian Empire until 1917, a separate National Olympic Committee was created in 1907. Finland's own team thus participated already in the Olympic Games of 1908 and 1912.

After the Russian Revolution in 1917, and the subsequent establishment of the Soviet Union in 1922, it would be thirty years until Russian athletes again competed at the Olympics, as the Soviet Union at the 1952 Summer Olympics. After the dissolution of the Soviet Union in 1991, the new country of the Russian Federation competed as part of the Unified Team in 1992, and finally returned again as Russia for the 1994 Winter Olympics.

== Timeline of participation ==
Olympic Year/s	Teams								
1900–1904	Russian Empire								
1908–1912	Finland	Russian Empire							
1920	Finland	Estonia							
1924–1928	Finland	Estonia	Latvia	Lithuania	as part of Romania				
1932–1936	Finland	Estonia	Latvia		as part of Romania				
1952–1988	Finland	Soviet Union							
1992	Finland	Estonia	Latvia	Lithuania	Unified Team				
1994	Finland	Estonia	Latvia	Lithuania	Moldova	Russia	Belarus	Armenia; Georgia; Kazakhstan; Kyrgyzstan; Ukraine; Uzbekistan	
1996–2016	Finland	Estonia	Latvia	Lithuania	Moldova	Russia	Belarus	Armenia; Georgia; Kazakhstan; Kyrgyzstan; Ukraine; Uzbekistan	Azerbaijan; Tajikistan; Turkmenistan
2018	Finland	Estonia	Latvia	Lithuania	Moldova	Olympic Athletes from Russia	Belarus	Armenia; Georgia; Kazakhstan; Kyrgyzstan; Ukraine; Uzbekistan	Azerbaijan; Tajikistan; Turkmenistan
2020–2022	Finland	Estonia	Latvia	Lithuania	Moldova	ROC	Belarus	Armenia; Georgia; Kazakhstan; Kyrgyzstan; Ukraine; Uzbekistan	Azerbaijan; Tajikistan; Turkmenistan
2024–present	Finland	Estonia	Latvia	Lithuania	Moldova	Individual Neutral Athletes		Armenia; Georgia; Kazakhstan; Kyrgyzstan; Ukraine; Uzbekistan	Azerbaijan; Tajikistan; Turkmenistan

== Medal tables ==
=== Medals by Summer Games ===
Games	Athletes	Gold	Silver	Bronze	Total	Rank
1900 Paris	4	0	0	0	0	–
1904 St. Louis	did not participate					
1908 London	6	1	2	0	3	12
1912 Stockholm	159	0	2	3	5	16
Total		1	4	3	8	97

=== Medals by summer sport ===
Sport	Gold	Silver	Bronze	Total
Wrestling	0	3	0	3
Shooting	0	1	1	2
Rowing	0	0	1	1
Sailing	0	0	1	1
Totals (4 entries)	0	4	3	7

This table does not include the gold medal won in Figure skating at the 1908 Summer Olympics.

=== Medals by winter sport ===
Sport	Gold	Silver	Bronze	Total
Figure skating	1	0	0	1
Totals (1 entries)	1	0	0	1

This table includes the gold medal won in Figure skating at the 1908 Summer Olympics.

== Summary by sport ==
=== Equestrian ===
The Russian Empire competed in equestrian at the first Games in which the sport was held, in Paris 1900. Two riders competed in all five of the events, but did not win medals.

Games	Riders	Events	Gold	Silver	Bronze	Total
1900 Paris	2	5/5	0	0	0	0
Total			0	0	0	0

==== Jumping ====
Event	No. of appearances	First appearance	First medal	First gold medal	Gold	Silver	Bronze	Total	Best finish
Individual jumping	2/25	1900	—N/a	—N/a	0	0	0	0	9th (1912)
High jump	1/1	1900	—N/a	—N/a	0	0	0	0	7–19 (1900)
Long jump	1/1	1900	—N/a	—N/a	0	0	0	0	9–17 (1900)

==== Driving ====
Event	No. of appearances	First appearance	First medal	First gold medal	Gold	Silver	Bronze	Total	Best finish
Hacks and hunter combined	1/1	1900	—N/a	—N/a	0	0	0	0	5–51 (1900)
Mail coach	1/1	1900	—N/a	—N/a	0	0	0	0	5–31 (1900)

=== Fencing ===
The Russian Empire's 1900 Olympic debut included two fencers in the men's masters sabre event; they placed 5th and 7th.

Games	Fencers	Events	Gold	Silver	Bronze	Total
1900 Paris	2	1/7	0	0	0	0
Total			0	0	0	0

Event	No. of appearances	First appearance	First medal	First gold medal	Gold	Silver	Bronze	Total	Best finish
Men's masters sabre	1/1	1900	—N/a	—N/a	0	0	0	0	5th (1900)

== See also ==
- List of flag bearers for Russia at the Olympics
- Category:Olympic competitors for Russia
