= Individual jumping at the Olympics =

Olympic sport

Show jumping at the Olympic Games
- Individual jumping

Overview
- Sport: Equestrian
- Gender: Open
- Years held: Open: 1900, 1912–2024

Reigning champion
- Open: Christian Kukuk (GER)

The individual show jumping is an equestrian event on the Olympic programme. It is the oldest of the six events on the current programme, debuting in 1900 as one of the first Olympic equestrian events. No equestrian events were held in 1904 or 1908; when the sport returned in 1912, individual jumping was joined by team jumping, individual and team eventing, and individual dressage. Individual jumping has been held at every Games since. Other jumping-related events held only once were high jump and long jump competitions in 1900 and individual and team vaulting competitions in 1920.

== Medalists ==
Games	Gold	Silver	Bronze
1900 Paris	Aimé Haegeman; Belgium	Georges Van Der Poele; Belgium	Louis de Champsavin; France
1912 Stockholm	Jacques Cariou; France	Rabod von Kröcher; Germany	Emmanuel de Blommaert; Belgium
1920 Antwerp	Tommaso Lequio di Assaba; Italy	Alessandro Valerio; Italy	Carl Gustaf Lewenhaupt; Sweden
1924 Paris	Alphonse Gemuseus; Switzerland	Tommaso Lequio di Assaba; Italy	Adam Królikiewicz; Poland
1928 Amsterdam	František Ventura; Czechoslovakia	Pierre Bertran de Balanda; France	Charles-Gustave Kuhn; Switzerland
1932 Los Angeles	Takeichi Nishi; Japan	Harry Chamberlin; United States	Clarence von Rosen, Jr. Sweden
1936 Berlin	Kurt Hasse; Germany	Henri Rang; Romania	József von Platthy; Hungary
1948 London	Humberto Mariles; Mexico	Rubén Uriza; Mexico	Jean-François d'Orgeix; France
1952 Helsinki	Pierre Jonquères d'Oriola; France	Óscar Cristi; Chile	Fritz Thiedemann; Germany
1956 Melbourne	Hans Günter Winkler; United Team of Germany	Raimondo D'Inzeo; Italy	Piero D'Inzeo; Italy
1960 Rome	Raimondo D'Inzeo; Italy	Piero D'Inzeo; Italy	David Broome; Great Britain
1964 Tokyo	Pierre Jonquères d'Oriola; France	Hermann Schridde; United Team of Germany	Peter Robeson; Great Britain
1968 Mexico City	William Steinkraus; United States	Marion Coakes; Great Britain	David Broome; Great Britain
1972 Munich	Graziano Mancinelli; Italy	Ann Moore; Great Britain	Neal Shapiro; United States
1976 Montreal	Alwin Schockemöhle; West Germany	Michel Vaillancourt; Canada	François Mathy; Belgium
1980 Moscow	Jan Kowalczyk; Poland	Nikolai Korolkov; Soviet Union	Joaquín Pérez; Mexico
1984 Los Angeles	Joseph Fargis; United States	Conrad Homfeld; United States	Heidi Robbiani; Switzerland
1988 Seoul	Pierre Durand Jr. France	Greg Best; United States	Karsten Huck; West Germany
1992 Barcelona	Ludger Beerbaum; Germany	Piet Raymakers; Netherlands	Norman Dello Joio; United States
1996 Atlanta	Ulrich Kirchhoff; Germany	Willi Melliger; Switzerland	Alexandra Ledermann; France
2000 Sydney	Jeroen Dubbeldam; Netherlands	Albert Voorn; Netherlands	Khaled Al Eid; Saudi Arabia
2004 Athens	Rodrigo Pessoa; Brazil	Chris Kappler; United States	Marco Kutscher; Germany
2008 Beijing	Eric Lamaze; Canada	Rolf-Göran Bengtsson; Sweden	Beezie Madden; United States
2012 London	Steve Guerdat; Switzerland	Gerco Schroder; Netherlands	Cian O'Connor; Ireland
2016 Rio de Janeiro	Nick Skelton; Great Britain	Peder Fredricson; Sweden	Eric Lamaze; Canada
2020 Tokyo	Ben Maher on Explosion W (GBR)	Peder Fredricson on All In (SWE)	Maikel van der Vleuten on Beauville Z (NED)
2024 Paris	Christian Kukuk on Checker 47 (GER)	Steve Guerdat on Dynamix De Belheme (SUI)	Maikel van der Vleuten on Beauville Z (NED)

=== Multiple medalists ===
Rank	Rider	Nation	Olympics	Gold	Silver	Bronze	Total
1	Pierre Jonquères d'Oriola	France	1952, 1964	2	0	0	2
2	Raimondo D'Inzeo	Italy	1956–1960	1	1	0	2
2	Tommaso Lequio di Assaba	Italy	1920–1924	1	1	0	2
4	Eric Lamaze	Canada	2008, 2016	1	0	1	2
5	Piero D'Inzeo	Italy	1956–1960	0	1	1	2
6	David Broome	Great Britain	1960, 1968	0	0	2	2

=== Medalists by country ===
Rank	Nation	Gold	Silver	Bronze	Total
1	France	4	1	3	8
2	Italy	3	4	1	8
3	Germany	3	1	2	6
4	United States	2	4	3	9
5	Switzerland	2	1	2	5
6	Netherlands	1	3	1	5
7	Great Britain	2	2	3	7
8	Belgium	1	1	2	4
9	Canada	1	1	1	3
9	Mexico	1	1	1	3
11	United Team of Germany	1	1	0	2
12	Poland	1	0	1	2
12	West Germany	1	0	1	2
15	Brazil	1	0	0	1
15	Czechoslovakia	1	0	0	1
15	Japan	1	0	0	1
17	Sweden	0	3	2	5
18	Chile	0	1	0	1
18	Romania	0	1	0	1
18	Soviet Union	0	1	0	1
21	Hungary	0	0	1	1
21	Ireland	0	0	1	1
21	Saudi Arabia	0	0	1	1
