= Camille de La Forgue de Bellegarde =

French soldier and officer

- Born: Marie Camille Armand de La Forgue de Bellegarde; March 29, 1841; Gap, France
- Died: 23 October 1905 (aged 64); Cellettes, France
- Military career
- Allegiance: France
- Branch: French Army
- Service years: 1860–1904
- Rank: Général de brigade
- Awards: Commandeur of the Legion d'Honneur

Marie Camille Armand de La Forgue de Bellegarde (29 March 1841 – 23 October 1905) was a French military officer and horse rider and instructor.

La Forgue de Bellegarde joined the French Army in 1860, enrolling at the École spéciale militaire de Saint-Cyr. Upon graduation, he was commissioned as a junior officer in the 2nd Chasseurs Regiment, becoming a lieutenant in 1868. Following the Franco-Prussian War, during which he was captured and taken prisoner, he became an instructor at Saint-Cyr, where he rose to the rank of général de brigade. He retired in 1904.

Among his many honours, La Forgue de Bellegarde was appointed a Commandeur of the Legion d'Honneur, and Officier d'Académie, and commander of the Russian Order of St. Stanislaus.

Bellegarde was born in Gap on 29 March 1841, the son of politician Calixte Joseph Camille de La Forgue de Bellegarde. He was married and had two sons. On 23 October 1905, he suffered a stroke and died at his home in Cellettes.

Some sources report that La Forgue de Bellegarde competed in the equestrian events at the 1900 Olympic Games, finishing third in the long jump. (Note: Other sources report the rider in that event was Jacques de Prunelé; the rider could also have been one of Bellegarde's sons, a lieutenant in a dragoon regiment of the French Army.)
