= Abdel-Qader Saïd =

Belgian professional Equestrian

Abdel Saïd
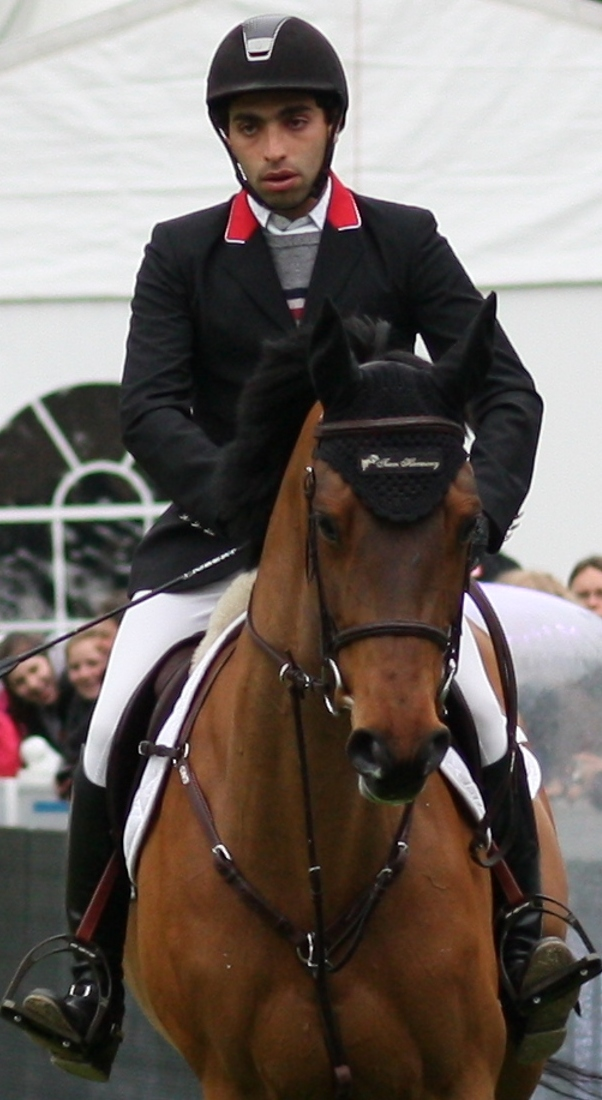
- Saïd in 2013

Personal information
- Full name: Abdel-Qader Saïd
- Nationality: Belgian, Egyptian
- Discipline: Show Jumping
- Born: 11 June 1989 (age 37); Alexandria, Egypt
- Home town: Diest, Belgium
Medal record
Representing Belgium
World Championships
Silver medal – second place	2026 Aachen	Team jumping

Abdel-Qader Saïd (born 11 June 1989), also known as Abdel Saïd, is an Egyptian-Belgian equestrian. He made his debut appearance at the Olympics representing Egypt at the 2020 Summer Olympics, competing in individual jumping. He represented Belgium at the 2026 World Championship in Aachen, winning Team Silver.

In 2021 he switched to the Belgian nationality to compete and he represented this country in the sport. The change happened due to issues with the Egyptian Equestrian Federation and because he has been based in Belgium for many years. Said already had his stable located in Belgium and habits in the European center of Equestrianism for over 20 years before the change.

Saïd previously trained under Emile Hendrix and Jos Lasnik.

== Career Highlights ==
Some of the highlights in his career include:

- 2007 Pan Arab Games Cairo - Individual Bronze
- 2007 Pan Arab Games Cairo - Team Silver
- 2011 Pan Arab Games Doha - Team bronze
- 2018 FEI World Equestrian Games
- 2019 Regional African Games - Team 2nd
- 2019 FEI World Cup Final - Top 10
- 2024 CSIO5* LGCT Grand Prix Doha - Win
- 2025 LGCT Super Grand Prix Winner
