= Equestrian events at the 1900 Summer Olympics =

Equestrian at the Games of the II Olympiad
- Venue: 7th arrondissement of Paris (south of the Place de Breteuil)
- Dates: 29 May – 2 June 1900
- No. of events: 5
- Competitors: Up to 64 (Note: The exact number of competitors is unknown. Mallon has 47 known competitors, giving no estimate for unknowns. Many of the known competitors are in the four-in-hand mail coach event. De Wael claims 16 unknowns and adds a 48th name to the known list, for a total of 64. Both sources include all five events. Calculation of number of competitors is complicated by the fact that a rider might enter an event multiple times on different horses.) from 8 (Note: Official figures based on nationality of owner.) nations

Five equestrian competitions were held from 29 May to 2 June 1900 at the Concours Hippique International (English: International Horse Show) in Paris as part of the Exposition Universelle. The events were later classified as part of the 1900 Summer Olympics. The events were organised by the Société hippique française, with competitors from eight countries competing in three jumping and two driving events at the Place de Breteuil in the 7th arrondissement of Paris.

Only the three jumping events had been considered "Olympic" by the International Olympic Committee in the past. The IOC website currently has affirmed a total of 95 medal events, after accepting, as it appears, the recommendation of Olympic historian Bill Mallon for events that should be considered "Olympic". These additional events include two equestrian driving events. It is not certain how many competitors there were, but it is likely that there were between 37 and 64. Five nations competed in the Olympic jumping events, with three more (Germany, Spain, and Austria) in the two driving events. There were three female riders, all of whom competed in the hacks and hunter combined event: Italian Elvira Guerra and Frenchwomen Jane Moulin and Blanche de Marcigny.

== Schedule ==
Date	Time	Event
Tuesday, 29 May 1900		Jumping (obstacle course)
Thursday, 31 May 1900		Hacks and hunter combined
Thursday, 31 May 1900		Long jump
Saturday, 2 June 1900	14:00	Four-in-hand mail coach
Saturday, 2 June 1900	16:30	High jump

== Medal table ==
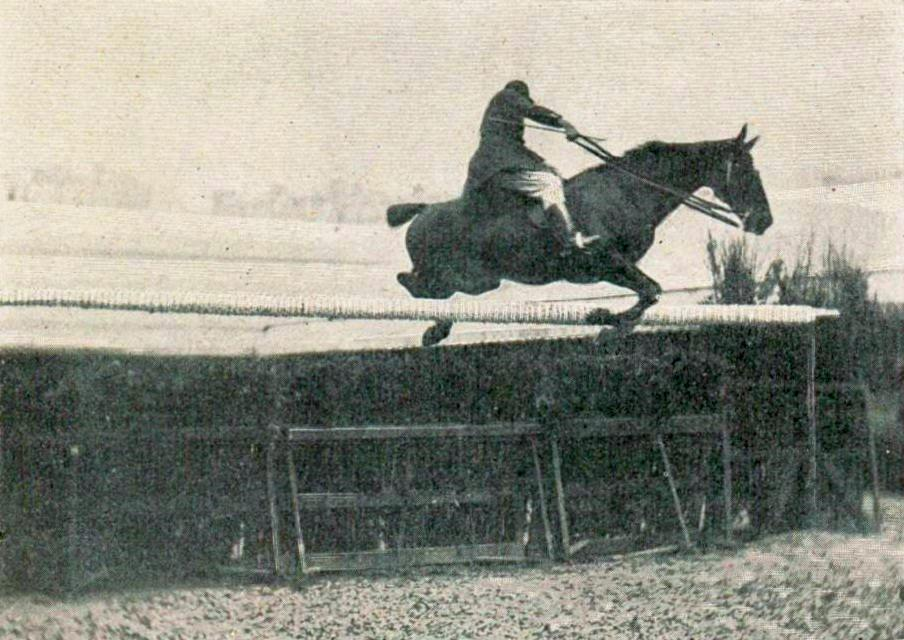
Dominique Gardères, winner of the high jump competition

Rank	Nation	Gold	Silver	Bronze	Total
1	Belgium	3	1	1	5
2	France	2	2	4	8
3	Italy	1	1	0	2
Totals (3 entries)		6	4	5	15

== Medal summary ==
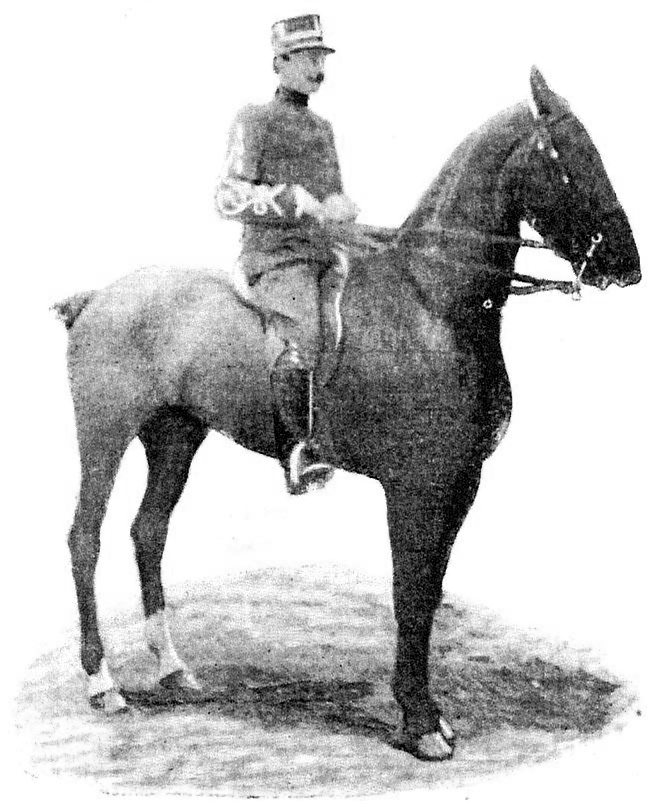
Constant van Langhendonck, winner of the long jump competition

Event	Gold	Silver	Bronze
Jumping	Aimé Haegeman; Belgium	Georges Van Der Poele; Belgium	Louis de Champsavin; France
High jump	Dominique Gardères; France Gian Giorgio Trissino; Italy	none awarded	Georges Van Der Poele; Belgium
Long jump	Constant van Langhendonck; Belgium	Gian Giorgio Trissino; Italy	Jacques de Prunelé; France
Hacks and hunter	Napoléon Murat; France	Victor Archenoul; France	Robert de Montesquiou-Fézensac; France
Mail coach	Georges Nagelmackers; Belgium	Léon Thome; France	Jean de Neuflize; France

== See also ==
- List of Olympic medalists in equestrian

== Sources ==
- International Olympic Committee medal winners database
- De Wael, Herman. Herman's Full Olympians: "Equestrian 1900". Accessed 19 January 2006. Available electronically at.
- Mallon, Bill (1998). The 1900 Olympic Games, Results for All Competitors in All Events, with Commentary. Jefferson, North Carolina: McFarland & Company, Inc., Publishers. ISBN 0-7864-0378-0.
