= Georges de Lagarenne =

French equestrian

Personal information
- Full name: Georges Gabriel Julien Edouard de Marette de Lagarenne
- Nationality: French
- Born: 27 July 1856 Alençon, France
- Died: 15 October 1929 (aged 73) Paris, France

Sport
- Sport: Equestrian

Georges Gabriel Julien Edouard de Marette de Lagarenne (27 July 1856 – 15 October 1929) was a French equestrian.

In May 1900, Lagarenne competed in the hacks and hunter combined event during the International Horse Show in Paris. The show was part of the Exposition Universelle, and the equestrian events were later classified as part of the 1900 Summer Olympics.
