= Louis Napoléon Achille Charles Murat =

French-Georgian military officer

Prince Napoléon Murat
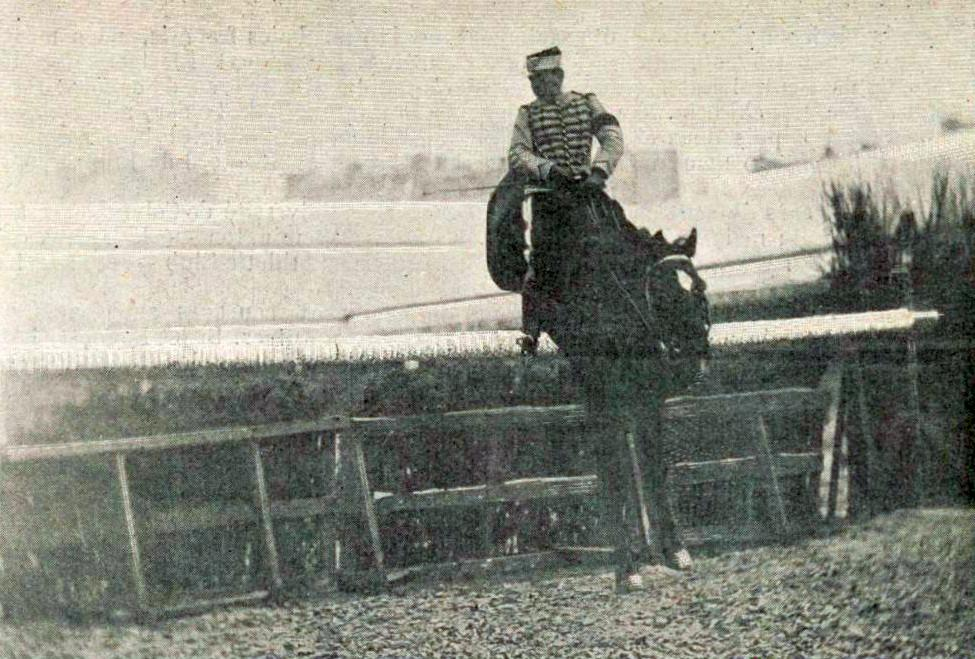

Personal details
- Born: Louis Napoléon Achille Charles Murat; 25 August 1872 Brunoy, France
- Died: 14 June 1943 (aged 70) Nice, France
- Parents: Achille Murat (father); Salome Dadiani (mother)

Military service
- Allegiance: France; Russia; Bulgaria
- Branch/service: French Army; Imperial Russian Army
- Rank: Lieutenant (France); Major general (Russia)
- Battles/wars: Second Madagascar expedition Russo-Japanese War; First Balkan War; World War I
- Awards: Legion d'Honneur; Order of St. Vladimir; Order of St. Anna; Order of St. Stanislaus; Cross of St. George
- Sports career
- Country: France
- Sport: Equestrian
Medal record
Gold medal – first place	1900 Paris	Hacks and hunter

Prince Louis Napoléon Achille Charles Murat (25 August 1872 – 14 June 1943), also known as Napoléon Akhilovich Murat (in Russian: Наполеон Ахилович Мюрат), was a French-Georgian military officer. A member of the House of Murat and direct descendant of Caroline Bonaparte, sister of Napoleon, he was first commissioned in the French Army but spent most of his military career in the Imperial Russian Army, rising to the rank of major general.

== Personal life ==
Murat was born on 25 August 1872 in Brunoy, France, the second child of Charles Louis Napoléon Achille Murat of the House of Murat, and Salome Dadiani, Georgian princess of Mingrelia and member of the House of Dadiani. He was a great-grandson of Joachim Murat, King of Naples and 1st Prince Murat, and great-grandnephew of Napoleon. He moved to his mother's native Georgia around 1904. Having returned to France in the early 1920s following Georgia's annexation by the Soviet Union and installation of a Bolshevik regime in the country, he lived in Nice and worked as a translator. He died on 14 June 1943. He never married.

== Military career ==
Murat began his military career in the French Army in 1891, and attended the Saumur Cavalry School. He served with the 25th Dragoon Regiment during the French conquest of Madagascar, where it was mistakenly reported that he had died from malaria. He became a lieutenant in 1899 when he was with the 14th Hussars Regiment, and later joined the 9th Cuirassier Regiment. Laws passed in France in the early 1900s meant that, as a member of a former ruling house, his opportunities for progression within the French Army became limited and he resigned his commission.

Murat left France and joined the Imperial Russian Army, where he was commissioned as lieutenant with the 2nd Dagestan Cavalry Regiment. He saw action in the Russo-Japanese War, during which time he was shot in the head and neck; he was decorated for his bravery. Following the war, he served as captain and later lieutenant colonel in the Life Guard Horse Regiment before becoming a colonel instructor at the Nicholas Cavalry College in St Petersburg. During this time he gained a reputation as a duelist.

In 1912, Murat resigned from the Russian Army to command a force of volunteers and mercenaries under the flag of Bulgaria during the First Balkan War. After spending time in Argentina, where he bred horses for an oil tycoon, he rejoined the Imperial Russian Army at the outbreak of World War I, commanding the Ingush Regiment of the Caucasian Native Cavalry Division, also known as the Savage or Wild Division. Fighting in the Carpathians, he suffered severe frostbite to his legs, that ultimately resulted in double amputation some years later. He also commanded the 12th Dragoon Regiment Starodubovskogo and served in the Ministry of War. He rose to the rank of major general. During the Russian Civil War he fought with the White Armies.

Among his many honours, he was awarded the Cross of St. George and was appointed to the Order of St. Vladimir, 3rd class with swords, the Order of St. Anna, and the Order of St. Stanislaus. In 1928, he was appointed a chevalier of Legion d'Honneur.

== Equestrian ==
In May and June 1900, Murat competed in four equestrian events during the International Horse Show in Paris. The events were part of the Exposition Universelle, and later classified as part of the 1900 Summer Olympics. He won first prize in the hacks and hunter combined event with his horse, The General. He also competed in the obstacle jumping, long jump and high jump events. He finished fourth in the long jump on Bayard, and was part of a jump off for third place in the high jump on Arcadius.

== Ancestry ==
Ancestors of Louis Napoléon Achille Charles Murat

16. Pierre Murat-Jordy
8. Joachim, King of Naples
17. Jeanne Loubières
4. Lucien, 3rd Prince Murat
18. Carlo Buonaparte
9. Caroline Bonaparte
19. Letizia Ramolino
2. Achille Murat
5. Caroline Georgina Fraser
1. Louis Napoléon Achille Charles Murat
24. Grigol Dadiani
12. Levan V Dadiani
25. Princess Nino of Georgia
6. David Dadiani
26. Prince Zurab Tsereteli
13. Princess Marta Tsereteli
27. Tamara Dadiani
3. Salomé Dadiani
28. Garsevan Chavchavadze
14. Alexander Chavchavadze
29. Princess Mariam Avalishvili
7. Ekaterine Chavchavadze
30. Ioane Orbeliani
15. Salomé Orbeliani
31. Atato-Anastasia Cholokashvili
