= Charles-Eugène de Veauce =

French equestrian

Charles-Eugène, Baron de Veauce
Personal information
- Full name: Charles-Eugène Amable de Cadier de Veauce
- Born: 21 February 1868; Paris, France
- Died: 22 January 1934 (aged 65); Clermont-Ferrand, France

Sport
- Sport: Equestrian

Charles-Eugène Amable de Cadier de Veauce (21 February 1868 – 22 January 1934) was a member of French nobility and an equestrian.

== Personal life ==
Cadier de Veauce was born in Paris on 21 February 1868, the eldest son of landowner and politician Charles Eugène de Cadier, Baron de Veauce and Jeanne de Wykersloot van Weerdesteyn. He was married twice, in 1892 to Claire de Riberolles, and in 1907 to Gertrude Mary Burton. He died in Clermont-Ferrand on 22 January 1934.

== Equestrian ==
Cadier de Veauce competed in the equestrian mail coach event at the 1900 Summer Olympics.
