= Equestrian at the 1900 Summer Olympics – High jump =

Equestrian at the Olympics

Equestrian high jump at the Games of the II Olympiad
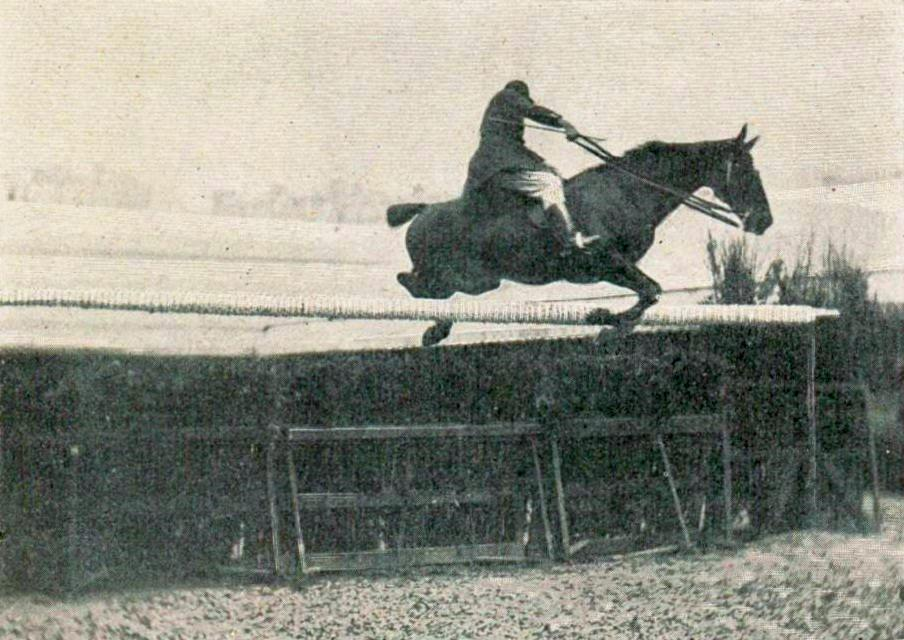
- Dominique Gardères during equestrian high jump competition
- Venue: 7th arrondissement of Paris
- Date: 2 June
- Competitors: 19 from 5 nations
- Winning height: 1.85 metres

Medalists
1st place, gold medalist(s)		Dominique Gardères; France
1st place, gold medalist(s)		Gian Giorgio Trissino; Italy
3rd place, bronze medalist(s)		Georges Van Der Poele; Belgium

The high jump was one of five equestrian competitions held in late May and early June 1900 at the International Horse Show in Paris. The event was part of the Exposition Universelle, and later classified as part of the 1900 Summer Olympics. It is the only Olympic Games to date to feature an equestrian high jump competition. Nineteen competitors entered the high jump competition (similar to the modern puissance), although not all details have been discovered.

Rain earlier on the day of the competition made the ground heavy and slippery, and the competition was close. Gian Giorgio Trissino and Dominique Gardères (Note: Alternative research suggests the rider was Alfred Gardère.) were joint winners after both cleared 1.85 metres (6 ft 1 in). Competitors were allowed to enter more than once, and Trissino also came fourth on another horse; he also came second in the long jump competition. Georges Van Der Poele, who had finished second in the show jumping competition a few days earlier, was third. (Note: Some sources list the rider as André Moreau.)

== Background ==
No equestrian events were held at the first modern Olympics in 1896. Five events, including this one, were featured in 1900. Only the show jumping competition would ever be held again after that; this was the only appearance of the high jump.

== Competition format ==
Much like the human high jump, competitors received three attempts at each successive height. The bar started at 1.20 metres and increased by 10 centimetres at a time initially, at some point changing to 5 centimetres. Riders could compete more than once on different horses.

== Schedule ==
Date	Time	Round
Saturday, 2 June 1900	16:30	Final

== Results ==
Little is known of detailed results, though all of the competitors cleared 1.50 metres.

Rank	Rider	Nation	Horse	Height
1st place, gold medalist(s)	Dominique Gardères	France	Canéla	1.85
1st place, gold medalist(s)	Gian Giorgio Trissino	Italy	Oreste	1.85
3rd place, bronze medalist(s)	Georges Van Der Poele	Belgium	Ludlow	1.70
4	Gian Giorgio Trissino	Italy	Mélopo	1.70
5–8	Paul Haëntjens	France	Nell	1.70
5–8	Henri Leclerc	France	Mahomet	1.70
5–8	Napoléon Murat	France	Arcadius	1.70
5–8	Wignolle	France	Sunrise	1.70
9–19
9–19	Napoléon Murat	France	Bayard	Unknown
9–19	Hubert Dutech	France	Unknown	Unknown
9–19	Charles van Langhendonck	Belgium	Black Fly	Unknown
9–19	Constant van Langhendonck	Belgium	Roxanne	Unknown
9–19	Gian Giorgio Trissino	Italy	Montebello	Unknown
9–19	Hermann Mandl	Austria	Unknown	Unknown
9–19	5 unknown combinations			Unknown

== Sources ==
- International Olympic Committee medal winners database
- De Wael, Herman. Herman's Full Olympians: "Equestrian 1900". Available electronically at. Accessed 29 July 2015.
- Mallon, Bill (1998). The 1900 Olympic Games, Results for All Competitors in All Events, with Commentary. Jefferson, North Carolina: McFarland & Company, Inc., Publishers. ISBN 0-7864-0378-0.
