= Jacques d'Arlincourt =

French equestrian

Personal information
- Full name: Jacques François Adrien Guyot d'Arlincourt, Comte d'Arlincourt
- Nationality: French
- Born: 25 May 1850; Ozoir-la-Ferrière, France
- Died: 27 July 1929 (aged 79); Paris, France

Sport
- Sport: Equestrian

Jacques d'Arlincourt (25 May 1850 – 27 July 1929) was a French equestrian. He competed in the equestrian mail coach event at the 1900 Summer Olympics.
