= Perrier-Jouët =

French Champagne producer

Coordinates: 49.0431707°N 3.9589591°E

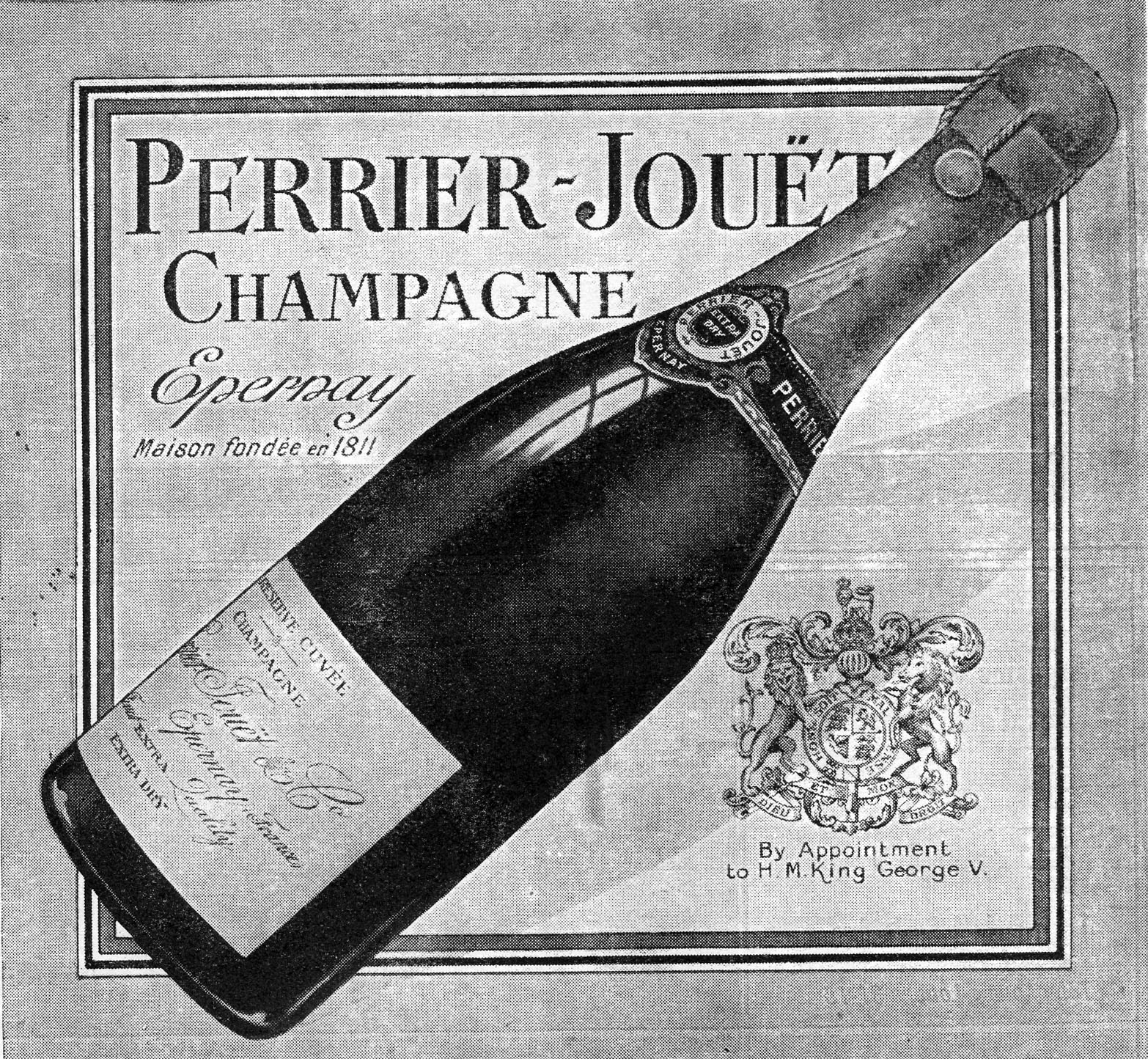
Perrier-Jouët advertisement from 1923

Perrier-Jouët ([pɛʁje ʒuɛt]) is a Champagne producer based in the Épernay region of Champagne. The house was founded in 1811 by Pierre-Nicolas Perrier and Rose Adélaide Jouët, and produces both vintage and non-vintage cuvee, approximately 3,000,000 bottles annually, with its prestige label named Belle Epoque.

Perrier-Jouët owns 266 acres of vineyards in the Champagne region. Today the house is under the Pernod Ricard umbrella of brands. Perrier-Jouët owns over 160 acres of vineyards, with more than half in the Grand Crus of Cramant and Avize.

== History ==
This origin story of those house dates to 1810, when the Épernay-based cork supplier Pierre Nicolas Perrier married Rose Adélaide Jouët, the daughter of a Calvados producer. Perrier's family owned vineyards in Dizy, Chouilly, Aӱ. Having been married just one year, the newlyweds begin producing champagne under the name Perrier-Jouët. Adèle focused on vineyards and winemaking; Pierre Nicolas focused on sales and marketing. Shipments to Great Britain began in 1815 and to the United States in 1837.

Charles Perrier succeeded to his parents in 1854 to 1878. After his death Henri and Octave Gallice became Perrrier-Jouët directors.

Henri Gallice and his younger brother Octave were both art lovers, but while Henri managed the family business in Épernay, Octave spent much of this time in Paris, sharing in the excitement of the "Belle Epoque" those heady years at the start of the 20th century when France was swept along by whirlwind progress in science and arts. In the capital, he met Emile Gallé, one of the pioneers of the Art Nouveau movement, the revolutionary artistic expression of the period. At the brother's request, Emile Gallé created a design for Maison Perrier-Jouët, drawing on his own passion for botany to imagine a spray of Japanese white anemones. Four magnums enamelled with this delicate motif were delivered in 1902, becoming the iconic emblem, not only of the prestigious Perrier-Jouët Belle Epoque cuvée, but of Maison Perrier-Jouët itself.

One of the three bottles of the world's oldest champagne, a Perrier-Jouët (vintage 1825) was opened and tasted in 2009.

Harold Macmillan, Prime Minister of the United Kingdom from 1957 to 1963, favoured vintage Perrier-Jouët.

== See also ==
- List of Champagne houses
