= Octave Gallice =

French wine merchant

- Born: Louis Adolphe Octave Gallice; 8 October 1857; Épernay, France
- Died: 18 June 1906 (aged 48); Paris, France
- Occupation: Wine merchant
- Known for: Perrier-Jouët
- Spouse: Blanche Mauger (after 1892)

Louis Adolphe Octave Gallice (8 October 1857 – 18 June 1906) was a French champagne wine merchant and equestrian.

== Personal life ==
Gallice was born in Épernay on 8 October 1857, the son of Eugène Gallice (1828–1872) and Adeline Purnot. He had three brothers and a sister. He married Blanche Elisa Victorine Mauger in 1892; the couple had no children.

Gallice died in Paris on 18 June 1906.

== Business interests ==
In 1858, Gallice's father had become a partner in Perrier-Jouët with his brother-in-law Charles Perrier. Following the death of Perrier in 1878, Gallice and his brother, Henri, inherited the company, with Henri taking over the running of the business. The brothers also founded Gallice et Compagnie.

== Equestrian ==
In June 1900, Gallice competed in the four-in-hand (mail coach) driving event during the International Horse Show in Paris. The show was part of the Exposition Universelle, and the equestrian events were later classified as part of the 1900 Summer Olympics.
