= Léon Thome =

French equestrian

Personal information
- Full name: Léon Eugène Joseph Thome
- Nationality: French
- Born: 15 July 1857 Néris-les-Bains, Allier, Second French Empire
- Died: 14 April 1925 (aged 67) Paris, France

Sport
- Sport: Equestrian
Medal record
Equestrian
Representing France
Event / 1st / 2nd / 3rd; Olympic Games / – / 1 / –
Olympic Games
Silver medal – second place	1900 Paris	Mail coach

Léon Eugène Joseph Thome (15 July 1857 – 14 April 1925) was a French equestrian. He received recognition with appointments as a knight of the Legion of Honour, and as a knight of the Order of Agricultural Merit.

In June 1900, Thome was runner-up in the four-in-hand (mail coach) driving event during the International Horse Show in Paris. The show was part of the Exposition Universelle, and the equestrian events were later classified as part of the 1900 Summer Olympics.
