= Mathieu Marie de Lesseps =

French equestrian

Personal information
- Nationality: French
- Born: 12 October 1870 Paris, France
- Died: 7 October 1953 (aged 82) Paris, France

Sport
- Sport: Equestrian

Mathieu Marie de Lesseps (12 October 1870 – 7 October 1953) was a French equestrian.

In May 1900, Lesseps competed in the hacks and hunter combined event during the International Horse Show in Paris. The show was part of the Exposition Universelle, and the equestrian events were later classified as part of the 1900 Summer Olympics.
