= Henri Plocque =

French equestrian

Personal information
- Nationality: French
- Born: 3 June 1873; Verrières-le-Buisson, Essonne, France
- Died: 28 September 1914 (aged 41); Miraumont, Somme, France

Sport
- Sport: Equestrian

Henri Eugène Alexandre Plocque (3 June 1873 – 28 September 1914) was a French equestrian. In May–June 1900, he competed in the equestrian events during the International Horse Show in Paris. The show was part of the Exposition Universelle, and the equestrian events were later classified as part of the 1900 Summer Olympics.

== Military career ==
Plocque served as a caporal (corporal) in the 27th Territorial Infantry Regiment of the French Army during the First World War. He was killed in action in Somme on 28 September 1914.
