= Max Guilleaume =

German equestrian

Personal information
- Nationality: German
- Born: 16 February 1866; Cologne, Kingdom of Prussia
- Died: 15 June 1932 (aged 66); Remagen, Germany

Sport
- Sport: Equestrian

Max von Guilleaume (16 February 1866 – 15 June 1932) was a German businessman and sportsman. He competed in the equestrian mail coach event at the 1900 Summer Olympics.
