= Ferdinand Baston de Lariboisière =

French politician

Count Ferdinand Baston de Lariboisière
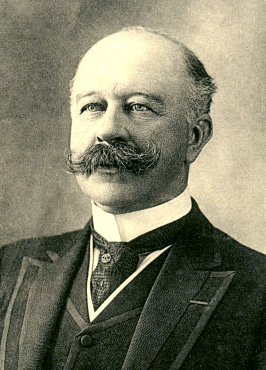

Member of the Chamber of Deputies
- In office 30 April 1882 – 12 November 1885

Member of the Senate
- In office 7 January 1919 – 23 December 1919

Member of the Chamber of Deputies
- In office 16 November 1919 – 31 May 1928

Personal details
- Born: Ferdinand Marie Auguste Baston; 1 January 1856 Paris, France
- Died: 3 May 1931 (aged 75) Paris, France
- Relatives: Honoré-Charles Baston de Lariboisière (father); Jean Ambroise Baston de Lariboisière (grandfather)
- Awards: Legion of Honour

Ferdinand Marie Auguste Baston, Count de Lariboisière (1 January 1856 – 3 May 1931) was a French military officer and politician. He served as mayor of Louvigné-du-Désert, and as a general councillor, deputy, and senator of Ille-et-Vilaine. He was appointed as a chevalier of the Legion of Honour.

== Personal life ==
Baston was born on 1 January 1856 in Paris, the son of Honoré-Charles Baston de Lariboisière, a military officer and politician. His grandfather was Jean Ambroise Baston de Lariboisière, a general who fought in the French Revolutionary Wars and the Napoleonic Wars.

Baston died on 3 May 1931 in Paris.

== Politics ==
Baston was first elected to the Chamber of Deputies as a deputy for Ille-et-Vilaine in 1882. He was re-elected in October 1885 but resigned the following month. In 1886, he was elected as a general councillor for Louvigné-du-Désert; he also became mayor of the commune that year.

Baston returned to the French Parliament in 1906, this time being elected as a senator for Ille-et-Vilaine. He resigned as senator in 1919, having been once again elected as a deputy; he was re-elected in 1924. He resigned as a general councillor in 1925, and retired from politics in 1928.

== Equestrian ==
Baston competed in the equestrian mail coach event at the 1900 Summer Olympics.
