= Hermann Mandl =

Austrian businessman

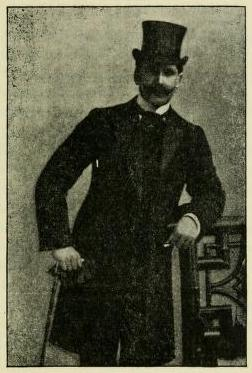
- Born: Hermann John Mandl; 1856; Vienna, Austrian Empire
- Died: 6 March 1922 (aged 65–66); Vienna, Austria
- Occupation: Businessman
- Known for: H.Mandl & Co.

Hermann John Mandl (1856 - 6 March 1922) was an Austrian-Jewish businessman, equestrian and art collector. He founded H.Mandl & Co.

== Personal life ==
Mandl was born in Vienna, Austria in 1856. He travelled to China in the 1870s. Having learned the Chinese language and customs after studying in Peking for two years, in 1880 he was employed by General Zuo Zongtang as an interpreter on a march across the Gobi Desert to Hami.

Mandl died in Vienna on 6 March 1922.

== Business interests ==
In the 1880s he set up his own company H.Mandl & Co., which represented European and American companies in China, including Krupp and Siemens.

== Equestrian ==
In 1900 he competed for Austria at the 1900 Summer Olympics, although there isn't any official record of times and distances he competed in the equestrian events of jumping, high jump and long jump, he also competed in the hacks and hunter combined event and mail coach event, but these are not considered as Olympic Events.
