= Equestrian at the 1900 Summer Olympics – Hacks and hunter combined =

Equestrian at the Olympics

Hacks and hunter combined at the Games of the II Olympiad
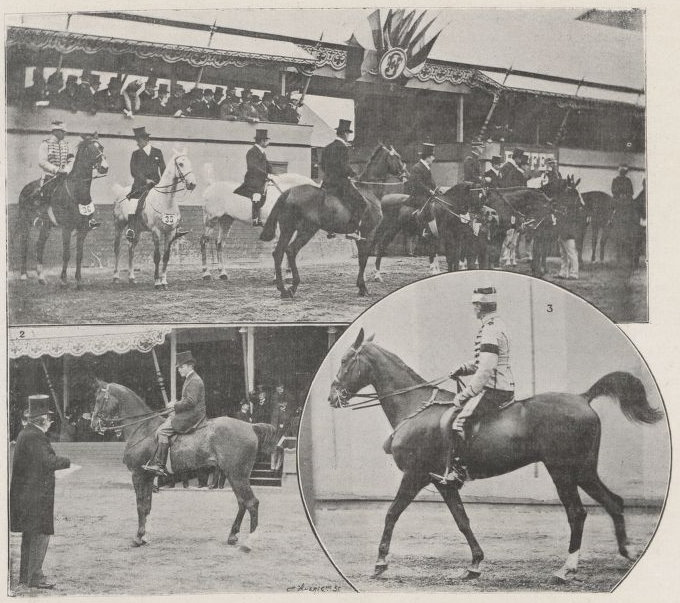
- Images of the hacks and hunter combined competition
- Venue: 7th arrondissement of Paris
- Date: 31 May
- Competitors: 51 from at least 6 nations

Medalists
1st place, gold medalist(s)		Napoléon Murat; France
2nd place, silver medalist(s)		Victor Archenoul; France
3rd place, bronze medalist(s)		Robert de Montesquiou; France

The "hacks and hunter combined", also known as the "chevaux de selle" (English: saddle horses), was one of five equestrian competitions held in late May and early June 1900 at the International Horse Show in Paris. The event was part of the Exposition Universelle, and later classified as part of the 1900 Summer Olympics. It is unknown how many riders competed. The top four placers are known, as are about half the remaining riders who competed, including three women (Elvira Guerra, Jane Moulin and Blanche de Marcigny). As an upper limit, 50 men and 1 woman are listed as entrants in the Official Report, but it is almost certain that not all actually competed.

Sources prior to 1996 often did not list this event as Olympic. The IOC website currently has affirmed a total of 95 medal events, after accepting, as it appears, the recommendation of Olympic historian Bill Mallon regarding events that should be considered "Olympic". These additional events include the hacks and hunter combined event. (Mallon and de Wael had included this event in their Olympic lists.)

== Background ==
No equestrian events were held at the first modern Olympics in 1896. Five events, including this one, were featured in 1900. Only the show jumping competition would ever be held again after that; this was the only appearance of the hacks and hunter combined.

== Competition format ==
The contest consisted of performing both on the flat at various gaits as well as executing two low jumps. Competitors were scored for the quality of the execution of the routine.

== Schedule ==
Date	Time	Round
Thursday, 31 May 1900		Final

== Results ==
Rank	Rider	Nation	Horse
1st place, gold medalist(s)	Napoléon Murat	France	The General
2nd place, silver medalist(s)	Victor Archenoul	France	Retournelle
3rd place, bronze medalist(s)	Robert de Montesquiou	France	Grey Leg
4	Paul Haëntjens	France	Mavourneen
5–51	Maurice Jéhin	France	Biscuit
5–51	René Alfred Robert de Quincey	France	Cy Beau
5–51	Auguste Roy	France	Reine de Sabat
5–51	Louis de Champsavin	France	Terpsichore
5–51	Elvira Guerra	Italy	Libertin
5–51	Pierre Dillon	France	Duc d'Aoste
5–51	Georges de Lagarenne	France	Louqsor
5–51	Hermann Mandl	Austria	<Unknown>
5–51	Cordon	France	<Unknown>
5–51	Mathieu Marie de Lesseps	France	<Unknown>
5–51	Élie de Polyakov	Russian Empire	<Unknown>
5–51	Jane Moulin	France	<Unknown>
5–51	Georges Van Der Poele	Belgium	<Unknown>
5–51	Vigneulles	France	<Unknown>
5–51	Blanche de Marcigny	France	<Unknown>
5–51	de La Forgue de Bellegarde (Note: Son of Camille de La Forgue de Bellegarde.)	France	Staag
5–51	Maurice Foache	France	Fils d'Artois
5–51	Pierre Louis Alaret	France	<Unknown>
5–51	Charles Baveaux	France	<Unknown>
5–51	Marquis de Croix	France	Ronfleur
5–51	Louis d'Havrincourt	France	Bambocheur
5–51	Up to 26 more competitors		

== Sources ==
- International Olympic Committee medal winners database
- De Wael, Herman. Herman's Full Olympians: "Equestrian 1900". Accessed 19 January 2006. Available electronically at.
- Mallon, Bill (1998). The 1900 Olympic Games, Results for All Competitors in All Events, with Commentary. Jefferson, North Carolina: McFarland & Company, Inc., Publishers. ISBN 0-7864-0378-0.
- The Schoolmistress: Elvira Guerra-The forgotten female Olympic equestrian.
