= Elvira Guerra =

Italian equestrienne and circus performer

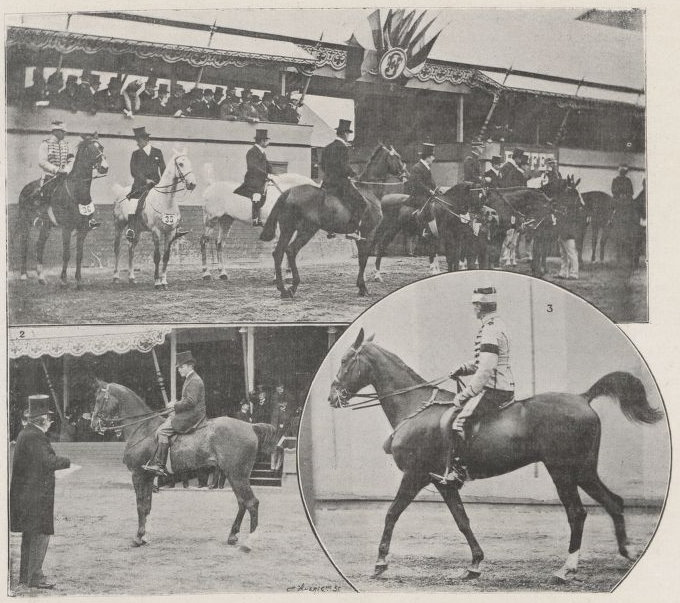
- Images from the hacks and hunter combined event at the 1900 Olympics.

Personal information
- Nationality: Italian
- Born: 2 December 1855; Saint Petersburg, Russian Empire
- Died: 26 October 1937 (aged 81); Marseille, France
- Occupation: Circus performer

Sport
- Country: Kingdom of Italy
- Sport: Equestrianism
- Event(s): Hack and Hunter

Achievements and titles
- Olympic finals: 1900

Elvira Guerra (Italian pronunciation: [elˈviːra ˈɡwɛrra]; 2 December 1855 – 26 October 1937) was an Italian equestrienne and circus performer, notable for competing at the 1900 Summer Olympics, the first Games at which women were allowed to compete. She was the first woman to represent Italy at the Olympics.

== Life ==
Guerra was born in Saint Petersburg around 1855, daughter of circus performer Rodolfo Guerra.

The Times mentions her in an 1882 article on Hengler's Grand Cirque. In 1890, she opened the Grand Hippodrome in Bordeaux.

In May 1900, she was one of three female riders who competed in the hacks and hunter combined (chevaux de selle) during the International Horse Show in Paris. The show was part of the Exposition Universelle, and the equestrian events were later classified as part of the 1900 Summer Olympics. Riding the horse Libertin, she finished outside the top four.

She died in Marseille in 1937. A street in Bordeaux is named Rue Elvira Guerra in her honour.
