= Geoffroy d'Andigné =

French politician

Count Geoffroy d'Andigné

Member of the Chamber of Deputies
- In office 11 May 1924 – 10 March 1932

Personal details
- Born: Geoffroy Charles François Marie; 11 February 1858 Sainte-Gemmes-d'Andigné, France
- Died: 10 March 1932 (aged 74) Angers, France
- Spouse: Hélène Chandon de Briailles (after 1885)

Military service
- Allegiance: France
- Unit: 28th Dragoon Regiment
- Battles/wars: World War I
- Awards: Croix de guerre 1914–1918, Médaille militaire

Geoffroy Charles François Marie, Count d'Andigné (11 February 1858 – 10 March 1932) was a French politician. He served as mayor of Sainte-Gemmes-d'Andigné, and as a general councillor and deputy of Maine-et-Loire.

== Personal life ==
Andigné was born on 11 February 1858 in Sainte-Gemmes-d'Andigné, Maine-et-Loire, a member of the Andigné family of French nobility. In 1885, he married Hélène Chandon de Briailles. Despite his advanced years, being 56 years old at the outbreak of World War I, he served in the army as a rider in the 28th Dragoon Regiment throughout. On his return he was awarded the Croix de guerre 1914–1918 and the Médaille militaire, in addition to being promoted as a non-commissioned officer. He died in Angers on 10 March 1932.

== Politics ==
Andigné was first elected as a general councillor in 1908. He was re-elected in 1918, and became mayor of Sainte-Gemmes-d'Andigné in 1919. In 1924, he was elected to the Chamber of Deputies as a deputy for Maine-et-Loire; he was re-elected in 1928 and sat until his death in 1932. During his time in parliament he was a member of the agriculture committee.

== Equestrian ==
In June 1900, Andigné competed in the equestrian mail coach event at the International Horse Show in Paris. The event was part of the Exposition Universelle, and later classified as part of the 1900 Summer Olympics.
