= Victor Archenoul =

French equestrian

- Born: Victor Marie Célestin François Archenoul; 16 December 1871; La Boussac, France
- Awards: Order of Agricultural Merit
- Sports career
- Sport: Equestrian
Medal record
Silver medal – second place	1900 Paris	Hacks and hunter

Victor Marie Célestin François Archenoul (Born 16 December 1871 in La Boussac – Died 10 December 1938 in Douarnenez) was a French equestrian. In 1923, while director of the dressage school in Caen, he was appointed officer of the Order of Agricultural Merit.

In June 1900, with his horse Retournelle, Archenoul was runner-up in the hacks and hunter (saddle horses) event during the International Horse Show in Paris. The event was part of the Exposition Universelle, and later was classified as part of the 1900 Summer Olympics.
