= Equestrian at the 1900 Summer Olympics – Individual jumping =

Equestrian at the Olympics

Show jumping at the Games of the II Olympiad
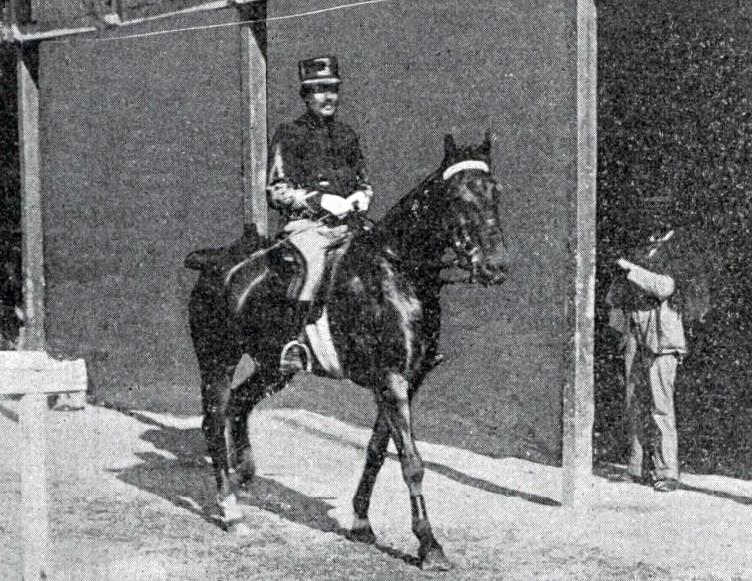
- Aimé Haegeman (1902)
- Venue: 7th arrondissement of Paris
- Date: 29 May
- Competitors: 37 from 5 nations
- Winning time: 2:16.0

Medalists
1st place, gold medalist(s)		Aimé Haegeman; Belgium
2nd place, silver medalist(s)		Georges Van Der Poele; Belgium
3rd place, bronze medalist(s)		Louis de Champsavin; France

Obstacle jumping was one of five equestrian competitions held in late May and early June 1900 at the International Horse Show in Paris. The event was part of the Exposition Universelle, and later classified as part of the 1900 Summer Olympics. It was similar to the modern show jumping event. 45 competitors entered, though only 37 competed, with some information unknown. The event was won by Aimé Haegeman of Belgium, with his countryman Georges Van Der Poele taking second and Louis de Champsavin of France in third.

== Background ==
This was the first appearance of the event, which has been held at every Summer Olympics at which equestrian sports have been featured (that is, excluding 1896, 1904, and 1908). It is the only event on the current programme that was held in 1900.

== Competition format ==
The course was 850 metres (2,790 ft) long with 22 jumps, including a double jump and a triple jump as well as a 4 metres (13 ft) water jump. The average height of the jumps was 1.1 metres (3 ft 7 in). Both military and non-military riders (and their mounts) were allowed to compete, excluding military school horses. The scoring format is not known. A single round was held. Riders could apparently compete multiple times on different horses.

== Schedule ==
Date	Time	Round
Tuesday, 29 May 1900		Final

== Results ==
Nothing is known of scores for faults; the winners were listed by reference to their times only.

Rank	Rider	Horse	Nation	Time
1st place, gold medalist(s)	Aimé Haegeman	Benton II	Belgium	2:16.0
2nd place, silver medalist(s)	Georges Van Der Poele	Windsor Squire	Belgium	2:17.6
3rd place, bronze medalist(s)	Louis de Champsavin	Terpsichore	France	2:26.0
4–37	Arthur Philippot	Floridor	France	Unknown
4–37	Louis d'Havrincourt	Mavourneen	France	Unknown
4–37	Henri Leclerc	Extra-Dry	France	Unknown
4–37	Henri Leclerc	Gilles	France	Unknown
4–37	Charles, Count de Béthune-Scully	Tip-Top	France	Unknown
4–37	Maurice Jéhin (Note: That Jéhin rode Bistouri, a horse which he owned, is presumed by de Wael.)	Bistouri	France	Unknown
4–37	Napoléon Murat (Note: De Wael notes that it is uncertain if Murat actually was the rider, but argues for it on the basis that Murat was the owner of Arcadius and is known to have ridden in other events.)	Arcadius	France	Unknown
4–37	Vigneulles	Unknown	France	Unknown
4–37	De Coulombier	Unknown	France	Unknown
4–37	d’Auzac de la Martinie	Unknown	France	Unknown
4–37	Paul Haëntjens	Unknown	France	Unknown
4–37	Dominique Gardères	Unknown	France	Unknown
4–37	Constant van Langhendonck	Unknown	Belgium	Unknown
4–37	Georges Kryn	Unknown	Belgium	Unknown
4–37	Eugène Poidebard	Unknown	France	Unknown
4–37	Hubert Dutech	Unknown	France	Unknown
4–37	Hermann Mandl	Unknown	Austria	Unknown
4–37	Charles van Langhendonck	Unknown	Belgium	DNF
4–37	16 other competitors			
DNS	Federico Caprilli	Mélopo	Italy	–
DNS	Federico Caprilli	Montebello	Italy	–
DNS	Ferdinand Po	Niniche	Italy	–

== Sources ==
- International Olympic Committee medal winners database
- De Wael, Herman. Herman's Full Olympians: "Equestrian 1900". Available electronically at. Accessed 29 July 2006.
- Mallon, Bill (1998). The 1900 Olympic Games, Results for All Competitors in All Events, with Commentary. Jefferson, North Carolina: McFarland & Company, Inc., Publishers. ISBN 0-7864-0378-0.
