= Georges Nagelmackers =

Belgian businessman (1845-1905)

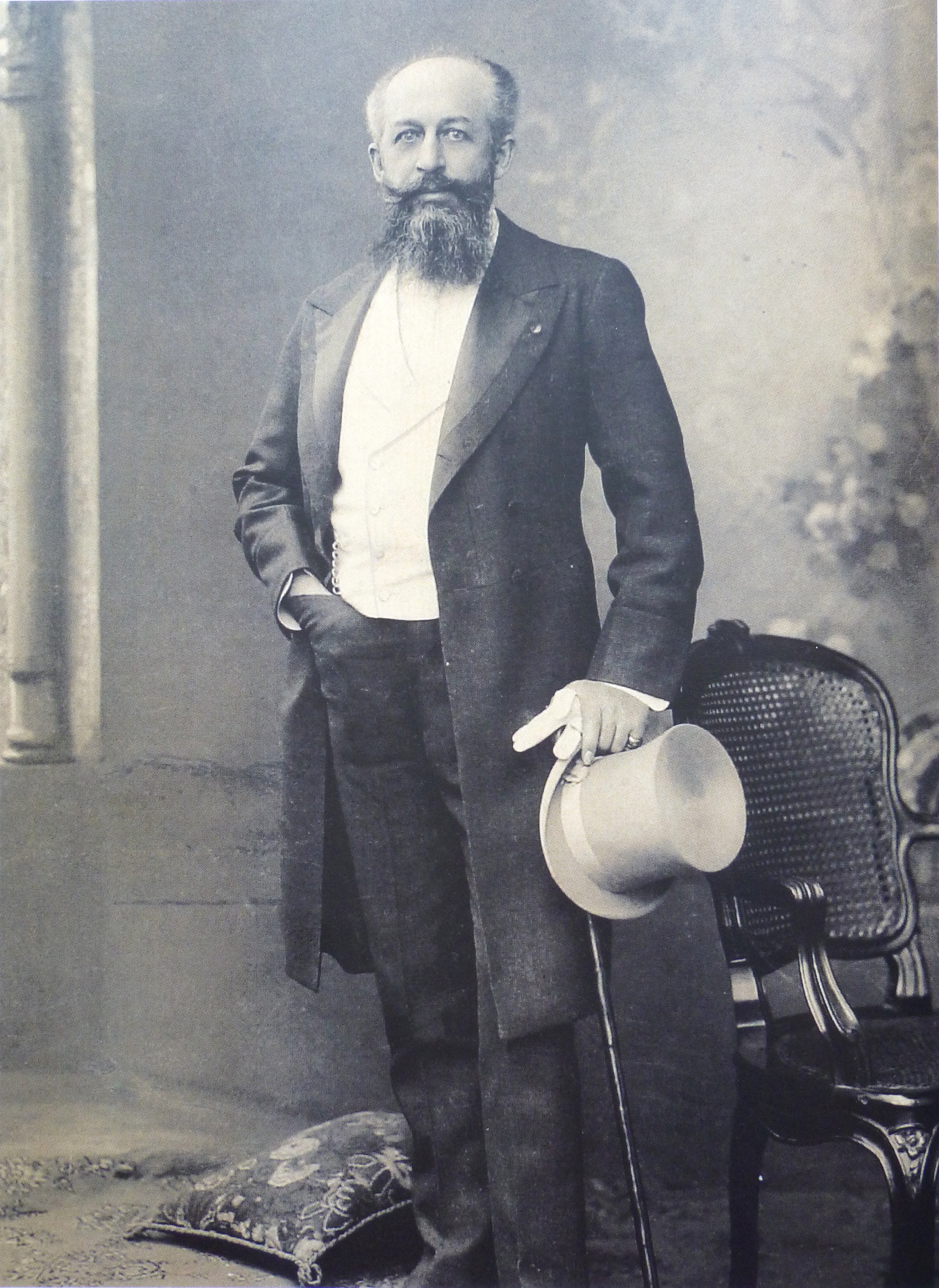
- Born: Georges Lambert Casimir Nagelmackers; 25 June 1845; Liège, Belgium
- Died: 10 August 1905 (aged 60); Villepreux, France
- Occupations: Civil engineer, businessman
- Known for: Compagnie Internationale des Wagons-Lits, Orient Express
- Sports career
- Nationality: Belgian
- Sport: Equestrian
Medal record
Olympic Games
Representing Belgium
Gold medal – first place	1900 Paris	Mail coach

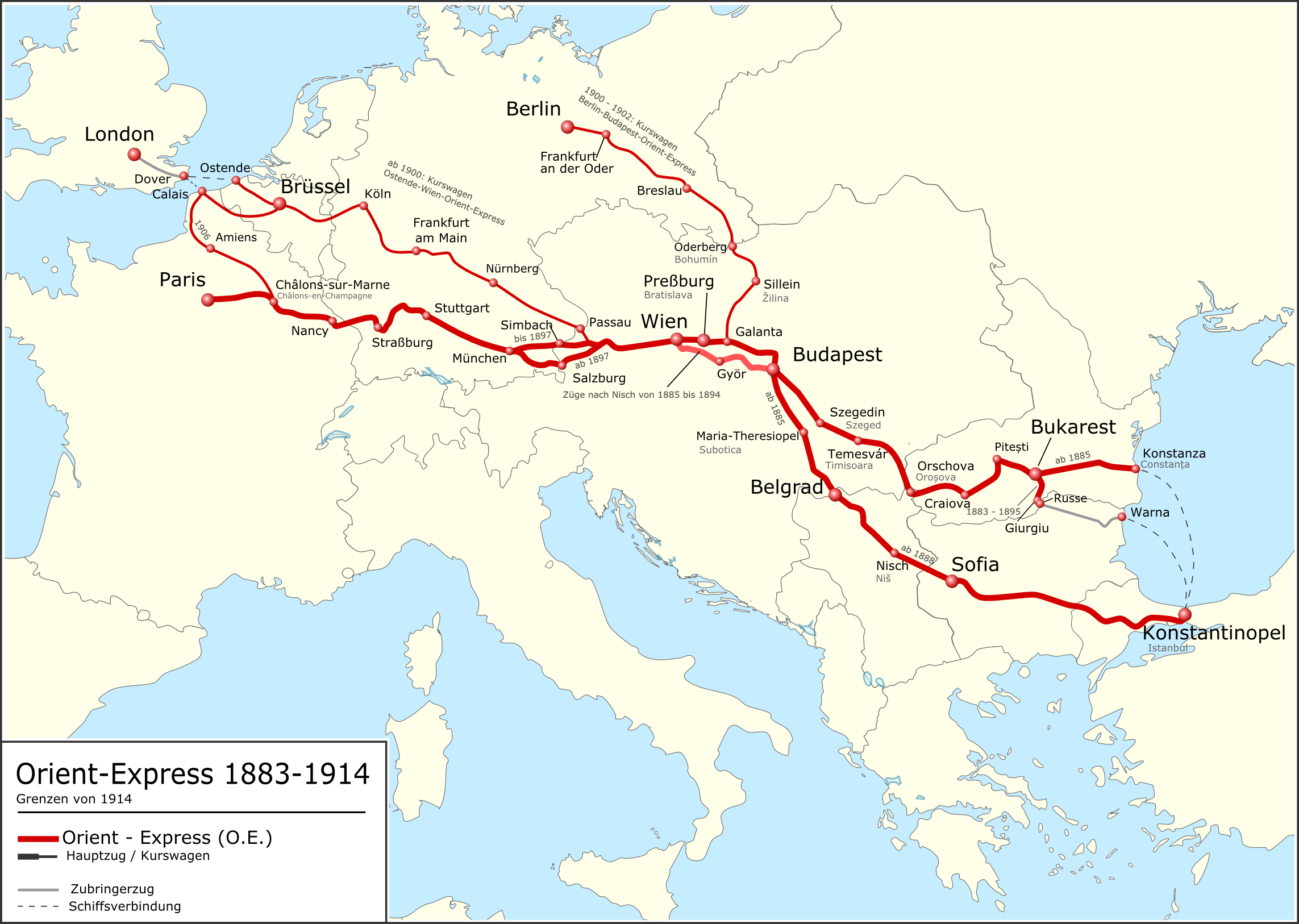
Route of the Orient Express from 1883 to 1914

Georges Lambert Casimir Nagelmackers (25 June 1845 – 10 August 1905) was a Belgian civil engineer and businessman, famous for founding the Compagnie Internationale des Wagons-Lits and creating the Orient Express.

== Early life ==
Nagelmackers was born on 25 June 1845 in Liège, Belgium. Born into a family of bankers with interests in railways and close links to the court of King Leopold II of Belgium, Georges Nagelmackers trained as a civil engineer.

As a young man he fell in love with an older cousin. When his feelings were not reciprocated, his family encouraged him to travel to the United States of America to help him recover and also further his professional studies.

== Career ==
While spending ten months travelling throughout America, he was exposed to train travel on Pullman carriages. He became convinced that there was a market for Pullman-type carriages in Europe. After a proposal to George Pullman to collaborate on developing the European market was rebuffed, Nagelmackers returned to Europe.

Other versions of his biography maintain that Georges Nagelmackers knew about sleeping cars as they were already in operation in Belgium before he traveled to the United States, and that he never actually met George Pullman.

In 1870 he published a proposal to develop sleeper carriages for the European market called "Projet d'Installation de wagons-lits sur les chemins de fer du continent" (Project for the installation of sleeping cars on the railways of the Continent). However, the outbreak of the Franco-Prussian War delayed the granting of a concession from the Belgian government and the establishment of his first sleeper-carriage service.

In 1872, Georges Nagelmackers founded the company Georges Nagelmackers & Company, which later became Compagnie Internationale des Wagons-Lits (CIWL). He headquartered the company in Paris and created the Compagnie Internationale des Grands Hotels to develop and operate luxury hotels along its trains' routes. His strategy consisted of convincing train operators to attach his sleeping and restaurant cars to their trains to diversify train travelers' choices. The first CIWL-only train became operational in 1882.

The Orient Express was launched 4 October 1883. Later, he bought the Mudanya–Bursa line and sold it to the French in 1891. He also bought the Smyrna–Kasaba Railway in 1893 and also sold it to the French the following year.

In June 1900, Nagelmackers won the four-in-hand (mail coach) driving event during the International Horse Show in Paris. The show was part of the Exposition Universelle, and the equestrian events were later classified as part of the 1900 Summer Olympics.

== Personal life ==
Nagelmackers was married to Sophie Françoise Marguerite Mermet (1848–1909). They were the parents of:

- René Nagelmackers (1878–1929), who married Alice Helen Dalziel (1876–1910), the only child of Davison Dalziel, 1st Baron Dalziel of Wooler. After her death in 1910, he married Gloria Monés-Maury, sister of Pedro Monés, Marquess of Casa Maury.

Nagelmackers died on 10 August 1905 in Villepreux, France, at the age of 60.

== See also ==
- Banque Nagelmackers
