= Equestrian at the 1900 Summer Olympics – Mail coach =

Equestrian at the Olympics

Equestrian mail coach at the Games of the II Olympiad
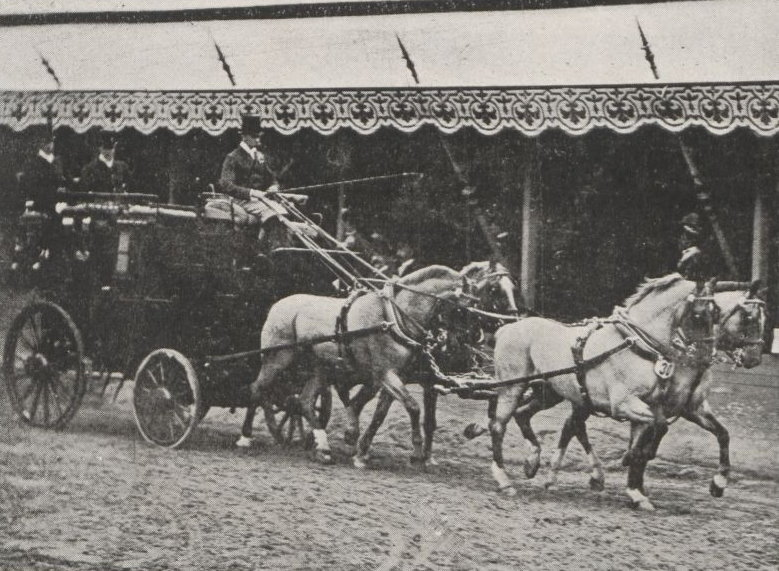
- Baron Étienne van Zuylen van Nyevelt at the equestrian mail coach competition
- Venue: 7th arrondissement of Paris
- Date: 2 June
- Competitors: 28 from 6 nations

Medalists
1st place, gold medalist(s)		Georges Nagelmackers; Belgium
2nd place, silver medalist(s)		Léon Thome; France
3rd place, bronze medalist(s)		Jean de Neuflize; France

The four-in-hand mail coach driving was one of five equestrian competitions held in late May and early June 1900 at the International Horse Show in Paris. The event was part of the Exposition Universelle, and later classified as part of the 1900 Summer Olympics. There were 31 entrants listed for the event; all 28 of them are known by name (three entered twice each). The event was won by the team of Georges Nagelmackers (one of the competitors who entered twice) of Belgium. The teams of Léon Thome and Jean de Neuflize, both of France, were classified in second and third place respectively.

Sources prior to 1996 often did not list this event as Olympic. The IOC website currently has affirmed a total of 95 medal events, after accepting, as it appears, the recommendation of Olympic historian Bill Mallon regarding events that should be considered "Olympic". These additional events include the mail coach event. (Mallon and de Wael had included this event in their Olympic lists.)

== Background ==
No equestrian events were held at the first modern Olympics in 1896. Five events, including this one, were featured in 1900. Only the show jumping competition would ever be held again after that; this was the only appearance of the mail coach event.

== Competition format ==
The contestants drove mail coaches drawn by four horses each, with the winners determined by a jury. Many of the coaches were driven by their owners. The event took place at the small Place de Breteuil, which was unable to accommodate all 31 coaches simultaneously.

== Schedule ==
Date	Time	Round
Saturday, 2 June 1900	14:00	Final

== Results ==
Very little is known about the results of the event.

Rank	Driver	Nation
1st place, gold medalist(s)	Georges Nagelmackers	Belgium
2nd place, silver medalist(s)	Léon Thome	France
3rd place, bronze medalist(s)	Jean de Neuflize	France
4	Philippe Vernes	France
5–31	Étienne van Zuylen van Nyevelt (Note: One of Étienne van Zuylen van Nyevelt's coaches was driven by Count de La Mazelière.)	Belgium
5–31	Étienne van Zuylen van Nyevelt	Belgium
5–31	Georges Nagelmackers	Belgium
5–31	Vladimir Nikolayevich Orlov	Russian Empire
5–31	Charles Eugène Amable de Veauce	France
5–31	Luis Antonio de Guadalmina	Spain
5–31	Élie de Polyakov	Russian Empire
5–31	Octave Gallice	France
5–31	Jacques la Caze	France
5–31	Jacques la Caze	France
5–31	James Hennessy	France
5–31	Gaston Saint-Paul de Sinçay	Belgium
5–31	Adrien de Noailles	France
5–31	Jacques de Waru	France
5–31	Bertrand Chanu	France
5–31	Geoffroy d'Andigné	France
5–31	Jacques d'Arlincourt	France
5–31	Georges Chaudoir	Belgium
5–31	Louis du Douet de Graville	France
5–31	Max Guilleaume	Germany
5–31	Paul Lambert	Belgium
5–31	Ferdinand de Lariboisière	France
5–31	Hermann Mandl	Austria
5–31	Orban	Belgium
5–31	Georges Pauwels	Belgium
5–31	Paul de Saint-Léger	France
5–31	Georges de Zogheb	Austria

== Sources ==
- International Olympic Committee medal winners database
- De Wael, Herman. Herman's Full Olympians: "Equestrian 1900". Accessed 19 January 2006. Available electronically at.
- Mallon, Bill (1998). The 1900 Olympic Games, Results for All Competitors in All Events, with Commentary. Jefferson, North Carolina: McFarland & Company, Inc., Publishers. ISBN 0-7864-0378-0.
