= Constant van Langhendonck =

Belgian equestrian

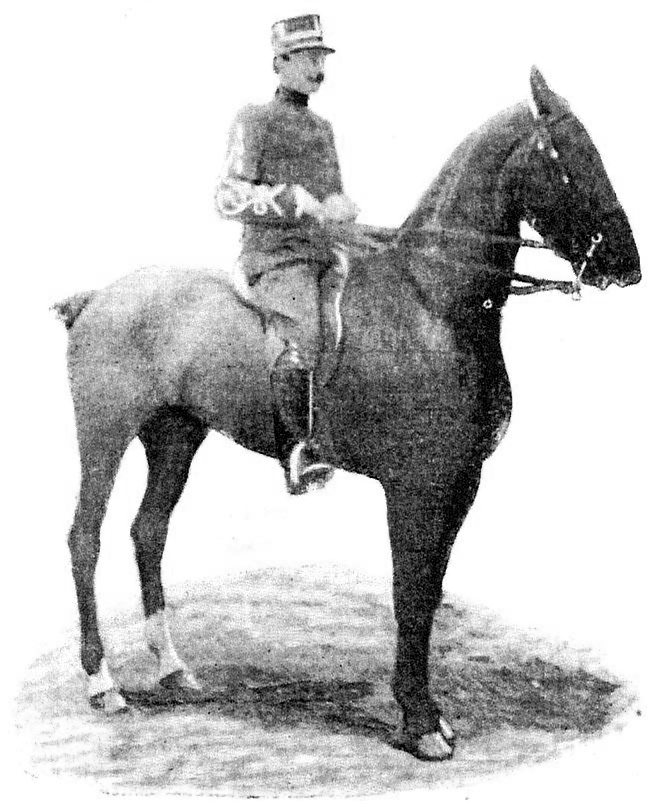

Medal record

Representing Belgium

Equestrian

Olympic Games
| Gold medal – first place | 1900 Paris | Long jump |

Constant Octave van Langhendonck (3 February 1870 in Muizen – 2 September 1944 in Brussels) was a Belgian horse rider and military officer.

In May–June 1900, he competed in the equestrian events during the International Horse Show in Paris. The show was part of the Exposition Universelle, and the equestrian events were later classified as part of the 1900 Summer Olympics. He won the long jump event with his horse Extra-Dry.
