= Gian Giorgio Trissino (equestrian) =

Italian horse rider

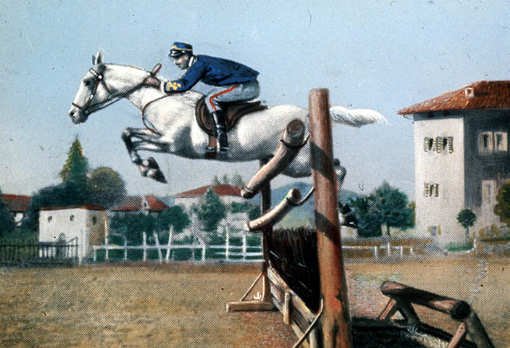
- Illustration of Trissino, c. 1920

Personal information
- Full name: Gian Giorgio Trissino dal Vello d'Oro
- Nationality: Italian
- Born: 22 July 1877 Vicenza, Italy
- Died: 22 December 1963 (aged 86) Milan, Italy

Sport
- Country: Italy
- Sport: Equestrian
- Event: Jumping
Medal record
Olympic Games
Gold medal – first place	1900 Paris	High jump
Silver medal – second place	1900 Paris	Long jump

Count Giovanni Giorgio Trissino (22 July 1877 – 22 December 1963) was an Italian horse rider who won Italy's first ever gold medal at the Olympic Games in Paris 1900.

== Biography ==
In Paris he tied to the gold medal in the high jump event with Dominique Gardères and was fourth in the same competition with a different horse. He also won a silver medal in the long jump event.

== The history of the Caprilli substitution ==
At the Summer Olympic Games in Paris 1900, in both competitions he won the two medals on the saddle of Oreste, a horse that was initially due to the great Federico Caprilli, his teacher, who, after sending his horses to France, was recalled by a telegram from the Ministry of War that forbade the expatriation to the military in career following the dissolution of the Chambers. This situation evidently was not well communicated to the judges of the race and this led to confusion to the point that in some books of gold it was erroneously indicated Caprilli in place of Trissino. According to some reconstructions Caprilli could indeed have reached Paris in disguise from Turin to complete the preparation of his horses, giving rise to fictional voices related to his active participation in competitions.

== Awards ==
On 7 May 2015, in the presence of the President of Italian National Olympic Committee (CONI), Giovanni Malagò, was inaugurated in the Olympic Park of the Foro Italico in Rome, along Viale delle Olimpiadi, the Walk of Fame of Italian sport, consisting of 100 tiles that chronologically report names of the most representative athletes in the history of Italian sport. On each tile are the name of the sportsman, the sport in which he distinguished himself and the symbol of CONI. The first tile is dedicated to Gian Giorgio Trissino precisely because of the conquest of the first Italian Olympic medal.

== See also ==
- Legends of Italian sport - Walk of Fame
- Trissino family
