= Dominique Gardères =

French equestrian

Medal record

Equestrian

Representing France

Olympic Games
Gold medal – first place	1900 Paris	High jump

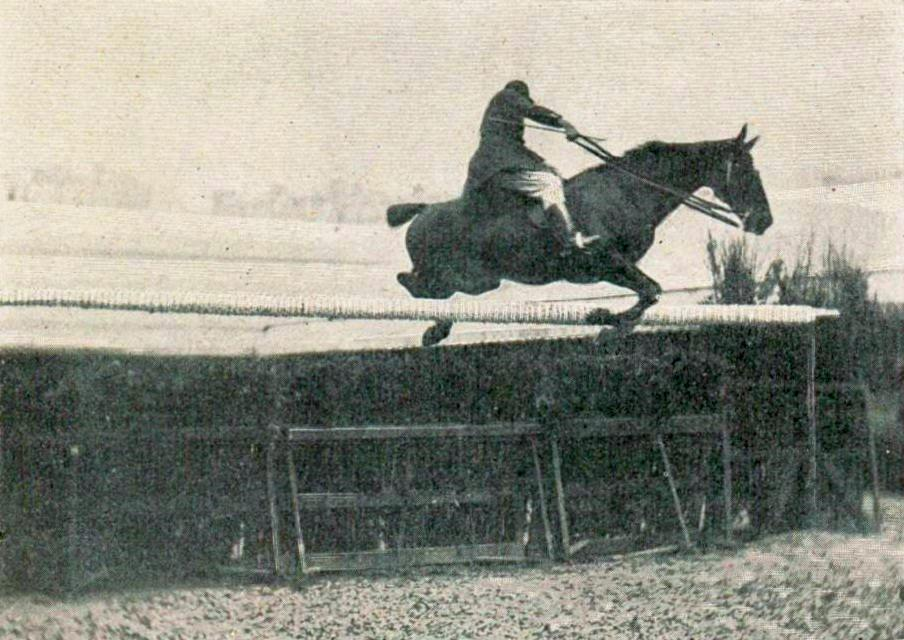

Dominique Maximilien Gardères (born 22 October 1856 in Biarritz, date of death unknown) was a French horse rider who competed in the 1900 Olympic Games. In Paris he tied to the gold medal in the high jump event with Gian Giorgio Trissino.
