= Equestrian at the 1900 Summer Olympics – Long jump =

Equestrian at the Olympics

Equestrian long jump at the Games of the II Olympiad
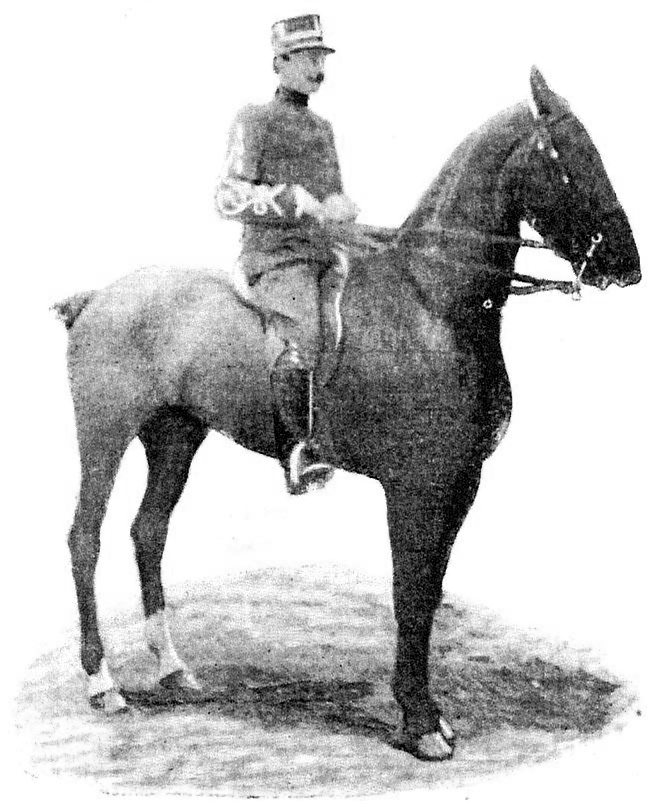
- Gold medalist Constant van Langhendonck
- Venue: 7th arrondissement of Paris
- Date: 31 May
- Competitors: 17 from 5 nations
- Winning distance: 6.10 metres

Medalists
1st place, gold medalist(s)		Constant van Langhendonck; Belgium
2nd place, silver medalist(s)		Gian Giorgio Trissino; Italy
3rd place, bronze medalist(s)		Jacques de Prunelé; France

The long jump was one of five equestrian competitions held in late May and early June 1900 at the International Horse Show in Paris. The event was part of the Exposition Universelle, and later classified as part of the 1900 Summer Olympics. It is the only Olympic Games to feature an equestrian long jump competition. Of the seventeen competitors who entered, around half are known by name. The event was won by Constant van Langhendonck of Belgium, with Gian Giorgio Trissino of Italy in second and Jacques de Prunelé of France in third.

== Background ==
No equestrian events were held at the first modern Olympics in 1896. Five events, including this one, were featured in 1900. Only the show jumping competition would ever be held again after that; this was the only appearance of the long jump.

== Competition format ==
The competition format was more like a human high jump than long jump, with competitors trying to clear a fixed distance that increased with each success rather than simply jumping and measuring the distance. The equestrian long jump involved trying to clear a water jump with the take-off point moved further back each time the jump was made. The distance began at 4.50 metres, increasing gradually to 4.90 metres. Remaining riders at that point could choose subsequent distances.

== Schedule ==
Date	Time	Round
Thursday, 31 May 1900		Final

== Results ==
All 17 competitors managed to jump 4.50 metres (14.8 ft), but several were eliminated at 4.90 metres (16.1 ft). The winning jump of 6.10 metres (20.0 ft) was considered unimpressive, but was in part due to heavy ground caused by rain earlier on the day of the competition. The silver medal was won by an Italian competitor Gian Giorgio Trissino, who also won the joint gold medal in the Equestrian high jump competition.

Rank	Rider	Nation	Horse	Distance
1st place, gold medalist(s)	Constant van Langhendonck	Belgium	Extra-Dry	6.10
2nd place, silver medalist(s)	Gian Giorgio Trissino	Italy	Oreste	5.70
3rd place, bronze medalist(s)	Jacques de Prunelé	France	Tolla	5.30
4	Napoléon Murat	France	Bayard	4.90
5	Henri Plocque	France	Camelia	Unknown
6	van der Meulen	Belgium	The Wett	Unknown
7–17	Uberto Visconti di Modrone	Italy	Jupe-en-l'Air	Unknown
7–17	Hermann Mandl	Austria	Unknown	Unknown
7–17	Vladimir Nikolayevich Orlov	Russian Empire	Unknown	Unknown
7–17	Élie de Polyakov	Russian Empire	Unknown	Unknown
7–17	7 unknown combinations			Unknown

== Sources ==
- International Olympic Committee medal winners database
- De Wael, Herman. Herman's Full Olympians: "Equestrian 1900". Available electronically at . Accessed July 29, 2015.
- Mallon, Bill (1998). The 1900 Olympic Games, Results for All Competitors in All Events, with Commentary. Jefferson, North Carolina: McFarland & Company, Inc., Publishers. ISBN 0-7864-0378-0.
