= Aimé Haegeman =

Belgian equestrian (1861–1935)

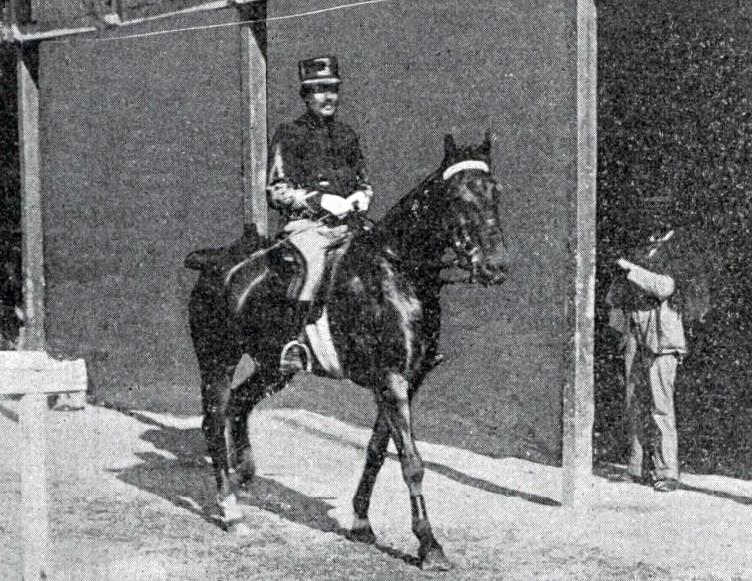
- Haegeman in 1902
- Born: Aimé Joseph Haegeman; 19 October 1861; Stabroek, Belgium
- Died: 19 September 1935 (aged 73); Etterbeek, Belgium
- Military career
- Allegiance: Belgium
- Unit: Lancers Regiment
- Sports career
- Country: Belgium
- Sport: Equestrian
Medal record
Gold medal – first place	1900 Paris	Jumping event

Aimé Joseph Haegeman (19 October 1861 – 19 September 1935) was a Belgian military officer and horse rider.

Haegeman was an officer in the Lancers Regiment and an instructor at the École de cavalerie d'Ypres.

In May 1900, he competed in the equestrian events during the International Horse Show in Paris. The show was part of the Exposition Universelle, and the equestrian events were later classified as part of the 1900 Summer Olympics. With his horse, Benton II, he won the jumping event.
