= Louis de Champsavin =

French equestrian (1867–1916)

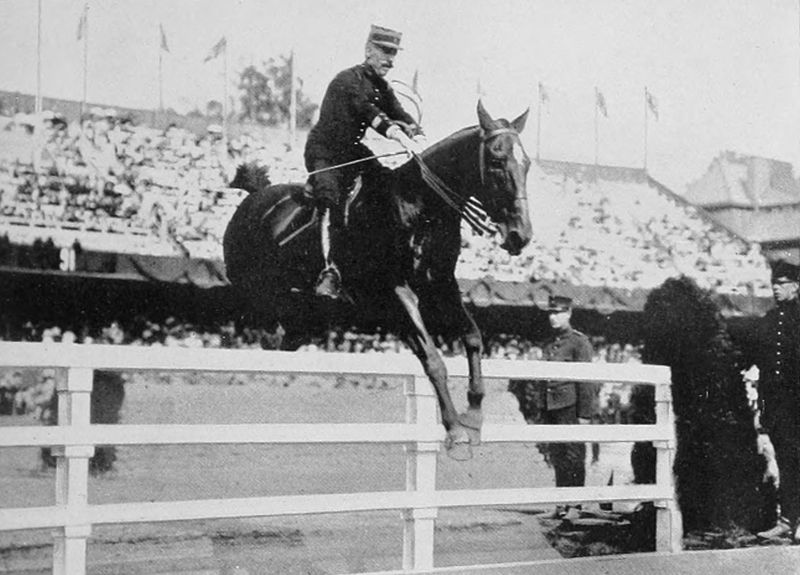

Personal details
- Born: Louis Marie Joseph Le Beschu de Champsavin; 24 November 1867 Assérac, France
- Died: 20 December 1916 (aged 49) Nantes, France
- Spouse: Amelie Clemence (after 1894)
- Civilian awards: Chevalier of the Légion d'honneur, Chevalier of the Order of Agricultural Merit

Military service
- Allegiance: France
- Rank: Chef d'escadron
- Unit: 24th Dragoon Regiment; 20th Cavalry Regiment
- Battles/wars: World War I (Battle of Verdun)
- Military awards: Croix de guerre 1914–1918
- Sports career
- Nationality: French
- Sport: Equestrian
Medal record
Bronze medal – third place	1900 Paris	Jumping event

Louis Marie Joseph Le Beschu de Champsavin (24 November 1867 – 20 December 1916) was a French military officer and horse rider.

== Personal life ==
Champsavin was born in Assérac on 24 November 1867. In 1894, he married Amelie Clemence.

Champsavin was appointed a Chevalier of the Légion d'honneur and Chevalier of the Order of Agricultural Merit.

== Military career ==
Champsavin began his military education at École spéciale militaire de Saint-Cyr in 1887. From there he went to the Saumur Cavalry School. On graduating he joined the 24th Dragoon Regiment in 1891 as sub-lieutenant. He was promoted to lieutenant in 1892.

Between 1899 and 1903, he was a riding instructor at Saint-Cyr. He was promoted to captain in 1903, and chef d'escadron in 1913.

During World War I Champsavin led the 20th Cavalry Regiment and came to command Fort Tavannes during the Battle of Verdun. The many gas shells that fell on the fort during this time caused his health to deteriorate, and he died in hospital in Nantes on 20 December 1916. He was awarded the Croix de Guerre.

== Equestrian ==
In May and June 1900, Champsavin competed in the International Horse Show in Paris. The events were part of the Exposition Universelle, and later classified as part of the 1900 Summer Olympics. Aboard his horse, Terpsichore, he finished third in the jumping event, and was among the rosette winners outside the leading places in the hacks and hunter event.

== See also ==
- List of Olympians killed in World War I
