= Georges Van Der Poele =

Belgian equestrian

Medal record

Equestrian

Representing Belgium

Olympic Games
Silver medal – second place	1900 Paris	Show jumping
Bronze medal – third place	1900 Paris	High jump

Georges Van Der Poele (23 March 1868 – 1944) was a Belgian equestrian and Olympic medalist.

In May 1900, Van Der Poele competed in the equestrian events during the International Horse Show in Paris. The show was part of the Exposition Universelle, and the equestrian events were later classified as part of the 1900 Summer Olympics. He came second in the show jumping event with Windsor Squire, and third in the high jump with Ludlow, a horse owned by Baron Carlo de Marchi. (Note: Some sources identify André Moreau as the rider of Ludlow.)
