= Equestrian at the 1952 Summer Olympics – Individual eventing =

Equeatrian at the Olympics

Individual eventing at the Games of the XV Olympiad
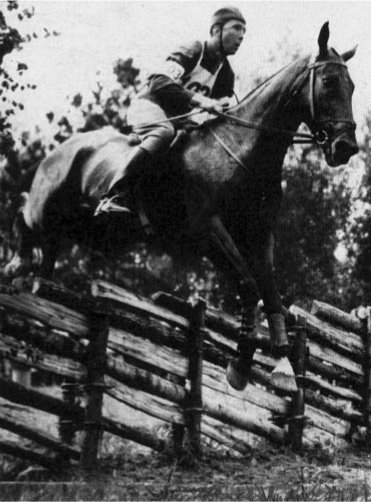
- Hans von Blixen-Finecke Jr. and Jubal
- Venue: Laakso; Ruskeasuo Equestrian Hall; Helsinki Olympic Stadium
- Date: 30 July – 2 August 1952
- Competitors: 59 from 21 nations

Medalists
1st place, gold medalist(s)		Hans von Blixen-Finecke Jr.	Sweden
2nd place, silver medalist(s)		Guy Lefrant	France
3rd place, bronze medalist(s)		Wilhelm Büsing	Germany

The individual eventing in equestrian at the 1952 Olympic Games in Helsinki was held from 30 July to 2 August. Only 34 of the 59 starters were able to finish the competition, with 20 being disqualified in the cross-country, 3 more retiring during that phase, and 2 being disqualified in the jumping.

== Competition format ==
The team and individual eventing competitions used the same scores. Eventing consisted of a dressage test, a cross-country test, and a jumping test. The competitor with the best total score (fewest penalty points) won.

- Dressage: The eventing competition featured a 12-minute dressage test. The maximum score was 400. Points could be lost for performance as well as time (0.5 points per second over the time limit). Competitors losing more than 200 points were disqualified.
- Cross-country: The cross-country test had five phases.
  - Phase A: 7 km roads. Time allowed was 29 minutes, 10 seconds (240 m/min). Time penalties were 5 points per each 5 seconds or fraction thereof over the time limit.
  - Phase B: 4 km steeplechase. Time allowed was 6 minutes, 40 seconds (600 m/min). Time penalties were 10 points per each 5 seconds or fraction thereof over the time limit. Time bonuses were 3 points per each 5 seconds or fraction thereof under the time limit (maximum 36 points gained). Obstacle faults were 20, 40, 60, or 80 points, or disqualification.
  - Phase C: 15 km roads. Time allowed was 62 minutes, 30 seconds (240 m/min). Time penalties were 5 points per each 5 seconds or fraction thereof over the time limit.
  - Phase D: 8 km cross-country. Time allowed was 17 minutes, 46 seconds (450 m/min). Time penalties were 10 points per each 5 seconds or fraction thereof over the time limit. Time bonuses were 3 points per each 5 seconds or fraction thereof under the time limit (maximum 72 points gained). Obstacle faults were 20, 40, 60, or 80 points, or disqualification. There were 34 obstacles.
  - Phase E: 2 km flat. Time allowed was 6 minutes (333 m/min). Time penalties were 5 points per each 5 seconds or fraction thereof over the time limit.
- Jumping: The jumping test had 12 obstacles and was set to a speed of 400 m/min. Time penalties were 0.25 points per second or fraction of a second over the time limit. Fault penalties were 10, 20, or points, or disqualification.

== Results ==
=== Standings after dressage ===
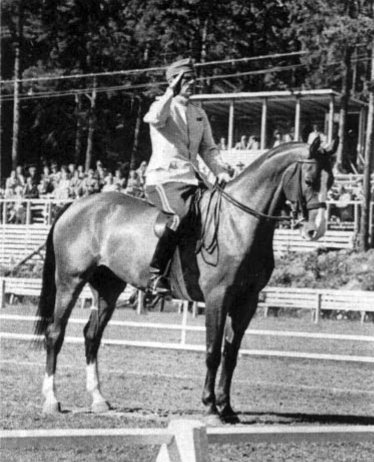
Leaders after dressage, Mauno Roiha and Laaos

Rank	Rider	Horse	Nation	Dressage
1	Mauno Roiha	Laaos	Finland	-84.00
2	Wilhelm Büsing	Hubertus	Germany	-103.50
3	Olof Stahre	Komet	Sweden	-108.66
4	Lucio Manzin	Golden Mount	Italy	-108.80
5	Klaus Wagner	Dachs	Germany	-109.66
6	Salvatore Oppes	Champagne	Italy	-110.33
7	Charles Hough Jr.	Cassivellannus	United States	-111.66
8	Folke Frölén	Fair	Sweden	-118.20
9	Piero D'Inzeo	Pagoro	Italy	-118.80
10	Aage Rubæk-Nielsen	Sahara	Denmark	-119.00
11	Guy Lefrant	Verdun	France	-119.50
12	Hans Schwarzenbach	Vae Victis	Switzerland	-121.66
12	Otto Mønsted Acthon	Sirdar	Denmark	-121.66
14	Hans von Blixen-Finecke Jr.	Jubal	Sweden	-123.33
15	André de la Simone	Baccus	France	-124.50
16	Carlos Villanueva	San Luis	Argentina	-124.66
17	Veikko Vartiainen	Sabina	Finland	-126.00
18	Bertie Hill	Stella	Great Britain	-126.33
18	Werner Kilcher	Voilette	Switzerland	-126.33
20	Max van Loon	Nerantsoula	Netherlands	-127.33
21	Ernest van Loon	Ampėre	Netherlands	-128.80
22	Pedro Mercado	Mandinga	Argentina	-130.80
23	Hernán Vigil	Naftol	Chile	-132.80
24	Charles-Philbert de Couët de Lorry	Moskito III	France	-133.50
25	Yury Andreyev	Logovoj	Soviet Union	-135.00
26	Laurence Rook	Starlight XV	Great Britain	-137.33
27	Valerian Kuybyshev	Perekop	Soviet Union	-139.00
28	Boris Lilov	Zagib	Soviet Union	-139.50
29	Hans Christian Andersen	Tom	Denmark	-142.20
30	Nicolae Mihalcea	Ghibelin	Romania	-145.20
31	Reg Hindley	Speculation	Great Britain	-145.80
32	John Wofford	Benny Grimes	United States	-146.00
33	Mario Leuenberg	Micho	Chile	-148.66
34	Jorge Canaves	Yatay	Argentina	-150.66
35	Joaquín Nogueras	Blason	Spain	-151.33
36	Mark Darley	Emily Little	Ireland	-152.66
37	Wiel Hendrickx	Patrick	Netherlands	-153.33
38	Rashko Fratev	Stalingrade	Bulgaria	-156.20
39	Mario Becerril	Tamaulipas	Mexico	-156.33
40	Fernando Cavaleiro	Caudel	Portugal	-159.00
41	Ilmari Haimi	Keija	Finland	-160.50
42	Jörg Ziegler	Vanna	Switzerland	-161.00
43	Ian Hume-Dudgeon	Hope	Ireland	-162.20
44	Rolando Mosqueira	Trelaros	Chile	-163.80
45	Larry McGuinness	Tara	Canada	-171.33
46	Mihai Timu	Cornet	Romania	-171.66
47	Henry Stewart Treviranus	Rustum	Canada	-172.00
48	Krastyo Gochev	Stratsine	Bulgaria	-172.80
49	António de Almeida	Florentina	Portugal	-173.20
50	Walter Staley	Craigwood Park	United States	-173.50
51	Joaquim Silva	Faial	Portugal	-173.80
52	Pericles Cavalcanti	Destino	Brazil	-175.50
53	Stoyan Rogachev	Lérine	Bulgaria	-178.50
54	Thomas Gayford	Constellation	Canada	-180.50
55	Petre Andreanu	Ciurlan	Romania	-182.00
56	Harry Freeman-Jackson	Cuchulain	Ireland	-183.66
57	Beltrán de Albuquerque	Huron	Spain	-186.00
58	Otto Rothe	Trux von Kamax	Germany	-186.33
59	Fernando López	Amado Mio	Spain	-190.33

=== Standings after cross-country ===
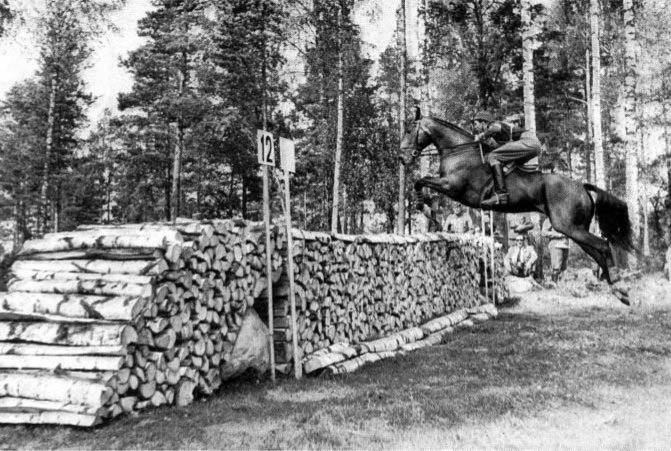
Hans von Blixen-Finecke Jr. and Jubal

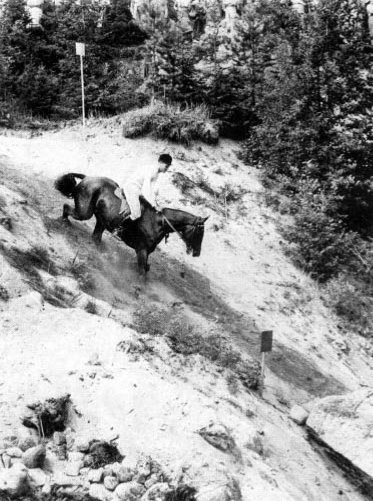
Wilhelm Büsing and Hubertus

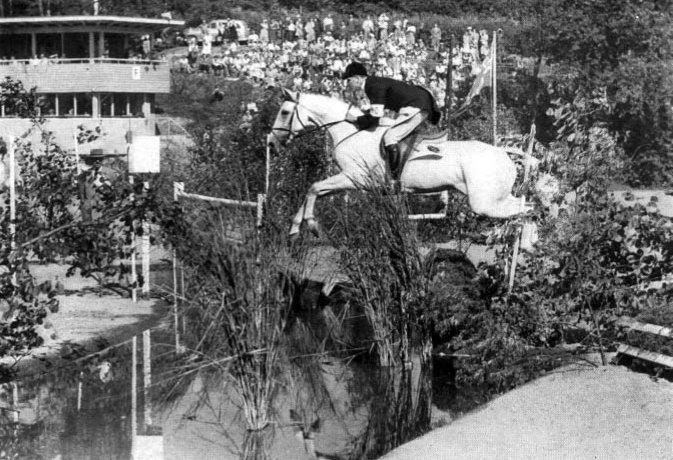
Reg Hindley and Speculation

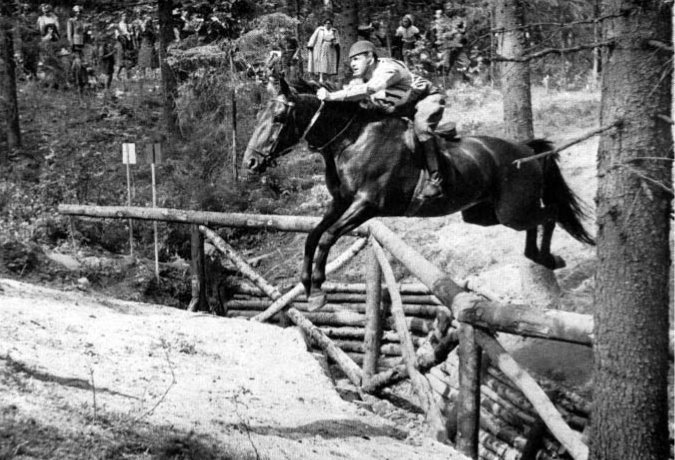
Hans Christian Andersen and Tom

Rank	Rider	Horse	Nation	Dressage	Cross-country						Total
Rank	Rider	Horse	Nation	Dressage	Points lost			Points gained			Total
Rank	Rider	Horse	Nation	Dressage	Obstacles	Time	Total	Stage B	Stage D	Total	Total
1	Hans von Blixen-Finecke Jr.	Jubal	Sweden	-123.33	0	0	0	36	69	105	-18.33
2	Olof Stahre	Komet	Sweden	-108.66	0	0	0	30	51	81	-27.66
3	Guy Lefrant	Verdun	France	-119.50	0	0	0	36	39	75	-44.50
4	Pedro Mercado	Mandinga	Argentina	-130.80	0	0	0	27	51	78	-52.80
5	Wilhelm Büsing	Hubertus	Germany	-103.50	0	0	0	21	27	48	-55.50
6	Klaus Wagner	Dachs	Germany	-109.66	0	15	15	30	39	69	-55.66
7	Bertie Hill	Stella	Great Britain	-126.33	0	0	0	33	36	69	-57.33
8	Charles Hough Jr.	Cassivellannus	United States	-111.66	0	0	0	36	15	51	-60.66
9	Valerian Kuybyshev	Perekop	Soviet Union	-139.00	0	0	0	36	39	75	-64.00
10	Piero D'Inzeo	Pagoro	Italy	-118.80	20	0	20	36	36	72	-66.80
11	Beltrán de Albuquerque	Huron	Spain	-186.00	0	0	0	33	45	78	-108.00
12	Mario Leuenberg	Micho	Chile	-148.66	20	0	20	36	21	57	-111.66
13	Reg Hindley	Speculation	Great Britain	-145.80	20	0	20	36	18	54	-111.80
14	Folke Frölén	Fair	Sweden	-118.20	80	0	80	36	48	84	-114.20
15	Otto Rothe	Trux von Kamax	Germany	-186.33	0	0	0	30	42	72	-114.33
16	Jörg Ziegler	Vanna	Switzerland	-161.00	20	0	20	30	24	54	-127.00
17	Hans Schwarzenbach	Vae Victis	Switzerland	-121.66	60	0	60	27	9	36	-145.66
18	Walter Staley	Craigwood Park	United States	-173.50	20	0	20	33	12	45	-148.50
19	Fernando Cavaleiro	Caudel	Portugal	-159.00	80	0	80	33	33	66	-173.00
20	Hans Christian Andersen	Tom	Denmark	-142.20	60	10	70	30	0	30	-182.20
21	André de la Simone	Baccus	France	-124.50	120	0	120	36	15	51	-193.50
22	Mario Becerril	Tamaulipas	Mexico	-156.33	60	10	70	30	0	30	-196.33
23	Henry Stewart Treviranus	Rustum	Canada	-172.00	0	60	60	30	3	33	-199.00
24	António de Almeida	Florentina	Portugal	-173.20	100	0	100	33	24	57	-216.20
25	Joaquim Silva	Faial	Portugal	-173.80	20	40	60	15	0	15	-218.80
26	Harry Freeman-Jackson	Cuchulain	Ireland	-183.66	100	0	100	36	9	45	-238.66
27	Otto Mønsted Acthon	Sirdar	Denmark	-121.66	0	150	150	24	0	24	-247.66
28	Ian Hume-Dudgeon	Hope	Ireland	-162.20	20	100	120	33	0	33	-249.20
29	Aage Rubæk-Nielsen	Sahara	Denmark	-119.00	80	150	230	30	0	30	-319.00
30	Larry McGuinness	Tara	Canada	-171.33	0	190	190	36	0	36	-325.33
31	John Wofford	Benny Grimes	United States	-146.00	20	190	210	18	0	18	-338.00
32	Mihai Timu	Cornet	Romania	-171.66	20	190	210	21	0	21	-360.66
33	Ilmari Haimi	Keija	Finland	-160.50	80	130	210	0	3	3	-367.50
34	Mark Darley	Emily Little	Ireland	-152.66	80	200	280	27	0	27	-405.66
35	Fernando López	Amado Mio	Spain	-190.33	60	220	280	12	0	12	-458.33
36	Rolando Mosqueira	Trelaros	Chile	-163.80	20	300	320	15	0	15	-468.80
–	Mauno Roiha	Laaos	Finland	-84.00	Disqualified						DSQ
–	Lucio Manzin	Golden Mount	Italy	-108.80	Disqualified						DSQ
–	Salvatore Oppes	Champagne	Italy	-110.33	Disqualified						DSQ
–	Carlos Villanueva	San Luis	Argentina	-124.66	Did not finish						DNF
–	Veikko Vartiainen	Sabina	Finland	-126.00	Disqualified						DSQ
–	Werner Kilcher	Voilette	Switzerland	-126.33	Disqualified						DSQ
–	Max van Loon	Nerantsoula	Netherlands	-127.33	Disqualified						DSQ
–	Ernest van Loon	Ampėre	Netherlands	-128.80	Disqualified						DSQ
–	Hernán Vigil	Naftol	Chile	-132.80	Did not finish						DNF
–	Charles-Philbert de Couët de Lorry	Moskito III	France	-133.50	Disqualified						DSQ
–	Yury Andreyev	Logovoj	Soviet Union	-135.00	Disqualified						DSQ
–	Laurence Rook	Starlight XV	Great Britain	-137.33	Disqualified						DSQ
–	Boris Lilov	Zagib	Soviet Union	-139.50	Disqualified						DSQ
–	Nicolae Mihalcea	Ghibelin	Romania	-145.20	Disqualified						DSQ
–	Jorge Canaves	Yatay	Argentina	-150.66	Disqualified						DSQ
–	Joaquín Nogueras	Blason	Spain	-151.33	Did not finish						DNF
–	Wiel Hendrickx	Patrick	Netherlands	-153.33	Disqualified						DSQ
–	Rashko Fratev	Stalingrade	Bulgaria	-156.20	Disqualified						DSQ
–	Krastyo Gochev	Stratsine	Bulgaria	-172.80	Disqualified						DSQ
–	Pericles Cavalcanti	Destino	Brazil	-175.50	Disqualified						DSQ
–	Stoyan Rogachev	Lérine	Bulgaria	-178.50	Disqualified						DSQ
–	Thomas Gayford	Constellation	Canada	-180.50	Disqualified						DSQ
–	Petre Andreanu	Ciurlan	Romania	-182.00	Disqualified						DSQ

=== Final results after jumping ===
Rank	Rider	Horse	Nation	Dressage	Cross-country	Jumping			Total
Rank	Rider	Horse	Nation	Dressage	Cross-country	Points lost			Total
Rank	Rider	Horse	Nation	Dressage	Cross-country	Obstacles	Time	Total	Total
1st place, gold medalist(s)	Hans von Blixen-Finecke Jr.	Jubal	Sweden	-123.33	105	10	0	10	-28.33
2nd place, silver medalist(s)	Guy Lefrant	Verdun	France	-119.50	75	10	0	10	-54.50
3rd place, bronze medalist(s)	Wilhelm Büsing	Hubertus	Germany	-103.50	48	0	0	0	-55.50
4	Pedro Mercado	Mandinga	Argentina	-130.80	78	10	0	10	-62.80
5	Klaus Wagner	Dachs	Germany	-109.66	54	10	0	10	-65.66
6	Piero D'Inzeo	Pagoro	Italy	-118.80	52	0	0	0	-66.80
7	Bertie Hill	Stella	Great Britain	-126.33	69	10	0	10	-67.33
8	Olof Stahre	Komet	Sweden	-108.66	81	40	1.75	41.75	-69.41
9	Charles Hough Jr.	Cassivellannus	United States	-111.66	51	10	0	10	-70.66
10	Valerian Kuybyshev	Perekop	Soviet Union	-139.00	75	20	0	20	-84.00
11	Otto Rothe	Trux von Kamax	Germany	-186.33	72	0	0	0	-114.33
12	Beltrán de Albuquerque	Huron	Spain	-186.00	78	10	0	10	-118.00
13	Reg Hindley	Speculation	Great Britain	-145.80	34	10	0	10	-121.80
14	Mario Leuenberg	Micho	Chile	-148.66	37	10	2.50	12.50	-124.16
15	Folke Frölén	Fair	Sweden	-118.20	4	10	0	10	-124.20
16	Jörg Ziegler	Vanna	Switzerland	-161.00	34	20	0	20	-147.00
17	Hans Schwarzenbach	Vae Victis	Switzerland	-121.66	-24	10	0	10	-155.66
18	Walter Staley	Craigwood Park	United States	-173.50	25	20	0	20	-168.50
19	Fernando Cavaleiro	Caudel	Portugal	-159.00	-14	10	0	10	-183.00
20	André de la Simone	Baccus	France	-124.50	-69	0	0	0	-193.50
21	Mario Becerril	Tamaulipas	Mexico	-156.33	-40	0	0	0	-196.33
22	Henry Stewart Treviranus	Rustum	Canada	-172.00	-27	0	0	0	-199.00
23	António de Almeida	Florentina	Portugal	-173.20	-43	0	0	0	-216.20
24	Joaquim Silva	Faial	Portugal	-173.80	-45	0	0	0	-218.80
25	Hans Christian Andersen	Tom	Denmark	-142.20	-30	40	0	40	-222.20
26	Otto Mønsted Acthon	Sirdar	Denmark	-121.66	-126	20	0	20	-267.66
27	Harry Freeman-Jackson	Cuchulain	Ireland	-183.66	-55	30	0	30	-268.66
28	Ian Hume-Dudgeon	Hope	Ireland	-162.20	-87	20	0	20	-269.20
29	Larry McGuinness	Tara	Canada	-171.33	-154	0	0	0	-325.33
30	Aage Rubæk-Nielsen	Sahara	Denmark	-119.00	-200	20	0	20	-339.00
31	John Wofford	Benny Grimes	United States	-146.00	-192	10	0	10	-348.00
32	Ilmari Haimi	Keija	Finland	-160.50	-207	40	0	40	-407.50
33	Mark Darley	Emily Little	Ireland	-152.66	-253	10	0	10	-415.66
34	Fernando López	Amado Mio	Spain	-190.33	-268	20	0	20	-478.33
–	Mihai Timu	Cornet	Romania	-171.66	-189	Disqualified			DSQ
–	Rolando Mosqueira	Trelaros	Chile	-163.80	-305	Disqualified			DSQ
–	Mauno Roiha	Laaos	Finland	-84.00	Disqualified				DSQ
–	Lucio Manzin	Golden Mount	Italy	-108.80	Disqualified				DSQ
–	Salvatore Oppes	Champagne	Italy	-110.33	Disqualified				DSQ
–	Carlos Villanueva	San Luis	Argentina	-124.66	Did not finish				DNF
–	Veikko Vartiainen	Sabina	Finland	-126.00	Disqualified				DSQ
–	Werner Kilcher	Voilette	Switzerland	-126.33	Disqualified				DSQ
–	Max van Loon	Nerantsoula	Netherlands	-127.33	Disqualified				DSQ
–	Ernest van Loon	Ampėre	Netherlands	-128.80	Disqualified				DSQ
–	Hernán Vigil	Naftol	Chile	-132.80	Did not finish				DNF
–	Charles-Philbert de Couët de Lorry	Moskito III	France	-133.50	Disqualified				DSQ
–	Yury Andreyev	Logovoj	Soviet Union	-135.00	Disqualified				DSQ
–	Laurence Rook	Starlight XV	Great Britain	-137.33	Disqualified				DSQ
–	Boris Lilov	Zagib	Soviet Union	-139.50	Disqualified				DSQ
–	Nicolae Mihalcea	Ghibelin	Romania	-145.20	Disqualified				DSQ
–	Jorge Cánaves	Yatay	Argentina	-150.66	Disqualified				DSQ
–	Joaquín Nogueras	Blason	Spain	-151.33	Did not finish				DNF
–	Wiel Hendrickx	Patrick	Netherlands	-153.33	Disqualified				DSQ
–	Rashko Fratev	Stalingrade	Bulgaria	-156.20	Disqualified				DSQ
–	Krastyo Gochev	Stratsine	Bulgaria	-172.80	Disqualified				DSQ
–	Pericles Cavalcanti	Destino	Brazil	-175.50	Disqualified				DSQ
–	Stoyan Rogachev	Lérine	Bulgaria	-178.50	Disqualified				DSQ
–	Thomas Gayford	Constellation	Canada	-180.50	Disqualified				DSQ
–	Petre Andreanu	Ciurlan	Romania	-182.00	Disqualified				DSQ

== Sources ==
- Organising Committee for the XV Olympiad, The (1952). The Official Report of the Organising Committee for the XV Olympiad (PDF). LA84 Foundation. pp. 516–17, 522–24. Archived from the original (PDF) on 2 November 2013.
