= Equestrian at the 1952 Summer Olympics – Team eventing =

Team eventing at the Games of the XV Olympiad
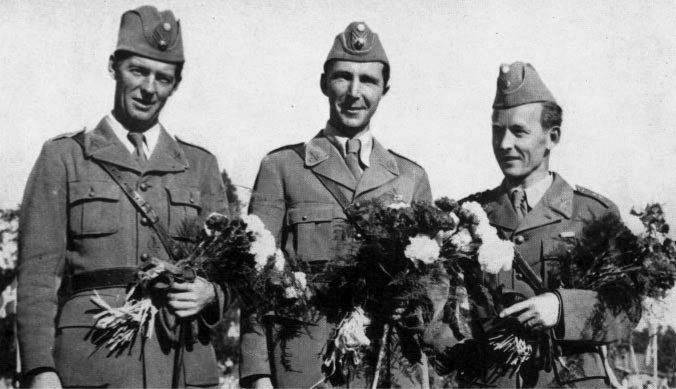
- Team Sweden
- Venue: Laakso; Ruskeasuo Equestrian Hall; Helsinki Olympic Stadium
- Date: 30 July – 2 August 1956
- Competitors: 57 from 19 nations

Medalists
| 1st place, gold medalist(s) | | Hans von Blixen-Finecke Jr. Olof Stahre; Folke Frölén | Sweden |
| 2nd place, silver medalist(s) | | Wilhelm Büsing; Klaus Wagner; Otto Rothe | Germany |
| 3rd place, bronze medalist(s) | | Charles Hough Jr. Walter Staley; John Wofford | United States |

The team eventing in equestrian at the 1952 Olympic Games in Helsinki was held from 30 July to 2 August. Only 33 of the 57 starters were able to finish the competition, with 19 being disqualified in the cross-country, 3 more retiring during that phase, and 2 being disqualified in the jumping. This left only 6 of the 19 teams with all three riders finishing.

== Competition format ==
The team and individual eventing competitions used the same scores. Eventing consisted of a dressage test, a cross-country test, and a jumping test. Team eventing final scores were the sum of the three individual scores for riders from the same nation; a team that did not have all three riders finish did not place.

- Dressage: The eventing competition featured a 12-minute dressage test. The maximum score was 400. Points could be lost for performance as well as time (0.5 points per second over the time limit). Competitors losing more than 200 points were disqualified.
- Cross-country: The cross-country test had five phases.
  - Phase A: 7 km roads. Time allowed was 29 minutes, 10 seconds (240 m/min). Time penalties were 5 points per each 5 seconds or fraction thereof over the time limit.
  - Phase B: 4 km steeplechase. Time allowed was 6 minutes, 40 seconds (600 m/min). Time penalties were 10 points per each 5 seconds or fraction thereof over the time limit. Time bonuses were 3 points per each 5 seconds or fraction thereof under the time limit (maximum 36 points gained). Obstacle faults were 20, 40, 60, or 80 points, or disqualification.
  - Phase C: 15 km roads. Time allowed was 62 minutes, 30 seconds (240 m/min). Time penalties were 5 points per each 5 seconds or fraction thereof over the time limit.
  - Phase D: 8 km cross-country. Time allowed was 17 minutes, 46 seconds (450 m/min). Time penalties were 10 points per each 5 seconds or fraction thereof over the time limit. Time bonuses were 3 points per each 5 seconds or fraction thereof under the time limit (maximum 72 points gained). Obstacle faults were 20, 40, 60, or 80 points, or disqualification. There were 34 obstacles.
  - Phase E: 2 km flat. Time allowed was 6 minutes (333 m/min). Time penalties were 5 points per each 5 seconds or fraction thereof over the time limit.
- Jumping: The jumping test had 12 obstacles and was set to a speed of 400 m/min. Time penalties were 0.25 points per second or fraction of a second over the time limit. Fault penalties were 10, 20, or points, or disqualification.

== Results ==
=== Standings after dressage ===
| Team rank | Nation | Individual results | | | Team penalties |
| Team rank | Nation | Rider | Horse | Penalties | Team penalties |
|---|---|---|---|---|---|
| 1 | Italy | Lucio Manzin | Golden Mount | -108.80 | -337.93 |
| 1 | Italy | Salvatore Oppes | Champagne | -110.33 | -337.93 |
| 1 | Italy | Piero D'Inzeo | Pagoro | -118.80 | -337.93 |
| 2 | Sweden | Olof Stahre | Komet | -108.66 | -350.19 |
| 2 | Sweden | Folke Frölén | Fair | -118.20 | -350.19 |
| 2 | Sweden | Hans von Blixen-Finecke Jr. | Jubal | -123.33 | -350.19 |
| 3 | Finland | Mauno Roiha | Laaos | -84.00 | -370.50 |
| 3 | Finland | Veikko Vartiainen | Sabina | -126.00 | -370.50 |
| 3 | Finland | Ilmari Haimi | Keija | -160.50 | -370.50 |
| 4 | France | Guy Lefrant | Verdun | -119.50 | -377.50 |
| 4 | France | André de la Simone | Baccus | -124.50 | -377.50 |
| 4 | France | Charles-Philbert de Couët de Lorry | Moskito III | -133.50 | -377.50 |
| 5 | Denmark | Aage Rubæk-Nielsen | Sahara | -119.00 | -382.86 |
| 5 | Denmark | Otto Mønsted Acthon | Sirdar | -121.66 | -382.86 |
| 5 | Denmark | Hans Christian Andersen | Tom | -142.20 | -382.86 |
| 6 | Germany | Wilhelm Büsing | Hubertus | -103.50 | -399.49 |
| 6 | Germany | Klaus Wagner | Dachs | -109.66 | -399.49 |
| 6 | Germany | Otto Rothe | Trux von Kamax | -186.33 | -399.49 |
| 7 | Argentina | Carlos Villanueva | San Luis | -124.66 | -406.12 |
| 7 | Argentina | Pedro Mercado | Mandinga | -130.80 | -406.12 |
| 7 | Argentina | Jorge Canaves | Yatay | -150.66 | -406.12 |
| 8 | Switzerland | Hans Schwarzenbach | Vae Victis | -121.66 | -408.99 |
| 8 | Switzerland | Werner Kilcher | Voilette | -126.33 | -408.99 |
| 8 | Switzerland | Jörg Ziegler | Vanna | -161.00 | -408.99 |
| 9 | Great Britain | Bertie Hill | Stella | -126.33 | -409.46 |
| 9 | Great Britain | Laurence Rook | Starlight XV | -137.33 | -409.46 |
| 9 | Great Britain | Reg Hindley | Speculation | -145.80 | -409.46 |
| 9 | Netherlands | Max van Loon | Nerantsoula | -127.33 | -409.46 |
| 9 | Netherlands | Ernest van Loon | Ampėre | -128.80 | -409.46 |
| 9 | Netherlands | Wiel Hendrickx | Patrick | -153.33 | -409.46 |
| 11 | Soviet Union | Yury Andreyev | Logovoj | -135.00 | -413.50 |
| 11 | Soviet Union | Valerian Kuybyshev | Perekop | -139.00 | -413.50 |
| 11 | Soviet Union | Boris Lilov | Zagib | -139.50 | -413.50 |
| 12 | United States | Charles Hough Jr. | Cassivellannus | -111.66 | -431.16 |
| 12 | United States | John Wofford | Benny Grimes | -146.00 | -431.16 |
| 12 | United States | Walter Staley | Craigwood Park | -173.50 | -431.16 |
| 13 | Chile | Hernán Vigil | Naftol | -132.80 | -445.26 |
| 13 | Chile | Mario Leuenberg | Micho | -148.66 | -445.26 |
| 13 | Chile | Rolando Mosqueira | Trelaros | -163.80 | -445.26 |
| 14 | Ireland | Mark Darley | Emily Little | -152.66 | -498.52 |
| 14 | Ireland | Ian Hume-Dudgeon | Hope | -162.20 | -498.52 |
| 14 | Ireland | Harry Freeman-Jackson | Cuchulain | -183.66 | -498.52 |
| 15 | Romania | Nicolae Mihalcea | Ghibelin | -145.20 | -498.86 |
| 15 | Romania | Mihai Timu | Cornet | -171.66 | -498.86 |
| 15 | Romania | Petre Andreanu | Ciurlan | -182.00 | -498.86 |
| 16 | Portugal | Fernando Cavaleiro | Caudel | -159.00 | -506.00 |
| 16 | Portugal | António de Almeida | Florentina | -173.20 | -506.00 |
| 16 | Portugal | Joaquim Silva | Faial | -173.80 | -506.00 |
| 17 | Bulgaria | Rashko Fratev | Stalingrade | -156.20 | -507.50 |
| 17 | Bulgaria | Krastyo Gochev | Stratsine | -172.80 | -507.50 |
| 17 | Bulgaria | Stoyan Rogachev | Lérine | -178.50 | -507.50 |
| 18 | Canada | Larry McGuinness | Tara | -171.33 | -523.83 |
| 18 | Canada | Henry Stewart Treviranus | Rustum | -172.00 | -523.83 |
| 18 | Canada | Thomas Gayford | Constellation | -180.50 | -523.83 |
| 19 | Spain | Joaquín Nogueras | Blason | -151.33 | -527.66 |
| 19 | Spain | Beltrán de Albuquerque | Huron | -186.00 | -527.66 |
| 19 | Spain | Fernando López | Amado Mio | -190.33 | -527.66 |

=== Standings after cross-country ===
| Team rank | Nation | Individual results | | | | | Team penalties |
| Team rank | Nation | Rider | Horse | Dressage | Cross-country | Total | Team penalties |
|---|---|---|---|---|---|---|---|
| 1 | Sweden | Hans von Blixen-Finecke Jr. | Jubal | -123.33 | 105 | -18.33 | -160.19 |
| 1 | Sweden | Olof Stahre | Komet | -108.66 | 81 | -27.66 | -160.19 |
| 1 | Sweden | Folke Frölén | Fair | -118.20 | 4 | -114.20 | -160.19 |
| 2 | Germany | Wilhelm Büsing | Hubertus | -103.50 | 48 | -55.50 | -225.49 |
| 2 | Germany | Klaus Wagner | Dachs | -109.66 | 54 | -55.66 | -225.49 |
| 2 | Germany | Otto Rothe | Trux von Kamax | -186.33 | 72 | -114.33 | -225.49 |
| 3 | United States | Charles Hough Jr. | Cassivellannus | -111.66 | 51 | -60.66 | -547.16 |
| 3 | United States | Walter Staley | Craigwood Park | -173.50 | 25 | -148.50 | -547.16 |
| 3 | United States | John Wofford | Benny Grimes | -146.00 | -192 | -338.00 | -547.16 |
| 4 | Portugal | Fernando Cavaleiro | Caudel | -159.00 | -14 | -173.00 | -608.00 |
| 4 | Portugal | António de Almeida | Florentina | -173.20 | -43 | -216.20 | -608.00 |
| 4 | Portugal | Joaquim Silva | Faial | -173.80 | -45 | -218.80 | -608.00 |
| 5 | Denmark | Hans Christian Andersen | Tom | -142.20 | -40 | -182.20 | -748.86 |
| 5 | Denmark | Otto Mønsted Acthon | Sirdar | -121.66 | -126 | -247.66 | -748.86 |
| 5 | Denmark | Aage Rubæk-Nielsen | Sahara | -119.00 | -200 | -319.00 | -748.86 |
| 6 | Ireland | Harry Freeman-Jackson | Cuchulain | -183.66 | -55 | -238.66 | -893.52 |
| 6 | Ireland | Ian Hume-Dudgeon | Hope | -162.20 | -87 | -249.20 | -893.52 |
| 6 | Ireland | Mark Darley | Emily Little | -152.66 | -253 | -405.66 | -893.52 |
| – | Great Britain | Bertie Hill | Stella | -126.33 | 69 | -57.33 | Eliminated |
| – | Great Britain | Reg Hindley | Speculation | -145.80 | 34 | -111.80 | Eliminated |
| – | Great Britain | Laurence Rook | Starlight XV | -137.33 | Disqualified | | Eliminated |
| – | France | Guy Lefrant | Verdun | -119.50 | 75 | -44.50 | Eliminated |
| – | France | André de la Simone | Baccus | -124.50 | -69 | -193.50 | Eliminated |
| – | France | Charles-Philbert de Couët de Lorry | Moskito III | -133.50 | Disqualified | | Eliminated |
| – | Switzerland | Jörg Ziegler | Vanna | -161.00 | 34 | -127.00 | Eliminated |
| – | Switzerland | Hans Schwarzenbach | Vae Victis | -121.66 | -24 | -145.66 | Eliminated |
| – | Switzerland | Werner Kilcher | Voilette | -126.33 | Disqualified | | Eliminated |
| – | Canada | Henry Stewart Treviranus | Rustum | -172.00 | -27 | -199.00 | Eliminated |
| – | Canada | Larry McGuinness | Tara | -171.33 | -154 | -325.33 | Eliminated |
| – | Canada | Thomas Gayford | Constellation | -180.50 | Disqualified | | Eliminated |
| – | Spain | Beltrán de Albuquerque | Huron | -186.00 | 78 | -108.00 | Eliminated |
| – | Spain | Fernando López | Amado Mio | -190.33 | -268 | -458.33 | Eliminated |
| – | Spain | Joaquín Nogueras | Blason | -151.33 | Did not finish | | Eliminated |
| – | Chile | Mario Leuenberg | Micho | -148.66 | 37 | -111.66 | Eliminated |
| – | Chile | Rolando Mosqueira | Trelaros | -163.80 | -305 | -468.80 | Eliminated |
| – | Chile | Hernán Vigil | Naftol | -132.80 | Did not finish | | Eliminated |
| – | Argentina | Pedro Mercado | Mandinga | -130.80 | 78 | -52.80 | Eliminated |
| – | Argentina | Carlos Villanueva | San Luis | -124.66 | Did not finish | | Eliminated |
| – | Argentina | Jorge Canaves | Yatay | -150.66 | Disqualified | | Eliminated |
| – | Soviet Union | Valerian Kuybyshev | Perekop | -139.00 | 75 | -64.00 | Eliminated |
| – | Soviet Union | Yury Andreyev | Logovoj | -135.00 | Disqualified | | Eliminated |
| – | Soviet Union | Boris Lilov | Zagib | -139.50 | Disqualified | | Eliminated |
| – | Italy | Piero D'Inzeo | Pagoro | -118.80 | 52 | -66.80 | Eliminated |
| – | Italy | Lucio Manzin | Golden Mount | -108.80 | Disqualified | | Eliminated |
| – | Italy | Salvatore Oppes | Champagne | -110.33 | Disqualified | | Eliminated |
| – | Romania | Mihai Timu | Cornet | -171.66 | -189 | -360.66 | Eliminated |
| – | Romania | Nicolae Mihalcea | Ghibelin | -145.20 | Disqualified | | Eliminated |
| – | Romania | Petre Andreanu | Ciurlan | -182.00 | Disqualified | | Eliminated |
| – | Finland | Ilmari Haimi | Keija | -160.50 | -207 | -367.50 | Eliminated |
| – | Finland | Mauno Roiha | Laaos | -84.00 | Disqualified | | Eliminated |
| – | Finland | Veikko Vartiainen | Sabina | -126.00 | Disqualified | | Eliminated |
| – | Netherlands | Max van Loon | Nerantsoula | -127.33 | Disqualified | | Eliminated |
| – | Netherlands | Ernest van Loon | Ampėre | -128.80 | Disqualified | | Eliminated |
| – | Netherlands | Wiel Hendrickx | Patrick | -153.33 | Disqualified | | Eliminated |
| – | Bulgaria | Rashko Fratev | Stalingrade | -156.20 | Disqualified | | Eliminated |
| – | Bulgaria | Krastyo Gochev | Stratsine | -172.80 | Disqualified | | Eliminated |
| – | Bulgaria | Stoyan Rogachev | Lérine | -178.50 | Disqualified | | Eliminated |

=== Final standings after jumping ===
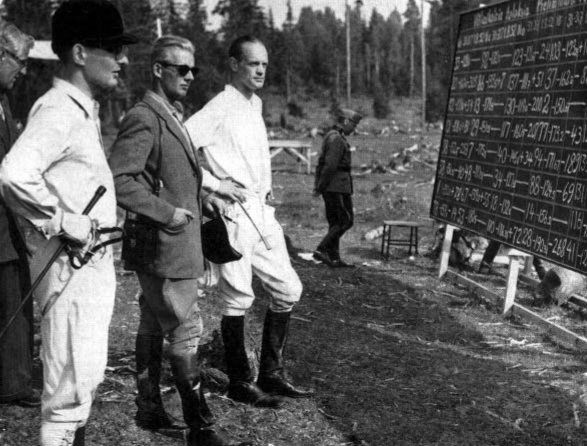
Team Germany

| Team rank | Nation | Individual results | | | | | | Team penalties |
| Team rank | Nation | Rider | Horse | Dressage | Cross-country | Jumping | Total | Team penalties |
|---|---|---|---|---|---|---|---|---|
| 1st place, gold medalist(s) | Sweden | Hans von Blixen-Finecke Jr. | Jubal | -123.33 | 105 | -10 | -28.33 | -221.94 |
| 1st place, gold medalist(s) | Sweden | Olof Stahre | Komet | -108.66 | 81 | -41.75 | -69.41 | -221.94 |
| 1st place, gold medalist(s) | Sweden | Folke Frölén | Fair | -118.20 | 4 | -10 | -124.20 | -221.94 |
| 2nd place, silver medalist(s) | Germany | Wilhelm Büsing | Hubertus | -103.50 | 48 | 0 | -55.50 | -235.49 |
| 2nd place, silver medalist(s) | Germany | Klaus Wagner | Dachs | -109.66 | 54 | -10 | -65.66 | -235.49 |
| 2nd place, silver medalist(s) | Germany | Otto Rothe | Trux von Kamax | -186.33 | 72 | 0 | -114.33 | -235.49 |
| 3rd place, bronze medalist(s) | United States | Charles Hough Jr. | Cassivellannus | -111.66 | 51 | -10 | -70.66 | -587.16 |
| 3rd place, bronze medalist(s) | United States | Walter Staley | Craigwood Park | -173.50 | 25 | -20 | -168.50 | -587.16 |
| 3rd place, bronze medalist(s) | United States | John Wofford | Benny Grimes | -146.00 | -192 | -10 | -348.00 | -587.16 |
| 4 | Portugal | Fernando Cavaleiro | Caudel | -159.00 | -14 | -10 | -183.00 | -618.00 |
| 4 | Portugal | António de Almeida | Florentina | -173.20 | -43 | 0 | -216.20 | -618.00 |
| 4 | Portugal | Joaquim Silva | Faial | -173.80 | -45 | 0 | -218.80 | -618.00 |
| 5 | Denmark | Hans Christian Andersen | Tom | -142.20 | -40 | -40 | -222.20 | -828.86 |
| 5 | Denmark | Otto Mønsted Acthon | Sirdar | -121.66 | -126 | -20 | -267.66 | -828.86 |
| 5 | Denmark | Aage Rubæk-Nielsen | Sahara | -119.00 | -200 | -20 | -339.00 | -828.86 |
| 6 | Ireland | Harry Freeman-Jackson | Cuchulain | -183.66 | -55 | -30 | -268.66 | -953.52 |
| 6 | Ireland | Ian Hume-Dudgeon | Hope | -162.20 | -87 | -20 | -269.20 | -953.52 |
| 6 | Ireland | Mark Darley | Emily Little | -152.66 | -253 | -10 | -415.66 | -953.52 |
| – | Great Britain | Bertie Hill | Stella | -126.33 | 69 | -10 | -67.33 | Eliminated |
| – | Great Britain | Reg Hindley | Speculation | -145.80 | 34 | -10 | -121.80 | Eliminated |
| – | Great Britain | Laurence Rook | Starlight XV | -137.33 | Disqualified | | | Eliminated |
| – | France | Guy Lefrant | Verdun | -119.50 | 75 | -10 | -54.50 | Eliminated |
| – | France | André de la Simone | Baccus | -124.50 | -69 | 0 | -193.50 | Eliminated |
| – | France | Charles-Philbert de Couët de Lorry | Moskito III | -133.50 | Disqualified | | | Eliminated |
| – | Switzerland | Jörg Ziegler | Vanna | -161.00 | 34 | -20 | -147.00 | Eliminated |
| – | Switzerland | Hans Schwarzenbach | Vae Victis | -121.66 | -24 | -10 | -155.66 | Eliminated |
| – | Switzerland | Werner Kilcher | Voilette | -126.33 | Disqualified | | | Eliminated |
| – | Canada | Henry Stewart Treviranus | Rustum | -172.00 | -27 | 0 | -199.00 | Eliminated |
| – | Canada | Larry McGuinness | Tara | -171.33 | -154 | 0 | -325.33 | Eliminated |
| – | Canada | Thomas Gayford | Constellation | -180.50 | Disqualified | | | Eliminated |
| – | Spain | Beltrán de Albuquerque | Huron | -186.00 | 78 | -10 | -118.00 | Eliminated |
| – | Spain | Fernando López | Amado Mio | -190.33 | -268 | -20 | -468.33 | Eliminated |
| – | Spain | Joaquín Nogueras | Blason | -151.33 | Did not finish | | | Eliminated |
| – | Argentina | Pedro Mercado | Mandinga | -130.80 | 78 | -10 | -62.80 | Eliminated |
| – | Argentina | Carlos Villanueva | San Luis | -124.66 | Did not finish | | | Eliminated |
| – | Argentina | Jorge Canaves | Yatay | -150.66 | Disqualified | | | Eliminated |
| – | Italy | Piero D'Inzeo | Pagoro | -118.80 | 52 | 0 | -66.80 | Eliminated |
| – | Italy | Lucio Manzin | Golden Mount | -108.80 | Disqualified | | | Eliminated |
| – | Italy | Salvatore Oppes | Champagne | -110.33 | Disqualified | | | Eliminated |
| – | Soviet Union | Valerian Kuybyshev | Perekop | -139.00 | 75 | -20 | -84.00 | Eliminated |
| – | Soviet Union | Yury Andreyev | Logovoj | -135.00 | Disqualified | | | Eliminated |
| – | Soviet Union | Boris Lilov | Zagib | -139.50 | Disqualified | | | Eliminated |
| – | Chile | Mario Leuenberg | Micho | -148.66 | 37 | -12.50 | -124.16 | Eliminated |
| – | Chile | Rolando Mosqueira | Trelaros | -163.80 | -305 | Disqualified | | Eliminated |
| – | Chile | Hernán Vigil | Naftol | -132.80 | Did not finish | | | Eliminated |
| – | Finland | Ilmari Haimi | Keija | -160.50 | -207 | -40 | -407.50 | Eliminated |
| – | Finland | Mauno Roiha | Laaos | -84.00 | Disqualified | | | Eliminated |
| – | Finland | Veikko Vartiainen | Sabina | -126.00 | Disqualified | | | Eliminated |
| – | Romania | Mihai Timu | Cornet | -171.66 | -189 | Disqualified | | Eliminated |
| – | Romania | Nicolae Mihalcea | Ghibelin | -145.20 | Disqualified | | | Eliminated |
| – | Romania | Petre Andreanu | Ciurlan | -182.00 | Disqualified | | | Eliminated |
| – | Netherlands | Max van Loon | Nerantsoula | -127.33 | Disqualified | | | Eliminated |
| – | Netherlands | Ernest van Loon | Ampėre | -128.80 | Disqualified | | | Eliminated |
| – | Netherlands | Wiel Hendrickx | Patrick | -153.33 | Disqualified | | | Eliminated |
| – | Bulgaria | Rashko Fratev | Stalingrade | -156.20 | Disqualified | | | Eliminated |
| – | Bulgaria | Krastyo Gochev | Stratsine | -172.80 | Disqualified | | | Eliminated |
| – | Bulgaria | Stoyan Rogachev | Lérine | -178.50 | Disqualified | | | Eliminated |

== Sources ==
- Organising Committee for the XV Olympiad, The (1952). "The Official Report of the Organising Committee for the XV Olympiad" (PDF). LA84 Foundation. pp. 516–17, 522–24, 527. Archived from the original (PDF) on 2 November 2013.
