= Equestrian at the 1956 Summer Olympics – Individual dressage =

Equestrian at the Olympics

Individual dressage at the Games of the XVI Olympiad
- Venue: Stockholm Olympic Stadium
- Date: 15–16 June 1956
- Competitors: 36 from 17 nations

Medalists
1st place, gold medalist(s)		Henri Saint Cyr	Sweden
2nd place, silver medalist(s)		Lis Hartel	Denmark
3rd place, bronze medalist(s)		Liselott Linsenhoff	United Team of Germany

The individual dressage at the 1956 Summer Olympics took place between 15 and 16 June, at the Stockholm Olympic Stadium. The event was open to men and women. The team and individual dressage competitions used the same results. Five judges gave scores, with the result being the sum of the scores.

== Results ==
36 riders competed.

Rank	Rider	Nation	Horse	Score
1st place, gold medalist(s)	Henri Saint Cyr	Sweden	Juli	860.0
2nd place, silver medalist(s)	Lis Hartel	Denmark	Jubilee	850.0
3rd place, bronze medalist(s)	Liselott Linsenhoff	United Team of Germany	Adular	832.0
4	Gehnäll Persson	Sweden	Knaust	821.0
5	André Jousseaume	France	Harpagon	814.0
6	Gottfried Trachsel	Switzerland	Kursus	807.0
7	Gustaf Adolf Boltenstern Jr.	Sweden	Krest	794.0
8	Henri Chammartin	Switzerland	Woehler	789.0
9	Hannelore Weygand	United Team of Germany	Perkunos	785.0
10	Gustav Fischer	Switzerland	Vasello	750.0
11	Sergei Filatov	Soviet Union	Ingas	744.0
12	António de Almeida	Portugal	Feitiço	743.0
13	Else Christophersen	Norway	Diva	739.0
14	Anneliese Küppers	United Team of Germany	Afrika	729.0
15	Aleksandr Vtorov	Soviet Union	Repertoir	726.0
16	Gheorghe Teodorescu	Romania	Palatin	721.0
17	Bob Borg	United States	Bill Biddle	720.0
18	Nikolay Sitko	Soviet Union	Skatchek	700.0
19	Hermann Zobel	Denmark	Monty	673.0
20	Leonard Lafond	Canada	Rath Patrick	657.0
21	Lorna Johnstone	Great Britain	Rosie Dream	655.0
22	Jean-Albert Brasu	France	Vol d'Amour	648.0
23	Inger Lemvigh-Müller	Denmark	Bel Ami	644.0
24	Nicolae Mihalcea	Romania	Mihnea	625.0
25	Lilian Williams	Great Britain	Pilgrim	616.0
25	Robert Lattermann	Austria	Danubia	616.0
27	Ann-Lise Kielland	Norway	Clary	601.5
28	Alexis Pantchoulidzew	Netherlands	Lascar	586.5
29	Bodil Russ	Norway	Corona	572.0
30	Elaine Watt	United States	Connecticut Yankee	568.0
31	Mauno Roiha	Finland	Laaos	562.0
32	Jean Salmon	France	Kipling	554.0
33	Nicolae Marcoci	Romania	Corvin	516.0
34	Alexander Sagadin	Austria	Cyprius	513.0
35	Jorge Cavoti	Argentina	Carnavalito	483.5
36	Krum Lekarski	Bulgaria	Edgard	396.5
