= Equestrian at the 1956 Summer Olympics – Team dressage =

Equestrian at the Olympics

Team dressage at the Games of the XVI Olympiad
- Venue: Stockholm Olympic Stadium
- Date: 15–16 June 1956
- Competitors: 24 (8 teams) from 8 nations

Medalists
1st place, gold medalist(s)		Gustaf Adolf Boltenstern Jr.; Gehnäll Persson; Henri Saint Cyr	Sweden
2nd place, silver medalist(s)		Anneliese Küppers; Liselott Linsenhoff; Hannelore Weygand	United Team of Germany
3rd place, bronze medalist(s)		Henri Chammartin; Gustav Fischer; Gottfried Trachsel	Switzerland

The team dressage at the 1956 Summer Olympics took place between 15 and 16 June, at the Stockholm Olympic Stadium. The event was open to men and women. The team and individual dressage competitions used the same results. Five judges gave scores, with the result being the sum of the scores. The three individual scores were summed to give a team score.

== Results ==
8 teams of 3 riders competed.

Rank	Nation	Riders	Horses	Individual Scores	Team Score
1st place, gold medalist(s)	Sweden	Henri Saint Cyr; Gehnäll Persson; Gustaf Adolf Boltenstern Jr.	Juli; Knaust; Krest	860.0; 821.0; 794.0	2475.0
2nd place, silver medalist(s)	United Team of Germany	Liselott Linsenhoff; Hannelore Weygand; Anneliese Küppers	Adular; Perkunos; Afrika	832.0; 785.0; 729.0	2346.0
3rd place, bronze medalist(s)	Switzerland	Gottfried Trachsel; Henri Chammartin; Gustav Fischer	Kursus; Woehler; Vasello	807.0; 789.0; 750.0	2346.0
4	Soviet Union	Sergei Filatov; Aleksandr Vtorov; Nikolay Sitko	Ingas; Repertoir; Skatchek	744.0; 726.0; 700.0	2170.0
5	Denmark	Lis Hartel; Hermann Zobel; Inger Lemvigh-Müller	Jubilee; Monty; Bel Ami	850.0; 673.0; 644.0	2167.0
6	France	André Jousseaume; Jean-Albert Brasu; Jean Salmon	Harpagon; Vol d'Amour; Kipling	814.0; 648.0; 554.0	2016.0
7	Norway	Else Christophersen; Ann-Lise Kielland; Bodil Russ	Diva; Clary; Corona	739.0; 601.5; 572.0	1912.5
8	Romania	Gheorghe Teodorescu; Nicolae Mihalcea; Nicolae Marcoci	Palatin; Mihnea; Corvin	721.0; 625.0; 516.0	1862.0
