= Treviranus =

Treviranus is a surname. Notable people with the surname include:

- Gottfried Reinhold Treviranus (1776–1837), German naturalist
- Gottfried Reinhold Treviranus (politician) (1891–1971), German politician
- Henry Stewart Treviranus, Canadian equestrian
- Jutta Treviranus, Canadian academic
- Ludolph Christian Treviranus (1779–1864), German botanist, younger brother of Gottfried Reinhold Treviranus
- Ofisa Treviranus, Samoan rugby union player
- Ray Ofisa Treviranus, Samoan rugby union player
