= Becerril (surname) =

Becerril is a Spanish surname. Notable people with the surname include:

- Mario Becerril (1917–2018), Mexican equestrian
- Porfirio Becerril (born 1955), Mexican diver
- Soledad Becerril (born 1944), Spanish politician
