= Norway at the 1956 Summer Olympics =

- IOC code: NOR
- NOC: Norwegian Sports Federation

in Melbourne, Australia/Stockholm, Sweden 22 November – 8 December
- Competitors: 22 (19 men, 3 women) in 6 sports
- Flag bearers: Thor Thorvaldsen (Melbourne); Birck Elgaaen (Stockholm)
- Medals Ranked 22nd: Gold 1 Silver 0 Bronze 2 Total 3

Summer Olympics appearances (overview)
- 1900; ~~1904~~; 1908; 1912; 1920; 1924; 1928; 1932; 1936; 1948; 1952; 1956; 1960; 1964; 1968; 1972; 1976; 1980; 1984; 1988; 1992; 1996; 2000; 2004; 2008; 2012; 2016; 2020; 2024; 2028

Other related appearances
- 1906 Intercalated Games

Norway competed at the 1956 Summer Olympics in Melbourne, Australia and Stockholm, Sweden (equestrian events). 22 competitors, 19 men and 3 women, took part in 18 events in 6 sports.

== Equestrian ==
Individual dressage

- Else Christophersen
- Anne-Lise Kielland
- Bodil Russ

Team dressage

- Else Christophersen
- Anne-Lise Kielland
- Bodil Russ

Individual jumping

- Birck Elgaaen

== Shooting ==
Five shooters represented Norway in 1956.

50 m rifle, three positions

- Erling Kongshaug
- Anker Hagen

50 m rifle, prone

- Erling Kongshaug
- Anker Hagen

100m running deer

- Rolf Bergersen
- John Larsen

Trap

- Hans Aasnæs
