= Anton Ebben =

Dutch equestrian

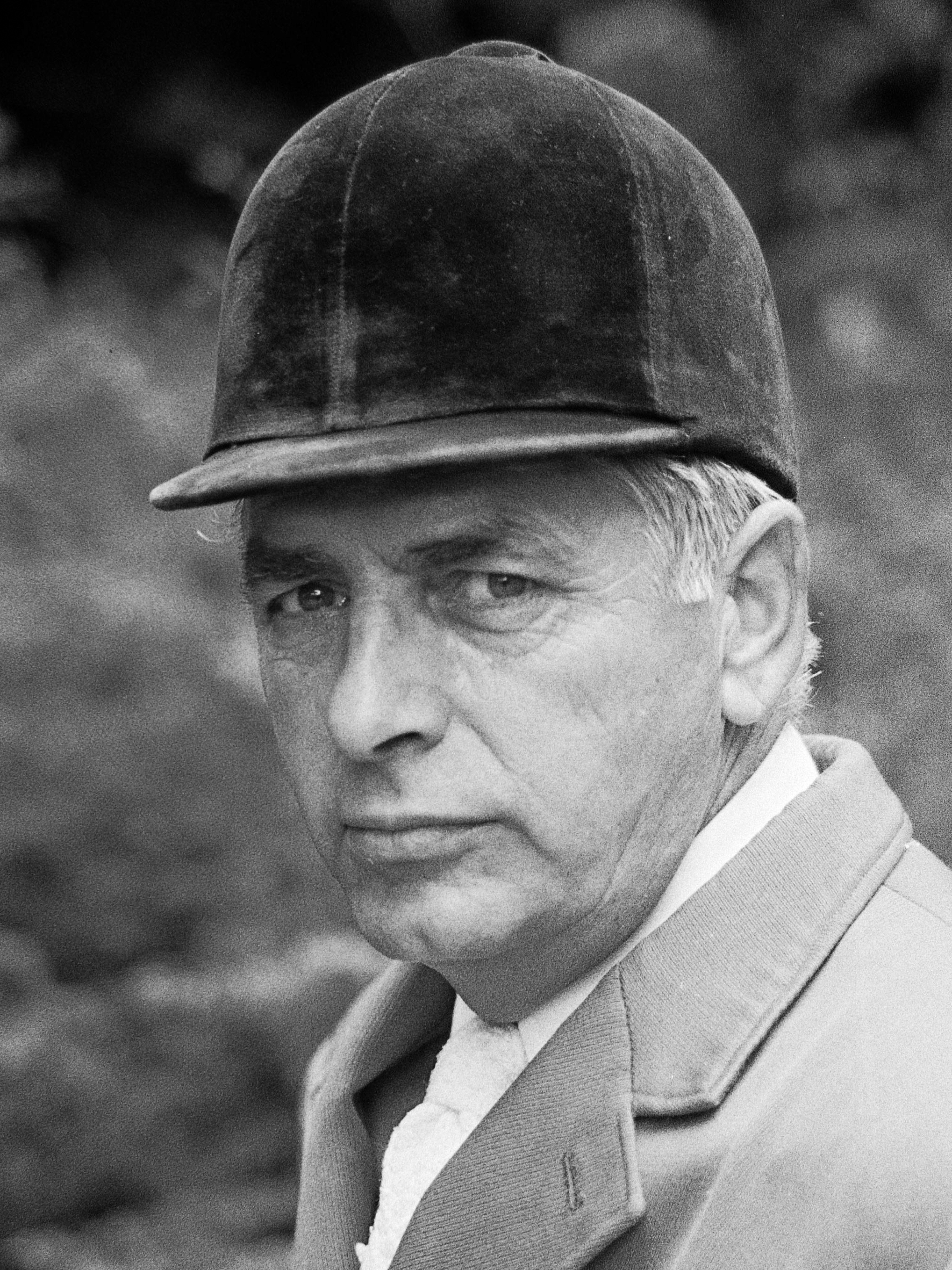
- Anton Ebben in 1980

Personal information
- Born: 22 December 1930 Tilburg, the Netherlands
- Died: 4 February 2011 (aged 80) 's-Graveland, the Netherlands
- Height: 1.67 m (5 ft 6 in)
- Weight: 78 kg (172 lb)

Sport
- Sport: Horse riding
Medal record
Representing the Netherlands
Show Jumping World Championships
Silver medal – second place	1978 Aachen	Team
European Show Jumping Championships
Gold medal – first place	1977 Vienna	Team
Bronze medal – third place	1977 Vienna	Individual

Antonius "Toon" Ebben (22 December 1930 – 4 February 2011) was a Dutch equestrian. After acting as a groom for Max and Ernest van Loon at the 1952 Summer Olympics, Ebben began competing himself, riding Kairouan in the 1950s–60s and later Jumbo Design (born 1969). At the 1976 Summer Olympics he finished 25th and 12th in the individual and team mixed jumping events, respectively. The following year he won a bronze and a gold European medal in these events. In 1978 Ebeen earned a silver medal in the team jumping, on Jumbo Design, and was named a Knight of the Order of Orange-Nassau.

Ebben retired in 1986. He died in 2011 after a long illness. Since 2012, a jumping competition known as the Anton Ebben Memorial has been held in Amsterdam.
