= Lilov =

Lilov (Bulgarian: Лилов) is a Bulgarian masculine surname, its feminine counterpart is Lilova. Notable people with the surname include:

- Aleksandar Lilov (1933–2013), Bulgarian politician and philosopher
- Boris Lilov, Soviet equestrian
- Ivan Lilov (born 1988), Bulgarian basketball player
