= Joaquim Silva =

Joaquim Silva may refer to:

- Joaquim Silva (cyclist) (born 1992), Portuguese cyclist
- Joaquim Silva (equestrian) (1924-2007), Portuguese equestrian
- Joaquim Silva (fighter) (born 1989), Brazilian mixed martial artist
- Joaquim Silva (runner) (born 1961), Portuguese long-distance runner
- Joaquim Alberto Silva (1974–2019), Angolan footballer
- Joaquim Fernandes Silva (1926–2009), Portuguese footballer
