= Antonio de Almeida =

Antonio de Almeida is the name of:

- Antonio de Almeida (conductor) (1928–1997), French conductor
- António José de Almeida (1866–1929), sixth president of Portugal
- Antônio de Almeida Lustosa (1886-1974), Brazilian Roman Catholic prelate
- António de Almeida (athlete) (1901-1957), Portuguese Olympic athlete
- António de Almeida (equestrian) (1915-1994), Portuguese Olympic equestrian
- Antonio de Almeida e Costa (1932–2010), Portuguese naval officer and politician
- António de Almeida Santos (1926–2016), Portuguese politician
- António de Almeida-Ribeiro (born 1955), Portuguese diplomat
