= Mosqueira =

Mosqueira is a rare variant of the more popular Mosquera. Notable people with the surname include:

- Gabriela Mosqueira (born 1990), Paraguayan rower
- Ismael Mosqueira (1911–1966), Mexican gymnast
- Josh Mosqueira, Canadian-Mexican game designer
- Rolando Mosqueira (1920-?), Chilean equestrian
- Silvano Mosqueira (1875–1954), Paraguayan writer
