= Carlos Villanueva =

Carlos Villanueva may refer to:

- Carlos Villanueva (baseball) (born 1983), Major League Baseball relief pitcher
- Carlos Villanueva (equestrian) (1918–2011), Argentine Olympic equestrian
- Carlos Villanueva (Chilean footballer) (born 1986), Chilean football attacking midfielder
- Carlos Villanueva (Mexican footballer) (born 1994), Mexican football defender
- Carlos Raúl Villanueva (1900–1975), Venezuelan architect
