= Wilhelm Büsing =

German equestrian (1921–2023)

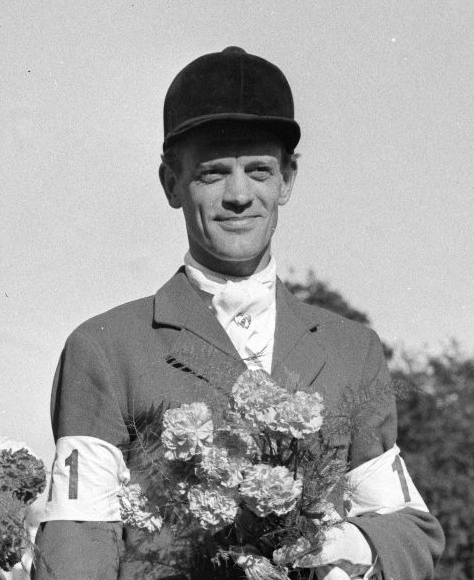
- Büsing at the 1952 Olympics in Helsinki

Personal information
- Born: 2 March 1921; Jade, Germany
- Died: 25 June 2023 (aged 102); Jade, Germany
Medal record
Equestrian
Representing Germany
Olympic Games
Silver medal – second place	1952 Helsinki	Team eventing
Bronze medal – third place	1952 Helsinki	Individual eventing
European Championships
Silver medal – second place	1954 Basel	Team eventing

Wilhelm Büsing (2 March 1921 – 25 June 2023) was a German equestrian who competed at the 1952 Summer Olympics in Helsinki, where he won a silver medal in team eventing and a bronze medal in the individual event. He also won a silver medal in team eventing at the 1954 European Championships. A veterinarian by trade, he was also present at the 1956, 1960, and 1964 Summer Olympics as a coach and trainer. In addition to his veterinary practice, he also worked as horse breeder.

== Biography ==
Büsing was born on 2 March 1921 in Jade, Germany. He was the son of a successful horse dealer and rider and became experienced in handling horses at a young age. He began to participate in equestrian competitions, and by 1937 made his first appearance in an international event. He became one of his country's most successful riders and was later selected to compete at the 1952 Summer Olympics in Helsinki, Finland. He was one of the first Germans selected to the Olympics after the Nazi rule and was chosen by the West German Olympic Committee for Equestrianism to ride the gelding Hanoverian horse Hubertus.

Büsing won the bronze medal at the individual event with −55.50 points, behind Guy Lefrant (−54.50) and Hans von Blixen-Finecke Jr. (−28.33). He also competed with the West German team (Klaus Wagner, Otto Rothe) in the team eventing and helped them win the silver medal with −235.49 points, only behind the Swedish team that had −221.94; the United States placed third with −587.16.

When Büsing returned to West Germany, there was a large celebration held for his accomplishments. He later recalled, "All hell broke loose in Oldenburg. The children had no school. There was a huge crowd." He was driven to his hometown, Jade, in a four-horse carriage and people lined the streets to celebrate his accomplishments. Two years later, Büsing was part of the German team that won the silver medal at the European Eventing Championships. He retired from equestrian competition shortly after.

In 1945, Büsing received his doctorate with a thesis concerning Oldenburg horse breeding. He also became a veterinarian and worked as a horse breeder. After his retirement from competition, he served as a referee at international tournaments and as the veterinarian, chef de mission and coach of the German equestrian teams at the 1956, 1960, and 1964 Summer Olympics, as well as at the 1966 European Championships.

Büsing married his wife, Dorle, 18 years his junior, in 1959, and had two children with her. He was awarded a gold medal by the Weser-Ems Chamber of Agriculture in 2000 and was given the Golden Badge of Honor by the Association of Oldenburg Breeders on his 90th birthday in 2011. He turned 100 in 2021, and died in Jade on 25 June 2023, at age 102. At the time of his death, he was one of the oldest living Olympians, the longest-lived German Olympic medalist, and the oldest surviving male medalist from the 1952 Olympics.
