= Vtorov =

Vtorov (masculine, Russian: Второв) or Vtorova (feminine, Russian: Второва) is a Russian surname. It is derived from the sobriquet второй (vtoroy, meaning "Second") and may refer to:

- Aleksandr Vtorov (1916-?) Soviet equestrian
- Nikolay Vtorov (1866–1918), Russian industrialist
- Pyotr Vtorov (1938-1979), Soviet scientist
