= Alexander Sagadin =

Austrian equestrian (1915–1985)

Personal information
- Full name: Alexander Konrad Anton Sagadin
- Nationality: Austrian
- Born: 12 June 1915; Graz, Austria-Hungary
- Died: 20 September 1985 (aged 70); Hofheim am Taunus, West Germany

Sport
- Sport: Equestrian

Alexander Sagadin (12 June 1915 – 20 September 1985) was an Austrian equestrian. He competed in the individual dressage event at the 1956 Summer Olympics.
