= Mosquera =

Mosquera is a surname of Galician origin, later spreading to other parts of Spain such as Castile and Extremadura or Latin America. The family crest states (Spanish) Gallego. It derives from the mansion of the family's founder, Ramiro de Mosquera. In the fifth century, it was already linked to Moscoso, one of Galicia's oldest notable families. In Galicia, one of the oldest houses was in Coto de Villar de Payo Muniz, a dos leguas from Ourense. Another existed at villa de Vilariño de Conso.

== Etymology ==
According to etymologists, the name Mosquera is an allusion to a place where the greatest quantity of "aces" grows, and derives itself from the word "moscon", which originally referred to a type of tree.

== Family ==
Part of the family settled in Portugal where the name changed to "Mosqueira". The following names are in the lists of the Order of Carlos III: Gabriel Mosquera and Luis Mosquera y Julián Mosquera.

Antonio Mosquera was born in Spain and was a soldier in the War of Flanders and governor of Puerto Rico. He went to Chile with a thousand men, and arrived at Santiago on October 6, 1605.

== Geographical distribution ==
As of 2014, 68.6% of all known bearers of the surname Mosquera were residents of Colombia (frequency 1:264), 8.7% of Ecuador (1:689), 7.0% of Venezuela (1:1,635), 4.5% of Spain (1:3,950), 2.7% of the Philippines (1:14,325), 1.9% of Peru (1:6,421), 1.8% of Panama (1:820), 1.4% of Argentina (1:11,512) and 1.2% of the United States (1:111,635).

In Spain, the frequency of the surname was higher than national average (1:3,950) only in one autonomous community: Galicia (1:409).

In Colombia, the frequency of the surname was higher than national average (1:264) in the following departments:

1. Chocó Department (1:10)
2. Cauca Department (1:83)
3. Valle del Cauca Department (1:101)
4. Guaviare Department (1:169)
5. Huila Department (1:234)
6. Risaralda Department (1:257)

== People with the surname Mosquera ==
- Alfredo Mosquera (1924–2001), Peruvian footballer
- Aquivaldo Mosquera (born 1981), Colombian football player
- Aurelio Mosquera (1883–1939), Ecuadorian president
- Edwin Mosquera (weightlifter) (born 1985), Colombian weightlifter
- Ezequiel Mosquera (born 1975), Spanish professional cyclist
- Jesús Mosquera (born 1993), Spanish actor
- Joaquín Mosquera (1787–1878), Colombian president
- John Jairo Mosquera (born 1988), Colombian football player
- Josimar Mosquera (born 1982), Colombian football player
- José Mosquera, Colombian baseball player and manager
- Luis Antonio Valencia Mosquera (born 1985), Ecuadorian football player
- Luis Javier Mosquera (born 1995), Colombian weightlifter
- Mabel Mosquera (born 1969), Colombian weightlifter
- María Roësset Mosquera (1882–1921) Portuguese-born Spanish painter
- Máximo Mosquera (1928–2016), Peruvian footballer
- Nemesio Mosquera (1936–2019), Peruvian footballer
- Óscar Albeiro Figueroa Mosquera (born 1983), Colombian weightlifter, Olympic champion
- Pedro Mosquera (born 1988), Spanish footballer
- Roberto Mosquera (born 1956), Peruvian footballer and manager
- Tomás Cipriano de Mosquera (1798–1878), Colombian president
- Yohn Geiller Mosquera (born 1989), Colombian football player

== Toponyms ==
- Mosquera, Cundinamarca, municipality in Colombia
- Mosquera, Nariño, municipality in Colombia

== See also ==
- Mosqueira, a rarer variant
