= Robert Lattermann =

Austrian equestrian

Personal information
- Nationality: Austrian
- Born: 25 November 1930
- Died: 13 May 1995 (aged 64)

Sport
- Sport: Equestrian

Robert Lattermann (25 November 1930 – 13 May 1995) was an Austrian equestrian. He competed in the individual dressage event at the 1956 Summer Olympics.
