= Elaine Watt =

American equestrian

Personal information
- Full name: Elaine Shirley Watt
- Born: December 1, 1929 Brooklyn, New York, United States
- Died: February 19, 1985 (aged 55) Penobscot, Maine, United States

Sport
- Sport: Equestrian

Elaine Shirley Watt (December 1, 1929 – February 19, 1985) was an American equestrienne. As an equestrienne, she won the Dover Saddlery/USEF Hunter Seat Medal Finals in 1947. Later on, she competed in the individual dressage event at the 1956 Summer Olympics for the United States, placing 30th.

== Biography ==
Elaine Shirley Watt was born on December 1, 1929, in Brooklyn, New York, United States. As an equestrienne, she won the Dover Saddlery/USEF Hunter Seat Medal Finals at the Pennsylvania National Horse Show in 1947. She later married horse trainer and equestrian Victor Hugo-Vidal, adopting her married name of Elaine Shirley Watt-Hugo-Vidal.

For the equestrian events at the 1956 Summer Olympics held in Stockholm, Sweden, due to Australian quarantine regulations, she was selected to be part of the United States' team. She competed in the individual dressage event which was open to anyone regardless of gender. From June 15 to 16, 1956, she rode Connecticut Yankee, also trained by Victor, and garnered 568 points. She placed 30th out of the 36 competitors that participated in the event, failing to earn a medal. Together with Victor, they had two sons named Christopher and Alexander, and often spent time in Deer Isle, Maine. In 1958, she qualified for the United States Equestrian Team's open championship after winning three events at the Sunnyfield Farm horse show.

After Watt and Hugo-Vidal divorced, she used her birth name. She permanently moved to her family's summer home with her two sons, and her new partner, Joanie Gibson. Watt later died on February 19, 1985, in Penobscot, Maine, at the age of 55.
