= Leonard Lafond =

Canadian equestrian

Personal information
- Full name: Leonard Rudolphe Lafond
- Born: 20 August 1901; Compton, Quebec, Canada
- Died: 17 December 1959 (aged 58); Santa Barbara, California, United States

Sport
- Sport: Equestrian

Leonard Rudolphe Lafond (20 August 1901 – 17 December 1959) was a Canadian equestrian. He competed in the individual dressage event at the 1956 Summer Olympics.
