= Mihai Timu =

Romanian equestrian

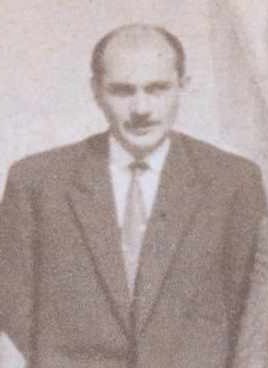
- Timu in 1965

Personal information
- Nationality: Romanian
- Born: 9 May 1922 Piatra Neamt, Romania
- Died: 5 August 1968 (aged 46)

Sport
- Sport: Equestrian

Mihai Timu (9 May 1922 – 5 August 1968) was a Romanian equestrian. He competed in two events at the 1952 Summer Olympics.

He was killed in a motor vehicle accident, alongside fellow Romanian equestrian Gheorghe Langa.
