= Birck Elgaaen =

Norwegian equestrian

Birck Elgaaen (2 August 1917 – 7 January 2013) was a Norwegian equestrian who competed in the individual show jumping event at the 1956 Summer Olympics in Stockholm. A member of the Oslo Rideklubb, he was unable to complete the competition. He was born in Oslo, Norway and later became a horse riding instructor.
