= Yury Andreyev =

Soviet equestrian (born 1930)

Personal information
- Nationality: Soviet
- Born: 1930

Sport
- Sport: Equestrian

Yury Vasilievich Andreyev (Russian: Юрий Васильевич Андреев; born 1930) is a Soviet equestrian. He competed in two events at the 1952 Summer Olympics.
