= Stoyan Rogachev =

Bulgarian equestrian

Personal information
- Full name: Stoyan Todorov Rogachev
- Nationality: Bulgarian
- Born: 4 September 1924

Sport
- Sport: Equestrian

Stoyan Rogachev (Bulgarian: Стоян Рогачев; born 4 September 1924) was a Bulgarian equestrian. He competed in two events at the 1952 Summer Olympics.
