= Lilian Williams =

British equestrian

Personal information
- Nationality: British
- Born: 9 June 1895 Trysull, England
- Died: 16 August 1969 (aged 74)

Sport
- Sport: Equestrian

Lilian Williams (9 June 1895 – 16 August 1969) was a British equestrian. She competed at the 1956 Summer Olympics and the 1960 Summer Olympics.
