= Hernán Vigil =

Chilean equestrian

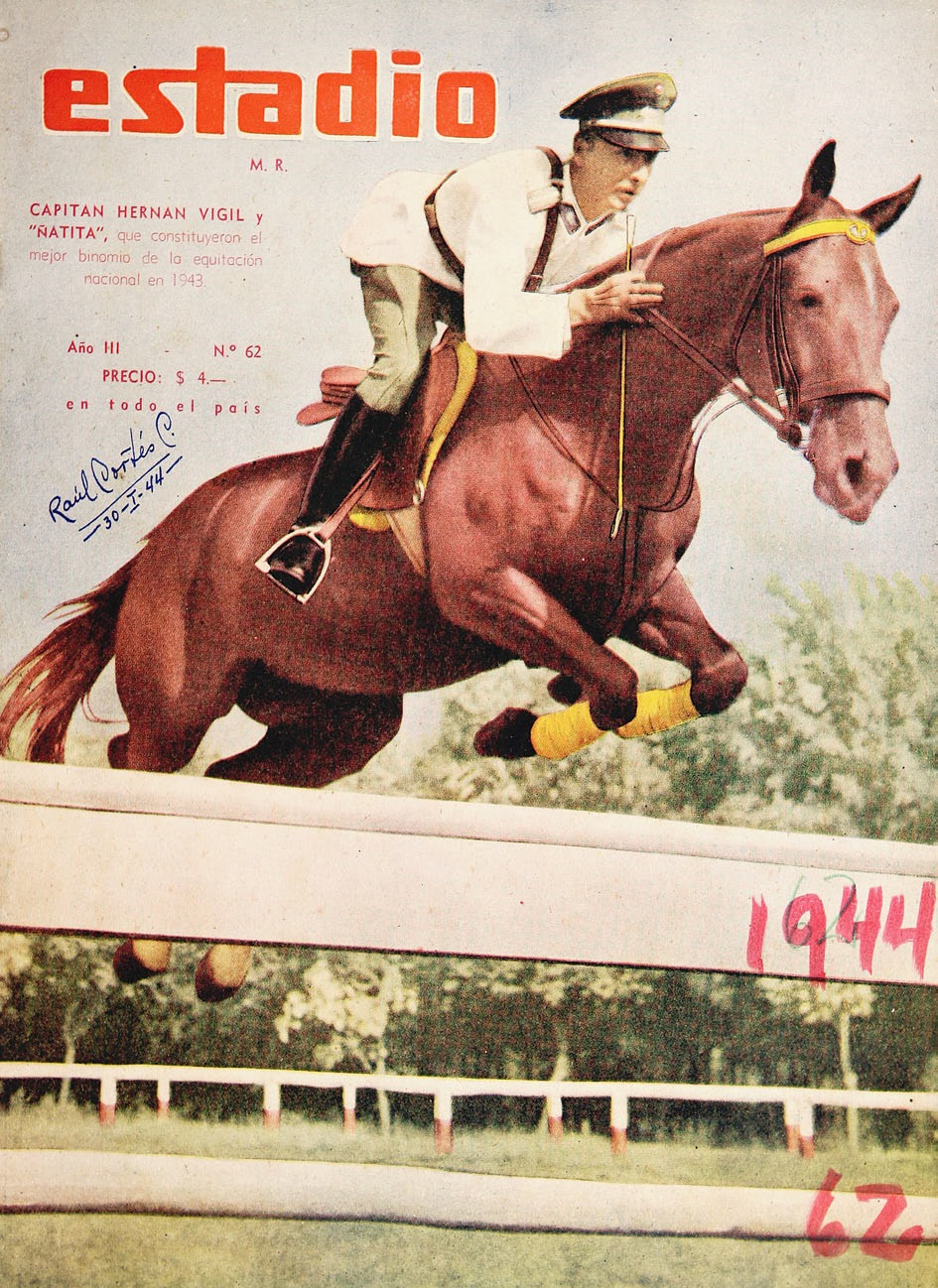

Personal information
- Born: 29 July 1910 Viña del Mar, Chile
- Died: 1 June 1979 (aged 68)

Sport
- Sport: Equestrian
Medal record
Equestrian
Representing Chile
Pan American Games
Silver medal – second place	1951 Buenos Aires	Team eventing
Bronze medal – third place	1951 Buenos Aires	Individual eventing

Hernán Vigil (29 July 1910 – 1 June 1979) was a Chilean equestrian. He competed in two events at the 1952 Summer Olympics.
