= Ilmari Haimi =

Finnish equestrian

Personal information
- Nationality: Finnish
- Born: 6 March 1908; Lappeenranta, Finland
- Died: 13 July 1979 (aged 71)

Sport
- Sport: Equestrian

Ilmari Haimi (6 March 1908 – 13 July 1979) was a Finnish equestrian. He competed in two events at the 1952 Summer Olympics, finishing 32nd in the individual event.
