= Gottfried Reinhold Treviranus =

German physician, naturalist, and proto-evolutionary biologist

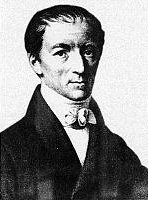
- Born: 4 February 1776; Bremen, Germany
- Died: 16 February 1837 (aged 61); Bremen, Germany
- Education: University of Göttingen
- Known for: Biology, Transmutation of species
- Scientific career
- Fields: Biology, Mathematics, Medicine
- Workplaces: German Academy of Sciences Leopoldina, Royal Swedish Academy of Sciences
- Academic advisors: Johann Friedrich Blumenbach

Gottfried Reinhold Treviranus (4 February 1776, Bremen – 16 February 1837, Bremen) was a German medical doctor, naturalist, and proto-evolutionary biologist.

His younger brother, Ludolph Christian Treviranus (1779–1864), was also a naturalist and botanist, and also a notable taxonomist and zoologist.

== History ==
Treviranus was born in Bremen and studied medicine at the University of Göttingen, where he took his doctor's degree in 1796.

During the following year, he was appointed professor of medicine and mathematics at the Bremen Lyceum. In 1816, he was elected a corresponding member of the Royal Swedish Academy of Sciences.

=== Works ===
Treviranus was a proponent of the theory of the transmutation of species, a theory of evolution held by some biologists prior to the work of Charles Darwin. He put forward this belief in the first volume of his Biologie; oder die Philosophie der lebenden Natur, published in 1802, the same year similar opinions were expressed by Jean-Baptiste Lamarck.

In the 1830s, he was the first to identify rod photoreceptor cells in the retina using a microscope.

==== Selected writings ====
- Biologie; oder die Philosophie der lebenden Natur für Naturforscher und Aerzte, (1802–22).
- Beiträge zur Lehre von den Gesichtswerkzeugen und dem Sehen des Menschen und der Thiere, (1828).
- Beiträge zur Aufklärung der Erscheinungen und Gesetze des organischen Lebens (with Ludolph Christian Treviranus), (1835–38).
