= Mark Darley =

Irish equestrian (1926–1991)

Personal information
- Nationality: Irish
- Born: 6 April 1926 Bradford-on-Avon, England
- Died: 1991 (aged 64–65)

Sport
- Sport: Equestrian

Mark Darley (6 April 1926 – 1991) was an Irish equestrian. He competed in two events at the 1952 Summer Olympics.
