= Petre Andreanu =

Romanian equestrian

Personal information
- Nationality: Romanian
- Born: 1 March 1917

Sport
- Sport: Equestrian

Petre Andreanu (born 1 March 1917, date of death unknown) was a Romanian equestrian. He competed in two events at the 1952 Summer Olympics.
