= Lucio Manzin =

Italian equestrian

Personal information
- Nationality: Italian
- Born: 21 August 1913; Gradisca d'Isonzo, Italy
- Died: 7 August 1988 (aged 74)

Sport
- Sport: Equestrian

Lucio Manzin (21 August 1913 – 7 August 1988) was an Italian equestrian. He competed in two events at the 1952 Summer Olympics.
