= Larry McGuinness =

Canadian equestrian

Personal information
- Born: 24 June 1920; Montreal, Quebec, Canada
- Died: 27 December 2017 (aged 97); Lauderdale-by-the-Sea, Florida, United States

Sport
- Sport: Equestrian

Lawrence Joseph McGuinness (24 June 1920 – 27 December 2017) was a Canadian equestrian. He competed in two events at the 1952 Summer Olympics.
