= Werner Kilcher =

Swiss equestrian

Personal information
- Nationality: Swiss
- Born: 13 June 1927
- Died: 1995 (aged 67–68)

Sport
- Sport: Equestrian

Werner Kilcher (13 June 1927 – 1995) was a Swiss equestrian. He competed in two events at the 1952 Summer Olympics.
