= Porfirio Becerril =

Mexican diver

Personal information
- Born: 31 July 1955 (age 70)

Sport
- Sport: Diving
Medal record
Representing Mexico
Central American and Caribbean Games
Silver medal – second place	1974 Santo Domingo	3m springboard
Bronze medal – third place	1978 Medellin	3m springboard

Porfirio Becerril (born 31 July 1955) is a Mexican former diver who competed in two Olympics: the 1972 Summer Olympics and the 1976 Summer Olympics.
