= Ludolph Christian Treviranus =

German botanist

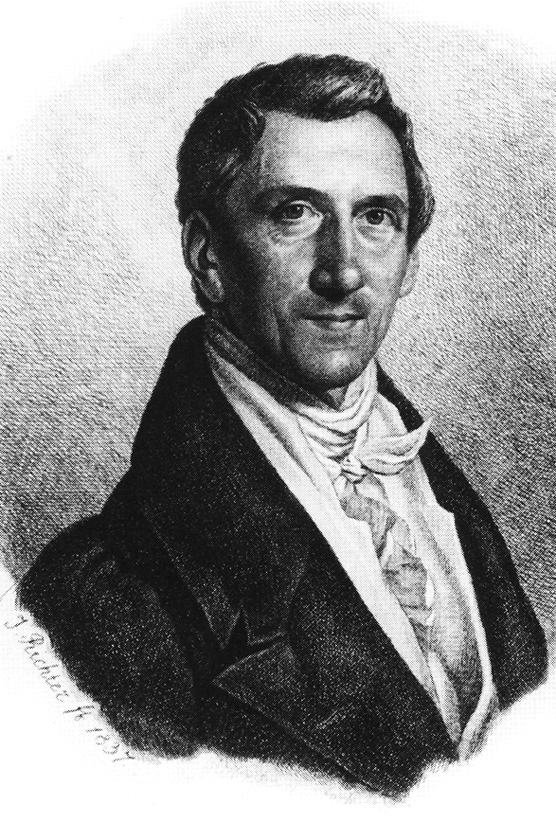
- Ludolph Christian Treviranus in 1837
- Born: 18 September 1779; Bremen, Germany
- Died: 6 May 1864 (aged 86); Bonn, North Rhine-Westphalia, Germany
- Education: University of Jena
- Known for: Plant physiology
- Scientific career
- Fields: Botany, Medicine
- Workplaces: University of Rostock, University of Breslau, University of Bonn
- Author abbrev. (botany): Trevir.

Ludolph Christian Treviranus (18 September 1779 in Bremen – 6 May 1864 in Bonn) was a German botanist born in Bremen. He was a younger brother to naturalist Gottfried Reinhold Treviranus (1776–1837).

In 1801 he earned his doctorate at the University of Jena, where he had as instructors; botanist August Batsch (1761–1802) and philosophers Friedrich Schelling (1775–1854) and Johann Gottlieb Fichte (1762–1814). In 1807 he was a professor at the Lyceum at Bremen, and in 1812 became a professor of natural history and botany at the University of Rostock, where he was also director of the botanical gardens. In 1816 he replaced Johann Heinrich Friedrich Link (1767–1851) as professor of botany at the University of Breslau, and in 1820 transferred to the University of Bonn, where he was successor to Christian Gottfried Daniel Nees von Esenbeck (1776–1858). Treviranus remained at Bonn until his death in 1864.

In his earlier studies, he worked mostly in the fields of plant anatomy and physiology, afterwards focusing on taxonomic issues. Between 1815 and 1828, he published noted works on the sexuality and embryology of phanerogams. He is credited for discovery of the intercellular space in a plant's parenchyma.

The botanical genus Trevirana (Gesneriaceae) was named in his honor by Carl Ludwig Willdenow (1765–1812).

== Selected writings ==
- Vom inwendigen Bau der Gewächse (On the inward construction of plants), (1806).
- Beiträge zur Pflanzenphysiologie (Contributions to plant physiology), (1811).
- Von der Entwickelung des Embryo und seiner Umhüllungen im Pflanzenei (On the development of the embryo and its sheaths in Pflanzenei), (1815).
- De ovo vegetabili ejusque mutationibus observationes recentiores, (1828).
- Physiologie der Gewächse (Physiology of plants, two volumes), (1835–38).
