= Mario Leuenberg =

Chilean equestrian (born 1923)

Personal information
- Nationality: Chilean
- Born: 27 December 1923

Sport
- Sport: Equestrian
Medal record
Equestrian
Representing Chile
Pan American Games
Bronze medal – third place	1955 Mexico City	Team jumping

Mario Leuenberg (born 27 December 1923) was a Chilean equestrian. He competed in two events at the 1952 Summer Olympics.
