= Pericles Cavalcanti =

Brazilian equestrian (1926–2020)

Pericles Cavalcanti (22 August 1926 – 28 October 2020) was a Brazilian equestrian who competed in the 1952 Summer Olympics.
