= Reg Hindley =

British equestrian (1914–1972)

Personal information
- Nationality: British
- Born: 19 January 1914 Burnley, England
- Died: 12 October 1972 (aged 58) Newmarket, England

Sport
- Sport: Equestrian
Medal record
Equestrian
Representing Great Britain
European Championships
Gold medal – first place	1953 Badminton	Team eventing

Reg Hindley (19 January 1914 – 12 October 1972) was a British equestrian. He competed in two events at the 1952 Summer Olympics.
