= Pedro Mercado (equestrian) =

Argentine equestrian

Personal information
- Born: 29 June 1923 San Rafael, Argentina
- Died: 2 April 2001 (aged 77)

Sport
- Sport: Equestrian
Medal record
Equestrian
Representing Argentina
Pan American Games
Gold medal – first place	1951 Buenos Aires	Team eventing

Pedro Mercado (29 June 1923 – 2 April 2001) was an Argentine equestrian. He competed in two events at the 1952 Summer Olympics.
