= Krastyo Gochev =

Bulgarian equestrian (born 1917)

Personal information
- Nationality: Bulgarian
- Born: 30 October 1917

Sport
- Sport: Equestrian

Krastyo Gochev (Bulgarian: Кръстю Гочев, born 30 October 1917, date of death unknown) was a Bulgarian equestrian. He competed in two events at the 1952 Summer Olympics. Gochev is deceased.
