= Charles-Philbert de Couët de Lorry =

French equestrian

Personal information
- Nationality: French
- Born: 27 August 1911; Pont-à-Mousson, France
- Died: 27 February 1981 (aged 69); Paris, France

Sport
- Sport: Equestrian

Charles-Philbert de Couët de Lorry (27 August 1911 – 27 February 1981) was a French equestrian. He competed in two events at the 1952 Summer Olympics.
