= Wiel Hendrickx =

Dutch equestrian (1908–1984)

Personal information
- Nationality: Dutch
- Born: 3 February 1908 Heel, Netherlands
- Died: 18 March 1984 (aged 76) Grathem, Netherlands

Sport
- Sport: Equestrian

Wiel Hendrickx (3 February 1908 – 18 March 1984) was a Dutch equestrian. He competed in two events at the 1952 Summer Olympics.
