= André de la Simone =

French equestrian

Personal information
- Nationality: French
- Born: 11 September 1907; Douai, France
- Died: 29 October 1967 (aged 60); Sarthe, France

Sport
- Sport: Equestrian

André de la Simone (11 September 1907 – 29 October 1967) was a French equestrian. He competed in two events at the 1952 Summer Olympics.
