= Jörg Ziegler =

Swiss equestrian (born 1927)

Jürg Ziegler
Personal information
- Full name: Jürgen Hans Ziegler
- Nationality: Swiss
- Born: 16 March 1927

Sport
- Sport: Equestrian

Jürg Ziegler (born 16 March 1927) was a Swiss equestrian. He competed in two events at the 1952 Summer Olympics.
