= Walter Staley =

American equestrian

Olympic medal record

Equestrian

Representing the United States

Olympic Games
Bronze medal – third place	1952 Helsinki	Team Eventing

Pan American Games
Gold medal – first place	1955 Mexico City	Individual eventing
Silver medal – second place	1959 Chicago	Team eventing

Walter Goodwin Staley, Jr. (October 20, 1932 – October 10, 2010) was an American equestrian who competed at the Olympic Summer Games 1952, 1956 and 1960. In 1952, he won a bronze medal at the three-day team event in Helsinki. At 19, he was the youngest equestrian athlete at the Games. Staley was born in St. Louis, Missouri and died in Mexico, Missouri.
