= John Wofford =

American equestrian (1931–2021)

Personal information
- Born: April 11, 1931 Washington, DC
- Died: August 22, 2021 (aged 90) Toms River, New Jersey

Sport
- Country: United States
- Sport: Equestrian
Medal record
Equestrian
Representing United States
Olympic Games
Bronze medal – third place	1952 Helsinki	Team eventing

John E. B. Wofford (April 11, 1931 – August 22, 2021) was an American equestrian and Olympic medalist. He won a bronze medal in eventing at the 1952 Summer Olympics in Helsinki. He was born in Washington, D.C. He competed on his father's horse, Benny Grimes.
