= Thomas Gayford =

Canadian equestrian (1928–2026)

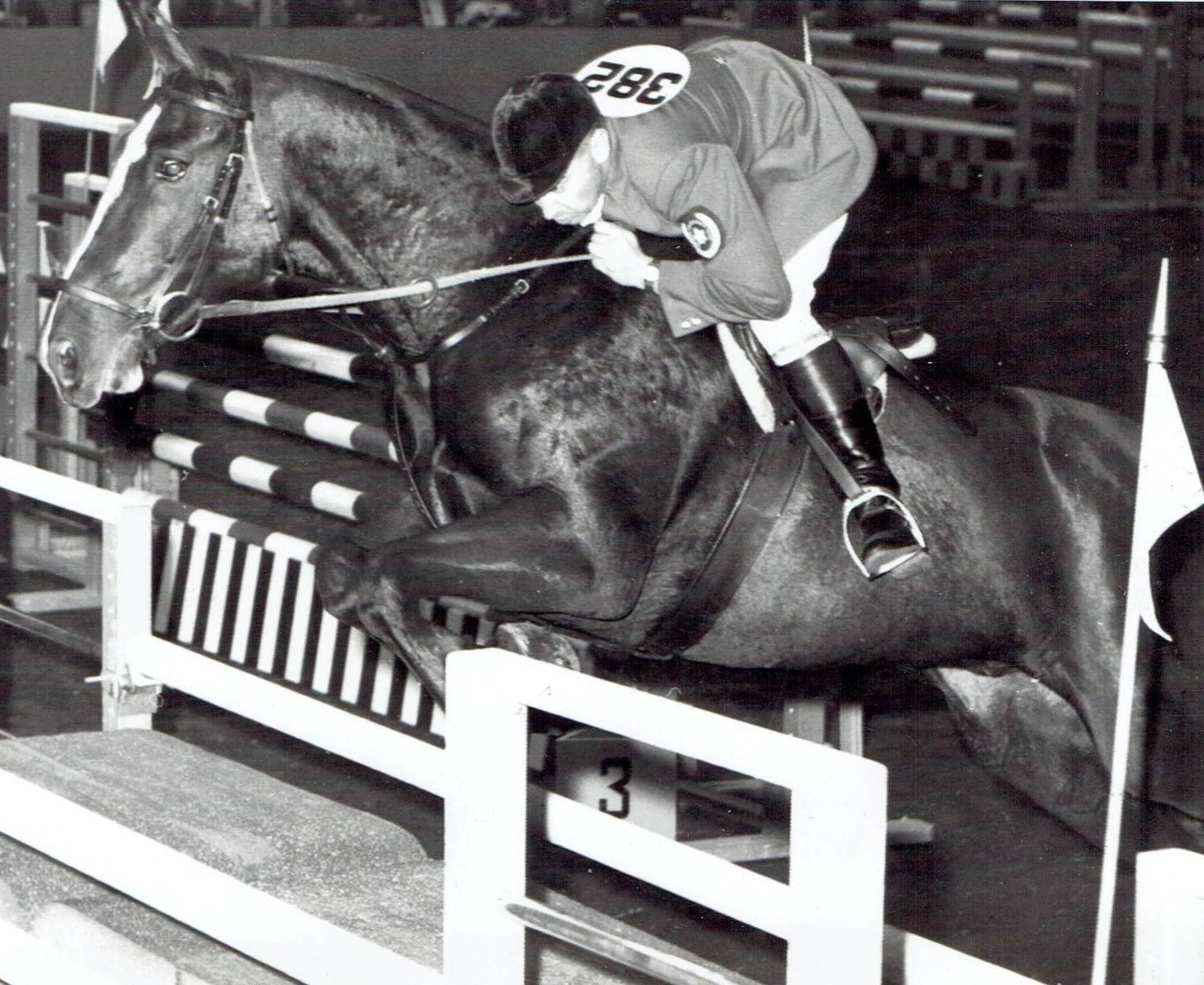
- Gayford in 1964

Personal information
- Born: November 21, 1928 Toronto, Ontario, Canada
- Died: April 26, 2026 (aged 97)
- Height: 172 cm (5 ft 8 in)
- Weight: 70 kg (154 lb)

Sport
- Sport: Equestrian
- Events: Show jumping, 3-day event
Medal record
Representing Canada
Olympic Games
| Gold medal – first place | 1968 Mexico City | Team jumping |
Pan American Games
| Gold medal – first place | 1959 Chicago | Team eventing |
| Gold medal – first place | 1971 Cali | Team jumping |
| Bronze medal – third place | 1967 Winnipeg | Team jumping |
World Championships
| Gold medal – first place | 1970 La Baule | Team jumping |

Thomas Franklin Gayford (November 21, 1928 – April 26, 2026) was a Canadian equestrian. He competed at the 1952 and 1960 Olympics in the individual and team three-day events, but failed to finish. At the 1968 Olympics he won a gold medal in show jumping with the Canadian team.

== Biography ==
Gayford was the son of Gordon Gayford, who competed internationally in horse riding. He was educated at the University of Toronto Schools.

He was a member of the Canadian Equestrian Team for show jumping from the late 1940s through the early 1970s, winning team gold medals at the 1968 Olympics, 1970 World Championships and 1971 Pan American Games, and placing third at the 1967 Pan American Games. Gayford also won a team gold medal in the three-day event at the 1959 Pan American Games. Individually he won the New York International Horse Show three times.

Gayford retired before the 1972 Olympics to become an equestrian coach, judge, and course designer. He designed the jumping course at the 1976 Summer Olympics in Montreal, and headed the Canadian national jumping team from 1978 through 1996. He was inducted into the Canada's Sports Hall of Fame in 1968 and to the Canadian Olympic Hall of Fame in 1971.

Gayford died on April 26, 2026, at the age of 97.
