= Rolando Mosqueira =

Chilean equestrian (born 1920)

Personal information
- Nationality: Chilean
- Born: 30 August 1920

Sport
- Sport: Equestrian
Medal record
Equestrian
Representing Chile
Pan American Games
Silver medal – second place	1951 Buenos Aires	Team eventing

Rolando Mosqueira (born 30 August 1920, date of death unknown) was a Chilean equestrian. He competed in two events at the 1952 Summer Olympics.
