= Veikko Vartiainen =

Finnish equestrian

Personal information
- Nationality: Finnish
- Born: 20 August 1913; Tampere, Finland
- Died: 11 January 1981 (aged 67); Helsinki, Finland

Sport
- Sport: Equestrian

Veikko Vartiainen (20 August 1913 – 11 January 1981) was a Finnish equestrian. He competed at the 1948 Summer Olympics and the 1952 Summer Olympics.
