= Mario Becerril =

Mexican equestrian (1917–2018)

Mario Becerril Serrano (5 August 1917 – 7 December 2018) was a Mexican equestrian who competed in the 1952 Summer Olympics. He turned 100 in August 2017, and died on 7 December 2018.
