= Rashko Fratev =

Bulgarian equestrian

Rashko Fratev (Bulgarian: Рашко Фратев; 23 January 1925 – 23 March 2016) was a Bulgarian equestrian who competed in the 1952 Summer Olympics and in the 1956 Summer Olympics.
