= Valerian Kuybyshev (equestrian) =

Soviet equestrian

Personal information
- Nationality: Soviet
- Born: 3 December 1925
- Died: 2006

Sport
- Sport: Equestrian

Valerian Kuybyshev (born 3 December 1925 – 2006) was a Soviet equestrian. He competed at the 1952 Summer Olympics and the 1956 Summer Olympics.
