= Hans Christian Andersen (equestrian) =

Danish equestrian

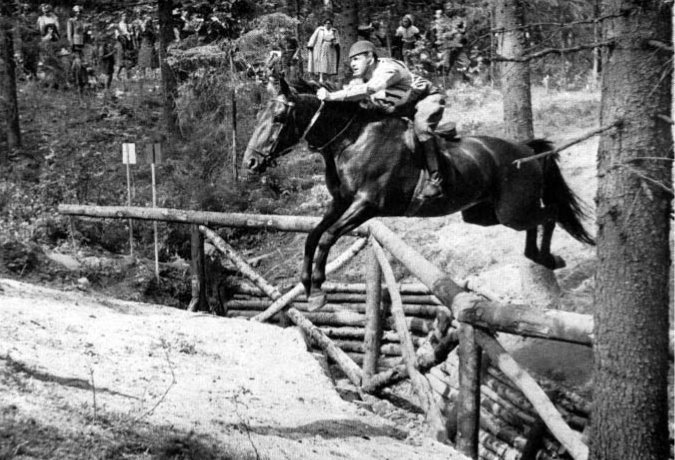
- Andersen at the 1952 Summer Olympics

Personal information
- Nationality: Danish
- Born: 24 February 1914; Odense, Denmark
- Died: 20 March 1993 (aged 79); Odense, Denmark

Sport
- Sport: Equestrian

Hans Christian Andersen (24 February 1914 – 20 March 1993) was a Danish equestrian. He completed at the 1952 Summer Olympics and the 1956 Summer Olympics.
