= Carlos Villanueva (equestrian) =

Argentine equestrian (1918–2011)

Personal information
- Full name: Carlos Elias Villanueva
- Born: 30 July 1918; Mendoza, Argentina
- Died: 30 April 2011 (aged 92)

Sport
- Sport: Equestrian

Carlos Elias Villanueva (30 July 1918 – 30 April 2011) was an Argentine equestrian. He competed in two events at the 1952 Summer Olympics.

Villanueva died on 30 April 2011, at the age of 92.
