= Charles Hough Jr. =

American equestrian (1934–2023)

Medal record

Equestrian

Representing United States

Olympic Games
| Bronze medal – third place | 1952 Helsinki | Team eventing |

Charles "Champ" Hough Jr. (May 3, 1934 – March 27, 2023) was an American equestrian and Olympic medallist.

He won a bronze medal in eventing at the 1952 Summer Olympics in Helsinki. He was the youngest equestrian competitor at the games. He was the father of the American equestrian Lauren Hough. Hough died on March 27, 2023, at the age of 88.
