= Jorge Cánaves =

Argentine equestrian

Personal information
- Nationality: Argentine
- Born: 6 September 1922
- Died: 9 October 2004 (aged 82); Buenos Aires, Argentina

Sport
- Sport: Equestrian

Jorge Cánaves (6 September 1922 – 9 October 2004) was an Argentine equestrian. He competed at the 1952 Summer Olympics and the 1964 Summer Olympics.
