= Harry Freeman-Jackson =

Irish equestrian

Personal information
- Nationality: Irish
- Born: 23 December 1910 Rawalpindi, British India (present-day Pakistan)
- Died: 21 July 1993 (aged 82) Mallow, Ireland

Sport
- Sport: Equestrian
Medal record
Equestrian
Representing Ireland
European Championships
| Silver medal – second place | 1962 Burghley | Team eventing |

Harry Freeman-Jackson (23 December 1910 – 21 July 1993) was an Irish equestrian. He competed at the 1952, 1956, 1960 and the 1964 Summer Olympics.
