= Nicolae Marcoci =

Romanian equestrian (1923–1999)

Personal information
- Nationality: Romanian
- Born: 1923 Iași, Kingdom of Romania
- Died: December 1999 (aged 75–76)

Sport
- Sport: Equestrian

Nicolae Marcoci (1923 – December 1999) was a Romanian equestrian. He competed in two events at the 1956 Summer Olympics. Marcoci died in December 1999.
