= Max van Loon =

Dutch equestrian

Personal information
- Nationality: Dutch
- Born: 13 January 1927; Tilburg, Netherlands
- Died: 3 June 2000 (aged 73); Eindhoven, Netherlands

Sport
- Sport: Equestrian

Max van Loon (13 January 1927 – 3 June 2000) was a Dutch equestrian. He competed in two events at the 1952 Summer Olympics.
