= Ian Hume-Dudgeon =

Irish equestrian (1924–2001)

Personal information
- Nationality: Irish
- Born: 21 June 1924; Sandhurst, England
- Died: 22 September 2001 (aged 77); Isle of Man

Sport
- Sport: Equestrian

Ian Hume-Dudgeon (21 June 1924 – 22 September 2001) was an Irish equestrian. He competed at the 1952 Summer Olympics, the 1956 Summer Olympics and the 1960 Summer Olympics.
