= Folke Frölén =

Swedish equestrian

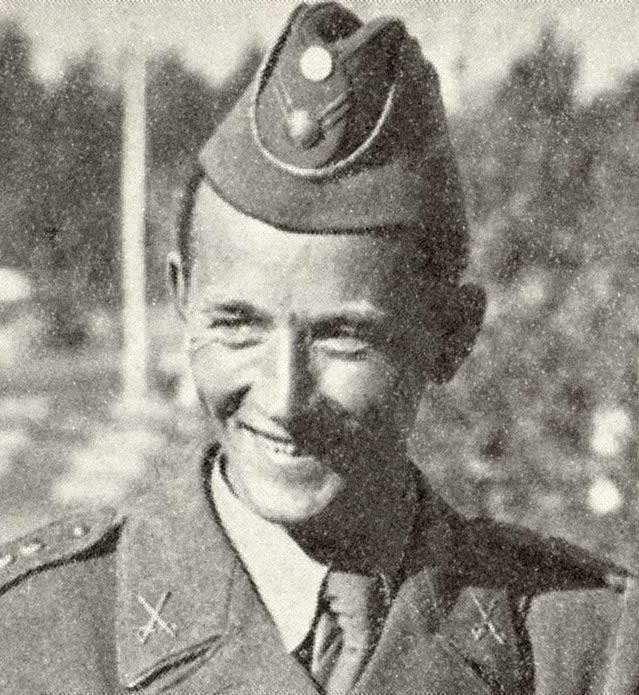

Personal information
- Born: 25 February 1908 Eskilstuna, Sweden
- Died: 6 November 2002 (aged 94) Umeå, Sweden

Sport
- Sport: Horse riding
- Club: K4 IF, Umeå
Medal record
Representing Sweden
Olympic Games
Gold medal – first place	1952 Helsinki	Team eventing

Karl Folke Frölén (25 February 1908 – 6 November 2002) was a Swedish horse rider who competed in the 1952 Summer Olympics. He and his horse Fair finished 15th in the individual eventing competition and won a gold medal with the Swedish eventing team.
