= Henry Stewart Treviranus =

Canadian equestrian

Personal information
- Nationality: Canadian
- Born: 19 September 1918 Cuxhaven, Germany
- Died: 29 February 2008 (aged 89) Lake Ridge, Virginia, United States

Sport
- Sport: Equestrian

Henry Stewart Treviranus (19 September 1918 – 29 February 2008) was a Canadian equestrian. He competed in two events at the 1952 Summer Olympics.

== Early life ==
Born in 1918, he was the son of German-Scottish Gottfried Reinhold Treviranus and Elisabeth Dryander.
