= Hannelore Weygand =

West German equestrian

Medal record

Equestrian

Representing Germany

Olympic Games
Silver medal – second place	1956 Melbourne	Mixed Dressage, Team

Hannelore Weygand (30 October 1924 – 18 December 2017) was a German equestrian, born in Düsseldorf. She competed in equestrian at the 1956 Summer Olympics in Stockholm, where she won a silver medal in the team competition in mixed dressage (along with Anneliese Küppers and Liselott Linsenhoff).
