= Otto Mønsted Acthon =

Danish equestrian

Personal information
- Nationality: Danish
- Born: 21 December 1917; Copenhagen, Denmark
- Died: 13 August 1980 (aged 62); Odder, Denmark

Sport
- Sport: Equestrian

Otto Mønsted Acthon (21 December 1917 – 13 August 1980) was a Danish equestrian. He competed in the 1948 and 1952 Summer Olympics.
