= Anneliese Küppers =

German equestrian (1929–2010)

Medal record

Equestrian

Representing Germany

Olympic Games
Silver medal – second place	1956 Melbourne	Mixed Dressage, Team

Anneliese Küppers (6 August 1929 – 24 September 2010) was a German equestrian. She was born in Duisburg. She competed in equestrian at the 1956 Summer Olympics in Stockholm, where she won a silver medal in the team competition in mixed dressage (along with Hannelore Weygand and Liselott Linsenhoff).
