= Ernest van Loon =

Dutch equestrian

Personal information
- Nationality: Dutch
- Born: 2 February 1921; Tilburg, Netherlands
- Died: 26 June 2009 (aged 88); Breda, Netherlands

Sport
- Sport: Equestrian

Ernest van Loon (2 February 1921 – 26 June 2009) was a Dutch equestrian. He competed at the 1948 Summer Olympics and the 1952 Summer Olympics.
