= Else Christophersen =

Norwegian equestrian (1915–1968)

Personal information
- Born: 11 February 1915; Kristiania, Norway
- Died: 3 July 1968 (aged 53)

Sport
- Sport: Equestrian

Else Christophersen (11 February 1915 – 3 July 1968) was a Norwegian equestrian. She was born in Kristiania. She competed in equestrian at the 1956 Summer Olympics in Stockholm, where she placed 13th in individual mixed dressage, and seventh in the team competition (along with Anne-Lise Kielland and Bodil Russ).
