= Anne-Lise Kielland =

Norwegian equestrian (1919–2005)

Personal information
- Nationality: Norwegian
- Born: 28 October 1919 Kristiania
- Died: 21 July 2005 (aged 85)

Sport
- Sport: Equestrian

Anne-Lise Kielland (28 October 1919 – 21 July 2005) was a Norwegian equestrian. She was born in Kristiania. She competed in equestrian at the 1956 Summer Olympics in Stockholm, where she placed 27th in individual mixed dressage, and seventh in the team competition (along with Else Christophersen and Bodil Russ).
