= Boris Lilov =

Soviet equestrian

Personal information
- Nationality: Soviet
- Born: 24 May 1923 Klinsky Uyezd, Moscow Governorate, Russian SFSR, Soviet Union
- Died: May 1969

Sport
- Sport: Equestrian

Boris Lilov (24 May 1923 – May 1969) was a Soviet equestrian. He competed at the 1952 Summer Olympics and the 1956 Summer Olympics.
