= Hans von Blixen-Finecke Jr. =

Swedish equestrian

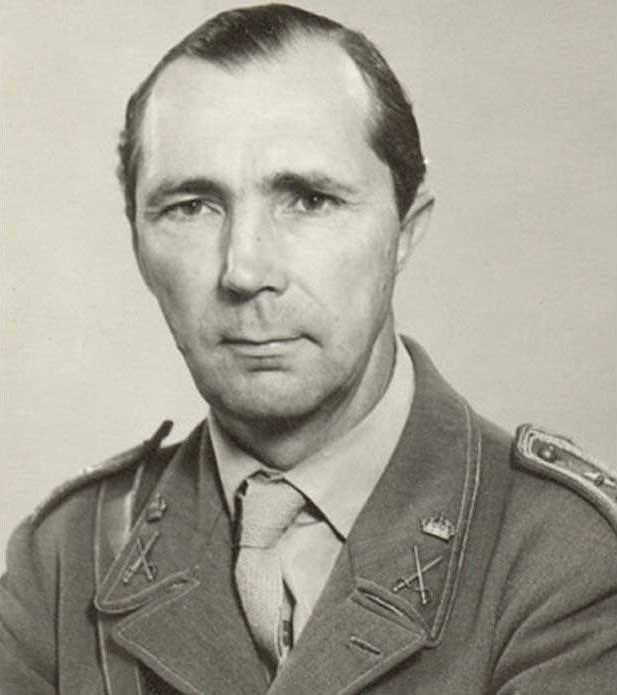
- Born: Nils Gustaf Fredrik Bror von Blixen-Finecke; 20 July 1916; Linköping, Sweden
- Died: 16 February 2005 (aged 88); Penzance, United Kingdom
- Relatives: Hans von Blixen-Finecke (father); Bror von Blixen-Finecke (uncle)
- Military career
- Branch: Swedish Army
- Service years: 1937–1964
- Rank: Lieutenant colonel
- Commands: Swedish Army Riding and Horse-Driving School (1959–64)

Olympic medal record

Equestrian

Representing Sweden
Gold medal – first place	1952 Helsinki	Individual eventing
Gold medal – first place	1952 Helsinki	Team eventing

Baron Nils Gustaf Fredrik Bror "Hans" von Blixen-Finecke Jr. (20 July 1916 – 16 February 2005) was a Swedish Army officer and horse rider. He competed in the three-day eventing at the 1952 and 1956 Summer Olympics and won individual and team gold medals in 1952.

== Early life ==
Von Blixen-Finecke was born on 20 July 1916 in Linköping, Sweden, the son of Baron Hans von Blixen-Finecke, who won an Olympic bronze in dressage in 1912, and his wife Baroness Brita Trolle. He was the nephew of Bror von Blixen-Finecke and writer Karen Blixen. He was born as Nils Gustaf Fredrik Bror, but since the age of one was called Hans after his father, who died in an airplane crash. He passed studentexamen at Sigtunaskolan Humanistiska Läroverket in 1934.

== Career ==
von Blixen-Finecke Jr. was commissioned as an officer in 1937, serving in the Life Regiment of Horse (K 1). In 1950, he was promoted to ryttmästare in the Life Regiment Hussars (K 3) and to major in North Scanian Infantry Regiment (I 6) in 1957. von Blixen-Finecke served as commanding officer of the Swedish Army Riding and Horse-Driving School from 1959 to 1964. In 1964 he left the Swedish Army and moved to England, where he established his own equestrian centre in Surrey before moving in the early 1970s to Cornwall.

== Personal life ==
In 1941, he married Baroness Anna Beck-Friis (1921-1985), the daughter of Baron Jochum Beck-Friis and Signe Grenander, with whom he had two children, Hans (born 1942) and Gustaf (born 1945). In 1959, he married Anne Hetherington (born 1923), the daughter of Harry Hetherington and Merriell MacMahon.

== Awards and decorations ==
- (Sweden) Knight of the Order of the Sword
- (Denmark) Knight of the Order of the Dannebrog
- (Sweden) Ryttarolympisk förtjänstguldmedalj ("Olympic Equestrian Medal of Merit in Gold")
- (Sweden) Svensk ridsports guldmedalj ("Swedish Equestrian Sport Gold Medal")
- (Sweden) Svensk ridsports hederstecken ("Swedish Equestrian Sport Badge of Honor")

Military offices
Preceded by Gustaf Nyblæus	Swedish Army Riding and Horse-Driving School; 1959–1964	Succeeded by Berthold Dieden
