= Aleksandr Vtorov =

Soviet equestrian

Personal information
- Nationality: Soviet Union
- Born: 1916 Russian Empire

Sport
- Sport: Equestrian

Aleksandr Vtorov (born 1916, date of death unknown) was a Soviet equestrian. He competed in two events at the 1956 Summer Olympics.
