= Joaquim Silva (equestrian) =

Portuguese equestrian

Personal information
- Full name: Joaquim Miguel Matos Fernandes Duarte Silva
- Nationality: Portuguese
- Born: 17 March 1924; Évora, Portugal
- Died: 16 June 2007 (aged 83); Lisbon, Portugal

Sport
- Sport: Equestrian

Joaquim Miguel Matos Fernandes Duarte Silva (17 March 1924 – 16 June 2007) was a Portuguese equestrian. He competed at the 1952, 1956, 1960 and the 1964 Summer Olympics.
