= Bodil Russ =

Norwegian equestrian (1908–1998)

Personal information
- Born: 16 September 1908; Vestre Aker, Norway
- Died: 31 October 1998 (aged 90)

Sport
- Sport: Equestrian

Bodil Russ (16 September 1908 – 31 October 1998) was a Norwegian equestrian. She was born in Vestre Aker. She competed in equestrian at the 1956 Summer Olympics in Stockholm, where she placed 29th in individual mixed dressage, and seventh in the team competition (along with Else Christophersen and Anne-Lise Kielland).
