= António de Almeida (equestrian) =

Portuguese equestrian (1915–1994)

Personal information
- Nationality: Portuguese
- Born: 14 November 1915; Coimbra, Portugal
- Died: 22 August 1994 (aged 78); Lisbon, Portugal

Sport
- Sport: Equestrian

António de Almeida (14 November 1915 – 22 August 1994) was a Portuguese equestrian. He competed at the 1952 Summer Olympics, the 1956 Summer Olympics and the 1960 Summer Olympics.
