= Nicolae Mihalcea =

Romanian equestrian (1922–2018)

Personal information
- Nationality: Romanian
- Born: 20 November 1922; Zărnești, Romania
- Died: 22 November 2018 (aged 96)

Sport
- Sport: Equestrian

Nicolae Mihalcea (20 November 1922 – 22 November 2018) was a Romanian equestrian. He competed at the 1952 Summer Olympics and the 1956 Summer Olympics.
