= Mauno Roiha =

Finnish equestrian (1911–1981)

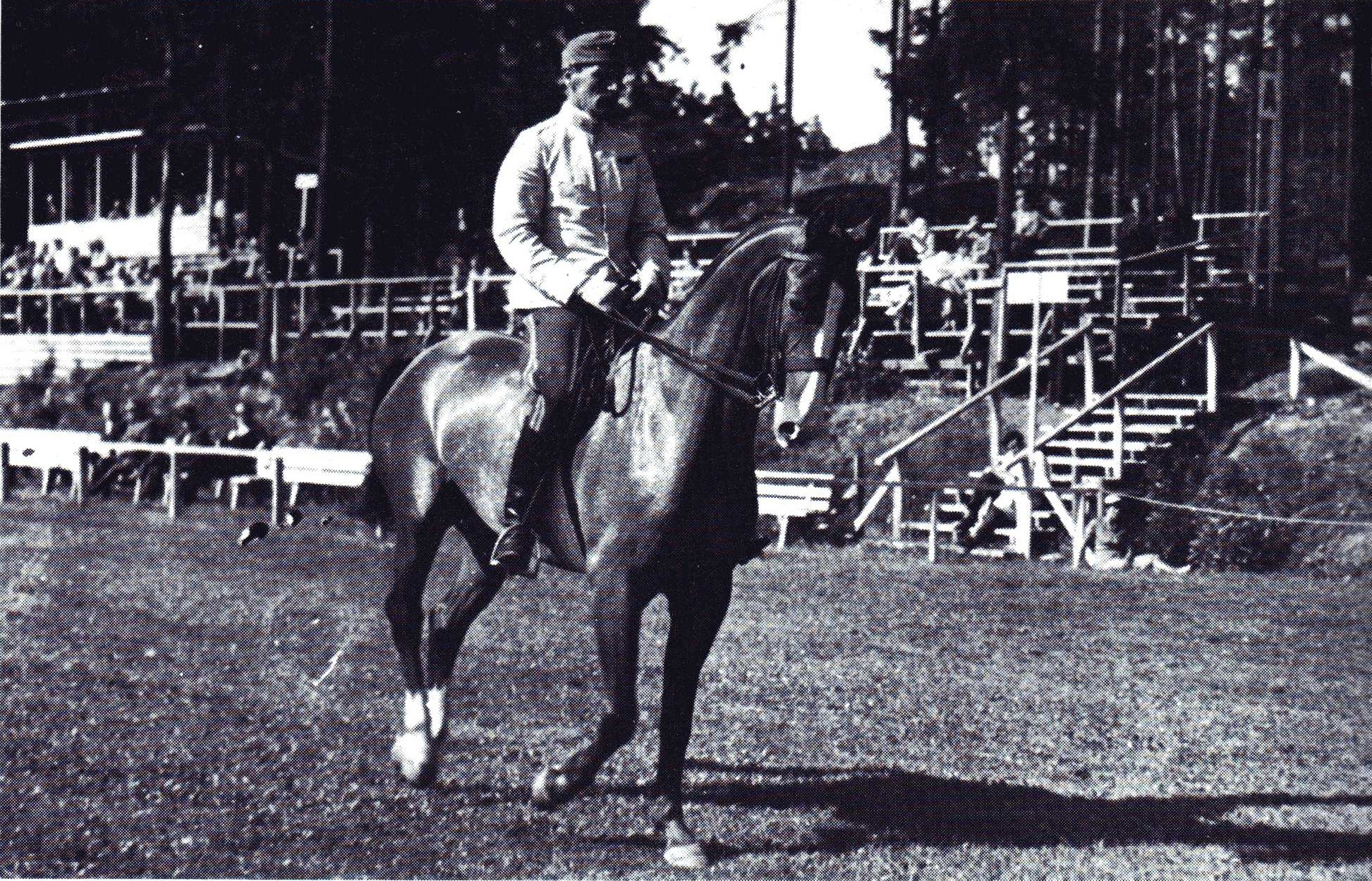
- Mauno Roiha at the 1952 Olympics

Personal information
- Nationality: Finnish
- Born: 6 September 1911; Vyborg, Russia
- Died: 7 March 1981 (aged 69); Lahti, Finland

Sport
- Sport: Equestrian

Mauno Roiha (6 September 1911 – 7 March 1981) was a Finnish equestrian. He competed at the 1948 Summer Olympics, the 1952 Summer Olympics and the 1956 Summer Olympics.
