= Equestrian events at the 1952 Summer Olympics =

Equestrian at the Games of the XV Olympiad
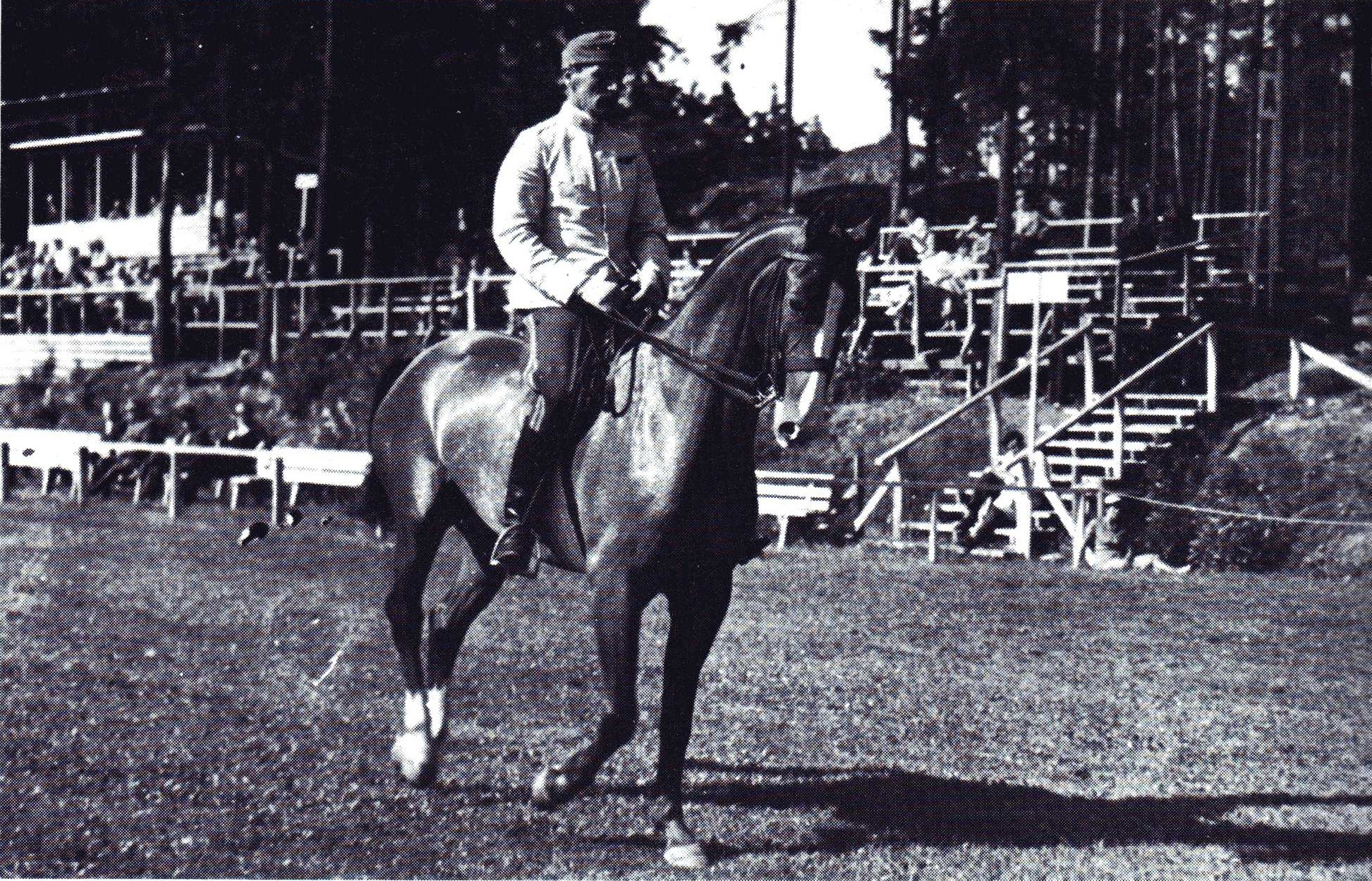
- Mauno Roiha and Laaos practising at the 1952 Olympic Games
- Venue: Laakso; Ruskeasuo Equestrian Hall; Helsinki Olympic Stadium
- No. of events: 6
- Competitors: 134 from 25 nations

The equestrian events at the 1952 Helsinki Summer Olympics included dressage, eventing, and show jumping. All three disciplines had both individual and team competitions and were held from 28 July to 3 August 1952.

One of the biggest changes at the 1952 Olympics was the demographics of competitors. Before this, most of the riders were officers (41 of 44 starters at the 1948 Olympics were riding in uniform), whereas the Helsinki Games saw over 50% of competitors from the civilian ranks. Additionally, women were now allowed to compete for the first time in equestrian events. At the 1952 Games, they were permitted in the dressage competition, although prohibited from the jumping (per a ruling in 1951) and most definitely not in eventing which was considered too dangerous. A total of 4 women competed out of 134 riders.

25 nations competed: Argentina, Brazil, Bulgaria, Canada, Chile, Denmark, Egypt, Finland, France, Federal Republic of Germany, Great Britain, Ireland, Italy, Japan, Korea, Mexico, the Netherlands, Norway, Portugal, Romania, Soviet Union, Spain, Sweden, Switzerland, and the United States. This was the first appearance for Canada, Egypt, and Korea. The Soviet Union appeared for the first time since 1912; Russia had sent riders to the 1912 Games, but had not competed since. The youngest participant was Walter Staley (19) from the United States, while the oldest rider was the Danish Kristian Jensen (63).

== Disciplines ==
=== Show jumping ===
52 riders from 20 nations competed at the 1952 Games. For the first time, individual and team medals were awarded based on a two-round Prix des Nations (Nations Cup). 16 teams rode around Björn Strandell's 786 meter course with a 1 min 57.2 second time allowed and fences up to 1.60 meters in height and a 5-meter water jump. The individual gold was won by the French rider Pierre d'Oriola, aboard the gelding, Ali Baba. D'Oriola would repeat the feat in 1964 and remains the only rider to win two gold medals in this discipline. The team event was won by Great Britain, anchored by a clear round for Harry Llewellyn and Foxhunter. This gold medal, attained on the last day of competition, was Great Britain's only gold of the 1952 Games. They remain the only nation to have won gold medals in every Summer Olympics since 1896.

=== Dressage ===
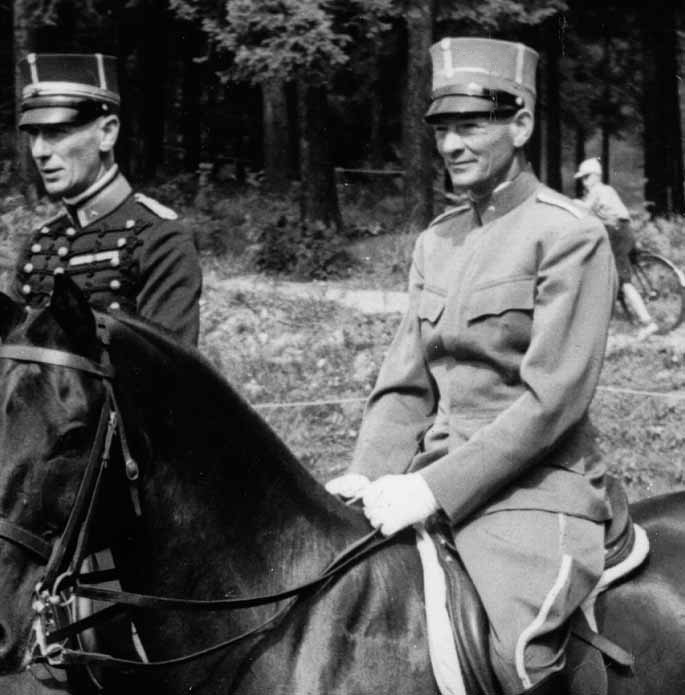
Dressage rider at the 1952 Olympics

27 riders, including for the first time 4 women, from 10 nations rode in the dressage competition. One of these women was Denmark's Lis Hartel, who in 1944, at age 23, had been paralyzed by polio. She gradually regained muscle function but remained paralyzed below the knee. Amazingly, despite not being able to mount or dismount unassisted, she won individual silver.

5 judges were present at the test, with the lowest and highest scores of the panel being dropped (the only time in Olympic dressage history this method was used). The test reintroduction of the piaffe and passage, and was 15 minutes in length.

=== Eventing ===
The eventing competition was slightly harder in 1952 than in 1948. Phase A was 7 km at 240m/min, Phase B (steeplechase) was 4 km at 600m/min, Phase C 15 km at 240 m/min, Phase D (cross-country) was 9 km at 450 m/min with jumping efforts up to 1.20 meters, followed by the final phase which was a 2 km "gallop" at 333m/min. The final stadium jumping round also had fences up to 1.20 meters.

59 riders from 21 countries competed, forming 19 teams. 13 of those teams were strictly officers, while 2 were a mix of officers and civilians (Great Britain and Ireland) and four had civilian-only teams (Canada, Germany, the Netherlands, and the USA). Of the 12 medals awarded between the individual and team competitions, 7 went to civilians.

== Medal summary ==
Event	Gold	Silver	Bronze
Individual dressage	Henri Saint Cyr and Master Rufus; Sweden	Lis Hartel and Jubilee; Denmark	André Jousseaume and Harpagon; France
Team dressage	Sweden; Henri Saint Cyr and Master Rufus; Gustaf Adolf Boltenstern Jr. and Krest; Gehnäll Persson and Knaust	Switzerland; Gottfried Trachsel and Kursus; Henri Chammartin and Wöhler; Gustav Fischer and Soliman	Germany; Heinz Pollay and Adular; Ida von Nagel and Afrika; Fritz Thiedemann and Chronist
Individual eventing	Hans von Blixen-Finecke Jr. and Jubal; Sweden	Guy Lefrant and Verdun; France	Wilhelm Büsing and Hubertus; Germany
Team eventing	Sweden; Hans von Blixen-Finecke Jr. and Jubal; Olof Stahre and Komet; Folke Frölén and Fair	Germany; Wilhelm Büsing and Hubertus; Klaus Wagner and Dachs; Otto Rothe and Trux von Kamax	United States; Charles Hough Jr. and Cassivellannus; Walter Staley, Jr. and Craigwood Park; John Wofford and Benny Grimes
Individual jumping	Pierre Jonquères d'Oriola and Ali Baba; France	Óscar Cristi and Bambi; Chile	Fritz Thiedemann and Meteor; Germany
Team jumping	Great Britain; Wilfred White and Nizefela; Douglas Stewart and Aherlow; Harry Llewellyn and Foxhunter	Chile; Óscar Cristi and Bambi; César Mendoza and Pillán; Ricardo Echeverría and Lindo Peal	United States; William Steinkraus and Hollandia; Arthur McCashin and Miss Budweiser; John William Russell and Democrat

== Medal table ==
Rank	Nation	Gold	Silver	Bronze	Total
1	Sweden	4	0	0	4
2	France	1	1	1	3
3	Great Britain	1	0	0	1
4	Chile	0	2	0	2
5	Germany	0	1	3	4
6	Denmark	0	1	0	1
6	Switzerland	0	1	0	1
8	United States	0	0	2	2
Totals (8 entries)		6	6	6	18

== Participating nations ==
- Argentina (6)
- Brazil (4)
- Bulgaria (3)
- Canada (3)
- Chile (9)
- Denmark (5)
- Egypt (3)
- Finland (5)
- France (9)
- Germany (8)
- Great Britain (6)
- Ireland (3)
- Italy (4)
- Japan (1)
- South Korea (1)
- Mexico (4)
- Netherlands (3)
- Norway (2)
- Portugal (9)
- Romania (6)
- Soviet Union (9)
- Spain (6)
- Sweden (9)
- Switzerland (7)
- United States (9)

== Officials ==
Appointment of officials was as follows:

Dressage

- (Switzerland) Max Thommen (Ground Jury President)
- (Netherlands) Idzard Sirtema van Grovestins (Ground Jury Member)
- (Sweden) Claës König (Ground Jury Member)
- (France) Challan Belval (Ground Jury Member)
- (Belgium) Maj. Hanoteau (Ground Jury Member)

Jumping

- (Finland) Ake Wahlroos (Ground Jury President)
- (Sweden) Arne Francke (Ground Jury Member)
- (Switzerland) Henri von der Weid (Ground Jury Member)
- (United States) Earl F. Thomson (Ground Jury Member)
- (Spain) José M. Cavanillas (Ground Jury Member)
- (Finland) Björn Strandell (Course Designer)

Eventing

- (Italy) Ranieri di Campello (Ground Jury President)
- (Austria) Arthur Kalita (Ground Jury Member)
- (United Kingdom) V.D.S. Williams (Ground Jury Member)
- (Spain) José M. Cavanillas (Ground Jury Member)
- (Norway) Arne Kristensen (Ground Jury Member)
- (Finland) Björn Strandell (Course Designer)
