= Equestrian at the 1956 Summer Olympics – Individual eventing =

Equestrian at the Olympics

Individual eventing at the Games of the XVI Olympiad
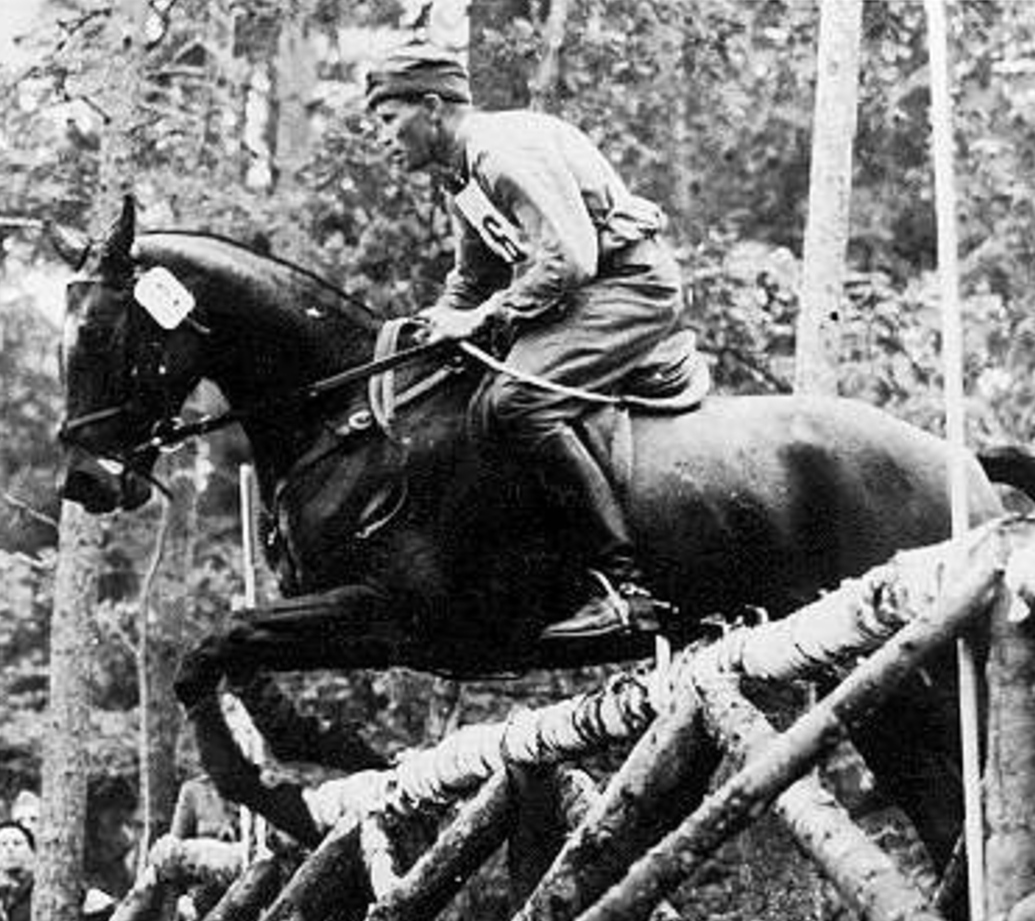
- Petrus Kastenman and Iluster
- Venue: Stockholm Olympic Stadium
- Date: 11–14 June 1956
- Competitors: 56 from 19 nations

Medalists
1st place, gold medalist(s)		Petrus Kastenman	Sweden
2nd place, silver medalist(s)		August Lütke-Westhues	United Team of Germany
3rd place, bronze medalist(s)		Francis Weldon	Great Britain

The individual eventing at the 1956 Summer Olympics took place between 11 and 14 June, at the Stockholm Olympic Stadium. Eventing was open to men only. It was the 9th appearance of the event.

== Competition format ==
The team and individual eventing competitions used the same results. Eventing consisted of a dressage test, a cross-country test, and a jumping test. The competitor with the best total score (fewest penalty points) won.

- Dressage: The eventing competition featured a dressage test. Five judges gave scores.
- Cross-country: The cross-country test had five phases.
  - Phase A: 7.2 km roads. Time allowed was 30 minutes (240 m/min).
  - Phase B: 3.6 km steeplechase. Time allowed was 6 minutes (600 m/min).
  - Phase C: 14.4 km roads. Time allowed was 60 minutes (240 m/min).
  - Phase D: 7.65 km cross-country. Time allowed was 17 minutes (450 m/min). There were 33 obstacles.
  - Phase E: 2 km flat. Time allowed was 6 minutes (333 m/min).
- Jumping: The jumping test had 12 obstacles.

== Results ==
56 riders competed.

=== Standings after dressage ===
Rank	Rider	Horse	Nation	Dressage
1	Otto Rothe	Sissi	United Team of Germany	-98.40
2	Arthur Rook	Wild Venture	Great Britain	-101.60
3	Klaus Wagner	Prinzess	United Team of Germany	-102.40
4	Francis Weldon	Kilbarry	Great Britain	-103.20
5	Roland Perret	Erlfried	Switzerland	-105.60
6	Kari Tolvanen	Lariina	Finland	-107.60
7	Bertie Hill	Countryman III	Great Britain	-108.40
8	Hans von Blixen-Finecke Jr.	Jubal	Sweden	-110.40
9	Valerian Kuybyshev	Perekop	Soviet Union	-110.80
10	Milo Gmür	Romeo	Switzerland	-111.20
11	Alain Bouchet	Ferney	France	-112.40
12	Petrus Kastenman	Iluster	Sweden	-116.40
13	Lev Baklyshkin	Guimnast	Soviet Union	-119.20
14	Johan Asker	Iller	Sweden	-119.60
15	Hans Christian Andersen	Tom	Denmark	-120.40
16	John Rumble	Cilroy	Canada	-122.80
17	Giuseppe Molinari	Uccello	Italy	-124.40
18	Brian Crago	Radar	Australia	-124.80
19	Jean Saint-Fort Paillard	Farceur	France	-125.60
20	Rashko Fratev	Naphtaline	Bulgaria	-126.80
21	Nikolay Shelenkov	Satrap	Soviet Union	-129.20
21	Karl Ammitzböll	Kajus	Denmark	-129.20
23	August Lütke-Westhues	Trux von Kamax	United Team of Germany	-129.60
23	Konstantin Venkov	Greibel	Bulgaria	-129.60
25	Brian Herbinson	Tara	Canada	-131.20
26	Nail Gönenli	Temel	Turkey	-133.60
27	Ernie Barker	Dandy	Australia	-134.40
28	Virgil Barbuceanu	Brebenel	Romania	-136.00
29	Giancarlo Gutierrez	Wiston	Italy	-138.80
30	Jim Elder	Colleen	Canada	-141.20
40	Lars Kirkebjerg	Havanna	Denmark	-141.20
32	Gheorghe Langa	Bolero	Romania	-142.40
33	Reijo Kuistila	Lamora	Finland	-142.80
44	Gheorghe Soare	Cabala	Romania	-142.80
35	Fethi Gürcan	Rih	Turkey	-143.20
36	Adriano Capuzzo	Tuft of Heather	Italy	-145.60
37	Genko Rashkov	Euphoria	Bulgaria	-146.00
37	Carlos de la Serna	Fanion	Argentina	-146.00
39	Joaquim Silva	Heléboro	Portugal	-149.20
40	Juan Martín-Merbilháa	Gitana I	Argentina	-150.00
40	Samuel Koechlin	Goya	Switzerland	-150.00
42	Fernando Cavaleiro	Marte	Portugal	-152.00
43	Eduardo Cano	Why	Argentina	-152.80
43	Kaarlo Anttinen	Locarno	Finland	-152.80
45	Harry Freeman-Jackson	Cellarstown	Ireland	-153.20
46	Bunty Thompson	Brown Sugar	Australia	-154.40
47	Jack Burton	Huntingfield	United States	-155.60
48	Ian Hume-Dudgeon	Copper Coin	Ireland	-158.00
49	Joaquín Nogueras	Thalia	Spain	-161.60
50	Frank Duffy	Drop Dead	United States	-162.40
51	Bill Mullins	Charleville	Ireland	-166.00
52	Kemal Özçelik	Eskimo	Turkey	-166.80
53	Faustino Dominguez	Anfitrion	Spain	-170.80
54	Alvaro Sabbo	Marto	Portugal	-173.20
55	Hernán Espinosa	Al-Herrasan	Spain	-177.60
56	Walter Staley	Mud Dauber	United States	-182.00

=== Standings after cross-country ===
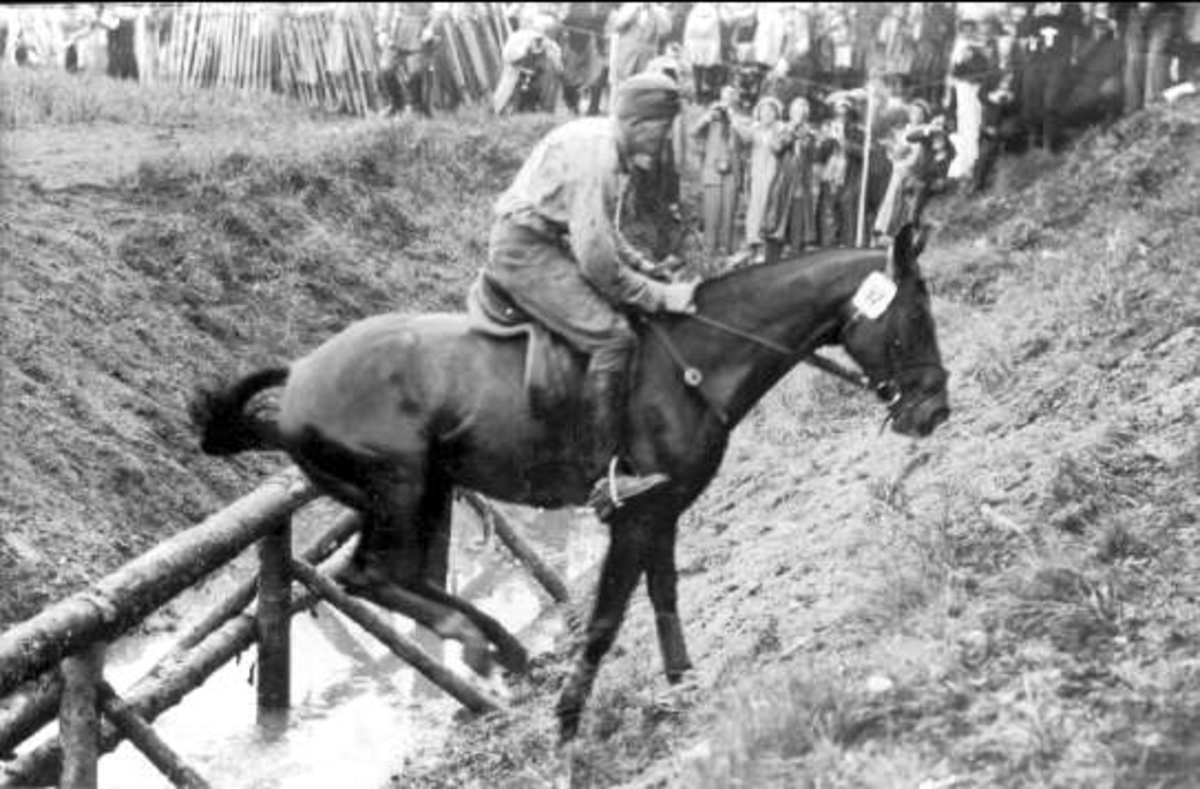
Petrus Kastenman and Iluster tackling the cross-country course

Rank	Rider	Horse	Nation	Dressage	Cross-country							Total
Rank	Rider	Horse	Nation	Dressage	Obstacle faults			Time points			Total	Total
Rank	Rider	Horse	Nation	Dressage	Stage B	Stage D	Total	Stage B	Stage D	Total	Total	Total
1	Petrus Kastenman	Iluster	Sweden	-116.40	0	0	0	30.67	39.20	69.87	69.87	-46.53
2	August Lütke-Westhues	Trux von Kamax	United Team of Germany	-129.60	0	0	0	20.95	43.78	64.73	64.73	-64.87
3	Francis Weldon	Kilbarry	Great Britain	-103.20	0	-20	-20	32.38	25.34	57.72	37.72	-65.48
4	Lev Baklyshkin	Guimnast	Soviet Union	-119.20	0	0	0	6.86	35.69	42.55	42.55	-76.65
5	Genko Rashkov	Euphoria	Bulgaria	-146.00	0	0	0	14.34	30.43	44.77	44.77	-101.23
6	Arthur Rook	Wild Venture	Great Britain	-101.60	0	-20	-20	16.61	-0.90	15.71	-4.29	-105.89
7	Adriano Capuzzo	Tuft of Heather	Italy	-145.60	0	0	0	27.99	-1.80	26.19	26.19	-119.41
8	Giancarlo Gutierrez	Wiston	Italy	-138.80	0	-20	-20	10.29	22.08	32.37	12.37	-126.43
9	Juan Martín-Merbilháa	Gitana I	Argentina	-150.00	0	-20	-20	11.90	31.64	43.54	23.54	-126.46
10	Walter Staley	Mud Dauber	United States	-182.00	0	0	0	32.99	14.44	47.43	47.43	-134.57
11	Bill Mullins	Charleville	Ireland	-166.00	0	0	0	9.06	21.96	31.02	31.02	-134.98
12	Brian Crago	Radar	Australia	-124.80	0	0	0	4.48	-17.10	-12.62	-12.62	-137.42
13	Bertie Hill	Countryman III	Great Britain	-108.40	0	-80	-80	36.00	12.29	48.29	-31.71	-140.11
14	John Rumble	Cilroy	Canada	-122.80	0	0	0	4.27	-24.00	-19.73	-19.73	-142.53
15	Hans Christian Andersen	Tom	Denmark	-120.40	0	0	0	-4.20	-19.80	-24.00	-24.00	-144.40
16	Bunty Thompson	Brown Sugar	Australia	-154.40	0	0	0	9.13	0.21	9.34	9.34	-145.06
17	Otto Rothe	Sissi	United Team of Germany	-98.40	0	-80	-80	23.33	7.03	30.36	-49.64	-148.04
18	Harry Freeman-Jackson	Cellarstown	Ireland	-153.20	0	-40	-40	24.38	8.01	32.39	-7.61	-160.81
19	Kemal Özçelik	Eskimo	Turkey	-166.80	0	0	0	16.99	-26.40	-9.41	-9.41	-176.21
20	Jim Elder	Colleen	Canada	-141.20	0	-40	-40	11.31	-13.80	-2.49	-42.49	-183.69
21	Brian Herbinson	Tara	Canada	-131.20	0	-20	-20	0.20	-55.50	-55.30	-75.30	-206.50
22	Eduardo Cano	Why	Argentina	-152.80	0	-100	-100	11.31	9.48	20.79	-79.21	-232.01
23	Klaus Wagner	Prinzess	United Team of Germany	-102.40	0	-140	-140	15.70	-6.30	9.40	-130.60	-233.00
24	Hans von Blixen-Finecke Jr.	Jubal	Sweden	-110.40	0	-200	-200	34.46	27.06	61.52	-138.48	-248.88
25	Lars Kirkebjerg	Havanna	Denmark	-141.20	0	-80	-80	3.72	-40.20	-36.48	-116.48	-257.68
26	Nail Gönenli	Temel	Turkey	-133.60	0	-140	-140	26.83	-23.40	3.43	-136.57	-270.17
27	Nikolay Shelenkov	Satrap	Soviet Union	-129.20	0	-140	-140	7.42	-15.90	-8.48	-148.48	-277.68
28	Jean Saint-Fort Paillard	Farceur	France	-125.60	0	-180	-180	36.00	-15.30	20.70	-159.30	-284.90
29	Ernie Barker	Dandy	Australia	-134.40	-60	-80	-140	-13.20	-8.40	-21.60	-161.60	-296.00
30	Gheorghe Soare	Cabala	Romania	-142.80	0	-160	-160	33.16	-38.10	-4.94	-164.94	-307.74
31	Carlos de la Serna	Fanion	Argentina	-146.00	-60	-140	-200	15.39	-5.10	10.29	-189.71	-335.71
32	Milo Gmür	Romeo	Switzerland	-111.20	0	-180	-180	2.49	-49.80	-47.31	-227.31	-338.51
33	Joaquim Silva	Heléboro	Portugal	-149.20	0	-140	-140	19.85	-70.20	-50.35	-190.35	-339.55
34	Roland Perret	Erlfried	Switzerland	-105.60	0	-180	-180	11.02	-90.60	-101.62	-259.58	-365.18
35	Giuseppe Molinari	Uccello	Italy	-124.40	0	-220	-220	4.90	-55.80	-50.90	-270.90	-395.30
36	Jack Burton	Huntingfield	United States	-155.60	0	-120	-120	-8.40	-132.60	-141.00	-261.00	-416.60
37	Alain Bouchet	Ferney	France	-112.40	0	-360	-360	24.95	-22.80	2.15	-357.85	-470.25
38	Konstantin Venkov	Greibel	Bulgaria	-129.60	0	-320	-320	14.42	-95.40	-80.98	-400.98	-530.58
39	Samuel Koechlin	Goya	Switzerland	-150.00	0	-320	-320	2.49	-89.70	-87.21	-407.21	-557.21
40	Fernando Cavaleiro	Marte	Portugal	-152.00	0	-420	-420	1.41	-41.40	-39.99	-459.99	-611.99
41	Valerian Kuybyshev	Perekop	Soviet Union	-110.80	0	-460	-460	11.90	-119.10	-107.20	-567.20	-678.00
42	Reijo Kuistila	Lamora	Finland	-142.80	0	-540	-540	23.58	-279.30	-255.72	-795.72	-938.52
–	Kari Tolvanen	Lariina	Finland	-107.60	Eliminated							
–	Johan Asker	Iller	Sweden	-119.60	Eliminated							
–	Rashko Fratev	Naphtaline	Bulgaria	-126.80	Eliminated							
–	Karl Ammitzböll	Kajus	Denmark	-129.20	Eliminated							
–	Virgil Barbuceanu	Brebenel	Romania	-136.00	Eliminated							
–	Gheorghe Langa	Bolero	Romania	-142.40	Eliminated							
–	Fethi Gürcan	Rih	Turkey	-143.20	Eliminated							
–	Kaarlo Anttinen	Locarno	Finland	-152.80	Eliminated							
–	Ian Hume-Dudgeon	Copper Coin	Ireland	-158.00	Eliminated							
–	Joaquín Nogueras	Thalia	Spain	-161.60	Eliminated							
–	Frank Duffy	Drop Dead	United States	-162.40	Eliminated							
–	Faustino Dominguez	Anfitrion	Spain	-170.80	Eliminated							
–	Alvaro Sabbo	Marto	Portugal	-173.20	Eliminated							
–	Hernán Espinosa	Al-Herrasan	Spain	-177.60	Eliminated							

=== Final results after jumping ===
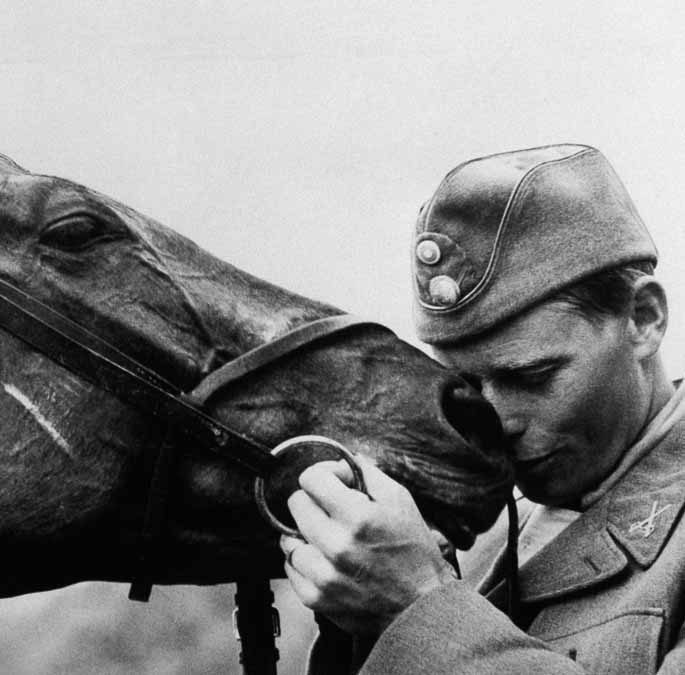
Petrus Kastenman and Iluster took the individual eventing gold medal

Rank	Rider	Horse	Nation	Dressage	Cross-country	Jumping			Total
Rank	Rider	Horse	Nation	Dressage	Cross-country	Points lost			Total
Rank	Rider	Horse	Nation	Dressage	Cross-country	Obstacles	Time	Total	Total
1st place, gold medalist(s)	Petrus Kastenman	Iluster	Sweden	-116.40	69.87	-20	0	-20	-66.53
2nd place, silver medalist(s)	August Lütke-Westhues	Trux von Kamax	United Team of Germany	-129.60	64.73	-20	0	-20	-84.87
3rd place, bronze medalist(s)	Francis Weldon	Kilbarry	Great Britain	-103.20	37.72	-20	0	-20	-85.48
4	Lev Baklyshkin	Guimnast	Soviet Union	-119.20	42.55	-20	0	-20	-96.65
5	Genko Rashkov	Euphoria	Bulgaria	-146.00	44.77	-10	0	-10	-111.23
6	Arthur Rook	Wild Venture	Great Britain	-101.60	-4.29	-10	-3.75	-13.75	-119.64
7	Giancarlo Gutierrez	Wiston	Italy	-138.80	12.37	-10	0	-10	-136.43
8	Juan Martín-Merbilháa	Gitana I	Argentina	-150.00	23.54	-10	0	-10	-136.46
9	Adriano Capuzzo	Tuft of Heather	Italy	-145.60	26.19	-20	0	-20	-139.41
10	Bill Mullins	Charleville	Ireland	-166.00	31.02	-10	-0.5	-10.5	-145.48
11	Brian Crago	Radar	Australia	-124.80	-12.62	-10	0	-10	-147.42
12	Bertie Hill	Countryman III	Great Britain	-108.40	-31.71	-10	-0.25	-10.25	-150.36
13	Hans Christian Andersen	Tom	Denmark	-120.40	-24.00	-10	0	-10	-154.40
14	Bunty Thompson	Brown Sugar	Australia	-154.40	9.34	-10	0	-10	-155.06
15	Otto Rothe	Sissi	United Team of Germany	-98.40	-49.64	-10	0	-10	-158.04
16	John Rumble	Cilroy	Canada	-122.80	-19.73	-20	0	-20	-162.53
17	Harry Freeman-Jackson	Cellarstown	Ireland	-153.20	-7.61	-10	0	-10	-170.81
18	Kemal Özçelik	Eskimo	Turkey	-166.80	-9.41	-10	0	-10	-186.21
19	Jim Elder	Colleen	Canada	-141.20	-42.49	-10	0	-10	-193.69
20	Brian Herbinson	Tara	Canada	-131.20	-75.30	-10	0	-10	-216.50
21	Klaus Wagner	Prinzess	United Team of Germany	-102.40	-130.60	0	0	0	-233.00
22	Eduardo Cano	Why	Argentina	-152.80	-79.21	-10	0	-10	-242.01
23	Lars Kirkebjerg	Havanna	Denmark	-141.20	-116.48	-10	0	-10	-267.68
24	Hans von Blixen-Finecke Jr.	Jubal	Sweden	-110.40	-138.48	-30	-7.5	-37.5	-286.38
25	Jean Saint-Fort Paillard	Farceur	France	-125.60	-159.30	-10	0	-10	-294.90
26	Nikolay Shelenkov	Satrap	Soviet Union	-129.20	-148.48	-20	0	-20	-297.68
27	Ernie Barker	Dandy	Australia	-134.40	-161.60	-20	-1.5	-21.5	-317.50
28	Carlos de la Serna	Fanion	Argentina	-146.00	-189.71	-10	0	-10	-345.71
29	Joaquim Silva	Heléboro	Portugal	-149.20	-190.35	-10	0	-10	-349.55
30	Milo Gmür	Romeo	Switzerland	-111.20	-227.31	-40	0	-40	-378.51
31	Roland Perret	Erlfried	Switzerland	-105.60	-259.58	-40	0	-40	-405.18
32	Giuseppe Molinari	Uccello	Italy	-124.40	-270.90	-20	0	-20	-415.30
33	Samuel Koechlin	Goya	Switzerland	-150.00	-407.21	-20	0	-20	-577.21
34	Fernando Cavaleiro	Marte	Portugal	-152.00	-459.99	-40	-5.25	-45.25	-657.24
35	Valerian Kuybyshev	Perekop	Soviet Union	-110.80	-567.20	-40	0	-40	-718.00
36	Reijo Kuistila	Lamora	Finland	-142.80	-795.72	-10	-2.25	-12.25	-950.77
–	Walter Staley	Mud Dauber	United States	-182.00	47.43	Eliminated			
–	Gheorghe Soare	Cabala	Romania	-142.80	-164.94	Eliminated			
–	Nail Gönenli	Temel	Turkey	-133.60	-136.57	Did not start			Elim.
–	Jack Burton	Huntingfield	United States	-155.60	-261.00	Did not start			Elim.
–	Alain Bouchet	Ferney	France	-112.40	-357.85	Did not start			Elim.
–	Konstantin Venkov	Greibel	Bulgaria	-129.60	-400.98	Did not start			Elim.
–	Kari Tolvanen	Lariina	Finland	-107.60	Eliminated				
–	Johan Asker	Iller	Sweden	-119.60	Eliminated				
–	Rashko Fratev	Naphtaline	Bulgaria	-126.80	Eliminated				
–	Karl Ammitzböll	Kajus	Denmark	-129.20	Eliminated				
–	Virgil Bărbuceanu	Brebenel	Romania	-136.00	Eliminated				
–	Gheorghe Langa	Bolero	Romania	-142.40	Eliminated				
–	Fethi Gürcan	Rih	Turkey	-143.20	Eliminated				
–	Kaarlo Anttinen	Locarno	Finland	-152.80	Eliminated				
–	Ian Hume-Dudgeon	Copper Coin	Ireland	-158.00	Eliminated				
–	Joaquín Nogueras	Thalia	Spain	-161.60	Eliminated				
–	Frank Duffy	Drop Dead	United States	-162.40	Eliminated				
–	Faustino Domínguez	Anfitrion	Spain	-170.80	Eliminated				
–	Alvaro Sabbo	Marto	Portugal	-173.20	Eliminated				
–	Hernán Espinosa	Al-Herrasan	Spain	-177.60	Eliminated				
