= Equestrian at the 1956 Summer Olympics – Team eventing =

Team eventing at the Games of the XVI Olympiad
- Venue: Stockholm Olympic Stadium
- Date: 11–14 June 1956
- Competitors: 54 from 18 nations

Medalists
1st place, gold medalist(s)		Francis Weldon; Arthur Rook; Bertie Hill	Great Britain
2nd place, silver medalist(s)		August Lütke-Westhues; Otto Rothe; Klaus Wagner	United Team of Germany
3rd place, bronze medalist(s)		John Rumble; Jim Elder; Brian Herbinson	Canada

The team eventing at the 1956 Summer Olympics took place between 11 and 14 June, at the Stockholm Olympic Stadium. Eventing was open to men only. It was the 9th appearance of the event.

== Competition format ==
The team and individual eventing competitions used the same results. Eventing consisted of a dressage test, a cross-country test, and a jumping test. The competitor with the best total score (fewest penalty points) won. The individual scores were summed to give a team score.

- Dressage: The eventing competition featured a dressage test. Five judges gave scores.
- Cross-country: The cross-country test had five phases.
  - Phase A: 7.2 km roads. Time allowed was 30 minutes (240 m/min).
  - Phase B: 3.6 km steeplechase. Time allowed was 6 minutes (600 m/min).
  - Phase C: 14.4 km roads. Time allowed was 60 minutes (240 m/min).
  - Phase D: 7.65 km cross-country. Time allowed was 17 minutes (450 m/min). There were 33 obstacles.
  - Phase E: 2 km flat. Time allowed was 6 minutes (333 m/min).
- Jumping: The jumping test had 12 obstacles.

== Results ==
18 teams of 3 (54 riders) competed. France also sent a team, but one of its riders did not begin the eventing competition.

=== Standings after dressage ===
Rank	Nation	Individual results			Team result
Rank	Nation	Rider	Horse	Dressage	Team result
1	Great Britain	Arthur Rook	Wild Venture	-101.60	-313.20
1	Great Britain	Francis Weldon	Kilbarry	-103.20	-313.20
1	Great Britain	Bertie Hill	Countryman III	-108.40	-313.20
2	United Team of Germany	Otto Rothe	Sissi	-98.40	-330.40
2	United Team of Germany	Klaus Wagner	Prinzess	-102.40	-330.40
2	United Team of Germany	August Lütke-Westhues	Trux von Kamax	-129.60	-330.40
3	Sweden	Hans von Blixen-Finecke Jr.	Jubal	-110.40	-346.40
3	Sweden	Petrus Kastenman	Iluster	-116.40	-346.40
3	Sweden	Johan Asker	Iller	-119.60	-346.40
4	Soviet Union	Valerian Kuybyshev	Perekop	-110.80	-359.20
4	Soviet Union	Lev Baklyshkin	Guimnast	-119.20	-359.20
4	Soviet Union	Nikolay Shelenkov	Satrap	-129.20	-359.20
5	Switzerland	Roland Perret	Erlfried	-105.60	-366.80
5	Switzerland	Milo Gmür	Romeo	-111.20	-366.80
5	Switzerland	Samuel Koechlin	Goya	-150.00	-366.80
6	Denmark	Hans Christian Andersen	Tom	-120.40	-390.80
6	Denmark	Karl Ammitzböll	Kajus	-129.20	-390.80
6	Denmark	Lars Kirkebjerg	Havanna	-141.20	-390.80
7	Canada	John Rumble	Cilroy	-122.80	-395.20
7	Canada	Brian Herbinson	Tara	-131.20	-395.20
7	Canada	Jim Elder	Colleen	-141.20	-395.20
8	Bulgaria	Rashko Fratev	Naphtaline	-126.80	-402.40
8	Bulgaria	Konstantin Venkov	Greibel	-129.60	-402.40
8	Bulgaria	Genko Rashkov	Euphoria	-146.00	-402.40
9	Finland	Kari Tolvanen	Lariina	-107.60	-403.20
9	Finland	Reijo Kuistila	Lamora	-142.80	-403.20
9	Finland	Kaarlo Anttinen	Locarno	-152.80	-403.20
10	Italy	Giuseppe Molinari	Uccello	-124.40	-408.80
10	Italy	Giancarlo Gutierrez	Wiston	-138.80	-408.80
10	Italy	Adriano Capuzzo	Tuft of Heather	-145.60	-408.80
11	Australia	Brian Crago	Radar	-124.80	-413.60
11	Australia	Ernie Barker	Dandy	-134.40	-413.60
11	Australia	Bunty Thompson	Brown Sugar	-154.40	-413.60
12	Romania	Virgil Barbuceanu	Brebenel	-136.00	-421.20
12	Romania	Gheorghe Langa	Bolero	-142.40	-421.20
12	Romania	Gheorghe Soare	Cabala	-142.80	-421.20
13	Turkey	Nail Gönenli	Temel	-133.60	-443.60
13	Turkey	Fethi Gürcan	Rih	-143.20	-443.60
13	Turkey	Kemal Özçelik	Eskimo	-166.80	-443.60
14	Argentina	Carlos de la Serna	Fanion	-146.00	-448.80
14	Argentina	Juan Martín-Merbilháa	Gitana I	-150.00	-448.80
14	Argentina	Eduardo Cano	Why	-152.80	-448.80
15	Portugal	Joaquim Silva	Heléboro	-149.20	-474.40
15	Portugal	Fernando Cavaleiro	Marte	-152.00	-474.40
15	Portugal	Alvaro Sabbo	Marto	-173.20	-474.40
16	Ireland	Harry Freeman-Jackson	Cellarstown	-153.20	-477.20
16	Ireland	Ian Hume-Dudgeon	Copper Coin	-158.00	-477.20
16	Ireland	Bill Mullins	Charleville	-166.00	-477.20
17	United States	Jack Burton	Huntingfield	-155.60	-500.00
17	United States	Frank Duffy	Drop Dead	-162.40	-500.00
17	United States	Walter Staley	Mud Dauber	-182.00	-500.00
18	Spain	Joaquín Nogueras	Thalia	-161.60	-510.00
18	Spain	Faustino Dominguez	Anfitrion	-170.80	-510.00
18	Spain	Hernán Espinosa	Al-Herrasan	-177.60	-510.00

=== Standings after cross-country ===
Rank	Nation	Individual results					Team result
Rank	Nation	Rider	Horse	Dressage	Cross-country	Total	Team result
1	Great Britain	Francis Weldon	Kilbarry	-103.20	37.72	-65.48	-311.48
1	Great Britain	Arthur Rook	Wild Venture	-101.60	-4.29	-105.89	-311.48
1	Great Britain	Bertie Hill	Countryman III	-108.40	-31.71	-140.11	-311.48
2	United Team of Germany	August Lütke-Westhues	Trux von Kamax	-129.60	64.73	-64.87	-445.91
2	United Team of Germany	Otto Rothe	Sissi	-098.40	-49.64	-148.04	-445.91
2	United Team of Germany	Klaus Wagner	Prinzess	-102.40	-130.60	-233.00	-445.91
3	Canada	John Rumble	Cilroy	-122.80	-19.73	-142.53	-532.72
3	Canada	Jim Elder	Colleen	-141.20	-42.49	-183.69	-532.72
3	Canada	Brian Herbinson	Tara	-131.20	-75.30	-206.50	-532.72
4	Australia	Brian Crago	Radar	-124.80	-12.62	-137.42	-578.48
4	Australia	Bunty Thompson	Brown Sugar	-154.40	9.34	-145.06	-578.48
4	Australia	Ernie Barker	Dand	-134.40	-161.60	-296.00	-578.48
5	Italy	Adriano Capuzzo	Tuft of Heather	-145.60	26.19	-119.41	-641.14
5	Italy	Giancarlo Gutierrez	Wiston	-138.80	12.37	-126.43	-641.14
5	Italy	Giuseppe Molinari	Uccello	-124.40	-270.90	-395.30	-641.14
6	Argentina	Juan Martín-Merbilháa	Gitana I	-150.00	23.54	-126.46	-694.18
6	Argentina	Eduardo Cano	Why	-152.80	-79.21	-232.01	-694.18
6	Argentina	Carlos de la Serna	Fanion	-146.00	189.71	-335.71	-694.18
7	Soviet Union	Lev Baklyshkin	Guimnast	-119.20	42.55	-76.65	-1032.33
7	Soviet Union	Nikolay Shelenkov	Satrap	-129.20	-148.48	-277.68	-1032.33
7	Soviet Union	Valerian Kuybyshev	Perekop	-110.80	-567.20	-678.00	-1032.33
8	Switzerland	Milo Gmür	Romeo	-111.20	-227.31	-338.51	-1260.90
8	Switzerland	Roland Perret	Erlfried	-105.60	-259.58	-365.18	-1260.90
8	Switzerland	Samuel Koechlin	Goya	-150.00	-407.21	-557.21	-1260.90
–	Sweden	Petrus Kastenman	Iluster	-116.40	69.87	-46.53	Eliminated
–	Sweden	Hans von Blixen-Finecke Jr.	Jubal	-110.40	-138.48	-248.88	Eliminated
–	Sweden	Johan Asker	Iller	-119.60	Eliminated		Eliminated
–	Ireland	Bill Mullins	Charleville	-166.00	31.02	-134.98	Eliminated
–	Ireland	Harry Freeman-Jackson	Cellarstown	-153.20	-7.61	-160.81	Eliminated
–	Ireland	Ian Hume-Dudgeon	Copper Coin	-158.00	Eliminated		Eliminated
–	Denmark	Hans Christian Andersen	Tom	-120.40	-24.00	-144.40	Eliminated
–	Denmark	Lars Kirkebjerg	Havanna	-141.20	-116.48	-257.68	Eliminated
–	Denmark	Karl Ammitzböll	Kajus	-129.20	Eliminated		Eliminated
–	Turkey	Kemal Özçelik	Eskimo	-166.80	-9.41	-176.21	Eliminated
–	Turkey	Nail Gönenli	Temel	-133.60	-136.57	-270.17	Eliminated
–	Turkey	Fethi Gürcan	Rih	-143.20	Eliminated		Eliminated
–	United States	Walter Staley	Mud Dauber	-182.00	47.43	-134.57	Eliminated
–	United States	Jack Burton	Huntingfield	-155.60	-261.00	-416.60	Eliminated
–	United States	Frank Duffy	Drop Dead	-162.40	Eliminated		Eliminated
–	Bulgaria	Genko Rashkov	Euphoria	-146.00	44.77	-101.23	Eliminated
–	Bulgaria	Konstantin Venkov	Greibel	-129.60	-400.98	-530.58	Eliminated
–	Bulgaria	Rashko Fratev	Naphtaline	-126.80	Eliminated		Eliminated
–	Portugal	Joaquim Silva	Heléboro	-149.20	-190.35	-339.55	Eliminated
–	Portugal	Fernando Cavaleiro	Marte	-152.00	-459.99	-611.99	Eliminated
–	Portugal	Alvaro Sabbo	Marto	-173.20	Eliminated		Eliminated
–	Romania	Gheorghe Soare	Cabala	-142.80	-164.94	-307.74	Eliminated
–	Romania	Virgil Barbuceanu	Brebenel	-136.00	Eliminated		Eliminated
–	Romania	Gheorghe Langa	Bolero	-142.40	Eliminated		Eliminated
–	Finland	Reijo Kuistila	Lamora	-142.80	-795.72	-938.52	Eliminated
–	Finland	Kari Tolvanen	Lariina	-107.60	Eliminated		Eliminated
–	Finland	Kaarlo Anttinen	Locarno	-152.80	Eliminated		Eliminated
–	Spain	Joaquín Nogueras	Thalia	-161.60	Eliminated		Eliminated
–	Spain	Faustino Dominguez	Anfitrion	-170.80	Eliminated		Eliminated
–	Spain	Hernán Espinosa	Al-Herrasan	-177.60	Eliminated		Eliminated

=== Final results after jumping ===
Rank	Nation	Individual results						Team result
Rank	Nation	Rider	Horse	Dressage	Cross-country	Jumping	Total	Team result
1st place, gold medalist(s)	Great Britain	Francis Weldon	Kilbarry	-103.20	37.72	-20	-85.48	-355.48
1st place, gold medalist(s)	Great Britain	Arthur Rook	Wild Venture	-101.60	-4.29	-13.75	-119.64	-355.48
1st place, gold medalist(s)	Great Britain	Bertie Hill	Countryman III	-108.40	-31.71	-10.25	-150.36	-355.48
2nd place, silver medalist(s)	United Team of Germany	August Lütke-Westhues	Trux von Kamax	-129.60	64.73	-20	-84.87	-475.91
2nd place, silver medalist(s)	United Team of Germany	Otto Rothe	Sissi	-98.40	-49.64	-10	-158.04	-475.91
2nd place, silver medalist(s)	United Team of Germany	Klaus Wagner	Prinzess	-102.40	-130.60	0	-233.00	-475.91
3rd place, bronze medalist(s)	Canada	John Rumble	Cilroy	-122.80	-19.73	-20	-162.53	-572.72
3rd place, bronze medalist(s)	Canada	Jim Elder	Colleen	-141.20	-42.49	-10	-193.69	-572.72
3rd place, bronze medalist(s)	Canada	Brian Herbinson	Tara	-131.20	-75.30	-10	-216.50	-572.72
4	Australia	Brian Crago	Radar	-124.80	-12.62	-10	-147.42	-619.98
4	Australia	Bunty Thompson	Brown Sugar	-154.40	9.34	-10	-155.06	-619.98
4	Australia	Ernie Barker	Dandy	-134.40	-161.60	-21.5	-317.50	-619.98
5	Italy	Giancarlo Gutierrez	Wiston	-138.80	12.37	-10	-136.43	-691.14
5	Italy	Adriano Capuzzo	Tuft of Heather	-145.60	26.19	-20	-139.41	-691.14
5	Italy	Giuseppe Molinari	Uccello	-124.40	-270.90	-20	-415.30	-691.14
6	Argentina	Juan Martín-Merbilháa	Gitana I	-150.00	23.54	-10	-136.46	-724.18
6	Argentina	Eduardo Cano	Why	-152.80	-79.21	-10	-242.01	-724.18
6	Argentina	Carlos de la Serna	Fanion	-146.00	-189.71	-10	-345.71	-724.18
7	Soviet Union	Lev Baklyshkin	Guimnast	-119.20	42.55	-20	-96.65	-1112.33
7	Soviet Union	Nikolay Shelenkov	Satrap	-129.20	-148.48	-20	-297.68	-1112.33
7	Soviet Union	Valerian Kuybyshev	Perekop	-110.80	-567.20	-40	-718.00	-1112.33
8	Switzerland	Milo Gmür	Romeo	-111.20	-227.31	-40	-378.51	-1360.90
8	Switzerland	Roland Perret	Erlfried	-105.60	-259.58	-40	-405.18	-1360.90
8	Switzerland	Samuel Koechlin	Goya	-150.00	-407.21	-20	-577.21	-1360.90
–	Sweden	Petrus Kastenman	Iluster	-116.40	69.87	-20	-66.53	Eliminated
–	Sweden	Hans von Blixen-Finecke Jr.	Jubal	-110.40	-138.48	-37.5	-286.38	Eliminated
–	Sweden	Johan Asker	Iller	-119.60	Eliminated			Eliminated
–	Ireland	Bill Mullins	Charleville	-166.00	31.02	-10.5	-145.48	Eliminated
–	Ireland	Harry Freeman-Jackson	Cellarstown	-153.20	-7.61	-10	-170.81	Eliminated
–	Ireland	Ian Hume-Dudgeon	Copper Coin	-158.00	Eliminated			Eliminated
–	Denmark	Hans Christian Andersen	Tom	-120.40	-24.00	-10	-154.40	Eliminated
–	Denmark	Lars Kirkebjerg	Havanna	-141.20	-116.48	-10	-267.68	Eliminated
–	Denmark	Karl Ammitzböll	Kajus	-129.20	Eliminated			Eliminated
–	Portugal	Joaquim Silva	Heléboro	-149.20	-190.35	-10	-349.55	Eliminated
–	Portugal	Fernando Cavaleiro	Marte	-152.00	-459.99	-45.25	-657.24	Eliminated
–	Portugal	Alvaro Sabbo	Marto	-173.20	Eliminated			Eliminated
–	Turkey	Kemal Özçelik	Eskimo	-166.80	-9.41	-10	-186.21	Eliminated
–	Turkey	Nail Gönenli	Temel	-133.60	-136.57	Did not start		Eliminated
–	Turkey	Fethi Gürcan	Rih	-143.20	Eliminated			Eliminated
–	Bulgaria	Genko Rashkov	Euphoria	-146.00	44.77	-10	-111.23	Eliminated
–	Bulgaria	Konstantin Venkov	Greibel	-129.60	-400.98	Did not start		Eliminated
–	Bulgaria	Rashko Fratev	Naphtaline	-126.80	Eliminated			Eliminated
–	Finland	Reijo Kuistila	Lamora	-142.80	-795.72	-12.25	-950.77	Eliminated
–	Finland	Kari Tolvanen	Lariina	-107.60	Eliminated			Eliminated
–	Finland	Kaarlo Anttinen	Locarno	-152.80	Eliminated			Eliminated
–	United States	Walter Staley	Mud Dauber	-182.00	47.43	Eliminated		Eliminated
–	United States	Jack Burton	Huntingfield	-155.60	-261.00	Did not start		Eliminated
–	United States	Frank Duffy	Drop Dead	-162.40	Eliminated			Eliminated
–	Romania	Gheorghe Soare	Cabala	-142.80	-164.94	Eliminated		Eliminated
–	Romania	Virgil Barbuceanu	Brebenel	-136.00	Eliminated			Eliminated
–	Romania	Gheorghe Langa	Bolero	-142.40	Eliminated			Eliminated
–	Spain	Joaquín Nogueras	Thalia	-161.60	Eliminated			Eliminated
–	Spain	Faustino Dominguez	Anfitrion	-170.80	Eliminated			Eliminated
–	Spain	Hernán Espinosa	Al-Herrasan	-177.60	Eliminated			Eliminated
