= Switzerland at the 1956 Summer Olympics =

- IOC code: SUI
- NOC: Swiss Olympic Association

in Melbourne/Stockholm
- Medals Ranked 35th: Gold 0 Silver 0 Bronze 1 Total 1

Summer Olympics appearances (overview)
- 1896; 1900; 1904; 1908; 1912; 1920; 1924; 1928; 1932; 1936; 1948; 1952; 1956; 1960; 1964; 1968; 1972; 1976; 1980; 1984; 1988; 1992; 1996; 2000; 2004; 2008; 2012; 2016; 2020; 2024

Other related appearances
- 1906 Intercalated Games

Switzerland boycotted the 1956 Summer Olympics in Melbourne, Australia because of the participation of the Soviet Union, who had invaded Hungary to crush the Hungarian Revolution of 1956. However, the equestrian events were held in Stockholm, Sweden earlier in the year because of the Australian quarantine laws. The Swiss team competed in Stockholm, winning a bronze medal.

== Equestrian ==
=== Dressage ===
Athlete	Horse	Event	Judges scores		Overall	
Athlete	Horse	Event	Score	Rank	Overall score	Rank
Gottfried Trachsel	Kursus	Individual	166.0	6	807.00	6
Henri Chammartin	Wöhler	Individual	179.0	2	789.00	8
Gustav Fischer	Vasello	Individual	160.0	9	750.00	10
Gottfried Trachsel; Henri Chammartin; Gustav Fischer	See above	Team	—N/a		2,346.00	3rd place, bronze medalist(s)

=== Eventing ===
Athlete	Horse	Event	Dressage		Cross-country			Jumping			Total	
Athlete	Horse	Event	Dressage		Cross-country			Final			Total	
Athlete	Horse	Event	Penalties	Rank	Penalties	Total	Rank	Penalties	Total	Rank	Penalties	Rank
Emil-Otto Gmür	Romeo	Individual	111.20	10	227.31	338.51	32	40.00	378.51	30	378.51	30
Roland Perret	Erlfried	Individual	105.60	5	259.58	365.18	34	40.00	405.18	31	405.18	31
Samuel Köchlin	Goya	Individual	150.00	40	407.21	557.21	39	20.00	577.21	33	577.21	33
Emil-Otto Gmür; Roland Perret; Samuel Köchlin	See above	Team	366.80	5	894.10	1,260.90	8	100.00	1,360.90	8	1,360.90	8

=== Show jumping ===
Athlete	Horse	Event	Round 1		Round 2		Final	
Athlete	Horse	Event	Penalties	Rank	Penalties	Rank	Penalties	Rank
William de Rham	Va Vite	Individual	20.00	20	16.00	18	36.00	19
Marc Büchler	Duroc	Individual	28.50	33	36.00	39	64.50	37
Alexander Stoffel	Bricole	Individual	27.00	30	32.00	33	59.00	34
William de Rham; Alexander Stoffel; Marc Büchler	See above	Team	75.50	8	84.00	9	159.50	9
