= Spain at the 1956 Summer Olympics =

- IOC code: ESP (SPA used at these Games)
- NOC: Spanish Olympic Committee

in Melbourne/Stockholm
- Competitors: 6 in 1 sport
- Medals: Gold 0 Silver 0 Bronze 0 Total 0

Summer Olympics appearances (overview)
- 1900; 1904–1912; 1920; 1924; 1928; 1932; 1936; 1948; 1952; 1956; 1960; 1964; 1968; 1972; 1976; 1980; 1984; 1988; 1992; 1996; 2000; 2004; 2008; 2012; 2016; 2020; 2024; 2028

Spain boycotted the 1956 Summer Olympics in Melbourne, Australia because of the participation of the Soviet Union, who invaded Hungary during the USSR's invasion of Hungary. However, the equestrian events for the 1956 Games were held in Stockholm, Sweden five months earlier (because of Australian quarantine regulations), and six Spanish riders competed.

== Equestrian ==
=== Eventing ===
Athlete	Horse	Event	Dressage		Cross-country			Jumping			Total	
Athlete	Horse	Event	Dressage		Cross-country			Final			Total	
Athlete	Horse	Event	Penalties	Rank	Penalties	Total	Rank	Penalties	Total	Rank	Penalties	Rank
Faustino Domínguez	Anfitrion	Individual	170.80	53	DNF			DNS			DNF	
Joaquín Nogueras	Thalia	Individual	161.60	49	DNF			DNS			DNF	
Hernán Espinosa	Al-Herrasan	Individual	177.60	55	DNF			DNS			DNF	
Faustino Domínguez; Joaquín Nogueras; Hernán Espinosa	See above	Team	510.00	18	DNF			DNS			DNF	

=== Show jumping ===
Athlete	Horse	Event	Round 1		Round 2		Final	
Athlete	Horse	Event	Penalties	Rank	Penalties	Rank	Penalties	Rank
Carlos López	Tapatio	Individual	27.00	30	0.75	3	27.75	14
Paco Goyoaga	Fahnenkönig	Individual	20.00	20	8.00	10	28.00	15
Carlos Figueroa	Gracieux	Individual	33.50	40	28.00	30	61.50	36
Carlos López; Paco Goyoaga; Carlos Figueroa	See above	Team	80.50	9	36.75	4	117.25	6
