= Pat Smythe =

British equestrian (1928–1996)

Pat Smythe OBE
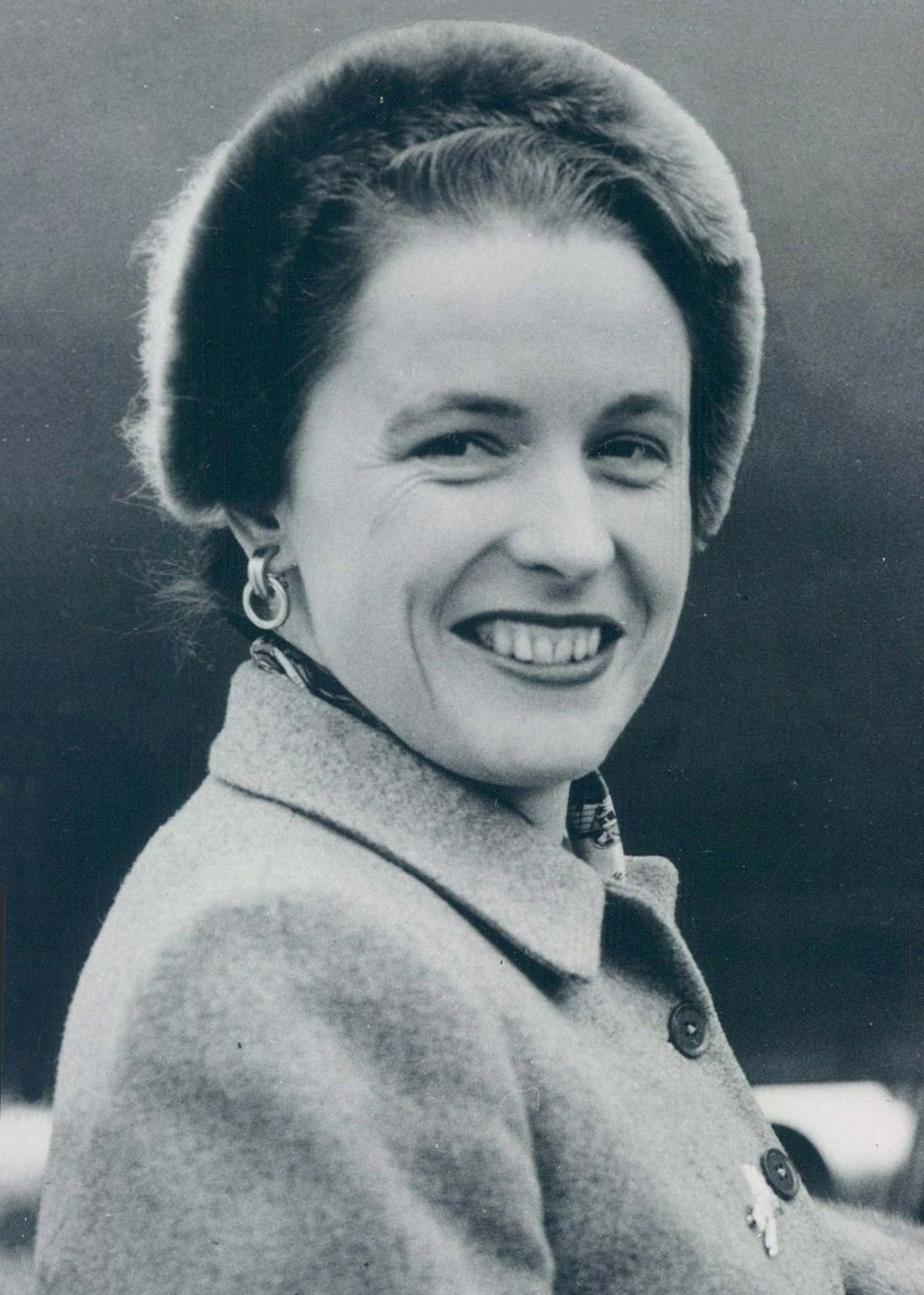
- Smythe in 1954

Personal information
- Born: 22 November 1928 East Sheen, London, UK
- Died: 27 February 1996 (aged 67) Miserden, Gloucestershire, England
- Height: 170 cm (5 ft 7 in)
- Weight: 67 kg (148 lb)

Sport
- Sport: Equestrian
Medal record
Representing United Kingdom
Olympic Games
Bronze medal – third place	1956 Stockholm	Jumping team

Patricia Rosemary "Pat" Smythe, OBE (22 November 1928 – 27 February 1996) was a British show jumper. She competed at the 1956 and 1960 Summer Olympics, winning a team bronze medal in 1956. She served as president of the British Show Jumping Association in 1983–86 and as vice-president from 1987 to 1996. She also wrote many books on equestrian themes, largely for children.

== Early years ==
Pat Smythe was the last of three children, the other two being Dicky and Ronald Smythe. Dicky died from pneumonia at the age of four. Her parents were Eric Hamilton Smythe and Frances Monica Curtoys, who were born in the early 1900s. She was born in East Sheen and at the age of 10 moved to the Cotswolds. Later she was a boarder at Talbot Heath School in Bournemouth.

Pat nearly died from diphtheria when she was five. Although she recovered fully she had to learn to walk again. Hardship and suffering were to feature predominantly throughout her professional and personal life. Her father died of ill health when she was in her late teens and her mother was killed in a car crash when she was 23.

== War years ==
World War II brought times of separation for the family. In early 1940 her father was sent to Biskra in Algeria to heal his arthritis. Her mother remained in London working for the Red Cross. During her father's return from North Africa via France, her mother set out to find him. They met in Aix-les-Bains and escaped from France under enemy fire on the very last boat leaving Bordeaux just before the Germans occupied the city.

Pat was sent to the Cotswolds for her safety, along with her pony, Pixie. Her brother had been evacuated to Newquay, in Cornwall, where his school had relocated. It was during that time, while getting into an entanglement with several horses, that Pat met the King in the middle of the road. Unaware of who he was, she said to the driver of the car he was travelling in Shut up! Can't you see I'm trying to get these horses out of the road!

In early 1941 Pat and her parents moved to a house in the Cotswolds. Her parents had to work hard and their house was turned into a guesthouse. In 1949, after her father's death, Pat and her mother moved again, to Miserden, in the Cotswolds.

== Ponies and horses ==
Smythe's first ride was on a small pony known as Bubbles. Although he was her brother's pony she learned to ride on him but outgrew him eventually. After that her parents bought her a Dartmoor/Arab-cross pony named Pixie. Pat competed on Pixie at local shows, even after Pixie was blinded in one eye in an accident. Pixie was later mated and gave birth to a filly, who was named Vicky.

Pat's mother used to be sent polo ponies by a friend of the family, Johnny Traill, to break and be schooled for polo playing. Although they were not hers, when she was older Pat also helped school and break them.

It was not until Pat's move to the Cotswolds that her first taste of showjumping came with Finality. After varied success at gymkhanas and the numerous injuries Finality suffered, Pat was able to compete in her first International Show. Eventually she was asked to join the British team with Colonel Harry Llewellyn, Ruby Holland-Martin, Toby Robeson and Brian Butler in 1947. But the partnership with Finality was not to last. She had been lent to the family by Johnny Traill and, owing to financial pressure, had to be sold.

Pat's next horse was the grey mare Carmena. Although Carmena was a talented and successful horse, Pat admitted that she could never feel the same closeness she had had with Finality.

Shortly after Carmena came another mare, Leona. Leona served Pat well until the death of her mother meant that finances became tight. Being the most valuable horse (at the time), Leona had to be sold.

In 1949 Pat acquired her cheapest horse, Prince Hal. Bought as an ex-racehorse, he was initially named Fourtowns.

Tosca was Pat's next purchase. She had been born in 1945. It was her most successful partnership after Finality, with them winning many medals and major showjumping prizes of the day. Tosca was one of the horses she most often competed with abroad. After Tosca's retirement from showjumping in the mid-1950s she bred several foals, including Lucia (by Gay Scot, born 1957), Favourita (by Blue Duster, born 1958), Flamenca (by Tambourin, born 1959), Laurella (by Schapiro, born 1960), Prince Igor (by Shapiro, born 1961), Chocolate Soldier (her sixth, by either Bitter Sweet or Cortachy, born 1962), Melba (by Pincola, born 1963), Sir John (by Shapiro, born 1964) and a final foal (name unknown, by Three Card Trick). It may be that after 1965 she produced several more foals.

Lucia produced a few foals, including Titania (by Schapiro, born 1962), Caruso (by Pinicola, born 1963) and Queen of Hearts (by Three Card Trick, born 1965).

Later showjumpers included Flanagan (on which she won the bronze medal in the Team Jumping event at the 1956 Olympic games in Stockholm), Brigadoon, Scorchin, Mr Pollard, Ocean Foam and Telebrae.

In 1963 she married her childhood friend Sam Koechlin, a Swiss lawyer, businessman and Olympic equestrian, and became Patricia Koechlin-Smythe. This meant a move to Switzerland and it was there that many of her books, including several pony books for children, were written. She accompanied Sam on business trips all around the world until he died in 1985, whereupon she moved back to the Cotswolds.

They had two daughters. Smythe died from a heart disease aged 67.

== Books ==
Smythe was a prolific writer and by the age of 30 had published 11 books.

=== Biographies ===
- Flanagan My Friend
- Joies du jumping (Jump for joy). Éditions Corrêa. 1955.
  - English version Jump for Joy: Pat Smythe's Story. E. P. Dutton, New York (1955)
- Jumping Around the World
- Leaping Life's Fences
- One Jump Ahead. Cassell. 1956.
- Tosca and Lucia
- Florian's Farmyard

=== Nonfiction ===
- A Pony for Pleasure. Stephen Greene Press. 1970. ISBN 978-0-8289-0108-6.
- Bred to Jump
- Horses And Places
- Pat Smythe's Book of Horses. Cassell. 1955.
- Pony Problems. S. Greene Press. 1971. ISBN 978-0-8289-0131-4.
- Show Jumping. A. S. Barnes. 1968.

=== Fiction ===
==== Three Jays series ====
- Jacqueline Rides for a Fall. Cassell. 1957.
- Three Jays Against The Clock (Cassel, 1958)
- Three Jays on Holiday (Cassel, 1958)
- Three Jays Go To Town (Cassel, 1959)
- Three Jays Over The Border (Cassel, 1960)
- Three Jays Go To Rome (Cassel, 1960)
- Three Jays Lend A Hand (Cassel, 1961)

==== Adventure series ====
- A Swiss Adventure (Cassell, 1970) ISBN 9780304936762
- A Spanish Adventure (Cassell, 1971) ISBN 9780304938483
- A Cotswold Adventure (Cassell, 1973) ISBN 978-0304291878
