= Arthur Rook =

Arthur Rook may refer to:

- Arthur Rook (equestrian) (1921–1989), English equestrian and Olympic champion
- Arthur Rook (dermatologist) (1918–1991), British dermatologist and author

== See also ==
- Arthur Rooke (fl. 1910s–1920s), British actor and film director
