= Capuzzo =

Capuzzo is an Italian surname. Notable people with the surname include:

- Adriano Capuzzo (1927–2011), Italian equestrian
- Michael Capuzzo (born 1957), American journalist and writer
- Oreste Capuzzo (1908–1985), Italian gymnast

== See also ==
- Fort Capuzzo, a World War II fort in Italian Libya
