= Kirkebjerg =

Kirkebjerg is a surname of Danish origin meaning "church mountain".

Notable people with the surname include:

- Frode Kirkebjerg (1888–1975), Danish Olympian equestrian
- Lars Kirkebjerg (1922–2000), Danish Olympian equestrian
