= Francis Duffy =

Francis or Frank Duffy may refer to:

- Francis Duffy (bishop) (born 1958), Roman Catholic Bishop of Ardagh and Clonmacnoise
- Francis Clyde Duffy (1890–1977), Lieutenant Governor of North Dakota
- Francis Noel Duffy (born 1971), Irish Green Party politician for Dublin South-West
- Francis P. Duffy (1871–1932), Roman Catholic priest in the U.S.
- Frank Duffy (architect) (1940–2026), British architect
- Frank Duffy (baseball) (born 1946), Major League Baseball player
- Frank Duffy (curler) (1959–2010), Scottish wheelchair curler
- Frank Duffy (equestrian) (born 1937), American equestrian
- Frank Duffy (labor leader) (1861–1955), American labor leader and secretary-general
- Sir Frank Gavan Duffy (1852–1936), Australian judge

== See also ==
- F. Ryan Duffy (1888–1979), U.S. Senator from Wisconsin
