= Canadian Equestrian Team =

Athletes representing Canada in international equestrian competition

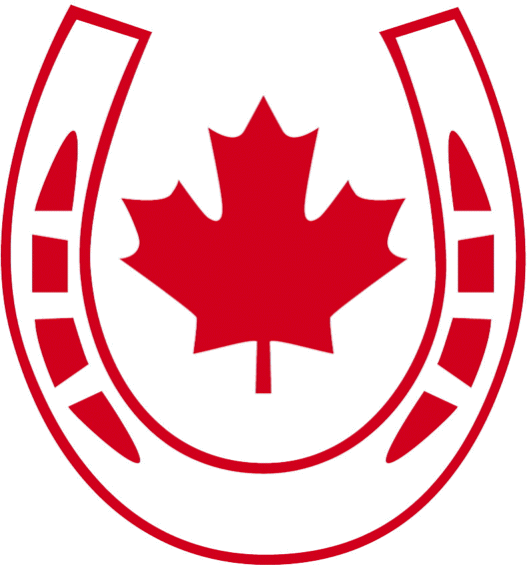
- The 1948 Mann Logo
- Founded: 1840
- Colours: Red and White

The Canadian Equestrian Team or CET (French: Équipe équestre canadienne or EEC) collectively describes the athletes that represent Canada at the highest levels of international equestrian competition, specifically at the World Championship, Olympic, and Paralympic levels.

There many different equestrian disciplines, with separate and overlapping international governing bodies, responsible for different international championship series. Because of this, the term Canadian Equestrian Team has been used by many equestrian sport organizations since 1840 to describe their most senior teams competing for Canada internationally in a variety of disciplines and in a variety of systems.

When greater precision is needed, a specific team is referred to by its discipline or by the event at which it competes: e.g., the athletes riding for Canada in jumping at the Olympic Games are referred to variously as the "Canadian Equestrian Team", the "Canadian Jumping Team", the "Canadian Olympic Equestrian Team", and the "Canadian Olympic Jumping Team".

== History ==
=== Origins ===
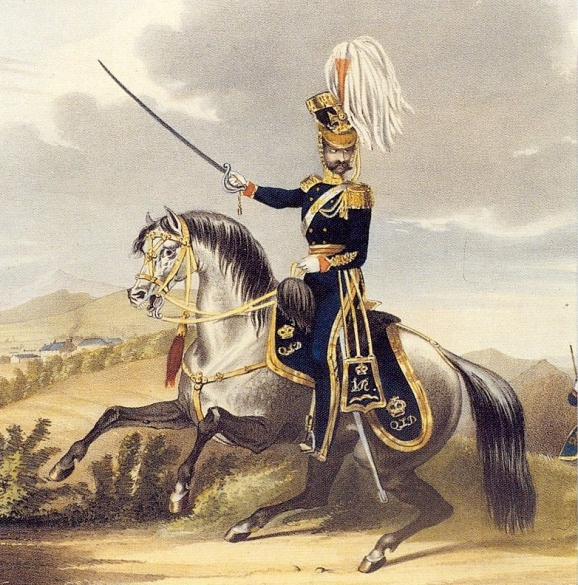
An officer of the Queen's Light Dragoons, during the period of Capt Walter Jones

The earliest recorded Canadian Equestrian Team competed at the 1840 Montreal Steeplechase, the first international steeplechase competition in North America. Captain Thomas Walter Jones of the Queen's Light Dragoons was the sole CET rider, and represented The Canadas against riders from British regiments. The event was won by Colonel Whyte of Britain's 7th Hussars.

Canada's first national equestrian championship, the "Dominion Equestrian Championship", was held in 1895 in Toronto, in the disciplines of steeplechase, hunt seat equitation, and jumping, with entries from both men and women. Although the victors were the first group of athletes to be described as the Canadian Equestrian Team, they did not go on to compete together internationally.

=== Military Age ===
In the first half of the twentieth century, international equestrian sport was dominated by military riders. In Canada, the Canadian Militia was recognized by the federal government as the country's first national equestrian federation, and began the process of building the first institutional CET.

The first CET that was organized as a formal multi-athlete team to compete together at an international event, was a group of jumpers, selected by the Canadian Militia for the 1909 Military Tournament at the Olympia London International Horse Show. The riders were: Lt Wood Leonard (London Field Battery); Lt Frank Proctor (Governor General's Body Guard); and Capt Douglas Young (Royal Canadian Dragoons). They finished in fourth place. This team was, however, considered a representative of the Canadian military and not of Canada itself, because it competed only against other military teams.

The first group of athletes who were regarded as representatives of all Canadian equestrians (both civilian and military) and who competed together against other national equestrian teams, was selected by the Canadian Militia to compete in Prix des Nations jumping at the 1926 Royal Agricultural Winter Fair in Toronto. The team was composed of Maj R S Timmis, Lt Elliott, and Capt Stuart Bate. All three riders were from the Royal Canadian Dragoons, the only Canadian cavalry regiment to retain horses after the First World War. The team won first place, defeating national teams from Belgium, Britain, France, and the United States.

The team went on to compete successfully against other international opponents in New York, Boston, and London.

=== Growth ===
After the end of the Second World War, the Canadian Army began phasing out its financial support for equestrian sport. Today, the Canadian Armed Forces exercises responsibility for the CET only at the CISM Military World Games.

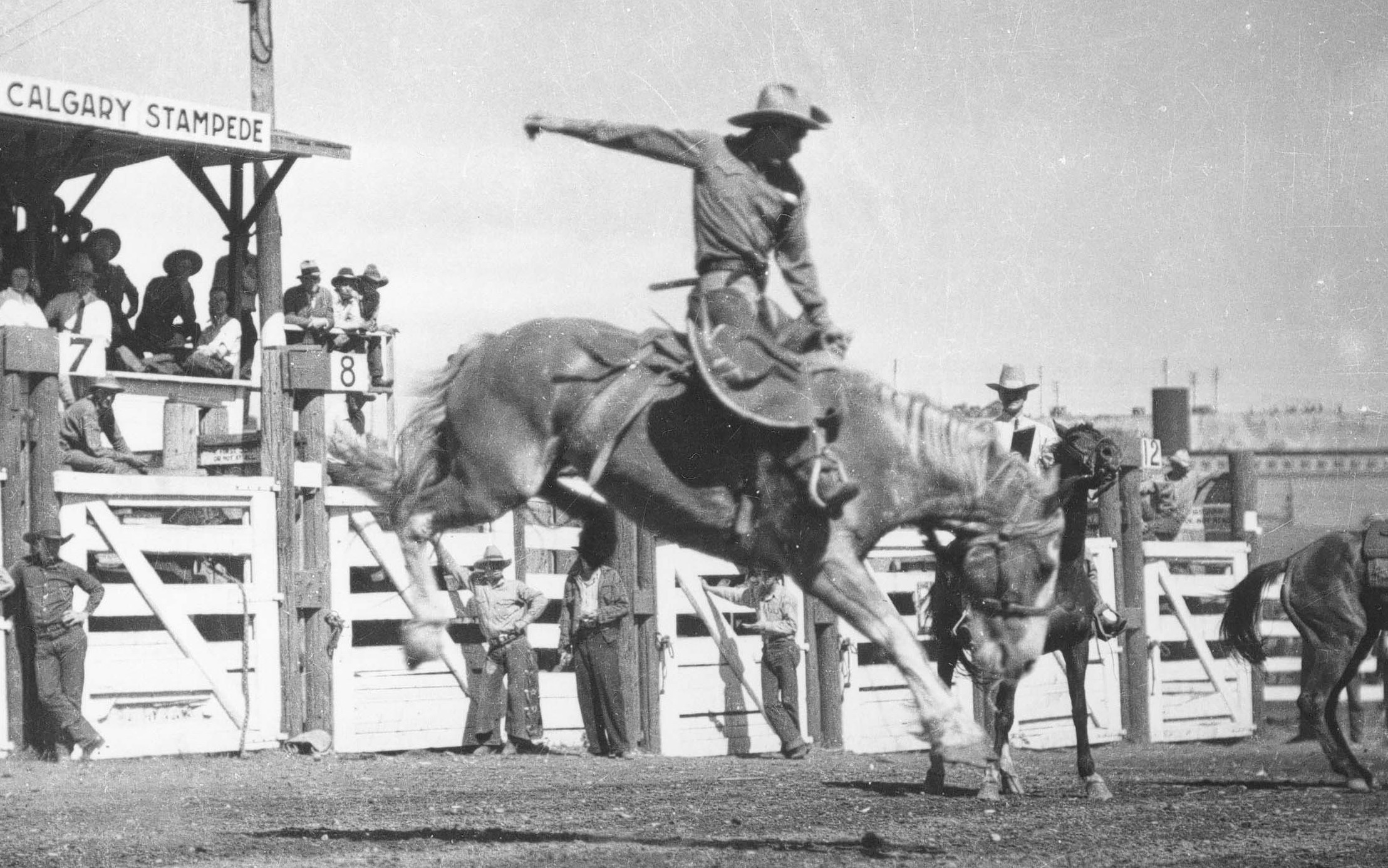
Pete Knight, the CET's first World Champion

The shrinking role of the eastern-Canada based military coincided with a burst of CET activity in western-Canada. Pete Knight became the CET's first World Champion in 1932, as the RAA World Champion Bronc Rider. He would repeat the feat in 1933, 1935, and 1936, and was popularly known as the CET's "King of the Cowboys".

The end of centralized control of the CET also caused a series of inter-related civilian groups to come in and out of being, as equestrian sport began a period of significant but disorganized growth across Canada.

In 1948, Major General CC Mann founded the Canadian Equestrian Society (CES), in an effort to create a single organizing focus for Canada's eventing and jumping teams. Although the CES lasted only two years, it put in place many of the factors that would continue to define the CET to the present.

The CES initiated planning for Canada's Olympic equestrian debut at the 1952 Helsinki Games, it created the maple leaf and horseshoe team emblem, and it popularized the term "Canadian Equestrian Team". Critically, when Major General Mann dissolved the CES in 1950, he placed its material and intellectual assets in the public domain. This enabled others to complete the process of building Canada's first Olympic equestrian team, made the Mann logo the most widely used emblem for Canada's international equestrians across all disciplines and all organizations, and made "Canadian Equestrian Team" a unifying term over a fragmented and constantly changing horse sport system.

=== Olympic Debut ===
After the end of the CES, the Canadian Horse Shows Association (CHSA) provided bridging funding to CET athletes, until Major LJ McGuinness founded the Canadian Olympic Equestrian Team (COET) in 1951, to manage Canada's first participation in the Olympic equestrian events. The COET was largely run by the athletes themselves and their immediate supporters: Major McGuinness also captained and rode for the Canadian eventing team at the 1952 Helsinki Olympics.

It was not until 1959 that a formal Canadian Olympic Equestrian Committee (COEC) corporation was created, with RH Rough serving as its first Executive Director. Since then, there has been a steady expansion in the number and the scale of professional organizations responsible for different CET disciplines.

The CET won its first Olympic medal in 1956, a team bronze in eventing. It won its first Olympic gold medal in 1968, a team gold in jumping. It won its first team World Championship in 1970, by its team at the FEI Jumping World Championship.

== Achievements ==
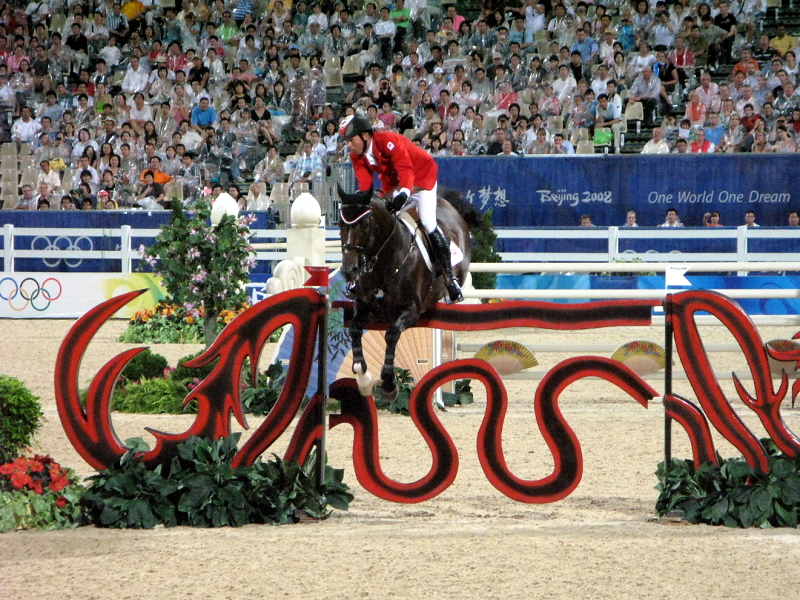
Eric Lamaze and Hickstead at the 2008 Summer Olympics

The CET achieved its greatest success to date in 2010, when Canada was frequently described as one of the top three equestrian nations.

At that time, CET athletes simultaneously held six separate World, Olympic, and Paralympic championships: the FEI Reining World Championship (Duane Latimer and Hang Ten Surprise); the FEI Tent Pegging World Championship (Akaash Maharaj and Gagan); the PRCA Steer Wrestling World Championship (Lee Graves); the WCJA Jousting World Championship (Shane Adams and Dragon); the IOC Jumping Olympic Championship (Eric Lamaze and Hickstead); and the IPC Dressage II Freestyle Paralympic Championship (Lauren Barwick and Maile).

== World, Olympic, and Paralympic Champions ==
Year	Championship	Athletes	Governing Body
2009	Steer Wrestling World Championship	Lee Graves (various)	PRCA
2008	Paralympic Dressage II Freestyle	Lauren Barwick (Maile)	IPC
2008	Olympic Jumping	Eric Lamaze (Hickstead)	IOC
2008	Tent Pegging World Championship	Akaash Maharaj (Gagan)	FEI
2006	Reining World Championship	Duane Latimer (Hang Ten Surprise)	FEI
1994	Steer Wrestling World Championship	Blaine Pederson (various)	PRCA
1986	Jumping World Championship	Gail Greenough (Mr T)	FEI
1978	Eventing World Championship	Elizabeth Ashton (Sunrise), Juliet Bishop (Sumatra), Mark Ishoy (Law and Order), Cathy Wedge (Abracadabra)	FEI
1970	Jumping World Championship	James Day (Canadian Club), Moffat Dunlap (Argyll), Jim Elder (Shoeman), Thomas Gayford (Big Dee)	FEI
1968	Olympic Jumping	James Day (Canadian Club), Jim Elder (The Immigrant), Thomas Gayford (Big Dee)	IOC
1933	Bareback Riding World Championship	Nate Waldron (unrecorded)	RAA
1932, 1933, 1935, 1936	Saddle Bronc World Championship	Pete Knight (various)	RAA

== CET Governing Bodies ==
As of 2013 there are fifteen independent national governing bodies in Canada governing CET athletes in international competitions. The three largest are Equine Canada for the Olympic and Paralympic teams, the Canadian Professional Rodeo Association for rodeo and western riding teams, and Polo Canada for the Canadian polo team.
