= Dumitru Berciu =

Romanian historian and archaeologist (1907–1998)

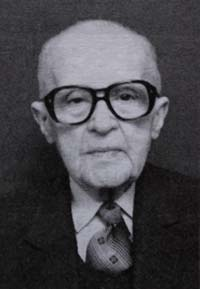
- Dumitru Berciu
- Born: 27 January 1907; Bobaița, Mehedinți, Romania
- Died: 1 July 1998 (aged 91); Bucharest, Romania
- Citizenship: Romanian
- Scientific career
- Fields: History, Archaeology
- Workplaces: Romanian Academy

Dumitru Berciu (27 January 1907, Bobaița, Mehedinți – 1 July 1998, Bucharest) was a Romanian historian and archaeologist, honorary member of the Romanian Academy.

He conducted research in South-Eastern and Central Europe, focusing on Geto-Dacians, Thracians and Celts. Dumitru Berciu was governor of National Bank of Romania between 1934 and 1944 and the director of the Romanian Institute of Thracology in Bucharest after 1948. Later in his career, he also focused on the Neolithic and Chalcolithic periods in the Balkans. He is known for his contribution to the development of absolute chronology of prehistoric settlements in the Balkans (Romania and Bulgaria).

He was a modern Maecenas for the Romanian culture. He helped people, supported foundations, journals and institutions. In 1921, Dumitru Berciu founded the Drobeta-Turnu Severin City Library and donated over 30,000 volumes. He financially supported lifting the Drobeta-Turnu Severin Palace of Culture, where he installed his library bearing his name to date.

== Publications ==
- Îndrumări în preistorie, 1939
- Contribuții la preistoria Transilvaniei, 1942
- Cercetări și săpături arheologice în județele Turda și Alba, 1945
- Contribuția lui Ion Andriesescu la preistoria Daciei și a sud-estului European, 1945
- Cetatea Alba Iulia, 1962
- Cultura Hamangia, 1966
- Zorile istoriei în Carpați și la Dunăre, 1966
- La izvoarele istoriei, 1967
- O introducere în arheologia preistorică, 1967
- The Roman Empire and its neighbours, 1967
- România înainte de Burebista, 1967
- Unitate și continuitate în istoria poporului român, 1968
- Arta traco-getică, 1969
- Lumea celților, 1970
- Daco-România, 1978
- Buridava dacică, 1981

== See also ==
- Dacia
- List of Romanian archaeologists
- Helmet of Coțofenești
