= Bunty Thompson =

Australian equestrian (1925–2017)

Wyatt 'Bunty' Thompson (20 April 1925 – 15 December 2017) was an Australian equestrian rider who competed in the 1956 Summer Olympics in Stockholm, Sweden. In 2012, he was inducted into Equestrian Australia's Hall of Fame with teammates Brian Crago, Ern Barker, David Wood, Franz Mairinger and Alec Creswick, who were members of Australia's first Olympic equestrian team.
