= Brian Herbinson =

Canadian equestrian (1930–2022)

Personal information
- Born: 25 November 1930 Ballymena, Northern Ireland
- Died: 30 August 2022 (aged 91) Aurora, Ontario, Canada
Medal record
Equestrian
Representing Canada
Olympic Games
Bronze medal – third place	1956 Stockholm	Team eventing
Pan American Games
Gold medal – first place	1959 Chicago	Team eventing

Brian Alexander Herbinson (25 November 1930 – 30 August 2022) was a member of the Canadian Equestrian Team. He was born in Ballymena. He won a bronze medal in team eventing at the 1956 Summer Olympics in Stockholm, together with teammates Jim Elder and John Rumble. He placed 20th in individual eventing at the same games.
