= John Rumble =

Canadian equestrian (1933–2023)

Personal information
- Born: John Mitchell Rumble; 27 August 1933 St Marys, Ontario, Canada
- Died: 5 December 2023 (aged 90) Newmarket, Ontario, Canada
Medal record
Equestrian
Representing Canada
Olympic Games
Bronze medal – third place	1956 Stockholm	Team eventing

John Rumble (27 August 1933 – 5 December 2023) was a Canadian equestrian. He was a member of the Canadian national equestrian team in eventing. Rumble won a team bronze medal in eventing at the 1956 Summer Olympics in Stockholm, together with teammates Jim Elder and Brian Herbinson. He placed 16th in individual eventing.

In 2009, Rumble was inducted in the Canadian Eventing Hall of Fame.

Rumble died at the Southlake Regional Health Centre in Newmarket, Ontario, on 5 December 2023, at the age of 90.
