= Petrus Kastenman =

Swedish equestrian

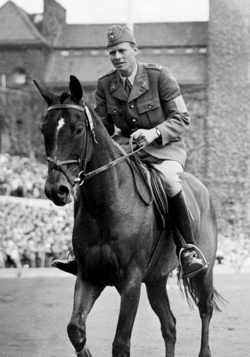
- Petrus Kastenman at the 1956 Olympics

Personal information
- Born: 15 August 1924 Bälinge, Sweden
- Died: 10 June 2013 (aged 88) Stenstorp, Sweden

Sport
- Sport: Equestrian
- Event: Eventing
- Club: Skövde FRK
Medal record
Equestrian
Representing Sweden
Olympic Games
Gold medal – first place	1956 Stockholm	Individual eventing
European Championships
Bronze medal – third place	1957 Copenhagen	Team eventing

Lars Petrus Ragnar Kastenman, né Kahlsson (15 August 1924 – 10 June 2013) was a Swedish Army officer and equestrian who won an individual gold medal in eventing at the 1956 Summer Olympics in Stockholm.

== Early life ==
Kastenman was born on 15 August 1924 in the cottage named Draget, close to Nynäs Castle in Bälinge socken, Södermanland, Sweden, the son of Johan Kahlsson and his wife Elin (née Johansson). His father was a tailor who fell out of a window and was forced to amputate both legs and who now lived out his days as a merchant; he ran a business in his own cottage. As a child, Kastenman used to sit and look out the kitchen window at how the horsemen drove with timber on the ice of Rundbosjön before they came into the cottage to drink coffee. After his father died, his mother remarried to the hunter at the castle. Kastenman had to keep the estate owner's dogs going for weeks, so they were properly trained when the weekend guests came out to the castle and wanted to hunt. Kastenman also had to go hunting early. He was ten when he got his first shotgun. At the age of thirteen, he started working as a stable boy on farms in Södermanland, and a few years later he was a hunting student at Marcus Wallenberg Sr.'s Mörkö. As a stable boy in Taxinge, he received a kind of top education from a man called "Hästjohan".

== Career ==
Kastenman took up horse riding at the age of 17, when he enlisted in the Life Regiment of Horse in Stockholm. He attended the Army Riding School from 1946 to 1947 and in 1949 he transferred from K 1 in Stockholm to the Life Regiment Hussars (K 3) in Skövde. In 1950 he passed realexamen (graduation from Realskola) and in 1951 he attended the Swedish Army Non-Commissioned Officer School. When he was moved to K 3 in Skövde in 1949, the officers had to choose their horses according to rank and when it was Kastenman's turn, there were only two horses left. One of them was Illuster.

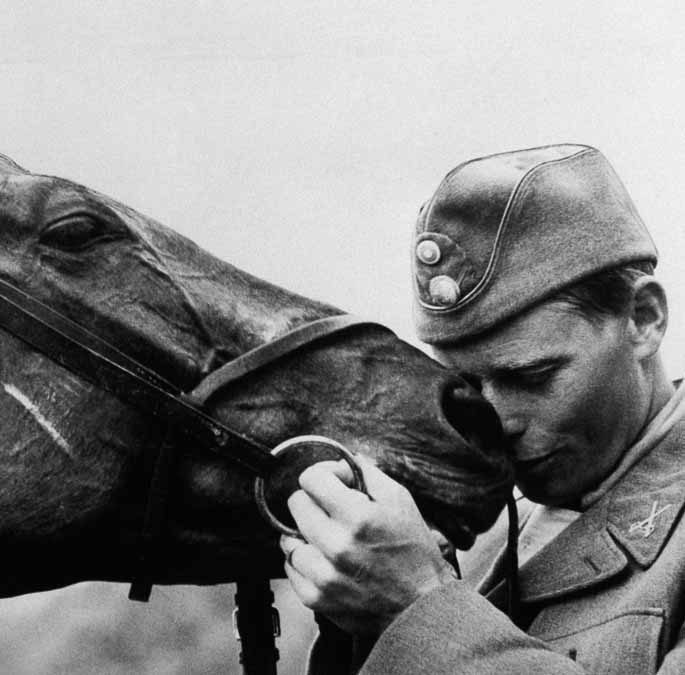
Kastenman and Illuster in 1956.

It took six years before Kastenman and Illuster were entrusted to represent the regiment in major championships. There were those who resented the successes, and now that Illuster had developed so well, there were senior officers who thought it ridiculous that a simple sergeant should have such a good horse. Despite this, the two managed to stay close to each other until 1956, when the Olympics took place in Melbourne but where the games' equestrian competitions, due to quarantine regulations, were held in Stockholm. Kastenman and Illuster had qualified for the individual eventing, but once there they were ordered to hold back for tactical reasons. The Swede Hans von Blixen-Finecke Jr. had won Olympic gold in 1952, and it was he who would go for gold again. In order to also get a good place in the team eventing, the other two, Kastenman and Johan Asker, would go as carefully as possible. It was important that all three participants in the team eventing finished in all events.

Conditions changed drastically when Asker's horse broke his leg during the cross-country event. Kastenman heard the order "The team is broken, Johan is gone, go for victory" and increased the speed. The rainy weather and the wet, muddy Järvafältet suited the durable Illuster well. Now he had a reassuring lead before the final jumping event. Kastenman and Illuster jumped first of the medal candidates. They knocked down two obstacles and thus made the jumping event an open story. Kastenman then got up and sat down with radio commentator Lennart Hyland and commented the rest of the competition. Francis Weldon was last in the 1956 Olympics and was also the biggest threat to Kastenman. He rode on Queen Elizabeth's horse Kilbarry, which had not knocked down an obstacle in two years. But probably the lactic acid remained with Kilbarry after the hard hardships at Järvafältet the day before and the crew made several mistakes. When they crashed into the moat, it dawned on Kastenman in the radio studio that he had won the gold medal.

His regiment announced that in the future he would be allowed to have Illuster as a service horse, which meant that as long as they both remained at K 3 in Skövde, no one would be allowed to take Illuster and Kastenman apart. He served in K 3 until 1974 when he retired from the military as captain.

In 1969, his family moved to Borgunda, where he built a championship eventing course. During the 1970s and 1980s, he was the national coach for juniors, young riders and pony riders, and also coach of the Norwegian and the Finnish national teams. At one time, he coached five different teams.

== Personal life ==
In 1951 he married Anna-Lisa Hermansson (born 1924), the daughter of Herman Andersson and Helna Lundberg. He was the father of Björn (born 1953) and Monica (born 1956).

In his later years, he lived in a retirement home in Stenstorp, where he died on 10 June 2013 at the age of 88.

== Awards and decorations ==
- (Sweden) H. M. The King's Medal, 8th size (June 1956)
