= Alfons Lütke-Westhues =

German equestrian

Medal record

Equestrian

Representing Germany

Olympic Games
Gold medal – first place	1956 Stockholm	Show jumping, Team

Alfons Lütke-Westhues (17 May 1930 in Westbevern – 8 March 2004 in Warendorf) was a German equestrian and Olympic champion. He won a gold medal in show jumping with the German team at the 1956 Summer Olympics in Stockholm. He rode a horse named 'Ala'. On one of the jumps, he was thrown out of the saddle, and clung to the horse and got back on, though this move lost them 3 points. They came 2nd.

His brother Lutz, August Lütke-Westhues was also an equestrian, who won two Olympic silver medals. He wasn't able to compete as his horse became sick. So the team was down to Alfons riding Ala, Hans-Guenther Vinkler riding Halla and Fritz Tiedeman riding Meteor. They ended up coming 1st.
