= Turkey at the 1956 Summer Olympics =

- IOC code: TUR
- NOC: Turkish National Olympic Committee

in Melbourne/Stockholm
- Flag bearer: Hamit Kaplan
- Medals Ranked 12th: Gold 3 Silver 2 Bronze 2 Total 7

Summer Olympics appearances (overview)
- 1908; 1912; 1920; 1924; 1928; 1932; 1936; 1948; 1952; 1956; 1960; 1964; 1968; 1972; 1976; 1980; 1984; 1988; 1992; 1996; 2000; 2004; 2008; 2012; 2016; 2020; 2024

Other related appearances
- 1906 Intercalated Games

Turkey competed at the 1956 Summer Olympics in Melbourne, Australia and Stockholm, Sweden (equestrian events).

== Medalists ==
Medal	Name	Sport	Event
Gold	Mithat Bayrak	Wrestling	Men's Greco-Roman Welterweight
Gold	Mustafa Dağıstanlı	Wrestling	Freestyle Bantamweight
Gold	Hamit Kaplan	Wrestling	Freestyle Heavyweight
Silver	Rıza Doğan	Wrestling	Greco-Roman Lightweight
Silver	İbrahim Zengin	Wrestling	Freestyle Welterweight
Bronze	Dursun Ali Eğribaş	Wrestling	Greco-Roman Flyweight
Bronze	Hüseyin Akbaş	Wrestling	Freestyle Flyweight

== Competitors ==
=== Equestrian ===
Bedri Böke, Nail Gönenli, Arslan Güneş, (Note: otherwise Alparslan or Alpaslan Güneş) Fethi Gürcan; Salih Koç, Kemal Özçelik

=== Wrestling ===
Hüseyin Akbaş, Adil Atan, İsmet Atlı, Mithat Bayrak, Mustafa Dağıstanlı, Rıza Doğan, Dursun Ali Eğribaş, Adil Güngör, Hamit Kaplan, Müzahir Sille, Bayram Şit, Yaşar Yılmaz, İbrahim Zengin
