= Malovăț =

- Commune
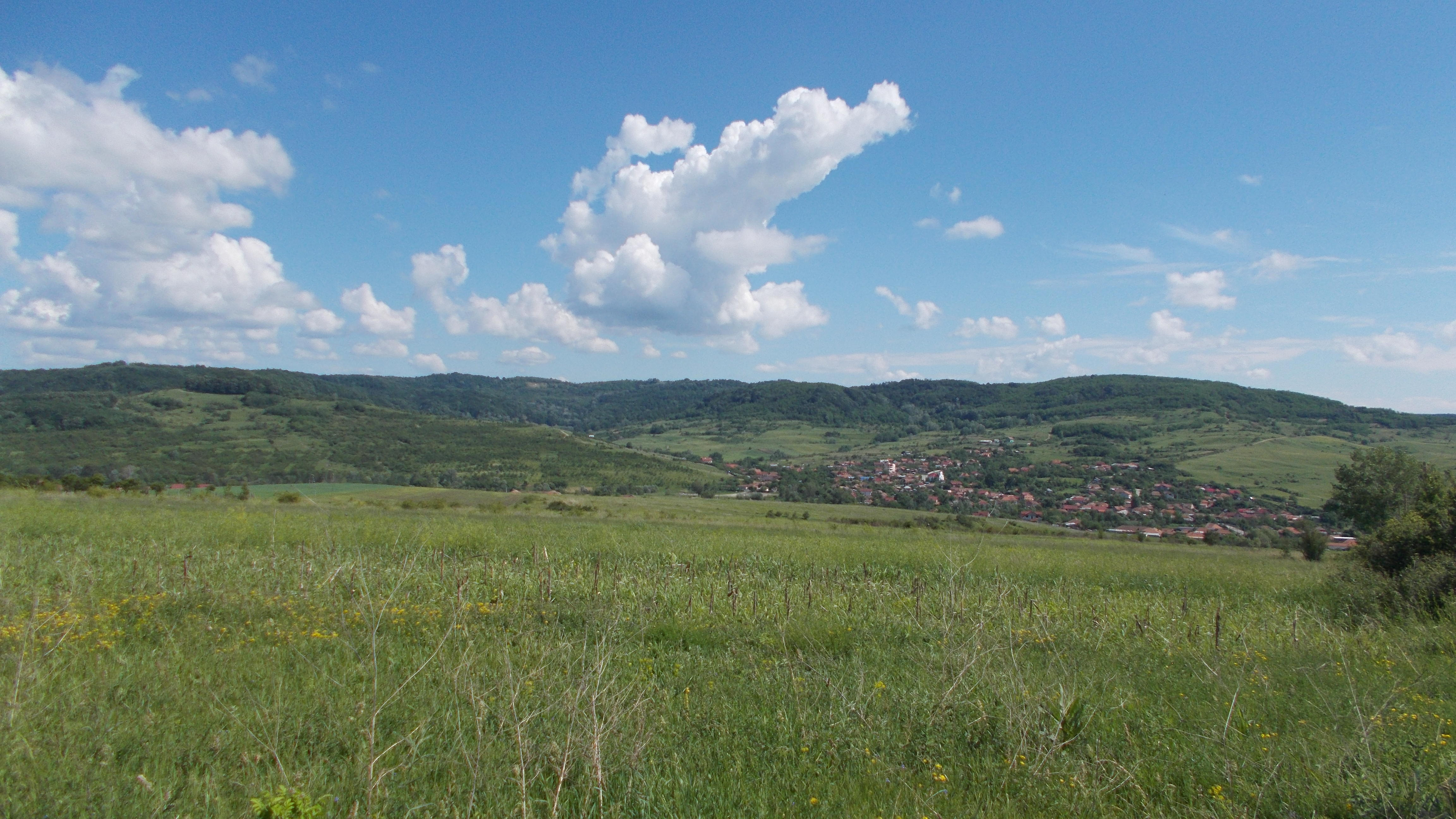
- Malovăț village

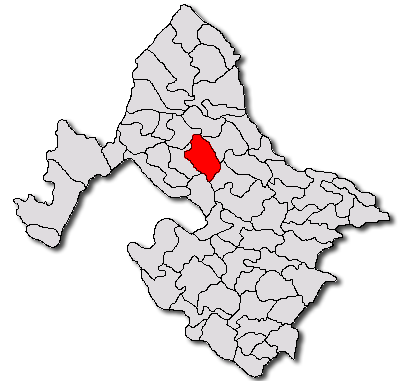
- Location in Mehedinți County

- Location in Romania
- Coordinates: 44°42′N 22°44′E
- Country: Romania
- County: Mehedinți

Government
  - Mayor (2024–2028): Ion Michescu (PSD)
- Area: 110 km^{2} (42 sq mi)
- Elevation: 108 m (354 ft)
- Population (2021-12-01): 2,618
  - Density: 24/km^{2} (62/sq mi)
- Time zone: UTC+02:00 (EET)
  - Summer (DST): UTC+03:00 (EEST)
- Postal code: 227315
- Area code: +(40) 252
- Vehicle reg.: MH
- Website: comunamalovat.ro

Malovăț is a commune located in Mehedinți County, Oltenia, Romania. It is composed of seven villages: 23 August, Bârda, Bobaița, Colibași, Lazu, Malovăț, and Negrești.

Historical population
Year	Pop.	±%
2002	3,005	—
2011	2,780	−7.5%
2021	2,618	−5.8%
Source: Census data

== Notable people ==
- Ecaterina Andronescu (born 1948), scientist and politician
- Baba Anujka (1836 or 1838–1938), serial killer
- Virgil Bărbuceanu (1927–2004), equestrian who competed at the 1956 and 1960 Summer Olympics
- Dumitru Berciu (1907–1998), historian and archaeologist
- Dumitru Ghiață (1888–1972), painter
