= Alain Bouchet =

French equestrian

Personal information
- Nationality: French
- Born: 1927
- Died: 15 July 1975 (aged 47–48)

Sport
- Sport: Equestrian

Alain Bouchet (1927 – 15 July 1975) was a French equestrian. He competed in two events at the 1956 Summer Olympics.
