= Klaus Wagner (equestrian) =

German equestrian

Medal record

Equestrian

Representing Germany

Olympic Games
Silver medal – second place	1952 Helsinki	Team eventing

European Championships
Silver medal – second place	1954 Basel	Team eventing

Klaus Wagner (16 January 1922 – 16 August 2001) was a German equestrian.

== Professional career ==
He competed in equestrian at the 1952 Summer Olympics in Helsinki, where he won a silver medal in the team eventing, and placed fifth in the individual contest. He competed in equestrian at the 1956 Summer Olympics in Stockholm, where he won a silver medal in the team competition in eventing (along with August Lütke-Westhues and Otto Rothe).
