= Juan Martín-Merbilháa =

Argentine equestrian

Personal information
- Nationality: Argentine
- Born: 11 December 1925
- Died: 28 May 1972 (aged 46)

Sport
- Sport: Equestrian

Juan Martín-Merbilháa (11 December 1925 – 28 May 1972) was an Argentine equestrian. He competed in two events at the 1956 Summer Olympics.
