= Jack Burton (equestrian) =

American equestrian (1919–2019)

Personal information
- Born: October 27, 1919 Berwyn, Illinois, United States
- Died: May 29, 2019 (aged 99) Tucson, Arizona, United States

Sport
- Sport: Equestrian

Jonathan Rowell Burton (October 27, 1919 – May 29, 2019) was an American equestrian. He competed in two events at the 1956 Summer Olympics.
