= Kaarlo Anttinen =

Finnish equestrian (1915–2005)

Personal information
- Nationality: Finnish
- Born: 10 March 1915; Kuopio, Finland
- Died: 21 June 2005 (aged 90); Satakunta, Finland

Sport
- Sport: Equestrian

Kaarlo Anttinen (10 March 1915 – 21 June 2005) was a Finnish equestrian. He competed in two events at the 1956 Summer Olympics.
