= Bill Mullins (equestrian) =

Irish equestrian and army officer (1920-2015)

Personal information
- Full name: William Brendan Mullins
- Nationality: Irish
- Born: 23 February 1920 Graiguenamanagh, County Kilkenny
- Died: 27 December 2015 (aged 95) Kilcullen, County Kildare
- Military career
- Allegiance: Ireland
- Branch: Irish Army Equitation School
- Service years: 1938-1978
- Rank: Colonel
- Commands: Quartermaster-General; Director of the Supply & Transport Corps

Sport
- Sport: Equestrian
Medal record
Equestrian
Representing Ireland
European Championships
| Silver medal – second place | 1967 Punchestown | Team eventing |

William Brendan Mullins (23 February 1920 – 27 December 2015) was an Irish equestrian and Irish Army officer. Born in 1920 in Graiguenamanagh, County Kilkenny and educated in Knockbeg College, William joined the Army in 1938 and was commissioned the following year. He served in the Army Equitation School and was member of the winning Irish team of the 1949 Aga Khan. He competed in two events at the 1956 Summer Olympics. He retired from equestrian competition in 1970 and was appointed Quartermaster-General in 1973 and retired from the Army in 1978. William died in 2015 in Kilcullen, County Kildare.
