= Alexander Stoffel =

Swiss equestrian

Personal information
- Nationality: Swiss
- Born: 12 November 1928; Geneva, Switzerland
- Died: 24 September 2017 (aged 88)

Sport
- Sport: Equestrian

Alexander Stoffel (12 November 1928 – 24 September 2017) was a Swiss equestrian. He competed at the 1952 Summer Olympics and the 1956 Summer Olympics.
