= Giancarlo Gutierrez =

Italian equestrian (1932–2025)

Personal information
- Nationality: Italian
- Born: 11 July 1932; Cagliari, Italy
- Died: May 2025 (aged 92)

Sport
- Sport: Equestrian

Giancarlo Gutierrez (11 July 1932 – 28 May 2025) was an Italian equestrian. He competed in two events at the 1956 Summer Olympics.

Gutierrez died on 28 May 2025, at the age of 92.
