= William de Rham =

Swiss equestrian (born 1922)

William Guy Pierre de Rham (born 22 August 1922) is a Swiss former equestrian who competed in the 1956 Summer Olympics. He turned 100 on 22 August 2022.
