= Karl Ammitzböll =

Danish equestrian

Personal information
- Nationality: Danish
- Born: 22 August 1915; Frederikssund, Denmark
- Died: 5 December 1985 (aged 70); Frederikssund, Denmark

Sport
- Sport: Equestrian

Karl Ammitzböll (22 August 1915 – 5 December 1985) was a Danish equestrian. He competed in two events at the 1956 Summer Olympics.
