= Kari Tolvanen (equestrian) =

Finnish equestrian

Personal information
- Nationality: Finnish
- Born: 13 December 1916; Oulunsalo, Finland
- Died: 1 March 1993 (aged 76); Kuopio, Finland

Sport
- Sport: Equestrian

Kari Tolvanen (13 December 1916 – 1 March 1993) was a Finnish equestrian. He competed in two events at the 1956 Summer Olympics.
