= Ernie Barker =

Australian equestrian (1913–1996)

Personal information
- Full name: Ernest Frederick Barker
- Nationality: Australian
- Born: 6 March 1913; Oakleigh, Victoria, Australia
- Died: 14 February 1996 (aged 82); Warragul, Victoria, Australia

Sport
- Sport: Equestrian
- Event: Eventing

Ernie Barker (6 March 1913 – 14 February 1996) was an Australian equestrian. He competed in two events at the 1956 Summer Olympics.

Later in life Ernie ran a regular saturday clinic for many years, where for a minimal fee he welcomed aspiring young jumpers of all abilities. He generously devoted his time to sharing his knowledge, helping horses be relaxed about jumping and their young riders gain invaluable skills and confidence.
