= Carlos Figueroa (equestrian) =

Spanish equestrian (1931–2012)

Carlos Figueroa Castillejo
Personal information
- Born: 12 December 1931
- Died: 18 January 2012 (aged 80) Marbella, Spain

Sport
- Sport: Equestrian

Carlos Figueroa (12 December 1931 – 18 January 2012) was a Spanish equestrian. He competed at the 1956 Summer Olympics. His grandfather, Don Álvaro de Figueroa, was the Prime Minister of Spain between 1912 and 1918.
