= Carlos de la Serna =

Argentine equestrian

Personal information
- Born: 25 July 1921; Buenos Aires, Argentina
- Died: 12 March 2005 (aged 83); Buenos Aires, Argentina

Sport
- Sport: Equestrian

Carlos de la Serna (25 July 1921 – 12 March 2005) was an Argentine equestrian. He competed in two events at the 1956 Summer Olympics.
