= Gheorghe Soare =

Romanian equestrian (born 1929)

Personal information
- Nationality: Romanian
- Born: 1929

Sport
- Sport: Equestrian

Gheorghe Soare (born 1929) was a Romanian equestrian. He competed in two events at the 1956 Summer Olympics.
