= Milo Gmür =

Swiss equestrian

Personal information
- Full name: Emil-Otto Gmür
- Nationality: Swiss
- Born: 1918
- Died: 22 August 1988 (aged 69–70)

Sport
- Sport: Equestrian

Emil-Otto "Milo" Gmür (1918 – 22 August 1988) was a Swiss equestrian. He competed in two events at the 1956 Summer Olympics.
