= Otto Rothe =

German equestrian (1924–1970)

Otto Rothe (6 November 1924 – 9 January 1970) was a German equestrian. He was born in Samonienen in East Prussia (today part of Russia). He competed in equestrian at the 1952 Summer Olympics in Helsinki, where he won a silver medal in the team eventing, and placed eleventh in the individual contest. He competed in equestrian at the 1956 Summer Olympics in Stockholm, where he won a silver medal in the team competition in eventing (along with August Lütke-Westhues and Klaus Wagner). Rothe died in a car accident in 1970.
