= Gottfried Trachsel =

Swiss equestrian

Personal information
- Born: 5 October 1907
- Died: 15 June 1974 (aged 66)
Medal record
Equestrian
Olympic Games
Representing Switzerland
Silver medal – second place	1952 Helsinki	Dressage team
Bronze medal – third place	1956 Stockholm	Dressage team

Gottfried Trachsel (5 October 1907 – 15 June 1974) was a Swiss equestrian. He placed fourth in individual dressage, won a silver medal in team dressage at the 1952 Summer Olympics in Helsinki, and a won bronze medal in team dressage at the 1956 Summer Olympics.
