= Giuseppe Molinari (equestrian) =

Italian equestrian (born 1918)

Personal information
- Nationality: Italian
- Born: 1918

Sport
- Sport: Equestrian

Giuseppe Molinari (born 1918, date of death unknown) was an Italian equestrian. He competed in two events at the 1956 Summer Olympics. Molinari is deceased.
