= Reijo Kuistila =

Finnish equestrian (1931–2020)

Personal information
- Nationality: Finnish
- Born: 23 September 1931; Hämeenlinna, Finland
- Died: 20 January 2020 (aged 88)

Sport
- Sport: Equestrian

Reijo Kuistila (23 September 1931 – 20 January 2020) was a Finnish equestrian. He competed in two events at the 1956 Summer Olympics.
