= Eduardo Cano =

Argentine equestrian

Personal information
- Full name: Eduardo Wilfredo Cano
- Nationality: Argentine
- Born: 17 April 1928
- Died: 5 January 1975 (aged 46) Tucumán Province, Argentina

Sport
- Sport: Equestrian

Eduardo Wilfredo Cano (17 April 1928 – 5 January 1975) was an Argentine equestrian. He competed in two events at the 1956 Summer Olympics.

Cano was an officer of the Argentine Army, at the time of his death he held the rank of colonel. He died on 5 January 1975 when the Argentine Army Aviation DHC-6 Twin Otter he was travelling on crashed into a mountain in Tucumán Province, killing all 13 occupants on board, including Cano.
