= Frank Duffy (equestrian) =

American equestrian (born 1937)

Personal information
- Born: January 22, 1937 (age 89) Honolulu, Hawaii, U.S.

Sport
- Sport: Equestrian

Frank Duffy (born January 22, 1937) is an American equestrian. He competed in two events at the 1956 Summer Olympics. He earned degrees from the University of Michigan and Harvard Medical School.
