= Gheorghe Langa =

Romanian equestrian

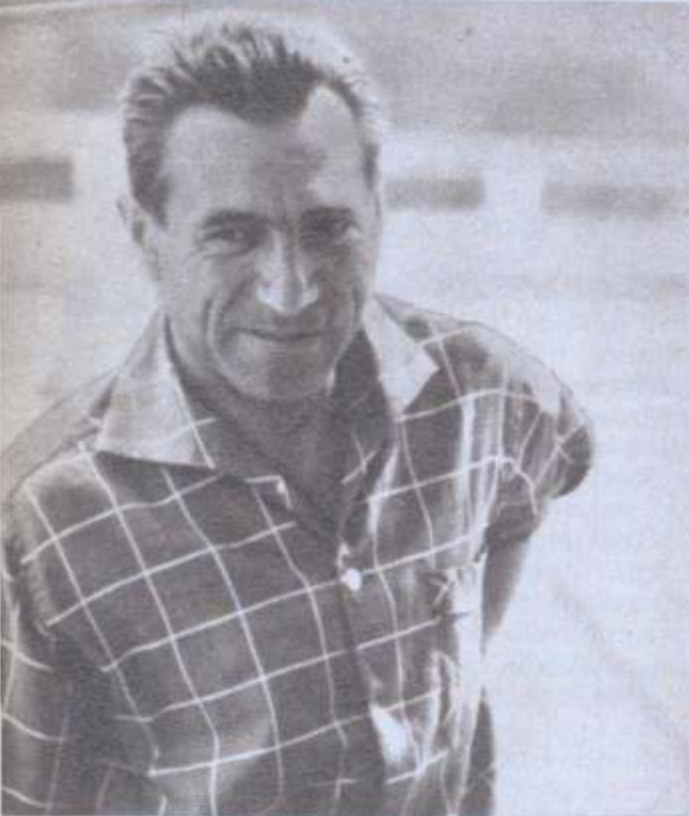
- Gheorghe Langa in 1968

Personal information
- Nationality: Romanian
- Born: 10 January 1930 Jibert, Romania
- Died: 5 August 1968 (aged 38)

Sport
- Sport: Equestrian

Gheorghe Langa (10 January 1930 – 5 August 1968) was a Romanian equestrian. He competed at the 1956 Summer Olympics and the 1960 Summer Olympics.

He was killed in a motor vehicle accident, alongside fellow Romanian equestrian Mihai Timu.
