= Faustino Domínguez =

Spanish equestrian

Personal information
- Nationality: Spanish
- Born: 5 May 1905; A Coruña, Spain
- Died: April 1981; Madrid, Spain

Sport
- Sport: Equestrian

Faustino Domínguez (5 May 1905 – April 1981) was a Spanish equestrian. He competed in two events at the 1956 Summer Olympics.
