= Nikolay Shelenkov =

Soviet equestrian

Personal information
- Nationality: Soviet
- Born: 28 November 1919
- Died: 1 November 1985 (aged 65)

Sport
- Sport: Equestrian

Nikolay Shelenkov (28 November 1919 – 1 November 1985) was a Soviet equestrian. He competed at the 1952 Summer Olympics and the 1956 Summer Olympics.
