= Lev Baklyshkin =

Soviet equestrian

Personal information
- Nationality: Soviet
- Born: 24 September 1933 Moscow, Russia
- Died: 28 July 2011 (aged 77) Moscow, Russia

Sport
- Sport: Equestrian
Medal record
Equestrian
Representing the Soviet Union
European Championships
Gold medal – first place	1962 Burghley	Team eventing
Gold medal – first place	1965 Moscow	Team eventing
Silver medal – second place	1965 Moscow	Individual eventing

Lev Baklyshkin (24 September 1933 – 28 July 2011) was a Soviet equestrian. He competed at the 1956 Summer Olympics and the 1960 Summer Olympics.
