= Johan Asker =

Swedish equestrian

Personal information
- Nationality: Swedish
- Born: 22 April 1915; Saint Petersburg, Russia
- Died: 14 December 2000 (aged 85); Svedala, Sweden

Sport
- Sport: Equestrian

Johan Asker (22 April 1915 – 14 December 2000) was a Swedish equestrian. He competed in two events at the 1956 Summer Olympics.
