= Konstantin Venkov =

Bulgarian equestrian

Personal information
- Nationality: Bulgarian
- Born: 3 June 1925; Veliko Tarnovo, Bulgaria

Sport
- Sport: Equestrian

Konstantin Venkov (Bulgarian: Константин Венков; born 3 June 1925) was a Bulgarian equestrian. He competed at the 1956 Summer Olympics and the 1960 Summer Olympics.
