= Samuel Koechlin =

Swiss equestrian

Personal information
- Nationality: Swiss
- Born: 29 March 1925; Basel, Switzerland
- Died: 25 January 1985 (aged 59); Basel, Switzerland

Sport
- Sport: Equestrian

Samuel Koechlin (29 March 1925 – 25 January 1985) was a Swiss equestrian. He competed in two events at the 1956 Summer Olympics.
