= Bertie Hill =

British equestrian (1927–2005)

Medal record

Equestrian

Representing Great Britain

Olympic Games
Gold medal – first place	1956 Stockholm	Team eventing

European Championships
Gold medal – first place	1953 Badminton	Team eventing
Gold medal – first place	1954 Basel	Team eventing
Gold medal – first place	1954 Basel	Individual eventing
Gold medal – first place	1955 Windsor	Team eventing
Bronze medal – third place	1955 Windsor	Individual eventing

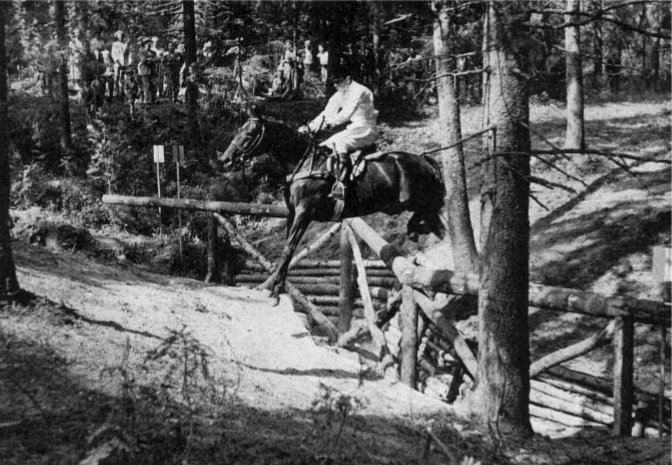
Bertie Hill riding Stella at the 1952 Olympics

Albert "Bertie" Edwin Hill (7 February 1927 – 5 August 2005) was a British equestrian who competed at three Olympic Games.

After serving in the Home Guard during the Second World War, Hill became an amateur jockey in point-to-point racing. He went on to represent Britain in three-day eventing, winning a gold medal at the 1956 games in Stockholm along with a host of other international trophies.

In the 1960s, Hill and his wife opened a riding school at Rapscott on Exmoor, training a number of future international riders including Princess Anne and Captain Mark Phillips.
