= Roland Perret =

Swiss equestrian

Personal information
- Nationality: Swiss
- Born: 23 October 1927 Thurgau, Switzerland
- Died: 12 February 2006 (aged 78) Sankt Gallen, Switzerland

Sport
- Sport: Equestrian

Roland Perret (23 October 1927 – 12 February 2006) was a Swiss equestrian. He competed in two events at the 1956 Summer Olympics.
