= Genko Rashkov =

Bulgarian equestrian (1920–1996)

Personal information
- Nationality: Bulgarian
- Born: 17 January 1920; Plovdiv, Bulgaria
- Died: 1996 (aged 75–76)

Sport
- Sport: Equestrian

Genko Rashkov (Bulgarian: Генко Рашков, 17 January 1920 – 1996) was a Bulgarian equestrian. He competed at the 1956 Summer Olympics and the 1960 Summer Olympics.
