= Virgil Bărbuceanu =

Romanian equestrian

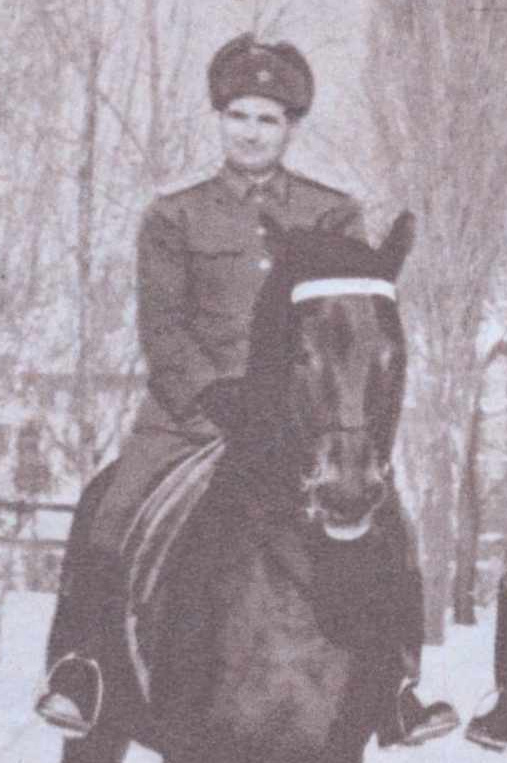

Personal information
- Nationality: Romanian
- Born: 20 April 1927 Bobaița, Romania
- Died: 20 October 2004 (aged 77)

Sport
- Sport: Equestrian

Virgil Bărbuceanu (20 April 1927 –20 October 2004) was a Romanian equestrian. He competed at the 1956 Summer Olympics and the 1960 Summer Olympics.

Born in Bobaița, Mehedinți County, Bărbuceanu attended high school in Turnu Severin, and graduated in 1952 with the rank of lieutenant from the Cavalry Officer School in Sibiu. He then joined the Army Equestrian Club in Bucharest and later served as colonel in the Romanian Army. In 1986, he founded the Equestrian Base in Piatra Neamț, which now bears his name.
