= Adriano Capuzzo =

Italian equestrian

Personal information
- Nationality: Italian
- Born: 11 August 1927; Rome, Italy
- Died: 15 December 2011 (aged 84); Rome, Italy

Sport
- Sport: Equestrian

Adriano Capuzzo (11 August 1927 – 15 December 2011) was an Italian equestrian. He competed in two events at the 1956 Summer Olympics.
