= Lars Kirkebjerg =

Danish equestrian (1922–2000)

Personal information
- Full name: Lars Eivind Bruun Kirkebjerg
- Nationality: Danish
- Born: 2 October 1922 Frederiksberg, Denmark
- Died: 19 December 2000 (aged 78) Fuengirola, Málaga, Spain

Sport
- Sport: Equestrian

Lars Kirkebjerg (2 October 1922 – 19 December 2000) was a Danish equestrian. He competed in two events at the 1956 Summer Olympics. Lars's father, Frode Rasmussen Kirkebjerg, was also an Olympian who won the equestrian silver medal in Individual eventing in 1924.
