= Joaquín Nogueras =

Spanish equestrian

Personal information
- Nationality: Spanish
- Born: 8 December 1906; Úbeda, Spain
- Died: 6 April 1991 (aged 84)

Sport
- Sport: Equestrian

Joaquín Nogueras (8 December 1906 – 6 April 1991) was a Spanish military and equestrian.

== Biography ==
He fought in the Francoist Army during the Spanish Civil War (1936-1939).

He competed in the Equestrian event at the 1948 Summer Olympics, the 1952 Summer Olympics and the 1956 Summer Olympics.

From 1967 to 1969 he was commander general of Melilla. Promoted to lieutenant general, in 1969 he was named captain general of the III Military Region (Valencia), a position he left in 1971 when he was named Captain General of Catalonia and president of the Spanish Equestrian Federation. In 1972, he was replaced as Captain General of Catalonia by Salvador Bañuls y Navarro.
