= Kemal Özçelik =

Turkish equestrian (1922–2020)

Kemal Özçelik (3 May 1922 – 9 August 2020) was a Turkish equestrian who competed at the 1956 Summer Olympics.
