= Hernán Espinosa =

Spanish equestrian

Personal information
- Nationality: Spanish
- Born: 16 May 1916; San Sebastián, Spain
- Died: 6 June 1991 (aged 75); Aranda de Duero, Spain

Sport
- Sport: Equestrian

Hernán Espinosa (16 May 1916 – 6 June 1991) was a Spanish equestrian. He competed at the 1956 Summer Olympics and the 1960 Summer Olympics.
