= Arthur Rook (equestrian) =

English equestrian (1921–1989)

Medal record

Equestrian

Representing Great Britain

Olympic Games
Gold medal – first place	1956 Stockholm	Team eventing

European Championships
Gold medal – first place	1953 Badminton	Individual eventing
Gold medal – first place	1954 Basel	Team eventing
Gold medal – first place	1955 Windsor	Team eventing
Bronze medal – third place	1954 Basel	Individual eventing

Arthur Laurence Rook (26 May 1921 – 30 September 1989) was an English equestrian and Olympic champion. He won a team gold medal in eventing at the 1956 Summer Olympics in Stockholm for United Kingdom. He became European champion in 1953.

Rook was an officer in the British army, the Royal Horse Guards, and served in Egypt and Italy during the Second World War. He received the Military Cross in 1944.
