= Francis Weldon =

British equestrian (1913–1993)

Medal record

Equestrian

Representing Great Britain

Olympic Games
Gold medal – first place	1956 Stockholm	Team eventing
Bronze medal – third place	1956 Stockholm	Individual eventing

European Championships
Gold medal – first place	1953 Badminton	Team eventing
Gold medal – first place	1954 Basel	Team eventing
Gold medal – first place	1955 Windsor	Individual eventing
Gold medal – first place	1955 Windsor	Team eventing
Silver medal – second place	1953 Badminton	Individual eventing
Silver medal – second place	1954 Basel	Individual eventing
Silver medal – second place	1959 Harewood	Individual eventing
Silver medal – second place	1959 Harewood	Team eventing
Bronze medal – third place	1962 Burghley	Team eventing

Francis William Weldon MVO MBE MC (2 August 1913 – 21 September 1993) was a British equestrian and Olympic champion. He won a team gold medal in eventing at the 1956 Summer Olympics in Stockholm, and received an individual bronze medal. He became European champion in 1953, 1954 and 1955.

Weldon was a lieutenant colonel in the British Army and was Officer Commanding, the King's Troop, Royal Horse Artillery.
