= Nail Gönenli =

Turkish equestrian

Personal information
- Nationality: Turkish
- Born: 13 April 1924; Gönen, Turkey
- Died: 1969 (aged 44–45); Sofia, Bulgaria

Sport
- Sport: Equestrian

Nail Gönenli (13 April 1924 – 1969) was a Turkish equestrian. He competed at the 1956 Summer Olympics and the 1960 Summer Olympics.
