= Brian Crago =

Australian equestrian

Personal information
- Nationality: Australian
- Born: 5 May 1926; Mount Barker, South Australia
- Died: 14 April 1998 (aged 71); Hampshire, England

Sport
- Sport: Equestrian
- Event: Eventing

Brian Crago (5 May 1926 – 14 April 1998) was an Australian equestrian. He competed at the 1956 Summer Olympics and the 1960 Summer Olympics.
