= August Lütke-Westhüs =

German equestrian

Medal record

Equestrian

Representing Germany

Olympic Games
Silver medal – second place	1956 Stockholm	Individual eventing
Silver medal – second place	1956 Stockholm	Team eventing

European Championships
Gold medal – first place	1959 Harewood	Team eventing
Silver medal – second place	1954 Basel	Team eventing
Silver medal – second place	1957 Copenhagen	Individual eventing
Silver medal – second place	1957 Copenhagen	Team eventing

August Lütke-Westhüs (25 July 1926 – 8 September 2000) was a German equestrian and Olympic champion. He won a gold medal in show jumping with the German team at the 1956 Summer Olympics in Stockholm.

His brother Alfons Lütke-Westhues was also an equestrian, and won an Olympic gold medal.
