= Jim Elder (equestrian) =

Canadian equestrian

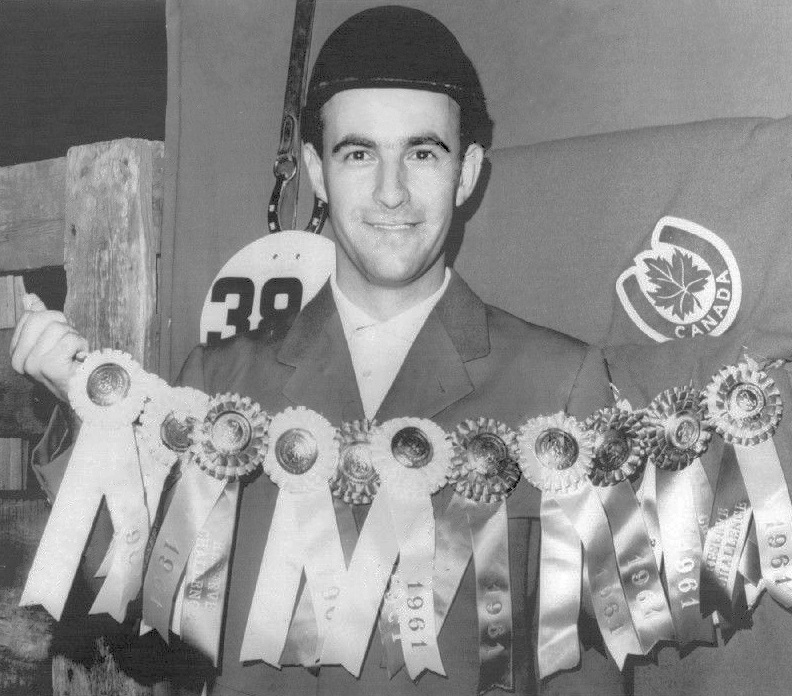
- Elder in 1961

Personal information
- Born: Robert James Elder; 27 July 1934 (age 91) Toronto, Ontario, Canada
- Height: 172 cm (5 ft 8 in)
- Weight: 70 kg (154 lb)

Sport
- Sport: Equestrian
- Event(s): Show jumping, 3-day eventing
Medal record
Representing Canada
Olympic Games
Gold medal – first place	1968 Mexico City	Team jumping
Bronze medal – third place	1956 Stockholm	Team eventing
Pan American Games
Gold medal – first place	1959 Chicago	Team eventing
Gold medal – first place	1971 Cali	Team jumping
Silver medal – second place	1983 Caracas	Individual jumping
Silver medal – second place	1983 Caracas	Team jumping
Bronze medal – third place	1967 Winnipeg	Team jumping
Bronze medal – third place	1975 Mexico City	Team jumping
World Championships
Gold medal – first place	1970 La Baule	Team jumping

Robert James Elder, OC (born 27 July 1934) is a Canadian retired businessman and former equestrian. He competed at six Olympic Games between 1956 and 1984, winning one gold and one bronze medal. He missed the 1964 and 1980 Olympics because Canada did not send eventing and jumping teams there.

== Biography ==
Born in Toronto, Ontario, Elder started competitive jumping at the age of 16 in 1950. During 36 years of competition, he won an Olympic gold medal, one Olympic bronze, five Pan American medals, and a world title. Elder was Canada's flag bearer at the closing ceremony of the 1972 Munich Olympics.

In 1983, he was honoured with the Order of Canada. He was inducted into the Canada's Sports Hall of Fame (1968), Canadian Olympic Hall of Fame (1971), Canada's Walk of Fame (2003), Canadian Eventing Hall of Fame (2009), and the Jump Canada (2010) Hall of Fame.

Elder graduated from the University of Toronto, where he was a member of the Delta Kappa Epsilon fraternity, and he later ran a successful refrigeration company. Since retiring, he has worked with Big Brothers and several other charity foundations, including the Community Association of Riding for the Disabled in Ontario and the Canadian Therapeutic Riding Association. He is also one of the co-founders of the Toronto Polo Club.

Elder's brother, Norman Elder, was an author and explorer. He was also an Olympic equestrian rider at the 1960 and 1968 Olympics. The brothers were on the same eventing teams at the 1959 Pan American Games and 1960 Olympics.

== See also ==
- List of athletes with the most appearances at Olympic Games
