= Equestrian events at the 1956 Summer Olympics =

Equestrian at the Games of the XVI Olympiad
- Venue: Stockholm Olympic Stadium
- Dates: 11–17 June 1956
- No. of events: 6
- Competitors: 158 from 29 nations

The equestrian events at the 1956 Summer Olympics were held in Stockholm due to the Australian quarantine regulations and included dressage, eventing, and show jumping. All three disciplines had both individual and team competitions. The competitions were held from 11 to 17 June 1956 at Stockholm Olympic Stadium. There were 158 entries from 29 National Olympic Committees: Argentina, Australia, Austria, Belgium, Brazil, Bulgaria, Cambodia, Canada, Denmark, Egypt, Finland, France, Germany, Great Britain, Hungary, Ireland, Italy, Japan, Netherlands, Norway, Portugal, Romania, Soviet Union, Spain, Sweden, Switzerland, Turkey, USA and Venezuela. This would be the first appearance for Australia, Cambodia and Venezuela in equestrian events.

Although Melbourne was awarded the 1956 Olympic Games, Australia had a strict six-month pre-shipment quarantine on horses. A meeting in 1953 by Australian federal authorities ruled that they would not change the quarantine laws for the Olympic horses. Therefore, the equestrian competition would not be able to be held in Australia. In 1954, the IOC selected Stockholm, Sweden, as the alternate venue for the equestrian events. Therefore, the equestrian events were not only separated by city or country, but also continent, with the equestrian event being held in June (summer in the Northern Hemisphere) and the other sports held in November (late spring in the Southern Hemisphere).

== Disciplines ==
=== Show jumping ===
A total of 66 riders from 24 countries contested the difficult Greger Lewnhaupt-designed course, which no one was able to ride clear in the first round. Considered the first modern course in Olympic history, it was 775 meters in length, to be ridden at 400m/min, with 14 obstacles and 17 jumping efforts. The gold medal was awarded to Hans Günter Winkler of the Federal Republic of Germany, on his great mare Halla. He finished the first round with 4 faults, after landing heavily after an early takeoff by his mount, resulting in a pulled groin muscle. Knowing that withdrawal from the final round would result in his country's elimination, Winkler rode in the second round, and managed to complete it faultlessly. Winkler would go on to be one of the most medal-winning riders in Olympic history, with 7 medals to his name.

=== Dressage ===
36 riders, 11 of which were women, from 17 nations competed in dressage. Of those 11 women, 2 won an individual medal (including previous silver medalist Lis Hartel) and another placed in the top 10. There was controversy in the judging, since judges tended to have their own opinions of what was considered correct training and riding, and at the time there was no common ideal for dressage. The German and Swedish judges favored their own countrymen, and ended up being suspended by the FEI. Following this controversy, the IOC threatened to remove dressage from the Olympics. The FEI and IOC came to a compromise, resulting in only individual competitors being allowed at the 1960 Games, with up to 2 riders per country.

== Medal summary ==
=== Medal table ===
* Host nation (Sweden)

Rank	Nation	Gold	Silver	Bronze	Total
1	Sweden*	3	0	0	3
2	United Team of Germany	2	3	1	6
3	Great Britain	1	0	2	3
4	Italy	0	2	1	3
5	Denmark	0	1	0	1
6	Canada	0	0	1	1
6	Switzerland	0	0	1	1
Totals (7 entries)		6	6	6	18

=== Medalists ===
Games	Gold	Silver	Bronze
Individual dressage	Henri Saint Cyr and Juli; Sweden	Lis Hartel and Jubilee; Denmark	Liselott Linsenhoff and Adular; United Team of Germany
Team dressage	Sweden; Henri Saint Cyr and Juli; Gehnäll Persson and Knaust; Gustaf Adolf Boltenstern Jr. and Krest	United Team of Germany; Liselott Linsenhoff and Adular; Hannelore Weygand and Perkunos; Anneliese Küppers and Afrika	Switzerland; Gottfried Trachsel and Kursus; Henri Chammartin and Wöhler; Gustav Fischer and Vasello
Individual eventing	Petrus Kastenman and Iluster; Sweden	August Lütke-Westhues and Trux von Kamax; United Team of Germany	Francis Weldon and Kilbarry; Great Britain
Team eventing	Great Britain; Francis Weldon and Kilbarry; Arthur Rook and Wild Venture; Bertie Hill and Countryman III	United Team of Germany; August Lütke-Westhues and Trux von Kamax; Otto Rothe and Sissi; Klaus Wagner and Prinzeß	Canada; John Rumble and Cilroy; Jim Elder and Colleen; Brian Herbinson and Tara
Individual jumping	Hans Günter Winkler and Halla; United Team of Germany	Raimondo D'Inzeo and Merano; Italy	Piero D'Inzeo and Uruguay; Italy
Team jumping	United Team of Germany; Hans Günter Winkler and Halla; Fritz Thiedemann and Meteor; Alfons Lütke-Westhues and Ala	Italy; Raimondo D'Inzeo and Merano; Piero D'Inzeo and Uruguay; Salvatore Oppes and Pagoro	Great Britain; Wilfred White and Nizefela; Pat Smythe and Flanagan; Peter Robeson and Scorchin

== Participating nations ==
A total of 29 nations competed in Stockholm.

- Argentina (7)
- Australia (4)
- Austria (5)
- Belgium (3)
- Brazil (3)
- Bulgaria (4)
- Cambodia (2)
- Canada (4)
- Denmark (6)
- Egypt (3)
- Finland (7)
- France (8)
- United Team of Germany (9)
- Great Britain (8)
- Hungary (3)
- Ireland (6)
- Italy (6)
- Japan (2)
- Netherlands (1)
- Norway (4)
- Portugal (7)
- Romania (6)
- Soviet Union (9)
- Spain (6)
- Sweden (9)
- Switzerland (9)
- Turkey (6)
- United States (8)
- Venezuela (3)

Five nations competed in the equestrian events in Stockholm, but did not attend the Games in Melbourne:

- Cambodia
- Egypt
- Netherlands
- Spain
- Switzerland

Egypt and Cambodia did not compete in Melbourne due to the Suez Crisis, whilst Netherlands, Spain and Switzerland all boycotted the Australian event in protest at the Soviet invasion of Hungary.
