= Equestrian at the 1960 Summer Olympics – Individual eventing =

Equestrian at the Olympics

Individual eventing at the Games of the XVII Olympiad
- Venue: Villa Borghese gardens; Rocca di Papa; Stadio Olimpico
- Date: 6–10 September 1960
- Competitors: 73 from 19 nations

Medalists
1st place, gold medalist(s)		Lawrence Morgan	Australia
2nd place, silver medalist(s)		Neale Lavis	Australia
3rd place, bronze medalist(s)		Anton Bühler	Switzerland

The individual eventing at the 1960 Summer Olympics took place between 6 and 10 September. Eventing was open to men only. It was the 10th appearance of the event.

For the first time since 1924, the eventing team consisted of 4 riders rather than 3. Although 19 nations, with a total of 79 riders, competed, the eventing competition at the 1960 Olympics clearly went to the Australians. The team had fantastic performances cross-country, with three of the four riders (Lawrence "Laurie" Morgan, Neale Lavis, and Brian Crago) in the top three spots of the competition following endurance day. Bill Roycroft, the fourth Australian team member, had fallen on cement drain pipes, resulting in a concussion and broken collar bone. Unfortunately, Brian Crago's mount Sabre was rejected at the final horse inspection, removing him from his current silver-medal position. In order to insure his team finished, Roycroft left the hospital to ride in the final phase, posting a clear round and insuring a team gold for his country.

== Competition format ==
The team and individual eventing competitions used the same results. Eventing consisted of a dressage test, a cross-country test, and a jumping test. The competitor with the best total score (fewest penalty points) won.

- Dressage: The eventing competition featured a dressage test.
- Cross-country: The cross-country test had five phases.
  - Phase A: 7.24 km roads. Time allowed was 30 minutes, 10 seconds (240 m/min).
  - Phase B: 3.6 km steeplechase. Time allowed was 6 minutes (600 m/min). A penalty of 0.8 points was incurred for each second above that time. A bonus of 0.8 points could be earned for each second under that time, to a maximum of 37.6 points at 5 minutes, 13 seconds (47 seconds under).
  - Phase C: 13.44 km roads. Time allowed was 60 minutes (240 m/min). A penalty of 1 point was incurred for each second above that time.
  - Phase D: 8.1 km cross-country. Time allowed was 18 minutes (450 m/min). A penalty of 0.4 points was incurred for each second above that time. A bonus of 0.4 points could be earned for each second under that time, to a maximum of 90.8 points at 14 minutes, 13 seconds (3 minutes, 47 seconds under).
  - Phase E: 1.98 km flat. Time allowed was 6 minutes (330 m/min). A penalty of 1 point was incurred for each second above that time.
- Jumping: There was an 800-meter jumping test, with a maximum time of 2 minutes. Penalties were incurred for going over the time or for obstacle faults.

== Results ==
73 riders competed.

=== Standings after dressage ===
Rank	Rider	Horse	Nation	Dressage
1	Guy Lefrant	Nicias	France	-70.50
2	Ib Bjorke	Lakaj	Denmark	-73.50
3	Olle Barkander	Emir	Sweden	-77.50
4	Saybattal Mursalimov	Satrap	Soviet Union	-79.00
5	Ottokar Pohlmann	Polarfuchs	United Team of Germany	-81.00
6	Sune Lindback	Armagnac	Sweden	-84.00
7	Konstantin Venkov	Greibel	Bulgaria	-88.00
8	Anton Bühler	Gay-Spark	Switzerland	-89.01
9	Jorge Mathias	Nucleo	Portugal	-92.50
10	Peter Zobel	Neutron	Denmark	-93.51
11	Yury Smyslov	Registratoia	Soviet Union	-94.00
12	Klaus Wagner	Famulus	United Team of Germany	-95.50
13	Jim Elder	Canadian Envoy	Canada	-100.00
14	Hans Johansson	Uran	Sweden	-101.50
15	Norman Arthur	Blue Jeans	Great Britain	-102.00
16	Lev Baklyshkin	Bazis	Soviet Union	-103.50
16	Ignacio Verdura	Desidia	Argentina	-103.50
18	Lawrence Morgan	Salad Days	Australia	-106.00
19	Boris Konkov	Opera	Soviet Union	-107.49
20	Jack Le Goff	Image	France	-108.51
21	Bill Roycroft	Our Solo	Australia	-114.51
22	Fernando Urdapilleta	Febo II	Argentina	-116.01
23	Alvaro Sabbo	Quipar	Portugal	-117.51
24	Ragnar Gustafsson	Dan	Sweden	-118.00
25	Gerhard Schulz	Wanderlilli	United Team of Germany	-119.01
26	J. Michael Plumb	Markham	United States	-120.51
27	Frank Weldon	Samuel Johnson	Great Britain	-122.01
28	Andrzej Kobylinski	Wolborz	Poland	-124.00
29	Neale Lavis	Mirrabooka	Australia	-124.50
29	Giovanni Grignolo	Court Hill	Italy	-124.50
31	Hans Schwarzenbach	Burn-Trout	Switzerland	-125.50
32	Reiner Klimke	Winzerin	United Team of Germany	-126.51
33	Marian Babirecki	Volt	Poland	-127.00
34	Norman Elder	Royal Beaver	Canada	-127.51
35	Michael Bullen	Cottage Romance	Great Britain	-129.00
36	Cesar Madelon	Ceibera	Argentina	-130.50
37	Pierre Durand, Sr.	Gulliano	France	-130.50
38	Rudolf Günthardt	Atraba	Switzerland	-132.51
38	Brian Crago	Sabre	Australia	-132.51
40	Jéhan Le Roy	Garden	France	-133.50
41	Lucio Tasca	Rahin	Italy	-135.00
42	Andrzej Orlos	Krokosz	Poland	-135.51
43	Tony Cameron	Sonnet	Ireland	-136.00
44	Poul Erik Baek	Rolf II	Denmark	-136.50
45	Michael Page	Grasshopper	United States	-137.50
46	Mario Delgado	The Man from Laramie	Portugal	-138.00
47	Grigore Lupancu	Bambus	Romania	-139.00
48	Harry Freeman-Jackson	St. Finbarr	Ireland	-140.01
49	Ian Hume-Dudgeon	Corrigneagh	Ireland	-140.50
49	Frantisek Hruzik	Omen	Czechoslovakia	-140.50
49	Joaquim Silva	Heleboro	Portugal	-140.50
52	Brian Herbinson	Roma	Canada	-142.00
52	David Lurie	Sea Tiger	United States	-142.00
52	Rolf Ruff	Gentleman III	Switzerland	-142.00
55	Carlos Moratorio	Mesonero	Argentina	-143.01
56	Walter Staley	Fleet Captain	United States	-146.01
57	Genko Rashkov	Cratere	Bulgaria	-148.50
58	Eddie Harty	Harlequin	Ireland	-151.50
59	Wilhelm Fleischer	Noniusz	Romania	-153.51
59	Marek Roszczynialski	Wizma	Poland	-153.51
61	Vasil Tsolov	Egoist	Bulgaria	-163.00
62	Jose Centenera	Libramiento	Spain	-167.00
63	Mitko Milushev	Gloria	Bulgaria	-169.00
64	Andrei Cadar	Mures II	Romania	-173.01
65	Bertie Hill	Wild Venture	Great Britain	-174.00
66	Thomas Gayford	Pepper Knowes	Canada	-175.00
66	Antonio Queipo	Noya	Spain	-175.00
68	Arne Preben Jensen	Poker	Denmark	-176.50
69	Lodovico Nava	Arcidosso	Italy	-182.01
70	Oscar Recer	Adjud	Romania	-182.50
71	Alessandro Argenton	Rainbow Bouncer	Italy	-185.01
72	Beltran, Duke de Albuquerque	Dona	Spain	-194.01
73	Enrique Martinez	Peyoba	Spain	-199.50

=== Standings after cross-country ===
Rank	Rider	Horse	Nation	Dressage	Cross-country							Total
Rank	Rider	Horse	Nation	Dressage	Obstacles	Time points					Total	Total
Rank	Rider	Horse	Nation	Dressage	Stage D	Stage B	Stage C	Stage D	Stage E	Total	Total	Total
1	Lawrence Morgan	Salad Days	Australia	-106.00	0	37.60	0.00	90.80	0.00	128.40	128.40	22.40
2	Brian Crago	Sabre	Australia	-132.51	0	37.60	0.00	90.40	0.00	128.00	128.00	-4.51
3	Neale Lavis	Mirrabooka	Australia	-124.50	0	32.80	0.00	75.20	0.00	108.00	108.00	-16.50
4	Hans Schwarzenbach	Burn-Trout	Switzerland	-125.50	0	37.60	0.00	55.20	0.00	92.80	92.80	-32.70
5	Saybattal Mursalimov	Satrap	Soviet Union	-79.00	0	14.40	0.00	31.60	0.00	46.00	46.00	-33.00
6	Anton Bühler	Gay-Spark	Switzerland	-89.01	0	29.60	0.00	21.20	0.00	50.80	50.80	-38.21
7	Jack Le Goff	Image	France	-108.51	0	20.00	0.00	35.60	0.00	55.60	55.60	-52.91
8	Michael Bullen	Cottage Romance	Great Britain	-129.00	0	28.80	0.00	37.60	0.00	66.40	66.40	-62.60
9	Harry Freeman-Jackson	St. Finbarr	Ireland	-140.01	0	34.40	0.00	41.20	0.00	75.60	75.60	-64.41
10	Lev Baklyshkin	Bazis	Soviet Union	-103.50	-20	23.20	0.00	35.20	0.00	58.40	38.40	-65.10
11	Marian Babirecki	Volt	Poland	-127.00	0	26.40	0.00	35.20	0.00	61.60	61.60	-65.40
12	Gerhard Schulz	Wanderlilli	United Team of Germany	-119.01	0	37.60	0.00	-26.40	0.00	11.20	11.20	-107.81
13	Eddie Harty	Harlequin	Ireland	-151.50	0	21.60	0.00	17.60	0.00	39.20	39.20	-112.30
14	Jim Elder	Canadian Envoy	Canada	-100.00	-80	20.00	0.00	45.20	0.00	65.20	-14.80	-114.80
15	Bill Roycroft	Our Solo	Australia	-114.51	-60	37.60	0.00	18.08	0.00	55.68	-4.32	-118.83
16	Lucio Tasca	Rahin	Italy	-135.00	0	26.40	0.00	-17.20	0.00	9.20	9.20	-125.80
17	J. Michael Plumb	Markham	United States	-120.51	-60	5.60	0.00	25.20	0.00	30.80	-29.20	-149.71
18	Reiner Klimke	Winzerin	United Team of Germany	-126.51	0	35.20	0.00	-60.00	0.00	-24.80	-24.80	-151.31
19	Andrzej Orlos	Krokosz	Poland	-135.51	-20	6.40	0.00	-8.40	0.00	-2.00	-22.00	-157.51
20	Ragnar Gustafsson	Dan	Sweden	-118.00	-60	25.60	0.00	-8.40	0.00	17.20	-42.80	-160.80
21	Lodovico Nava	Arcidosso	Italy	-182.01	-20	36.80	-15.00	18.80	0.00	40.60	20.60	-161.41
22	Michael Page	Grasshopper	United States	-137.50	-120	37.60	0.00	57.60	0.00	95.20	-24.80	-162.30
23	Genko Rashkov	Cratere	Bulgaria	-148.50	0	-0.80	0.00	-14.40	0.00	-15.20	-15.20	-163.70
24	Jéhan Le Roy	Garden	France	-133.50	-80	33.60	0.00	5.60	0.00	39.20	-40.80	-174.30
25	Rudolf Günthardt	Atraba	Switzerland	-132.51	-80	15.20	0.00	15.20	0.00	30.40	-49.60	-182.11
26	Norman Arthur	Blue Jeans	Great Britain	-102.00	-80	37.60	0.00	-47.60	0.00	-10.00	-90.00	-192.00
27	Guy Lefrant	Nicias	France	-70.50	-140	14.40	0.00	-2.40	0.00	12.00	-128.00	-198.50
28	Pierre Durand, Sr.	Gulliano	France	-130.50	-140	37.60	0.00	28.80	0.00	66.40	-73.60	-204.10
29	Norman Elder	Royal Beaver	Canada	-127.51	-60	-8.00	0.00	-9.20	0.00	-17.20	-77.20	-204.71
30	Bertie Hill	Wild Venture	Great Britain	-174.00	-120	37.60	0.00	54.80	-14.00	78.40	-41.60	-215.60
31	Giovanni Grignolo	Court Hill	Italy	-124.50	-60	1.60	0.00	-45.60	0.00	-44.00	-104.00	-228.50
32	Tony Cameron	Sonnet	Ireland	-136.00	-120	18.40	0.00	6.80	0.00	25.20	-94.80	-230.80
33	Frank Weldon	Samuel Johnson	Great Britain	-122.01	-200	37.60	0.00	46.60	0.00	84.20	-115.80	-237.81
34	Ib Bjorke	Lakaj	Denmark	-73.50	-200	32.00	0.00	-24.80	0.00	7.20	-192.80	-266.30
35	Cesar Madelon	Ceibera	Argentina	-130.50	-120	-8.80	0.00	-46.00	0.00	-54.80	-174.80	-305.30
36	Ian Hume-Dudgeon	Corrigneagh	Ireland	-140.50	-120	-18.40	0.00	-28.00	0.00	-46.40	-166.40	-306.90
37	Arne Preben Jensen	Poker	Denmark	-176.50	-60	12.00	0.00	-114.00	0.00	-102.00	-162.00	-338.50
38	Vasil Tsolov	Egoist	Bulgaria	-163.00	-60	-13.60	0.00	-112.00	0.00	-125.60	-185.60	-348.60
39	Wilhelm Fleischer	Noniusz	Romania	-153.51	-140	-7.20	0.00	-128.00	0.00	-135.20	-275.20	-428.71
40	Oscar Recer	Adjud	Romania	-182.50	-200	21.60	0.00	-136.40	0.00	-114.80	-314.80	-497.30
41	Mario Delgado	The Man from Laramie	Portugal	-138.00	-428	37.60	0.00	-164.00	0.00	-126.40	-554.40	-692.40
–	Olle Barkander	Emir	Sweden	-77.50	Retired							
–	Ottokar Pohlmann	Polarfuchs	United Team of Germany	-81.00	Retired							
–	Sune Lindback	Armagnac	Sweden	-84.00	Retired							
–	Konstantin Venkov	Greibel	Bulgaria	-88.00	Retired							
–	Jorge Mathias	Nucleo	Portugal	-92.50	Retired							
–	Peter Zobel	Neutron	Denmark	-93.51	Eliminated							
–	Yury Smyslov	Registratoia	Soviet Union	-94.00	Eliminated							
–	Klaus Wagner	Famulus	United Team of Germany	-95.50	Eliminated							
–	Hans Johansson	Uran	Sweden	-101.50	Retired							
–	Ignacio Verdura	Desidia	Argentina	-103.50	Eliminated							
–	Boris Konkov	Opera	Soviet Union	-107.49	Eliminated							
–	Fernando Urdapilleta	Febo II	Argentina	-116.01	Eliminated							
–	Ãlvaro Sabbo	Quipar	Portugal	-117.51	Eliminated							
–	Andrzej Kobylinski	Wolborz	Poland	-124.00	Eliminated							
–	Poul Erik Baek	Rolf II	Denmark	-136.50	Retired							
–	Grigore Lupancu	Bambus	Romania	-139.00	Eliminated							
–	Frantisek Hruzik	Omen	Czechoslovakia	-140.50	Eliminated							
–	Joaquim Silva	Heleboro	Portugal	-140.50	Retired							
–	Brian Herbinson	Roma	Canada	-142.00	Eliminated							
–	David Lurie	Sea Tiger	United States	-142.00	Eliminated							
–	Rolf Ruff	Gentleman III	Switzerland	-142.00	Eliminated							
–	Carlos Moratorio	Mesonero	Argentina	-143.01	Eliminated							
–	Walter Staley	Fleet Captain	United States	-146.01	Eliminated							
–	Marek Roszczynialski	Wizma	Poland	-153.51	Eliminated							
–	Jose Centenera	Libramiento	Spain	-167.00	Eliminated							
–	Mitko Milushev	Gloria	Bulgaria	-169.00	Retired							
–	Andrei Cadar	Mures II	Romania	-173.01	Eliminated							
–	Thomas Gayford	Pepper Knowes	Canada	-175.00	Eliminated							
–	Antonio Queipo	Noya	Spain	-175.00	Retired							
–	Alessandro Argenton	Rainbow Bouncer	Italy	-185.01	Eliminated							
–	Beltran, Duke de Albuquerque	Dona	Spain	-194.01	Retired							
–	Enrique Martinez	Peyoba	Spain	-199.50	Eliminated							

=== Final results after jumping ===
Rank	Rider	Horse	Nation	Dressage	Cross-country	Jumping			Total
Rank	Rider	Horse	Nation	Dressage	Cross-country	Points		Total	Total
Rank	Rider	Horse	Nation	Dressage	Cross-country	Obstacles	Time	Total	Total
1st place, gold medalist(s)	Lawrence Morgan	Salad Days	Australia	-106.00	128.40	-10	-5.25	-15.25	7.15
2nd place, silver medalist(s)	Neale Lavis	Mirrabooka	Australia	-124.50	108.00	0	0	0	-16.50
3rd place, bronze medalist(s)	Anton Bühler	Gay-Spark	Switzerland	-89.01	50.80	-10	-3	-13	-51.21
4	Michael Bullen	Cottage Romance	Great Britain	-129.00	66.40	0	0	0	-62.60
5	Saybattal Mursalimov	Satrap	Soviet Union	-79.00	46.00	-30	-0.75	-30.75	-63.75
6	Jack Le Goff	Image	France	-108.51	55.60	-20	0	-20	-72.91
7	Lev Baklyshkin	Bazis	Soviet Union	-103.50	38.40	-20	-0.25	-20.25	-85.35
8	Marian Babirecki	Volt	Poland	-127.00	61.60	-20	0	-20	-85.40
9	Eddie Harty	Harlequin	Ireland	-151.50	39.20	0	0	0	-112.30
10	Jim Elder	Canadian Envoy	Canada	-100.00	-14.80	0	-0.5	-0.5	-115.30
11	Bill Roycroft	Our Solo	Australia	-114.51	-4.32	0	0	0	-118.83
12	Lucio Tasca	Rahin	Italy	-135.00	9.20	0	0	0	-125.80
13	Hans Schwarzenbach	Burn-Trout	Switzerland	-125.50	92.80	-90	-8.75	-98.75	-131.45
14	Gerhard Schulz	Wanderlilli	United Team of Germany	-119.01	11.20	-40	-1.5	-41.5	-149.31
15	J. Michael Plumb	Markham	United States	-120.51	-29.20	0	-3.25	-3.25	-152.96
16	Lodovico Nava	Arcidosso	Italy	-182.01	20.60	0	-0.5	-0.5	-161.91
17	Michael Page	Grasshopper	United States	-137.50	-24.80	-10	0	-10	-172.30
18	Reiner Klimke	Winzerin	United Team of Germany	-126.51	-24.80	-20	-2	-22	-173.31
19	Genko Rashkov	Cratere	Bulgaria	-148.50	-15.20	-30	-4.75	-34.75	-198.45
20	Rudolf Günthardt	Atraba	Switzerland	-132.51	-49.60	-20	-1.25	-21.25	-203.36
21	Guy Lefrant	Nicias	France	-70.50	-128.00	-10	0	-10	-208.50
22	Bertie Hill	Wild Venture	Great Britain	-174.00	-41.60	0	0	0	-215.60
23	Jéhan Le Roy	Garden	France	-133.50	-40.80	-60	0	-60	-234.30
24	Norman Elder	Royal Beaver	Canada	-127.51	-77.20	-30	-0.75	-30.75	-235.46
25	Frank Weldon	Samuel Johnson	Great Britain	-122.01	-115.80	0	0	0	-237.81
26	Giovanni Grignolo	Court Hill	Italy	-124.50	-104.00	-10	-2	-12	-240.50
27	Tony Cameron	Sonnet	Ireland	-136.00	-94.80	-20	-0.75	-20.75	-251.55
28	Ib Bjørke	Lakaj	Denmark	-73.50	-192.80	-10	0	-10	-276.30
29	César Madelón	Ceibera	Argentina	-130.50	-174.80	0	-2	-2	-307.30
30	Ian Hume-Dudgeon	Corrigneagh	Ireland	-140.50	-166.40	0	-3.25	-3.25	-310.15
31	Vasil Tsolov	Egoist	Bulgaria	-163.00	-185.60	-20	-2.75	-22.75	-371.35
32	Arne Preben Jensen	Poker	Denmark	-176.50	-162.00	-30	-12	-42	-380.50
33	Wilhelm Fleischer	Noniusz	Romania	-153.51	-275.20	-10	0	-10	-438.71
34	Oscar Recer	Adjud	Romania	-182.50	-314.80	-10	-2.25	-12.25	-509.55
35	Mário Delgado	The Man from Laramie	Portugal	-138.00	-554.40	-10	-2.75	-12.75	-705.15
–	Brian Crago	Sabre	Australia	-132.51	128.00	Retired			
–	Harry Freeman-Jackson	St. Finbarr	Ireland	-140.01	-75.60	Eliminated			
–	Andrzej Orłoś	Krokosz	Poland	-135.51	-22.00	Eliminated			
–	Ragnar Gustafsson	Dan	Sweden	-118.00	-42.80	Retired			
–	Norman Arthur	Blue Jeans	Great Britain	-102.00	-90.00	Retired			
–	Pierre Durand Sr.	Gulliano	France	-130.50	-73.60	Retired			
–	Olle Barkander	Emir	Sweden	-77.50	Retired				
–	Ottokar Pohlmann	Polarfuchs	United Team of Germany	-81.00	Retired				
–	Sune Lindbäck	Armagnac	Sweden	-84.00	Retired				
–	Konstantin Venkov	Greibel	Bulgaria	-88.00	Retired				
–	Jorge Mathias	Nucleo	Portugal	-92.50	Retired				
–	Peter Zobel	Neutron	Denmark	-93.51	Eliminated				
–	Yury Smyslov	Registratoia	Soviet Union	-94.00	Eliminated				
–	Klaus Wagner	Famulus	United Team of Germany	-95.50	Eliminated				
–	Hans Johansson	Uran	Sweden	-101.50	Retired				
–	Ignacio Verdura	Desidia	Argentina	-103.50	Eliminated				
–	Boris Konkov	Opera	Soviet Union	-107.49	Eliminated				
–	Fernando Urdapilleta	Febo II	Argentina	-116.01	Eliminated				
–	Ãlvaro Sabbo	Quipar	Portugal	-117.51	Eliminated				
–	Andrzej Kobyliński	Wolborz	Poland	-124.00	Eliminated				
–	Poul Erik Bæk	Rolf II	Denmark	-136.50	Retired				
–	Grigore Lupancu	Bambus	Romania	-139.00	Eliminated				
–	František Hrúzik	Omen	Czechoslovakia	-140.50	Eliminated				
–	Joaquim Silva	Heleboro	Portugal	-140.50	Retired				
–	Brian Herbinson	Roma	Canada	-142.00	Eliminated				
–	David Lurie	Sea Tiger	United States	-142.00	Eliminated				
–	Rolf Ruff	Gentleman III	Switzerland	-142.00	Eliminated				
–	Carlos Moratorio	Mesonero	Argentina	-143.01	Eliminated				
–	Walter Staley	Fleet Captain	United States	-146.01	Eliminated				
–	Marek Roszczynialski	Wizma	Poland	-153.51	Eliminated				
–	José Centenera	Libramiento	Spain	-167.00	Eliminated				
–	Mitko Milushev	Gloria	Bulgaria	-169.00	Retired				
–	Andrei Cadar	Mures II	Romania	-173.01	Eliminated				
–	Thomas Gayford	Pepper Knowes	Canada	-175.00	Eliminated				
–	Antonio Queipo	Noya	Spain	-175.00	Retired				
–	Alessandro Argenton	Rainbow Bouncer	Italy	-185.01	Eliminated				
–	Beltran, Duke de Albuquerque	Dona	Spain	-194.01	Retired				
–	Enrique Martínez	Peyoba	Spain	-199.50	Eliminated				
