= Equestrian at the 1960 Summer Olympics – Team eventing =

Team eventing at the Games of the XVII Olympiad
- Venue: Villa Borghese gardens; Rocca di Papa; Stadio Olimpico
- Date: 6–10 September 1960
- Competitors: 72 from 18 nations

Medalists
1st place, gold medalist(s)		Lawrence Morgan; Neale Lavis; Bill Roycroft	Australia
2nd place, silver medalist(s)		Anton Bühler; Hans Schwarzenbach; Rudolf Günthardt	Switzerland
3rd place, bronze medalist(s)		Jack Le Goff; Guy Lefrant; Jéhan Le Roy	France

The team eventing at the 1960 Summer Olympics took place between 6 and 10 September. Eventing was open to men only. It was the 10th appearance of the event.

For the first time since 1924, the eventing team consisted of 4 riders rather than 3. 18 nations, with a total of 72 riders, competed. The eventing competition at the 1960 Olympics clearly went to the Australians. The team had fantastic performances cross-country, with three of the four riders (Lawrence "Laurie" Morgan, Neale Lavis, and Brian Crago) in the top three spots of the competition following endurance day. Bill Roycroft, the fourth Australian team member, had fallen on cement drain pipes, resulting in a concussion and broken collar bone. Unfortunately, Brian Crago's mount Sabre was rejected at the final horse inspection, removing him from his current silver-medal position. In order to insure his team finished, Roycroft left the hospital to ride in the final phase, posting a clear round and insuring a team gold for his country.

== Competition format ==
The team and individual eventing competitions used the same results. Eventing consisted of a dressage test, a cross-country test, and a jumping test. The best three total individual scores counted for the team score; any team that did not have at least three members finish the competition was eliminated.

- Dressage: The eventing competition featured a dressage test.
- Cross-country: The cross-country test had five phases.
  - Phase A: 7.24 km roads. Time allowed was 30 minutes, 10 seconds (240 m/min).
  - Phase B: 3.6 km steeplechase. Time allowed was 6 minutes (600 m/min). A penalty of 0.8 points was incurred for each second above that time. A bonus of 0.8 points could be earned for each second under that time, to a maximum of 37.6 points at 5 minutes, 13 seconds (47 seconds under).
  - Phase C: 13.44 km roads. Time allowed was 60 minutes (240 m/min). A penalty of 1 point was incurred for each second above that time.
  - Phase D: 8.1 km cross-country. Time allowed was 18 minutes (450 m/min). A penalty of 0.4 points was incurred for each second above that time. A bonus of 0.4 points could be earned for each second under that time, to a maximum of 90.8 points at 14 minutes, 13 seconds (3 minutes, 47 seconds under).
  - Phase E: 1.98 km flat. Time allowed was 6 minutes (330 m/min). A penalty of 1 point was incurred for each second above that time.
- Jumping: There was an 800-meter jumping test, with a maximum time of 2 minutes. Penalties were incurred for going over the time or for obstacle faults.

== Results ==
18 teams, totaling 72 riders, competed.

=== Standings after dressage ===
Rank	Nation	Individual results			Team result
Rank	Nation	Rider	Horse	Dressage	Team result
1	Sweden	Olle Barkander	Emir	−77.50	−263.00
1	Sweden	Sune Lindback	Armagnac	−84.00	−263.00
1	Sweden	Hans Johansson	Uran	−101.50	−263.00
1	Sweden	Ragnar Gustafsson	Dan	~~−118.00~~	−263.00
2	Soviet Union	Saybattal Mursalimov	Satrap	−79.00	−276.50
2	Soviet Union	Yury Smyslov	Registratoia	−94.00	−276.50
2	Soviet Union	Lev Baklyshkin	Bazis	−103.50	−276.50
2	Soviet Union	Boris Konkov	Opera	~~−107.49~~	−276.50
3	United Team of Germany	Ottokar Pohlmann	Polarfuchs	−81.00	−295.51
3	United Team of Germany	Klaus Wagner	Famulus	−95.50	−295.51
3	United Team of Germany	Gerhard Schulz	Wanderlilli	−119.01	−295.51
3	United Team of Germany	Reiner Klimke	Winzerin	~~−126.51~~	−295.51
4	Denmark	Ib Bjorke	Lakaj	−73.50	−303.51
4	Denmark	Peter Zobel	Neutron	−93.51	−303.51
4	Denmark	Poul Erik Baek	Rolf II	−136.50	−303.51
4	Denmark	Arne Preben Jensen	Poker	~~−176.50~~	−303.51
5	France	Guy Lefrant	Nicias	−70.50	−309.51
5	France	Jack Le Goff	Image	−108.51	−309.51
5	France	Pierre Durand, Sr.	Gulliano	−130.50	−309.51
5	France	Jéhan Le Roy	Garden	~~−133.50~~	−309.51
6	Australia	Lawrence Morgan	Salad Days	−106.00	−345.01
6	Australia	Bill Roycroft	Our Solo	−114.51	−345.01
6	Australia	Neale Lavis	Mirrabooka	−124.50	−345.01
6	Australia	Brian Crago	Sabre	~~−132.51~~	−345.01
7	Switzerland	Anton Bühler	Gay-Spark	−89.01	−347.02
7	Switzerland	Hans Schwarzenbach	Burn-Trout	−125.50	−347.02
7	Switzerland	Rudolf Günthardt	Atraba	−132.51	−347.02
7	Switzerland	Rolf Ruff	Gentleman III	~~−142.00~~	−347.02
8	Portugal	Jorge Mathias	Nucleo	−92.50	−348.01
8	Portugal	Ãlvaro Sabbo	Quipar	−117.51	−348.01
8	Portugal	Mario Delgado	The Man from Laramie	−138.00	−348.01
8	Portugal	Joaquim Silva	Heleboro	~~−140.50~~	−348.01
9	Argentina	Ignacio Verdura	Desidia	−103.50	−350.01
9	Argentina	Fernando Urdapilleta	Febo II	−116.01	−350.01
9	Argentina	Cesar Madelon	Ceibera	−130.50	−350.01
9	Argentina	Carlos Moratorio	Mesonero	~~−143.01~~	−350.01
10	Great Britain	Norman Arthur	Blue Jeans	−102.00	−353.01
10	Great Britain	Frank Weldon	Samuel Johnson	−122.01	−353.01
10	Great Britain	Michael Bullen	Cottage Romance	−129.00	−353.01
10	Great Britain	Bertie Hill	Wild Venture	~~−174.00~~	−353.01
11	Canada	Jim Elder	Canadian Envoy	−100.00	−369.51
11	Canada	Norman Elder	Royal Beaver	−127.51	−369.51
11	Canada	Brian Herbinson	Roma	−142.00	−369.51
11	Canada	Thomas Gayford	Pepper Knowes	~~−175.00~~	−369.51
12	Poland	Andrzej Kobylinski	Wolborz	−124.00	−386.51
12	Poland	Marian Babirecki	Volt	−127.00	−386.51
12	Poland	Andrzej Orlos	Krokosz	−135.51	−386.51
12	Poland	Marek Roszczynialski	Wizma	~~−153.51~~	−386.51
13	Bulgaria	Konstantin Venkov	Greibel	−88.00	−399.50
13	Bulgaria	Genko Rashkov	Cratere	−148.50	−399.50
13	Bulgaria	Vasil Tsolov	Egoist	−163.00	−399.50
13	Bulgaria	Mitko Milushev	Gloria	~~−169.00~~	−399.50
14	United States	J. Michael Plumb	Markham	−120.51	−400.01
14	United States	Michael Page	Grasshopper	−137.50	−400.01
14	United States	David Lurie	Sea Tiger	−142.00	−400.01
14	United States	Walter Staley	Fleet Captain	~~−146.01~~	−400.01
15	Ireland	Tony Cameron	Sonnet	−136.00	−416.51
15	Ireland	Ian Hume-Dudgeon	Corrigneagh	−140.50	−416.51
15	Ireland	Harry Freeman-Jackson	St. Finbarr	−140.01	−416.51
15	Ireland	Eddie Harty	Harlequin	~~−151.50~~	−416.51
16	Italy	Giovanni Grignolo	Court Hill	−124.50	−441.51
16	Italy	Lucio Tasca	Rahin	−135.00	−441.51
16	Italy	Lodovico Nava	Arcidosso	−182.01	−441.51
16	Italy	Alessandro Argenton	Rainbow Bouncer	~~−185.01~~	−441.51
17	Romania	Grigore Lupancu	Bambus	−139.00	−465.52
17	Romania	Wilhelm Fleischer	Noniusz	−153.51	−465.52
17	Romania	Andrei Cadar	Mures II	−173.01	−465.52
17	Romania	Oscar Recer	Adjud	~~−182.50~~	−465.52
18	Spain	Jose Centenera	Libramiento	−167.00	−536.01
18	Spain	Antonio Queipo	Noya	−175.00	−536.01
18	Spain	Beltran, Duke de Albuquerque	Dona	−194.01	−536.01
18	Spain	Enrique Martinez	Peyoba	~~−199.50~~	−536.01

=== Standings after cross-country ===
Rank	Nation	Individual results					Team result
Rank	Nation	Rider	Horse	Dressage	Cross-country	Total	Team result
1	Australia	Lawrence Morgan	Salad Days	−106.00	128.40	22.40	1.39
1	Australia	Brian Crago	Sabre	−132.51	128.00	−4.51	1.39
1	Australia	Neale Lavis	Mirrabooka	−124.50	108.00	−16.50	1.39
1	Australia	Bill Roycroft	Our Solo	−114.51	−4.32	~~−118.83~~	1.39
2	Switzerland	Hans Schwarzenbach	Burn-Trout	−125.50	92.80	−32.70	−253.01
2	Switzerland	Anton Bühler	Gay-Spark	−89.01	50.80	−38.21	−253.01
2	Switzerland	Rudolf Günthardt	Atraba	−132.51	−49.60	−182.11	−253.01
2	Switzerland	Rolf Ruff	Gentleman III	−142.00	Eliminated		−253.01
3	Ireland	Harry Freeman-Jackson	St. Finbarr	−140.01	75.60	−64.41	−407.51
3	Ireland	Eddie Harty	Harlequin	−151.50	39.20	−112.30	−407.51
3	Ireland	Tony Cameron	Sonnet	−136.00	−94.80	−230.80	−407.51
3	Ireland	Ian Hume-Dudgeon	Corrigneagh	−140.50	−166.40	~~−306.90~~	−407.51
4	France	Jack Le Goff	Image	−108.51	55.60	−52.91	−425.71
4	France	Jéhan Le Roy	Garden	−133.50	−40.80	−174.30	−425.71
4	France	Guy Lefrant	Nicias	−70.50	−128.00	−198.50	−425.71
4	France	Pierre Durand, Sr.	Gulliano	−130.50	−73.60	~~−204.10~~	−425.71
5	Great Britain	Michael Bullen	Cottage Romance	−129.00	66.40	−62.60	−470.20
5	Great Britain	Norman Arthur	Blue Jeans	−102.00	−90.00	−192.00	−470.20
5	Great Britain	Bertie Hill	Wild Venture	−174.00	−41.60	−215.60	−470.20
5	Great Britain	Frank Weldon	Samuel Johnson	−122.01	−115.80	~~−237.81~~	−470.20
6	Italy	Lucio Tasca	Rahin	−135.00	9.20	−125.80	−515.71
6	Italy	Lodovico Nava	Arcidosso	−182.01	20.60	−161.41	−515.71
6	Italy	Giovanni Grignolo	Court Hill	−124.50	−104.00	−228.50	−515.71
6	Italy	Alessandro Argenton	Rainbow Bouncer	−185.01	Eliminated		−515.71
–	Soviet Union	Saybattal Mursalimov	Satrap	−79.00	46.00	−33.00	Eliminated
–	Soviet Union	Lev Baklyshkin	Bazis	−103.50	38.40	−65.10	Eliminated
–	Soviet Union	Yury Smyslov	Registratoia	−94.00	Eliminated		Eliminated
–	Soviet Union	Boris Konkov	Opera	−107.49	Eliminated		Eliminated
–	Poland	Marian Babirecki	Volt	−127.00	61.60	−65.40	Eliminated
–	Poland	Andrzej Orlos	Krokosz	−135.51	−22.00	−157.51	Eliminated
–	Poland	Andrzej Kobylinski	Wolborz	−124.00	Eliminated		Eliminated
–	Poland	Marek Roszczynialski	Wizma	−153.51	Eliminated		Eliminated
–	United Team of Germany	Gerhard Schulz	Wanderlilli	−119.01	11.20	−107.81	Eliminated
–	United Team of Germany	Reiner Klimke	Winzerin	−126.51	−24.80	−151.31	Eliminated
–	United Team of Germany	Ottokar Pohlmann	Polarfuchs	−81.00	Retired		Eliminated
–	United Team of Germany	Klaus Wagner	Famulus	−95.50	Eliminated		Eliminated
–	United States	J. Michael Plumb	Markham	−120.51	−29.20	−149.71	Eliminated
–	United States	Michael Page	Grasshopper	−137.50	−24.80	−162.30	Eliminated
–	United States	David Lurie	Sea Tiger	−142.00	Eliminated		Eliminated
–	United States	Walter Staley	Fleet Captain	−146.01	Eliminated		Eliminated
–	Canada	Jim Elder	Canadian Envoy	−100.00	−14.80	−114.80	Eliminated
–	Canada	Norman Elder	Royal Beaver	−127.51	−77.20	−204.71	Eliminated
–	Canada	Brian Herbinson	Roma	−142.00	Eliminated		Eliminated
–	Canada	Thomas Gayford	Pepper Knowes	−175.00	Eliminated		Eliminated
–	Bulgaria	Genko Rashkov	Cratere	−148.50	−15.20	−163.70	Eliminated
–	Bulgaria	Vasil Tsolov	Egoist	−163.00	−185.60	−348.60	Eliminated
–	Bulgaria	Konstantin Venkov	Greibel	−88.00	Retired		Eliminated
–	Bulgaria	Mitko Milushev	Gloria	−169.00	Retired		Eliminated
–	Denmark	Ib Bjorke	Lakaj	−73.50	−192.80	−266.30	Eliminated
–	Denmark	Arne Preben Jensen	Poker	−176.50	−162.00	−338.50	Eliminated
–	Denmark	Peter Zobel	Neutron	−93.51	Eliminated		Eliminated
–	Denmark	Poul Erik Baek	Rolf II	−136.50	Retired		Eliminated
–	Romania	Wilhelm Fleischer	Noniusz	−153.51	−275.20	−428.71	Eliminated
–	Romania	Oscar Recer	Adjud	−182.50	−314.80	−497.30	Eliminated
–	Romania	Grigore Lupancu	Bambus	−139.00	Eliminated		Eliminated
–	Romania	Andrei Cadar	Mures II	−173.01	Eliminated		Eliminated
–	Sweden	Ragnar Gustafsson	Dan	−118.00	−42.80	−160.80	Eliminated
–	Sweden	Olle Barkander	Emir	−77.50	Retired		Eliminated
–	Sweden	Sune Lindback	Armagnac	−84.00	Retired		Eliminated
–	Sweden	Hans Johansson	Uran	−101.50	Retired		Eliminated
–	Argentina	Cesar Madelon	Ceibera	−130.50	−174.80	−305.30	Eliminated
–	Argentina	Ignacio Verdura	Desidia	−103.50	Eliminated		Eliminated
–	Argentina	Fernando Urdapilleta	Febo II	−116.01	Eliminated		Eliminated
–	Argentina	Carlos Moratorio	Mesonero	−143.01	Eliminated		Eliminated
–	Portugal	Mario Delgado	The Man from Laramie	−138.00	−554.40	−692.40	Eliminated
–	Portugal	Jorge Mathias	Nucleo	−92.50	Retired		Eliminated
–	Portugal	Ãlvaro Sabbo	Quipar	−117.51	Eliminated		Eliminated
–	Portugal	Joaquim Silva	Heleboro	−140.50	Retired		Eliminated
–	Spain	Jose Centenera	Libramiento	−167.00	Eliminated		Eliminated
–	Spain	Antonio Queipo	Noya	−175.00	Retired		Eliminated
–	Spain	Beltran, Duke de Albuquerque	Dona	−194.01	Retired		Eliminated
–	Spain	Enrique Martinez	Peyoba	−199.50	Eliminated		Eliminated

=== Final results after jumping ===
Rank	Nation	Individual results						Team result
Rank	Nation	Rider	Horse	Dressage	Cross-country	Jumping	Total	Team result
1st place, gold medalist(s)	Australia	Lawrence Morgan	Salad Days	−106.00	128.40	−15.25	7.15	−128.18
1st place, gold medalist(s)	Australia	Neale Lavis	Mirrabooka	−124.50	108.00	0	−16.50	−128.18
1st place, gold medalist(s)	Australia	Bill Roycroft	Our Solo	−114.51	−4.32	0	−118.83	−128.18
1st place, gold medalist(s)	Australia	Brian Crago	Sabre	−132.51	128.00	Retired		−128.18
2nd place, silver medalist(s)	Switzerland	Anton Bühler	Gay-Spark	−89.01	50.80	−13.00	−51.21	−386.02
2nd place, silver medalist(s)	Switzerland	Hans Schwarzenbach	Burn-Trout	−125.50	92.80	−98.75	−131.45	−386.02
2nd place, silver medalist(s)	Switzerland	Rudolf Günthardt	Atraba	−132.51	−49.60	−21.25	−203.36	−386.02
2nd place, silver medalist(s)	Switzerland	Rolf Ruff	Gentleman III	−142.00	Eliminated			−386.02
3rd place, bronze medalist(s)	France	Jack Le Goff	Image	−108.51	55.60	−20.00	−72.91	−515.71
3rd place, bronze medalist(s)	France	Guy Lefrant	Nicias	−70.50	−128.00	−10.00	−208.50	−515.71
3rd place, bronze medalist(s)	France	Jéhan Le Roy	Garden	−133.50	−40.80	−60.00	−234.30	−515.71
3rd place, bronze medalist(s)	France	Pierre Durand, Sr.	Gulliano	−130.50	−73.60	Retired		−515.71
4	Great Britain	Michael Bullen	Cottage Romance	−129.00	66.40	0	−62.60	−516.21
4	Great Britain	Bertie Hill	Wild Venture	−174.00	−41.60	0	−215.60	−516.21
4	Great Britain	Frank Weldon	Samuel Johnson	−122.01	−115.80	0	−237.81	−516.21
4	Great Britain	Norman Arthur	Blue Jeans	−102.00	−90.00	Retired		−516.21
5	Italy	Lucio Tasca	Rahin	−135.00	9.20	0	−125.80	−528.21
5	Italy	Lodovico Nava	Arcidosso	−182.01	20.60	−0.50	−161.91	−528.21
5	Italy	Giovanni Grignolo	Court Hill	−124.50	−104.00	−12.00	−240.50	−528.21
5	Italy	Alessandro Argenton	Rainbow Bouncer	−185.01	Eliminated			−528.21
6	Ireland	Eddie Harty	Harlequin	−151.50	39.20	0	−112.30	−407.51
6	Ireland	Tony Cameron	Sonnet	−136.00	−94.80	−20.75	−251.55	−407.51
6	Ireland	Ian Hume-Dudgeon	Corrigneagh	−140.50	−166.40	−3.25	−310.15	−407.51
6	Ireland	Harry Freeman-Jackson	St. Finbarr	−140.01	75.60	Eliminated		−407.51
–	Soviet Union	Saybattal Mursalimov	Satrap	−79.00	46.00	−30.75	−63.75	Eliminated
–	Soviet Union	Lev Baklyshkin	Bazis	−103.50	38.40	−20.25	−85.35	Eliminated
–	Soviet Union	Yury Smyslov	Registratoia	−94.00	Eliminated			Eliminated
–	Soviet Union	Boris Konkov	Opera	−107.49	Eliminated			Eliminated
–	United Team of Germany	Gerhard Schulz	Wanderlilli	−119.01	11.20	−41.5	−149.31	Eliminated
–	United Team of Germany	Reiner Klimke	Winzerin	−126.51	−24.80	−22.00	−173.31	Eliminated
–	United Team of Germany	Ottokar Pohlmann	Polarfuchs	−81.00	Retired			Eliminated
–	United Team of Germany	Klaus Wagner	Famulus	−95.50	Eliminated			Eliminated
–	United States	J. Michael Plumb	Markham	−120.51	−29.20	−3.25	−152.96	Eliminated
–	United States	Michael Page	Grasshopper	−137.50	−24.80	−10.00	−172.30	Eliminated
–	United States	David Lurie	Sea Tiger	−142.00	Eliminated			Eliminated
–	United States	Walter Staley	Fleet Captain	−146.01	Eliminated			Eliminated
–	Canada	Jim Elder	Canadian Envoy	−100.00	−14.80	−0.50	−115.30	Eliminated
–	Canada	Norman Elder	Royal Beaver	−127.51	−77.20	−30.75	−235.46	Eliminated
–	Canada	Brian Herbinson	Roma	−142.00	Eliminated			Eliminated
–	Canada	Thomas Gayford	Pepper Knowes	−175.00	Eliminated			Eliminated
–	Bulgaria	Genko Rashkov	Cratere	−148.50	−15.20	−34.75	−198.45	Eliminated
–	Bulgaria	Vasil Tsolov	Egoist	−163.00	−185.60	−22.75	−371.35	Eliminated
–	Bulgaria	Konstantin Venkov	Greibel	−88.00	Retired			Eliminated
–	Bulgaria	Mitko Milushev	Gloria	−169.00	Retired			Eliminated
–	Denmark	Ib Bjorke	Lakaj	−73.50	−192.80	−10.00	−276.30	Eliminated
–	Denmark	Arne Preben Jensen	Poker	−176.50	−162.00	−42.00	−380.50	Eliminated
–	Denmark	Peter Zobel	Neutron	−93.51	Eliminated			Eliminated
–	Denmark	Poul Erik Baek	Rolf II	−136.50	Retired			Eliminated
–	Romania	Wilhelm Fleischer	Noniusz	−153.51	−275.20	−10.00	−438.71	Eliminated
–	Romania	Oscar Recer	Adjud	−182.50	−314.80	−12.25	−509.55	Eliminated
–	Romania	Grigore Lupancu	Bambus	−139.00	Eliminated			Eliminated
–	Romania	Andrei Cadar	Mures II	−173.01	Eliminated			Eliminated
–	Poland	Marian Babirecki	Volt	−127.00	61.60	−20.00	−85.40	Eliminated
–	Poland	Andrzej Orlos	Krokosz	−135.51	−22.00	Eliminated		Eliminated
–	Poland	Andrzej Kobylinski	Wolborz	−124.00	Eliminated			Eliminated
–	Poland	Marek Roszczynialski	Wizma	−153.51	Eliminated			Eliminated
–	Argentina	Cesar Madelon	Ceibera	−130.50	−174.80	−2.00	−307.30	Eliminated
–	Argentina	Ignacio Verdura	Desidia	−103.50	Eliminated			Eliminated
–	Argentina	Fernando Urdapilleta	Febo II	−116.01	Eliminated			Eliminated
–	Argentina	Carlos Moratorio	Mesonero	−143.01	Eliminated			Eliminated
–	Portugal	Mario Delgado	The Man from Laramie	−138.00	−554.40	−12.75	−705.15	Eliminated
–	Portugal	Jorge Mathias	Nucleo	−92.50	Retired			Eliminated
–	Portugal	Ãlvaro Sabbo	Quipar	−117.51	Eliminated			Eliminated
–	Portugal	Joaquim Silva	Heleboro	−140.50	Retired			Eliminated
–	Sweden	Ragnar Gustafsson	Dan	−118.00	−42.80	Retired		Eliminated
–	Sweden	Olle Barkander	Emir	−77.50	Retired			Eliminated
–	Sweden	Sune Lindback	Armagnac	−84.00	Retired			Eliminated
–	Sweden	Hans Johansson	Uran	−101.50	Retired			Eliminated
–	Spain	Jose Centenera	Libramiento	−167.00	Eliminated			Eliminated
–	Spain	Antonio Queipo	Noya	−175.00	Retired			Eliminated
–	Spain	Beltran, Duke de Albuquerque	Dona	−194.01	Retired			Eliminated
–	Spain	Enrique Martinez	Peyoba	−199.50	Eliminated			Eliminated
