= Argentina at the 1960 Summer Olympics =

- IOC code: ARG
- NOC: Argentine Olympic Committee

in Rome
- Competitors: 92 in 14 sports
- Flag bearer: Cristina Hardekopf
- Medals Ranked 30th: Gold 0 Silver 1 Bronze 1 Total 2

Summer Olympics appearances (overview)
- 1900; 1904; 1908; 1912; 1920; 1924; 1928; 1932; 1936; 1948; 1952; 1956; 1960; 1964; 1968; 1972; 1976; 1980; 1984; 1988; 1992; 1996; 2000; 2004; 2008; 2012; 2016; 2020; 2024; 2028

Argentina at the 1960 Summer Olympics in Rome, Italy was the eleventh appearance out of fourteen editions of the 1960 Summer Olympics. Argentina sent to the 1960 Summer Olympics its eighth national team, under the auspices of the Argentine Olympic Committee (Comité Olímpico Argentino), 91 athletes (all men), something which had not happened since the 1932 Games in Los Angeles and which has not happened since. Ironically, the flag bearer, a woman named Cristina Hardekopf, was a diver but was not included in the delegation as a participating athlete. However, Jorge Somlay, a rower, participated as Argentina's youngest Olympic competitor at only 13 years old.

The Olympic team won two medals, one bronze and one silver, and five Olympic diplomas. They placed 27th in total medal count over 83 participating countries.

The silver medal was one in yachting and the bronze in boxing, giving Argentina half of its medals and 3 out of five of its Olympic Diplomas (something which was usual until the 1968 Summer Olympics in Mexico City).

Argentina's performance in the games forms part of a period of scarce results, which was affected by scarce support for the Olympic Games by the state as well as other political reasons. Repeating what happened in the 1956 Games in Melbourne, Argentina did not win a single gold medal, and the two medals that they did win were far below their average winnings of 4-7 medals in all of the games from 1924 to 1952. In 2004 Argentina's Olympic success recovered to the levels it had during the 1924-1952 period.

== Medalists ==
Medal	Name	Sport	Event	Date
Silver	Héctor Calegaris; Jorge del Río Salas; Jorge Salas Chávez	Sailing	Men's Dragon	September 3
Bronze	Abel Laudonio	Boxing	Men's lightweight	September 7

== Athletics ==
Athletes	Events	Final	
Athletes	Events	Result	Rank
Osvaldo Suárez	Men's marathon	2:21.26.6	9
Gumersindo Gómez	Men's marathon	2:23.00.0	15
Walter Lemos	Men's marathon	2:36.55.0	50
Guillermo Weller	Men's 50km walk	DSQ	

== Boxing ==
Athlete	Category	Round of 32	Round of 16	Round of 8	Quarterfinals	Semifinals	Final	
Athlete	Category	Opposition Result	Opposition Result	Opposition Result	Opposition Result	Opposition Result	Opposition Result	Rank
Miguel Angel Botta	Flyweight	Bye	Macalalad (PHI); W 3–2	Illkhanouf (IRI); W default	Török (HUN); L 0–5	did not advance		
Carlos Cañete	Bantamweight	Bye	Haga (JPN); L 0–5	did not advance				
Carlos Aro	Featherweight	-	Baranyai (HUN); W 4–0–1	Nikanorov (URS); L 1–0–4	did not advance			
Abel Laudonio	Lightweight	Bye	Töre (TCH); W 5–0	Næss (NOR); W TKO	Barannikov (URS); W 5–0	Lopopolo (ITA); L 1–1–3	Did not advance	3rd place, bronze medalist(s)
Luis Aranda	Light Welterweight	Bye	Reyes (MEX); W 4–1	Brandi (ITA); L 1–0–4	did not advance			
Aurelio González	Welterweight	Bye	Mitsev (BUL); L 1–2–2	did not advance				
Celedonio Lima	Light Middleweight	-	Bye	Alleyne (CAN); W TKO	McClure (USA); L 1–1–3	did not advance		
Rodolfo Loza	Middleweight	-	Lucas (CHI); L 1–1–3	did not advance				
Rafael Gargiulo	Light Heavyweight	-	Bye	Leite (BRA); W TKO	Saraudi (ITA); L 2–3	did not advance		
Eduardo Corletti	Heavyweight	-	Bye	Sretenović (YUG); L 1–4	did not advance			

== Cycling ==
=== Road ===
Athlete	Event	Time	Rank
Ricardo Senn	Individual road race	4:21:38	44
Ricardo Senn; Gabriel Niell; Federico Cortés; Pedro Simionato	Team time trial	2:24:13.47	12

=== Track ===
Athlete	Event	Round 1	Quarterfinals	Semifinals	Final	Rank
Alberto Trillo; Ernesto Contreras; Héctor Acosta; Juan Brotto	Team Pursuit	4:44.44	4:38.17	Did not advance		5

== Diving ==
Athlete	Event	Preliminary Round		Qualifying Round		Final Round	
Athlete	Event	Points	Rank	Points	Rank	Points	Rank
Cristina Hardekopf	Women's 3 m springboard	41.87	18	did not advance			

== Equestrian ==
Dressage

Athlete	Horse	Event	Qualifying Round			Final Round			Total	
Athlete	Horse	Event	Judge 1	Judge 2	Judge 3	Judge 1	Judge 2	Judge 3	Points	Rank
Jorge Cavoti	Vidriero	Individual	293	247	288	Did not advance			828	15th

Eventing

Athlete	Horse	Event	Dressage		Cross-country		Jumping		Total	
Athlete	Horse	Event	Penalties	Rank	Penalties	Rank	Penalties	Rank	Penalties	Rank
César Madelón	Ceibera	Individual	130.50	36th	174.80	35th	2.00	10th	307.30	29th
Ignacio Verdura	Desidia	Individual	103.50	16th	Did not advance					
Fernando Urdapilleta	Febo II	Individual	116.01	22nd	Did not advance					
Carlos Moratorio	Mesonero	Individual	143.01	55th	Did not advance					
César Madelón; Ignacio Verdura; Fernando Urdapilleta; Carlos Moratorio	as above	Team	350.01	9th	Did not advance					

Jumping

Athlete	Horse	Event	Penalties		Rank
Athlete	Horse	Event	Round 1	Round 2	Rank
Naldo Dasso	Final	Individual	4	24	7th
Carlos D'Elia	Stromboli	Individual	16	20	13th
Ernesto Hartkopf	Baltasar	Individual	19.25	24.25	19th
Naldo Dasso; Jorge Lucardi; Carlos D'Elia	as above	Team	Eliminated		-
Naldo Dasso; Jorge Lucardi; Carlos D'Elia	as above	Team	12	20	-
Naldo Dasso; Jorge Lucardi; Carlos D'Elia	as above	Team	29.5	26	-

== Fencing ==
Six fencers, all men, represented Argentina in 1960.

Individual

Athlete	Event	Round 1			Round 2			Quarterfinals			Semifinals			Finals			Rank
Athlete	Event	Pool	W-L	Rank	Pool	W-L	Rank	Pool	W-L	Rank	Pool	W-L	Rank	Pool	W-L	Rank	Rank
Alberto Balestrini	Men's épée	I	6–0	1st Q	2	1–3	5th	Did not advance									=25th
Raúl Martínez	Men's épée	C	3–3	4th	Did not advance												=37th
Juan Larrea	Men's sabre	E	2–3	4th	Did not advance												=37th
Daniel Sande	Men's sabre	F	3–1	3rd Q	5	1–4	5th	Did not advance									=25th
Gustavo Vassallo	Men's sabre	G	2–3 (1–1)*	4th	Did not advance												=37th

- Note: Gustavo Vassallo was given a chance to advance to the second round in a Fence-Off (barrage) against Aleksandar Vasin from Yugoslavia, and Palle Frey of Denmark, but was eliminated.

Team

Athlete	Event	Elimination Groups		Round Two	Quarterfinal	Semifinal	Final	Rank
Athlete	Event	Opposition Score	Rank	Opposition Score	Opposition Score	Opposition Score	Opposition Score	Rank
Rafael González; Juan Larrea; Daniel Sande; Gustavo Vassallo	Men's team sabre	Soviet Union; L 1–9	2 Q	Germany; L 4–9	Did not advance			=9th

== Football ==
Argentina qualified their men's team to compete in the 1960 Summer Olympics. They were unable to progress through the group stage after beating Tunisia, and Poland, but losing to Denmark. 18-year-old Juan Carlos Oleniak scored the most goals for Argentina with four.

Head coach: Ernesto Duchini

No.	Pos.	Player	Date of birth (age)	Caps	Goals	1960 club
	MF	Alberto Rendo	3 January 1940 (aged 20)	1	0	(Argentine Football Association) Huracán
	MF	Carlos Bilardo	16 March 1939 (aged 21)	2	1	(Argentine Football Association) San Lorenzo de Almagro
	DF	Carlos Gurdiña	29 December 1938 (aged 21)	0	0	(Argentine Football Association) Huracán
	GK	Carlos Saldías	25 February 1939 (aged 21)	0	0	(Argentine Football Association) Sacachispas
	MF	Domingo Lejona	2 February 1938 (aged 22)	0	0	(Argentine Football Association) Gimnasia y Esgrima (La Plata)
	FW	Guillermo Lorenzo	5 January 1939 (aged 21)	0	0	(Argentine Football Association) Boca Juniors
	MF	Hugo Zarich	17 March 1940 (aged 20)	2	0	(Argentine Football Association) River Plate
	DF	José Díaz	20 April 1938 (aged 22)	3	0	(Argentine Football Association) Lanús
	DF	Juan Carlos Stauskas	6 August 1939 (aged 21)	3	0	(Argentine Football Association) River Plate
	FW	Juan Carlos Oleniak	6 March 1942 (aged 18)	3	4	(Argentine Football Association) Racing
	DF	Julio Mattos	30 March 1940 (aged 20)	0	0	(Argentine Football Association) Argentinos Juniors
	FW	Mario Desiderio	1 February 1938 (aged 22)	2	0	(Argentine Football Association) Estudiantes de La Plata
	GK	Marwell Periotti	25 May 1939 (aged 21)	3	0	(Argentine Football Association) San Lorenzo de Almagro
	DF	Pedro de Ciancio	16 February 1938 (aged 22)	3	0	(Argentine Football Association) Racing
	FW	Raúl Adolfo Pérez	11 November 1939 (aged 20)	3	1	(Argentine Football Association) Boca Juniors
	DF	Roberto Blanco	26 November 1938 (aged 21)	3	0	(Argentine Football Association) Racing
	FW	Roberto Bonnano	16 March 1938 (aged 22)	1	0	(Argentine Football Association) Vélez Sárfield
	DF	Salvador Ginel	1 April 1938 (aged 22)	3	0	(Argentine Football Association) Atlético Tucumán

=== Results ===
Group Stage

Argentina failed to reach semi-finals.

Team	Pld	W	D	L	GF	GA	GD	Pts
Denmark	3	3	0	0	8	4	+4	6
Argentina	3	2	0	1	6	4	+2	4
Poland	3	1	0	2	7	5	−2	2
Tunisia	3	0	0	3	3	11	−8	0

26 August 1960
12:00

Denmark	3–2	Argentina
Sørensen 31'; Harald Nielsen 46', 85'	Report	Oleniak 20'; Bilardo 88'

Rome
Referee: Liverani (ITA)

29 August 1960
12:00

Argentina	2–1	Tunisia
Oleniak 15', 82'	Report	Kerrit 25'

Pescara
Referee: Zsolt (HUN)

1 September 1960
12:00

Argentina	2–0	Poland
Oleniak 38'; Pérez 55'	Report

Naples
Attendance: 10,000
Referee: S. Garan (TUR)

== Gymnastics ==
One male gymnast represented Argentina at the 1960 Games. Juan Caviglia competed in the individual all-around event which included the floor, pommel horse, rings, vault, and the parallel bars, horizontal bar. Caviglia's best result came in the floor in which he placed 92nd overall.

Athlete	Event	Qualifying Round		Final Round		Total	
Athlete	Event	Compulsory Points	Optional Points	Compulsory Points	Optional Points	Points	Rank
Juan Caviglia	Men's individual all-around	46.00	48.15	Did not advance		94.15	116th
Juan Caviglia	Men's floor	8.35	9.00	Did not advance		17.35	92nd
Juan Caviglia	Men's pommel horse	7.60	6.90	Did not advance		16.30	114th
Juan Caviglia	Men's rings	7.20	8.20	Did not advance		15.40	119th
Juan Caviglia	Men's vault	7.40	8.90	Did not advance		16.30	117th
Juan Caviglia	Men's parallel bars	7.10	7.00	Did not advance		14.10	122nd
Juan Caviglia	Men's horizontal bar	8.35	8.15	Did not advance		16.50	104th

== Modern pentathlon ==
Three male pentathletes represented Argentina at the 1960 Games, Luis Ribera, Carlos Stricker, and Raúl Bauza competed in both the men's individual, and the men's team events.

Athlete	Horse	Event	Riding			Fencing		Shooting		Swimming			Cross Country			Final	
Athlete	Horse	Event	Time	Points	Rank	Points	Rank	Points	Rank	Time	Points	Rank	Time	Points	Rank	Points	Rank
Luis Ribera	Celollo	Individual	8:09.0	1,153	3rd	770	17th	880	8th	4:09.9	955	15th	15:45.0	865	38th	4,623	13th
Carlos Stricker	Celia	Individual	8:33.0	1,081	15th	724	24th	700	39th	4:05.1	975	7th	16:01.2	817	45th	4,021	36th
Raúl Bauza	Vegliato	Individual	8:15.2	1,135	6th	448	51st	360	56th	4:08.8	970	13th	16:37.0	709	49th	3,888	40th
Luis Ribera; Carlos Stricker; Raúl Bauza	as above	Team	-	3,369	3rd	1,804	10th	1,940	14th	-	2,890	3rd	-	2,391	14th	12,394	10th

== Rowing ==
Argentina had nine male rowers participate in three out of seven rowing events in 1960.

Athlete	Event	Round 1		Round 1 Repechage		Semi-Final		Final	
Athlete	Event	Time	Group Rank	Time	Group Rank	Time	Group Rank	Time	Rank
Pablo Ferrero; Ricardo González	Men's coxless pair	7:17.70	2nd	7:28.84	2nd	7:48.48	6th	Did not advance	
Osvaldo Cavagnaro; Mario Maire; Jorge Somlay	Men's coxed pair	8:02.36	4th	7:59.33	3rd	-		Did not advance	
Juan Huber; Héctor Moni; Angel Pontarolo; Vicente Vansteenkiste	Men's coxless four	6:52.32	5th	6:56.35	4th	-		Did not advance	

== Sailing ==
Athlete	Class	Race I		Race II		Race III		Race IV		Race V		Race VI		Race VII		Final	
Athlete	Class	Points	Rank	Points	Rank	Points	Rank	Points	Rank	Points	Rank	Points	Rank	Points	Rank	Points	Rank
Ricardo Boneo	Finn	323	21st	469	15th	691	9th	1,168	3rd	303	22nd	0	DSQ	0	DNS	2,954	19th
Roberto Mieres; Victor H. Fragola	Star	286	17th	174	22nd	286	17th	154	23rd	370	14th	370	14th	261	18th	1,747	17th
Jorge Salas Chavez; Héctor Calegaris; Jorge del Río Sálas	Dragon	356	15th	1,532	1st	1,231	2nd	833	5th	1,231	2nd	0	DSQ	532	10th	5,715	2nd place, silver medalist(s)
Roberto Sieburger; Carlos Sieburger; Enrique Sieburger, Jr.	5.5 Metre	426	9th	1,079	2nd	602	6th	1,079	2nd	681	5th	426	9th	535	7th	4,402	4th

== Shooting ==
Athlete	Event	Qualifying		Final	
Athlete	Event	Points	Group Rank	Points	Rank
Jorge di Giandoménico	50m rifle three positions	543	19th	1,117	33rd
Jorge di Giandoménico	300m rifle three positions	548	10th	1,088	22nd
Pedro Armella	50m rifle three positions	554	13th	1,106	34th
Pedro Armella	300m rifle three positions	548	10th	1,078	25th
Cirilo Nassiff	50m rifle prone	380	26th	573	40th
Melchor López	50m rifle prone	379	28th	Did not advance	
Oscar Cervo	25m rapid fire pistol	-		567	32nd
Juan Gindre	Trap	-		Did not advance	
Juan Ángel Martini, Sr.	Trap	-		Did not advance	

== Swimming ==
Athlete	Event	Round 1		Semi-Final		Final	
Athlete	Event	Time	Group Rank	Time	Group Rank	Time	Rank
Fernando Fanjul	Men's 200m butterfly	2:25.2	3rd	Did not advance			
Luis Nicolao	Men's 200m butterfly	2:23.9	2nd	2:26.8	7th	Did not advance	
Luis Nicolao	Men's 100m freestyle	1:00.2	6th	Did not advance			
Pedro Diz	Men's 100m backstroke	1:04.7	2nd	1:05.0	6th	Did not advance	

== Water polo ==
=== Group B ===
Team	Pld	W	D	L	GF	GA	GD	Pts
Soviet Union	3	3	0	0	20	10	+10	6
United Team of Germany	3	2	0	1	15	9	+6	4
Argentina	3	0	1	2	7	14	−7	1
Brazil	3	0	1	2	7	16	−9	1

Updated to match(es) played on unknown. Source:

== Wrestling ==
Men's freestyle

Athlete	Event	Elimination Pool						Final round	
Athlete	Event	Round 1 Result	Round 2 Result	Round 3 Result	Round 4 Result	Round 5 Result	Round 6 Result	Final round Result	Rank
Juan Rolón	−73 kg	Sultan Mohammad Dost (AFG); W P	Muhammad Bashir (PAK); L D	Doug Blubaugh (USA); L WO	Did not advance				15
Julio Graffigna	−79 kg	Hasan Güngör (TUR); L F	Fred Thomas (RSA); L P	Did not advance					15

Men's Greco-Roman

Athlete	Event	Elimination Pool						Final round	
Athlete	Event	Round 1 Result	Round 2 Result	Round 3 Result	Round 4 Result	Round 5 Result	Round 6 Result	Final round Result	Rank
Juan Rolón	−73 kg	Franz Berger (AUT); L D	Stevan Horvat (YUG); L F	Did not advance					24
Julio Graffigna	−87 kg	José Panizo (ESP); L F	WD	Did not advance					17
