= Cadar =

Cadar is a Romanian surname. Notable people with the surname include:

- Andrei Cadar (born 1937), Romanian equestrian
- Anton Cadar (1941–1989), Romanian gymnast
