= Gerhard Schulz =

Gerhard Schulz may refer to:

- Gerhard Schulz (equestrian)
- Gerhard Schulz (musician)
