= Highland Wedding =

Highland Wedding (foaled 1957) was a gelding racehorse who won the 1969 Grand National at Aintree by twelve lengths with jockey Eddie Harty. He was bred by John Caldwell in 1957 and sired from Question out of Princess. It was Highland Weddings third attempt in the race and Hartys seventh. His other attempts included in 1967 where he finished eighth, and in 1968 where he placed seventh. He was owned by businessmen American Thomas Hall McKoy and Canadian Charles Burns. He ran his first two Grand Nationals under the Canadian flag and he won under the American flag. He was trained by Toby Balding.
