= Lucio Tasca =

Italian winemaker and equestrian (1940–2022)

- Born: Lucio Mastrogiovanni Tasca d’Almerita; 9 January 1940; Palermo, Italy
- Died: 25 July 2022 (aged 82); Palermo, Italy
- Occupation: Winemaker
- Known for: Tasca d'Almerita

Lucio Tasca d'Almerita (9 January 1940 – 25 July 2022) was an Italian winemaker and equestrian. He was known by many in his native Sicily as "Conte Lucio".

== Early life ==
Tasca was born in Palermo, Sicily into a winemaking family. He attended high school in Lausanne, Switzerland, before attending the University of Palermo, where he graduated in Economics and Commerce.

== Winemaking ==
In 1961, Tasca founded Regaleali, the company that later became Conte Tasca d'Almerita. In 2002, he founded Assovini Sicilia, an association of Sicilian winemakers. He was a founding member of the Istituto Grandi Marchi, and was president of Associazione Grandi Cru d’Italia from 2016 to 2018. He died in Palermo, aged 82.

== Equestrian ==
Tasca competed in the team and individual eventing events at the 1960 Summer Olympics.
