= Cristina Hardekopf =

Argentinian diver

Personal information
- Born: December 9, 1940 (age 84); Buenos Aires, Argentina

Sport
- Sport: Diving

Cristina Hardekopf (born December 9, 1940), also spelled Christina, is a diver who was Argentina's flag bearer at the 1960 Summer Olympics in Rome. She was scheduled to compete in the Women's 3 metre springboard contest, but withdrew due to illness or an injury.

Hardekopf is the daughter of German gymnast Anita Bärwirth, who competed in the 1936 Summer Olympics in Berlin.

== See also ==
- Diving at the 1960 Summer Olympics
- Diving at the 1960 Summer Olympics—Women's 3 metre springboard
- Argentina at the 1960 Summer Olympics
