= Eddie Harty =

Irish equestrian (1937–2026)

Personal information
- Full name: Edward Patrick Harty
- Nationality: Irish
- Born: 10 June 1937 Dublin, Ireland
- Died: 11 February 2026 (aged 88)

Sport
- Sport: Equestrian / National Hunt Racing

Edward Patrick Harty (10 June 1937 – 11 February 2026) was an Irish equestrian and National Hunt jockey. He competed in two events at the 1960 Summer Olympics.

Harty rode for some of the foremost trainers in England and Ireland, but his biggest win came when he was a late replacement for the injured Owen McNally, who had been due to ride Highland Wedding, trained by Toby Balding, in the 1969 Grand National. The pair went into the lead two fences after Becher's Brook on the second circuit, and won by 12 lengths.

Harty died from heart failure on 11 February 2026, at the age of 88.
