= Mitko Milushev =

Bulgarian equestrian

Personal information
- Nationality: Bulgarian
- Born: 8 June 1914; Beraintsi, Bulgaria

Sport
- Sport: Equestrian

Mitko Milushev (Bulgarian: Митко Милушев, born 8 June 1914, date of death unknown) was a Bulgarian equestrian. He competed in two events at the 1960 Summer Olympics.
