= 1969 Grand National =

English steeplechase horse race

- Grand National
- Location: Aintree Racecourse
- Date: 29 March 1969
- Winning horse: Highland Wedding
- Starting price: 100/9
- Jockey: Eddie P. Harty
- Trainer: Toby Balding
- Owner: Thomas H. McCoy Jr. & Charles Burns
- Conditions: Firm

External videos
- The 1969 Grand National in full (BBC)
- Full coverage of the 1969 Grand National (British Pathé)

The 1969 Grand National was the 123rd renewal of the Grand National horse race that took place at Aintree Racecourse near Liverpool, England, on 29 March 1969. Twelve-year-old Highland Wedding, running in his third Grand National, was the winner by 12 lengths. He was ridden by jockey Eddie Harty for trainer Toby Balding. The favourite was Red Alligator who fell at the 19th fence (open ditch).

== Finishing order ==
Position	Name	Jockey	Age	Handicap (st-lb)	SP	Distance
01	Highland Wedding	Eddie Harty	12	10-4	100/9	
02	Steel Bridge	Richard Pitman	11	10-0	50/1	
03	Rondetto	Jeff King	13	10-6	25/1	
04	The Beeches	Bill Rees	9	10-1	100/6	
05	Bassnet	Josh Gifford	10	10-12	100/8	
06	Arcturus	Pat Buckley	8	11-4	100/6	
07	Fort Sun	John Crowley	8	10-4	28/1	
08	Kellsboro' Wood	Andy Turnell	9	10-10	66/1	
09	Furore II	Macer Gifford	8	10-0	20/1	
10	Miss Hunter	Frank Shortt	8	10-0	50/1	
11	The Fossa	Andrew Parker Bowles	12	10-9	33/1	
12	Limeburner	John Buckingham	8	10-0	66/1	
13	Castle Falls	Stan Hayhurst	12	10-0	66/1	
14	Limetra	Paddy Broderick	11	10-9	50/1	Last to finish

== Non-finishers ==
Fence	Name	Jockey	Age	Handicap (st-lb)	Starting price	Fate
03	Tudor Fort	John Haldane	9	10-4	50/1	Fell
04	Fearless Fred	Terry Biddlecombe	7	11-3	15/2	Fell
06	Peccard	George Sloan	8	10-4	50/1	Fell
10	Ballinabointra	Paul Kelleway	10	10-1	100/1	Fell
10	Terossian	Paul Sloan	9	11-3	50/1	Refused
12	Rosinver Bay	Pat Taaffe	9	10-5	50/1	Refused
17	Juan	Mr PJH Willis	13	10-9	100/1	Refused
19	Hove	David Nicholson	8	10-9	100/6	Fell
19	Red Alligator	Brian Fletcher	10	10-13	13/2	Fell
20	Flosuebarb	Joe Guest	9	10-0	100/1	Fell
20	Game Purston	Stan Mellor	11	10-0	33/1	Pulled Up
21	Moidore's Token	Barry Brogan	12	10-9	100/6	Pulled Up
22	Kilburn	Tommy Carberry	11	10-9	22/1	Fell
22	Tam Kiss	Jeremy Hindley	10	10-13	50/1	Brought Down
27	The Inventor	Tim Hyde	8	10-0	33/1	Fell
30	Villay	Derek Scott	11	10-3	100/1	Pulled Up

== Media coverage ==
David Coleman presented Grand National Grandstand: this would be the first National televised in colour. Peter O'Sullevan, Julian Wilson (first National commentary), Michael O'Hehir and Michael Seth-Smith provided the commentary. This would be the final television commentary on the National for both O'Hehir and Seth-Smith; however, both would continue as Grand National commentators for BBC radio until the mid-1980s. O'Hehir wrongly called Highland Wedding a faller at the second Becher's Brook (fence 22) instead of Kilburn, this mistake cruelly cutting short his televised National commentaries.

== Sources ==
- "Past Winners of The Grand National". grand-national.net. Archived from the original on 4 November 2011.
- https://news.google.com/newspapers?id=s2EhAAAAIBAJ&sjid=bIcFAAAAIBAJ&pg=4177%2C5966920
