= Jéhan Le Roy =

French equestrian

Personal information
- Born: 5 November 1923 Dieppe
- Died: 17 August 1992 (aged 68)
Medal record
Equestrian
Representing France
Olympic Games
Bronze medal – third place	1960 Rome	Team eventing
European Championships
Bronze medal – third place	1959 Harewood	Team eventing

Jéhan Le Roy (5 November 1923 – 17 August 1992) was a French equestrian, born in Dieppe. He won a bronze medal in team eventing (also known as horse trials) at the 1960 Summer Olympics in Rome, together with Guy Lefrant and Jack le Goff.
