= Yury Smyslov =

Soviet equestrian

Personal information
- Nationality: Soviet
- Born: 14 April 1920; Yaroslavl, Russia
- Died: 1991 (aged 70–71)

Sport
- Sport: Equestrian

Yury Smyslov (14 April 1920 – 1991) was a Soviet equestrian. He competed in two events at the 1960 Summer Olympics.
