= Anton Cadar =

Romanian gymnast

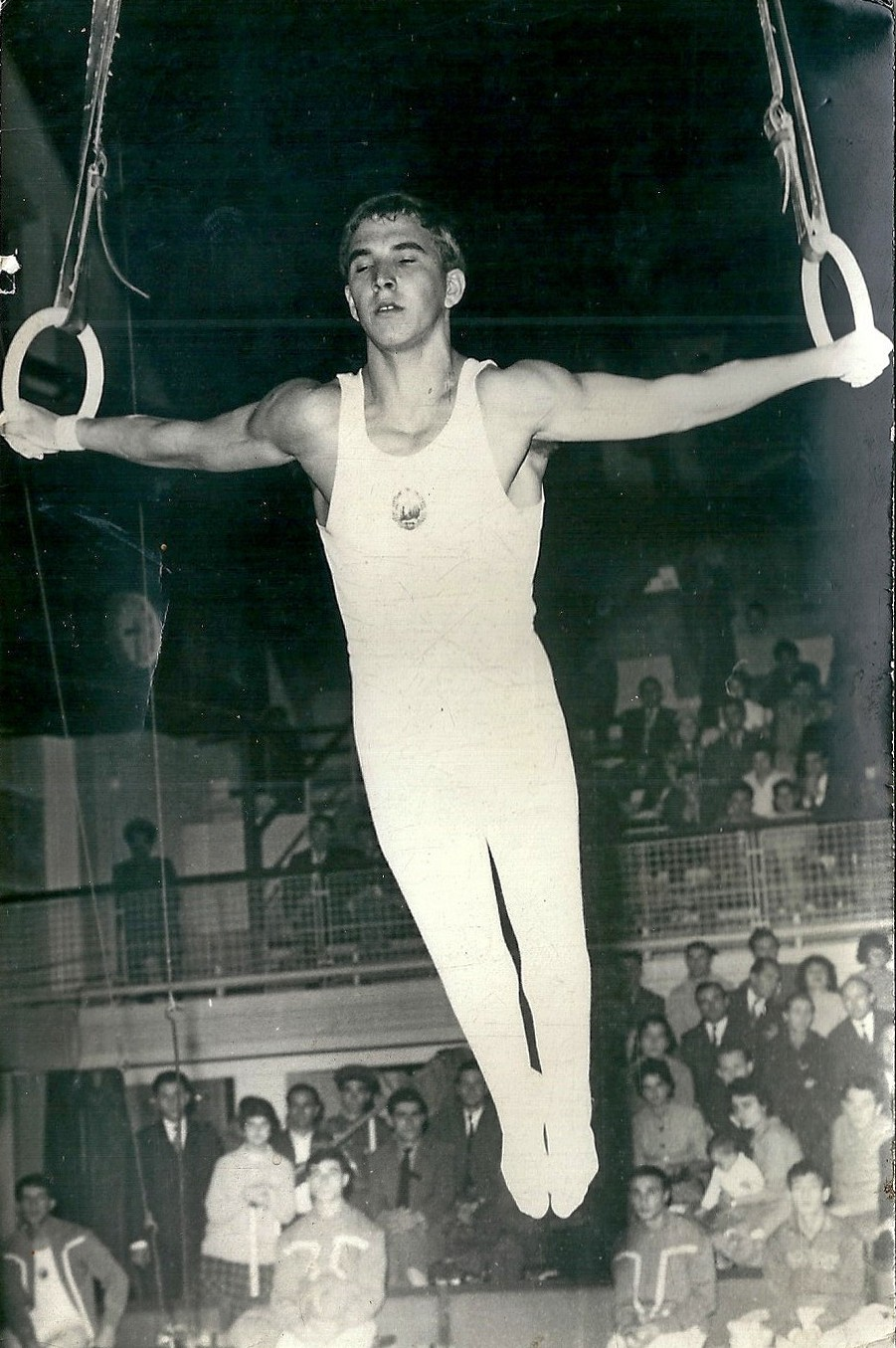

Personal information
- Alternative name: Antal Kádár
- Born: 18 January 1941 Marosvásárhely, Kingdom of Hungary
- Died: 13 August 1989 (aged 48)
- Height: 1.68 m (5 ft 6 in)

Gymnastics career
- Discipline: Men's artistic gymnastics
- Country represented: Romania

Kádár Antal (Anton Cadar) (18 January 1941 – 13 August 1989) was a Romanian gymnast. He competed in eight events at the 1964 Summer Olympics.
