= Giovanni Grignolo =

Italian equestrian (1929–2025)

Personal information
- Nationality: Italian
- Born: 25 February 1929; Rome, Italy
- Died: 6 January 2025 (aged 95)

Sport
- Sport: Equestrian

Giovanni Grignolo (25 February 1929 – 6 January 2025) was an Italian equestrian. He competed in two events at the 1960 Summer Olympics. Grignolo died on 6 January 2025, at the age of 95.
