= Rolf Ruff =

Swiss equestrian (1919–1998)

Personal information
- Nationality: Swiss
- Born: 7 March 1919; Zürich, Switzerland
- Died: 1998 (aged 78–79)

Sport
- Sport: Equestrian

Rolf Ruff (7 March 1919 – 1998) was a Swiss equestrian. He competed in two events at the 1960 Summer Olympics.
