= Sune Lindbäck =

Swedish equestrian

Personal information
- Nationality: Swedish
- Born: 27 December 1915; Kalix, Sweden
- Died: 13 June 1970 (aged 54); Malmö, Sweden

Sport
- Sport: Equestrian

Sune Lindbäck (27 December 1915 – 13 June 1970) was a Swedish equestrian. He competed in two events at the 1960 Summer Olympics.
