= Poul Erik Bæk =

Danish equestrian (1940–2016)

Personal information
- Nationality: Danish
- Born: 11 August 1940; Odsherred, Denmark
- Died: 9 March 2016 (aged 75)

Sport
- Sport: Equestrian

Poul Erik Bæk (11 August 1940 – 9 March 2016) was a Danish equestrian. He competed in two events at the 1960 Summer Olympics.
