= Andrzej Orłoś =

Polish equestrian (1934–2018)

Personal information
- Nationality: Polish
- Born: 16 February 1934 Albigowa, Poland
- Died: 29 April 2018 (aged 84)

Sport
- Sport: Equestrian

Andrzej Orłoś (16 February 1934 – 29 April 2018) was a Polish equestrian. He competed in two events at the 1960 Summer Olympics.
