= José Centenera =

Spanish equestrian (1931–2021)

Personal information
- Nationality: Spanish
- Born: 12 December 1931; Alovera, Spain
- Died: 11 January 2021 (aged 89)

Sport
- Sport: Equestrian

José Centenera (12 December 1931 – 11 January 2021) was a Spanish equestrian. He competed in two events at the 1960 Summer Olympics.
