= Ragnar Gustafsson =

Swedish equestrian

Personal information
- Nationality: Swedish
- Born: 20 July 1930; Stockholm, Sweden
- Died: 24 February 2016 (aged 85)

Sport
- Sport: Equestrian

Ragnar Gustafsson (20 July 1930 – 24 February 2016) was a Swedish equestrian. He competed in two events at the 1960 Summer Olympics.
