= Andrzej Kobyliński =

Polish equestrian

Personal information
- Full name: Andrzej Józef Kobyliński
- Nationality: Polish
- Born: 5 December 1931; Urbanowo, Poland
- Died: 4 April 1990 (aged 58); Bonin, Poland

Andrzej Józef Kobyliński (5 December 1931 – 4 April 1990) was a Polish equestrian. He competed in two events at the 1960 Summer Olympics.
