= Mário Delgado (equestrian) =

Portuguese equestrian

Personal information
- Full name: Mário Avelino Sardoeira Delgado
- Nationality: Portuguese
- Born: 15 October 1924; Amarante, Portugal

Sport
- Sport: Equestrian

Mário Delgado (born 15 October 1924) was a Portuguese equestrian. He competed in two events at the 1960 Summer Olympics.
