= Melchor López =

Argentine sports shooter

Personal information
- Full name: Melchor Jesús del Gran Poder López
- Born: 7 January 1913 Buenos Aires, Argentina

Sport
- Sport: Sports shooting

Melchor López (born 7 January 1913, date of death unknown) is an Argentine former sports shooter. He competed at the 1960 Summer Olympics and the 1964 Summer Olympics.
