= Peter Zobel =

Danish equestrian

Personal information
- Nationality: Danish
- Born: 18 June 1936; Frederiksberg, Denmark
- Died: 3 September 2017 (aged 81)

Sport
- Sport: Equestrian

Peter Zobel (18 June 1936 – 3 September 2017) was a Danish CEO of the insurance company Codan A/S. He was a lawyer, appointed Hofjægermester by the Royal Danish Court and owner of the estate, Bækkeskov in the south of Zealand. He was also an equestrian, and competed in two events at the 1960 Summer Olympics.
