= Marek Roszczynialski =

Polish equestrian

Personal information
- Nationality: Polish
- Born: 5 December 1917; Jabłonowo, Poland
- Died: 12 May 1993 (aged 75); Starogard Gdański, Poland

Sport
- Sport: Equestrian

Marek Roszczynialski (5 December 1917 – 12 May 1993) was a Polish equestrian. He competed in two events at the 1960 Summer Olympics.
