= Grigore Lupancu =

Romanian equestrian

Personal information
- Nationality: Romanian
- Born: 17 April 1936 (age 88); Satu Mare, Romania

Sport
- Sport: Equestrian

Grigore Lupancu (born 17 April 1936) is a Romanian equestrian. He competed in two events at the 1960 Summer Olympics.
