= Jorge Cavoti =

Argentine equestrian

Personal information
- Born: 20 February 1926; Buenos Aires, Argentina
- Died: 17 May 1981 (aged 55)

Sport
- Sport: Equestrian

Jorge Horacio Cavoti (20 February 1926 – 17 May 1981) was an Argentine equestrian. He competed at the 1956 Summer Olympics and the 1960 Summer Olympics.
