= Oscar Recer =

Romanian equestrian

Personal information
- Nationality: Romanian
- Born: 1 January 1934 (age 91); Sibiu, Romania

Sport
- Sport: Equestrian

Oscar Recer (born 1 January 1934) is a Romanian equestrian. He competed in two events at the 1960 Summer Olympics.
