= Jorge Mathias =

Portuguese equestrian

Personal information
- Nationality: Portuguese
- Born: 13 May 1924; Évora, Portugal
- Died: 28 February 1996 (aged 71)

Sport
- Sport: Equestrian

Jorge Mathias (13 May 1924 – 28 February 1996) was a Portuguese equestrian. He competed in two events at the 1960 Summer Olympics.
