= David Lurie (equestrian) =

American equestrian

Personal information
- Born: November 18, 1939 (age 86) St. Louis, Missouri, United States

Sport
- Sport: Equestrian

David Lurie (born November 18, 1939) is an American equestrian. He competed in two events at the 1960 Summer Olympics.
