= Marian Babirecki =

Polish equestrian

Personal information
- Nationality: Polish
- Born: 18 January 1933 Tarnopol, Poland
- Died: 5 June 1980 (aged 47) off Havana, Cuba

Sport
- Sport: Equestrian
Medal record
Equestrian
Representing Poland
European Championships
Gold medal – first place	1965 Moscow	Individual eventing

Marian Babirecki (18 January 1933 – 5 June 1980) was a Polish equestrian. He competed in two events at the 1960 Summer Olympics. He died in a diving accident in 1980.
