= Guy Lefrant =

French equestrian

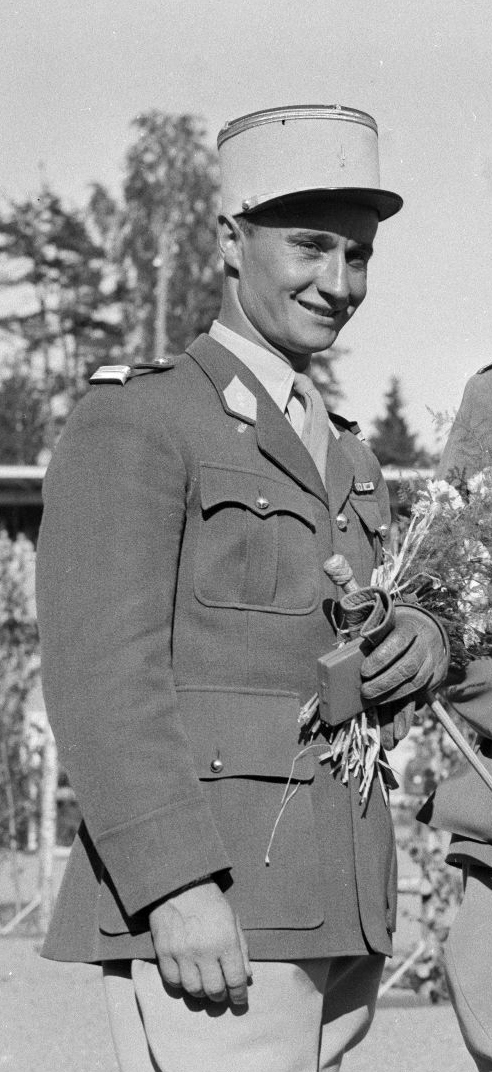
- Guy Lefrant at the 1952 Olympics

Personal information
- Born: 26 February 1923 Muille-Villette, Somme, France
- Died: 31 December 1993 (aged 70) Rueil-Malmaison, Hauts-de-Seine, France
Medal record
Equestrian
Representing France
Olympic Games
Silver medal – second place	1952 Helsinki	Individual eventing
Bronze medal – third place	1960 Rome	Team eventing
Silver medal – second place	1964 Tokyo	Team Jumping
European Championships
Bronze medal – third place	1959 Harewood	Team eventing

Guy Lefrant (1923–1993) was a French equestrian. He won a silver medal in individual eventing at the 1952 Summer Olympics in Helsinki. He won a bronze medal in team eventing at the 1960 Summer Olympics in Rome, together with Jack le Goff and Jéhan Le Roy.
