= František Hrúzik =

Slovak equestrian (1927–2021)

František Hrúzik (Czechoslovakia, 1 May 1927 – 9 August 2021) was a Slovak equestrian who competed in the 1960 Summer Olympics for Czechoslovakia.
