= Vasil Tsolov =

Bulgarian equestrian

Personal information
- Nationality: Bulgarian
- Born: 19 August 1927; Berkovitsa, Bulgaria

Sport
- Sport: Equestrian

Vasil Tsolov (Bulgarian: Васил Цолов, born 19 August 1927) was a Bulgarian equestrian. He competed in two events at the 1960 Summer Olympics.
