= Lodovico Nava =

Italian equestrian

- Lodovico Nava, Italian Equestrian Sports Federation

Personal information
- Nationality: Italian
- Born: 19 April 1929; Modena, Italy
- Died: 5 December 2016 (aged 87); Bologna, Italy

Sport
- Sport: Equestrian

Lodovico Nava (19 April 1929 – 5 December 2016) was an Italian equestrian. He competed in two events at the 1960 Summer Olympics.
