= Arne Preben Jensen =

Danish equestrian

Personal information
- Nationality: Danish
- Born: 23 February 1932 Gentofte, Denmark
- Died: 30 November 1997 (aged 65)

Sport
- Sport: Equestrian

Arne Preben Jensen (23 February 1932 – 30 November 1997) was a Danish equestrian. He competed in two events at the 1960 Summer Olympics.
