= Beraintsi =

Village in Bulgaria

Beraintsi Берайнци
- Village
- Location in Bulgaria
- Coordinates: 42°48′27″N 22°35′36″E
- Country: Bulgaria
- Province (Oblast): Pernik
- Municipality (Obshtina): Tran
- First mentioned: 1447

Area
  - Land: 2,416 km^{2} (933 sq mi)
- Elevation: 733 m (2,405 ft)

Population (2020)
  - Total: 42
- Time zone: UTC+2 (EET)
  - Summer (DST): UTC+3 (EEST)
- Postal Code: 2488
- License plate: PK

Rui mountain

Beraintsi (Bulgarian: Бераинци, pronounced [bɛˈraint͡si]) is a small village in Tran Obshtina, Pernik Oblast. It is located in western Bulgaria, 82 km from the capital city of Sofia, 6 km from the town of Tran and 13 km from the border with Serbia. To the north is the Ruy Mountain, which rises 1,706 m above sea level. The village has a permanent population of 15 people, although during the summer period it increases to as many as 150 people. Beraintsi was first mentioned in 1447 as Braintsi. It stems from a family name itself derived from the personal name Beraya, a vocative form of Beray. The first school in the Znepole (approximately today's Tran municipality) was opened in 1778 by Trichko Gusin and existed for nearly a century.

== Name origin ==
It is assumed that it comes from a personal name or family name - Beraja.

== Geography ==
It is located in western Bulgaria, 82 km from the capital city of Sofia, 6 km from the town of Tran and 13 km from the border with Serbia. To the north is the Ruy Mountain, which rises 1,706 m above sea level. The village has a permanent population of 15 people, although during the summer period it increases to as many as 150 people.

== History ==
According to the legends, the village was located under Rui peak, and then the inhabitants moved to the current place of the village. Many years ago, there was a large stone in the Pobit Kamak area, which was broken at the place where the border with Serbia was supposed to be, but one of the locals managed to move the place of the stone to the village of Strezimirovtsi during the night. The land of today's village has been inhabited since ancient times. There are traces of a prehistoric settlement - in the Zavoy locality, on the right bank of the Erma River, on an area of about 10 decares. Fragments with plastic decoration typical of the Hallstatt era have been found here. Life in antiquity here is attested by the ancient settlement, built on the prehistoric settlement in Zavoy and by the late antique settlement (IV-VI century AD) - in Grebulitsa, about 1 km north of the village. Today's village Beraintsi is an old medieval settlement. It was registered as a timar in the Znepol district under the same name with 10 households and a widow in 1447. Later, in 1606, it was entered as Berainche in the lists of soldiers to the Kazane Iznebul. The village was built on the late antique, associated with metal mining. The first cell school in Znepole was opened in 1778 in the village of Beraintsi by Trichko Gusin. It existed almost until the Liberation, maintained by his successors. This is evidenced by the monument in the remains of it. In the past, the inhabitants of Beraytsi were engaged in bricklaying, tiling and carpentry. The then famous Garvanitsa quarry for trachyte stone was located on the land of the village.

== Religion ==
In the village there are also remains of a late medieval church in the "Church" area at the meal of St. George. It was a small one-nave church, similar to those of the late Middle Ages in the Gornostrum and Znepol lands. The meal itself is formed by two processed stones. The base is rectangular in shape, and in the middle there is an opening into which the second stone enters, which is trapezoidal in shape and a cross is outlined on it. The construction of a new temple in the village is forthcoming.
