= Ottokar Pohlmann =

German equestrian

Personal information
- Nationality: German
- Born: 25 July 1912 Czersk, Poland
- Died: 15 November 1995 (aged 83) Geisenfeld, Germany

Sport
- Sport: Equestrian
Medal record
Equestrian
Representing West Germany
European Championships
Gold medal – first place	1959 Harewood	Team eventing

Ottokar Pohlmann (25 July 1912 – 15 November 1995) was a German equestrian. He competed in two events at the 1960 Summer Olympics.
