= Wilhelm Fleischer =

Romanian equestrian

Personal information
- Nationality: Romanian
- Born: 14 May 1936 (age 88); Sibiu, Romania

Sport
- Sport: Equestrian

Wilhelm Fleischer (born 14 May 1936) is a Romanian equestrian. He competed in two events at the 1960 Summer Olympics.
