= Olle Barkander =

Swedish equestrian

Personal information
- Nationality: Swedish
- Born: 1 April 1918; Delsbo, Sweden
- Died: 9 July 2010 (aged 92); Valbo, Sweden

Sport
- Sport: Equestrian

Olle Barkander (1 April 1918 – 9 July 2010) was a Swedish equestrian. He competed in two events at the 1960 Summer Olympics.
