= Toby Balding =

British racehorse trainer

Gerald Barnard Balding Jr. OBE (23 September 1936 – 25 September 2014), known as Toby Balding, was a British racehorse trainer, one of the few to have won the "big three" British jump races—the Grand National, Cheltenham Gold Cup and Champion Hurdle.

== Biography ==
He was born in the United States where his father, Gerald Barnard Balding, Sr., ran a polo team. The family returned to the UK in 1945 and Toby was educated at Marlborough College. His brother, Ian Balding, also a trainer, trained Mill Reef to win the Epsom Derby. TV presenter Clare Balding is his niece and trainer Andrew Balding his nephew.

He achieved success with both flat and National Hunt horses. He first began training in 1956, aged 19, and his first winners were Bower Chalk at Ascot Racecourse on the flat and The Quiet Man at Wincanton Racecourse over jumps. In 1969, Balding won his first Grand National with Highland Wedding, following up twenty years later with the gelding Little Polveir. That same year he had won the Champion Hurdle with Beech Road, a race he also went on to win in 1991 with Morley Street regarded as the best horse he trained. Cool Ground gave him a Cheltenham Gold Cup victory.

Balding was instrumental in the careers of jockeys Adrian Maguire and Tony McCoy, providing them both with their first jobs in England. He was based at Fyfield near Andover, Hampshire and finally retired on the final day of the 2004 flat season, having trained over 2,000 winners.

On 12 December 2006 he was elected an Honorary Member of the Jockey Club and was for a time a Director of the British Horseracing Authority He was appointed Officer of the Order of the British Empire (OBE) in the 2011 New Year Honours for services to horse racing.

Toby Balding died on 25 September 2014, two days after his 78th birthday.

== Significant wins ==
=== Grand National ===
- Highland Wedding (1969)
- Little Polveir (1989)

=== Cheltenham Gold Cup ===
- Cool Ground (1992)

=== Champion Hurdle ===
- Beech Road (1989)
- Morley Street (1991)

== See also ==
- List of significant families in British horse racing
