= Michael Bullen =

British equestrian (born 1937)

Personal information
- Nationality: British
- Born: 20 May 1937 (age 89) Devon, England

Sport
- Sport: Equestrian
Medal record
Equestrian
Representing Great Britain
European Championships
Bronze medal – third place	1962 Burghley	Team eventing

Michael Bullen (born 20 May 1937) is a British equestrian. He competed at the 1960 Summer Olympics and the 1964 Summer Olympics.
