= Hans Johansson (equestrian) =

Swedish equestrian (1927–2012)

Personal information
- Born: 20 February 1927 Norrköping, Östergötland, Sweden
- Died: 15 April 2012 (aged 85) Kungsängen, Sweden

Sport
- Sport: Equestrian

Hans Johansson (20 February 1927 – 15 April 2012) was a Swedish equestrian. He competed at the 1960 Summer Olympics.
