= Hans Schwarzenbach =

Swiss equestrian

Personal information
- Born: 24 May 1913 Langnau im Emmental, Bern, Switzerland
- Died: 18 September 1993 (aged 80)
Medal record
Equestrian
Representing Switzerland
Olympic Games
Silver medal – second place	1960 Rome	Team eventing
European Championships
Gold medal – first place	1959 Harewood	Individual eventing
Bronze medal – third place	1953 Badminton	Individual eventing

Hans Schwarzenbach (24 May 1913 – 18 September 1993) was a Swiss equestrian. He was born in Langnau im Emmental. He won silver medal in team eventing at the 1960 Summer Olympics in Rome, together with Anton Bühler and Rudolf Günthardt. He also competed at the 1952 Summer Olympics.
