= Saybattal Mursalimov =

Kyrgyzstani equestrian

Personal information
- Nationality: Kyrgyzstani
- Born: 20 November 1930 Frunze, Kirghiz ASSR, Soviet Union
- Died: 20 July 2014 (aged 83)

Sport
- Sport: Equestrian
Medal record
Equestrian
Representing the Soviet Union
European Championships
Gold medal – first place	1962 Burghley	Team eventing
Gold medal – first place	1965 Moscow	Team eventing

Saybattal Mursalimov (20 November 1930 – 20 July 2014) was a Kyrgyzstani equestrian. He competed at the 1960 Summer Olympics and the 1964 Summer Olympics.

Mursalimov was a multi-time USSR champion and later served as coach of the Kyrgyz SSR national team.
