= Rudolf Günthardt =

Swiss equestrian (born 1936)

Personal information
- Born: 15 October 1936 (age 89) Adliswil, Zürich, Switzerland
Medal record
Equestrian
Representing Switzerland
Olympic Games
| Silver medal – second place | 1960 Tokyo | Eventing, Team |

Rudolf Günthardt (born 15 October 1936) is a Swiss equestrian. He was born in Adliswil in the Canton of Zurich. He won a silver medal in team eventing at the 1960 Summer Olympics in Rome, together with Anton Bühler and Hans Schwarzenbach. He placed 20th in individual eventing at the 1960 Olympics.
