= Anton Bühler =

Swiss equestrian (1922–2013)

Personal information
- Born: 15 June 1922 Zürich, Switzerland
- Died: 29 March 2013 (aged 90)
Medal record
Equestrian
Representing Switzerland
Olympic Games
Silver medal – second place	1960 Rome	Team eventing
Bronze medal – third place	1960 Rome	Individual eventing
European Championships
Silver medal – second place	1955 Windsor	Team eventing

Anton Bühler (15 June 1922 – 29 March 2013) was a Swiss equestrian. He was born in Zürich. He won a bronze medal in individual eventing at the 1960 Summer Olympics in Rome, and a silver medal in team eventing, together with Hans Schwarzenbach and Rudolf Günthardt. He also competed at the 1948 and 1972 Summer Olympics.
