= Andrei Cadar =

Romanian equestrian

Personal information
- Nationality: Romanian
- Born: 6 February 1937 (age 88); Târgu Secuiesc, Romania

Sport
- Sport: Equestrian

Andrei Cadar (born 6 February 1937), also known as András Kádár, is a Romanian equestrian. He competed in two events at the 1960 Summer Olympics.
