= Ignacio Verdura =

Argentine equestrian

Personal information
- Born: 22 November 1931; Paraná, Argentina
- Died: 28 January 2018 (aged 86)

Sport
- Sport: Equestrian

Ignacio Verdura (22 November 1931 – 28 January 2018) was an Argentine equestrian. He competed in two events at the 1960 Summer Olympics.
