= Tony Cameron =

Irish equestrian

Personal information
- Nationality: Irish
- Born: 21 March 1941 (age 85)

Sport
- Sport: Equestrian
Medal record
Equestrian
Representing Ireland
European Championships
Silver medal – second place	1962 Burghley	Team eventing
Silver medal – second place	1965 Moscow	Team eventing

Tony Cameron (born 21 March 1941) is an Irish equestrian. He competed at the 1960 Summer Olympics and the 1964 Summer Olympics.
