= Enrique Martínez (equestrian) =

Spanish equestrian (1930–2021)

Personal information
- Nationality: Spanish
- Born: 13 July 1930; Valencia, Spain
- Died: 23 March 2021 (aged 90)

Sport
- Sport: Equestrian

Enrique Martínez (13 July 1930 – 23 March 2021) was a Spanish equestrian. He competed at the 1960 Summer Olympics, the 1964 Summer Olympics and the 1972 Summer Olympics.
