= Fernando Urdapilleta =

Argentine equestrian

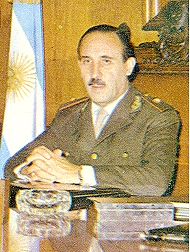
- Fernando Urdapilleta in 1976

Personal information
- Born: 5 August 1924 Buenos Aires, Argentina
- Died: 17 August 2013 (aged 89) Buenos Aires, Argentina

Sport
- Sport: Equestrian
Medal record
Equestrian
Representing Argentina
Pan American Games
Gold medal – first place	1951 Buenos Aires	Team eventing
Silver medal – second place	1951 Buenos Aires	Individual eventing

Fernando Urdapilleta (5 August 1924 – 17 August 2013) was an Argentine equestrian. He competed in two events at the 1960 Summer Olympics.
