= César Madelón =

Argentine equestrian

Personal information
- Born: 23 June 1927; Cafferatta, Argentina
- Died: 11 April 2013 (aged 85)

Sport
- Sport: Equestrian

César Madelón (23 June 1927 – 11 April 2013) was an Argentine equestrian. He competed in two events at the 1960 Summer Olympics.
