= Pierre Durand (equestrian, born 1931) =

French equestrian

Personal information
- Nationality: French
- Born: 15 December 1931 Verdille, France
- Died: 2 October 2016 (aged 84) Vivy, France

Sport
- Sport: Equestrian
Medal record
Equestrian
Representing France
European Championships
Bronze medal – third place	1959 Harewood	Team eventing

Pierre Durand (15 December 1931 – 2 October 2016) was a French equestrian. He competed at the 1960 Summer Olympics and the 1972 Summer Olympics.
