= Norman Elder =

Explorer, author, artist and equestrian

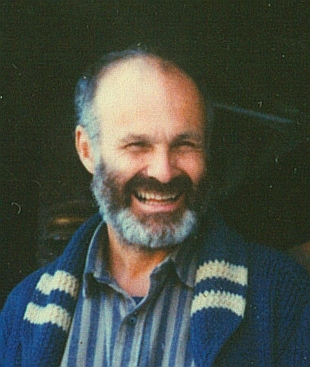
- Photo of Elder, circa 1990
- Born: 17 July 1939; Toronto, Ontario, Canada
- Died: 15 October 2003 (aged 64); Toronto, Ontario, Canada
- Father: Robert G. Elder
- Relatives: Jim Elder (brother)

Norman Sam Elder (July 17, 1939 – October 15, 2003) was a Canadian explorer, exotic animal owner, writer, artist, Olympic equestrian and one of Toronto's eccentrics. He was the owner of the Norman Elder Museum at 140 Bedford Road in the Annex, an affluent neighbourhood in Toronto, Ontario.

== Background ==
Elder when running for Alderman

Norman Elder was a descendant of Robert James Elder, founder of the Elder Carriage Works, a carriage-making business in Toronto. The company provided carriages for the Eaton's chain of department stores.

He grew up on Park Lane Circle in Toronto, where he discovered himself, his love of animals, and his knack for outrageous endeavors.

Elder was lifelong friends with Canadian businessmen Galen Weston and Conrad Black.

He was a graduate of Upper Canada College, the University of Western Ontario and the University of Toronto.

He also ran for Alderman in Toronto, where he had many remarkable television interviews before losing.

In 1998, an Ontario Court sentenced Elder to two years less a day in prison for sexual contact with several young men.

Elder died on October 15, 2003, in Toronto of an apparent suicide by hanging. Along with Robin Hardy and Scott Symons, he was the subject of a chapter in Ian Young's 2013 book Encounters with Authors: Essays on Scott Symons, Robin Hardy, Norman Elder.

== The Norman Elder Museum ==
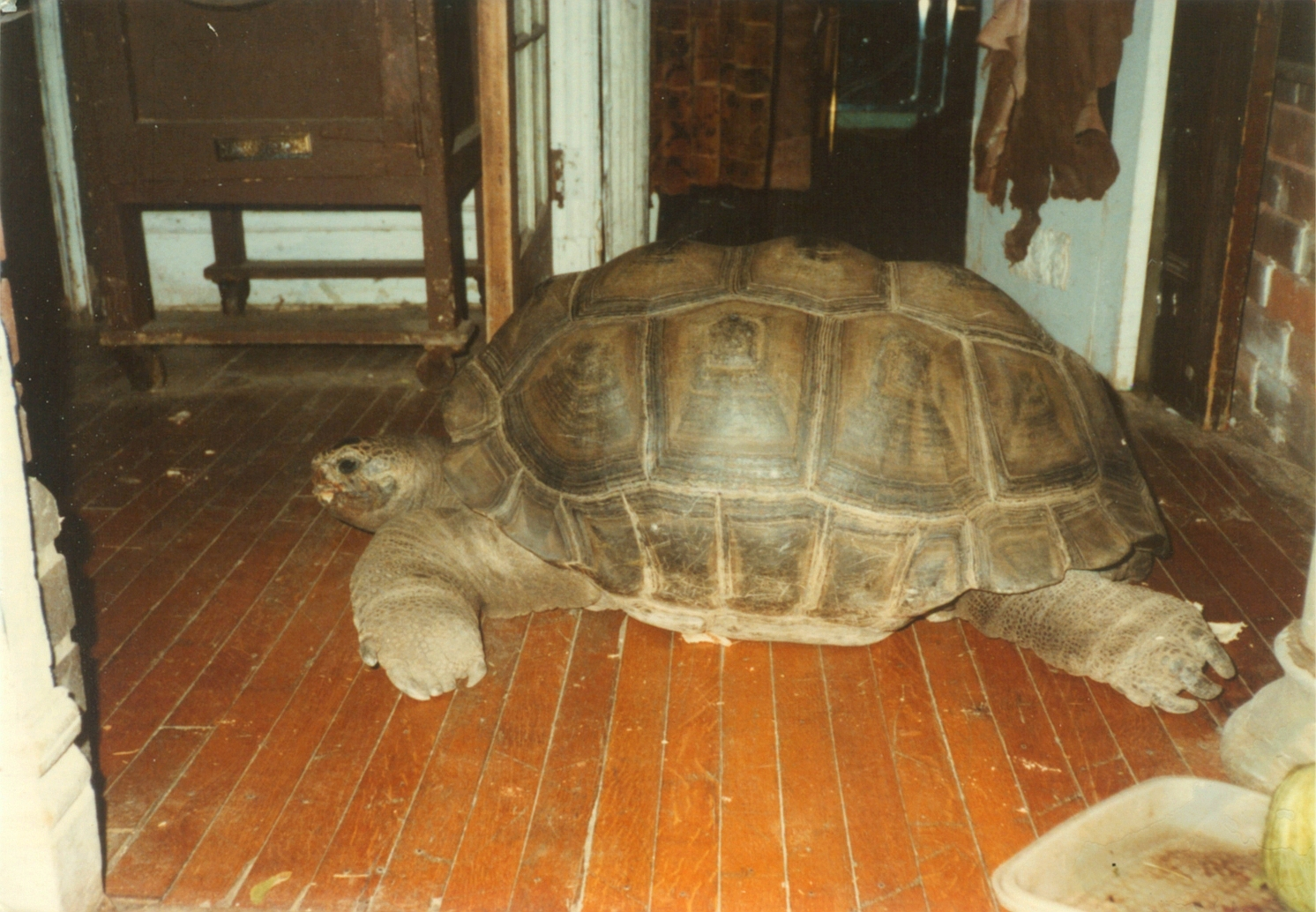
Tony the tortoise, a Galapagos Island tortoise, and long-time house pet

The museum was a private home containing thousands of artifacts collected from his travels. The upper floors of the museum served as a rooming house for up to 10 tenants.

Two of the interior scenes in David Cronenberg's film Naked Lunch were shot in the museum's main living room and library.

The Norman Elder Museum was home to a number of exotic animals. 'Tony', a Galapagos Islands tortoise, lived for many years, roaming the first floor. He ate lettuce and would often walk to those in the room. He enjoyed his neck being scratched, and would extend it during the process. He eventually fell ill and was transported to Guelph University hospital, where he died. There, he was frozen until he could be delivered to a taxidermist. He was eventually returned to the museum stuffed.

Also living in the museum were two very large pythons and a boa constrictor, which lived in the basement and often escaped to other parts of the house. Also residing in the house from time to time were a fruit bat, three lemurs, several chinchillas and numerous ferrets.

Of the myriad artifacts displayed within the museum, the most peculiar were a reconstructed panther skeleton, a collection of grapefruit-sized turquoise malachite eggs, fossilized elephant bird eggs, unexploded military mortar shells, an elephant skull with jaw-bone, dried elephant dung balls, a stuffed dingo, and various human skulls from the Ganges river.

The front garden of the museum was enclosed by an 8 foot high iron polar bear fence purchased from the Riverdale Zoo during renovations.

The back garden held an underground, granite-walled tunnel which led to a room known as the tomb. The entrance to the tunnel was a secret doorway under Elder's bed in the first-floor master bedroom.

140 Bedford Road was gutted and renovated after Elder's death, leaving little trace of the house's former occupant. Norman's beloved dog Charley (who was stuffed and mounted on a movable wheeled platform) was retrieved and is owned by a private collector.

== Explorer ==
As an explorer, Elder embarked on lengthy expeditions to remote areas of Papua New Guinea, Namibia, the Amazon, the Congo, the Arctic, Madagascar, and many other countries. He founded the Canadian Chapter of the Explorers Club in 1979.

He wrote This Thing of Darkness, a book about the Amazon with the foreword written by Prince Philip, Duke of Edinburgh.

== Equestrian ==
Norman Elder
Medal record

Equestrian

Representing Canada

Pan American Games
Gold medal – first place	1959 Chicago	Team eventing
Silver medal – second place	1967 Winnipeg	Individual eventing
Bronze medal – third place	1959 Chicago	Individual eventing

Elder was an accomplished equestrian. He competed as a member of the Canadian Equestrian Team in Three-Day Eventing at the Olympic Games, first in Rome in 1960, and again in Mexico City in 1968.

He also competed in the 1959 Pan-American Games, where in he placed third individually riding Prince Maple, and also won team gold. In 1967 he finished second individually, riding Ranae Doe.

His brother Jim Elder also competed in the Olympics six times in equestrian events, winning one gold medal.

Elder was the author of The Norman Elder Horse Book.

== Conviction for indecent assault ==
In 1998, Elder pleaded guilty to indecently assaulting 10 young men between 1970 and 1980. On March 12, 1998, Judge Faith Finnestad sentenced Elder to two years less a day in jail.

The men were all between the ages of 18 and 20 at the time of the encounters but Canada's laws at the time gave 21 as the age of consent for same-sex contact.

== Books ==
- This Thing of Darkness: Elder's Amazon Notebooks, Published by NC Press, Box 4010, Terminal A, Toronto, Ontario, 1979, ISBN 978-0-89696-086-2
- The Norman Elder Horse Book, Published by NC Press, Box 4010, Terminal A, Toronto, Ontario.
- Noshitaka: when I came to the Machiguengas, self-published, Don Mills, Ontario, 1966
