= Boris Konkov =

Soviet equestrian (born 1937)

Personal information
- Nationality: Soviet
- Born: 15 December 1937 (age 87); Moscow, Russia

Sport
- Sport: Equestrian

Boris Konkov (born 15 December 1937) is a Soviet equestrian. He competed at the 1960 Summer Olympics and the 1964 Summer Olympics.
