= Antonio Queipo =

Spanish equestrian (1931–1979)

Personal information
- Full name: Alfonso Queipo de Llano y Acuña
- Nationality: Spanish
- Born: 11 August 1931; Madrid, Spain
- Died: 12 July 1979 (aged 47); Zaragoza, Spain

Sport
- Sport: Equestrian

Alfonso Queipo de Llano y Acuña (11 August 1931 – 12 July 1979) was a Spanish equestrian. He competed at the 1960 Summer Olympics and the 1964 Summer Olympics. Queipo died in Zaragoza on 12 July 1979, at the age of 47.
