= Neale Lavis =

Australian equestrian (1930–2019)

Personal information
- Full name: Neale John Lavis
- Nationality: Australia
- Discipline: Eventing
- Born: 11 June 1930; Murwillumbah, New South Wales, Australia
- Died: 6 October 2019 (aged 89); Braidwood, New South Wales, Australia
Medal record
Equestrian
Representing Australia
Olympic Games
Gold medal – first place	1960 Rome	Eventing, team
Silver medal – second place	1960 Rome	Eventing, individual

Neale John Lavis OAM (11 June 1930 – 6 October 2019) was an Australian equestrian and Olympic champion. He won a team gold medal in eventing at the 1960 Summer Olympics in Rome, and a silver medal in individual eventing. He also participated at the 1964 Tokyo Olympics, but did not win any medals there. He later became involved with a cattle and racehorse stud in Braidwood, which produced Just A Dash, the winner of the 1981 Melbourne Cup, and Strawberry Road, the 1982/83 Racehorse of the Year. After the Rome Olympics, he married Velma; they had four children.

Lavis was inducted into the Sport Australia Hall of Fame in 1989, received a Medal of the Order of Australia in 1999, and received an Australian Sports Medal in 2000.
