= Gerhard Schulz (equestrian) =

German equestrian

Medal record

Men's Equestrian

Representing Germany

Olympic Games
Bronze medal – third place	1964 Tokyo	Team eventing

Gerhard Schulz (1 June 1931 – 2 October 2008) was a German equestrian who competed in the sport of eventing. He was born in Hartensdorf, Brandenburg. He won the bronze medal at the 1964 Summer Olympics. He competed for the SC Dynamo Hoppegarten / Sportvereinigung (SV) Dynamo.
