= Carlos Moratorio =

Argentine equestrian

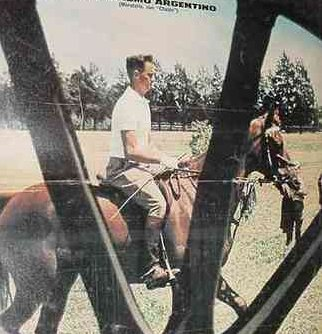
- Moratorio training in 1966

Personal information
- Born: 10 November 1929 La Cruz, Corrientes, Argentina
- Died: 7 March 2010 (aged 80)
Medal record
Equestrian
Representing Argentina
Olympic Games
Silver medal – second place	1964 Tokyo	Individual eventing
World Championships
Gold medal – first place	1966 Burghley	Individual eventing
Silver medal – second place	1966 Burghley	Team eventing
Pan American Games
Bronze medal – third place	1963 São Paulo	Individual eventing

Carlos Alberto Moratorio (10 November 1929 – 7 March 2010) was an Argentine equestrian. He was born in La Cruz, Corrientes. Carlos won a silver medal in individual eventing at the 1964 Summer Olympics in Tokyo. Moratorio also competed at the 1960 Summer Olympics and at the 1968 Summer Olympics. He was a cavalry officer in Argentinian Army.

Carlos was the flag bearer for Argentina at the opening ceremony of the 1968 Summer Olympics in Mexico City, Mexico.
