= Jack Le Goff =

French equestrian

Personal information
- Born: 8 April 1931 Alençon, Orne, France
- Died: 24 July 2009 (aged 78) Saumur, Maine-et-Loire, France
Medal record
Equestrian
Olympic Games
Representing France
Bronze medal – third place	1960 Rome	Eventing, Team

Jack Louis Joseph Marie Le Goff (8 April 1931 in Alençon, Orne, France – 24 July 2009 in Saumur, Maine-et-Loire, France) was a French equestrian, best known as the coach of the American three-day eventing team from 1970 to 1984. He coached the team to multiple international championships, winning 18 international medals, including several in the Olympics. Le Goff is known for having a large impact on the American eventing world, and the era in which he coached has been called the golden era for American equestrianism.

Prior to becoming an American coach, Le Goff served in the French Army and competed in three-day eventing for France. He rode in the 1960 Summer Olympics, winning a team bronze medal, and the 1964 Summer Olympics, where he did not win a medal. He subsequently served as the coach for the French 3-day eventing team, winning multiple regional and international medals. After retiring as the American coach, he acted as a consultant to the United States Equestrian Team (USET) for new rider development, director of the USET Training Center and coached the Canadian national team. He was also an FEI judge, committee member and Olympic appeals judge.

== Personal life and competitive career ==
Born in 1931, Le Goff's father was a French cavalry officer. Jack began riding early, and during his teenage years competed as a steeplechase jockey, as well as showing in dressage, showjumping, and eventing. At the age of seventeen, after the death of his father, Le Goff joined the French military and began riding for Cadre Noir, the national riding academy. After his training, he became a riding master at the school and he remained in this position for a decade. As a French soldier he fought in the Algerian War after his appearance in the 1960 Olympic Games. Le Goff competed in two Olympic Games, in 1960 and 1964. In 1960, at the Roma Games, he finished sixth individually and helped the French team to a bronze medal. At the 1964 Summer Olympics in Tokyo, he finished twenty-third individually, while the French team came in eighth. He was also the French national eventing champion in 1956 and 1964. He is survived by his three children Martine, Dominique and Cyrille with Pauline Kralicek, two children Florence and Corinne with Marie-Madeleine Giraud, five grandchildren and five great-grandchildren along with his long-time companion Susan Smith.

== Coaching career ==
Following his return from Algeria and his competition in the 1964 Olympics, Le Goff became the coach of the French eventing team, remaining as such through the 1968 Summer Olympics. In this position he was the first civilian equestrian coach to take leadership, which had previously been under the control of the Army. During his tenure, French riders took gold medals at the 1968 Summer Olympics and the 1967 and 1968 European Junior Championships.

After the Olympics in Mexico, he was recruited to the United States and became the eventing coach for the United States Equestrian Team. He coached the team through eight international championships, including the 1970 through the 1984 Olympics. His teams earned 18 international medals in all, most notably team gold and individual silver medals in Los Angeles in 1984.

During his time as coach, Le Goff had complete control over the US eventing team including selection, training and pairing of horses and riders. He said that he was able to "identify the Team's event horses, blindfolded, merely by running his hands down their legs." Although this power has since been taken away from the US eventing coach and a more objective selection system put in its place, Le Goff's abilities in this area took the US teams to numerous medals while he was coach. In his position as American coach, USET historian Jennifer Bryant called him "one of the greatest coaches in three-day-eventing history", as he built a multiple-medal-winning team from previously unknown horses and riders.

After retiring as the American coach, he spent five years in Hamilton, Massachusetts as the Director of the United States Equestrian Team (USET) Training Center. He also continued to work part-time in developing new riders for the American team, as well as taking a part-time job coaching the Canadian team for the 1992 Summer Olympics. He also served as a member of the Three-Day Event Committee for the Federation Equestre Internationale (FEI), including serving as a three-day eventing judge with the rank of "O", meaning Official International. He was an eventing judge at the 1994 World Equestrian Games, the 1996 Summer Olympics, and multiple European Championships. At the 2000 Summer Olympics, he served as the chair of the FEI Three-Day Event Committee and as the eventing representative to the Appeal Committee, assisting with supervising equestrian competition at the Games. After his retirement from coaching and judging, he moved between homes in Pennsylvania, Arizona, and France, until he died in France in 2009.

== Legacy ==
In 1983, Le Goff was named Horseman of the Year by the American Horse Shows Association (the predecessor to the United States Equestrian Federation). In 1999, he was inducted into the United States Eventing Association's Hall of Fame, followed by being named as one of the 50 most influential horsemen of the twentieth century by the equine magazine Chronicle of the Horse in 2002. In 2009, after his death, the USET announced the creation of the Jack Le Goff Memorial Fund, to provide travel grants to United States riders competing at the FEI Eventing World Cup Final.

Veteran US Olympic riders such as Michael Page and Mike Huber cite Le Goff as having a large impact on American eventing. Another US Olympic rider, Michael Plumb, says of Le Goff: "He was a disciplinarian, he was very strict, and he coached the team. I think we miss his approach. He could ride any of the horses brought to the Team, whether it was dressage or steeplechase or cross-country." The 1960s, 1970s, and early 1980s are known as the US's "golden age of equestrian sports", with Le Goff being named as a major player in the eventing arena. Denny Emerson, another top US eventing rider, called Le Goff a "tactician, consensus builder, consummate horseman, outrageous flirt, teller of terrible jokes, promoter, master chef, father, fisherman, and probably that most defining persona of all, the quintessential French male bon vivant."
