= Equestrian events at the 1960 Summer Olympics =

Equestrian at the Games of the XVII Olympiad
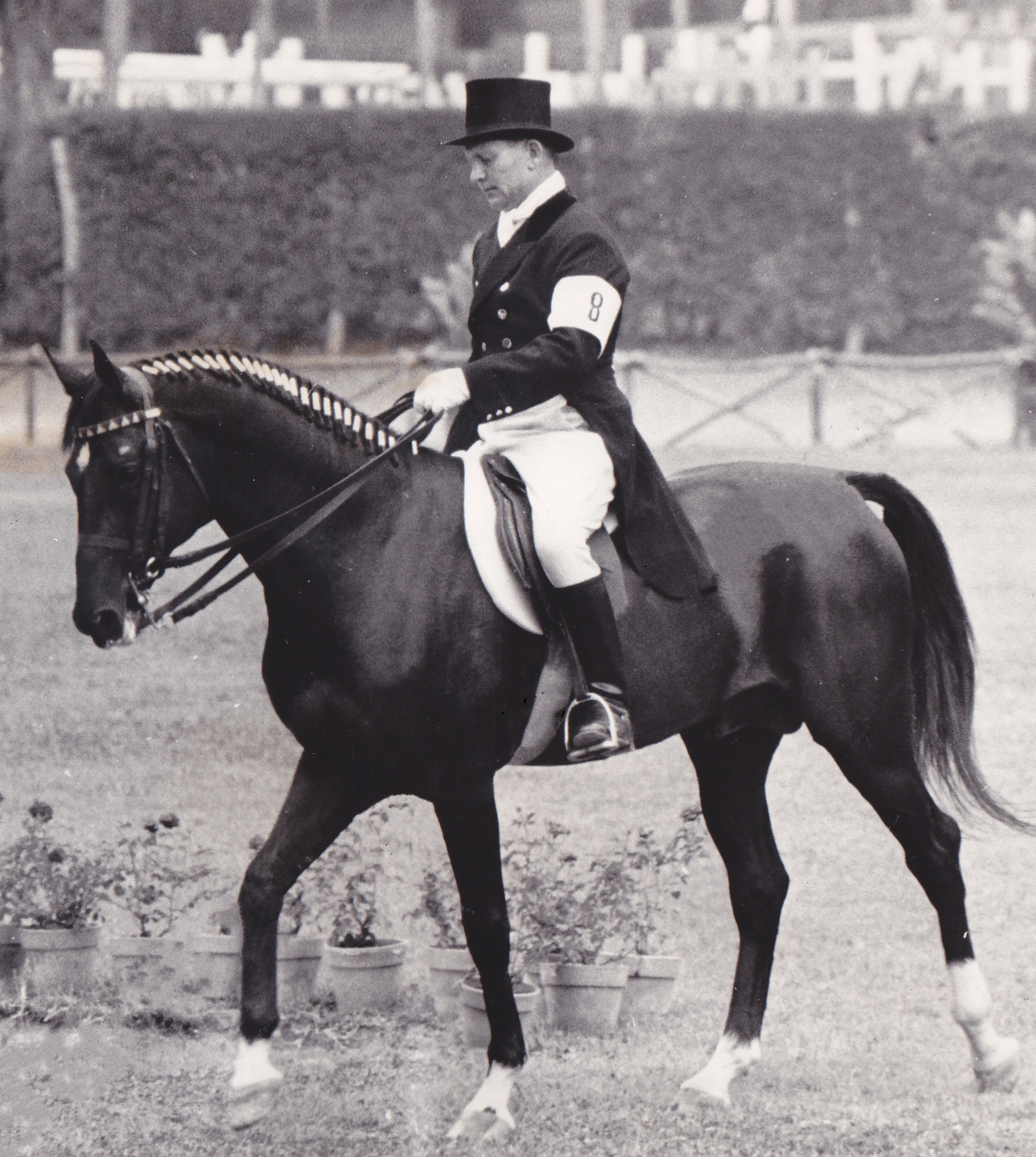
- Sergei Filatov won gold on Absent in the individual dressage
- Venue: Villa Borghese gardens; Rocca di Papa; Stadio Olimpico
- Dates: 5–11 September 1960
- No. of events: 6
- Competitors: 159 from 29 nations

The equestrian events at the 1960 Summer Olympics in Rome included dressage, eventing, and show jumping. Eventing and show jumping presented both individual and team medals, dressage presented only individual medals. The competitions were held from 5 to 11 September 1960. 159 entries, including 8 women, competed from 29 nations: Argentina, Australia, Austria, Belgium, Brazil, Bulgaria, Canada, Czechoslovakia, Denmark, Egypt, France, Germany, Great Britain, Hungary, Ireland, Italy, Japan, Korea, New Zealand, Poland, Portugal, Romania, Soviet Union, Spain, Sweden, Switzerland, Turkey, Uruguay, and the USA. The youngest participant was Min Gwan-Gi from South Korea at 18 years old, while the oldest rider was Lilian Williams from Great Britain at 65 years old.

== Disciplines ==
=== Show jumping ===
There were two separate jumping competitions for individual and team medals, the first time this had occurred since 1920. 69 riders from 23 countries competed, and more than half of the riders had faults at either the 5 meter water jump or the triple combination, which had very odd distances. 9 of the 18 teams did not finish the first round. Although they were considered eliminated under Olympic rules, the Technical Delegate chose to implement a rule allowing eliminated riders to continue with a score that was equal to the worst non-eliminated rider, plus 20 additional penalties. This allowed all 18 teams to jump in the second round.

The individual medals were fought out between the two d’lnzeo brothers, Raimondo and Piero, David Broome, and Argentinean Naldo Dasso. The first round saw Raimondo d’lnzeo and Posillipo with the single clear, followed by Naldo Dasso with 4 penalties, and Piero d’lnzeo and his mount Max Fresson with eight. David Broome (7 penalties) had the best ride of the second round, while Piero d’lnzeo and Hans-Günter Winkler each had 8 faults, and the leader, Raimondo d’lnzeo had 3 rails down for 12 faults. Raimondo d’lnzeo's final score of 12 was still enough to win the gold, followed by his brother Piero and David Broome.

=== Dressage ===
The 1952 Olympics created some serious changes for the dressage competition at the 1960 Games. The previous Games had resulted in a serious judging scandal after the German and Swedish judges favored their own countrymen. These two judges were subsequently suspended by the FEI. Following this controversy, the IOC threatened to remove dressage from the Olympics, but the FEI managed to come to a compromise, removing the team competition from the 1960 Games and only allowing individual competitors (up to 2 per country). Additionally, 3 of the judges had to be from non-participating countries, and ride-offs were filmed and reviewed for a day before the final results were announced publicly.

The other major change was in the scoring scale, which moved from a scale of 0–6 to 0–10.

17 riders competed, from 10 nations. Despite the small number of riders, the competition still took a long time as the judges, conscious of not playing favoritism, conferred for up to 20 minutes following each ride. 5 riders total qualified for the ride-off (2 from the Soviet Union, and 1 each from Switzerland, Germany, and Sweden). The ride-off was filmed and reviewed, the judging panel decided not to change the original placings, and the results were announced to the public 3 days following the ride.

=== Eventing ===
For the first time since 1924, the eventing team consisted of 4 riders rather than 3. Although 19 nations, with a total of 79 riders, competed, the eventing competition at the 1960 Olympics clearly went to the Australians. The team had fantastic performances cross-country, with three of the four riders (Lawrence "Laurie" Morgan, Neale Lavis, and Brian Crago) in the top three spots of the competition following endurance day. Bill Roycroft, the fourth Australian team member, had fallen on cement drain pipes, resulting in a concussion and broken collar bone. Unfortunately, Brian Crago's mount Sabre was rejected at the final horse inspection, removing him from his current silver-medal position. In order to insure his team finished, Roycroft left the hospital to ride in the final phase, posting a clear round and insuring a team gold for his country.

== Medal summary ==
| Games | Gold | Silver | Bronze |
|---|---|---|---|
| Individual dressage | Sergei Filatov and Absent; Soviet Union | Gustav Fischer and Wald; Switzerland | Josef Neckermann and Asbach; United Team of Germany |
| Individual eventing | Lawrence Morgan and Salad Days; Australia | Neale Lavis and Mirrabooka; Australia | Anton Bühler and Gay Spark; Switzerland |
| Team eventing | Australia; Lawrence Morgan and Salad Days; Neale Lavis and Mirrabooka; Bill Roycroft and Our Solo | Switzerland; Anton Bühler and Gay Spark; Hans Schwarzenbach and Burn Trout; Rudolf Günthardt and Atbara | France; Jack Le Goff and Image; Guy Lefrant and Nicias; Jéhan Le Roy and Garden |
| Individual jumping | Raimondo D'Inzeo and Posillipo; Italy | Piero D'Inzeo and The Rock; Italy | David Broome and Sunsalve; Great Britain |
| Team jumping | United Team of Germany; Hans Günter Winkler and Halla; Fritz Thiedemann and Meteor; Alwin Schockemöhle and Ferdl | United States; Frank Chapot and Trail Guide; William Steinkraus and Ksar d'Esprit; George H. Morris and Sinjon | Italy; Raimondo D'Inzeo and Posillipo; Piero D'Inzeo and The Rock; Antonio Oppes and The Scholar |

== Medal table ==
| Rank | Nation | Gold | Silver | Bronze | Total |
|---|---|---|---|---|---|
| 1 | Australia | 2 | 1 | 0 | 3 |
| 2 | Italy | 1 | 1 | 1 | 3 |
| 3 | United Team of Germany | 1 | 0 | 1 | 2 |
| 4 | Soviet Union | 1 | 0 | 0 | 1 |
| 5 | Switzerland | 0 | 2 | 1 | 3 |
| 6 | United States | 0 | 1 | 0 | 1 |
| 7 | France | 0 | 0 | 1 | 1 |
| 7 | Great Britain | 0 | 0 | 1 | 1 |
| Totals (8 entries) | | 5 | 5 | 5 | 15 |

== Participating nations ==
- Argentina (9)
- Australia (4)
- Austria (1)
- Belgium (2)
- Brazil (3)
- Bulgaria (5)
- Canada (4)
- Czechoslovakia (2)
- Denmark (4)
- France (7)
- United Team of Germany (9)
- Great Britain (10)
- Hungary (4)
- Ireland (7)
- Italy (7)
- Japan (3)
- South Korea (2)
- New Zealand (1)
- Poland (4)
- Portugal (9)
- Romania (7)
- Soviet Union (10)
- Spain (8)
- Sweden (10)
- Switzerland (8)
- Turkey (3)
- United Arab Republic (3)
- United States (10)
- Uruguay (3)

== Officials ==
Appointment of officials was as follows:

Dressage

- (Netherlands) Gerard le Heux (Ground Jury President)
- (Chile) Eduardo Yanez (Ground Jury Member)
- (France) Georges Margot (Ground Jury Member)

Jumping

- (Italy) Tommaso Lequio di Assaba (Ground Jury President)
- (Bulgaria) Vladimir Stoytchev (Ground Jury Member)
- (United States) Walter B. Devereux (Ground Jury Member)
- (Italy) Alberto Lombardi (Course Designer)
- (Belgium) Guy du Bois (Technical Delegate)

Eventing

- (West Germany) Edwin Rothkirch (Ground Jury President)
- (Sweden) Gustaf Nyblæus (Ground Jury Member)
- (Poland) Leon Kon (Ground Jury Member)
- (Italy) Ranieri, Count Di Campello (Course Designer)
- (Switzerland) Ernst A. Sarasin (Technical Delegate)
