= Equestrian at the 1936 Summer Olympics – Individual eventing =

Equestrian at the Olympics

Individual eventing at the Games of the XI Olympiad
- Venue: Döberitz; May Field, Berlin; Olympiastadion
- Date: 13–16 August 1936
- Competitors: 50 from 19 nations

Medalists
1st place, gold medalist(s)		Ludwig Stubbendorf	Germany
2nd place, silver medalist(s)		Earl Foster Thomson	United States
3rd place, bronze medalist(s)		Hans Lunding	Denmark

The individual eventing in equestrian at the 1936 Olympic Games in Berlin was held on the May Field (dressage), in Döberitz (cross-country), and at the Olympiastadion (jumping) from 13 to 16 August. Of the 50 horse and rider pairs to begin the competition, only 27 finished. Three horses died during the competition.

The fourth jump was a relatively novel obstacle: a jump over a hurdle into a pond. Of the 46 pairs remaining by that point in the competition, 28 had a fall of the horse or the rider at that obstacle. This included one of the equine fatalities, the American horse Slippery Slim. The International Equestrian Federation subsequently temporarily banned such jumps.

== Competition format ==
The team and individual eventing competitions used the same scores. Eventing consisted of a dressage test, a cross-country test, and a jumping test.

The dressage test was a 12 section test. The maximum time allotted was 13 minutes; points were deducted over that time. The maximum score was 400 points, though the results typically listed the difference between the score and that maximum (that is, a score of 250 would be listed as a "loss of points" of 150).

The 36 km cross-country test had five phases: (1) a 7 km road stretch; (2) a 4 km, 12 obstacle steeplechase; (3) a 15 km road stretch; (4) an 8 km, 35 obstacle cross-country course; and (5) a 2 km road stretch. Points could be lost for refusals or falls at the obstacles in the second a fourth phases, with three refusals at the same obstacle resulting in elimination. Points could also be lost if maximum time limits for each phase were exceeded; however, points could be gained instead if the pair finished the obstacle phases under the allotted time.

The jumping test featured 12 obstacles and had a time limit of 155 seconds. Points were lost for faults (including elimination for the third refusal on the course) and for exceeding the time limit.

== Results ==
=== Standings after dressage ===
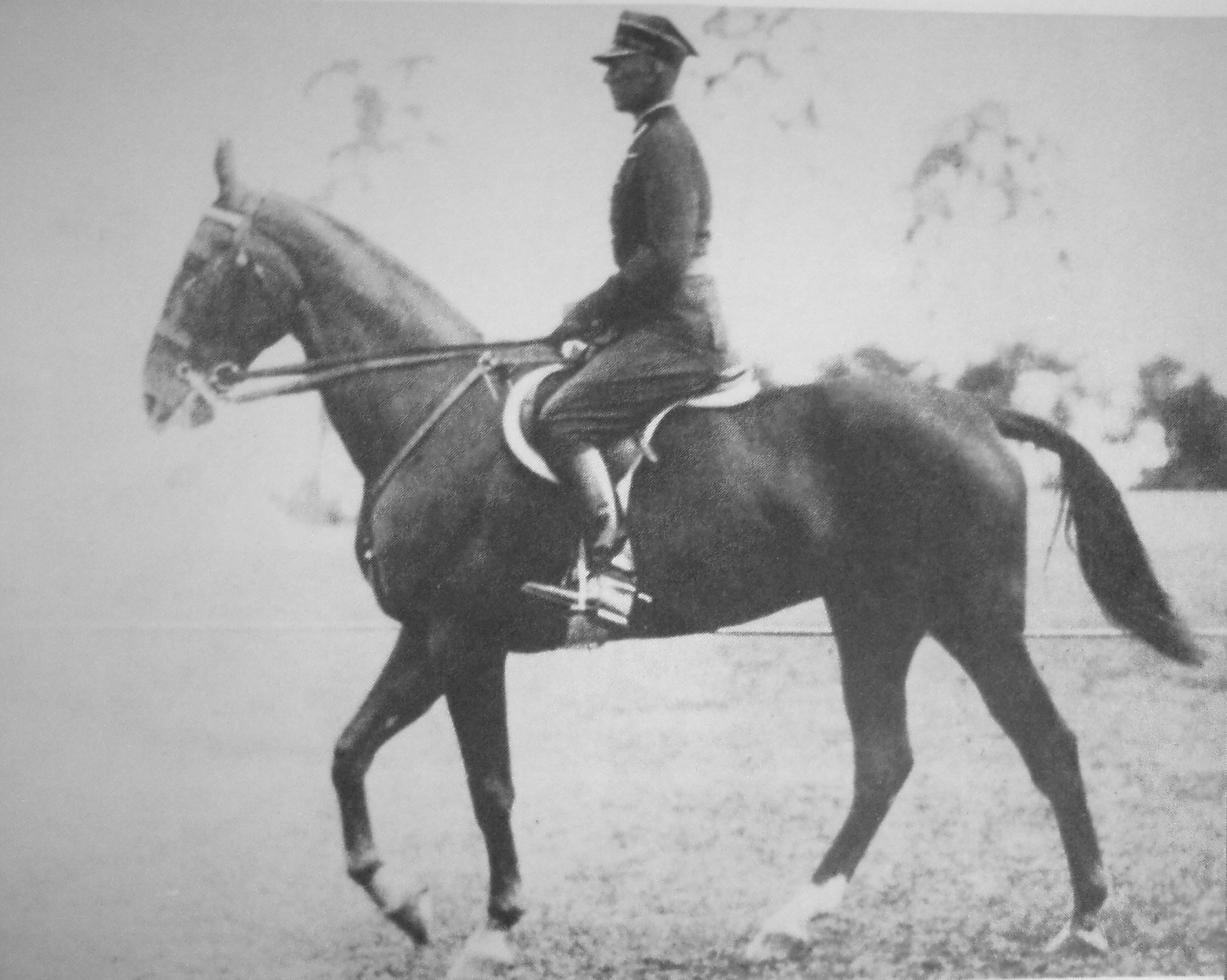
Henryk Leliwa-Roycewicz and Arlekin III during dressage

Rank	Rider	Horse	Nation	Dressage
1	Ludwig Stubbendorf	Nurmi	Germany	-96.70
2	Carl-Adam Stjernswärd	Altgold	Sweden	-102.60
3	Petre Chirculescu	Gasconi	Romania	-104.50
4	Eddy Kahn	Espoir	Netherlands	-109.80
5	Hans Moser	Sergius	Switzerland	-111.50
6	Henri Saint Cyr	Fun	Sweden	-112.70
7	Dino Ferruzzi	Manola	Italy	-113.00
8	Vincens Grandjean	Grey Friar	Denmark	-115.90
9	Charles Pahud de Mortanges	Mädel wie Du	Netherlands	-116.90
10	Rudolf Lippert	Fasan	Germany	-118.60
11	Christiaan Tonnet	Herlekijn	Netherlands	-121.10
12	Mario Mylius	Saphir	Switzerland	-122.00
13	Henryk Leliwa-Roycewicz	Arlekin III	Poland	-123.00
14	John Willems	Slippery Slim	United States	-124.60
15	Zdzisław Kawecki	Bambino	Poland	-127.70
16	Earl Foster Thomson	Jenny Camp	United States	-127.90
17	Giuseppe Chiantia	Dardo	Italy	-131.70
18	Constantin Zahei	5000	Romania	-132.40
19	István Visy	Legény	Hungary	-132.90
20	Niels Erik Leschly	Wartburg	Denmark	-133.10
20	Amaury de la Moussaye	Iroise	France	-133.10
22	Hans Lunding	Jason	Denmark	-134.20
23	Ágoston Endrödy	Pandur	Hungary	-134.70
24	Khristo Malakchiev	Mageremlek	Bulgaria	-136.80
25	Pierre Mange	Pedigree	Switzerland	-137.90
26	Seweryn Kulesza	Tóska	Poland	-138.00
27	Saadettin Erokay	Akin	Turkey	-141.40
28	Todor Semov	Lowak	Bulgaria	-141.60
29	Edward Howard-Vyse	Blue Steel	Great Britain	-142.00
30	Petar Angelov	Liquidator	Bulgaria	-146.60
31	Ranieri, Count Di Campello	Inn	Italy	-149.50
32	Alec Scott	Bob Clive	Great Britain	-152.30
33	Lõrinc Jankovich	Irány	Hungary	-153.30
34	Takeichi Nishi	Ascot	Japan	-155.00
35	Manabu Iwahashi	Galloping Ghost	Japan	-156.80
36	Saim Polatkan	Kismet	Turkey	-157.30
37	Gustaf Nyblaeus	Monaster	Sweden	-157.90
38	Henri Pernot du Breuil	Boreal	France	-159.80
38	Nils Sæbø	Athlet	Norway	-159.80
40	Herbert Ziegler	Manada	Austria	-160.20
41	Carl Raguse	Trailolka	United States	-167.70
41	Josef Dobeš	Leskov	Czechoslovakia	-167.70
43	Otomar Bureš	Mirko	Czechoslovakia	-170.70
44	Werner Walldén	Ennätys	Finland	-171.70
45	Asanosuke Matsui	Shisei	Japan	-175.70
46	Konrad von Wangenheim	Kurfürst	Germany	-176.60
47	Georges Margot	Sayda	France	-177.00
48	Václav Procházka	Harlekýn	Czechoslovakia	-189.30
49	Karl Neumeister	Karolus	Austria	-190.90
50	Richard Fanshawe	Bowie Knife	Great Britain	-222.20

=== Standings after cross-country ===
No pair was over time on Stage A, so no points were lost in that phase.

Rank	Rider	Horse	Nation	Dressage	Cross-country							Total
Rank	Rider	Horse	Nation	Dressage	Stage B Obstacles	Stage B Time	Stage C Time	Stage D Obstacles	Stage D Time	Stage E Time	Total	Total
1	Ludwig Stubbendorf	Nurmi	Germany	-96.70	0	21	0	0	48	0	69	-27.70
2	Earl Foster Thomson	Jenny Camp	United States	-127.90	0	33	0	-40	45	0	38	-89.90
3	Rudolf Lippert	Fasan	Germany	-118.60	0	3	0	0	24	0	27	-91.60
4	Hans Lunding	Jason	Denmark	-134.20	0	18	0	0	24	0	42	-92.20
5	Ágoston Endrödy	Pandur	Hungary	-134.70	0	21	0	0	18	0	39	-95.70
6	Vincens Grandjean	Grey Friar	Denmark	-115.90	0	24	0	-40	27	0	11	-104.90
7	Alec Scott	Bob Clive	Great Britain	-152.30	0	33	0	0	12	0	45	-107.30
8	Mario Mylius	Saphir	Switzerland	-122.00	0	27	0	-60	30	0	-3	-125.00
9	Lõrinc Jankovich	Irány	Hungary	-153.30	0	27	0	-20	12	0	19	-134.30
10	Khristo Malakchiev	Mageremlek	Bulgaria	-136.80	0	12	0	-40	18	0	-10	-146.80
11	Carl-Adam Stjernswärd	Altgold	Sweden	-102.60	0	-40	0	-40	27	0	-53	-155.60
12	Takeichi Nishi	Ascot	Japan	-155.00	0	33	0	-60	15	0	-12	-167.00
13	Eddy Kahn	Espoir	Netherlands	-109.80	0	24	0	-120	18	0	-78	-187.80
14	Henryk Leliwa-Roycewicz	Arlekin III	Poland	-123.00	0	30	0	-80	-60	0	-110	-233.00
15	Karl Neumeister	Karolus	Austria	-190.90	0	0	0	-60	6	0	-54	-244.90
16	Carl Raguse	Trailolka	United States	-167.70	0	24	0	-80	-30	0	-86	-253.70
17	Zdzisław Kawecki	Bambino	Poland	-127.70	0	18	0	-160	9	0	-133	-260.70
18	Petar Angelov	Liquidator	Bulgaria	-146.60	0	9	-15	-40	-70	0	-116	-262.60
19	Edward Howard-Vyse	Blue Steel	Great Britain	-142.00	0	18	0	-140	-50	0	-172	-314.00
20	Václav Procházka	Harlekýn	Czechoslovakia	-189.30	0	15	0	-80	-60	0	-125	-314.30
21	Saadettin Erokay	Akin	Turkey	-141.40	18		0	-300		0	-282	-423.40
22	Todor Semov	Lowak	Bulgaria	-141.60	15		0	-310		0	-295	-436.60
23	Seweryn Kulesza	Tóska	Poland	-138.00	0	30	0	-180	-150	0	-300	-438.00
24	Hans Moser	Sergius	Switzerland	-111.50	0	36	0	-180	-50	-165	-359	-470.50
25	Josef Dobeš	Leskov	Czechoslovakia	-167.70	0	-10	0	-60	-240	0	-310	-477.70
26	Konrad von Wangenheim	Kurfürst	Germany	-176.60	0	36	0	-40	-310	0	-314	-490.60
27	Georges Margot	Sayda	France	-177.00	24		0	-400		0	-376	-553.00
28	Henri Saint Cyr	Fun	Sweden	-112.70	0	27	0	-180	-320	0	-473	-585.70
29	Richard Fanshawe	Bowie Knife	Great Britain	-222.20	-20	18	0	-80	-8520	0	-8502	-8724.20
30	Otomar Bureš	Mirko	Czechoslovakia	-170.70	0	-10	0	-80	-17860	0	-17950	-18120.70
–	Petre Chirculescu	Gasconi	Romania	-104.50	Disqualified (Eliminated, Stage C)							DSQ
–	Dino Ferruzzi	Manola	Italy	-113.00	Disqualified (Withdrew, Stage C)							DSQ
–	Charles Pahud de Mortanges	Mädel wie Du	Netherlands	-116.90	Disqualified (3 refusals, Stage D)							DSQ
–	Christiaan Tonnet	Herlekijn	Netherlands	-121.10	Disqualified (3 refusals, Stage D)							DSQ
–	John Willems	Slippery Slim	United States	-124.60	Disqualified (Horse fatality, Stage D)							DSQ
–	Giuseppe Chiantia	Dardo	Italy	-131.70	Disqualified (3 refusals, Stage D)							DSQ
–	Constantin Zahei	5000	Romania	-132.40	Disqualified (3 refusals, Stage D)							DSQ
–	István Visy	Legény	Hungary	-132.90	Disqualified (Horse fatality, Stage D)							DSQ
–	Niels Erik Leschly	Wartburg	Denmark	-133.10	Disqualified (3 refusals, Stage D)							DSQ
–	Amaury de la Moussaye	Iroise	France	-133.10	Disqualified (3 refusals, Stage D)							DSQ
–	Pierre Mange	Pedigree	Switzerland	-137.90	Disqualified (3 refusals, Stage D)							DSQ
–	Ranieri, Count Di Campello	Inn	Italy	-149.50	Disqualified (Wrong course, Stage D)							DSQ
–	Manabu Iwahashi	Galloping Ghost	Japan	-156.80	Disqualified (3 refusals, Stage D)							DSQ
–	Saim Polatkan	Kismet	Turkey	-157.30	Disqualified (3 refusals, Stage D)							DSQ
–	Gustaf Nyblaeus	Monaster	Sweden	-157.90	Disqualified (Horse fatality, Stage B)							DSQ
–	Henri Pernot du Breuil	Boreal	France	-159.80	Disqualified (Withdrew, Stage D)							DSQ
–	Nils Sæbø	Athlet	Norway	-159.80	Disqualified (3 refusals, Stage D)							DSQ
–	Herbert Ziegler	Manada	Austria	-160.20	Disqualified (Eliminated, Stage C)							DSQ
–	Werner Walldén	Ennätys	Finland	-171.70	Disqualified (3 refusals, Stage D)							DSQ
–	Asanosuke Matsui	Shisei	Japan	-175.70	Disqualified (3 refusals, Stage D)							DSQ

=== Final results after jumping ===
Rank	Rider	Horse	Nation	Dressage	Cross-country	Jumping			Total
Rank	Rider	Horse	Nation	Dressage	Cross-country	Obstacles	Time	Total	Total
1st place, gold medalist(s)	Ludwig Stubbendorf	Nurmi	Germany	-96.70	69	-10	0	-10	-37.70
2nd place, silver medalist(s)	Earl Foster Thomson	Jenny Camp	United States	-127.90	38	-10	0	-10	-99.90
3rd place, bronze medalist(s)	Hans Lunding	Jason	Denmark	-134.20	42	-10	0	-10	-102.20
4	Vincens Grandjean	Grey Friar	Denmark	-115.90	11	0	0	0	-104.90
5	Ágoston Endrödy	Pandur	Hungary	-134.70	39	-10	0	-10	-105.70
6	Rudolf Lippert	Fasan	Germany	-118.60	27	-20	0	-20	-111.60
7	Alec Scott	Bob Clive	Great Britain	-152.30	45	-10	0	-10	-117.30
8	Mario Mylius	Saphir	Switzerland	-122.00	-3	-20	0	-20	-145.00
9	Lõrinc Jankovich	Irány	Hungary	-153.30	19	-20	0	-20	-154.30
10	Khristo Malakchiev	Mageremlek	Bulgaria	-136.80	-10	-10	0	-10	-156.80
11	Carl-Adam Stjernswärd	Altgold	Sweden	-102.60	-53	-20	0	-20	-175.60
12	Takeichi Nishi	Ascot	Japan	-155.00	-12	-10	0	-10	-177.00
13	Eddy Kahn	Espoir	Netherlands	-109.80	-78	-30	0	-30	-217.80
14	Karl Neumeister	Karolus	Austria	-190.90	-54	0	0	0	-244.90
15	Henryk Leliwa-Roycewicz	Arlekin III	Poland	-123.00	-110	-20	0	-20	-253.00
16	Carl Raguse	Trailolka	United States	-167.70	-86	-10	0	-10	-263.70
17	Petar Angelov	Liquidator	Bulgaria	-146.60	-116	-30	0	-30	-292.60
18	Zdzisław Kawecki	Bambino	Poland	-127.70	-133	-40	0	-40	-300.70
19	Edward Howard-Vyse	Blue Steel	Great Britain	-142.00	-172	-10	0	-10	-324.00
20	Václav Procházka	Harlekýn	Czechoslovakia	-189.30	-125	-10	0	-10	-324.30
21	Seweryn Kulesza	Tóska	Poland	-138.00	-300	0	0	0	-438.00
22	Hans Moser	Sergius	Switzerland	-111.50	-359	-20	0	-20	-490.50
23	Josef Dobeš	Leskov	Czechoslovakia	-167.70	-310	-20	0	-20	-497.70
24	Konrad von Wangenheim	Kurfürst	Germany	-176.60	-314	-30	-6.75	-36.75	-527.35
25	Henri Saint Cyr	Fun	Sweden	-112.70	-473	-40	0	-40	-625.70
26	Richard Fanshawe	Bowie Knife	Great Britain	-222.20	-8502	-30	0	-30	-8754.20
27	Otomar Bureš	Mirko	Czechoslovakia	-170.70	-17950	-10	0	-10	-18130.70
–	Saadettin Erokay	Akin	Turkey	-141.40	-282	DQ (Wrong course)			DNF
–	Todor Semov	Lowak	Bulgaria	-141.60	-295	DQ (Wrong course)			DNF
–	Georges Margot	Sayda	France	-177.00	-376	Did not start			DNF
–	Petre Chirculescu	Gasconi	Romania	-104.50	DSQ	N/A			DNF
–	Dino Ferruzzi	Manola	Italy	-113.00	DSQ	N/A			DNF
–	Charles Pahud de Mortanges	Mädel wie Du	Netherlands	-116.90	DSQ	N/A			DNF
–	Christiaan Tonnet	Herlekijn	Netherlands	-121.10	DSQ	N/A			DNF
–	John Willems	Slippery Slim	United States	-124.60	DSQ	N/A			DNF
–	Giuseppe Chiantia	Dardo	Italy	-131.70	DSQ	N/A			DNF
–	Constantin Zahei	5000	Romania	-132.40	DSQ	N/A			DNF
–	István Visy	Legény	Hungary	-132.90	DSQ	N/A			DNF
–	Niels Erik Leschly	Wartburg	Denmark	-133.10	DSQ	N/A			DNF
–	Amaury de la Moussaye	Iroise	France	-133.10	DSQ	N/A			DNF
–	Pierre Mange	Pedigree	Switzerland	-137.90	DSQ	N/A			DNF
–	Ranieri, Count Di Campello	Inn	Italy	-149.50	DSQ	N/A			DNF
–	Manabu Iwahashi	Galloping Ghost	Japan	-156.80	DSQ	N/A			DNF
–	Saim Polatkan	Kismet	Turkey	-157.30	DSQ	N/A			DNF
–	Gustaf Nyblaeus	Monaster	Sweden	-157.90	DSQ	N/A			DNF
–	Henri Pernot du Breuil	Boreal	France	-159.80	DSQ	N/A			DNF
–	Nils Sæbø	Athlet	Norway	-159.80	DSQ	N/A			DNF
–	Herbert Ziegler	Manada	Austria	-160.20	DSQ	N/A			DNF
–	Werner Walldén	Ennätys	Finland	-171.70	DSQ	N/A			DNF
–	Asanosuke Matsui	Shisei	Japan	-175.70	DSQ	N/A			DNF
