= Equestrian at the 1936 Summer Olympics – Team eventing =

Equestrian at the Olympics

Team eventing at the Games of the XI Olympiad
- Venue: Döberitz; May Field, Berlin; Olympiastadion
- Date: 13–16 August 1936
- Competitors: 42 from 14 nations

Medalists
1st place, gold medalist(s)		Ludwig Stubbendorf; Rudolf Lippert; Konrad Freiherr von Wangenheim	Germany
2nd place, silver medalist(s)		Henryk Roycewicz; Zdzisław Kawecki; Seweryn Kulesza	Poland
3rd place, bronze medalist(s)		Alec Scott; Edward Howard-Vyse; Richard Fanshawe	Great Britain

The team eventing in equestrian at the 1936 Olympic Games in Berlin was held on the May Field (for dressage), in Döberitz (for cross-country), and at the Olympiastadion (for jumping) from 13 to 16 August. Scores from individual competitions were used to determine team results. Any nation with three individual horse and rider pairs was entered as a team, with team score being the sum of the three individual scores. All three pairs had to finish the event for the team to receive a place, however; this eliminated 10 out of the 14 teams.

== Competition format ==
The team and individual eventing competitions used the same scores. Eventing consisted of a dressage test, a cross-country test, and a jumping test respectively.

The dressage test was a 12 section test. The maximum time allotted was 13 minutes including deduction points. The maximum score was 400 points, though the results typically listed the difference between the score and that maximum (that is, a score of 250 would be listed as a "loss of points" of 150).

The 36 km cross-country test had five phases: (1) a 7 km road stretch; (2) a 4 km, 12 obstacle steeplechase; (3) a 15 km road stretch; (4) an 8 km, 35 obstacle cross-country course; and (5) a 2 km road stretch. Points could be lost for refusals or falls at the obstacles in the second a fourth phases, with three refusals at the same obstacle resulting in elimination. Points could also be lost if maximum time limits for each phase were exceeded; however, points could be gained instead if the pair finished the obstacle phases under the allotted time.

The jumping test featured 12 obstacles and had a time limit of 155 seconds. Points were lost for faults (including elimination for the third refusal on the course) and for exceeding the time limit.

== Results ==
=== Standings after dressage ===
Rank	Nation	Individual			Team total
Rank	Nation	Rider	Horse	Dressage	Team total
1	Netherlands	Eddy Kahn	Espoir	-109.80	-347.80
1	Netherlands	Charles Pahud de Mortanges	Mädel wie Du	-116.90	-347.80
1	Netherlands	Christiaan Tonnet	Herlekijn	-121.10	-347.80
2	Switzerland	Hans Moser	Sergius	-111.50	-371.40
2	Switzerland	Mario Mylius	Saphir	-122.00	-371.40
2	Switzerland	Pierre Mange	Pedigree	-137.90	-371.40
3	Sweden	Carl-Adam Stjernswärd	Altgold	-102.60	-373.20
3	Sweden	Henri Saint Cyr	Fun	-112.70	-373.20
3	Sweden	Gustaf Nyblaeus	Monaster	-157.90	-373.20
4	Denmark	Vincens Grandjean	Grey Friar	-115.90	-383.20
4	Denmark	Niels Erik Leschly	Wartburg	-133.10	-383.20
4	Denmark	Hans Lunding	Jason	-134.20	-383.20
5	Poland	Henryk Leliwa-Roycewicz	Arlekin III	-123.00	-388.70
5	Poland	Zdzisław Kawecki	Bambino	-127.70	-388.70
5	Poland	Seweryn Kulesza	Tóska	-138.00	-388.70
6	Germany	Ludwig Stubbendorf	Nurmi	-96.70	-391.90
6	Germany	Rudolf Lippert	Fasan	-118.60	-391.90
6	Germany	Konrad von Wangenheim	Kurfürst	-176.60	-391.90
7	Italy	Dino Ferruzzi	Manola	-113.00	-394.20
7	Italy	Giuseppe Chiantia	Dardo	-131.70	-394.20
7	Italy	Ranieri, Count Di Campello	Inn	-149.50	-394.20
8	United States	John Willems	Slippery Slim	-124.60	-420.20
8	United States	Earl Foster Thomson	Jenny Camp	-127.90	-420.20
8	United States	Carl Raguse	Trailolka	-167.70	-420.20
9	Hungary	István Visy	Legény	-132.90	-420.90
9	Hungary	Ágoston Endrödy	Pandur	-134.70	-420.90
9	Hungary	Lõrinc Jankovich	Irány	-153.30	-420.90
10	Bulgaria	Khristo Malakchiev	Mageremlek	-136.80	-425.00
10	Bulgaria	Todor Semov	Lowak	-141.60	-425.00
10	Bulgaria	Petar Angelov	Liquidator	-146.60	-425.00
11	France	Amaury de la Moussaye	Iroise	-133.10	-469.90
11	France	Henri Pernot du Breuil	Boreal	-159.80	-469.90
11	France	Georges Margot	Sayda	-177.00	-469.90
12	Japan	Takeichi Nishi	Ascot	-155.00	-487.50
12	Japan	Manabu Iwahashi	Galloping Ghost	-156.80	-487.50
12	Japan	Asanosuke Matsui	Shisei	-175.70	-487.50
13	Great Britain	Edward Howard-Vyse	Blue Steel	-142.00	-516.50
13	Great Britain	Alec Scott	Bob Clive	-152.30	-516.50
13	Great Britain	Richard Fanshawe	Bowie Knife	-222.20	-516.50
14	Czechoslovakia	Josef Dobeš	Leskov	-167.70	-527.70
14	Czechoslovakia	Otomar Bureš	Mirko	-170.70	-527.70
14	Czechoslovakia	Václav Procházka	Harlekýn	-189.30	-527.70

=== Standings after cross-country ===
Rank	Nation	Individual				Team total
Rank	Nation	Rider	Horse	Dressage	Cross-country	Team total
1	Germany	Ludwig Stubbendorf	Nurmi	-96.70	69	-609.90
1	Germany	Rudolf Lippert	Fasan	-118.60	27	-609.90
1	Germany	Konrad von Wangenheim	Kurfürst	-176.60	-314	-609.90
2	Bulgaria	Khristo Malakchiev	Mageremlek	-136.80	-10	-846.00
2	Bulgaria	Petar Angelov	Liquidator	-146.60	-116	-846.00
2	Bulgaria	Todor Semov	Lowak	-141.60	-295	-846.00
3	Poland	Henryk Leliwa-Roycewicz	Arlekin III	-123.00	-110	-931.70
3	Poland	Zdzisław Kawecki	Bambino	-127.70	-133	-931.70
3	Poland	Seweryn Kulesza	Tóska	-138.00	-300	-931.70
4	Great Britain	Alec Scott	Bob Clive	-152.30	45	-9145.50
4	Great Britain	Edward Howard-Vyse	Blue Steel	-142.00	-172	-9145.50
4	Great Britain	Richard Fanshawe	Bowie Knife	-222.20	-8502	-9145.50
5	Czechoslovakia	Václav Procházka	Harlekýn	-189.30	-125	-18912.70
5	Czechoslovakia	Josef Dobeš	Leskov	-167.70	-310	-18912.70
5	Czechoslovakia	Otomar Bureš	Mirko	-170.70	-17950	-18912.70
–	Netherlands	Eddy Kahn	Espoir	-109.80	-78	DQ
–	Netherlands	Charles Pahud de Mortanges	Mädel wie Du	-116.90	DQ	DQ
–	Netherlands	Christiaan Tonnet	Herlekijn	-121.10	DQ	DQ
–	Switzerland	Mario Mylius	Saphir	-122.00	-3	DQ
–	Switzerland	Hans Moser	Sergius	-111.50	-359	DQ
–	Switzerland	Pierre Mange	Pedigree	-137.90	DQ	DQ
–	Sweden	Carl-Adam Stjernswärd	Altgold	-102.60	-53	DQ
–	Sweden	Henri Saint Cyr	Fun	-112.70	-473	DQ
–	Sweden	Gustaf Nyblaeus	Monaster	-157.90	DQ	DQ
–	Denmark	Hans Lunding	Jason	-134.20	42	DQ
–	Denmark	Vincens Grandjean	Grey Friar	-115.90	11	DQ
–	Denmark	Niels Erik Leschly	Wartburg	-133.10	DQ	DQ
–	Italy	Dino Ferruzzi	Manola	-113.00	DQ	DQ
–	Italy	Giuseppe Chiantia	Dardo	-131.70	DQ	DQ
–	Italy	Ranieri, Count Di Campello	Inn	-149.50	DQ	DQ
–	United States	Earl Foster Thomson	Jenny Camp	-127.90	38	DQ
–	United States	Carl Raguse	Trailolka	-167.70	-86	DQ
–	United States	John Willems	Slippery Slim	-124.60	DQ	DQ
–	Hungary	Ágoston Endrödy	Pandur	-134.70	39	DQ
–	Hungary	Lõrinc Jankovich	Irány	-153.30	19	DQ
–	Hungary	István Visy	Legény	-132.90	DQ	DQ
–	France	Georges Margot	Sayda	-177.00	-376	DQ
–	France	Amaury de la Moussaye	Iroise	-133.10	DQ	DQ
–	France	Henri Pernot du Breuil	Boreal	-159.80	DQ	DQ
–	Japan	Takeichi Nishi	Ascot	-155.00	-12	DQ
–	Japan	Manabu Iwahashi	Galloping Ghost	-156.80	DQ	DQ
–	Japan	Asanosuke Matsui	Shisei	-175.70	DQ	DQ

=== Final results after jumping ===
Rank	Nation	Individual						Team total
Rank	Nation	Rider	Horse	Dressage	Cross-country	Jumping	Total	Team total
1st place, gold medalist(s)	Germany	Ludwig Stubbendorf	Nurmi	-96.70	69	-10	-37.70	-676.65
1st place, gold medalist(s)	Germany	Rudolf Lippert	Fasan	-118.60	27	-20	-111.60	-676.65
1st place, gold medalist(s)	Germany	Konrad von Wangenheim	Kurfürst	-176.60	-314	-36.75	-527.35	-676.65
2nd place, silver medalist(s)	Poland	Henryk Leliwa-Roycewicz	Arlekin III	-123.00	-110	-20	-253.00	-991.70
2nd place, silver medalist(s)	Poland	Zdzisław Kawecki	Bambino	-127.70	-133	-40	-300.70	-991.70
2nd place, silver medalist(s)	Poland	Seweryn Kulesza	Tóska	-138.00	-300	0	-438.00	-991.70
3rd place, bronze medalist(s)	Great Britain	Alec Scott	Bob Clive	-152.30	45	-10	-117.30	-9195.50
3rd place, bronze medalist(s)	Great Britain	Edward Howard-Vyse	Blue Steel	-142.00	-172	-10	-324.00	-9195.50
3rd place, bronze medalist(s)	Great Britain	Richard Fanshawe	Bowie Knife	-222.20	-8502	-30	-8754.20	-9195.50
4	Czechoslovakia	Václav Procházka	Harlekýn	-189.30	-125	-10	-324.30	-18952.70
4	Czechoslovakia	Josef Dobeš	Leskov	-167.70	-310	-20	-497.70	-18952.70
4	Czechoslovakia	Otomar Bureš	Mirko	-170.70	-17950	-10	-18130.70	-18952.70
–	Bulgaria	Khristo Malakchiev	Mageremlek	-136.80	-10	-10	-156.80	DQ
–	Bulgaria	Petar Angelov	Liquidator	-146.60	-116	-30	-292.60	DQ
–	Bulgaria	Todor Semov	Lowak	-141.60	-295	DQ	DNF	DQ
–	Netherlands	Eddy Kahn	Espoir	-109.80	-78	-30	-217.80	DQ
–	Netherlands	Charles Pahud de Mortanges	Mädel wie Du	-116.90	DQ	–	DNF	DQ
–	Netherlands	Christiaan Tonnet	Herlekijn	-121.10	DQ	–	DNF	DQ
–	Switzerland	Mario Mylius	Saphir	-122.00	-3	-20	-145.00	DQ
–	Switzerland	Hans Moser	Sergius	-111.50	-359	-20	-490.50	DQ
–	Switzerland	Pierre Mange	Pedigree	-137.90	DQ	–	DNF	DQ
–	Sweden	Carl-Adam Stjernswärd	Altgold	-102.60	-53	-20	-175.60	DQ
–	Sweden	Henri Saint Cyr	Fun	-112.70	-473	-40	-625.70	DQ
–	Sweden	Gustaf Nyblaeus	Monaster	-157.90	DQ	–	DNF	DQ
–	Denmark	Hans Lunding	Jason	-134.20	42	-10	-102.20	DQ
–	Denmark	Vincens Grandjean	Grey Friar	-115.90	11	0	-104.90	DQ
–	Denmark	Niels Erik Leschly	Wartburg	-133.10	DQ	–	DNF	DQ
–	Italy	Dino Ferruzzi	Manola	-113.00	DQ	–	DNF	DQ
–	Italy	Giuseppe Chiantia	Dardo	-131.70	DQ	–	DNF	DQ
–	Italy	Ranieri, Count Di Campello	Inn	-149.50	DQ	–	DNF	DQ
–	United States	Earl Foster Thomson	Jenny Camp	-127.90	38	-10	-99.90	DQ
–	United States	Carl Raguse	Trailolka	-167.70	-86	-10	-263.70	DQ
–	United States	John Willems	Slippery Slim	-124.60	DQ	–	DNF	DQ
–	Hungary	Ágoston Endrödy	Pandur	-134.70	39	-10	-105.70	DQ
–	Hungary	Lõrinc Jankovich	Irány	-153.30	19	-20	-154.30	DQ
–	Hungary	István Visy	Legény	-132.90	DQ	–	DNF	DQ
–	France	Georges Margot	Sayda	-177.00	-376	DNS	DNF	DQ
–	France	Amaury de la Moussaye	Iroise	-133.10	DQ	–	DNF	DQ
–	France	Henri Pernot du Breuil	Boreal	-159.80	DQ	–	DNF	DQ
–	Japan	Takeichi Nishi	Ascot	-155.00	-12	-10	-177.00	DQ
–	Japan	Manabu Iwahashi	Galloping Ghost	-156.80	DQ	–	DNF	DQ
–	Japan	Asanosuke Matsui	Shisei	-175.70	DQ	–	DNF	DQ
