= Jankovich =

Jankovich is a surname. It can be a modified form of the South Slavic surnames Janković or Jankovič.

Notable people with the surname include:

- Béla Jankovich (1865–1939), Hungarian politician
- István Jankovich (1889–1974), Hungarian athlete of Slovak ethnicity
- Keever Jankovich (1928–1979), American football player
- Lőrinc Jankovich, Hungarian equestrian
- Mark Jankovich, South African entrepreneur
- Richard Jankovich, American entrepreneur, Musician
- Sam Jankovich (1934–2019), American football player
- Tim Jankovich (born 1959), American basketball player
