= Jankovic =

Jankovic may refer to:

- Janković, South Slavic surname
- Jankovič, West and South Slavic surname
