= Alan Fowler =

Alan Fowler is the name of:

- Alan Fowler (footballer) (1911–1944), English footballer
- Alan Fowler (physicist) (1928–2024), American scientist
