= Petar Angelov =

Petar Angelov may refer to:

- Petar Angelov (equestrian) (1897–?), Bulgarian Olympic equestrian
- Petar Angelov (military officer) (1878–1926), Bulgarian military officer and revolutionary
- Petar Angelov (alpine skier) (born 1943), Bulgarian alpine skier
- Petar Ivanov Angelov (born 1932), Bulgarian alpine skier
- Petar Angelov (handballer) (born 1977), Macedonian handball player
