= Jakovich =

Jakovich or Yakovich is a surname. Notable people with the surname include:

- Allen Jakovich (born 1968), Australian rules footballer
- Glen Jakovich (born 1973), Australian rules footballer, brother of Allen
- Yuri Yakovich (born 1962), Russian chess grandmaster

== See also ==
- Jankovich (surname)
