= Vennerslund =

Manor house in southeastern Denmark

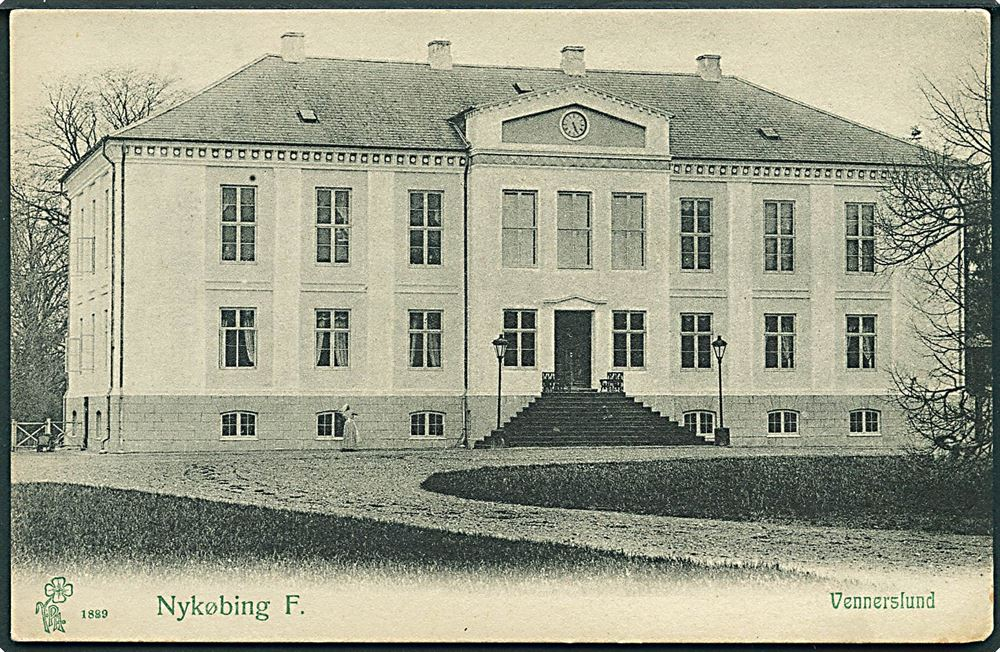
- The main building seen on an old postcard.
- Interactive map of the Vennerslund area

General information
- Architectural style: Late Neoclassical
- Location: Falster, Denmark
- Coordinates: 54°51′22″N 11°48′6″E
- Completed: 1845 (new main building); 177s (old main building)
- Client: Hans Tersling

Design and construction
- Architect: Otto Michael Glahn (new main building)

Vennerslund is a manor house located 11 km northwest of Nykøbing on the island of Falster in southeastern Denmark. The estate has belonged to the Grandjean family since 1809. The new and old main buildings were both listed on the Danish registry of protected buildings and places by the Danish Heritage Agency on 13 April 1950. The estate has a total area of 1010 hectares and borders Guldborgsund in the west.

== History ==
=== Stafager ===
Vennerslund was originally called Stadager and took its name after the village it was situated in. The first known owner was Folmer Folmersen who owned it in 1351. The estate was later owned by the Lunge family and from the middle of the 15th century by the Venstermand family. Lave Venstermand became the last member of the family to own the estate. In 1576 he ceded it to king Frederick II in exchange for Pederstrup on Lolland. Frederick II renamed the estate Sophieholm after his wife sin Sophie of Mecklenburg but its old name was reintroduced in 1583.

=== 1765–1809:Vennerslund and Kirstineberg ===
Christian VII sold the royal holdings on Falster in auction 1766 to make payments on the Danish sovereign debt. The land was divided into eight parcels, each of which forming the basis of a new manor house with associated tenant farms. Parcel number seven was acquired by Hans Tersling and Peder Thestrup who constructed a house on the land and named the estate Vennerslund ("Friends' Grove"). A second manor house was built on the land in 1773 after the tenant farmers had complained about the long distances they had to cover to work in the fields. The new manor house was given the name Kirstineberg ("Kirstine's Hill") after Tersling's wife Kirstine. Tersling died in 1785 and his widow Kirstine Tersling became the sole owner of Vennerslund and Kirstineberg four years later. When she then married Jakob Edvard Colbjørnsen, it was decided in a prenuptial that Vennerslund was to be passed on to her son from her first marriage, Jørgen Tersling, while Kirstineberg would be passed on to the Colbjørnsen family.

=== 1809–present: The Grandjean family ===
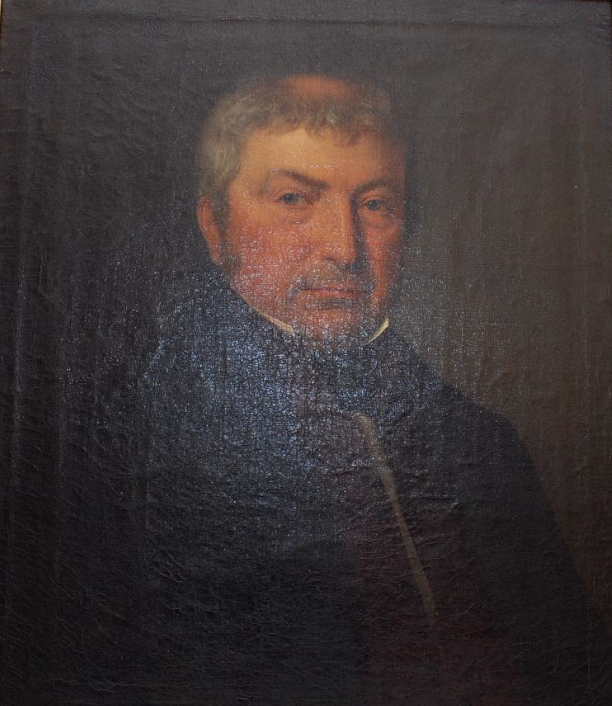
Carl Vincens Grandjean

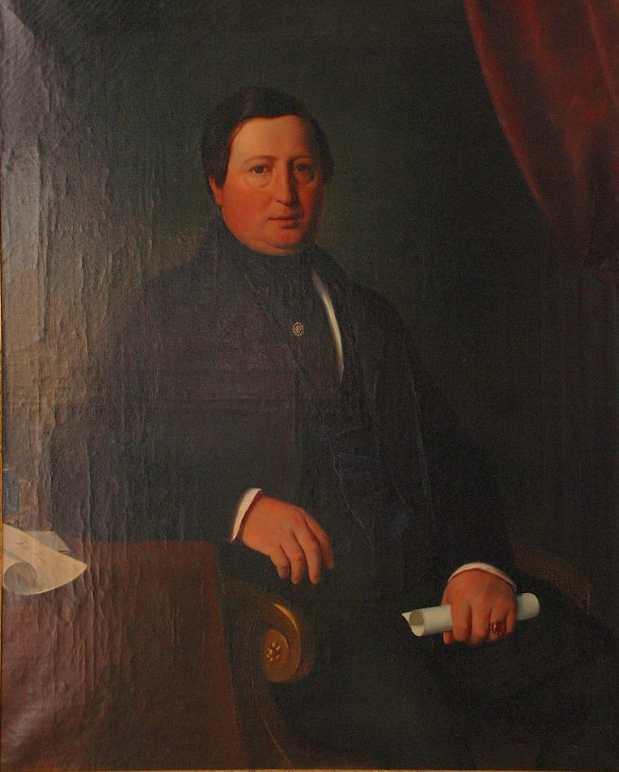
Ludvig Grandjean

In 1809, Tersling sold Vennerslund for 30000 rigsdaler to Carl Vincens Grandjean. Grandjean established Det Grandjean'ske Legathus in the parish prior to his death in 1844. He had no children and Vennerslund was therefore passed on to his nephew Ludvig Grandjean. Ludvig Grandjean founded the stamhus Vennerslund in accordance with his uncle's will from 1840 with the result that it could no longer be sold, pledged or divided between heirs. It was the last wtamhus established in Denmark. In 1845, he also constructed a new, two-storey main building with the assistance of the master carpenter Otto Michael Glahn.

On Ludvig Grrandjean' death in 1861. Vannerslund was passed on to his son Johan Carl Wilhelm Grandjean. He was in turn succeeded by his own son, Johan Ludvig Grandjean, who held the estate until 1926.

The so-called lensafløsningslov of 1919 introduced such a hard taxation of len and stamhuse that it meant a de facto dissolution of them. In 1930, it was therefore ceded to his son Vincens Grandjean as his personal property.

Vincens Grandjean married on 14 March 1937 Nina Agnete Elsa Charlotta Tuxen, a daughter of the painter Laurits Tuxen. Their daughter and only child Susanne Ingeborg Grandjean married on 12 September 1963 to Jens Knud Bille, Count Brockenhuus-Schack, owner of nearby Barritskov. Her father ceded Vennerslund to her in conjunction with the wedding. In 1978, Baritskov was sold to Mogens Harttung. In 2001, Vennerslund was ceded to her son Kim Vincens Bille Brockenhuus-Schack.

== Architecture ==
The current main building is from 1845 and was built by the architect Otto Michael Glahn in the Late Empire style for Ludvig Grandjean. It is a rectangular, two-storey brick building with white finishing and a median risalit tipped by a triangular pediment on both sides. A horizontal band is located between the first and second floor and a frieze with masks and stucco rosettes runs below the roof. A cast iron staircase leads up to the main entrance. The interior of the building is decorated in the Late Neoclassical style. The main building was subject to a major renovation in 1942.

The main building fronts a large courtyard to the east. The courtyard is surrounded by farm buildings on the other sides. The garden is located to the south and west of the main building. The farm buildings are generally older than the main building and have timber framing.

A number of other buildings are located to the north and west of the complex. The old, half-timbered main building from the 1770s is located just south of the new main building.

== Today ==
Vennerslyst is currently owned by Kim Vincens Bille Brockenhuus-Schack. He is the seventh generation of the Grandjean family on the estate.

The estate has a total area of 1,010 ha (2,500 acres) of which 70 ha (170 acres) are farmland and 340 ha (840 acres) are woodland.

== List of owners ==
- (1351) Folmer Folmersen
- (–1415) Jakob Olufsen Lunge
- (1418–1424) Jakob Andersen Lunge
- (1462) Henning Venstermand
- (1480–1500) Morten Venstermand
- (1528–1551) Jørgen Venstermand
- (1551– ) Johan Venstermand
- (–1576) Lave Venstermand
- (1576–1766) The Crown
- (1766–1785) Hans Tersling
- (1766–1789) Peder Thestrup
- (1785–1799) Kirstine Hoffgaard, gift 1) Tersling og 2) Colbiørnsen
- (1799–1805) J.E. Colbiørnsen
- (1805–1809) Jørgen Tersling
- (1809v1844) Carl Vincens Grandjean
- (1844–1861) Ludvig Grandjean
- (1861–1882) Johan Carl Wilhelm Grandjean
- (1882–1926) Johan Ludvig Grandjean
- (1926–1963) Vincens Grandjean
- (1963–2007) Susanne Grandjean, gift Brockenhuus-Schack
- (2001–present) Kim Vincens Bille Brockenhuus-Schack
