= Banneville-la-Campagne War Cemetery =

Military cemetery in Normandy

- Commonwealth War Graves Commission
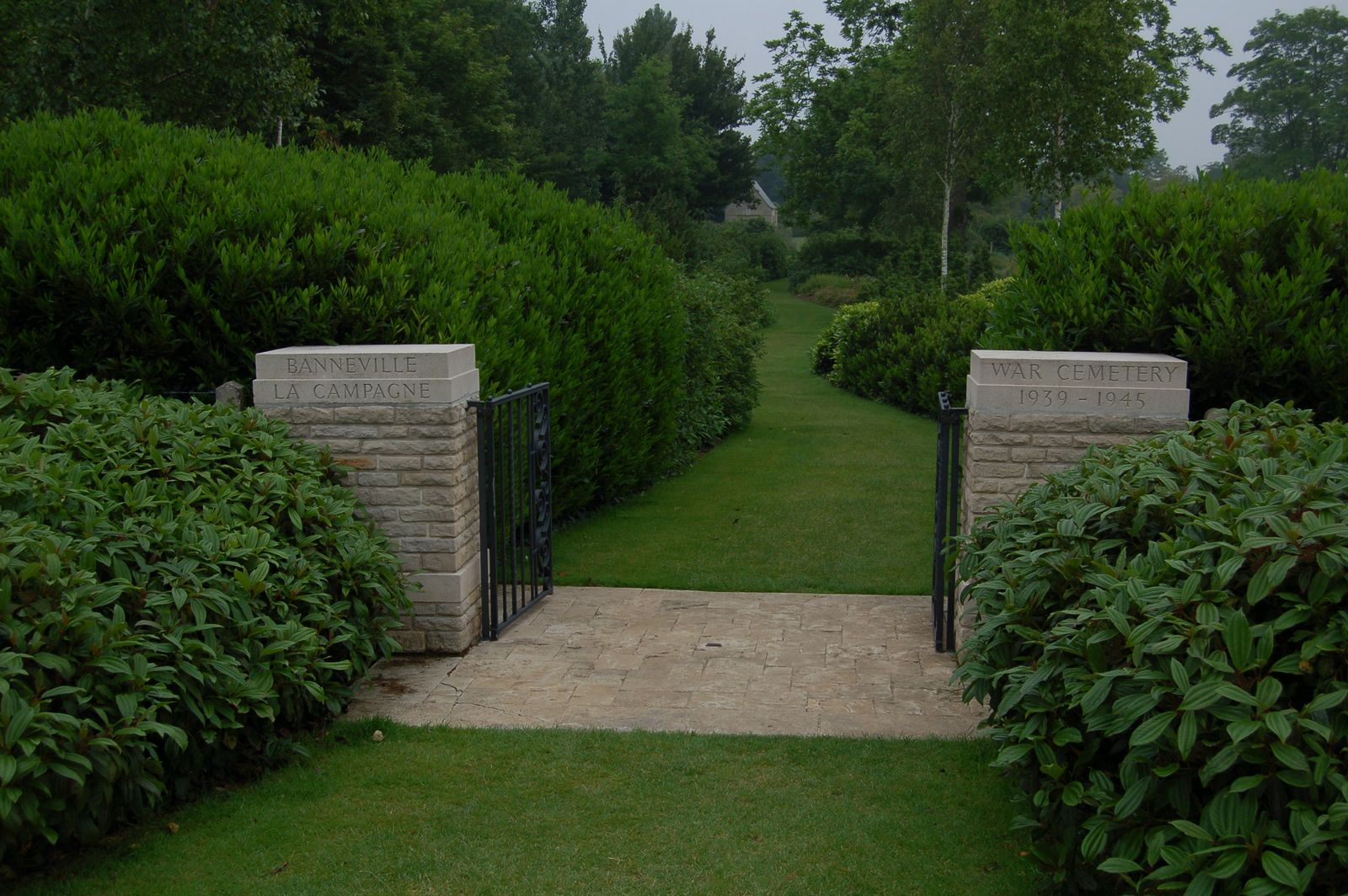
- For Operation Overlord
- Established: 1944
- Location: 49.1748°N 0.2292°W near Sannerville, Calvados, France
- Designed by: Philip D. Hepworth
- Total burials: 2,175
- Unknowns: 140

Burials by nation
- United Kingdom: 2,150 Canada: 11; Australia: 5 Poland: 5 New Zealand: 2 Unidentified: 2

Burials by war
- World War II

Banneville-la-Campagne War Cemetery is a Second World War cemetery of Commonwealth soldiers located close to the commune of Banneville-la-Campagne, 11 km (6.8 mi) east of Caen, Normandy, France. The graveyard contains 2,175 graves of which 140 are unidentified The cemetery is maintained by the Commonwealth War Graves Commission.

== History ==
During the Allies push out of the Normandy bridgeheads, Operation Goodwood and the liberation of Caen were undertaken in July 1944. During August, the Falaise Gap was closed. The majority of the soldiers interred in the cemetery date from these attacks. Of the 2,175 soldiers in this cemetery there are 2,150 Britons, 11 Canadians, 5 Australians, 2 New Zealanders, 5 Poles and two unidentified soldiers.

== Notable graves ==
- Squadron Leader Ronnie Fokes DFC DFM
- Serjeant Alan Fowler - British footballer
- Lieutenant Eddy Kahn – Dutch athlete
- Major John Thornton – British athlete
- Lieutenant Reginald John Whistler – British artist, designer and illustrator

== Location ==
The cemetery is located close to Sannerville, in the Calvados department of Normandy, on the Route de Caen (D.675). It is located 3.25 km (2.02 mi) west of Troarn.

== See also ==
- List of military cemeteries in Normandy
- American Battle Monuments Commission
- UK National Inventory of War Memorials
- German War Graves Commission
