= Constantin Zahei =

Romanian equestrian

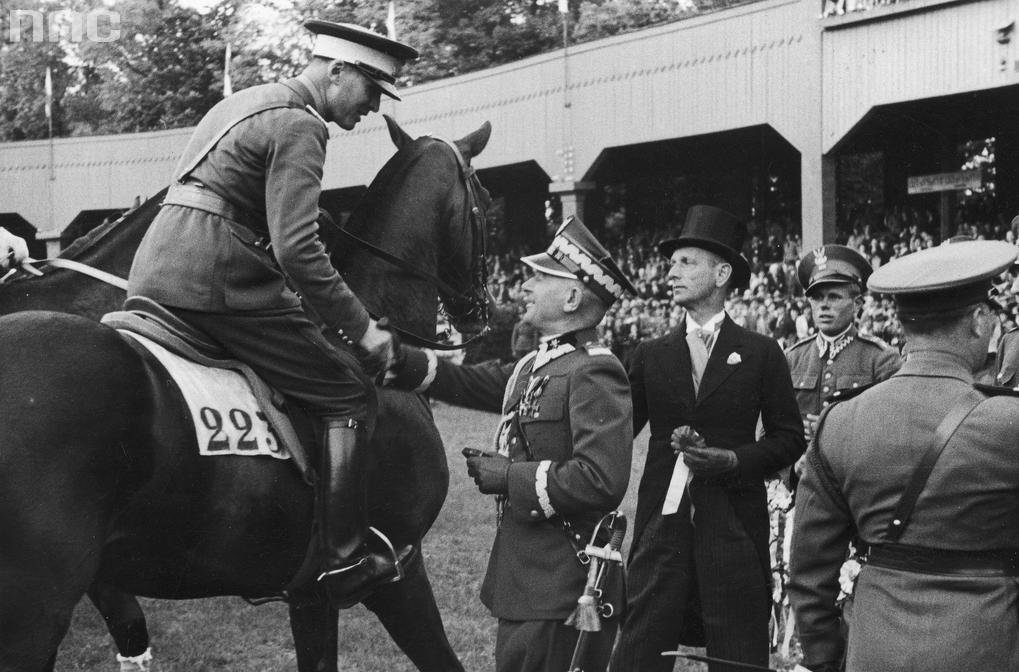

Personal information
- Nationality: Romanian
- Born: 10 September 1903; Sibiu, Austria-Hungary
- Died: 1996 (aged 92–93)

Sport
- Sport: Equestrian

Constantin Zahei (10 September 1903 – 1996) was a Romanian equestrian. He competed in the individual eventing at the 1936 Summer Olympics.
