= Karl Neumeister =

Austrian equestrian (1903–1990)

Personal information
- Nationality: Austrian
- Born: 15 August 1903
- Died: 2 October 1990 (aged 87)

Sport
- Sport: Equestrian

Karl Neumeister (15 August 1903 – 2 October 1990) was an Austrian equestrian who competed in individual eventing at the 1936 Summer Olympics.
