= Saim Polatkan =

Turkish equestrian

Personal information
- Nationality: Turkish
- Born: 10 February 1908; Malatya, Turkey
- Died: June 8, 1991 (aged 83)

Sport
- Sport: Equestrian

Saim Polatkan (10 February 1908 – 8 June 1991) was a Turkish equestrian of Ingush origin. He competed in three events at the 1936 Summer Olympics and was the flag bearer for Turkey.
