= Werner Walldén =

Finnish equestrian (1900–1989)

Personal information
- Nationality: Finnish
- Born: 1 January 1900; Suystamo, Russia
- Died: 6 March 1989 (aged 89); Helsinki, Finland

Sport
- Sport: Equestrian

Werner Walldén (1 January 1900 – 6 March 1989) was a Finnish equestrian. He competed in the individual eventing at the 1936 Summer Olympics.
