= Lőrinc Jankovich =

Hungarian equestrian

Personal information
- Nationality: Hungarian
- Born: 8 October 1907 Mezőhegyes, Austria-Hungary
- Died: 14 September 1990 (aged 82) Satu Mare, Romania

Sport
- Sport: Equestrian

Lőrinc Jankovich (8 October 1907 – 14 September 1990) was a Hungarian equestrian. He competed in two events at the 1936 Summer Olympics.

== Early life and education ==
Jankovich was born in Mezőhegyes in 1907. His father was a livestock inspector.

== Olympics ==
In the individual event of the three-day competition, Jankovich finished ninth with a score of 154.30 points on his horse "Irány". The team, consisting also of Ágoston Endrődy and István Visy withdrew due to the fall of István Visy, and finished unplaced in the team competition.

== Military service ==
Jankovich had a rank of captain. He served in Cegléd between October 2, 1931, and April 30, 1933, with the 2nd Hungarian Army Hussar Regiment.
