= Nils Sæbø =

Norwegian equestrian

Personal information
- Nationality: Norwegian
- Born: 8 May 1897 Radøy, Norway
- Died: 2 September 1985 (aged 88) Radøy, Norway

Sport
- Sport: Equestrian

Nils Sæbø (8 May 1897 – 2 September 1985) was a Norwegian equestrian. He competed in the individual eventing at the 1936 Summer Olympics.
