= Herbert Ziegler =

Austrian equestrian

Personal information
- Nationality: Austrian (until 1938); German
- Born: 8 October 1904
- Died: 25 June 1944 (aged 39); Massa Marittima, Italy

Sport
- Sport: Equestrian

Herbert Ziegler (8 October 1904 – 25 June 1944) was an Austrian, as of 1938 German equestrian and officer. He competed in the individual eventing at the 1936 Summer Olympics in Berlin.

== Life ==
Ziegler joined the cavalry of the Bundesheer and was promoted to Wachtmeister (NCO) in a dragoon regiment on 15 August 1930. On 15 August 1931, he was commissioned as a Leutnant and on 15 August 1935 was promoted to Oberleutnant.

On 14 March 1938, he was taken over by the Wehrmacht as a Rittmeister and received rank seniority (RDA) from 1 February 1938. As such he was transferred to the Kavallerie-Regiment 11 and was appointed commander (Chef) of the 1. Schwadron. Subordinated to the XVII. Armeekorps, the regiment took part in the occupation of the Sudetenland.

On 18 January 1942. he was promoted to Major with rank seniority (RDA) from 1 January 1942 and on 1 March 1944 to Oberstleutnant. Posthumously he was promoted to Oberst with rank seniority (RDA) from 1 June 1944.

== Death ==
Oberst (colonel) Ziegler, commander of the Grenadier Regiment (motorized) 361, was killed at the Italian Front on 25 June 1944. He is buried at Futa Pass Cemetery.

== Awards and decorations ==
- Bronze Medal for Services to the Republic of Austria on 11 December 1935
- Wehrmacht Long Service Award, 4th and 3rd Class
- Sudetenland Medal with the Prague Castle Bar
- Iron Cross (1939), 2nd and 1st Class
- General Assault Badge
- German Cross in Gold on 11 April 1944 as Lieutenant Colonel and commander of the Grenadier-Regiment (motorisiert) 361/90. Panzergrenadier-Division
- Honour Roll Clasp of the German Army on 25 October 1944 (posthumously)
