= Dabel =

- Municipality
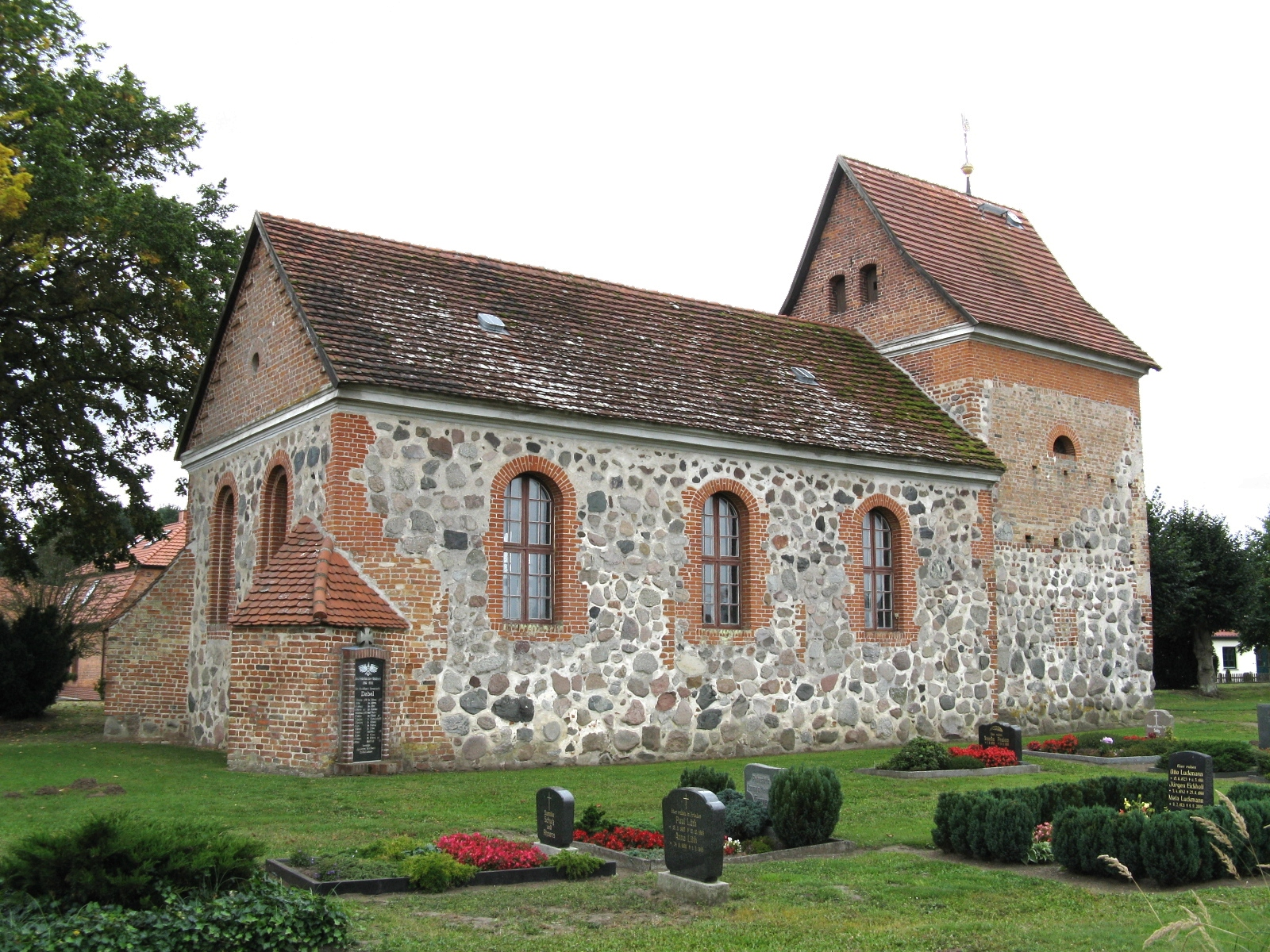
- Church

- Coat of arms

- Location of Dabel within Ludwigslust-Parchim district
- Interactive map of Dabel
- Location within Germany Location within Mecklenburg-Vorpommern
- Coordinates: 53°40′N 11°54′E
- Country: Germany
- State: Mecklenburg-Vorpommern
- District: Ludwigslust-Parchim
- Municipal assoc.: Sternberger Seenlandschaft
- Subdivisions: 4

Government
  - Mayor: Jörg Neumann (Ind.)

Area
  - Total: 24.77 km^{2} (9.56 sq mi)
- Elevation: 58 m (190 ft)

Population (2025-12-31)
  - Total: 1,379
  - Density: 55.67/km^{2} (144.2/sq mi)
- Time zone: UTC+01:00 (CET)
  - Summer (DST): UTC+02:00 (CEST)
- Postal codes: 19406
- Dialling codes: 038485
- Vehicle registration: PCH
- Website: amt-ssl.de

Dabel (German pronunciation: [ˈdaːbl̩]) is a municipality in the Ludwigslust-Parchim district, in Mecklenburg-Vorpommern, Germany.

== Notable people ==
- Ludwig Stubbendorf (1906–1941), horse rider
