= Petre Chirculescu =

Romanian equestrian

Personal information
- Nationality: Romanian
- Born: 1 October 1898; Lugoj, Austria-Hungary
- Died: 1975 (aged 76–77)

Sport
- Sport: Equestrian

Petre Chirculescu (1 October 1898 – 1975) was a Romanian equestrian. He competed in the individual eventing at the 1936 Summer Olympics.
