= Asanosuke Matsui =

Japanese equestrian

Personal information
- Nationality: Japanese
- Born: 18 June 1900

Sport
- Sport: Equestrian

Asanosuke Matsui (born 18 June 1900, date of death unknown) was a Japanese equestrian. He competed in two events at the 1936 Summer Olympics.
