= John Willems =

American equestrian

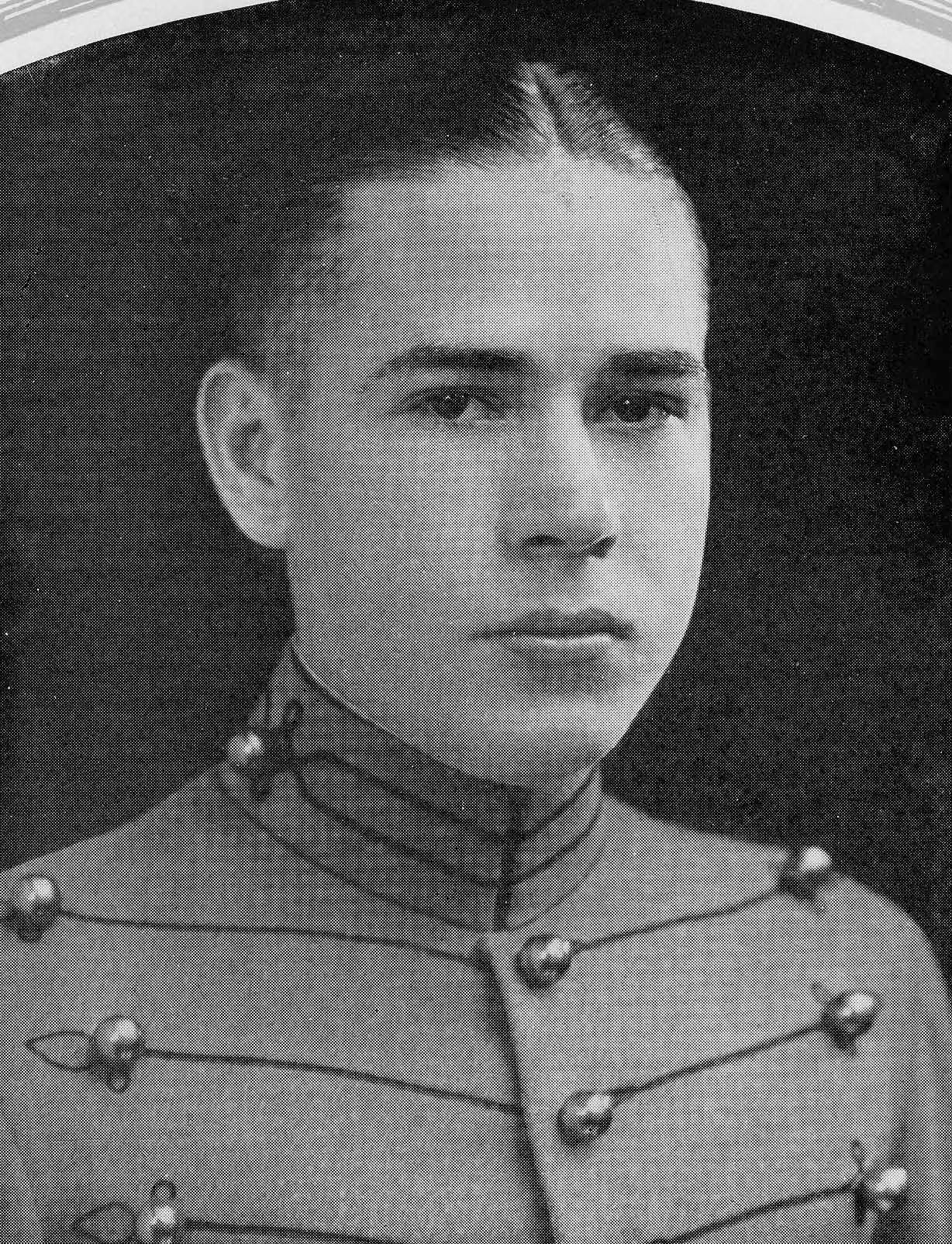
- At West Point in 1925

Personal information
- Full name: John Murphy Willems
- Born: December 24, 1901 Fort Leavenworth, Kansas, United States
- Died: September 14, 1976 (aged 74) San Diego, California, United States

Sport
- Sport: Equestrian

John Murphy Willems (December 24, 1901 – September 14, 1976) was an American equestrian. He competed in two events at the 1936 Summer Olympics. He was also an officer in the United States Army and served during World War II, eventually attaining the rank of brigadier general. From 1955 to 1956 he commanded the 3rd Armored Division.

== Biography ==
John Willems was born in Fort Leavenworth, Kansas on December 24, 1901. He graduated from the United States Military Academy at West Point in 1925.

He died in San Diego on September 14, 1976, and was buried at Fort Rosecrans National Cemetery.

Military offices
Preceded by Gordon B. Rogers	Commanding General 3rd Armored Division; 1955–1956	Succeeded by Robert W. Porter Jr.
