= Pierre Mange =

Swiss equestrian

Personal information
- Nationality: Swiss
- Born: 20 September 1905
- Died: 20 March 1992 (aged 86)

Sport
- Sport: Equestrian

Pierre Mange (20 September 1905 – 20 March 1992) was a Swiss equestrian. He competed in two events at the 1936 Summer Olympics.
