= Giuseppe Chiantia =

Italian equestrian

Personal information
- Nationality: Italian
- Born: 1 January 1893; Riesi, Italy
- Died: 10 April 1971 (aged 78)

Sport
- Sport: Equestrian

Giuseppe Chiantia (1 January 1893 – 10 April 1971) was an Italian equestrian. He competed in two events at the 1936 Summer Olympics.
