= Josef Dobeš =

Czech equestrian

Personal information
- Nationality: Czech
- Born: 4 July 1904; Přezletice, Austria-Hungary
- Died: 28 September 1985 (aged 81); Prague, Czechoslovakia

Sport
- Sport: Equestrian

Josef Dobeš (4 July 1904 – 28 September 1985) was a Czech equestrian. He competed in two events at the 1936 Summer Olympics.
