= Václav Procházka (equestrian) =

Czech equestrian (1904–1985)

Personal information
- Nationality: Czech
- Born: 23 September 1904; Jílovec (part of Fulnek), Austria-Hungary
- Died: 24 April 1985 (aged 80); Pardubice, Czechoslovakia

Sport
- Sport: Equestrian

Václav Procházka (23 September 1904 – 24 April 1985) was a Czech equestrian. He competed in two events at the 1936 Summer Olympics.
