= Mark Jankovich =

South African entrepreneur

- Born: 1969
- Occupations: Entrepreneur and philanthropist
- Known for: Delphis Eco

Mark Jankovich (born 1969) is a British entrepreneur and philanthropist who is known for being the founder of sustainable cleaning brand, Delphis Eco.

== Biography ==
Jankovich was born in South Africa. He moved to London in 1992 and worked for Merrill Lynch, Coutts & Co and RBS before starting his environmentally friendly cleaning chemicals company Delphis Eco in 2007. Having seen the damage that toxic cleaning products were having on the environment, he developed plant-based cleaning materials and designed the products to use recycled 100% high-density polyethylene plastic packaging. According to The Independent, Delphis Eco is the first brand in the UK to make its packaging entirely from domestic recycled plastic milk bottles. As of 2021, the company was cited as being a £5 million company. It is also a B-Corp with EU ecolabel accreditation and two Royal Warrants.

Jankovich is also the creator of Recycled Plastic Rating (RPR) mark, a rating of the recycled plastic content that the company uses in the packaging of their products. In September 2019, he launched the RPR mark in the UK’s House of Commons during Greta Thunberg's Climate Strike.

Jankovich has served three prime ministers of UK as a member of the UK government’s Cabinet Office SME Advisory Panel since 2017.

== Awards and recognition ==
Jankovich was awarded Leader of the Year award at Made in Britain Impact Awards. He was recognized for his leadership in sustainable manufacturing initiatives in the business and in the sector. He was one of the finalists for the Grocer’s Entrepreneur of the Year Award and was recognized in the ScottishPower’s COP26 Green Power List.
