= Carl Raguse =

American equestrian

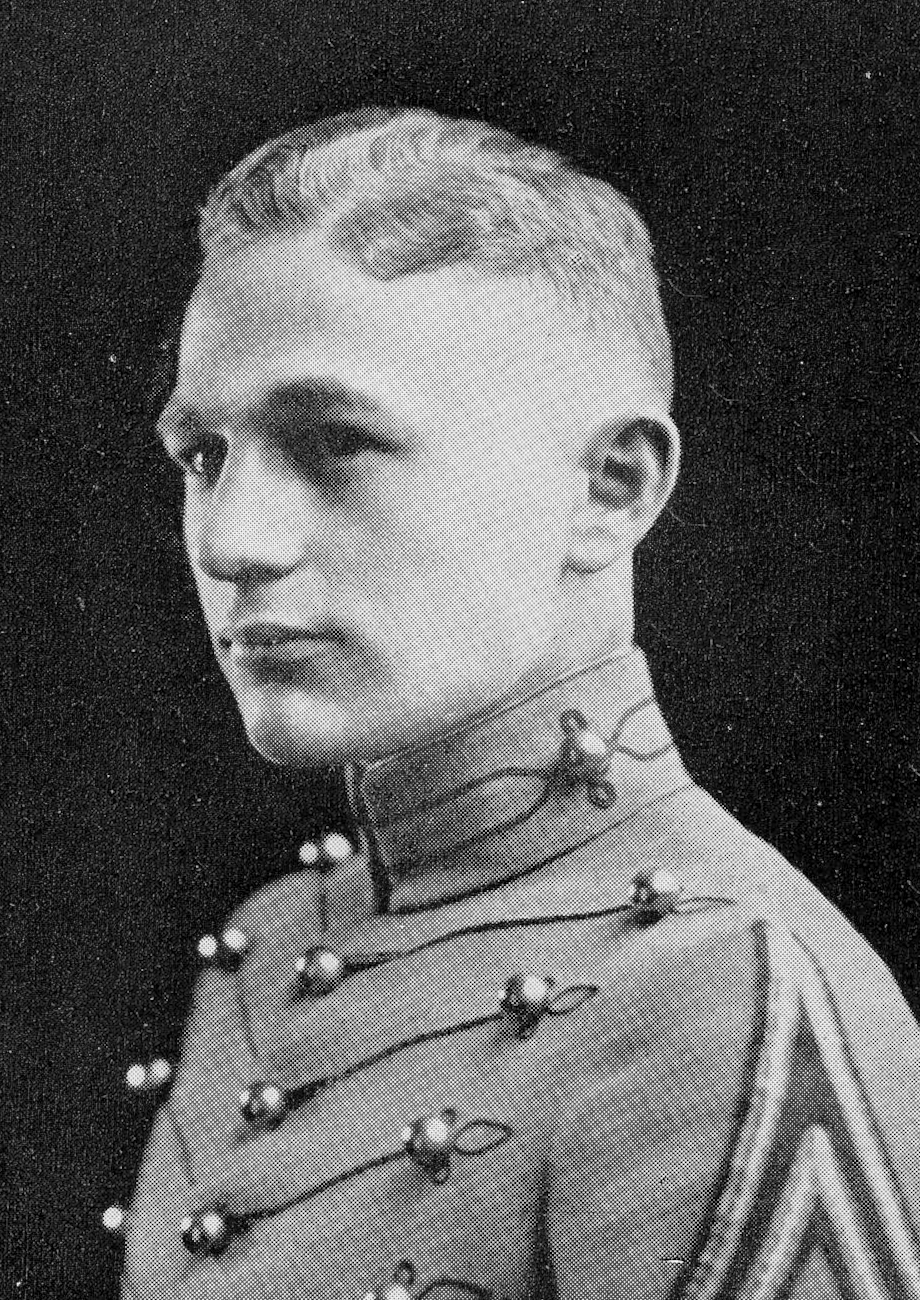
- At West Point in 1924

Personal information
- Full name: Carl William Albert Raguse
- Born: March 19, 1902 Auburn, New York, United States
- Died: March 1, 1988 (aged 85) San Antonio, Texas, United States

Sport
- Sport: Equestrian

Carl William Albert Raguse (March 19, 1902 – March 1, 1988) was an American equestrian. He competed in two events at the 1936 Summer Olympics.

== Biography ==
Carl Raguse was born in Auburn, New York on March 19, 1902. He graduated from the United States Military Academy at West Point in 1924.

He died in San Antonio, Texas on March 1, 1988.
