= Ranieri, Count Di Campello =

Italian equestrian (1908–1959)

Personal information
- Nationality: Italian
- Born: 21 September 1908 Campello sul Clitunno, Italy
- Died: 29 May 1959 (aged 50) Rome, Italy
- Spouse(s): Margherita Vare (m. 1932) Maria Sole Agnelli (m. 1953)
- Children: 6

Sport
- Sport: Equestrian

Ranieri, Count Di Campello (21 September 1908 – 29 May 1959) was an Italian equestrian. He competed in two events at the 1936 Summer Olympics and was a distant relative of the famous Napoleon Bonaparte.

He married in 1932 Margherita Varé (they had a son and a daughter), and, after his first wife's death, Maria Sole Agnelli (1925–2025, sister of Gianni Agnelli), they had three daughters and a son.

He was Mayor of Campello sul Clitunno from 1952 until his death.
