= Janković =

Janković (Cyrillic: Јанковић, pronounced [jǎːŋkoʋitɕ]) is a Serbo-Croatian surname, a patronymic derived from Janko. It is found in Serbia, Croatia, Bosnia and Herzegovina and Montenegro. Notable people with the surname include:

- Aleksandar Janković (born 1972), Serbian football coach
- Alojzije Janković (born 1983), Croatian chess player
- Boban Janković (1963–2006), Serbian basketball player
- Boško Janković (born 1984), Serbian footballer
- Božidar Janković (general) (1849-1920), Serbian army general and commander
- Božidar Janković (footballer) (1951-1993), Serbian Yugoslav footballer
- Božo Janković (1951–1993), Sarajevo-born Serbian footballer
- Filip Janković (born 1995), Serbian footballer
- Ines Janković (born 1983), Serbian fashion designer
- Janko Janković (born 1963), Croatian retired footballer
- Jelena Janković (born 1985), Serbian tennis player
- Joseph Jankovic, American neurologist
- Jovana Janković (born 1981), Serbian TV presenter, currently with RTS
- Kenjo Janković (1797–1861), Montenegrin warrior and military leader
- Ljubinka Janković (born 1958), Serbian handball player
- Marko Janković (sprinter) (born 1976), Serbian Olympic sprinter
- Marko Janković (footballer, born 1995), Montenegrin football midfielder
- Marko Janković (journalist), Serbian journalist, disc jockey, politician, and radio and television presenter
- Marc Janko (born 1983), Austrian footballer
- Mihailo Janković (1911–1976), Serbian architect
- Miki Janković (born 1994), Serbian tennis coach and former tennis player
- Milan Janković or Philip Zepter, a Serbian entrepreneur
- Milan Janković (footballer, born 1959), Serbian football midfielder
- Milan Janković (politician), Serbian politician
- Mimi Mercedez (born Milena Janković, 1992), Serbian rapper and songwriter
- Nataša Janković (born 1991), Croatian female handball player
- Nenad Janković (born 1962), birth name of Serbian musician and TV personality Nele Karajlić
- Niko Janković (born 2001), Croatian footballer
- Nikola Janković (football) (born 1993), Serbian footballer
- Nikola Janković (basketball) (born 1994), Serbian basketball player
- Nikola Janković (sculptor) (1926–2017), Serbian sculptor
- Nikola Janković (icon painter) (fl. 19th c.), Serbian icon painter and woodcarver from Macedonia
- Radivoje Janković (1889–1949), adjutant general of King Peter II of Yugoslavia
- Siniša Janković (born 1978), Serbian footballer
- Boban Janković (Slobodan Janković, 1963–2006), Yugoslavian basketball player
- Slobodan Janković (footballer, born 1946), Yugoslavian/ Serbian midfielder
- Slobodan Janković (footballer, born 1981), Serbian football goalkeeper for Mladost Lučani
- Stefan Janković (basketball) (born 1993), Serbian basketball player
- Stefan Janković (footballer) (born 1997), Serbian footballer
- Stojan Janković (1636–1687), Serbian military commander in Venetian service
- Stole Janković (1925–1987), Serbian film director
- Svetlana Velmar-Janković (1933–2014), Serbian writer
- Vladeta Janković (born 1940), politician, diplomat, former chief foreign policy adviser to Serbian Prime Minister Vojislav Koštunica
- Vladimir Velmar-Janković (1895–1976), Serbian writer
- Vlado Janković, Serbian-born Greek professional basketball player, known in Greece as Vladimiros "Vlanto" Giankovits
- Vladimir Janković (football), Serbian football (soccer) manager and former player
- Zoran Janković (politician) (born 1953), Slovenian businessman and politician
- Zoran Janković (footballer) (born 1974), Serbian-born Bulgarian football manager and former player
- Zoran Janković (water polo) (1940–2002), Yugoslavian water polo player
- Zoran "Bajo" Janković, Macedonian musician best known as the bassist for Aleksandar Makedonski

== See also ==
- Jankovič
- Jankovići, a village in the Cetinje Municipality, Montenegro
