= Alan Fowler (footballer) =

English footballer

Personal information
- Date of birth: 20 November 1911
- Place of birth: Rothwell, England
- Date of death: 10 July 1944 (aged 32)
- Place of death: Martot, France
- Height: 5 ft 6 in (1.68 m)
- Position: Striker

Youth career
- Whitehall Printers
- 1927–1933: Leeds United
- → Whitehall Printers (loan)
- → Brodsworth Main (loan)

Senior career*
Years	Team	Apps	(Gls)
1933–1934	Leeds United	15	(8)
1934–1944	Swindon Town	173	(67)
1939–1940	→ Swindon Town (war guest)	28	(18)
1943	→ Queens Park Rangers (war guest)	1	(0)
1944	→ Watford (war guest)	6	(0)
Total		223	(93)
- * Club domestic league appearances and goals

Alan Fowler (20 November 1911 – 10 July 1944) was an English professional footballer who played for Whitehall Printers, Brodsworth Main, Leeds United, Swindon Town, Queens Park Rangers and Watford, as a striker. He was killed in action during the Second World War.

== Personal ==
Fowler was son of Joseph Fowler and his wife Phyllis May.

== Military career ==
Fowler enlisted in the Dorsetshire Regiment of the British Army in 1940, and rose to become a PT instructor with the rank of sergeant. In 1941, Fowler was commended for saving three men's lives in a grenade accident.

His battalion, the 4th Battalion of the Dorsetshire Regiment, part of the 43rd (Wessex) Infantry Division, arrived in France on 24 June and was involved in Operation Jupiter, the attack on the city of Caen. On 10 July 1944, Fowler's battalion was ordered to attack the villages of Eterville and Martot. During this operation, Fowler was killed by a friendly aerial bombardment coordinated by 4 Hawker Typhoons. Fowler, who left a widow, Emily Mae, who lived in Swindon, is buried at Banneville-la-Campagne War Cemetery.

== See also ==
- List of footballers killed during World War II
