= Amaury de la Moussaye =

French equestrian

Personal information
- Nationality: French
- Born: 5 November 1900; Lyon, France
- Died: 2 August 1973 (aged 72)

Sport
- Sport: Equestrian

Amaury de la Moussaye (5 November 1900 – 2 August 1973) was a French equestrian. He competed in two events at the 1936 Summer Olympics.
