= Khristo Malakchiev =

Bulgarian equestrian

Personal information
- Nationality: Bulgarian
- Born: 6 June 1902

Sport
- Sport: Equestrian

Khristo Malakchiev (Bulgarian: Христо Малакчиев; born 6 June 1902, date of death unknown) was a Bulgarian equestrian. He competed in two events at the 1936 Summer Olympics.
