= Eddy Kahn =

Dutch equestrian

Personal information
- Nationality: Dutch
- Born: 11 December 1906; The Hague, Netherlands
- Died: 19 August 1944 (aged 37); Normandy, German-occupied France

Sport
- Sport: Equestrian

Eddy Kahn (11 December 1906 – 19 August 1944) was a Dutch equestrian. He competed in two events at the 1936 Summer Olympics. He was killed in action during the Second World War.

== Personal life ==
He was the son of Leon and Paula Wilhelmine Kahn Emmerich, of Kneuterdijk, The Hague, Holland. Kahn served with the British Army as a lieutenant in the Royal Welch Fusiliers during the Second World War. He was killed in action while serving with the 6th Battalion, Royal Welch Fusiliers, part of the 53rd (Welsh) Infantry Division, during the Battle of Normandy on 19 August 1944. Kahn is buried in Banneville-la-Campagne War Cemetery.
