= Niels Erik Leschly =

Danish officer and equestrian

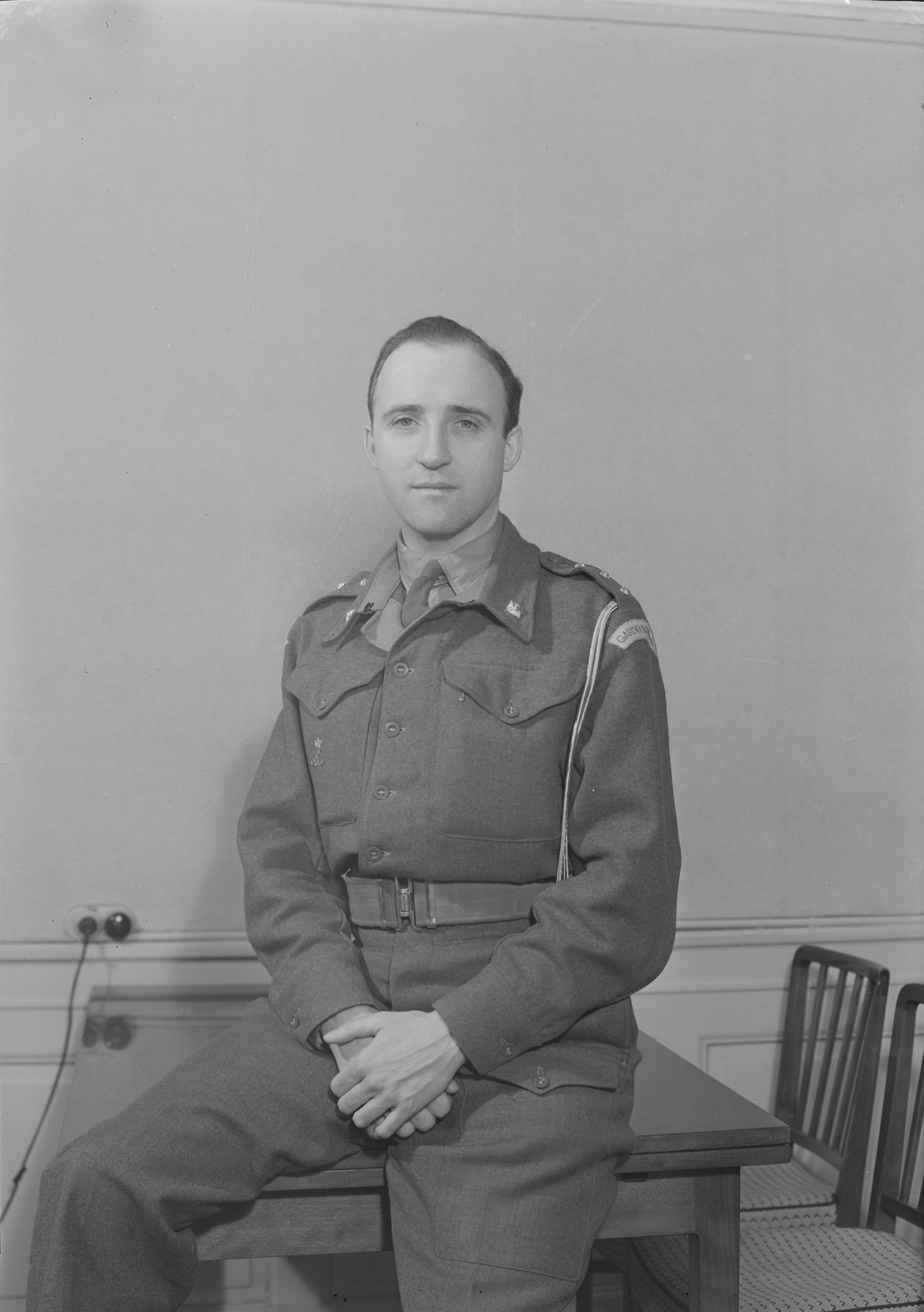
- Leschly as ritmester
- Born: 23 February 1910; Gentofte, Denmark
- Died: 2 November 1986 (aged 76); Gentofte, Denmark
- Website: Sports career
- Country: Denmark
- Sport: Equestrian
- Event: 1936 Summer Olympics

Niels Erik Leschly (23 February 1910 – 2 November 1986) was a Danish equestrian. He competed in two events at the 1936 Summer Olympics.
