= Mario Mylius =

Swiss equestrian

Personal information
- Nationality: Swiss
- Born: 21 October 1912
- Died: 13 January 1980 (aged 67)

Sport
- Sport: Equestrian

Mario Mylius (21 October 1912 – 13 January 1980) was a Swiss equestrian. He competed in two events at the 1936 Summer Olympics.
