= Dino Ferruzzi =

Italian equestrian

Personal information
- Nationality: Italian
- Born: 31 August 1892 Montefiascone, Italy

Sport
- Sport: Equestrian

Dino Ferruzzi (born 31 August 1892, date of death unknown) was an Italian equestrian. He competed in two events at the 1936 Summer Olympics.
