= Manabu Iwahashi =

Japanese equestrian

Personal information
- Nationality: Japanese
- Born: 10 February 1908

Sport
- Sport: Equestrian

Manabu Iwahashi (born 10 February 1908, date of death unknown) was a Japanese equestrian. He competed in four events at the 1936 Summer Olympics.
