= Georges Margot =

French equestrian

Personal information
- Nationality: French
- Born: 30 May 1902 Versailles, France
- Died: 5 October 1998 (aged 96) Allonnes, France

Sport
- Sport: Equestrian

Georges Marie Frederic Margot (French: [ʒɔʁʒ maʁɡo]; 30 May 1902 – 5 October 1998) was a French equestrian. He competed in two events at the 1936 Summer Olympics.
