= Vincens Grandjean =

Danish equestrian

Personal information
- Nationality: Danish
- Born: 18 September 1898 Guldborgsund, Denmark
- Died: 19 April 1970 (aged 71) Guldborgsund, Denmark

Sport
- Sport: Equestrian

Vincens Grandjean (18 September 1898 – 19 April 1970) was a Danish equestrian. He competed in two events at the 1936 Summer Olympics.

== Biography ==
Grandjean grew up on the Vennerslund estate on Falster. He owned it from 1940.
