= Seweryn Kulesza =

Polish equestrian (1900–1983)

Olympic medal record

Men's Equestrian
Silver medal – second place	1936 Berlin	Team eventing

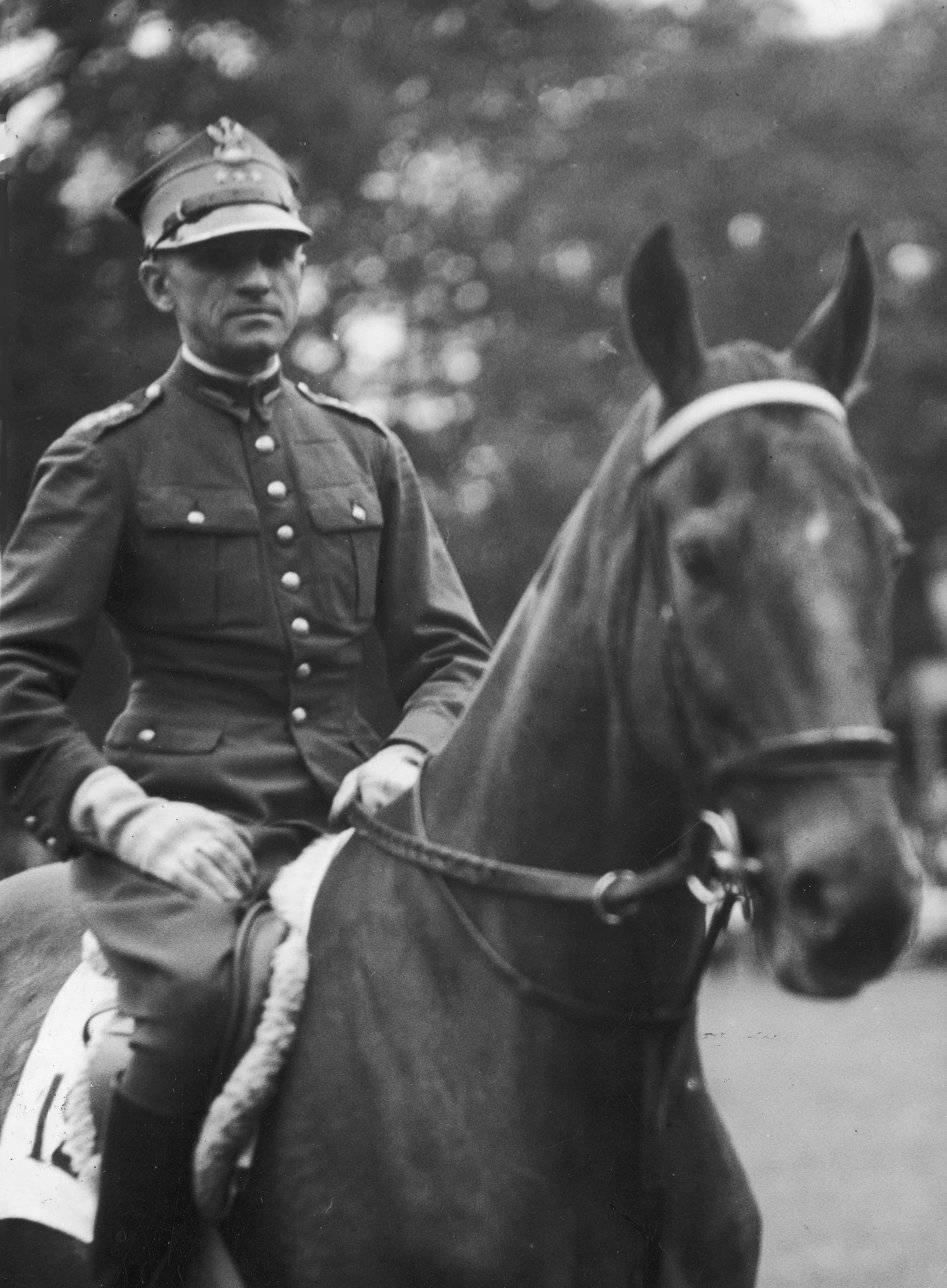
Seweryn Kulesza and Abd el Krim; Warsaw 1936

Seweryn Roman Kulesza (23 October 1900 in Radom – 14 May 1983 in Los Angeles, United States) was a Polish horse rider who competed in the 1936 Summer Olympics.

In 1936 he and his horse Tóska won the silver medal as part of the Polish eventing team, after finishing 21st in the individual eventing competition.

During WWII he took part in the Polish September Campaign, where he was captured by the Germans and spent the rest of the war in Oflag VII-A Murnau.
