= Hans Lunding =

Danish colonel (1899–1984)

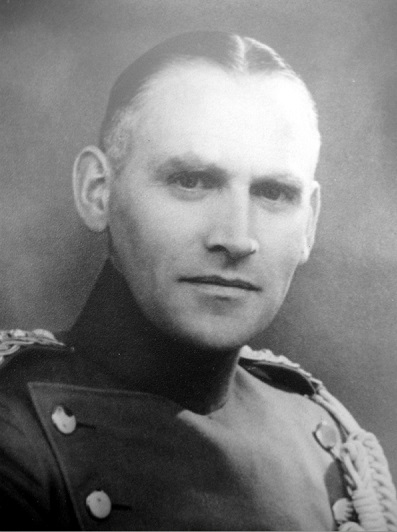
- Lunding in 1932
- Born: Hans Mathiesen Lunding; 25 February 1899; Stepping, German Empire
- Died: 5 April 1984 (aged 85); Århus, Denmark
- Military career
- Branch: Imperial German Army; Royal Danish Army
- Rank: Colonel
- Commands: Chief of Defence Intelligence Service
- Sports career
- Country: Denmark
- Sport: Equestrian
Medal record
Equestrian
Olympic Games
Representing Denmark
Bronze medal – third place	1936 Berlin	Eventing, Individual

Hans Mathiesen Lunding (25 February 1899 – 5 April 1984) was a Danish military officer, eventing rider, resistance fighter and director of military intelligence in Denmark.

== Life ==
He was born on 25 February 1899 in Stepping, Germany, the son of a small farmer in the then-Prussian Nordschleswig. In 1916 he was drafted during the First World War into the Prussian army. After basic training, he went to the 2nd Guards Uhlan Regiment, where he held a non-commissioned officer degree at the end of the war.

From 1919 to 1920, Lunding worked as a gendarmerie officer at the International Commission for the Supervision of Referendums in North and Middle Schleswig (CIS).

Lunding joined the Danish Army in 1922, became a lieutenant in the 3rd Dragoon Regiment in Aarhus in 1927, and passed the Riding School from 1928 to 1929. He completed the General Staff Course from 1933 to 1935 and was adjutant to the General Inspector of Cavalry from 1935 to 1936. After he received the promotion to Captain in 1937, he moved to the General Staff, where he worked during the next six years in the news department as a deputy head of department.

At the 1936 Summer Olympics in Berlin, Lunding won the bronze medal in eventing with his horse "Janus".

== Second World War ==
In the days before the German attack on Denmark and Norway on 9 April 1940 Lunding was on the German-Danish border and was able to observe the deployment of German troops. Lunding reported his observations to Copenhagen, but the Danish government did not dare to take countermeasures.

Upon the dissolution of the Danish Army and the Danish Fleet (Operation Safari) on 29 August 1943, Lunding was arrested by the Gestapo. He was accused of illegally going to Stockholm several times to contact British and Polish intelligence officers, which was true. Lunding was transferred to Berlin, where the Gestapo chief Heinrich Müller told him that he had been sentenced to death, with Himmler personally deciding on the time and manner of execution.

After nearly a year in the Gestapo Prison in Prinz-Albrecht-Strasse, Berlin, Lunding was transferred to the prison of the Flossenbürg concentration camp, where for some time he was a cell neighbour of arrested Chief of Defence, Admiral Wilhelm Canaris. The two were able to communicate by knocking, and Lunding thus became the last person with whom Canaris was in contact prior to his execution on 9 April 1945. As the Allied advance approached Flossenbürg, the inmates, including many prominent individuals, were transferred to the Dachau concentration camp. In the last days of the war Lunding was one of the 139 special 'Prominenten' prisoners who were transported by the SS from Dachau to Villabassa in South Tyrol. On 29 April the German inmate Colonel Bogislaw von Bonin succeeded in placing the group under the protection of a Wehrmacht unit led by Captain Wichard von Alvensleben. A few days later, the group surrendered to American troops.

== Post-war ==
Returning to Denmark, Lunding rejoined the Danish army and was promoted to Lieutenant Colonel. From 1945 to 1950 he was liaison officer of the Danish government to the British military government in the Schleswig region, and from 1950 until his retirement in 1963 he was - now promoted to Colonel - the first head of the combined army and naval intelligence services in Denmark.

He died on 5 April 1984 in Aarhus, Denmark, aged 85.

== Bibliography ==
- Vilhelm la Cour et al.: Danmark under Besættelsen. Band I-III. Copenhagen 1945. (Danish)
- H.M. Lunding, Otto Lippert: Stemplet fortroligt. Copenhagen 1970. (Danish) ISBN 87-00 02002-8.
- Hans Christian Bjerg: Ligaen. Den danske militære efterretningstjeneste 1940–1945. Copenhagen 1985. (Danish) ISBN 87-01-20352-5.
