= Ludwig Stubbendorf =

German equestrian

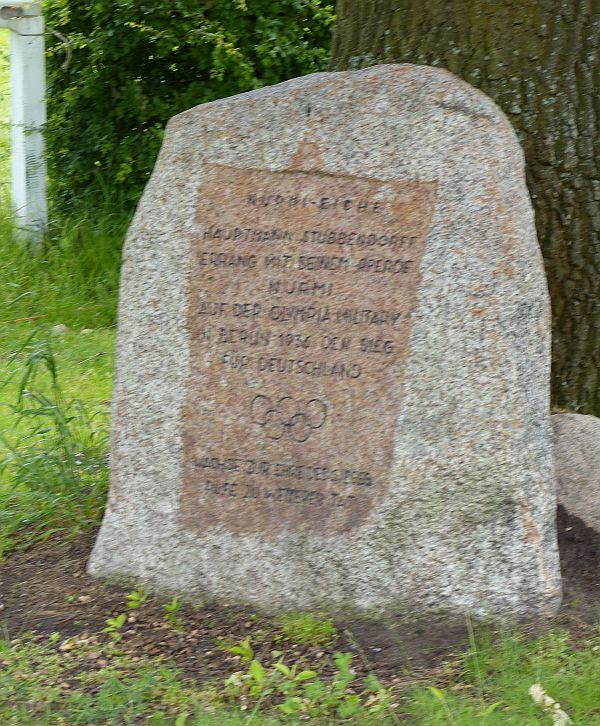

Personal information
- National team: Germany
- Born: Ludwig Stubbendorf; 24 February 1906 Turloff, German Empire
- Died: 17 July 1941 (aged 35) Bykhov, Reichskommissariat Ostland
Medal record
Men's Equestrian
Representing Germany
Olympic Games
Gold medal – first place	1936 Berlin	Individual eventing
Gold medal – first place	1936 Berlin	Team eventing

Ludwig Stubbendorf (24 February 1906 – 17 July 1941) was a German horse rider who competed in the 1936 Summer Olympics. In 1936, he and his horse Nurmi won the gold medal in the individual eventing competition as well as in the team eventing.

Both Stubbendorf and his horse Nurmi took part in World War II, as part of the 1st Cavalry Brigade during the Nazi invasion of Poland in 1939. Both rider and horse were killed in July 1941, during the Nazi invasion of the USSR.
