= Richard Fanshawe (equestrian) =

British equestrian

Olympic medal record

Men's Equestrian
| Bronze medal – third place | 1936 Berlin | Team eventing |

Richard Gennys Fanshawe (22 June 1906 – 14 April 1988) was a British horse rider who competed in the 1936 Summer Olympics.

== Early life ==
He was born at Rathmore, Naas, Kildare, third son of Lieutenant-General Edward Arthur Fanshawe (1859–1952), K.C.B., of the Royal Artillery, and Frances Rose, daughter of Sir James Macaulay Higginson, K.C.B., Governor of British Mauritius from 1851 to 1857, formerly Governor of Antigua 1847 to 1850. His middle name, 'Gennys', derived from the marriage on 6 December 1769 of Captain Robert Fanshawe, R.N. to Christiana, daughter of John Gennys, of Whitleigh Hall, Devon, and had been given to members of the Fanshawe family including his grand-uncle Admiral Edward Gennys Fanshawe (1814–1906), Commander-in-Chief, Portsmouth.

== Career ==
Fanshawe had a military career in the cavalry; he attained the rank of Major in the 16th/5th Lancers.

In 1936 he and his horse Bowie Knife won the bronze medal as part of the British eventing team, after finishing 26th in the individual eventing competition.

== Personal life ==
In 1932 Fanshawe married Ruth Violet Mary, daughter of Sir Walter Farquhar, 5th Baronet, and maternal granddaughter of Thomas Bateson, 1st Baron Deramore. Before they divorced in 1961, they had two sons:

- David Fanshawe (1933–2012), a Colonel in the Grenadier Guards.
- Brian Fanshawe (1936–2019), who served as a captain in the 9th/12th Royal Lancers; "an exceptional horseman", he was also Master of the Cottesmore Hunt. Brian's son James Fanshawe is a racehorse trainer.

In 1963 Fanshawe married secondly Araby Diana, daughter of Philip Ransom. Together, they were the parents of one son:

- Richard Fanshawe (b. 1964).

Fanshawe died at Cheltenham.
