= Ágoston Endrődy =

Hungarian equestrian

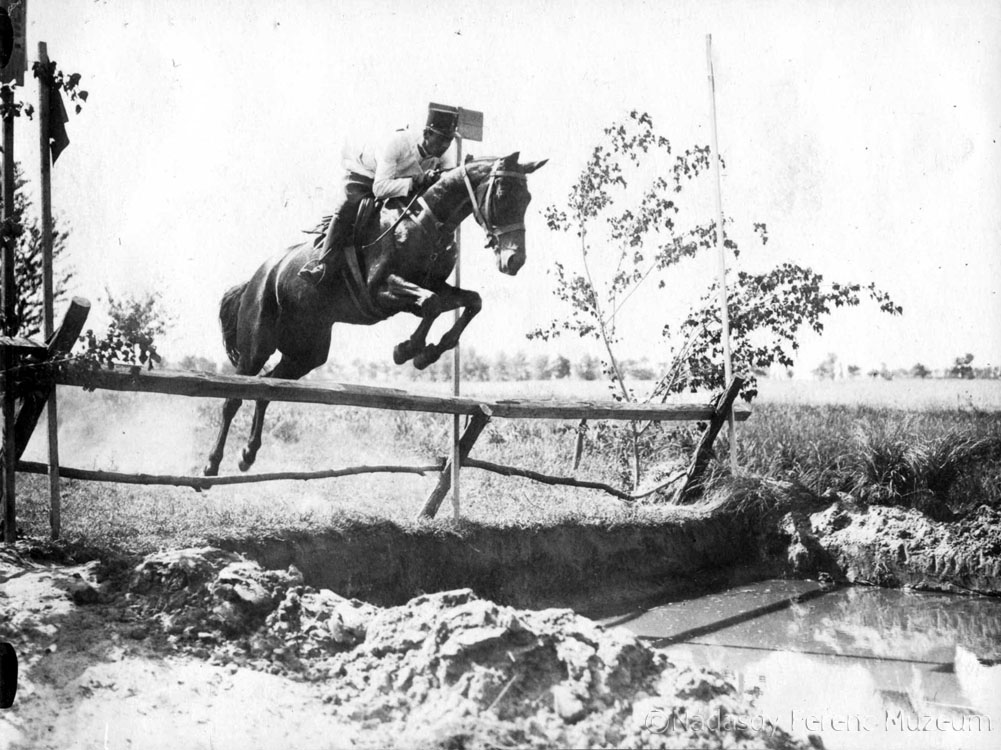

Personal information
- Nationality: Hungarian
- Born: 13 October 1902; Nógrádverőce, Austria-Hungary
- Died: 1990 (aged 87–88); Zurich, Switzerland

Sport
- Sport: Equestrian

Ágoston Endrődy (13 October 1902 – 1990) was a Hungarian equestrian. He competed in two events at the 1936 Summer Olympics.
