= Petar Angelov (equestrian) =

Bulgarian equestrian

Personal information
- Nationality: Bulgarian
- Born: 27 March 1897

Sport
- Sport: Equestrian

Petar Angelov (Bulgarian: Петър Ангелов; born 27 March 1897, date of death unknown) was a Bulgarian equestrian. He competed in two events at the 1936 Summer Olympics.
