= Zdzisław Kawecki =

Polish equestrian (1902–1940)

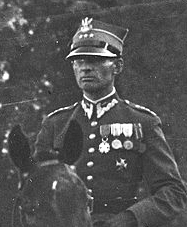
- Zdzisław Kawecki in 1937

Medal record

Men's Equestrian

Olympic Games
Silver medal – second place	1936 Berlin	Team eventing

Zdzisław Szczęsny Kawecki-Gozdawa (21 May 1902 in Husiatyn – April 1940 in Katyn) was a Polish horse rider who competed in the 1936 Summer Olympics.

In 1936 he and his horse Bambino won the silver medal as part of the Polish eventing team, after finishing 18th in the individual eventing competition.

Kawecki was killed by Soviet forces in the Katyn massacre in April 1940, aged 37.
