= Todor Semov =

Bulgarian equestrian

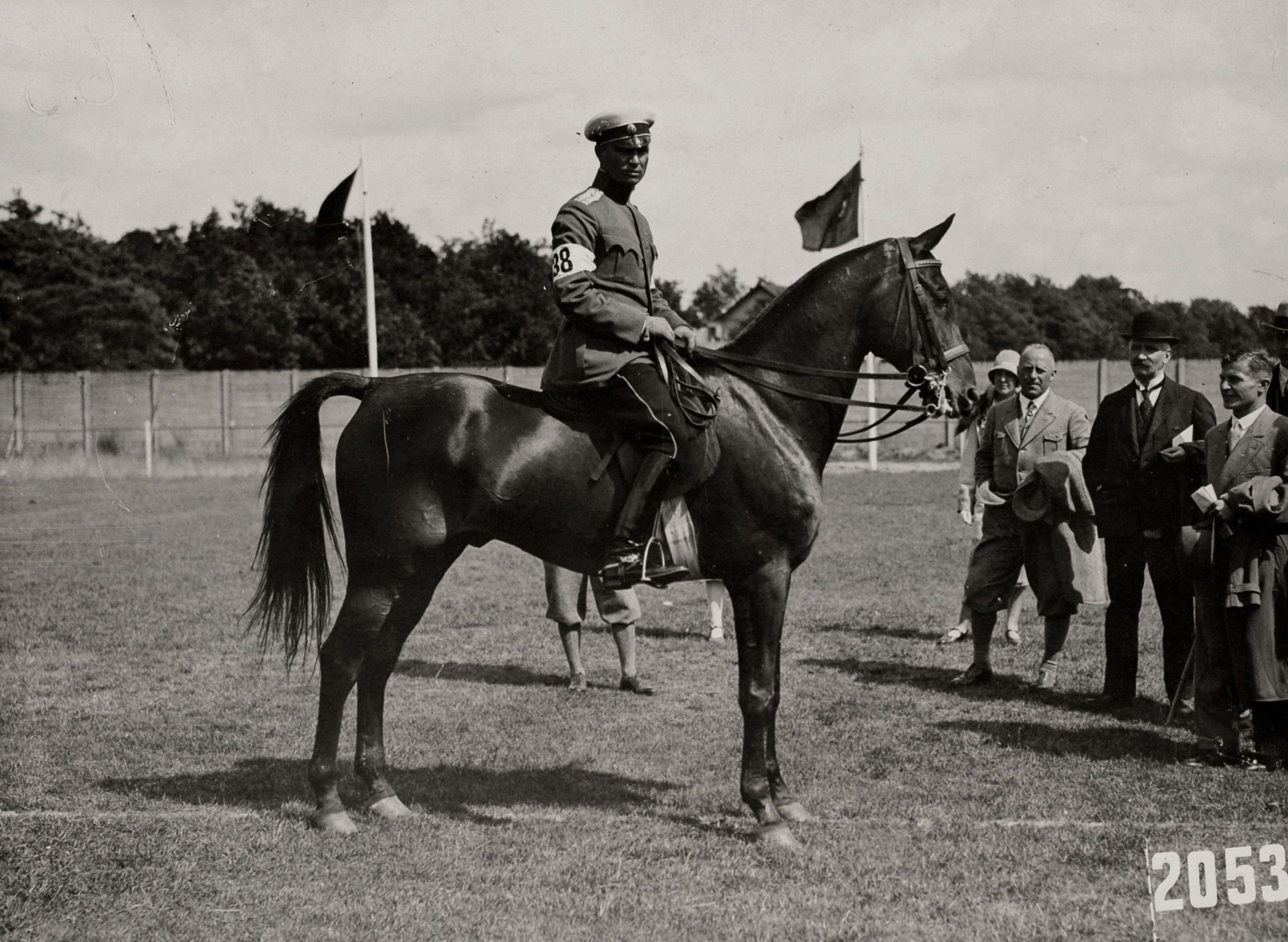

Personal information
- Nationality: Bulgarian
- Born: 20 January 1898

Sport
- Sport: Equestrian

Todor Semov (Bulgarian: Тодор Семов; born 20 January 1898, date of death unknown) was a Bulgarian equestrian. He competed at the 1928 Summer Olympics and the 1936 Summer Olympics.
