= Edward Howard-Vyse =

British Army General and equestrian

Lieutenant-General Sir Edward Howard-Vyse KBE CB MC
- Born: 27 November 1905; Edinburgh, Scotland
- Died: 26 December 1992 (aged 87); Langton, North Yorkshire, England
- Burial place: St Andrew Churchyard, Langton, North Yorkshire, England
- Military career
- Allegiance: United Kingdom
- Branch: British Army
- Service years: 1927–1964
- Rank: Lieutenant-General
- Service number: 33342
- Unit: Royal Artillery
- Commands: Western Command
- Conflicts: World War II
- Awards: Knight Commander of the Order of the British Empire; Companion of the Order of the Bath; Military Cross

Olympic medal record

Men's Equestrian
Bronze medal – third place	1936 Berlin	Team eventing

Lieutenant-General Sir Edward Dacre Howard-Vyse KBE CB MC (27 November 1905 – 26 December 1992) was a senior British Army officer as well as a British horse rider who competed in the 1936 Summer Olympics.

He was the younger son of Colonel Cecil Howard-Vyse of Langton Hall, Malton, North Yorkshire.

== Career ==
Edward Howard-Vyse was commissioned into the Royal Artillery in 1927.

In 1936 he and his horse Blue Steel won the bronze medal as part of the British eventing team, after finishing 19th in the individual eventing competition.

He served in World War II and was promoted to major in 1942.

After the War he took office as director of Royal Artillery from 1959 to 1961 and then General Officer Commanding-in-Chief of Western Command from 1961 to 1964. He retired in 1964.

He was also Colonel Commandant of the Royal Artillery from 1962 until 1970.

== Family ==
In 1940 he married Mary Bridget Willoughby and together they went on to have two sons and a daughter.

He died in Ryedale in 1992.

Military offices
Preceded by Sir William Stirling	GOC-in-C Western Command; 1961–1964	Succeeded by Sir Richard Craddock
