= Rudolf Lippert =

German equestrian

Personal information
- Born: 29 October 1900 Leipzig
- Died: 1 April 1945 (aged 44) near Bielefeld
- Military career
- Allegiance: Nazi Germany
- Branch: Army
- Rank: Generalmajor
- Commands: 5. Panzer-Division
- Conflicts: World War II
- Awards: Knight's Cross of the Iron Cross
Medal record
Men's Equestrian
Representing Germany
Olympic Games
| Gold medal – first place | 1936 Berlin | Team eventing |

Rudolf Lippert (29 October 1900 – 1 April 1945) was a German horse rider who competed in the 1936 Summer Olympics. He was also a recipient of the Knight's Cross of the Iron Cross during World War II.

In 1936 he and his horse Fasan won the gold medal as part of the German eventing team in the team eventing competition after finishing sixth in the individual eventing competition.

== Awards ==
- Knight's Cross of the Iron Cross on 9 June 1944 as Oberst and commander of Panzer-Regiment 31

Military offices
| Preceded by General der Panzertruppe Karl Decker | Commander of 5. Panzer-Division; 16 October 1944 – 5 February 1945 | Succeeded by Generalmajor Günther Hoffmann-Schönborn |
