= Henryk Leliwa-Roycewicz =

Polish equestrian (1898–1990)

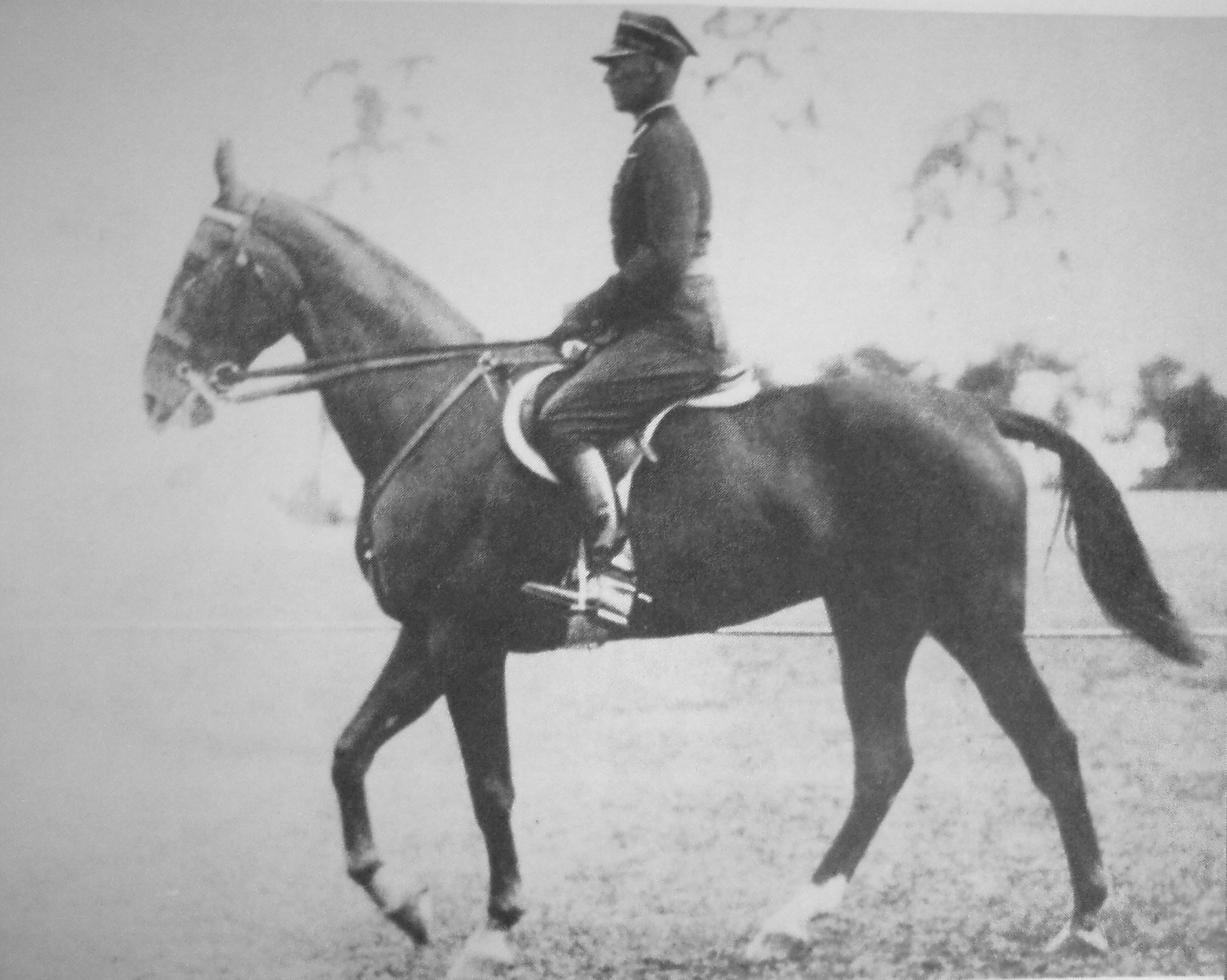
- Henryk Leliwa-Roycewicz at the 1936 Summer Olympics in Berlin.

Medal record

Men's Equestrian
Silver medal – second place	1936 Berlin	Team eventing

Henryk Leliwa-Roycewicz (30 July 1898 in Janopol, Ryki County – 18 June 1990 in Warsaw) was a Polish Major of the Cavalry and horse rider who competed in the 1936 Summer Olympics.

In 1936 he and his horse Arlekin III (translated as Harlequin III in English) won the silver medal as part of the Polish eventing team, after finishing 15th in the individual eventing competition.

Leliwa-Roycewicz was a career officer of the Cavalry of the Polish Army. He fought in the September Campaign of World War II. After Polish defeat he joined the Home Army and later commanded one of the battalions during the Warsaw Uprising. After the war he was a victim of a communist show trial, sentenced for 6 years as a political prisoner of the communist regime.

He was awarded the Virtuti Militari and the Order of Polonia Restituta. Leliwa-Roycewicz was buried at the Powązki Military Cemetery in Warsaw.
