= Carl-Adam Stjernswärd =

Swedish equestrian

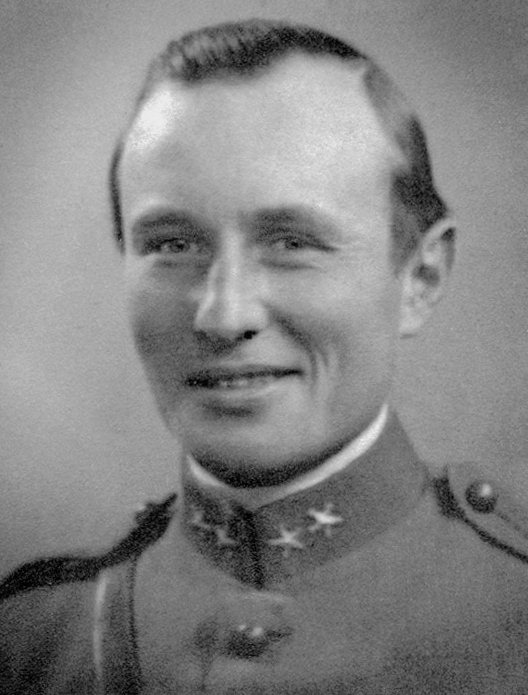

Personal information
- Born: 20 July 1905 Vittskövle, Kristianstad, Sweden
- Died: 18 March 1981 (aged 75) Skanör, Sweden

Sport
- Sport: Horse riding
- Club: K2 IF, Helsingborg

Carl-Adam Nolcken Stjernswärd (20 July 1905 – 18 March 1981) was a Swedish Army officer and horse rider. He competed in eventing at the 1936 Summer Olympics and placed 11th individually.

Stjernswärd became major in the reserve in 1948.

== Awards and decorations ==
- (Sweden) Knight of the Order of the Sword (1950)
