= Konrad Freiherr von Wangenheim =

German equestrian

Olympic medal record

Equestrian
Gold medal – first place	1936 Berlin	Team eventing

Konrad Freiherr von Wangenheim (20 August 1909 in Hanover – 28 January 1953) was a German army Cavalry officer, a horse rider who competed at the 1936 Summer Olympics in Berlin, securing a gold medal for the German equestrian team whilst suffering from a broken collarbone.

== Biography ==
In 1936 he and his horse Kurfürst won the gold medal as part of the German eventing team in the team eventing competition after finishing 24th in the individual eventing competition.

Wangenheim became a Captain (Rittmeister) with Cavalry Regiment No. 8 (Reiter-Regiment 8, later renamed Kavallerie-Regiment 8) garrisoned at Brieg in Silesia. The squadron of which Wangenheim was a member was stationed in Namslau.

In July 1944, while serving as a German Army officer on the Eastern Front during the Second World War, he was captured by the Red Army. After being held as a prisoner of war for several years, while awaiting repatriation to Germany from the Soviet Union, in 1953 he was found hanged in Stalingrad, Russia. He may have committed suicide.

He was the father of the professional fashion photographer Chris von Wangenheim.
