= István Visy =

Hungarian equestrian

Personal information
- Nationality: Hungarian
- Born: 1 August 1906; Dombóvár, Austria-Hungary
- Died: 6 March 2000 (aged 93); Salzburg, Austria

Sport
- Sport: Equestrian

István Visy (1 August 1906 – 6 March 2000) was a Hungarian equestrian. He competed in two events at the 1936 Summer Olympics.
