= Henri Saint Cyr =

Swedish equestrian (1902–1979)

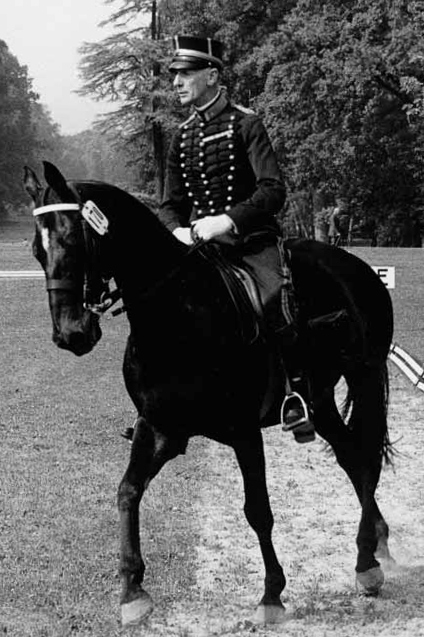
- Born: Henri Julius Reverony Saint Cyr; 15 March 1902; Stockholm, Sweden
- Died: 27 July 1979 (aged 77); Kristianstad, Sweden
- Military career
- Branch: Swedish Army
- Service years: 1924–1957
- Rank: Major

Olympic medal record

Equestrian

Representing Sweden
Gold medal – first place	1952 Helsinki	Dressage, individual
Gold medal – first place	1952 Helsinki	Dressage, team
Gold medal – first place	1956 Stockholm	Dressage, individual
Gold medal – first place	1956 Stockholm	Dressage, team

Henri Julius Reverony Saint Cyr (15 March 1902 – 27 July 1979) was a Swedish officer and equestrian. Competing in five consecutive Olympics, he won two gold medals in dressage in 1952, and two gold medals in 1956.

== Early life ==
Saint Cyr was born on 15 March 1902 in Stockholm, Sweden, the son of Lieutenant Esaias Saint Cyr and his wife Tyra (née Andersson).

== Military career ==
Saint Cyr was commissioned as an officer in 1924 and was assigned as a second lieutenant to Svea Artillery Regiment (A 1) the same year. He attended the Artillery and Engineering College from 1926 to 1928 when he was promoted to lieutenant. Saint Cyr then attended the Army Riding School from 1928 to 1929, from 1931 to 1932 and from 1934 to 1936. He served as a teacher at the Army Riding School from 1936 to 1940 and he was promoted to captain in 1938. Saint Cyr became major in 1944 and attended the Saumur Cavalry School in France from 1948 to 1950. He was transferred to the reserve in 1957.

== Sports career ==
He competed at five consecutive Olympics from 1936 to 1960 and won two gold medals in 1952 and two in 1956, all in individual and team dressage. At his last Olympics in 1960 he finished fourth in the individual dressage.

Saint Cyr was the national champion in eventing in 1935, 1937, and 1939 and won a world title in the individual dressage in 1953. He took the Olympic Oath at the 1956 Games in Stockholm.

Saint Cyr was a board member of the Swedish Equestrian Federation (Svenska ridsportens centralförbund) from 1932 to 1948 and from 1950 to 1959.

== Personal life ==
In 1921 he married Ruth Constantin-Peterson (1904–1966), the daughter of Bror Constantin-Peterson, a chief physician, and Sophie Psilanderskjöld. He was the father of Madeleine (born 1930) and Guy (born 1934).

== Awards and decorations ==
- (Sweden) Knight of the Order of the Sword (1944)
- (Sweden) H. M. The King's Medal
- (France) Knight of the Legion of Honour

== Dates of rank ==
- 1924 – Second lieutenant
- 1928 – Lieutenant
- 1938 – Captain
- 1944 – Major
