= Henri Pernot du Breuil =

French equestrian

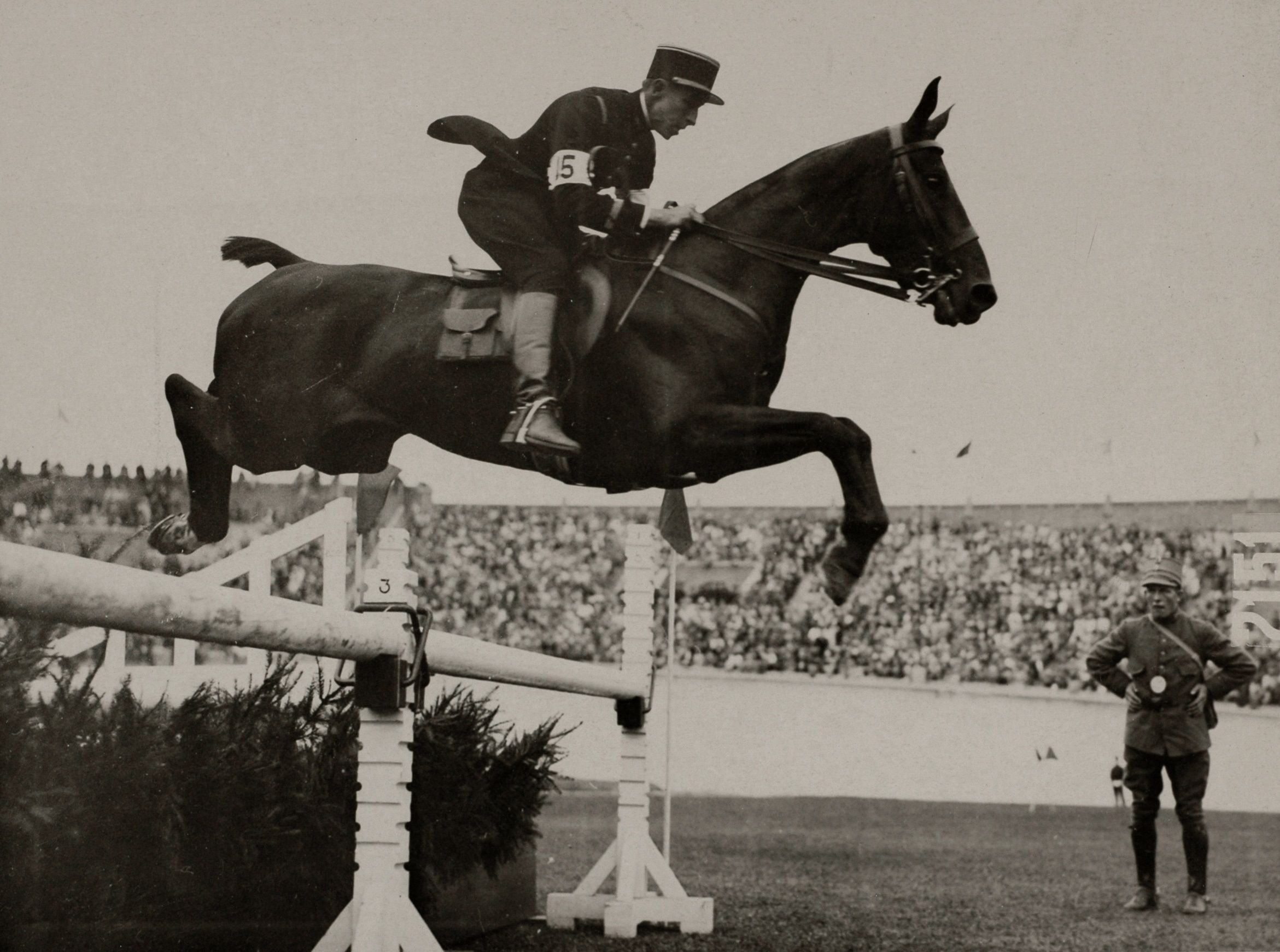

Personal information
- Nationality: French
- Born: 24 February 1899 Mirecourt, France
- Died: 11 September 1982 (aged 83) Louveciennes, France

Sport
- Sport: Equestrian

Henri Pernot du Breuil (24 February 1899 – 11 September 1982) was a French equestrian. He competed at the 1928 Summer Olympics and the 1936 Summer Olympics.
