= Hans Moser (rider) =

Swiss equestrian

Medal record

Equestrian

Representing Switzerland

Olympic Games
Gold medal – first place	1948 London	Dressage, individual

Hans Moser (19 January 1901 – 18 November 1974) was a Swiss equestrian and Olympic champion. He won an individual gold medal in dressage at the 1948 Summer Olympics in London.
