= Christiaan Tonnet =

Equestrian and modern pentathlete

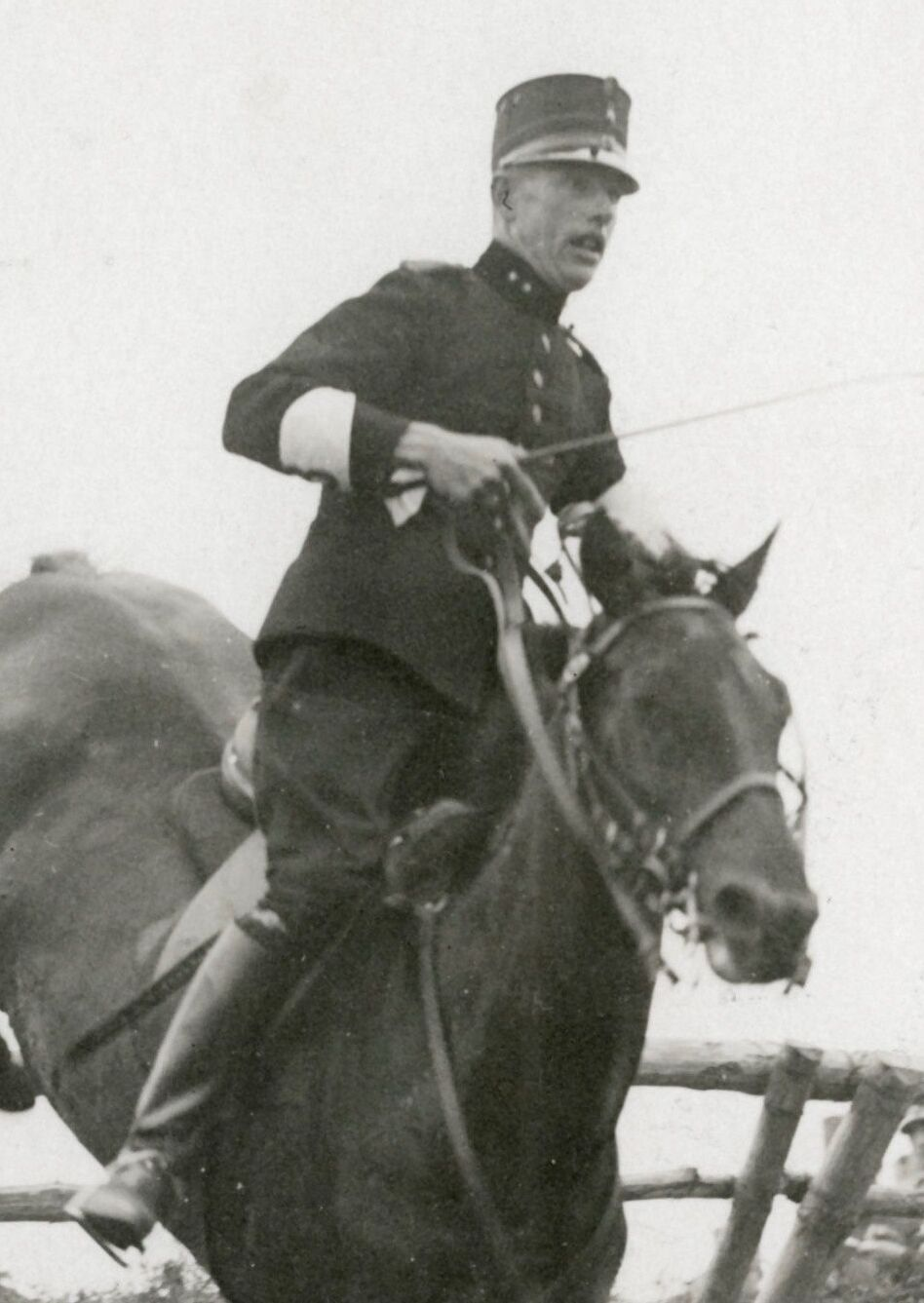
- Christiaan Tonnet (1928)

Personal information
- Born: 23 February 1902 The Hague, Netherlands
- Died: 14 November 1946 (aged 44) Schiphol, Netherlands

Sport
- Sport: Equestrian, modern pentathlon

Christiaan Tonnet (23 February 1902 – 14 November 1946) was a Dutch equestrian and modern pentathlete. He competed in the pentathlon at the 1924 and 1928 Summer Olympics and in the equestrian events at the 1936 Summer Olympics.
