= Alec Scott =

British equestrian (1906–1978)

Alexander Brassey Jonathan Scott MC
- Born: 16 October 1906
- Died: 11 June 1978 (aged 71)
- Military career
- Allegiance: United Kingdom
- Branch: British Army
- Rank: Major
- Unit: 5th Royal Inniskilling Dragoon Guards
- Conflicts: World War II
- Awards: Military Cross

Olympic medal record

Men's Equestrian
Bronze medal – third place	1936 Berlin	Team eventing

Alexander Brassey Jonathan Scott MC (16 October 1906 – 11 June 1978) was a British horse rider who competed in the 1936 Summer Olympics.

In 1936 he and his horse Bob Clive won the bronze medal as part of the British eventing team, after finishing seventh in the individual eventing competition.

Scott attended the Royal Military College, Sandhurst. In World War II, he joined the 5th Royal Inniskilling Dragoon Guards. He was awarded the Military Cross in the King's 1940 Birthday Honours.
