= Jankovič =

Jankovič (West Slavic feminine form: Jankovičová) is a surname found among the Czechs and the Slovaks as well as the Slovenes.

Notable people with the surname include:

- Branislav Jankovič (born 1991), Slovak ice hockey player
- Franc Jankovič (1871–1934), Slovene politician
- Jozef Jankovič (1937–2017), Slovak sculptor, painter and graphic artist
- Milan Jankovič (1929–2019), Czech literary historian
- Peter Jankovič (born 1980), Slovak basketball coach

== See also ==
- Kamila Janovičová, Czech actress
