= Equestrian events at the 1936 Summer Olympics =

Equestrian at the Games of the XI Olympiad
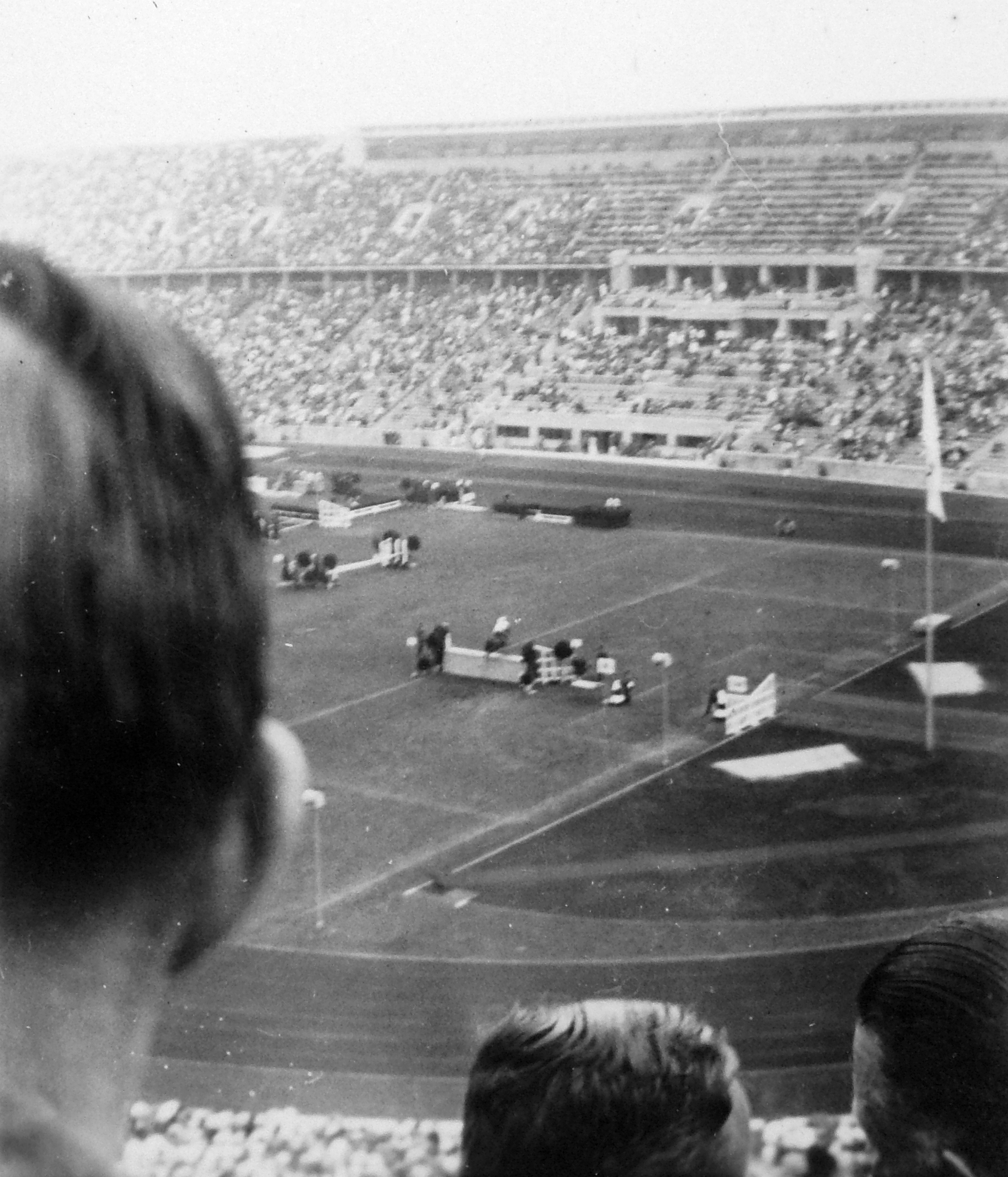
- Show jumping at the Olympiastadion
- Venue: Döberitz; Mayfield, Berlin; Olympiastadion
- Dates: 12–16 August 1936
- No. of events: 6
- Competitors: 127 from 21 nations

The equestrian events at the 1936 Berlin Summer Olympics included dressage, eventing, and show jumping. All three disciplines had both individual and team competitions. The host country, Germany, had a stellar year, winning both individual and team gold in every equestrian event, as well as individual silver in dressage. The competitions were held from 12 to 16 August 1936. Moderately priced tickets meant huge crowds at all equestrian events, with 15,000–20,000 spectators at any time during the dressage competition, 60,000 on the endurance day of eventing, and 120,000 for the Nations Cup in jumping.

There were 127 riders total (133 entries) from 21 nations (Austria, Belgium, Bulgaria, Czechoslovakia, Denmark, Finland, France, Germany, Great Britain, Hungary, Italy, Japan, Netherlands, Norway, Poland, Portugal, Romania, Sweden, Switzerland, Turkey, and the United States). Seven countries (Czechoslovakia, France, Germany, Hungary, the Netherlands, Sweden, and the USA) fielded 3-person teams for all three disciplines. Of those 127 riders, only two were civilians: a Dutch eventer and a jumper rider from Norway. The majority of horses were German (24/133) or French-bred (23/133), with 25 coming that were either British or Irish-bred (it is thought 17 from Ireland and 8 Britain), 8/133 US-bred (all on the US team, in addition to one French-bred horse), and the Japanese riders using 2 Japanese, 2 Australian, 1 British and 1 French-bred horse.

== Disciplines ==
=== Jumping ===
54 riders from 18 nations competed in the jumping competition, with only 38 riders finishing the first round. Course designer August Andreae built a 1050 meter long course of 13 fences/20 jumping efforts at 1.30–1.60 meters in height. It included one double and three triple combinations and a 5-meter water jump. The jump-off course raised many fences, widened the water to 5.50 meters, and altered some of the distances between fences. Germany won its fifth equestrian gold medal in the Nations Cup. The individual medal placements required two jump-offs: the first to decide gold and silver between 2 riders who had only 1 knockdown up to that point. The second to determine bronze between 3 riders with 2 knock downs each.

=== Dressage ===
The dressage competition had 29 riders from 11 nations, with the youngest rider, Heinz Pollay (age 28) winning individual gold. The 17-minute test had 22 movements, and was fought out between the Germans and the French, each with their own views of correct training. Both the individual gold and individual silver medal horses, Kronos and Absinth respectively, were originally trained by Otto Lörke. The youngest horse was 7-year-old Revue, and 5 of the horses competing, including the gold-medal winner Kronos, were only 8 years of age. There were also older horses competing, including 18-year-old Csintalan.

=== Eventing ===
50 riders from 19 nations contested the eventing competition, but only 4 of the 14 nations fielding a team would finish, some with incredibly high penalty points. Germany won both individual and team gold medals, and there is some speculation as to whether, as the home nation, they knew some of the pitfalls of the cross-country course that the other teams did not. Three obstacles on the course designed by August Andreae would have been removed under today's standards of competition, especially after the heavy rain that fell the day before the endurance phase. Germany won with 676 points, Poland finishing second with 991 points. Britain finished third with 9,195 points, after one of their riders fell on cross-country and his horse had to be caught (the penalty clock continued to run, and with no time limit, the team just continued to rack up penalty points). Czechoslovakia finished fourth with 18,952 points, after Capt Kawecki fell (breaking 2 ribs) and his loose horse had to be caught, and Otomar Bureš took nearly 3 hours to complete the course resulting in him accruing 18,130.70 penalty points.

The dressage test was 13 minutes in length. The 36 km endurance course included a 7 km Roads and Tracks (Phase A) to be completed in 29 min 10 sec, followed by a 12-obstacle, 4 km steeplechase (6 min 40 sec optimum time), then Phase C (15 km Roads and Tracks in 62 min, 30 sec). The cross-country (Phase D) was an 8 km, 35-obstacle course with an optimum time of 17 min and 46 seconds. Phase E was a 2 km gallop in 6 minutes. The jumping phase had obstacles with a maximum height of 1.15 meters, width of 1.50 meters, and a water jump 3.5 meters wide.

== Controversy ==
The 1936 Olympics produced controversial results, with the Germans winning all 6 gold medals, the only time in Olympic history where one team has made a clean sweep. One incident occurred on the cross-country course in the eventing competition, where the 4th fence, a 3 ft post-and-rail dropping into a pond, produced a great number of falls. The landing was much deeper than anticipated and the footing underneath did not hold up well.

It should also be of note that future Lieutenant Colonel (and 1932 Olympic gold medal holder) Takeichi Nishi participated in this event, but Nishi fell off his horse Uranus mid-course. There is speculation the accident was concocted for the benefit of host country Nazi Germany, with whom Japan would sign the 1940 Tripartite Pact, forming the Axis powers. Lieutenant Colonel Nishi would go on to command a tank regiment in the Battle of Iwo Jima. Uranus remained alive throughout the war, but his fate is unknown.

== Medal summary ==
Event	Gold	Silver	Bronze
Individual dressage	Heinz Pollay on Kronos; Germany	Friedrich Gerhard on Absinth; Germany	Alois Podhajsky on Nero; Austria
Team dressage	Germany; Heinz Pollay on Kronos; Friedrich Gerhard on Absinth; Hermann von Oppeln-Bronikowski on Gimpel	France; André Jousseaume on Favorite; Gérard de Ballorre on Debaucheur; Daniel Gillois on Nicolas	Sweden; Gregor Adlercreutz on Teresina; Sven Colliander on Kål XX; Folke Sandström on Pergola
Individual eventing	Ludwig Stubbendorf on Nurmi; Germany	Earl Foster Thomson on Jenny Camp; United States	Hans Lunding on Jason; Denmark
Team eventing	Germany; Ludwig Stubbendorf on Nurmi; Rudolf Lippert on Fasan; Konrad Freiherr von Wangenheim on Kurfürst	Poland; Henryk Roycewicz on Arlekin III; Zdzisław Kawecki on Bambino; Seweryn Kulesza on Tóska	Great Britain; Alec Scott on Bob Clive; Edward Howard-Vyse on Blue Steel; Richard Fanshawe on Bowie Knife
Individual jumping	Kurt Hasse and Tora; Germany	Henri Rang and Delfis; Romania	József von Platthy and Sellő; Hungary
Team jumping	Germany; Kurt Hasse and Tora; Marten von Barnekow and Nordland; Heinz Brandt and Alchimist	Netherlands; Johan Greter and Ernica; Jan de Bruine and Trixie; Henri van Schaik and Santa Bell	Portugal; José Beltrão and Biscuit; Domingos de Sousa and Merle Blanc; Luís Mena e Silva and Fossette

== Participating nations ==
A total of 127 horse riders from 21 nations competed at the Berlin Games:

- Austria (8)
- Belgium (3)
- Bulgaria (3)
- Czechoslovakia (9)
- Denmark (4)
- Finland (1)
- France (9)
- Germany (9)
- Great Britain (6)
- Hungary (9)
- Italy (6)
- Japan (4)
- Netherlands (9)
- Norway (6)
- Poland (6)
- Portugal (3)
- Romania (5)
- Sweden (9)
- Switzerland (6)
- Turkey (4)
- United States (8)

== Medal table ==
Rank	Nation	Gold	Silver	Bronze	Total
1	Germany	6	1	0	7
2	France	0	1	0	1
2	Netherlands	0	1	0	1
2	Poland	0	1	0	1
2	Romania	0	1	0	1
2	United States	0	1	0	1
7	Austria	0	0	1	1
7	Denmark	0	0	1	1
7	Great Britain	0	0	1	1
7	Hungary	0	0	1	1
7	Portugal	0	0	1	1
7	Sweden	0	0	1	1
Totals (12 entries)		6	6	6	18

== Officials ==
Appointment of officials was as follows:

Dressage

- (Sweden) Cl. von Cederström (Ground Jury President)
- (France) Albert-Eugène-Édouard Decarpentry (Ground Jury Member)
- (Netherlands) Jhr. Karel F. Quarles van Ufford (Ground Jury Member)
- Germany Maximilian von Poseck (Ground Jury Member)
- (Austria) A. von Henikstein (Ground Jury Member)

Jumping

- (United States) Guy Vernor Henry (Ground Jury President)
- (Japan) Kohei Yusa (Ground Jury Member)
- (Portugal) Col. Latino (Ground Jury Member)
- (United Kingdom) Cuthbert Lucas (Ground Jury Member)
- Hungary Lajos von Malanotti (Ground Jury Member)
- Germany August Andrese (Course Designer)

Eventing

- (Belgium) Gaston de Trannoy (Ground Jury President)
- Germany Gustav Rau (Ground Jury Member)
- (Italy) Piero Dodi (Ground Jury Member)
- (Poland) Michał Antoniewicz (Ground Jury Member)
- (Switzerland) Albert Mylius (Ground Jury Member)
