= Equestrian at the 1948 Summer Olympics – Individual eventing =

Equestrian at the Olympics

Individual eventing at the Games of the XIV Olympiad
- Venue: Aldershot (Dressage, Jumping); Tweseldown Racecourse (Cross-country)
- Date: 10–13 August 1948
- Competitors: 45 from 16 nations

Medalists
1st place, gold medalist(s)		Bernard Chevallier	France
2nd place, silver medalist(s)		Frank Henry	United States
3rd place, bronze medalist(s)		Robert Selfelt	Sweden

The individual eventing in equestrian at the 1948 Olympic Games in London was held in the town of Aldershot and at the Tweseldown Racecourse from 10 to 13 August. Bernard Chevallier of France won the gold medal. Frank Henry, from the United States, won silver and Robert Selfelt, from Sweden, took bronze. The team and individual eventing competitions used the same scores. Eventing consisted of a dressage test, a cross-country test, and a jumping test.

== Results ==
=== Standings after dressage ===
Rank	Rider	Horse	Nation	Dressage
1	André Jousseaume	Gigolo	France	-78.00
2	Tony Bühler	Amour Amour	Switzerland	-80.00
3	Fabio Mangilli	Guerriero de Capestrano	Italy	-85.00
4	Alfred Blaser	Mahmud	Switzerland	-93.00
5	Sigurd Svensson	Dust	Sweden	-103.00
6	Bernard Chevallier	Aiglonne	France	-104.00
7	Earl Foster Thomson	Reno Rhythm	United States	-105.00
8	Niels Mikkelsen	St. Hans	Denmark	-108.00
9	Robert Selfelt	Claque	Sweden	-109.00
9	Lyndon Bolton	Sylveste	Great Britain	-109.00
9	Pierre Musy	Französin	Switzerland	-109.00
12	José Manuel Sagasta	Mandinga	Argentina	-110.00
13	Charles Anderson	Reno Palisade	United States	-111.00
14	Erik Carlsen	Esja	Denmark	-113.00
14	René Emanuelli	Tourtourelle	France	-113.00
16	Aëcio Coelho	Guapo	Brazil	-114.00
16	Kai Aage Krarup	Rollo	Denmark	-114.00
18	Douglas Stewart	Dark Seal	Great Britain	-116.00
19	Frank Henry	Swing Low	United States	-117.00
20	Francisco Carrere	Rosarino	Argentina	-121.00
21	Eyüp Yiğittürk	Ozbek	Turkey	-122.00
22	Julio César Sagasta	Cherenda Cue	Argentina	-124.00
23	Mauno Roiha	Roa	Finland	-125.00
24	Joaquín Nogueras	Epsom	Spain	-128.00
24	Raúl Campero	Tarahumara	Mexico	-128.00
26	Ernest van Loon	Springsteel	Netherlands	-129.00
26	Raimondo D'Inzeo	Regate	Italy	-129.00
28	Humberto Mariles	Parral	Mexico	-134.00
29	Fernando Cavaleiro	Satari	Portugal	-135.00
30	António Serôdio	Abstrato	Portugal	-137.00
31	Adolf Ehrnrooth	Lilia	Finland	-141.00
32	Olof Stahre	Komet	Sweden	-143.00
33	Dick ten Cate	Unique de Genual	Netherlands	-144.00
33	Eugenio Montessoro	Tic Tac	Italy	-144.00
33	Heinrich Sauer	Sobri	Austria	-144.00
36	Joaquín Solano	Malinche	Mexico	-149.00
37	Fernando Gazapo	Vivian	Spain	-153.00
38	Arvo Haanpää	Upea	Finland	-162.00
39	Santiago Martínez	Fogoso	Spain	-163.00
40	Peter Borwick	Liberty	Great Britain	-167.00
41	Fernando Paes	Zuari	Portugal	-169.00
42	Ziya Azak	Ruzgar	Turkey	-172.00
43	Renyldo Ferreira	Indio	Brazil	-184.00
44	Anísio da Rocha	Carioca	Brazil	-185.00
45	Salih Koç	Cesur	Turkey	-197.00

=== Standings after cross-country ===
Rank	Rider	Horse	Nation	Dressage	Cross-country						Total
Rank	Rider	Horse	Nation	Dressage	Points lost			Points gained			Total
Rank	Rider	Horse	Nation	Dressage	Obstacles	Time	Total	Stage B	Stage D	Total	Total
1	Bernard Chevallier	Aiglonne	France	-104.00	0	0	0	36	72	108	4.00
2	Charles Anderson	Reno Palisade	United States	-111.00	0	0	0	36	60	96	-15.00
3	Frank Henry	Swing Low	United States	-117.00	0	0	0	36	60	96	-21.00
4	Robert Selfelt	Claque	Sweden	-109.00	0	0	0	24	60	84	-25.00
5	Niels Mikkelsen	St. Hans	Denmark	-108.00	0	0	0	24	54	78	-30.00
6	Fabio Mangilli	Guerriero de Capestrano	Italy	-85.00	20	0	20	33	39	72	-33.00
7	José Manuel Sagasta	Mandinga	Argentina	-110.00	0	0	0	30	42	72	-38.00
8	Alfred Blaser	Mahmud	Switzerland	-93.00	0	0	0	18	36	54	-39.00
9	Joaquín Nogueras	Epsom	Spain	-128.00	0	0	0	36	51	87	-41.00
10	Aëcio Coelho	Guapo	Brazil	-114.00	0	0	0	27	45	72	-42.00
11	Erik Carlsen	Esja	Denmark	-113.00	0	0	0	18	51	69	-44.00
12	Fernando Cavaleiro	Satari	Portugal	-135.00	0	0	0	33	57	90	-45.00
13	António Serôdio	Abstrato	Portugal	-137.00	0	0	0	30	57	87	-50.00
13	Olof Stahre	Komet	Sweden	-143.00	0	0	0	33	60	93	-50.00
15	Ernest van Loon	Springsteel	Netherlands	-129.00	0	0	0	18	60	78	-51.00
15	Kai Aage Krarup	Rollo	Denmark	-114.00	0	0	0	27	36	63	-51.00
17	Francisco Carrere	Rosarino	Argentina	-121.00	0	0	0	24	42	66	-55.00
18	Humberto Mariles	Parral	Mexico	-134.00	0	0	0	24	51	75	-59.00
19	Sigurd Svensson	Dust	Sweden	-103.00	0	0	0	21	12	33	-70.00
20	Peter Borwick	Liberty	Great Britain	-167.00	0	0	0	36	51	87	-80.00
21	Arvo Haanpää	Upea	Finland	-162.00	0	0	0	27	54	81	-81.00
22	Julio César Sagasta	Cherenda Cue	Argentina	-124.00	0	0	0	21	15	36	-88.00
23	Raúl Campero	Tarahumara	Mexico	-128.00	0	0	0	15	24	39	-89.00
24	Earl Foster Thomson	Reno Rhythm	United States	-105.00	60	0	60	30	42	72	-93.00
25	Tony Bühler	Amour Amour	Switzerland	-80.00	60	0	60	15	30	45	-95.00
25	Eugenio Montessoro	Tic Tac	Italy	-144.00	20	0	20	24	45	69	-95.00
27	Fernando Gazapo	Vivian	Spain	-153.00	20	0	20	27	48	75	-98.00
28	Adolf Ehrnrooth	Lilia	Finland	-141.00	20	0	20	24	27	51	-110.00
29	Joaquín Solano	Malinche	Mexico	-149.00	0	0	0	24	12	36	-113.00
30	Dick ten Cate	Unique de Genual	Netherlands	-144.00	40	0	0	33	36	69	-115.00
31	Salih Koç	Cesur	Turkey	-197.00	0	0	0	24	21	45	-152.00
32	Fernando Paes	Zuari	Portugal	-169.00	0	30	30	33	0	33	-166.00
33	Mauno Roiha	Roa	Finland	-125.00	80	0	80	18	9	27	-178.00
34	Lyndon Bolton	Sylveste	Great Britain	-109.00	120	0	120	30	18	48	-181.00
35	Santiago Martínez	Fogoso	Spain	-163.00	0	50	50	21	0	21	-192.00
36	Raimondo D'Inzeo	Regate	Italy	-129.00	0	70	70	6	0	6	-193.00
37	Renyldo Ferreira	Indio	Brazil	-184.00	80	0	80	18	36	54	-210.00
38	Anísio da Rocha	Carioca	Brazil	-185.00	80	0	80	21	15	36	-229.00
39	Pierre Musy	Französin	Switzerland	-109.00	60	80	140	9	0	9	-240.00
40	René Emanuelli	Tourtourelle	France	-113.00	240	0	240	24	27	51	-302.00
41	André Jousseaume	Gigolo	France	-78.00	180	80	260	27	0	27	-311.00
-	Eyüp Yiğittürk	Ozbek	Turkey	-122.00	Disqualified						DSQ
-	Douglas Stewart	Dark Seal	Great Britain	-116.00	Retired						DNF
-	Heinrich Sauer	Sobri	Austria	-144.00	Retired						DNF
-	Ziya Azak	Ruzgar	Turkey	-172.00	Retired						DNF

=== Final results after jumping ===
Rank	Rider	Horse	Nation	Dressage	Cross-country	Jumping			Total
Rank	Rider	Horse	Nation	Dressage	Cross-country	Points lost			Total
Rank	Rider	Horse	Nation	Dressage	Cross-country	Obstacles	Time	Total	Total
1st place, gold medalist(s)	Bernard Chevallier	Aiglonne	France	-104.00	108	0	0	0	4.00
2nd place, silver medalist(s)	Frank Henry	Swing Low	United States	-117.00	96	0	0	0	-21.00
3rd place, bronze medalist(s)	Robert Selfelt	Claque	Sweden	-109.00	84	0	0	0	-25.00
4	Charles Anderson	Reno Palisade	United States	-111.00	96	10	1.50	11.50	-26.50
5	Joaquín Nogueras	Epsom	Spain	-128.00	87	0	0	0	-41.00
6	Erik Carlsen	Esja	Denmark	-113.00	69	0	0	0	-44.00
7	Aëcio Coelho	Guapo	Brazil	-114.00	72	10	0	10	-52.00
8	Fernando Cavaleiro	Satari	Portugal	-135.00	90	10	0	0	-55.00
8	Fabio Mangilli	Guerriero de Capestrano	Italy	-85.00	52	20	2	22	-55.00
10	Francisco Carrere	Rosarino	Argentina	-121.00	66	0	4	4	-59.00
11	Alfred Blaser	Mahmud	Switzerland	-93.00	54	20	0.25	20.25	-59.25
12	Humberto Mariles	Parral	Mexico	-134.00	75	0	2.75	2.75	-61.75
13	Ernest van Loon	Springsteel	Netherlands	-129.00	78	10	1	11	-62.00
14	Kai Aage Krarup	Rollo	Denmark	-114.00	63	10	4	14	-65.00
15	Olof Stahre	Komet	Sweden	-143.00	93	20	0	20	-70.00
15	Sigurd Svensson	Dust	Sweden	-103.00	33	0	0	0	-70.00
17	Peter Borwick	Liberty	Great Britain	-167.00	87	0	0.25	0.25	-80.25
18	Julio César Sagasta	Cherenda Cue	Argentina	-124.00	36	0	4.50	4.50	-92.50
19	Tony Bühler	Amour Amour	Switzerland	-80.00	-15	0	0	0	-95.00
20	Adolf Ehrnrooth	Lilia	Finland	-141.00	-31	0	0	0	-110.00
21	Earl Foster Thomson	Reno Rhythm	United States	-105.00	12	20	1	21	-114.00
22	Raúl Campero	Tarahumara	Mexico	-128.00	39	30	1.50	31.50	-120.50
23	Joaquín Solano	Malinche	Mexico	-149.00	36	10	0	10	-123.00
24	Dick ten Cate	Unique de Genual	Netherlands	-144.00	29	30	0.50	30.50	-145.50
25	Fernando Paes	Zuari	Portugal	-169.00	3	0	1.50	1.50	-167.50
26	Fernando Gazapo	Vivian	Spain	-153.00	55	80	1.25	81.25	-179.25
27	Lyndon Bolton	Sylveste	Great Britain	-109.00	-72	0	1	1	-182.00
28	Mauno Roiha	Roa	Finland	-125.00	-53	20	4	24	-202.00
29	Santiago Martínez	Fogoso	Spain	-163.00	-29	10	0.25	10.25	-202.25
30	Raimondo D'Inzeo	Regate	Italy	-129.00	-64	30	0	30	-223.00
31	Renyldo Ferreira	Indio	Brazil	-184.00	-27	40	0	40	-250.00
32	Pierre Musy	Französin	Switzerland	-109.00	-131	10	0.25	10.25	-250.25
33	René Emanuelli	Tourtourelle	France	-113.00	-189	0	1.25	1.25	-303.25
-	Salih Koç	Cesur	Turkey	-197.00	45	Eliminated			
-	Niels Mikkelsen	St. Hans	Denmark	-108.00	78	Eliminated			
-	Anísio da Rocha	Carioca	Brazil	-185.00	-44	Eliminated			
-	António Serôdio	Abstrato	Portugal	-137.00	87	Eliminated			
-	Eugenio Montessoro	Tic Tac	Italy	-144.00	49	Eliminated			
-	José Manuel Sagasta	Mandinga	Argentina	-110.00	72	Eliminated			
-	André Jousseaume	Gigolo	France	-78.00	-233	Eliminated			
-	Arvo Haanpää	Upea	Finland	-162.00	81	Eliminated			
-	Eyüp Yiğittürk	Ozbek	Turkey	-122.00	Disqualified				DSQ
-	Douglas Stewart	Dark Seal	Great Britain	-116.00	Retired				DNF
-	Heinrich Sauer	Sobri	Austria	-144.00	Retired				DNF
-	Ziya Azak	Ruzgar	Turkey	-172.00	Retired				DNF

== Sources ==
- Organising Committee for the XIV Olympiad, The (1948). The Official Report of the Organising Committee for the XIV Olympiad (PDF). LA84 Foundation. p. 342. Archived from the original (PDF) on 27 September 2013.
