= Equestrian at the 1948 Summer Olympics – Team eventing =

Equestrian at the Olympics

Team eventing at the Games of the XIV Olympiad
- Venue: Aldershot (Dressage, Jumping); Tweseldown Racecourse (Cross-country)
- Date: 10–13 August 1948
- Competitors: 42 from 14 nations

Medalists
1st place, gold medalist(s)		Charles Anderson; Frank Henry; Earl Foster Thomson	United States
2nd place, silver medalist(s)		Robert Selfelt; Olof Stahre; Sigurd Svensson	Sweden
3rd place, bronze medalist(s)		Raúl Campero; Humberto Mariles; Joaquín Solano	Mexico

The team eventing in equestrian at the 1948 Olympic Games in London was held in the town of Aldershot and at the Tweseldown Racecourse from 10 to 13 August. The American team of Charles Anderson, Frank Henry and Earl Foster Thomson won the gold medal. Sweden won the silver medal and Mexico took bronze.

== Competition format ==
The team and individual eventing competitions used the same scores. Eventing consisted of a dressage test, a cross-country test, and a jumping test. Team eventing final scores were the sum of the three individual scores for riders from the same NOC.

== Results ==
=== Standings after dressage ===
Nation	Individual results			Team penalties	Team rank
Nation	Rider	Horse	Penalties	Team penalties	Team rank
Switzerland	Tony Bühler	Amour Amour	-80.00	-282.00	1
Switzerland	Alfred Blaser	Mahmud	-93.00	-282.00	1
Switzerland	Pierre Musy	Französin	-109.00	-282.00	1
France	André Josseaume	Gigolo	-78.00	-295.00	2
France	Bernard Chevallier	Aiglonne	-104.00	-295.00	2
France	René Emanuelli	Tourtourelle	-113.00	-295.00	2
United States	Earl Foster Thomson	Reno Rhythm	-105.00	-333.00	3
United States	Charles Anderson	Reno Palisade	-111.00	-333.00	3
United States	Frank Henry	Swing Low	-117.00	-333.00	3
Denmark	Niels Mikkelsen	St. Hans	-108.00	-335.00	4
Denmark	Erik Carlsen	Esja	-113.00	-335.00	4
Denmark	Kai Aage Krarup	Rollo	-114.00	-335.00	4
Argentina	José Manuel Sagasta	Mandinga	-110.00	-355.00	5
Argentina	Francisco Carrere	Rosarino	-121.00	-355.00	5
Argentina	Julio César Sagasta	Cherenda Cue	-124.00	-355.00	5
Sweden	Sigurd Svensson	Dust	-103.00	-355.00	5
Sweden	Robert Selfelt	Claque	-109.00	-355.00	5
Sweden	Olof Stahre	Komet	-143.00	-355.00	5
Italy	Fabio Mangilli	Guerriero de Capestrano	-85.00	-358.00	7
Italy	Raimondo D'Inzeo	Regate	-129.00	-358.00	7
Italy	Eugenio Montessoro	Tic Tac	-144.00	-358.00	7
Great Britain	Lyndon Bolton	Sylveste	-109.00	-392.00	8
Great Britain	Douglas Stewart	Dark Seal	-116.00	-392.00	8
Great Britain	Peter Borwick	Liberty	-167.00	-392.00	8
Mexico	Raúl Campero	Tarahumara	-128.00	-411.00	9
Mexico	Humberto Mariles	Parral	-134.00	-411.00	9
Mexico	Joaquín Solano	Malinche	-149.00	-411.00	9
Finland	Mauno Roiha	Roa	-125.00	-428.00	10
Finland	Adolf Ehrnrooth	Lilia	-141.00	-428.00	10
Finland	Arvo Haanpää	Upea	-162.00	-428.00	10
Portugal	Fernando Cavaleiro	Satari	-135.00	-441.00	11
Portugal	António Serôdio	Abstrato	-137.00	-441.00	11
Portugal	Fernando Paes	Zuari	-169.00	-441.00	11
Spain	Joaquín Nogueras	Epsom	-128.00	-444.00	12
Spain	Fernando Gazapo	Vivian	-153.00	-444.00	12
Spain	Santiago Martínez	Fogoso	-163.00	-444.00	12
Brazil	Aëcio Coelho	Guapo	-114.00	-483.00	13
Brazil	Renyldo Ferreira	Indio	-184.00	-483.00	13
Brazil	Anísio da Rocha	Carioca	-185.00	-483.00	13
Turkey	Eyüp Yiğittürk	Ozbek	-122.00	-491.00	14
Turkey	Ziya Azak	Ruzgar	-172.00	-491.00	14
Turkey	Salih Koç	Cesur	-197.00	-491.00	14

=== Standings after cross-country ===
Nation	Individual results					Total team penalties	Team rank
Nation	Rider	Horse	Cross-country Penalties	Cross-country Points gained	Total Penalties	Total team penalties	Team rank
Denmark	Niels Mikkelsen	St. Hans	0.00	78.00	-30.00	-125.00	1
Denmark	Erik Carlsen	Esja	0.00	69.00	-44.00	-125.00	1
Denmark	Kai Aage Krarup	Rollo	0.00	63.00	-51.00	-125.00	1
United States	Earl Foster Thomson	Reno Rhythm	-60.00	72.00	-93.00	-129.00	2
United States	Charles Anderson	Reno Palisade	0.00	96.00	-15.00	-129.00	2
United States	Frank Henry	Swing Low	0.00	96.00	-21.00	-129.00	2
Sweden	Sigurd Svensson	Dust	0.00	33.00	-70.00	-145.00	3
Sweden	Robert Selfelt	Claque	0.00	84.00	-25.00	-145.00	3
Sweden	Olof Stahre	Komet	0.00	93.00	-50.00	-145.00	3
Argentina	José Manuel Sagasta	Mandinga	0.00	72.00	-38.00	-181.00	4
Argentina	Francisco Carrere	Rosarino	0.00	66.00	-55.00	-181.00	4
Argentina	Julio César Sagasta	Cherenda Cue	0.00	36.00	-88.00	-181.00	4
Mexico	Raúl Campero	Tarahumara	0.00	39.00	-89.00	-261.00	5
Mexico	Humberto Mariles	Parral	0.00	75.00	-59.00	-261.00	5
Mexico	Joaquín Solano	Malinche	0.00	36.00	-113.00	-261.00	5
Portugal	Fernando Cavaleiro	Satari	0.00	90.00	-45.00	-261.00	5
Portugal	António Serôdio	Abstrato	0.00	87.00	-50.00	-261.00	5
Portugal	Fernando Paes	Zuari	-30.00	33.00	-166.00	-261.00	5
Italy	Fabio Mangilli	Guerriero de Capestrano	-20.00	72.00	-33.00	-321.00	7
Italy	Raimondo D'Inzeo	Regate	-70.00	6.00	-193.00	-321.00	7
Italy	Eugenio Montessoro	Tic Tac	-20.00	69.00	-95.00	-321.00	7
Spain	Joaquín Nogueras	Epsom	0.00	78.00	-41.00	-331.00	8
Spain	Fernando Gazapo	Vivian	-20.00	75.00	-98.00	-331.00	8
Spain	Santiago Martínez	Fogoso	-50.00	21.00	-192.00	-331.00	8
Finland	Mauno Roiha	Roa	-80.00	27.00	-178.00	-369.00	9
Finland	Adolf Ehrnrooth	Lilia	-20.00	51.00	-110.00	-369.00	9
Finland	Arvo Haanpää	Upea	0.00	81.00	-81.00	-369.00	9
Switzerland	Tony Bühler	Amour Amour	-60.00	45.00	-95.00	-374.00	10
Switzerland	Alfred Blaser	Mahmud	0.00	54.00	-39.00	-374.00	10
Switzerland	Pierre Musy	Französin	-140.00	9.00	-240.00	-374.00	10
Brazil	Aëcio Coelho	Guapo	0.00	72.00	-42.00	-481.00	11
Brazil	Renyldo Ferreira	Indio	-80.00	54.00	-210.00	-481.00	11
Brazil	Anísio da Rocha	Carioca	-80.00	36.00	-229.00	-481.00	11
France	André Josseaume	Gigolo	-260.00	27.00	-311.00	-609.00	12
France	Bernard Chevallier	Aiglonne	0.00	108.00	4.00	-609.00	12
France	René Emanuelli	Tourtourelle	-240.00	51.00	-302.00	-609.00	12
Turkey	Eyüp Yiğittürk	Ozbek	Disqualified			Eliminated	
Turkey	Ziya Azak	Ruzgar	Withdrew			Eliminated	
Turkey	Salih Koç	Cesur	0.00	45.00	-152.00	Eliminated	
Great Britain	Lyndon Bolton	Sylveste	-120.00	48.00	-181.00	Eliminated	
Great Britain	Douglas Stewart	Dark Seal	Withdrew			Eliminated	
Great Britain	Peter Borwick	Liberty	0.00	87.00	-80.00	Eliminated	

=== Final standings after jumping ===
Nation	Individual results				Total team penalties	Team rank
Nation	Rider	Horse	Jumping Penalties	Total Penalties	Total team penalties	Team rank
United States	Earl Foster Thomson	Reno Rhythm	-21.00	-114.00	-161.50	1st place, gold medalist(s)
United States	Charles Anderson	Reno Palisade	-11.50	-26.50	-161.50	1st place, gold medalist(s)
United States	Frank Henry	Swing Low	0.00	-21.00	-161.50	1st place, gold medalist(s)
Sweden	Sigurd Svensson	Dust	0.00	-70.00	-165.00	2nd place, silver medalist(s)
Sweden	Robert Selfelt	Claque	0.00	-25.00	-165.00	2nd place, silver medalist(s)
Sweden	Olof Stahre	Komet	-20.00	-70.00	-165.00	2nd place, silver medalist(s)
Mexico	Raúl Campero	Tarahumara	-31.50	-120.50	-305.25	3rd place, bronze medalist(s)
Mexico	Humberto Mariles	Parral	-2.75	-61.75	-305.25	3rd place, bronze medalist(s)
Mexico	Joaquín Solano	Malinche	-10.00	-123.00	-305.25	3rd place, bronze medalist(s)
Switzerland	Tony Bühler	Amour Amour	0.00	-95.00	-404.50	4
Switzerland	Alfred Blaser	Mahmud	-20.25	-59.25	-404.50	4
Switzerland	Pierre Musy	Französin	-10.25	-250.25	-404.50	4
Spain	Joaquín Nogueras	Epsom	0.00	-41.00	-422.50	5
Spain	Fernando Gazapo	Vivian	-81.25	-179.25	-422.50	5
Spain	Santiago Martínez	Fogoso	-10.25	-202.25	-422.50	5
Denmark	Niels Mikkelsen	St. Hans	Eliminated		Eliminated	
Denmark	Erik Carlsen	Esja	0.00	-44.00	Eliminated	
Denmark	Kai Aage Krarup	Rollo	-14.00	-65.00	Eliminated	
Argentina	José Manuel Sagasta	Mandinga	Eliminated		Eliminated	
Argentina	Francisco Carrere	Rosarino	-4.00	-59.00	Eliminated	
Argentina	Julio César Sagasta	Cherenda Cue	-4.50	-92.50	Eliminated	
Portugal	Fernando Cavaleiro	Satari	-10.00	-55.00	Eliminated	
Portugal	António Serôdio	Abstrato	Eliminated		Eliminated	
Portugal	Fernando Paes	Zuari	-1.50	-167.50	Eliminated	
Great Britain	Lyndon Bolton	Sylveste	-1.00	-182.00	Eliminated	
Great Britain	Douglas Stewart	Dark Seal	Withdrew		Eliminated	
Great Britain	Peter Borwick	Liberty	-0.25	-80.25	Eliminated	
Italy	Fabio Mangilli	Guerriero de Capestrano	-22.00	-55.00	Eliminated	
Italy	Raimondo D'Inzeo	Regate	-30.00	-223.00	Eliminated	
Italy	Eugenio Montessoro	Tic Tac	Withdrew		Eliminated	
France	André Josseaume	Gigolo	Withdrew		Eliminated	
France	Bernard Chevallier	Aiglonne	0.00	4.00	Eliminated	
France	René Emanuelli	Tourtourelle	-1.25	-303.25	Eliminated	
Brazil	Aëcio Coelho	Guapo	-10.00	-52.00	Eliminated	
Brazil	Renyldo Ferreira	Indio	-40.00	-250.00	Eliminated	
Brazil	Anísio da Rocha	Carioca	Eliminated		Eliminated	
Finland	Mauno Roiha	Roa	-24.00	-202.00	Eliminated	
Finland	Adolf Ehrnrooth	Lilia	0.00	-110.00	Eliminated	
Finland	Arvo Haanpää	Upea	Eliminated		Eliminated	
Turkey	Eyüp Yiğittürk	Ozbek	Disqualified		Eliminated	
Turkey	Ziya Azak	Ruzgar	Withdrew		Eliminated	
Turkey	Salih Koç	Cesur	Eliminated		Eliminated	

== Sources ==
- Organising Committee for the XIV Olympiad, The (1948). The Official Report of the Organising Committee for the XIV Olympiad, p. 342. LA84 Foundation. Retrieved 4 September 2016.
