= Equestrian at the 1936 Summer Olympics – Individual dressage =

Equestrian event at the 1936 Summer Olympics

Individual dressage at the Games of the XI Olympiad
- Venue: May Field
- Date: 12–13 August 1936
- Competitors: 29 from 11 nations

Medalists
| 1st place, gold medalist(s) | | Heinz Pollay | Germany |
| 2nd place, silver medalist(s) | | Friedrich Gerhard | Germany |
| 3rd place, bronze medalist(s) | | Alois Podhajsky | Austria |

The individual dressage event in equestrian at the 1936 Summer Olympics was held at the May Field in Berlin, Germany, from 12 to 13 August. A total of 29 riders from 11 nations competed in the event.

German riders dominated the competition, securing the top two spots. Heinz Pollay won the gold medal, while his compatriot Friedrich Gerhard claimed silver. The bronze medal went to Alois Podhajsky of Austria.

== Competition format ==
The team and individual dressage competitions at the 1936 Summer Olympics used the same results. Riders were required to perform a test from memory within a 17-minute time limit, with a penalty of half a point for every second over the limit. The test consisted of 40 individual movements. Each movement was scored by the judges on a scale from 0 to 10, with the score multiplied by the movement's coefficient to determine the total for that movement.

For the individual event, a point-for-place system was used. Under this system, each judge ranked the pairs based on their scores, awarding 1 point to the top-scoring pair, 2 points to the second, and so on. The total number of points across the five judges was calculated for each pair, and the pair with the lowest total points was declared the winner.

In contrast, the team event relied on raw scores rather than the point-for-place system.

The panel of judges for the competition included:

- Col. Baron Cl. v. Cederström (Sweden)
- Gen. A. Decarpentry (France)
- Lt. Col. Baron A. v. Henikstein (Austria)
- Gen. v. Poseck (Germany)
- Col. Qu. v. Ufford (Netherlands)

== Results ==
| Rank | Rider | Nation | Horse | Score | | | | | | Points | | | | | |
| Rank | Rider | Nation | Horse | SWE | FRA | AUT | GER | NED | Total | SWE | FRA | AUT | GER | NED | Total |
|---|---|---|---|---|---|---|---|---|---|---|---|---|---|---|---|
| 1st place, gold medalist(s) | Heinz Pollay | Germany | Kronos | 341.5 | 356.5 | 343.5 | 377.5 | 341.0 | 1760.0 | 4 | 1 | 4 | 1 | 5 | 15 |
| 2nd place, silver medalist(s) | Friedrich Gerhard | Germany | Absinth | 346.0 | 333.5 | 345.0 | 376.5 | 344.5 | 1745.5 | 3 | 7 | 3 | 2 | 3 | 18 |
| 3rd place, bronze medalist(s) | Alois Podhajsky | Austria | Nero | 339.5 | 343.5 | 372.0 | 314.5 | 352.0 | 1721.5 | 5 | 4 | 1 | 7 | 2 | 19 |
| 4 | Gregor Adlercreutz | Sweden | Teresina | 372.0 | 334.5 | 351.5 | 307.0 | 310.0 | 1675.0 | 1 | 6 | 2 | 8 | 9 | 26 |
| 5 | André Jousseaume | France | Favorite | 309.0 | 339.5 | 315.0 | 325.5 | 353.5 | 1642.5 | 8 | 5 | 8 | 4 | 1 | 26 |
| 6 | Gérard de Balorre | France | Becaucheur | 309.0 | 353.5 | 340.5 | 316.0 | 315.0 | 1634.0 | 8 | 2 | 5 | 6 | 8 | 29 |
| 7 | Peder Jensen | Denmark | His ex | 327.5 | 326.0 | 322.5 | 288.5 | 331.5 | 1596.0 | 7 | 8 | 7 | 11 | 6 | 39 |
| 8 | Pierre Versteegh | Netherlands | Ad Astra | 296.5 | 321.5 | 314.0 | 305.5 | 341.5 | 1579.0 | 13 | 9 | 9 | 9 | 4 | 44 |
| 8 | Daniel Gillois | France | Nicolas | 306.5 | 352.5 | 290.0 | 321.0 | 399.5 | 1569.5 | 10 | 3 | 13 | 5 | 13 | 44 |
| 10 | Hermann von Oppeln-Bronikowski | Germany | Gimpel | 294.5 | 291.5 | 326.5 | 348.5 | 307.5 | 1568.5 | 14 | 15 | 6 | 3 | 11 | 49 |
| 11 | Sven Colliander | Sweden | Kal xx | 337.5 | 316.5 | 303.0 | 285.5 | 288.0 | 1530.5 | 6 | 10 | 11 | 15 | 16 | 58 |
| 12 | Albert Dolleschall | Austria | Infant | 284.5 | 308.0 | 314.0 | 286.0 | 283.5 | 1476.0 | 16 | 12 | 9 | 14 | 17 | 68 |
| 13 | František Jandl | Czechoslovakia | Nestor | 270.5 | 314.0 | 285.5 | 286.5 | 296.5 | 1453.0 | 20 | 11 | 15 | 13 | 14 | 73 |
| 14 | Gusztáv von Pados | Hungary | Ficsur | 277.0 | 293.0 | 289.0 | 288.0 | 277.0 | 1424.0 | 18 | 14 | 14 | 12 | 18 | 76 |
| 15 | Folke Sandström | Sweden | Pergola | 348.0 | 275.5 | 277.0 | 284.0 | 270.5 | 1455.0 | 2 | 21 | 20 | 16 | 21 | 80 |
| 15 | Arthur von Pongracz | Austria | Georgine | 273.0 | 289.5 | 303.0 | 268.5 | 296.0 | 1430.0 | 19 | 17 | 11 | 18 | 15 | 80 |
| 17 | Arthur Qvist | Norway | Jaspis | 299.5 | 270.5 | 284.0 | 279.5 | 304.5 | 1438.0 | 12 | 23 | 17 | 17 | 12 | 81 |
| 17 | László von Magasházy | Hungary | Tücsök | 284.0 | 289.5 | 277.5 | 291.0 | 273.5 | 1415.5 | 17 | 17 | 18 | 10 | 19 | 81 |
| 19 | Gerard le Heux | Netherlands | Zonnetje | 288.5 | 286.5 | 270.0 | 268.0 | 309.0 | 1422.0 | 15 | 19 | 21 | 19 | 10 | 84 |
| 20 | Eugen Johansen | Norway | Sorte Mand | 302.0 | 290.0 | 267.5 | 257.0 | 271.5 | 1388.0 | 11 | 16 | 22 | 22 | 20 | 91 |
| 21 | Daniël Camerling Helmolt | Netherlands | Wodan | 258.5 | 268.0 | 277.5 | 253.5 | 323.5 | 1381.0 | 25 | 24 | 18 | 26 | 7 | 100 |
| 22 | Hans Moser | Switzerland | Revue | 265.0 | 293.5 | 285.5 | 255.0 | 238.0 | 1337.0 | 22 | 13 | 15 | 24 | 29 | 103 |
| 23 | Stanton Babcock | United States | Olympic | 265.0 | 275.0 | 263.0 | 268.0 | 259.5 | 1330.5 | 22 | 22 | 23 | 19 | 23 | 109 |
| 24 | Matej Pechman | Czechoslovakia | Ideal | 265.5 | 284.0 | 260.5 | 262.5 | 246.5 | 1319.0 | 21 | 20 | 24 | 21 | 28 | 114 |
| 25 | Isaac Kitts | United States | American Lady | 246.0 | 265.5 | 246.0 | 256.5 | 251.0 | 1265.0 | 28 | 25 | 27 | 23 | 25 | 128 |
| 26 | Pál Kémery | Hungary | Csintalan | 260.0 | 237.0 | 247.5 | 240.5 | 265.5 | 1250.5 | 24 | 28 | 26 | 29 | 22 | 129 |
| 27 | Hiram Tuttle | United States | Si Murray | 265.5 | 226.0 | 239.0 | 254.5 | 259.0 | 1233.0 | 26 | 29 | 29 | 25 | 24 | 133 |
| 28 | Bjørn Bjørnseth | Norway | Invictus | 227.5 | 247.0 | 251.0 | 252.5 | 246.5 | 1224.5 | 29 | 27 | 25 | 27 | 26 | 134 |
| 29 | Otto Schöniger | Czechoslovakia | Helios | 246.5 | 265.0 | 242.0 | 251.0 | 249.5 | 1254.0 | 27 | 26 | 28 | 28 | 26 | 135 |
