= Equestrian at the 1936 Summer Olympics – Team dressage =

Equestrian at the Olympics

Team dressage at the Games of the XI Olympiad
- Venue: May Field
- Date: 12–13 August 1936
- Competitors: 27 (9 teams) from 9 nations

Medalists
1st place, gold medalist(s)		Heinz Pollay; Friedrich Gerhard; Hermann von Oppeln-Bronikowski	Germany
2nd place, silver medalist(s)		André Jousseaume; Gérard de Ballorre; Daniel Gillois	France
3rd place, bronze medalist(s)		Gregor Adlercreutz; Sven Colliander; Folke Sandström	Sweden

The team dressage in equestrian at the 1936 Olympic Games in Berlin was held on the May Field on 12–13 August. The host German team won the gold medal. France won silver and Sweden took bronze.

== Competition format ==
The team and individual dressage competitions used the same format: a series of moves was performed from memory by each rider within 17 minutes, losing half a point for every second over the time limit. There were 40 individual movements in each test. For each movement, each judge gave a score from 0 to 10; this score was multiplied by the movement's coefficient.

== Results ==
Rank	Nation	Rider	Horse	Individual Score	Team Score
1st place, gold medalist(s)	Germany	Heinz Pollay; Friedrich Gerhard; Hermann von Oppeln-Bronikowski	Kronos; Absinth; Gimpel	1760.0; 1745.5; 1568.5	5074.0
2nd place, silver medalist(s)	France	André Jousseaume; Gérard de Balorre; Daniel Gillois	Favorite; Becaucheur; Nicolas	1642.5; 1634.0; 1569.5	4846.0
3rd place, bronze medalist(s)	Sweden	Gregor Adlercreutz; Sven Colliander; Folke Sandström	Teresina; Kal xx Pergola	1675.0; 1530.5; 1455.0	4660.5
4	Austria	Alois Podhajsky; Albert Dolleschall; Arthur von Pongracz	Nero; Infant; Georgine	1721.5; 1476.0; 1430.0	4627.5
5	Netherlands	Pierre Versteegh; Gerard le Heux; Daniel Camerling Helmolt	Ad Astra; Zonnetje; Wodan	1579.0; 1422.0; 1381.0	4382.0
6	Hungary	Gusztav von Pados; Laszlo von Magasházy; Pál Kémery	Ficsur; Tücsök; Csintalan	1424.0; 1415.5; 1250.5	4090.0
7	Norway	Arthur Qvist; Eugen Johansen; Bjørn Bjørnseth	Jaspis; Sorte Mand; Invictus	1438.0; 1388.0; 1224.5	4050.5
8	Czechoslovakia	František Jandl; Matej Pechman; Otto Schöniger	Nestor; Ideal; Helios	1453.0; 1319.0; 1254.0	4026.0
9	United States	Stanton Babcock; Isaac Kitts; Hiram Tuttle	Olympic; American Lady; Si Murray	1330.5; 1265.0; 1233.0	3828.5
