= 1948 Summer Olympics medal table =

1948 Summer Olympics medals
- Location: London, Great Britain

Highlights
- Most gold medals: United States (38)
- Most total medals: United States (84)
- Medalling NOCs: 37

World map showing the medal achievements of each country during the 1948 Summer Olympics Legend: represents countries that won at least one gold medal. represents countries that won at least one silver medal but no gold medals. represents countries that won at least one bronze medal (no gold or silver). represents participating countries that did not win medals. represents entities that did not participate at the 1948 Summer Olympics.

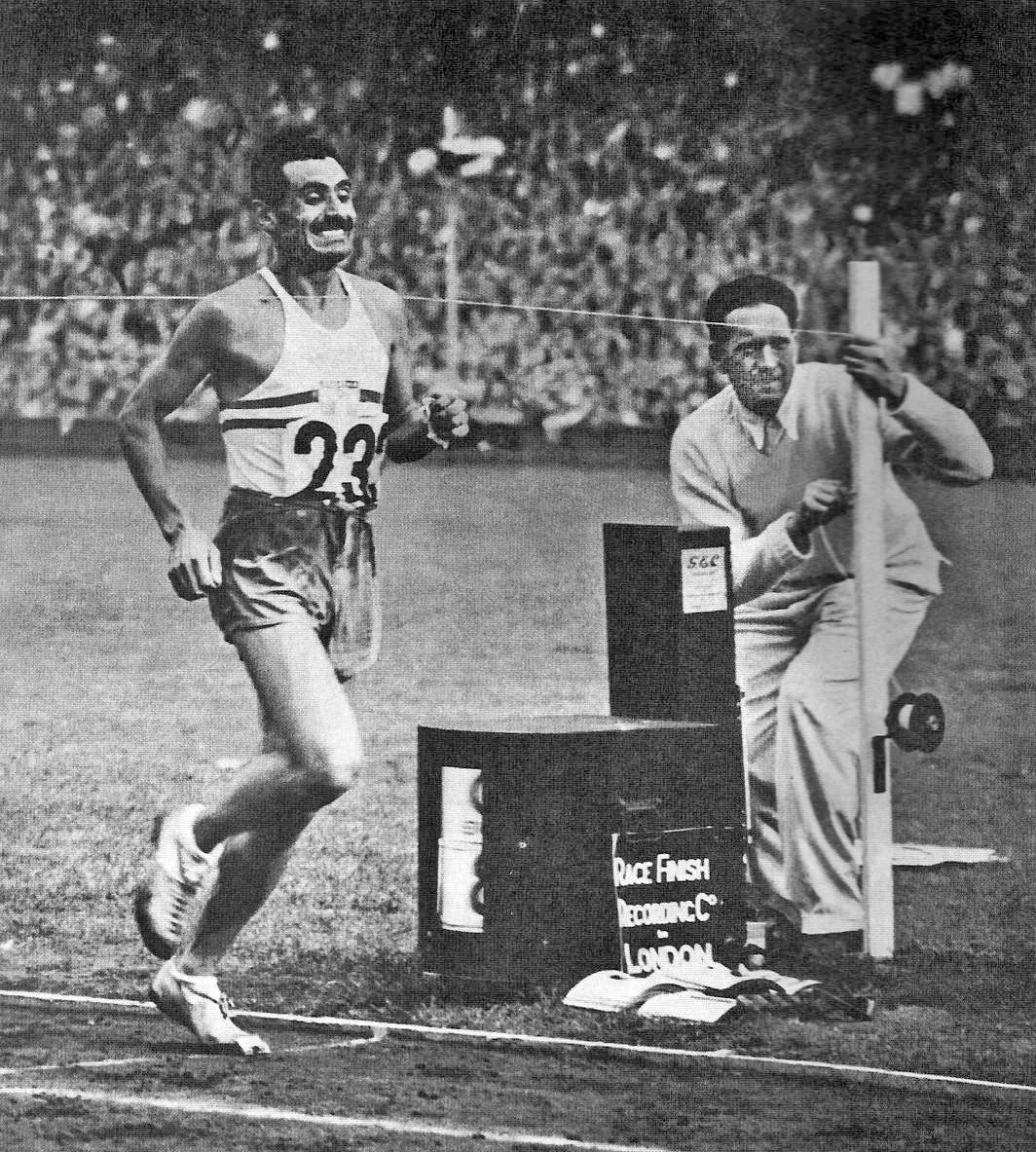
Delfo Cabrera of Argentina winning the marathon at the 1948 Olympics

The 1948 Summer Olympics (also known as the Games of the XIV Olympiad) was an international multi-sport event held from July 29 through August 14, 1948, in London, United Kingdom. It was the first Olympic Games to take place in twelve years, due to the Second World War (and was known informally as "The Austerity Games" – largely due to countries having to bring their own food due to shortages in Britain), with London being chosen as the host city in May 1946.

London had previously hosted the 1908 Summer Olympics, and was due to have hosted the event in 1944. A record 59 nations were represented by 4,104 athletes, 3,714 men and 385 women, in 19 sport disciplines. Following the Second World War, Germany and Japan remained under military occupation and had not yet formed their National Olympic Committee, and so were not invited. The only major Axis power to take part in the Games was Italy. The Soviet Union was invited to compete, but chose not to send any athletes, sending observers instead to prepare for the 1952 Summer Olympics. Following the threats of a boycott from Arab countries should an Israeli team fly their flag at the opening ceremony, the International Olympic Committee (IOC) excluded Israel from the Games on a technicality.

Several countries participated for the first time, including Burma, Ceylon, Lebanon, Puerto Rico and Syria. The Olympic medals themselves were the standard Trionfo design used for the Olympic medals between 1928 and 1968.

It was not until 2010 that Belgian Eugène Van Roosbroeck received his gold medal for his part in the cycling road race as there was no podium for winners following the race and the team returned to Belgium two days after the event having received no medals.

== Medal table ==
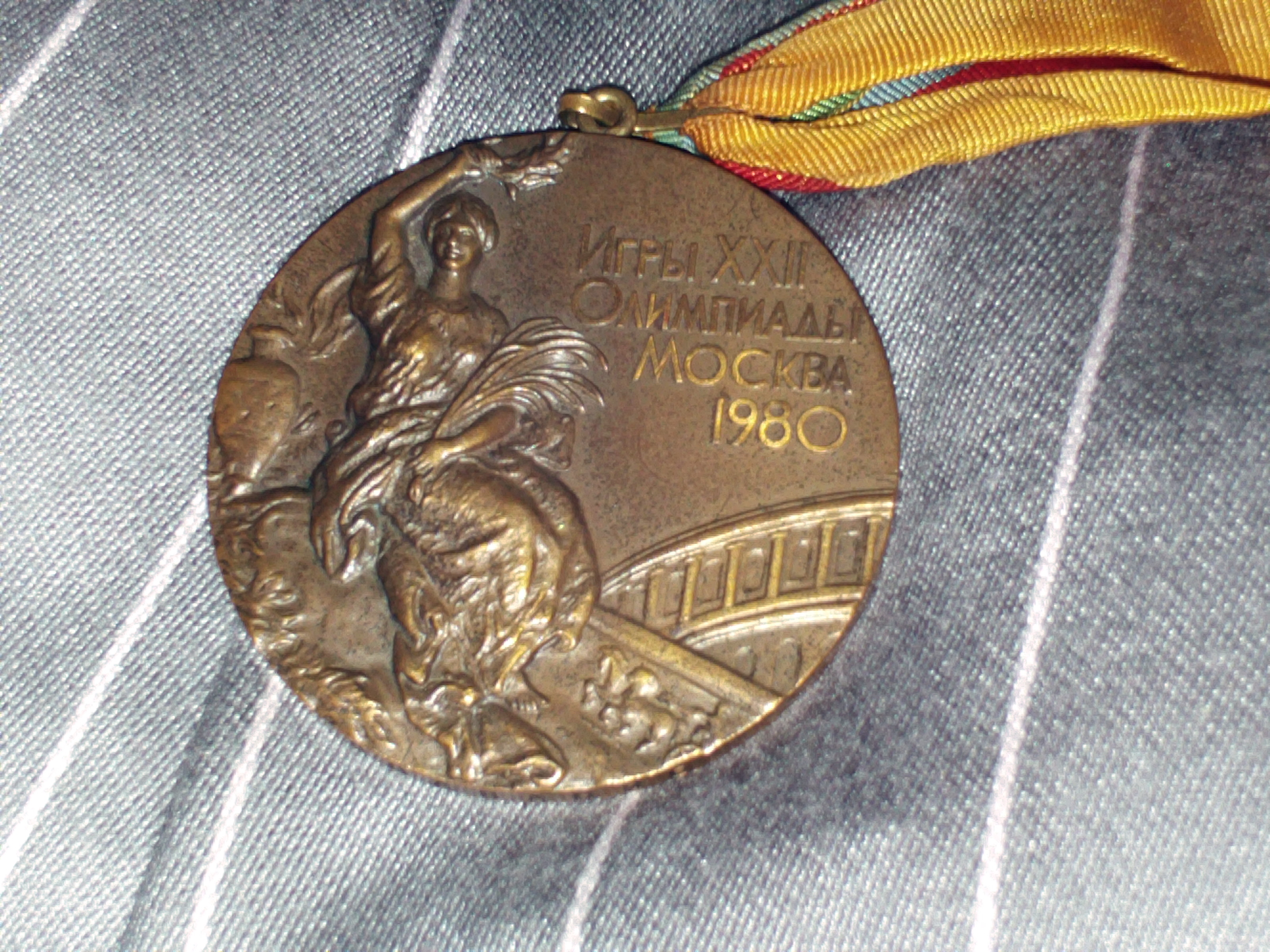
A bronze medal from the 1980 Summer Olympics featuring a similar design on the obverse to that of the 1948 medals

This is the full table of the medal count of the 1948 Summer Olympics, based on the medal count of the IOC. These rankings sort by the number of gold medals earned by a nation. The number of silver medals is taken into consideration next and then the number of bronze medals. If, after the above, countries are still tied, equal ranking is given and they are listed alphabetically. This information is provided by the IOC. However, the IOC does not recognize or endorse any ranking system.

In the gymnastics events there were three athletes placed first for the men's pommel horse, with Paavo Aaltonen, Veikko Huhtanen and Heikki Savolainen all receiving gold medals for Finland in the same event, while no silver or bronze medals were handed out. Meanwhile, in the men's vault, three athletes finished in joint third place and so were awarded a bronze medal each, resulting in five medals being handed out for that one event.

Mexico and Peru won their first gold medals, and India won its first medal as an independent nation.

- Medal table does include art competition medals

* Host nation (Great Britain)

1948 Summer Olympics medal table
Rank	Nation	Gold	Silver	Bronze	Total
1	United States	38	27	19	84
2	Sweden	17	11	18	46
3	France	11	6	15	32
4	Finland	10	8	6	24
5	Hungary	10	5	13	28
6	Italy	9	12	10	31
7	Turkey	6	4	2	12
8	Czechoslovakia	6	2	3	11
9	Switzerland	5	12	6	23
10	Denmark	5	8	9	22
11	Netherlands	5	2	9	16
12	Great Britain*	4	16	7	27
13	Argentina	3	3	1	7
14	Australia	2	6	5	13
15	Belgium	2	2	3	7
16	South Africa	2	2	2	6
17	Egypt	2	2	1	5
18	Mexico	2	1	2	5
19	Norway	1	3	3	7
20	Jamaica	1	2	0	3
21	Austria	1	0	3	4
22	Poland	1	0	1	2
23	India	1	0	0	1
23	Peru	1	0	0	1
25	Canada	0	2	2	4
26	Yugoslavia	0	2	0	2
27	Portugal	0	1	1	2
27	Uruguay	0	1	1	2
29	Ceylon	0	1	0	1
29	Cuba	0	1	0	1
29	Spain	0	1	0	1
29	Trinidad and Tobago	0	1	0	1
33	Panama	0	0	2	2
33	South Korea	0	0	2	2
35	Brazil	0	0	1	1
35	Iran	0	0	1	1
35	Ireland	0	0	1	1
35	Puerto Rico	0	0	1	1
Totals (38 entries)		145	144	150	439

== Changes in medal standings ==
Key

※ Disqualified athlete(s)

List of official changes in medal standings
Ruling date	Sport/Event	Athlete (NOC)	1st place, gold medalist(s)	2nd place, silver medalist(s)	3rd place, bronze medalist(s)	Total	Notes
27 April 1949	Equestrian; Team dressage	Sweden Gustaf Adolf Boltenstern, Jr. Henri Saint Cyr; Gehnäll Persson ※	−1			–1	The Swedish dressage team, which had originally won gold at the 1948 Games, was subsequently disqualified on April 27, 1949, by the Fédération Équestre Internationale (FEI) and with the approval of the IOC. Gehnäll Persson had been promoted to lieutenant three weeks before the competition. Just two and a half weeks after the competition, the Swedish army demoted him back to sergeant. According to the regulations at the time, only officers and “gentlemen riders” were eligible to take part, but not non-commissioned officers. Since Persson had only been promoted for the period surrounding the games, this was considered a violation of the rules. The incident led to the FEI modernizing its entry conditions, which were perceived as outdated.
27 April 1949	Equestrian; Team dressage	France André Jousseaume; Jean Saint-Fort Paillard; Maurice Buret	+1	−1		0	
27 April 1949	Equestrian; Team dressage	United States Robert Borg; Earl Foster Thomson; Frank Henry		+1	−1	0	
27 April 1949	Equestrian; Team dressage	Portugal Fernando Paes; Francisco Valadas; Luís Mena e Silva			+1	+1	

List of official changes by country
NOC	Gold	Silver	Bronze	Net Change
Sweden	−1	0	0	−1
France	+1	−1	0	0
United States	0	+1	−1	0
Portugal	0	0	+1	+1
