= Equestrian at the 1948 Summer Olympics – Team dressage =

Equestrian at the Olympics

Team dressage at the Games of the XIV Olympiad
- Venue: Aldershot
- Date: 9 August 1948
- Competitors: 15 (5 teams) from 5 nations

Medalists
1st place, gold medalist(s)		André Jousseaume; Jean Saint-Fort Paillard; Maurice Buret	France
2nd place, silver medalist(s)		Robert Borg; Earl Foster Thomson; Frank Henry	United States
3rd place, bronze medalist(s)		Fernando Paes; Francisco Valadas; Luís Mena e Silva	Portugal

The team dressage in equestrian at the 1948 Olympic Games in London was held in the town of Aldershot on 9 August. The French team consisting of André Jousseaume, Jean Saint-Fort Paillard and Maurice Buret won the gold medal. The United States won silver and Portugal took bronze.

The Swedish dressage team, which had originally won gold at the 1948 Games, was subsequently disqualified on April 27, 1949 by the Fédération Équestre Internationale (FEI) and with the approval of the IOC. Gehnäll Persson had been promoted to lieutenant three weeks before the competition. Just two and a half weeks after the competition, the Swedish army demoted him back to sergeant. According to the regulations at the time, only officers and “gentlemen riders” were eligible to take part, but not non-commissioned officers. Since Persson had only been promoted for the period surrounding the games, this was considered a violation of the rules. The incident led to the FEI modernizing its entry conditions, which were perceived as outdated.

== Competition format ==
The team and individual dressage competitions used the same results. A test was to be carried out from memory by each rider within 13 minutes, losing half a point for every second over the time limit.

== Results ==
Rank	Name	Horse	Individual Score	Team Score
1st place, gold medalist(s)	France; André Jousseaume; Jean Saint-Fort Paillard; Maurice Buret	Harpagon; Sous les Ceps; Saint Ouen	480.0; 439.5; 349.5	1269
2nd place, silver medalist(s)	United States; Robert Borg; Earl Foster Thomson; Frank Henry	Klingsor; Pancraft; Reno Overdo	473.5; 421.0; 361.5	1256
3rd place, bronze medalist(s)	Portugal; Fernando Paes; Francisco Valadas; Luís Mena e Silva	Matamas; Feitico; Fascinante	411.0; 405.0; 366.0	1182
4	Argentina; Justo Iturralde; Humberto Terzano; Oscar Goulú	Pajarito; Bienvenido; Grillo	397.0; 327.0; 281.5	1005.5
DSQ	Sweden; Gustaf Adolf Boltenstern, Jr. Henri Saint Cyr; Gehnäll Persson	Trumf; Djinn; Knaust	477.5; 444.5; DSQ	DSQ
