= Sagasta =

Sagasta is a surname. Notable people with the surname include:

- José Manuel Sagasta (fl. 1912–1948), Argentine equestrian
- Josefina Pelliza de Sagasta (1848–1888), Argentine poet, journalist, and writer
- Julio César Sagasta (fl. 1914–1952), Argentine equestrian
- Práxedes Mateo Sagasta (1825–1903), Spanish politician

== See also ==
- Sagastad, museum in Norway
