= Krarup =

Krarup is a Danish surname. In 2004 it was Denmark's 332nd most common surname. Notable people with the surname include:

- Carl Emil Krarup (1872–1909), Danish telegraph engineer
- Kai Aage Krarup (1915–2013), Danish equestrian
- Ole Krarup (1935–2017), Danish politician
- Søren Krarup (born 1937), Danish pastor
- Theodora Krarup (1862–1941), Danish painter
- Lennart Krarup (born 1972), Danish musician
