= Stahre =

Stahre is a Swedish surname. Notable people with the surname include:

- Mikael Stahre (born 1975), Swedish football manager
- Olof Stahre (1909–1988), Swedish equestrian
