= Santiago Martinez =

Santiago Martínez may refer to:

- Santiago Martínez (equestrian) (born 1912), Spanish Olympic equestrian
- Santiago Martínez Delgado (1906–1954), Colombian painter, sculptor, art historian and writer
- Santiago Martínez (weightlifter) (born 1979), Spanish male weightlifter
- Santiago Martínez (footballer, born 1991), Uruguayan footballer
- Santiago Martinez (footballer, born 1995), Paraguayan footballer
- Santiago Martínez (footballer, born 1998), Colombian footballer
