= Jandl =

Jandl (feminine" Jandlová) is a Czech surname. Notable people with the surname include:

- Ernst Jandl (1925–2000), Austrian writer, poet, and translator
- František Jandl (1905–1984), Czech equestrian
- Ivan Jandl (1937–1987), Czechoslovak child actor

== See also ==
- 37736 Jandl, main-belt asteroid
