= Jousseaume =

Jousseaume is a surname. Notable people with the surname include:

- André Jousseaume (1894–1960), French equestrian and Olympic champion
- Félix Pierre Jousseaume (1835–1921), French zoologist and malacologist
