= Ziya Azak =

Turkish equestrian (born 1918)

Personal information
- Nationality: Turkish
- Born: 1918
- Died: before 2013

Sport
- Sport: Equestrian

Ziya Azak (1918 – before 2013) was a Turkish equestrian. Azak was born in 1918. He won the 1948 Grand Prix in Rotterdam on Rizgar. He competed in the individual and team eventing competitions, at the 1948 Summer Olympics in London, where he did not finish. Azak died prior to 2013.
