= Dick ten Cate =

Dutch equestrian

Personal information
- Nationality: Dutch
- Discipline: Eventing
- Born: 24 March 1914; Purmerend, Netherlands
- Died: 13 December 1969 (aged 55); Meppel, Netherlands

Dick ten Cate (24 March 1914 – 13 December 1969) was a Dutch equestrian. He competed in the individual eventing at the 1948 Summer Olympics.
