= Narva March =

Swedish/Finnish/Estonian military march

The Narva March (Swedish: Narvamarschen; Finnish: Narvan marssi; Estonian: Narva marss) or the March of Narva is a Swedish military march. It is now often used as a funeral march, especially at Finnish or Estonian state or military funerals.

The march, named after the 1700 battle of Narva, can be traced back in written sources to 1797, when it appeared in a Swedish piano book as Marsch nyttjad då Carl XII:e nalkades Narva ("The March used as Charles XII approached Narva"). Its ultimate origin is unknown, although some have speculated on an ultimate Scottish or Irish origin. In 1818, on the centennial of Charles XII's death, the Swedish poet Erik Gustaf Geijer wrote a poem to commemorate the event. His words are now often used with the march in Sweden, where it is consequently better known by the first line "Viken, tidens flyktiga minnen". It should not be confused with the Narvamarsch, a faster march composed by Anders von Düben the Younger.

In Finland, the march was plaid at the funerals of presidents Carl Gustaf Emil Mannerheim, Urho Kekkonen, Mauno Koivisto and Martti Ahtisaari, and General Adolf Ehrnrooth. In Estonia at the funerals of presidents Lennart Meri and Arnold Rüütel.

Swedish lyrics

Viken, tidens flyktiga minnen!
Stundens fröjder, bleknen, försvinnen!
Natten nedsteg på våra sinnen
Och för skuggorna är vår sång.

Viken, tidens flyktiga minnen!
Stundens fröjder, bleknen, försvinnen!
Natten nedsteg på våra sinnen
Och för skuggorna är vår sång.

Hågkomst av de framfarna dagar
Som oss eldar och oss anklagar!
Gråa gäst, som ej tid försvagar
Följe ditt allvar vår dunkla gång!

Hågkomst av de framfarna dagar
Som oss eldar och oss anklagar!
Gråa gäst, som ej tid försvagar
Följe ditt allvar vår dunkla gång!

English translation

Farewell, fleeting memories of time!
The joys of the moment, fade, disappear!
The night descended on our senses
And for the shadows is our song.

Farewell, fleeting memories of time!
The joys of the moment, fade, disappear!
The night descended on our senses
And for the shadows is our song.

Remembrance of the days gone by
Which burns us and accuses us!
Gray guest, whom time does not weaken
Follow your seriousness our dark path!

Remembrance of the days gone by
Which burns us and accuses us!
Gray guest, whom time does not weaken
Follow your seriousness our dark path!
