= Adolf Ehrnrooth =

Finnish general

Adolf Erik Ehrnrooth
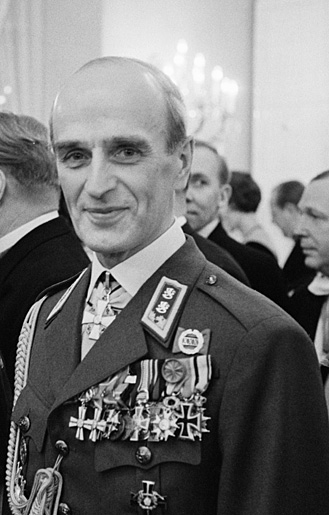
- General Adolf Ehrnrooth at the Finnish Independence Day reception, 1963.
- Born: 9 February 1905; Helsinki, Finland
- Died: 26 February 2004 (aged 99); Turku, Finland
- Burial place: Hietaniemi cemetery, Helsinki
- Military career
- Allegiance: Finland
- Branch: Finnish Army
- Service years: 1922–1965
- Rank: General
- Units: 7th Infantry regiment, 2nd Division
- Conflicts: World War II; Winter War; Continuation War
- Awards: Mannerheim cross Order of the Sword - Grand Cross

Adolf Erik Ehrnrooth (9 February 1905, in Helsinki – 26 February 2004, in Turku) was a Finnish general who served during the Winter and Continuation wars. He also competed in two equestrian events at the 1948 Summer Olympics.

== Early life and education ==
Ehrnrooth's parents were medicine and surgery doctor Ernst Hjalmar Ehrnrooth and Karin Selin. Ehrnrooth was the youngest out of five siblings. His brothers were Lars and Gustaf Ehrnrooth.

Ehrnrooth first went to Svenska normallyceum i Helsingfors and then entered cadet school in 1922 and served in the Uusimaa Dragoon Regiment (Uudenmaan Rakuunarykmentti). Ehrnrooth was a skilled rider and applied for a command at the Swedish Army Riding and Horse-Driving School at Strömsholm Palace in Sweden to further his training. He was accepted to a one-year course that began in August 1928, where the Swedish Prince Gustaf Adolf was also a student.

In 1958 he married a Danish countess Karin-Birgitte Schack who was a lady-in-waiting and a close friend of Queen Ingrid of Denmark. They had three children: Karin, Hans and Eva.

== Military career ==
During the brief Winter War against the Soviet Union, he served on the staffs of the 7th Division and the Cavalry Brigade. When the Continuation War, also against the Soviet Union, broke out in June 1941, he served as the chief of staff of the 2nd Division until he was seriously wounded. After he recovered he was appointed to lead the 7th Infantry Regiment (JR 7) of the 2nd Division. During the battles on the Karelian Isthmus, he was awarded the Mannerheim cross. He also received the Grand Cross of the Royal Swedish Order of the Sword.

After the war, he led an active military career until he retired in 1965.

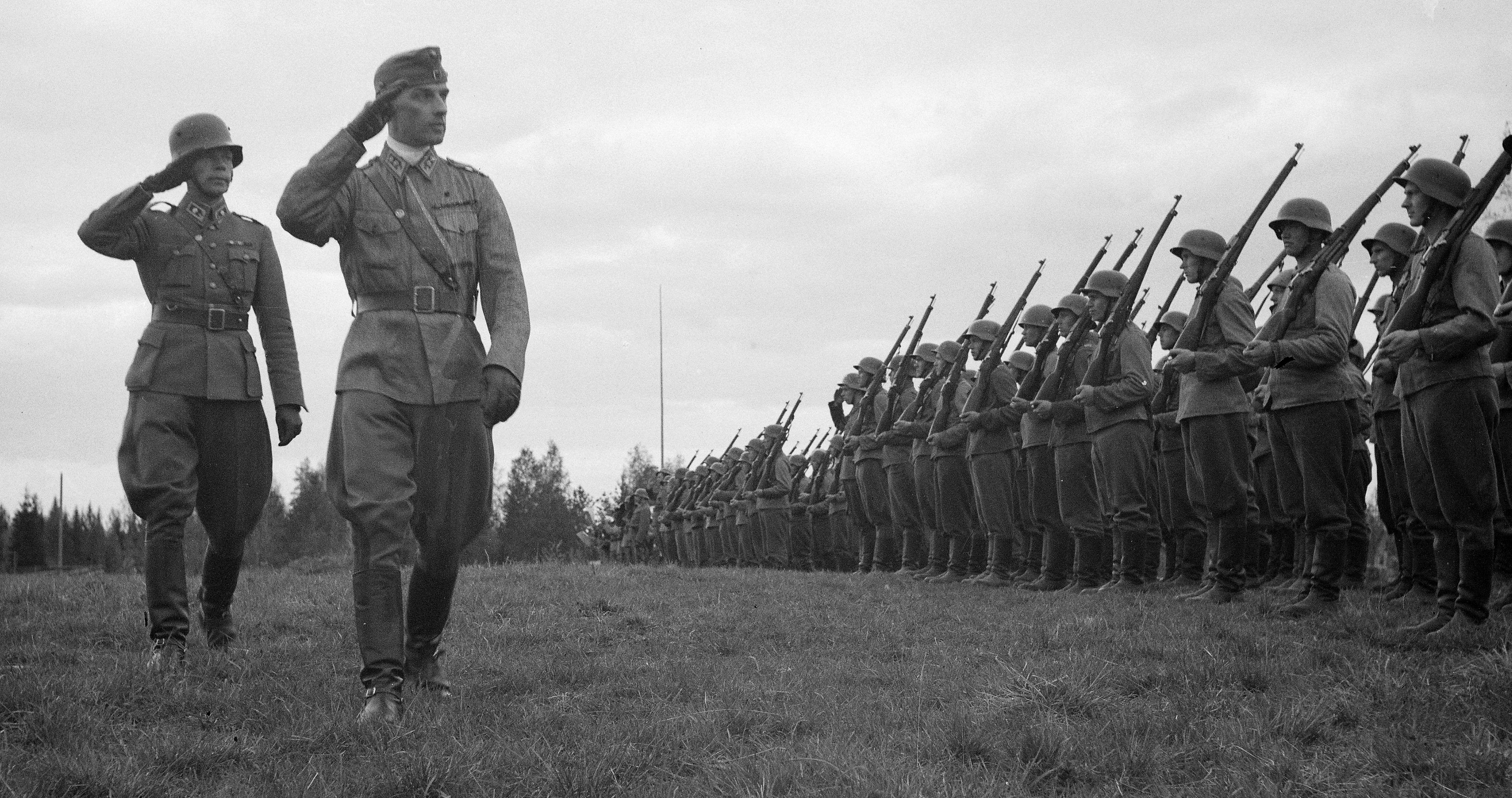
Adolf Ehrnrooth inspecting troops only a few days before Soviet mass offensive in the summer of 1944.

== Later life ==
In the 1970s, Ehrnrooth gave lectures in military schools both in Finland and in Sweden. In the years 1980-1991, he gave a total of 62 written lectures and several without a manuscript. Ehrnrooth also appeared several times on radio and on television.

Ehrnrooth was the face and voice most associated with rehabilitation of the soldiers who secured Finland her independence. The long post-war era during which it simply was not progressive to value the military ended in the early 1990s, at which time his charismatic persona was at its height.

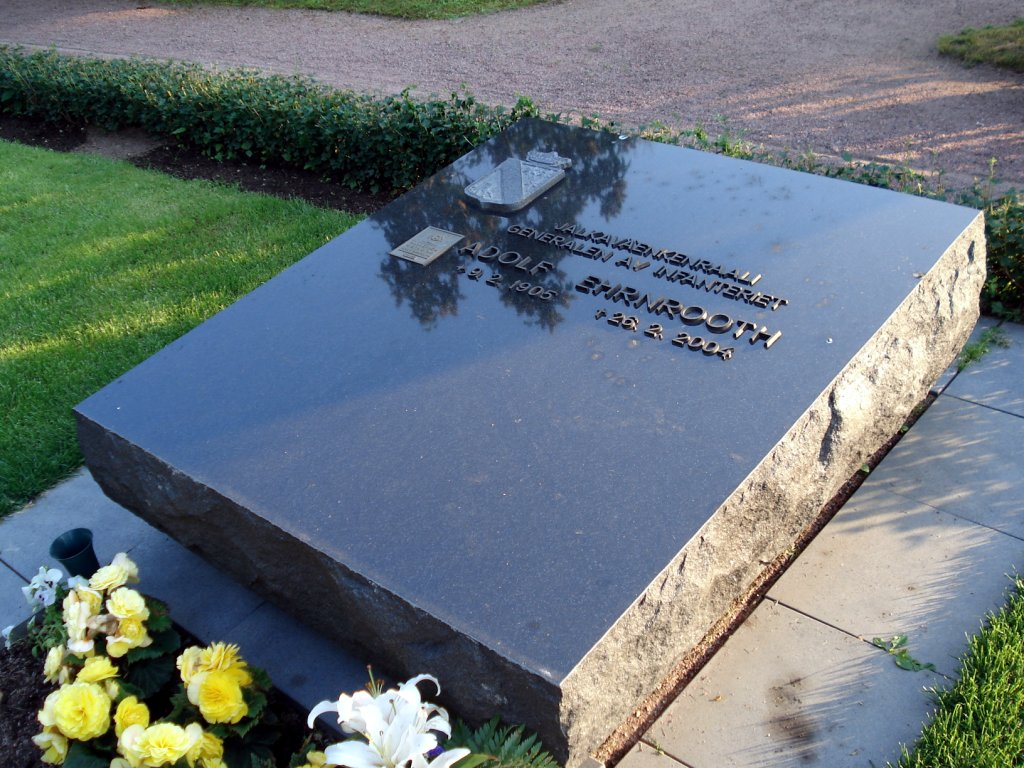
The tombstone of General Adolf Ehrnrooth at the Hietaniemi cemetery in Helsinki. The Narva March, the Finnish military funeral march was plaid at his funeral.

In his last statement (on 17 December 2003) he gave support to ProKarelia (Finnish NGO) and its plan for the Return of Ceded Territories. He said that he defended the borders of Finland declared in the Treaty of Tartu and considered them the only proper borders of Finland and that it was great injustice that the Soviet Union had taken these territories.

General Ehrnrooth died on 26 February 2004, and is buried in Hietaniemi cemetery, Helsinki. He was voted as the 4th greatest Finn of all time by the Finnish public during the Suuret suomalaiset (Great Finns) competition in 2004.

== Awards ==
- Mannerheim Cross (Finland)
- Order of the Cross of Liberty (Finland)
- Order of the White Rose of Finland (Finland)
- Order of the Lion of Finland (Finland)
- Iron Cross (Germany)
- Order of the Dannebrog (Denmark)
- Legion of Honour (France)
- Order of the Cross of Terra Mariana (Estonia, 1998)
- Order of the Sword (Sweden)

== See also ==
- Finnish Defence Forces

== Bibliography ==
- Karin Ehrnrooth: Isäni oli nuori sotilas / Min fader var en ung soldat – Adolf Ehrnrooth, Ajatus Kirjat 2008, ISBN 978-951-20-7497-6
- Adolf Ehrnrooth − Marja-Liisa Lehtonen: Kenraalin testamentti, WSOY 1995.
- Ulla Appelsin: Adolf Ehrnrooth, Kenraalin vuosisata, Ajatus Kirjat 2001.
