= Niels Mikkelsen =

Danish equestrian (1902–1964)

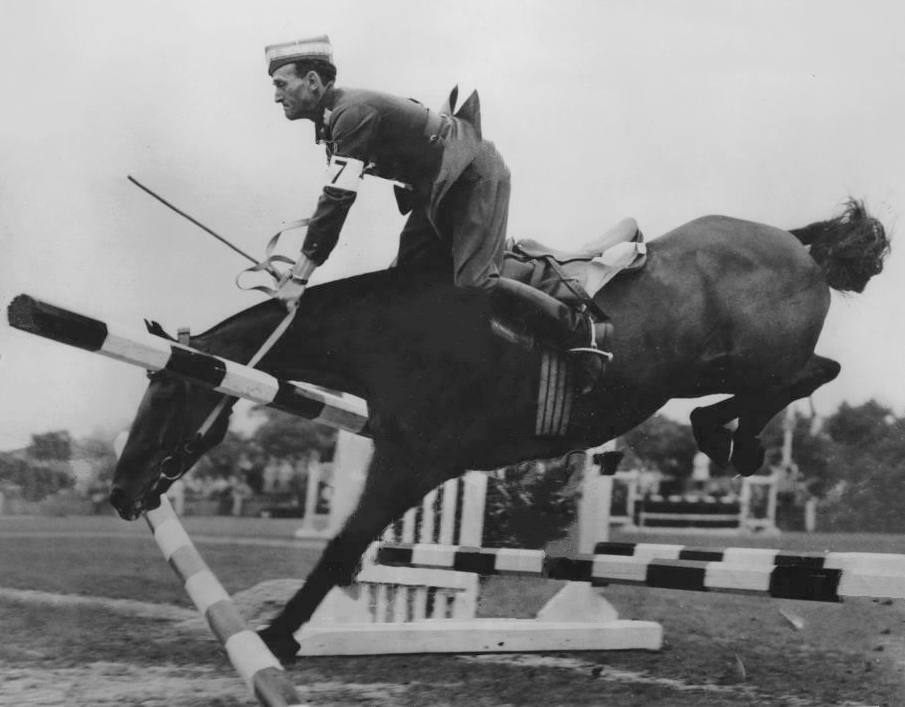
- Mikkelsen at the 1948 Olympics

Personal information
- Nationality: Danish
- Born: 19 March 1902 Favrskov, Denmark
- Died: 14 September 1964 (aged 62) Gentofte, Denmark

Sport
- Sport: Equestrian
- Club: Aarhus Rideklub

Niels Mikkelsen (19 March 1902 – 14 September 1964) was a Danish equestrian. He competed in the individual and team three-day events at the 1948 Summer Olympics, and failed to finish.

Mikkelsen held a rank of captain. He retired from military service in 1955, and later worked at the Circus Benneweis and the Hjortekær riding school.
