= Alfred Blaser =

Swiss equestrian

Personal information
- Nationality: Swiss
- Born: 17 October 1913; Langnau im Emmental, Switzerland
- Died: 23 November 2005 (aged 92); Thun, Switzerland

Sport
- Sport: Equestrian

Alfred Blaser (17 October 1913 – 23 November 2005) was a Swiss equestrian. He competed in two events at the 1948 Summer Olympics.
