= Peter Borwick =

English cricketer (1913–1983)

Peter Malise Borwick (21 November 1913 – 23 December 1983) was an English cricketer active in 1932 who played for Northamptonshire (Northants).

== Biography ==
Borwick was born at Aldby Park in the East Riding of Yorkshire, England on 21 November 1913. He appeared in three first-class matches as a righthanded batsman who bowled left-arm orthodox spin. He scored 25 runs with a highest score of 11 and took three wickets with a best performance of one for 25.

He also competed in two equestrian events at the 1948 Summer Olympics.

Borwick died in Haselbech, Northamptonshire on 23 December 1983, at the age of 70.
