= Lyndon Bolton =

British equestrian (1899–1995)

Personal information
- Nationality: British
- Born: 25 May 1899 Brentford, Middlesex, England
- Died: 7 April 1995 (aged 95) Alnwick, Northumberland, England

Sport
- Country: Great Britain
- Sport: Equestrianism

Brigadier Lyndon Bolton DSO & Bar DL (15 May 1899 – 7 April 1995) was a British Olympic horseman.

== Biography ==
Born in Brentford, Middlesex on 25 May 1899, Lyndon Bolton was educated at Bedford School, between 1906 and 1917, and at the Royal Military Academy, Woolwich. He served in the British Army during the First World War, in 1918, and became a member of the British equestrian team in the 1930s. He served in France and North Africa with the Royal Horse Artillery during the Second World War, and was promoted to the rank of Brigadier in the 15th Scottish Division. He rode for Great Britain in the 1948 Summer Olympics, and finished 27th in the three-day event. He subsequently trained the Ireland Olympic equestrian team for the 1964 Summer Olympics.

Brigadier Lyndon Bolton was invested as a Companion of the Distinguished Service Order in 1941, and again in 1945 He died in Alnwick, Northumberland on 4 April 1995, at the age of 95.

== Publications ==
Thoughts on Riding, 1955, Training the Horse, 1964
