= Fabio Mangilli =

Italian equestrian

Personal information
- Nationality: Italian
- Born: 13 July 1911; Talmassons, Italy
- Died: 9 January 1986 (aged 74); Udine, Italy

Sport
- Sport: Equestrian

Fabio Mangilli (13 July 1911 – 9 January 1986) was an Italian equestrian. He competed in two events at the 1948 Summer Olympics.
