= Arvo Haanpää =

Finnish equestrian

Personal information
- Nationality: Finnish
- Born: 12 September 1898; Jalasjärvi, Finland
- Died: 5 May 1980 (aged 81); Lappeenranta, Finland

Sport
- Sport: Equestrian

Arvo Haanpää (12 September 1898 – 5 May 1980) was a Finnish equestrian. He competed in two events at the 1948 Summer Olympics.
