= Theodora Krarup =

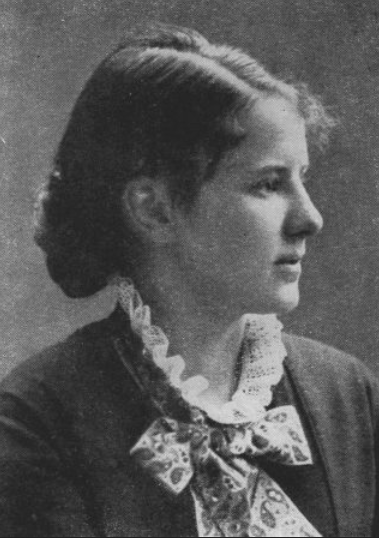
Theodora Krarup

Anna Theodora Ferdinanda Alexandra Krarup (1862–1941) was a Danish portrait painter who was a student of Viggo Johansen at the Royal Danish Academy of Fine Arts and of Jean-Joseph Benjamin-Constant in Paris. She is remembered for the many years she spent in Saint Petersburg before and after the Russian Revolution where in particular she painted portraits of Grigori Rasputin. After returning to Denmark in 1938, she recounted her experiences to the journalist William Haste who published extracts of her memoirs in the Sunday editions of Berlingske Tidende. The full version was published as a book shortly after her death in 1941. The Danish version 42 aar i Czarriget og Sovjet was later translated into English as 42 years in the realm of the Czar and the Soviets.

== Early life and education ==
Born on 21 September 1862 on the Scheelenborg Estate on the island of Funen, Anna Theodora Ferdinanda Alexandra Krarup was the daughter of the estate manager Gottlieb Ferdinandy Krarup (1819–83) and his wife Anne née Jensen (1831–98). After initial training in art in 1885 under Vilhelm Kyhn, she was a pupil of Luise Begas-Parmentier in Berlin (1888). She then attended the Royal Danish Academy where she studied painting under Viggo Johansen and sculpture under August Saabye. In the early 1890s, she studied at the Académie Julian in Paris under Benjamin-Constant. She made a short study trip to Finland in 1896, studying under Albert Edelfelt in Helsinki.

== Career ==
After her stay in Helsinki, Krarup moved to St Petersburg where she soon received a commission from the Danish-born empress Dagmar. Her assignment was to paint a portrait of her late husband Alexander III. Thanks to her success, she was invited to paint other portraits of the imperial family.

She remained in the city after the Russian Revolution. She established a friendship with Rasputin whose portrait she painted several times. In 1938, she was forced by the Soviet authorities to either accept Soviet citizenship or return to Denmark. She chose the latter, taking with her only a few sketches and a single painting. She spent her final years on Copenhagen's Østerbro.

The events she experienced in St Petersborg (later Leningrad) are known from the accounts she gave to the journalist William Haste. Many were published in the Sunday editions of Berlingske Tidende in early 1941. The entire story was published in book form shortly after her death as 42 aar i Czarriget og Sovjet, later translated into English as 42 years in the realm of the Czar and the Soviets.

Theodora Krarup died in Copenhagen on 23 April 1941.
