= Eugenio Montessoro =

Italian equestrian

Personal information
- Nationality: Italian
- Born: 14 January 1912
- Died: 12 December 1998 (aged 86)

Sport
- Sport: Equestrian

Eugenio Montessoro (14 January 1912 – 12 December 1998) was an Italian equestrian. He competed in two events at the 1948 Summer Olympics.
