= Heinrich Sauer =

Austrian equestrian (1912–1981)

Personal information
- Full name: Henrich Emil Anton Sauer
- Nationality: Austrian
- Born: 23 March 1912; Złoczów, Austria-Hungary
- Died: 7 December 1981 (aged 69)

Sport
- Sport: Equestrian

Heinrich Sauer (23 March 1912 – 7 December 1981) was an Austrian equestrian. He competed at the 1936 Summer Olympics and the 1948 Summer Olympics.
