= Francisco Carrere =

Argentine equestrian

Personal information
- Nationality: Argentine
- Born: 6 January 1913
- Died: 9 August 1992 (aged 79)

Sport
- Sport: Equestrian

Francisco Carrere (6 January 1913 – 9 August 1992) was an Argentine equestrian. He competed in two events at the 1948 Summer Olympics.
