= Frank Henry =

American equestrian and military officer (1909–1989)

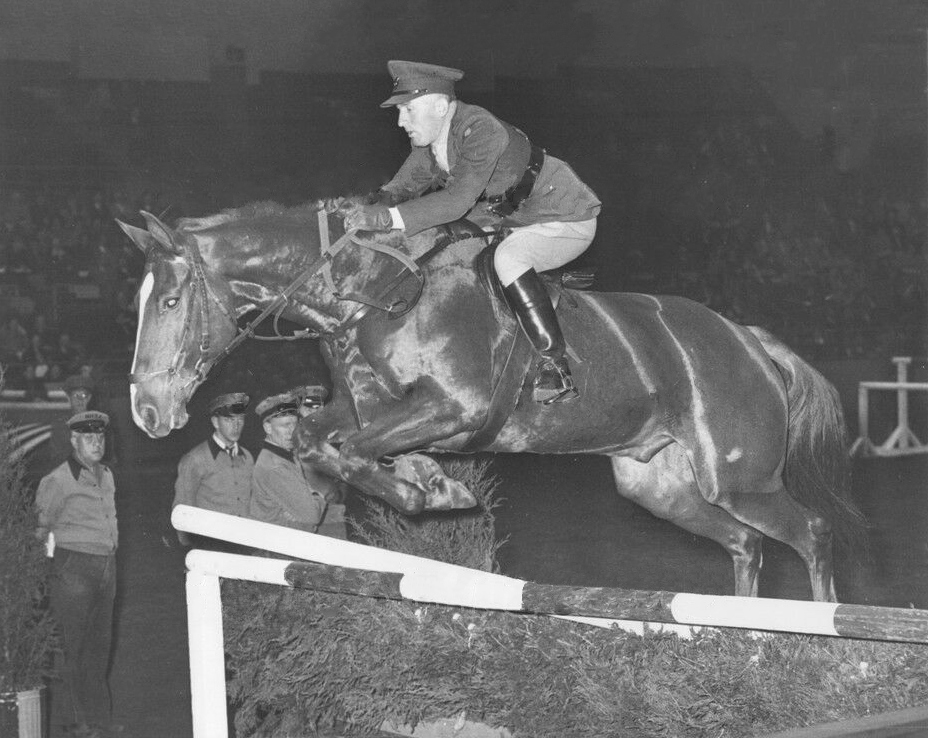
- Henry in 1947

Personal information
- Born: December 15, 1909 Cambridge, New York, U.S.
- Died: August 25, 1989 (aged 79) Chesterfield, Missouri, U.S.

Sport
- Sport: Equestrian
- Club: U.S. Army
Medal record
Representing the United States
Olympic Games
Gold medal – first place	1948 London	Team eventing
Silver medal – second place	1948 London	Individual eventing
Silver medal – second place	1948 London	Team dressage

Frank Sherman Henry (December 15, 1909 – August 25, 1989) was an American equestrian. He competed at the 1948 Summer Olympics and won a gold medal in team eventing and silver medals in individual eventing and team dressage, becoming the only American equestrian to win three medals at one Olympics.

Henry graduated from the United States Military Academy in 1933 and later worked as an instructor at various military stations. He was selected for the 1940 Olympics, but they were canceled due to World War II. During the war he served as at the United States Department of Defense. He retired from the army as a brigade general.

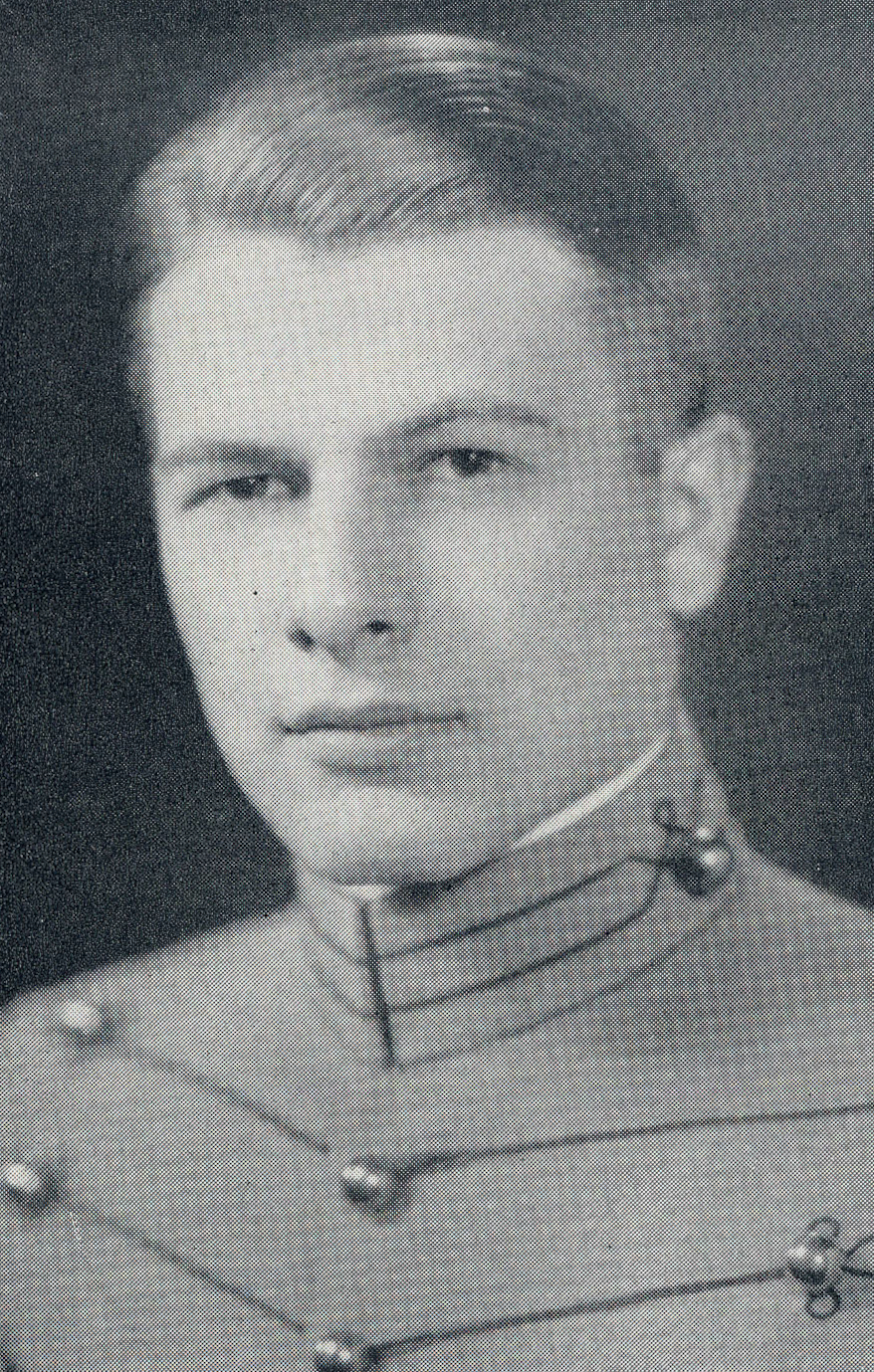
Henry as a United States Military Academy cadet c. 1933
