= Gehnäll Persson =

Swedish equestrian (1910–1976)

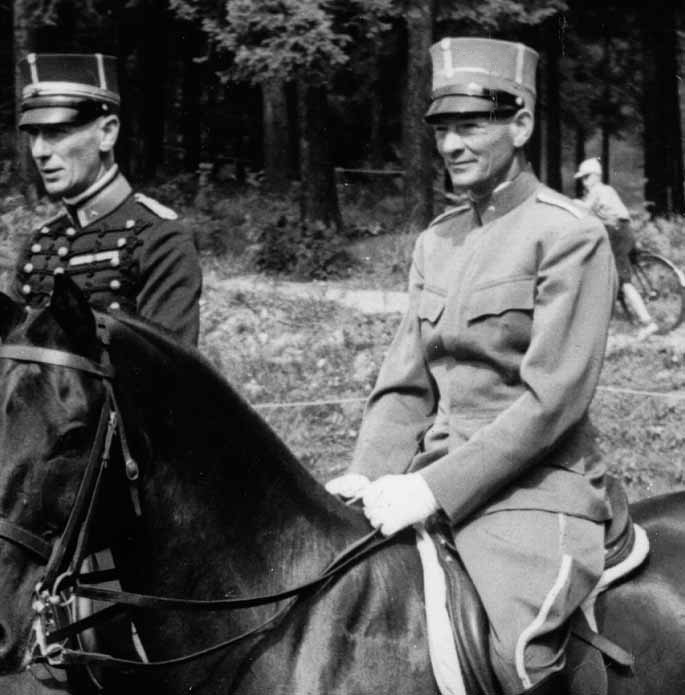
- Persson at the 1952 Olympics

Personal information
- Born: 21 August 1910 Steneby, Sweden
- Died: 16 July 1976 (aged 65) Köping, Sweden

Sport
- Sport: Horse riding
- Club: K4 IF, Umeå
Medal record
Representing Sweden
Olympic Games
| Disqualified | London 1948 | Dressage, Team |
| Gold medal – first place | Helsinki 1952 | Dressage, Team |
| Gold medal – first place | Stockholm 1956 | Dressage, Team |

Gehnäll Persson (21 August 1910 – 16 July 1976) was a Swedish Army fanjunkare and equestrian.

== Career ==
Persson was born on 21 August 1910 in Steneby, Sweden, the son of Sven Persson and Bertha Andersson.

He competed in dressage at the 1948, 1952 and 1956 Olympics and won team gold medals in 1952 and 1956; he finished fourth individually in 1956.

At the 1948 Olympics the Swedish team won with a wide margin and received gold medals. The team was disqualified in 1949 after it was found that Persson was only a fanjunkare, temporarily promoted to the rank of lieutenant specifically to circumvent the "Officers and Gentlemen only" eligibility rule at the time. Later that year the International Federation for Equestrian Sports relaxed its eligibility rule to allow non-commissioned ranks (and women) to compete.

== Personal life ==
In 1938, he married Ruth Jansson (born 1914), the daughter of Richard Jansson and Elin Larsson. He was the father of Lars Ove (born 1943) and Anders (born 1951).

== Awards and decorations ==
- (Sweden) H. M. The King's Medal, 8th size (June 1956)
- (Sweden) Swedish Women's Auxiliary Veterinary Corps' Medal of Merit in Silver (Svenska Blå Stjärnans förtjänstmedalj i silver)
