= Fernando Gazapo =

Spanish equestrian

Personal information
- Nationality: Spanish
- Born: 24 August 1920
- Died: 24 December 2003 (aged 83); Madrid, Spain

Sport
- Sport: Equestrian

Fernando Gazapo (24 August 1920 – 24 December 2003) was a Spanish equestrian. He competed in two events at the 1948 Summer Olympics.
