= Erik Carlsen =

Danish equestrian

Personal information
- Nationality: Danish
- Born: 14 April 1911; Frederiksberg, Denmark
- Died: 29 January 1999 (aged 87); Hovedstaden, Denmark

Sport
- Sport: Equestrian

Erik Carlsen (14 April 1911 – 29 January 1999) was a Danish equestrian. He competed in two events at the 1948 Summer Olympics.
