= Eyüp Yiğittürk =

Turkish equestrian (died 1998)

Personal information
- Nationality: Turkish
- Died: September 1998

Sport
- Sport: Equestrian

Eyüp Yiğittürk (died September 1998) was a Turkish equestrian. He competed in two events at the 1948 Summer Olympics.
