= René Emanuelli =

French equestrian

Personal information
- Full name: René Charles Emanuelli
- Nationality: French
- Born: 28 December 1905; Thônes, France
- Died: 8 September 1992 (aged 86); Nice, France

Sport
- Sport: Equestrian

René Emanuelli (28 December 1905 – 8 September 1992) was a French equestrian. He competed in two events at the 1948 Summer Olympics.
