= Gérard de Balorre =

French equestrian

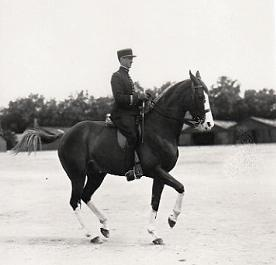

Personal information
- Born: 1899 Paris
- Died: 1974 (aged 74–75) Paris
Medal record
Equestrian
Olympic Games
Representing France
Silver medal – second place	1936 Berlin	Dressage team

Gérard de Balorre (1899–1974) was a French equestrian. He won a silver medal in team dressage at the 1936 Summer Olympics in Berlin, together with André Jousseaume and Daniel Gillois.

== Personal life ==
Balorre was born in Paris on 25 November 1899. He died on 6 December 1974.
