= Daniel Gillois =

French equestrian

Personal information
- Born: 5 February 1888 Fontainebleau
- Died: 28 December 1959 (aged 71) Fontainebleau
Medal record
Equestrian
Olympic Games
Representing France
Silver medal – second place	1936 Berlin	Dressage team

Daniel Gillois (5 February 1888 – 28 December 1959) was a French equestrian. He won a silver medal in team dressage at the 1936 Summer Olympics in Berlin, together with André Jousseaume and Gérard de Balorre.
