= Raúl Campero =

Mexican equestrian (1919–1980)

Medal record

Representing Mexico

Olympic Games

Men's equestrian
Bronze medal – third place	1948 London	Three-Day Event, Team

Raúl Campero Núñez (November 29, 1919 – October 31, 1980) was a Mexican Olympic medalist. He was born in San Blas, Nayarit.
