= Douglas Stewart (equestrian) =

British equestrian

Medal record

Equestrian

Representing United Kingdom

Olympic Games
Gold medal – first place	1952 Helsinki	Show jumping, Team

Lieutenant Colonel Douglas Norman Stewart DSO MC (24 June 1913 – 25 July 1991) was a British equestrian who won a gold medal in the team event at the 1952 Summer Olympics. He was born in Doonholm, South Ayrshire and died in Midlem.
