= Folke Sandström =

Swedish equestrian

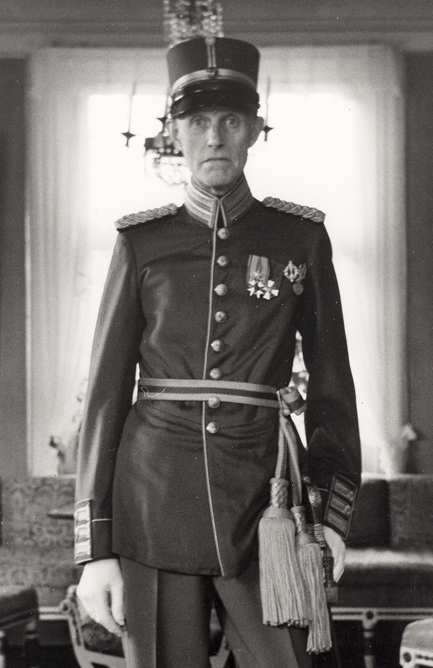

Personal information
- Born: 27 September 1892 Edshult, Alingsås, Sweden
- Died: 18 August 1962 (aged 69) Lidingö, Stockholm, Sweden

Sport
- Sport: Horse riding
- Club: Ing2 IF, Eksjö
Medal record
Representing Sweden
Olympic Games
Bronze medal – third place	1936 Berlin	Team dressage

Einar Folke Emanuel Sandström (27 September 1892 – 18 August 1962) was a Swedish Army officer and horse rider who competed in the 1936 Summer Olympics. He and his horse Pergola finished 15th in the individual dressage and won a bronze medal with the Swedish dressage team.

Sandström became major in the reserve in 1941.

== Awards and decorations ==
- Knight of the Order of the Sword
- Knight First Class of the Order of the White Rose of Finland
