= Gregor Adlercreutz =

Swedish equestrian (1898–1944)

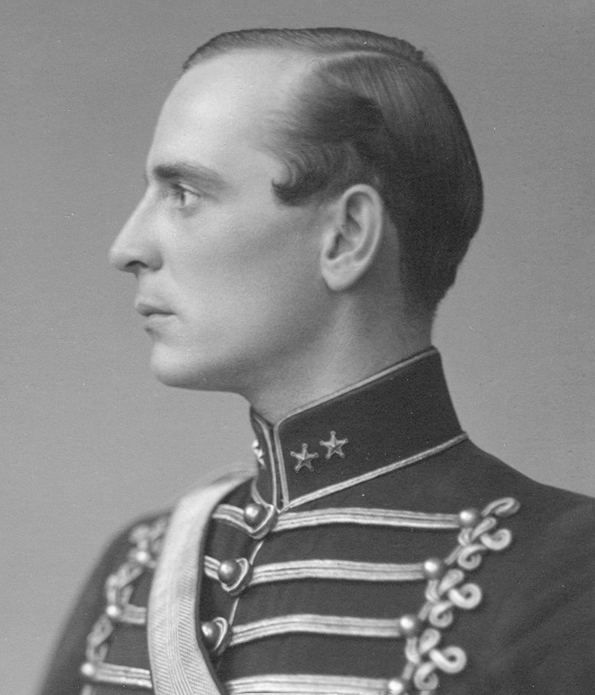

Personal information
- Born: 16 August 1898 Stockholm, Sweden
- Died: 3 June 1944 (aged 45) Strömsholm, Sweden

Sport
- Sport: Horse riding
- Club: K2 IF, Helsingborg
Medal record
Representing Sweden
Olympic Games
Bronze medal – third place	1936 Berlin	Team dressage

Gregor Nils Henric Adlercreutz (16 August 1898 – 3 June 1944) was a Swedish equestrian who competed in the 1936 Summer Olympics. He and his horse Teresina placed fourth in the individual dressage competition and won a bronze medal with the Swedish dressage team. Adlercreutz was captain in the Scanian cavalry regiment and studied at a cavalry school in Hanover in 1937–38. His father Nils was also an Olympic equestrian and headed the Scanian regiment in 1921–27.

Adlercreutz died on 3 June 1944 in Strömsholm and was buried at Norra begravningsplatsen in Solna.
