= Robert Selfelt =

Swedish equestrian

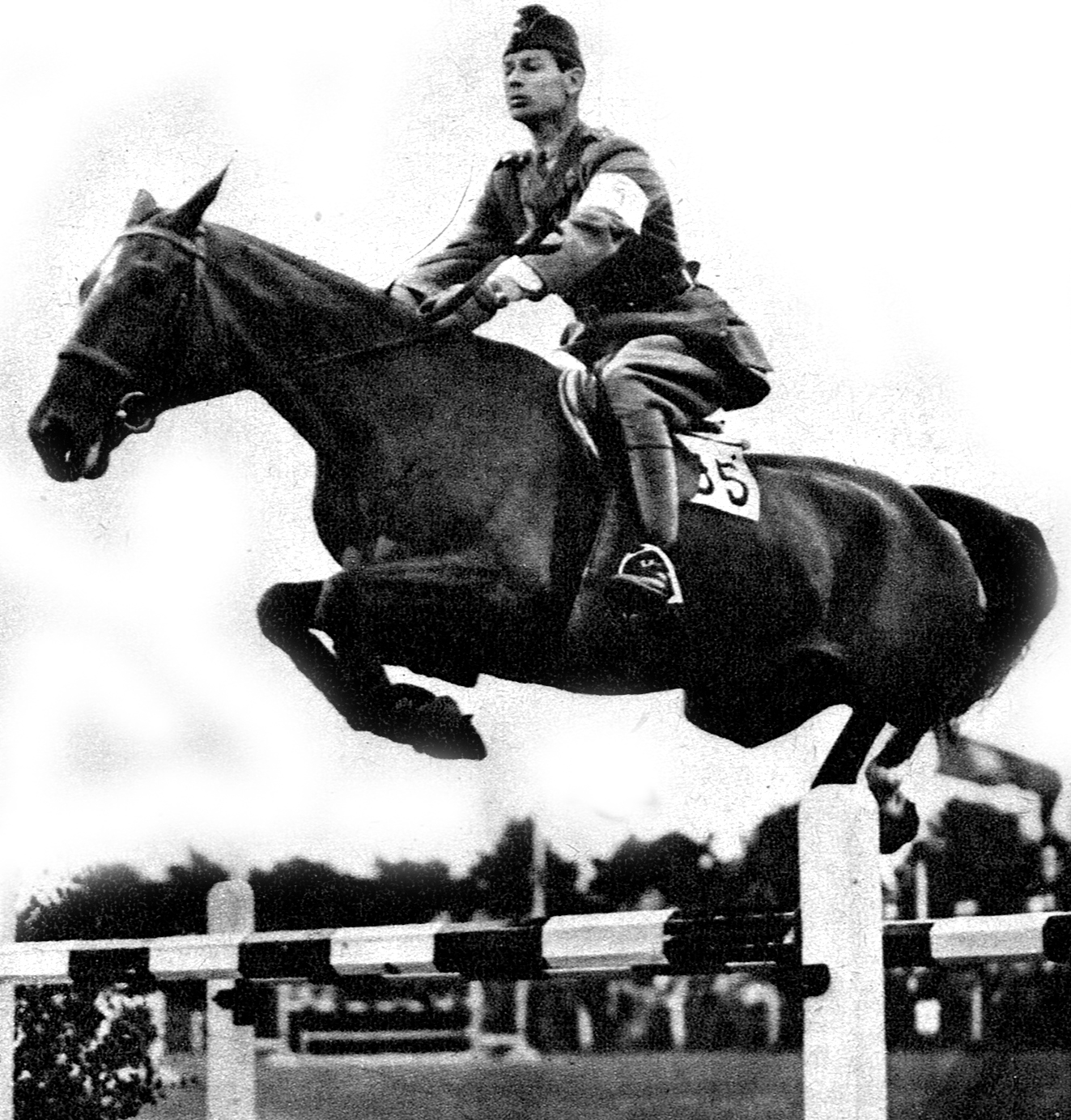

Personal information
- Born: 22 May 1903 Fägre, Sweden
- Died: 24 August 1987 (aged 84) Karlsborg, Sweden

Sport
- Sport: Equestrian
- Club: K4 IF, Umeå
Medal record
Representing Sweden
Olympic Games
Silver medal – second place	1948 London	Team eventing
Bronze medal – third place	1948 London	Individual eventing

Johan Robert Selfelt (22 May 1903 – 24 August 1987) was a Swedish Army officer and horse rider. He competed at the 1948 Summer Olympics and won an individual bronze and team silver medals in eventing.

Selfelt became major in the reserve in 1949.

== Awards and decorations ==
- Knight of the Order of the Sword
- Knight of the Order of Vasa
