= Heinz Pollay =

German dressage horse rider

Medal record

Equestrian

Representing Germany

Olympic Games
Gold medal – first place	1936 Berlin	Dressage individual
Gold medal – first place	1936 Berlin	Dressage team
Bronze medal – third place	1952 Helsinki	Dressage team

Heinz Pollay (4 February 1908 in Köslin, Pomerania – 14 May 1979) was a German (later West German) horse rider who competed in dressage from the late 1930s to the early 1950s. Competing in two Summer Olympics, he won two golds (Dressage individual and Dressage team: both 1936) and one bronze (Dressage team: 1952).

Pollay took the Judge's Oath at the 1972 Summer Olympics in Munich, the first for an official in the Summer Olympics to do so.
