= Sigurd Svensson =

Swedish equestrian

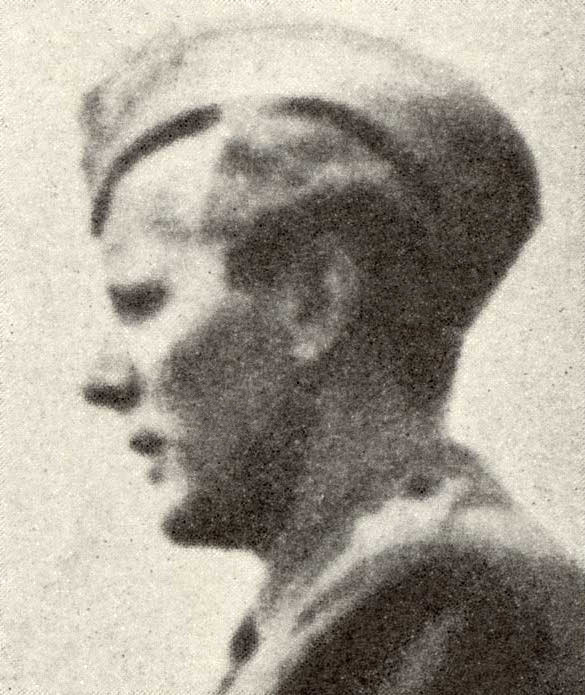

Personal information
- Born: 27 September 1912 Vadsbro, Flen, Sweden
- Died: 13 January 1969 (aged 56) Stockholm, Sweden

Sport
- Sport: Horse riding
- Club: A1 IF, Linköping
Medal record
Representing Sweden
Olympic Games
| Silver medal – second place | 1948 London | Team eventing |

Karl Johan Sigurd Svensson (27 September 1912 – 13 January 1969) was a Swedish horse rider who competed in the 1948 Summer Olympics. He and his horse Dust finished fifteenth in the individual eventing competition and won a silver medal with the Swedish eventing team.
