= Renyldo Ferreira =

Brazilian equestrian (1923–2023)

Medal record

Equestrian

Representing Brazil

Pan American Games
Gold medal – first place	1967 Winnipeg	Team jumping
Silver medal – second place	1959 Chicago	Team jumping

Renyldo Pedro Guimarães Ferreira (29 June 1923 – 28 April 2023) was a Brazilian equestrian who competed in the 1948 Summer Olympics, the 1952 Summer Olympics, the 1956 Summer Olympics, and the 1960 Summer Olympics.

Ferreira died in São Paulo on 28 April 2023, at the age of 99.
