= Humberto Mariles =

Mexican equestrian, Olympic gold medalist and Mexican Army officer

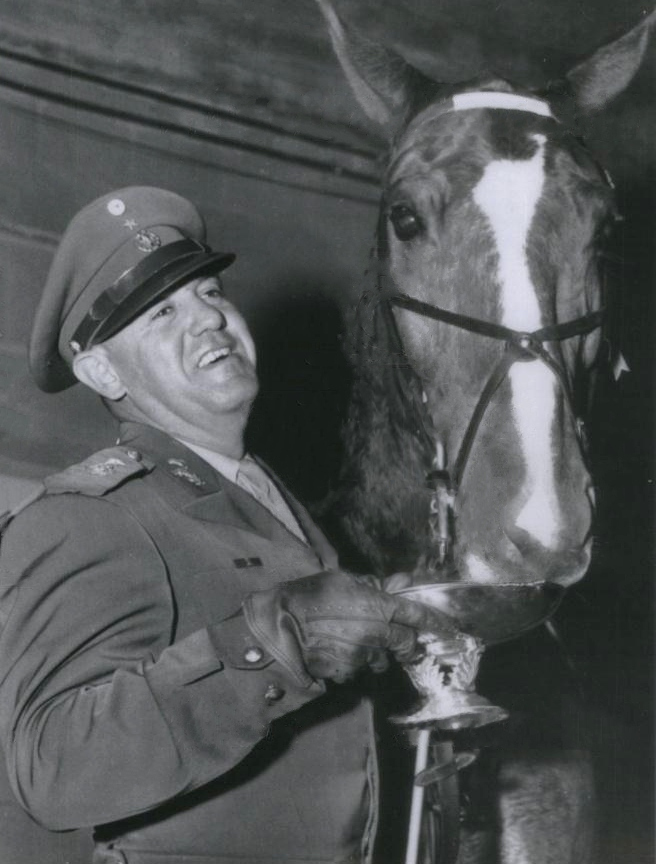
- Mariles in 1956

Personal information
- Born: June 13, 1913 Parral, Chihuahua, Mexico
- Died: December 7, 1972 (aged 59) Paris, France

Sport
- Sport: Equestrian
- Event(s): 1936 Berlin, Germany Olympics Mariles Team represented Mexico
Medal record
Representing Mexico
Olympic Games
Gold medal – first place	1948 London	Individual jumping
Gold medal – first place	1948 London	Team jumping
Bronze medal – third place	1948 London	Team eventing
Pan American Games
Gold medal – first place	1955 Mexico City	Team jumping

Humberto Mariles Cortés (June 13, 1913 – December 7, 1972) was a Mexican equestrian who competed at the 1948, 1952 and 1956 Olympics. He won both individual and team show jumping events in 1948, and placed sixth-ninth in 1956. In 1952 he finished 12th in the individual three-day eventing and won a bronze medal with the team.

At the Pan American Games Mariles won a team gold medal in show jumping in 1955. In 1964 he shot a driver who forced his car off the road. He was sentenced to 25 years in prison, but was released by presidential pardon after five years. In 1972 he was arrested in Paris for drug smuggling, and died in prison before the trial.
