= Bernard Chevallier (equestrian) =

French equestrian (1912–1997)

Medal record

Equestrian

Representing France

Olympic Games
Gold medal – first place	1948 London	Individual eventing

Bernard Chevallier (4 October 1912 – 6 April 1997) was a French equestrian and Olympic champion. He won an individual gold medal in eventing at the 1948 Summer Olympics in London.
