= José Manuel Sagasta =

Argentine equestrian

Personal information
- Nationality: Argentine
- Born: 1912

Sport
- Sport: Equestrian

José Manuel Sagasta (born 1912, date of death unknown) was an Argentine equestrian. He competed in two events at the 1948 Summer Olympics.
