= Fernando Cavaleiro =

Portuguese equestrian

Personal information
- Nationality: Portuguese
- Born: 11 June 1917; Vila Nova da Barquinha, Portugal
- Died: 3 August 2012 (aged 95)

Sport
- Sport: Equestrian

Fernando Cavaleiro (11 June 1917 – 3 August 2012) was a Portuguese equestrian. He competed at the 1948 Summer Olympics, the 1952 Summer Olympics and the 1956 Summer Olympics.
