= Friedrich Gerhard =

German equestrian (1884–1950)

Medal record

Equestrian

Representing Germany

Olympic Games
Gold medal – first place	1936 Berlin	Dressage, Team
Silver medal – second place	1936 Berlin	Dressage, Individual

Friedrich Wilhelm Gerhard (24 July 1884 in Trakehnen – 16 May 1950) was a German equestrian and Olympic champion. He won two Olympic medals at the 1936 Summer Olympics in Berlin.
