= Pál Kémery =

Hungarian equestrian

Personal information
- Nationality: Hungarian
- Born: 15 December 1887; Zirc, Austria-Hungary
- Died: 30 January 1958 (aged 70); Budapest, Hungary

Sport
- Sport: Equestrian

Pál Kémery (15 December 1887 – 30 January 1958) was a Hungarian equestrian. He competed in two events at the 1936 Summer Olympics.
