= Jean Saint-Fort Paillard =

French military officer and equestrian (1913–1990)

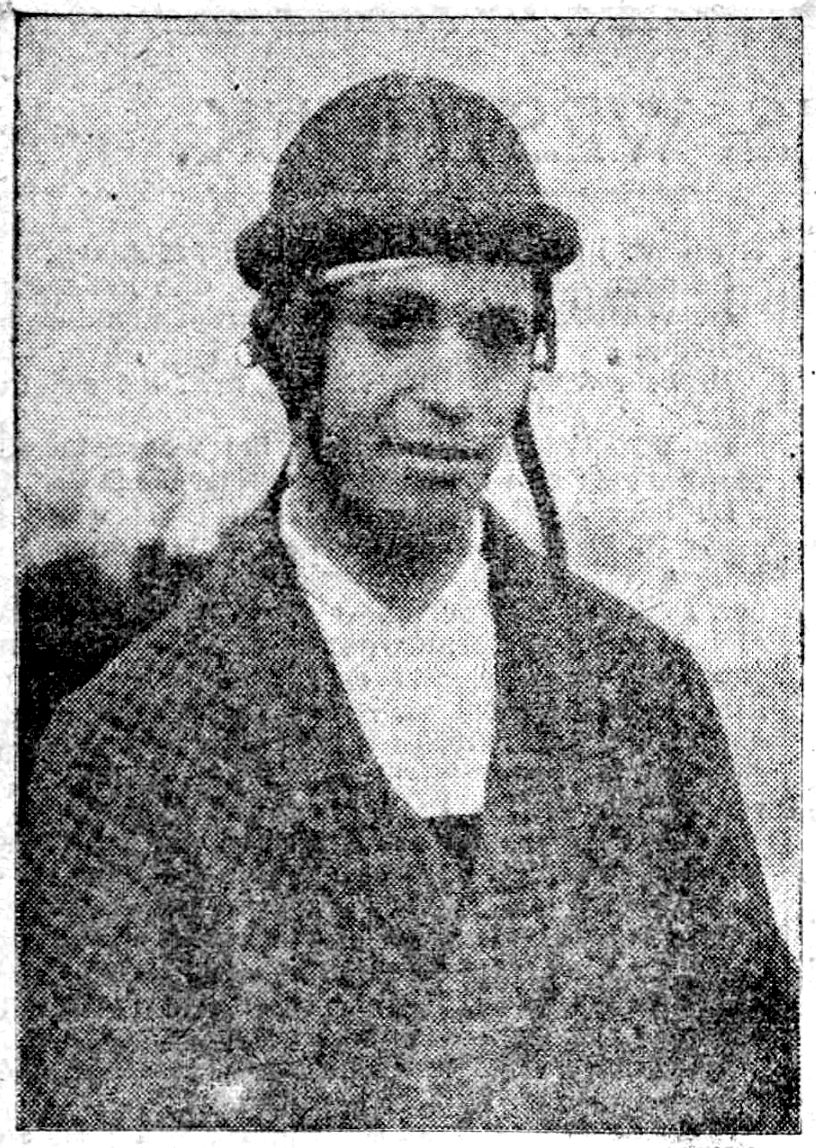

Personal information
- Nationality: French
- Born: 4 August 1913 Saint-Cyr-l'École, France
- Died: 16 January 1990 (aged 76) Pebble Beach, California, U.S.

Sport
- Sport: Equestrian
Medal record
Equestrian
Representing France
Olympic Games
| Gold medal – first place | 1948 London | Team dressage |

Jean Saint-Fort Paillard (4 August 1913 – 16 January 1990) was a French military officer, equestrian and Olympic champion. He won a gold medal in team dressage at the 1948 Summer Olympics in London.

Saint-Fort Paillard was the son of Léon Saint-Fort Paillard.
