= Tweseldown Racecourse =

Racecourse in Fleet, England

Coordinates: 51°15′36″N 0°49′3″W

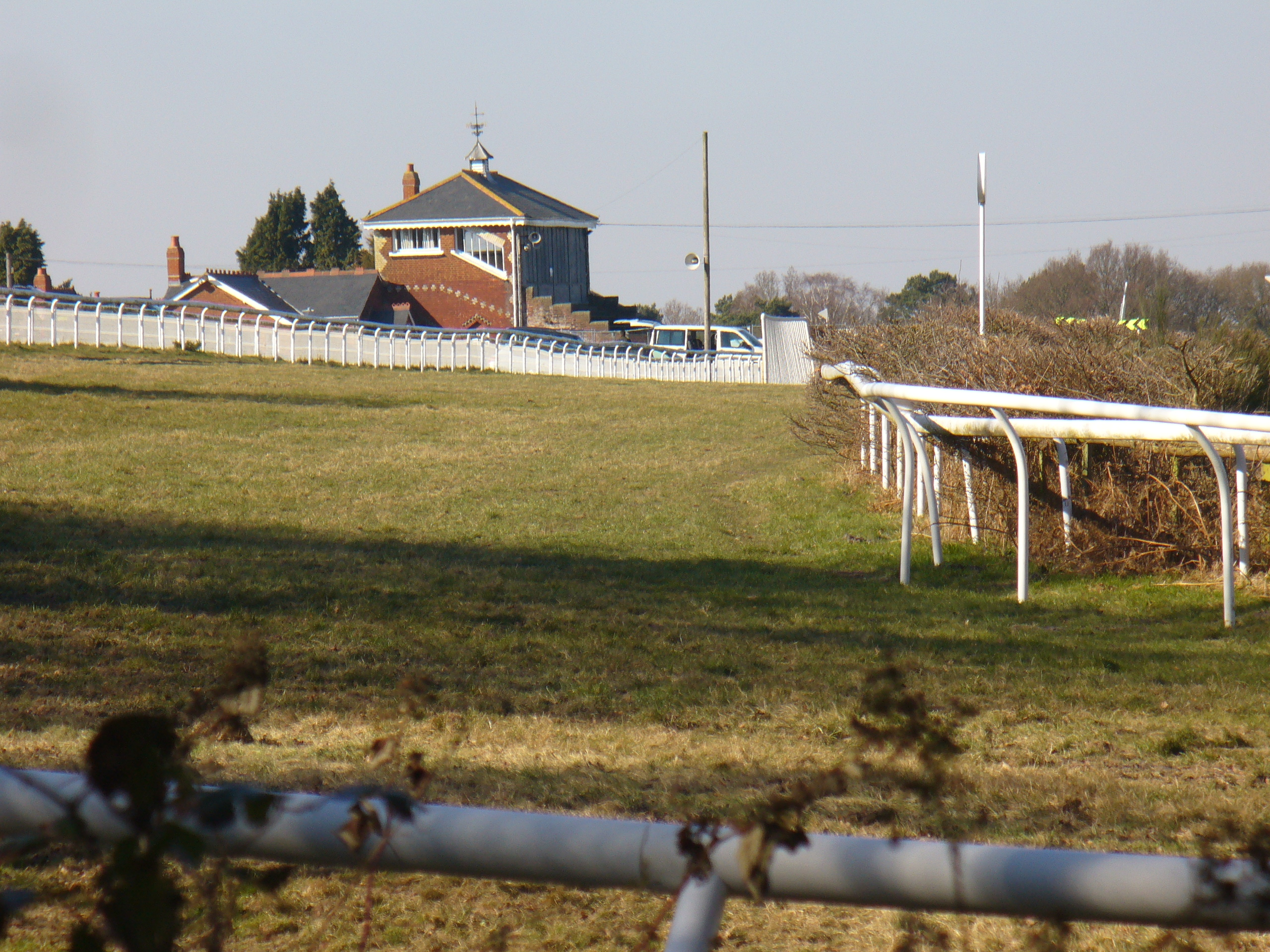
Tweseldown Racecourse

Tweseldown Racecourse southeast of Fleet, Hampshire was originally a National Hunt steeplechasing venue and the home of the equestrian dressage and eventing competitions in the 1948 Summer Olympics.

Until 2012 the venue hosted Point to point racing. Lack of funds caused the owners to cease racing after the 2012 season.

The interior of the course continues to be used for cross country eventing.
