= Gerard le Heux =

Dutch equestrian

Olympic medal record

Men's Equestrian
Bronze medal – third place	1928 Amsterdam	Team dressage

Gerard Willem le Heux (May 7, 1885 in Deventer – June 8, 1973 in The Hague) was a Dutch horse rider who competed in the 1928 Summer Olympics and in the 1936 Summer Olympics.

In the 1928 Summer Olympics he won the bronze medal in the team dressage with his horse Valérine after finishing twelfth in the individual dressage.

Eight years later he finished fifth with the Dutch team in the team dressage and placed nineteenth in the individual dressage.
