= Daniël Camerling Helmolt =

Dutch equestrian

Personal information
- Full name: Daniël Adolf Camerling Helmolt
- Nationality: Dutch
- Born: 9 May 1886; Haarlem, Netherlands
- Died: 18 September 1960 (aged 74); Nijmegen, Netherlands

Sport
- Sport: Equestrian

Daniël Adolf Camerling Helmolt (9 May 1886 – 18 September 1960) was a Dutch equestrian. He competed in two events at the 1936 Summer Olympics.
