= Joaquín Solano =

Mexican equestrian

Medal record

Representing Mexico

Olympic Games

Men's equestrian
Bronze medal – third place	1948 London	Three-Day Event, Team

Joaquín Solano (June 2, 1913 – February 15, 2003) was a Mexican Olympic medalist in equestrianism. He was born in Chicontepec de Tejeda, Veracruz.
