= Albert Dolleschall =

Austrian equestrian

Personal information
- Nationality: Austrian
- Born: 26 July 1887; Vienna, Austria-Hungary
- Died: 14 September 1939 (aged 52); Glina, Poland

Sport
- Sport: Equestrian

Albert Dolleschall (26 July 1887 – 14 September 1939) was an Austrian equestrian. He competed in two events at the 1936 Summer Olympics.
