= László von Magasházy =

Hungarian equestrian

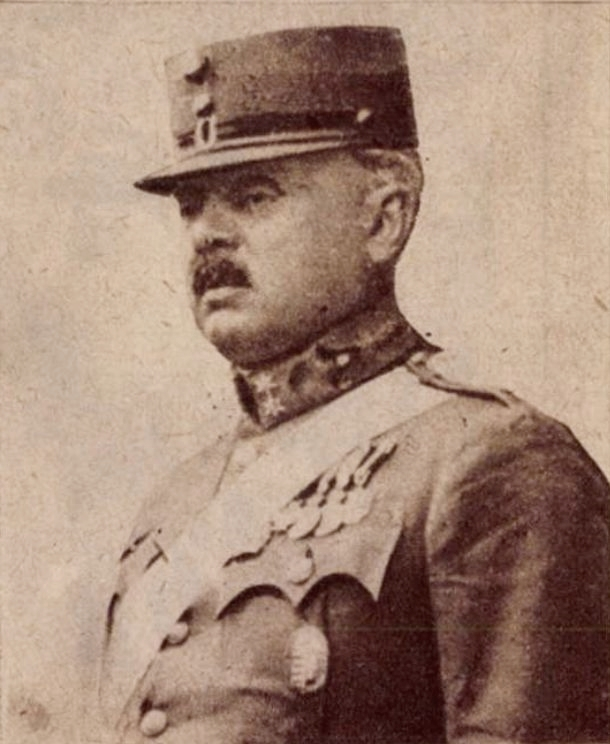

Personal information
- Nationality: Hungarian
- Born: 7 January 1879; Sárkeresztúr, Austria-Hungary
- Died: 5 October 1959 (aged 80); Szentes, Hungary

Sport
- Sport: Equestrian

László von Magasházy (7 January 1879 – 5 October 1959) was a Hungarian equestrian. He competed in two events at the 1936 Summer Olympics.
