= Santiago Martínez (equestrian) =

Spanish equestrian (1912–2004)

Personal information
- Full name: Santiago Martínez Larraz
- Nationality: Spanish
- Born: 7 December 1912 Zaragoza, Spain
- Died: 31 March 2004 (aged 91)

Sport
- Sport: Equestrian

Santiago Martínez Larraz (7 December 1912 – 31 March 2004) was a Spanish equestrian. He competed in two events at the 1948 Summer Olympics. Martínez died on 31 March 2004, at the age of 91.
