= Anísio da Rocha =

Brazilian modern pentathlete

Personal information
- Born: 13 October 1912

Sport
- Sport: Modern pentathlon, equestrian

Anísio da Rocha (born 13 October 1912, date of death unknown) was a Brazilian modern pentathlete and equestrian. He competed in the modern pentathlon at the 1936 Summer Olympics and in the equestrian at the 1948 Summer Olympics.

== Military career ==
He was part of the 1966 class of the War College. Dedicated to equestrianism in the ranks of the Brazilian Army.

== Sporting career ==
Colonel Anísio da Silva Rocha represented Brazil at the 1936 Olympic Games in Berlin, where he came 39th in the individual modern pentathlon.

He also took part in the 1948 Olympic Games in London, in the individual and complete equestrian events.

He was president of the Brazilian Equestrian Confederation between 1976 and 1980.
