= Charles Anderson (equestrian) =

American equestrian (1914–1993)

Olympic medal record

Men's equestrian

Representing the United States

Olympic Games
Gold medal – first place	1948 London	Team eventing

Charles Howard Anderson (October 24, 1914 – March 27, 1993) was an American equestrian who won a gold medal for eventing at the 1948 Summer Olympics.

== Military career ==
Anderson graduated from the United States Military Academy at West Point in 1938 and went on to serve as a career officer in the U.S. Army, retiring in 1966 at the rank of full colonel. During World War II, he was a member of the Airborne Division.
