= Luís Mena e Silva =

Portuguese equestrian

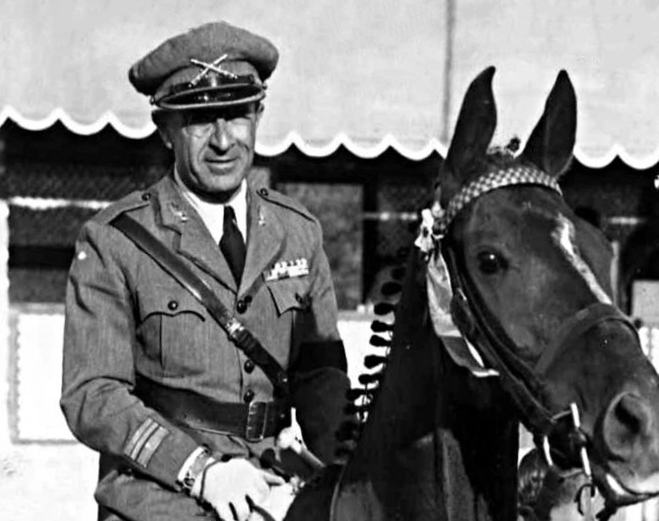

Personal information
- Born: 24 January 1902 Abrantes, Portugal
- Died: 3 August 1963 (aged 61) Lisbon, Portugal
- Height: 167 cm (5 ft 6 in)
- Weight: 62 kg (137 lb)

Sport
- Sport: Equestrianism
- Event(s): Show jumping, dressage
Medal record
Representing Portugal
Bronze medal – third place	1936 Berlin	Team jumping
Bronze medal – third place	1948 London	Team dressage

Luís Falcão de Mena e Silva (24 January 1902 – 3 August 1963) was a Portuguese horse rider. He competed in show jumping at the 1936 Summer Olympics and in dressage at the 1948 and 1960 Games. In 1936 he and his horse Fossette won a team bronze medal, after finishing 21st individually. In 1948 he won another team bronze medal with his horse Fascinante, and placed twelfth in the individual competition.
