= Salih Koç =

Turkish equestrian

Personal information
- Nationality: Turkish
- Born: 18 June 1917; Ankara, Turkey
- Died: 17 May 2000 (aged 82); Istanbul, Turkey

Sport
- Sport: Equestrian

Salih Koç (18 June 1917 – 17 May 2000) was a Turkish equestrian. He competed at the 1948 Summer Olympics, the 1956 Summer Olympics and the 1960 Summer Olympics.
