= Maurice Buret =

French military officer and equestrian

Medal record

Equestrian

Representing France

Olympic Games
Gold medal – first place	1948 London	Team dressage

Maurice Buret (21 May 1909 – 23 August 2003) was a French military officer, equestrian, and Olympic champion. He won a gold medal in team dressage at the 1948 Summer Olympics in London.

== Military awards ==
- Legion of Honour (Chevalier)
- Croix de Guerre with a gilt silver star
