= Gusztáv von Pados =

Hungarian equestrian

Personal information
- Nationality: Hungarian
- Born: 11 October 1881; Kőszeg, Austria-Hungary
- Died: 30 September 1963 (aged 81); Budapest, Hungary

Sport
- Sport: Equestrian

Gusztáv von Pados (11 October 1881 – 30 September 1963) was a Hungarian equestrian. He competed in two events at the 1936 Summer Olympics.
