= Francisco Valadas =

Portuguese equestrian

Personal information
- Born: 2 January 1906
Medal record
Equestrian
Olympic Games
Representing Portugal
| Bronze medal – third place | 1948 London | Dressage team |

Francisco Valadas Júnior (born 2 January 1906, date of death unknown) was a Portuguese equestrian. He placed tenth in individual dressage, and won a bronze medal in team dressage at the 1948 Summer Olympics in London. He competed in dressage at the 1952 Summer Olympics in Helsinki. His horse was 'Feitico'.
