= Robert Borg =

American military officer and equestrian (1913–2005)

Personal information
- Born: Robert John Borg; May 27, 1913 Manila, Philippines
- Died: April 5, 2005 (aged 91) Oxford, Michigan, U.S.
Medal record
Equestrian
Representing the United States
Olympic Games
Silver medal – second place	1948 London	Team dressage
Pan American Games
Silver medal – second place	1955 Mexico City	Individual dressage

Robert John Borg (May 27, 1913 – April 5, 2005) was an American military officer and equestrian. He was born in Manila, Philippines. He placed fourth in individual dressage, and won a silver medal in team dressage at the 1948 Summer Olympics in London. He participated at the 1952 Summer Olympics in Helsinki, and at the 1956 Summer Olympics in Melbourne.
