= Olof Stahre =

Swedish equestrian (1909–1988)

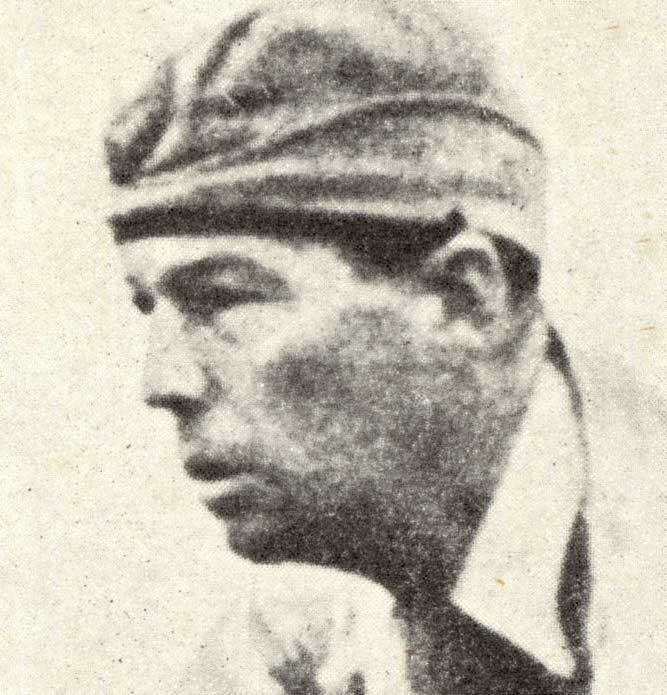

Personal information
- Full name: Nils Olof Stahre
- Born: 19 April 1909 Lerum, Sweden
- Died: 7 March 1988 (aged 78) Blentarp, Sweden

Sport
- Sport: Horse riding
- Club: T1 IF, Linköping; T2 IF, Skövde
Medal record
Representing Sweden
Olympic Games
| Gold medal – first place | 1952 Helsinki | Team eventing |
| Silver medal – second place | 1948 London | Team eventing |

Nils Olof Stahre (19 April 1909 – 7 March 1988) was a Swedish Army officer and horse rider who competed in the 1948 and 1952 Summer Olympics.

In 1948 he and his horse Komet won a silver medal in the team eventing, after finishing fifteenth in the individual competition. Four years later they won a gold medal in the team eventing and finished eighth individually.

After the 1952 Games Stahre became a coach and led Petrus Kastenman to the 1956 Olympic gold medal.

Stahre became major in the reserve in 1955.

== Awards and decorations ==
- (Sweden) Knight of the Order of the Sword (1954)
