= Julio César Sagasta =

Argentine equestrian

Personal information
- Nationality: Argentine
- Born: 13 July 1914

Sport
- Sport: Equestrian
Medal record
Equestrian
Representing Argentina
Pan American Games
Gold medal – first place	1951 Buenos Aires	Individual eventing
Gold medal – first place	1951 Buenos Aires	Team eventing

Julio César Sagasta (born 13 July 1914, date of death unknown) was an Argentine equestrian. He competed at the 1948 Summer Olympics and the 1952 Summer Olympics.
