= Aëcio Coelho =

Brazilian modern pentathlete

Personal information
- Full name: Aëcio Morrot Coelho
- Born: 3 May 1925
- Died: 14 March 1984 (aged 58)

Sport
- Sport: Modern pentathlon, equestrian

Aëcio Morrot Coelho (3 May 1925 – 14 March 1984) was a Brazilian modern pentathlete and equestrian. He competed at the 1948 Summer Olympics.
