= Kai Aage Krarup =

Danish equestrian (1915–2013)

Kai Aage Krarup (22 April 1915 – 14 April 2013) was a Danish equestrian who competed in the 1948 Summer Olympics. He died on 14 April 2013, at the age of 97.
