= František Jandl =

Czech equestrian

Personal information
- Nationality: Czech
- Born: 27 October 1905
- Died: 28 November 1984 (aged 79)

Sport
- Sport: Equestrian

František Jandl (27 October 1905 – 28 November 1984) was a Czech equestrian. He competed in two events at the 1936 Summer Olympics.
