= Fernando Paes =

Portuguese equestrian

Personal information
- Born: 24 May 1907
- Died: 19 May 1972 (aged 64)
Medal record
Equestrian
Olympic Games
Representing Portugal
Bronze medal – third place	1948 London	Dressage team

Fernando Paes (24 May 1907 – 19 May 1972) was a Portuguese equestrian. He placed ninth in individual dressage, and won a bronze medal in team dressage at the 1948 Summer Olympics in London. He also competed in eventing at the 1948 Olympics. He competed in dressage at the 1952 Summer Olympics in Helsinki.
