= André Jousseaume =

French equestrian (1894–1960)

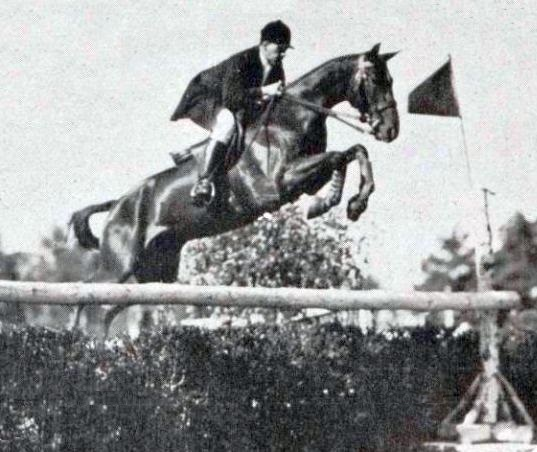

Medal record

Equestrian

Representing France

Olympic Games
Gold medal – first place	1932 Los Angeles	Team dressage
Gold medal – first place	1948 London	Team dressage
Silver medal – second place	1936 Berlin	Team dressage
Silver medal – second place	1948 London	Individual dressage
Bronze medal – third place	1952 Helsinki	Individual dressage

André Jousseaume (27 July 1894 in Yvré-l'Évêque – 26 May 1960 in Chantilly) was a French equestrian and Olympic champion. He won a gold medal in team dressage at the 1932 Summer Olympics in Los Angeles, and another gold medal at the 1948 Summer Olympics in London.
