= Equestrian events at the 1948 Summer Olympics =

Coordinates: 51.2604°N 0.7713°W

Equestrian at the Games of the XIV Olympiad
- Venue: Aldershot; Tweseldown Racecourse; Empire Stadium
- Dates: 9–14 August 1948
- No. of events: 6
- Competitors: 103 from 17 nations

The equestrian events at the 1948 London Summer Olympics included dressage, eventing, and show jumping. All three disciplines had both individual and team competitions. The competitions were held from 9 to 14 August 1948, with the first five days held in the military complex at Aldershot, the endurance day on the army grounds of Aldershot at Tweseldown, and the jumping at the Empire Stadium in Wembley. World War II resulted in a greatly reduced number of competitors, including the absence of Germany, although Brazil made its first appearance in the equestrian events. 103 entries from 17 nations (Argentina, Austria, Brazil, Denmark, Finland, France, Great Britain, Ireland, Italy, Mexico, the Netherlands, Portugal, Spain, Sweden, Switzerland, Turkey, and the United States) competed. The youngest participant was Aëcio Coelho from Brazil at 23 years old, while the oldest rider was the Italian Alessandro, Count Bettoni Cazzago, at 55 years old.

== Disciplines ==
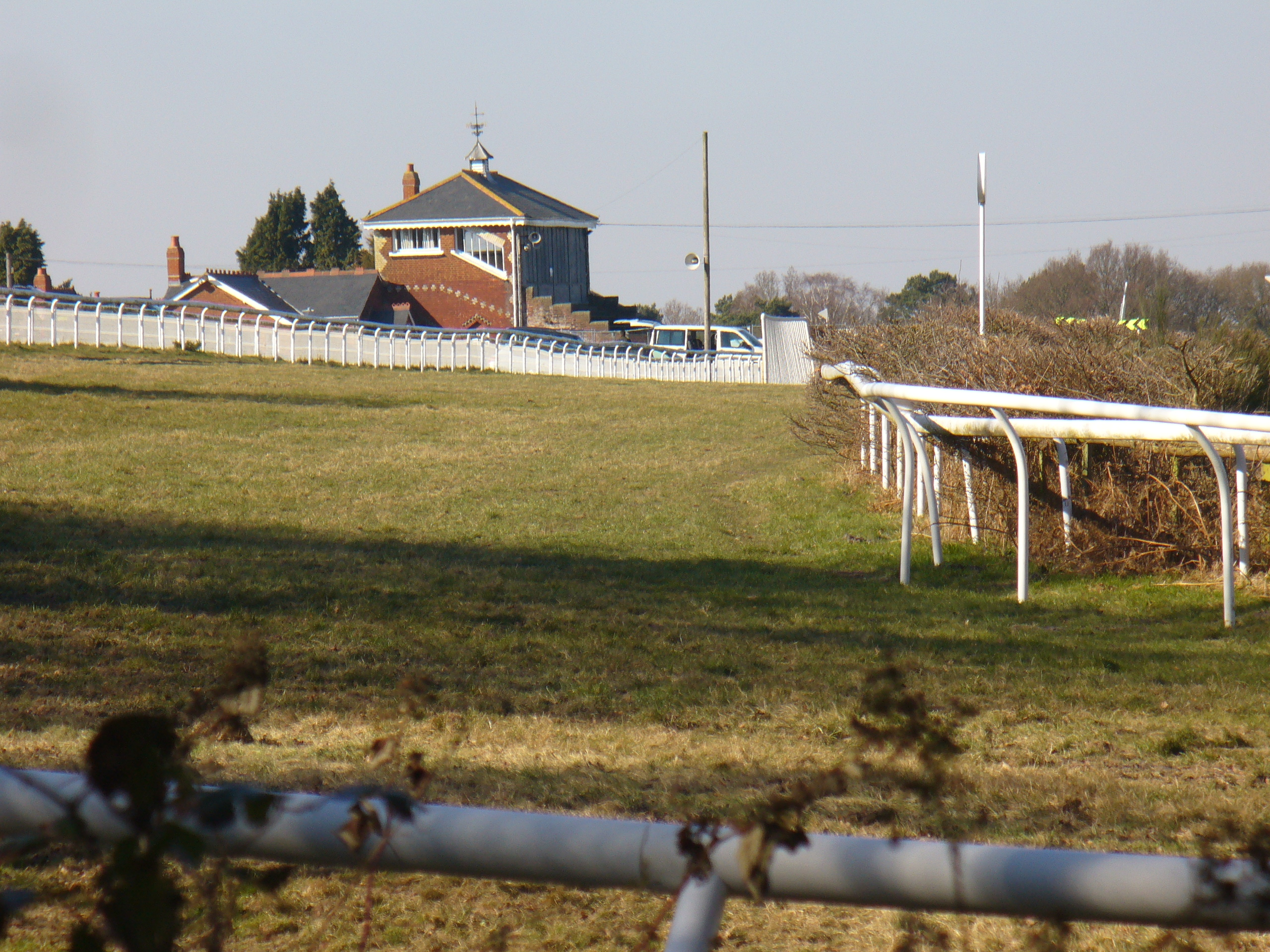
Tweseldown racecourse, site of the endurance day of eventing at the 1948 Olympics

=== Jumping ===
44 riders from 15 nations contested the 16-obstacle/19-jumping effort course. The 870 meter course had fences up to 1.60 meters in height, and was very slippery due to heavy rains during the week. One round of jumping was used for both team and individual competition.

=== Dressage ===
The dressage event had 19 riders from 9 nations. Since World War II had made training dressage horses hard, the difficulty of the test was reduced and only asked for 13 minutes of work with neither piaffe nor passage included. Only 3 judges were used rather than the traditional 5. Horses were also required to be ridden in an English saddle with a double bridle. They were not allowed to use martingales, bearing reins, bandages, gaiters or blinkers.

=== Eventing ===
45 riders for 16 countries rode in the eventing competition. Like the dressage competition, the requirements of the eventing were reduced. This included a shortened (3500 meter) steeplechase, lowering the speed of the roads and tracks phases from 240 to 220 meters/minute, and a shortened cross-country course at 33.5 km (compared to Berlin's 36 km course in 1936). The maximum height of both the cross-country and jumping were raised from 1.15 to 1.20 meters. The ground and terrain of the course were also challenging, taking place over difficult footing on a hilly course.

== Medal summary ==
Games	Gold	Silver	Bronze
Individual dressage	Hans Moser and Hummer; Switzerland	André Jousseaume and Harpagon; France	Gustaf Adolf Boltenstern Jr. and Trumf; Sweden
Team dressage	France; André Jousseaume and Harpagon; Jean Saint-Fort Paillard and Sous les Ceps; Maurice Buret and Saint Quen	United States; Robert Borg and Klingsor; Earl Foster Thomson and Pancraft; Frank Henry and Reno Overdo	Portugal; Fernando Paes and Matamas; Francisco Valadas and Feitiço; Luís Mena e Silva and Fascinante
Individual eventing	Bernard Chevallier and Aiglonne; France	Frank Henry and Swing Low; United States	Robert Selfelt and Claque; Sweden
Team eventing	United States; Frank Henry and Swing Low; Charles Anderson and Reno Palisade; Earl Foster Thomson and Reno Rhythm	Sweden; Robert Selfelt and Claque; Olof Stahre and Komet; Sigurd Svensson and Dust	Mexico; Humberto Mariles Cortés and Parral; Raúl Campero and Tarahumara; Joaquín Solano and Malinche
Individual Jumping	Humberto Mariles Cortés and Arete; Mexico	Rubén Uriza and Hatuey; Mexico	Jean-François d'Orgeix and Sucre de Pomme; France
Team jumping	Mexico; Humberto Mariles Cortés and Arete; Rubén Uriza and Hatuey; Alberto Valdés and Chihuahua	Spain; Jaime García and Bizarro; José Navarro Morenés and Quórum; Marcellino Gavilán and Forajido	Great Britain; Harry Llewellyn and Foxhunter; Henry Nicoll and Kilgeddin; Arthur Carr and Monty

== Medal table ==
Rank	Nation	Gold	Silver	Bronze	Total
1	France	2	1	1	4
1	Mexico	2	1	1	4
3	United States	1	2	0	3
4	Switzerland	1	0	0	1
5	Sweden	0	1	2	3
6	Spain	0	1	0	1
7	Great Britain	0	0	1	1
7	Portugal	0	0	1	1
Totals (8 entries)		6	6	6	18

== Participating nations ==
- Argentina (9)
- Austria (2)
- Brazil (6)
- Denmark (6)
- Finland (5)
- France (8)
- Great Britain (6)
- Ireland (3)
- Italy (6)
- Mexico (6)
- Netherlands (5)
- Portugal (8)
- Spain (7)
- Sweden (9)
- Switzerland (4)
- Turkey (6)
- United States (8)

== Officials ==
Appointment of officials was as follows:

Dressage

- (France) Albert-Eugène-Édouard Decarpentry (Ground Jury President)
- (Sweden) Carl Bonde (Ground Jury Member)
- (Switzerland) Max Thommen (Ground Jury Member)

Jumping

- (France) Xavier Bizard (Ground Jury President)
- (United Kingdom) Henry Somerset (Ground Jury Member)
- (Sweden) Arne Francke (Ground Jury Member)
- (United Kingdom) Michael Ansell (Course Designer)
- (United Kingdom) Phillip Blackmore (Course Designer)
- (Switzerland) Ernest Haccius (Technical Delegate)

Eventing

- (Belgium) Gen. de Landrain (Ground Jury President)
- (Italy) Ranieri, Count Di Campello (Ground Jury Member)
- (Switzerland) Ernst A. Sarasin (Ground Jury Member)
- (Spain) Roger Moeremans d'Emaüs (Technical Delegate)
