= Equestrian at the 1936 Summer Olympics – Individual jumping =

Equestrian at the Olympics

Individual jumping at the Games of the XI Olympiad
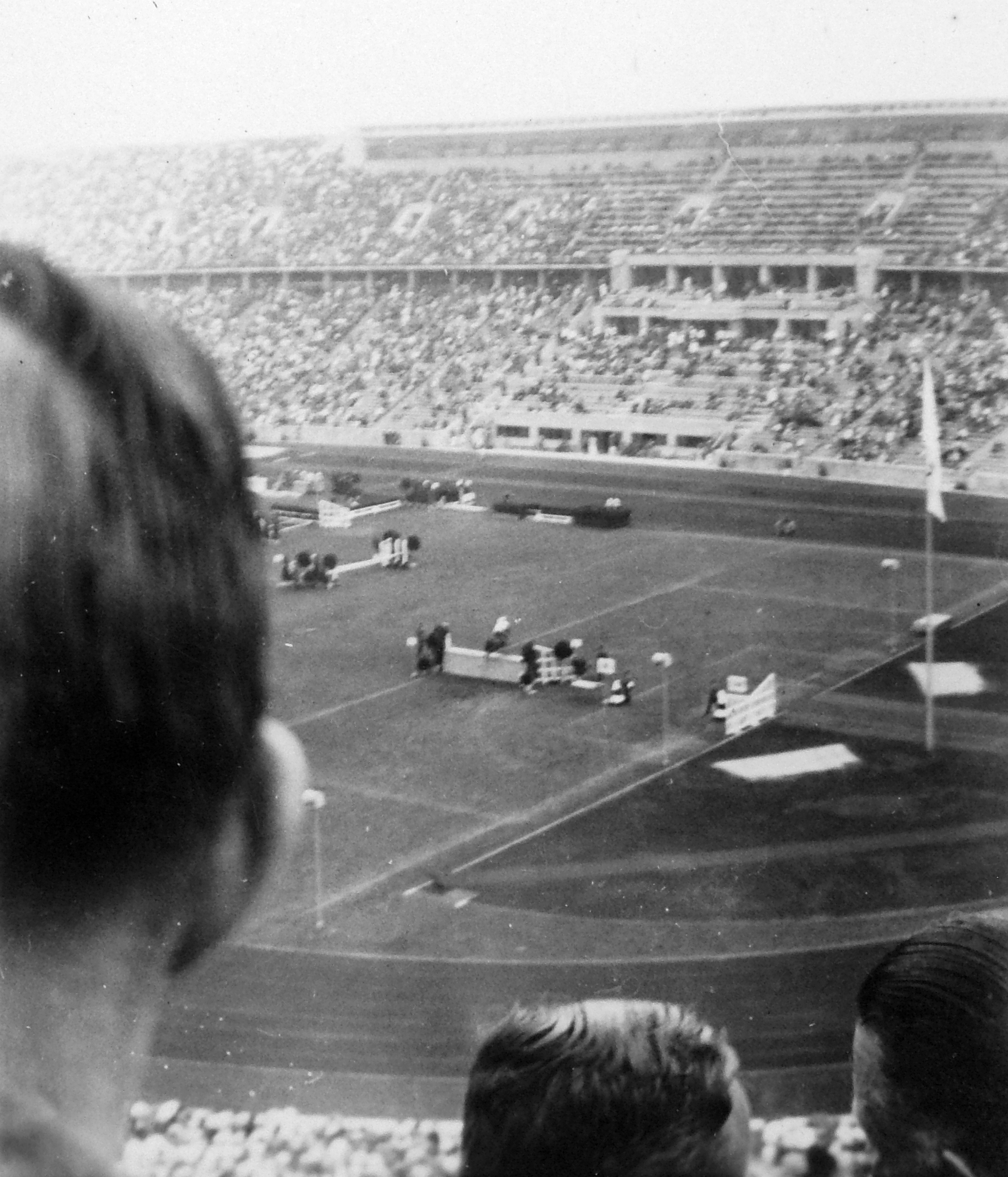
- Jumping competition
- Venue: Olympiastadion
- Date: 16 August 1936
- Competitors: 54 from 18 nations
- Winning score: 4.00 faults

Medalists
1st place, gold medalist(s)		Kurt Hasse; Germany
2nd place, silver medalist(s)		Henri Rang; Romania
3rd place, bronze medalist(s)		József von Platthy; Hungary

The individual show jumping in equestrian at the 1936 Olympic Games in Berlin was held at the Olympiastadion (jumping) on 16 August. The competition was also referred to as the "Prix des Nations." There were 54 competitors from 18 nations, with each nation having a team of three riders. The results of the individual event were used for the team jumping event as well. The individual event was won by Kurt Hasse of Germany, the nation's first victory in individual jumping and first medal in the event since 1912. Romania and Hungary each earned their first individual jumping medals, the former with Henri Rang's silver and the latter with József von Platthy's bronze.

== Background ==
This was the seventh appearance of the event, which had first been held at the 1900 Summer Olympics and has been held at every Summer Olympics at which equestrian sports have been featured (that is, excluding 1896, 1904, and 1908). It is the oldest event on the current programme, the only one that was held in 1900.

Three of the 11 riders from the 1932 competition returned: gold medalist Takeichi Nishi of Japan, fourth-place finisher William Bradford of the United States, and non-finisher Arne Francke of Sweden.

Romania and Turkey each made their debut in the event. Belgium, France, and Sweden competed for the sixth time, tied for the most of any nation; Sweden had missed only the inaugural 1900 competition, while Belgium and France missed the individual jumping in 1932.

== Competition format ==
The team and individual jumping competitions used the same scores. A single round of jumping was held.

The jumping test featured 20 obstacles and had a time limit of 160 seconds. Points were lost for faults (including elimination for the third refusal on the course) and for exceeding the time limit. The schedule of faults was:

- 3 points: first disobedience
- 4 points: upsetting obstacle, touching water
- 6 points: second disobedience, fall of horse
- 10 points: fall of rider
- 1/4 point: every second above 160

Ties for medals were determined by jump-off; other ties were not broken. In the jump-off, there was no time limit but instead the time was used as a tie-breaker if pairs had the same number of faults.

== Schedule ==
Date	Time	Round
Sunday, 16 August 1936	15:00	Final

== Results ==
Rank	Rider	Horse	Nation	Penalties			Notes
Rank	Rider	Horse	Nation	Obstacles	Time	Total	Notes
1	Kurt Hasse	Tora	Germany	4.00	0.00	4.00	Gold jump-off
1	Henri Rang	Delfis	Romania	4.00	0.00	4.00	Gold jump-off
3	Georges Ganshof van der Meersch	Ibrahim	Belgium	8.00	0.00	8.00	Bronze jump-off
3	József von Platthy	Sello	Hungary	8.00	0.00	8.00	Bronze jump-off
3	Carl Raguse	Dakota	United States	8.00	0.00	8.00	Bronze jump-off
6	José Beltrão	Biscuit	Portugal	12.00	0.00	12.00	
6	Xavier Bizard	Bagatelle	France	12.00	0.00	12.00	
6	Johan Greter	Ernica	Netherlands	12.00	0.00	12.00	
6	Maurice Gudin de Vallerin	Ecuyère	France	12.00	0.00	12.00	
6	Cevat Kula	Sapkin	Turkey	12.00	0.00	12.00	
11	Jan de Bruine	Trixie	Netherlands	15.00	0.00	15.00	
11	Henry de Menten de Horne	Musaphiki	Belgium	15.00	0.00	15.00	
11	Arnold Mettler	Durmitor	Switzerland	15.00	0.00	15.00	
14	Manabu Iwahashi	Falaise	Japan	12.00	3.25	15.25	
15	Renzo Bonivento	Osoppo	Italy	16.00	2.75	18.75	
16	Marten von Barnekow	Nordland	Germany	20.00	0.00	20.00	
16	Heinz Brandt	Alchimist	Germany	20.00	0.00	20.00	
16	Gerardo Conforti	Saba	Italy	20.00	0.00	20.00	
16	Domingos Coutinho	Merle Blanc	Portugal	20.00	0.00	20.00	
20	Takeichi Nishi	Uranus	Japan	19.00	1.75	20.75	
21	Luís Mena e Silva	Fausette	Portugal	24.00	0.00	24.00	
21	Heinrich Sauer	Gloriette	Austria	24.00	0.00	24.00	
23	Henri van Schaik	Santa Bell	Netherlands	24.00	0.50	24.50	
24	Arthur Qvist	Notatus	Norway	24.00	1.00	25.00	
25	William Bradford	Don	United States	17.00	10.00	27.00	
25	Arne Francke	Urfé	Sweden	27.00	0.00	27.00	
27	Miloslav Buzek	Chroust	Czechoslovakia	28.00	0.00	28.00	
27	Saim Polatkan	Schakal	Turkey	28.00	0.00	28.00	
29	Constantin Apostol	Dracustie	Romania	21.00	7.75	28.75	
30	Jörg Fehr	Corona	Switzerland	25.00	4.00	29.00	
31	Hans Iklé	Exilé	Switzerland	29.00	1.50	30.50	
32	Rolf Örn	Kornett	Sweden	31.00	0.75	31.75	Note 1
33	Ottmár Szepesi	Pókai	Hungary	35.00	0.00	35.00	Note 1
34	Cornelius Jadwin	Ugly	United States	33.00	4.50	37.50	
35	Hirotsugu Inanami	Asafuji	Japan	39.00	0.00	39.00	
36	Janusz Komorowski	Dunkan	Poland	45.00	2.25	47.25	
37	Gerhard Egger	Mimir	Austria	31.00	16.50	47.50	
38	Jean de Tillière	Adriano	France	41.00	10.25	51.25	
–	Elemér von Barcza	Kopé	Hungary	DNF			
–	Prince Gustaf Adolf	Aida	Sweden	DNF			
–	Capel Brunker	Magpie	Great Britain	DNF			
–	Bill Carr	Bovril	Great Britain	DNF			
–	Julius Čoček	Chostra	Czechoslovakia	DNF			
–	Fernando Filipponi	Nasello	Italy	DNF			
–	Cevat Gürkan	Güdük	Turkey	DNF			
–	Michał Gutowski	Warszawianka	Poland	DNF			
–	Halfdan Petterøe	Schamyl	Norway	DNF			
–	Josef Seyfried	Radmila	Czechoslovakia	DNF			
–	Henrik Skougaard	Felicia	Norway	DNF			
–	Tadeusz Sokołowski	Zbieg II	Poland	DNF			
–	Yves Van Strydonk De Burkel	Ramona	Belgium	DNF			
–	Jack Talbot-Ponsonby	Kineton	Great Britain	DNF			
–	Rudolf Trenkwitz	Danubia	Austria	DNF			
–	Toma Tudoran	Hunter	Romania	DNF			

Gold jump-off

Rank	Rider	Horse	Nation	Penalties	Time
1st place, gold medalist(s)	Kurt Hasse	Tora	Germany	4.00	59.2
2nd place, silver medalist(s)	Henri Rang	Delfis	Romania	4.00	1:12.8

Bronze jump-off

Rank	Rider	Horse	Nation	Penalties	Time
3rd place, bronze medalist(s)	József von Platthy	Sello	Hungary	0.00	1:02.6
4	Georges Ganshof van der Meersch	Ibrahim	Belgium	0.00	1:09.0
5	Carl Raguse	Dakota	United States	4.00	1:02.4
