= Equestrian at the 1936 Summer Olympics – Team jumping =

Equestrian at the Olympics

Team jumping at the Games of the XI Olympiad
- Venue: Olympiastadion
- Date: 16 August 1936
- Competitors: 54 from 18 nations

Medalists
1st place, gold medalist(s)		Kurt Hasse; Marten von Barnekow; Heinz Brandt	Germany
2nd place, silver medalist(s)		Johan Greter; Jan de Bruine; Henri van Schaik	Netherlands
3rd place, bronze medalist(s)		José Beltrão; Domingos de Sousa; Luís Mena e Silva	Portugal

The team jumping in equestrian at the 1936 Olympic Games in Berlin was held at the Olympiastadion (jumping) on 16 August. The competition was also referred to as the "Prix des Nations."

== Competition format ==
The team and individual jumping competitions used the same scores.

The jumping test featured 20 obstacles and had a time limit of 160 seconds. Points were lost for faults (including elimination for the third refusal on the course) and for exceeding the time limit. The schedule of faults was:

- 3 points: first disobedience
- 4 points: upsetting obstacle, touching water
- 6 points: second disobedience, fall of horse
- 10 points: fall of rider
- 1/4 point: every second above 160

A team had to have all three pairs finish to be placed.

== Results ==
Rank	Nation	Individual			Team total
Rank	Nation	Rider	Horse	Penalties	Team total
1st place, gold medalist(s)	Germany	Kurt Hasse	Tora	4.00	44.00
1st place, gold medalist(s)	Germany	Marten von Barnekow	Nordland	20.00	44.00
1st place, gold medalist(s)	Germany	Heinz Brandt	Alchimist	20.00	44.00
2nd place, silver medalist(s)	Netherlands	Johan Greter	Ernica	12.00	51.50
2nd place, silver medalist(s)	Netherlands	Jan de Bruine	Trixie	15.00	51.50
2nd place, silver medalist(s)	Netherlands	Henri van Schaik	Santa Bell	24.50	51.50
3rd place, bronze medalist(s)	Portugal	José Beltrão	Biscuit	12.00	56.00
3rd place, bronze medalist(s)	Portugal	Domingos Coutinho	Merle Blanc	20.00	56.00
3rd place, bronze medalist(s)	Portugal	Luís Mena e Silva	Fausette	24.00	56.00
4	United States	Carl Raguse	Dakota	8.00	72.50
4	United States	William Bradford	Don	27.00	72.50
4	United States	Cornelius Jadwin	Ugly	37.50	72.50
5	Switzerland	Arnold Mettler	Durmitor	15.00	74.50
5	Switzerland	Jörg Fehr	Corona	29.00	74.50
5	Switzerland	Hans Iklé	Exilé	30.50	74.50
6	Japan	Manabu Iwahashi	Falaise	15.25	75.00
6	Japan	Takeichi Nishi	Uranus	20.75	75.00
6	Japan	Hirotsugu Inanami	Asafuji	39.00	75.00
7	France	Xavier Bizard	Bagatelle	12.00	75.25
7	France	Maurice Gudin de Vallerin	Ecuyère	12.00	75.25
7	France	Jean de Tillière	Adriano	51.25	75.25
–	Austria	Heinrich Sauer	Gloriette	24.00	DQ
–	Austria	Gerhard Egger	Mimir	47.50	DQ
–	Austria	Rudolf Trenkwitz	Danubia	DNF	DQ
–	Belgium	Georges Ganshof van der Meersch	Ibrahim	8.00	DQ
–	Belgium	Henry de Menten de Horne	Musaphiki	15.00	DQ
–	Belgium	Yves Van Strydonk De Burkel	Ramona	DNF	DQ
–	Czechoslovakia	Miloslav Buzek	Chroust	28.00	DQ
–	Czechoslovakia	Julius Čoček	Chostra	DNF	DQ
–	Czechoslovakia	Josef Seyfried	Radmila	DNF	DQ
–	Great Britain	Capel Brunker	Magpie	DNF	DQ
–	Great Britain	Bill Carr	Bovril	DNF	DQ
–	Great Britain	Jack Talbot-Ponsonby	Kineton	DNF	DQ
–	Hungary	József von Platthy	Sello	8.00	DQ
–	Hungary	Ottmar Szepesi	Pókai	35.00	DQ
–	Hungary	Elemér von Barcza	Kopé	DNF	DQ
–	Italy	Renzo Bonivento	Osoppo	18.75	DQ
–	Italy	Gerardo Conforti	Saba	20.00	DQ
–	Italy	Fernando Filipponi	Nasello	DNF	DQ
–	Norway	Arthur Qvist	Notatus	25.00	DQ
–	Norway	Halfdan Petterøe	Schamyl	DNF	DQ
–	Norway	Henrik Skougaard	Felicia	DNF	DQ
–	Poland	Janusz Komorowski	Dunkan	47.25	DQ
–	Poland	Michał Gutowski	Warszawianka	DNF	DQ
–	Poland	Tadeusz Sokołowski	Zbieg II	DNF	DQ
–	Romania	Henri Rang	Delfis	4.00	DQ
–	Romania	Constantin Apostol	Dracustie	28.75	DQ
–	Romania	Toma Tudoran	Hunter	DNF	DQ
–	Sweden	Arne Francke	Urfé	27.00	DQ
–	Sweden	Rolf Örn	Kornett	31.75	DQ
–	Sweden	Prince Gustaf Adolf	Aida	DNF	DQ
–	Turkey	Cevat Kula	Sapkin	12.00	DQ
–	Turkey	Saim Polatkan	Schakal	28.00	DQ
–	Turkey	Cevat Gürkan	Güdük	DNF	DQ
