= Deaths in December 1990 =

The following is a list of notable deaths in December 1990.

Entries for each day are listed alphabetically by surname. A typical entry lists information in the following sequence:

- Name, age, country of citizenship at birth, subsequent country of citizenship (if applicable), reason for notability, cause of death (if known), and reference.

== December 1990 ==
=== 1 ===
- Raymond Clark, 66, American Olympic canoeist (1948).
- Sergio Corbucci, 63, Italian film director and screenwriter, heart attack.
- Simone Melchior Cousteau, 71, French aquanaut, cancer.
- Pierre Dux, 82, French actor.
- Robert Gordon, 77, American director and actor.
- Erich Hüttenhain, 85, German academic mathematician and cryptographer.
- Anton Kochinyan, 77, Soviet Armenian politician.
- Carla Lehmann, 73, Canadian actress.
- Vito Miceli, 74, Italian politician and general.
- David A. Morse, 83, American labor bureaucrat.
- Vijaya Lakshmi Pandit, 90, Indian diplomat and politician.
- Octavio Beras Rojas, 84, Dominican Roman Catholic cardinal.

=== 2 ===
- Richard Benner, 46-47, American film director and screenwriter, AIDS.
- John Britton, 71, American baseball player.
- Marc Cerboni, 35, French Olympic fencer (1984).
- Aaron Copland, 90, American composer and conductor, Alzheimer's disease.
- Robert Cummings, 80, American actor, kidney failure and complications from pneumonia.
- Paul Hoffmann, 88, German actor.
- Edward Oldfield, 70, Australian politician.
- Paddy Smith, 96, American baseball player (Boston Red Sox).
- Clint Thomas, 94, American baseball player.
- Georg Wildhagen, 70, German filmmaker.

=== 3 ===
- Tim Dlugos, 40, American poet, AIDS.
- Gerry Doyle, 79, Irish footballer.
- Rolf Hansen, 85, German film director.
- Heino Mandri, 68, Estonian film and stage actor.
- Ray Wagner, 88, American gridiron football player.

=== 4 ===
- Edward Binns, 74, American actor (12 Angry Men, North by Northwest, Judgment at Nuremberg), heart attack.
- Jack J. Catton, 70, American Air Force general.
- Charles B. MacDonald, 68, American army historian, cancer.
- Nelson Peterson, 77, American football player (Cleveland Rams, Washington Redskins).
- Naoto Tajima, 78, Japanese athlete and Olympic champion (1932, 1936).
- Kimio Yada, 77, Japanese Olympic track and field athlete (1936).

=== 5 ===
- Peter Blum, 65, South African poet.
- Robert Chesley, 47, American playwright, AIDS.
- Kai Curry-Lindahl, 73, Swedish zoologist.
- Lucy Dawidowicz, 75, American historian.
- Narayan Gopal, 51, Nepali singer, diabetes.
- Josef Jedlička, 63, Czechoslovak writer.
- Ott-Heinrich Keller, 84, German mathematician.
- Alfonso A. Ossorio, 74, Filipino-American artist.
- Jack Pleis, 73, American jazz musician.
- Howard Allen Schneiderman, 63, American entomologist.
- Karl Seitz, 86, Austrian Olympic water polo player (1936).
- Steve Shaw, 25, American actor, traffic collision.

=== 6 ===
- Ed Bell, 69, American football player (Green Bay Packers).
- Natan Brand, 46, Israeli classical pianist, lymphoma.
- Victor Groom, 92, British RAF officer and WWI flying ace.
- Bob Hamilton, 74, American golfer.
- Bill Hardman, 57, American trumpeter, intracerebral hemorrhage.
- George Healis, 84, American Olympic rower (1928).
- Otto Hitzfeld, 92, German general.
- F. Jay Nimtz, 75, American politician, member of the U.S. House of Representatives (1957–1959).
- Remi Prudhomme, 48, American football player (Buffalo Bills, Kansas City Chiefs, New Orleans Saints).
- Polingaysi Qöyawayma, 98, American Hopi educator.
- Tunku Abdul Rahman, 87, Malaysian politician, prime minister (1957–1970). .
- Pavlos Sidiropoulos, 42, Greek rock singer, songwriter and guitarist, heroin overdose.

=== 7 ===
- Joan Bennett, 80, American actress, heart failure.
- Horst Bienek, 60, German novelist, AIDS.
- Norman Bower, 83, British politician.
- Dee Clark, 52, American soul singer, heart attack.
- Jean Duceppe, 67, Stage and television actor from Montreal, Quebec.
- Lew Flick, 75, American baseball player (Philadelphia Athletics).
- Reinaldo Arenas Fuentes, 47, Cuban novelist, playwright and poet, suicide.
- Pierre Henri Landry, 92, Russian-French tennis player.
- Luis Frangella, 46, Argentine-American artist, AIDS.
- Jean Paul Lemieux, 86, Canadian painter.
- Ralph McKinzie, 96, American sports coach.
- Frederick Melland, 86, British lacrosse and Olympic ice hockey player (1928).
- Peter Mieg, 84, Swiss composer.
- Oscar Millard, 82, English screenwriter.
- Rinaldo Ossola, 77, Italian politician.
- David Richmond, 49, American civil rights activist, lung cancer.
- Cleto Rodríguez, 67, American soldier, Medal of Honor recipient.
- Dario Salata, 77, Italian Olympic sailor (1948, 1952).
- Vilmos Énekes, 75, Hungarian boxer.

=== 8 ===
- John Alexander, 67, American opera singer, heart attack.
- Deane C. Davis, 90, American politician, governor of Vermont (1969–1973).
- Ed Edmondson, 71, American politician, member of the U.S. House of Representatives (1953–1973).
- Tadeusz Kantor, 75, Polish painter and theatre director.
- Boris Kochno, 86, Russian dancer, librettist and poet, accidental fall.
- Lana Marconi, 73, Romanian-French actress.
- Forrest S. Petersen, 68, American pilot, brain cancer.
- Martin Ritt, 76, American film director (Hud, Norma Rae, Sounder), heart disease.
- Wendell Rollins, 73, American Olympic cyclist (1948).
- William Atcheson Stewart, 75, Canadian politician.

=== 9 ===
- Ben Duijker, 87, Dutch Olympic cyclist (1928).
- Henry Hicks, 75, Canadian politician, traffic collision.
- Mike Mazurki, 82, American actor and professional wrestler.
- Ella Molnár, 84, Hungarian Olympic swimmer (1924).
- Nirala, 53, Pakistani comedian and actor.
- Arthur O'Bryan, 67, Australian rules footballer.

=== 10 ===
- Yves Devernay, 53, French organist and composer, heart attack.
- Armand Hammer, 92, American industrialist and philanthropist, bone marrow cancer.
- Carl Jamissen, 80, Norwegian footballer.
- Dorothea Kent, 74, American actress, breast cancer.
- Marino Morettini, 59, Italian Olympic cyclist (1952).
- Doyle Nave, 75, American football player.
- Cec Ruddell, 73, Australian rules footballer.
- Bert Weeks, 73, Canadian politician.

=== 11 ===
- Lloyd Gross, 85, Canadian ice hockey player.
- Drago Jelić, 76, Yugoslavian Olympic gymnast (1948).
- Arthur Kornhauser, 94, American industrial psychologist, stroke.
- Peter Millman, 84, Canadian astronomer.
- Robert Noble, 80, Canadian physician.
- Wynn Pearce, 62, American television actor (Outlaws).
- David Turner, 63, British playwright.

=== 12 ===
- Giorgio Ghezzi, 60, Italian footballer, heart attack.
- Jack Harley, 79, British botanist.
- Concha Piquer, 83, Spanish actress and singer, heart attack.
- Ian Trethowan, 68, British journalist and broadcaster, ALS.

=== 13 ===
- Buddy Justus, 37, American convicted spree killer, execution by electric chair.
- Edwin Lester, 95, American theatre director.
- Marta Linden, 87, American actress.
- Alice Marble, 77, American tennis player and Grand Slam winner, pernicious anemia.
- Alfred Dennis Sieminski, 79, American politician, member of the U.S. House of Representatives (1951–1959), heart attack.
- Jaroslav Volf, 57, Czechoslovak Olympic ice hockey player (1960).
- Archie Ware, 72, American baseball player.

=== 14 ===
- Friedrich Dürrenmatt, 69, Swiss crime novelist, dramatist and satirist, heart failure.
- Nan Wood Graham, 91, American artist, model for American Gothic.
- Red Heron, 72, Canadian ice hockey player.
- Gunild Keetman, 86, German musicologist.
- Zhang Qun, 101, Taiwanese politician, premier (1947–1948).
- Francisco Gabilondo Soler, 83, Mexican composer.
- Johannes, 11th Prince of Thurn and Taxis, 64, German businessman and noble, complications from heart surgery.
- Pietro Tordi, 84, Italian actor.

=== 15 ===
- Julio Gutiérrez, 72, Cuban musician.
- Mikayil Jabrayilov, 38, Soviet Azerbaijani soldier, killed in battle.
- John Keefer Mahony, 79, Canadian WWII VC recipient.
- Bill Otis, 100, American baseball player (New York Highlanders).
- Jean Paige, 95, American silent film actress.
- Ed Parker, 59, American martial artist, heart attack.
- Frederic Seebohm, Baron Seebohm, 81, British banker, traffic collision.
- Tamao Shiwaku, 84, Japanese Olympic runner (1936).
- Chen Zhifang, 83-84, Chinese diplomat.

=== 16 ===
- Marc Augier, 82, French far-right writer.
- Douglas Campbell, 94, American aviator and flying ace during World War I.
- Wally Flager, 69, American baseball player (Cincinnati Reds, Philadelphia Phillies).
- Don Hooper, 76, Australian rules footballer.
- Art Koeninger, 84, American football player (Philadelphia Eagles).
- Jackie Mittoo, 42, Jamaican-Canadian musician, cancer.

=== 17 ===
- Olivia Bonelli, 70, American operatic soprano
- William Cobb, 72-73, American roller coaster designer.
- John Grover, 75, English cricket player.
- Frank Hutchison, 93, New Zealand cricket player.
- Eurialo De Michelis, 86, Italian writer.
- Ludwig Lachmann, 84, German economist.
- Guy Lafarge, 86, French composer of operettas and popular songs.

=== 18 ===
- Bernard Addison, 85, American guitarist.
- Keith Benson, 73, Australian rugby league player.
- Arthur Roy Clapham, 86, British botanist.
- Charlie Gibson, 91, American baseball player (Philadelphia Athletics).
- Geoffrey Giles, 67, Australian politician.
- Tadahiko Hayashi, 72, Japanese photographer, liver cancer.
- Orazio Orlando, 57, Italian actor, heart attack.
- Anne Revere, 87, American actress, pneumonia.
- Connie Russell, 67, American singer and actress (Red Hot Riding Hood), in 1947, she became a network staff singer on NBC, joining Manor House Summer Party for an eight-week stint as the program's featured singer, she also had success on Eddie Cantor's television program when he liked her so well in a guest appearance that he signed her to a contract.
- Greta Stevenson, 79, New Zealand mycologist.
- Paul Tortelier, 76, French cellist.
- Hazel Walker, 76, American amateur basketball player.

=== 19 ===
- Rubem Braga, 77, Brazilian writer.
- Edmond Delfour, 83, French footballer.
- Norbert Dufourcq, 86, French musicologist.
- Basil Henson, 72, English actor.
- Michael Oakeshott, 89, English philosopher.
- Count Oluf of Rosenborg, 67, Danish noble.
- Billy Tidwell, 60, American football player (San Francisco 49ers).

=== 20 ===
- Edward J. Bonin, 85, American politician, member of the U.S. House of Representatives (1953–1955).
- Marc Chirik, 83, Russian-French communist revolutionary.
- Valeriu Călinoiu, 62, Romanian Olympic footballer (1952).
- Andrea Dunbar, 29, English playwright, intracerebral hemorrhage.
- John Hewetson, 77, British newspaper editor.
- Saul Mariaschin, 66, American basketball player (Boston Celtics).
- Lauro Mumar, 66, Filipino basketball player and Olympian (1948).
- Mahmudun Nabi, 54, Bangladeshi singer.
- Karl Rolvaag, 77, American politician and diplomat, governor of Minnesota (1963–1967).
- Gershom Schocken, 78, Israeli politician and journalist, liver cancer.
- Elmo Tanner, 86, American singer and whistler.
- Bernie Waldron, 70, Australian rules footballer.

=== 21 ===
- Sigurd Anderson, 86, Norwegian-American politician, governor of South Dakota (1951–1955).
- Medard Boss, 87, Swiss psychiatrist.
- Yi Geon, 81, Korean prince and Imperial Japanese Army officer during World War II.
- Kelly Johnson, 80, American aeronautical engineer.
- Magda Julin, 96, Swedish figure skater, Olympic champion (1920).
- Ivan Knunyants, 84, Soviet chemist.
- Surendra Mohanty, 68, Indian author and politician.
- József von Platthy, 90, Hungarian Olympic equestrian (1936).
- Valmari Toikka, 87, Finnish Olympic cross-country skier (1932).
- Fred Washington, 23, American football player (Chicago Bears), traffic collision.

=== 22 ===
- Cecil Effinger, 76, American composer.
- Robin Friday, 38, English footballer, heart attack.
- Ward Hawkins, 77, American author.
- Ken Irvine, 50, Australian rugby player, leukaemia.
- Henning Sundesson, 81, Swedish Olympic long distance runner (1936).
- Lawrence Watson, 73, Canadian politician, member of the House of Commons of Canada (1963-1968).

=== 23 ===
- Ladislau Brosovszky, 39, Romanian footballer.
- Pierre Chenal, 86, French filmmaker.
- Serge Danot, 59, French animator.
- József Darányi, 85, Hungarian Olympic shot putter (1928, 1932, 1936).
- Lindsay Fricker, 85, Australian rules footballer.
- Pierre Gripari, 65, French writer, complications from surgery.
- Richard Irving, 73, American actor, director and producer.
- Frank King, 64, Barbadian cricketer.
- Foy D. Kohler, 82, American diplomat.
- Herbert Salzman, 74, American businessman and Economics consultant.
- Wendell Scott, 69, American stock car racing driver, spinal cancer.
- Wilmar H. Shiras, 82, American science fiction author.

=== 24 ===
- Thorbjørn Egner, 78, Norwegian children's writer, playwright and songwriter, heart attack.
- Judith Ledeboer, 89, Dutch-English architect.
- Friedrich Luft, 79, German theatre critic.
- Keith McDonald, 61, Australian rules footballer.
- Rodolfo Orlandini, 85, Argentine footballer and Olympian (1928).
- Irvin Stewart, 91, American communications administrator.
- Gwyn Williams, 86, Welsh writer.

=== 25 ===
- John Stuart Anderson, 82, British-Australian chemist, cancer.
- Vladimir Belousov, 83, Soviet geologist.
- Aleksandr Luchinskiy, 90, Soviet general.
- Warwick Snedden, 70, New Zealand cricketer.
- Nicolaas Tates, 75, Dutch Olympic canoeist (1936).
- Dodo Watts, 79, British stage and film actress.

=== 26 ===
- Nicholas André, 56, South African Olympic boxer (1956).
- Jack Beattie, 83, British-Canadian ice hockey player (Boston Bruins, Detroit Red Wings, New York Americans).
- Gene Callahan, 67, American set and production designer and art director, heart attack.
- G. Elliott Hagan, 74, American politician, member of the U.S. House of Representatives (1961–1973).
- Portland Hoffa, 85, American comedian, radio host, actress, and dancer.
- Eddie Kimball, 87, American football player.

=== 27 ===
- Abulfat Aliyev, 63, Soviet and Azerbaijani opera singer.
- Hendrika Gerritsen, 69, Dutch resistance member during World War II.
- Frank Kennedy, 70, Australian rules footballer.
- Concha Michel, 91, Mexican singer-songwriter, political activist, and playwright.
- Hubert Persson, 72, Swedish Olympic wrestler (1952).
- Helene Stanley, 61, American actress.
- Harold Town, 66, Canadian painter.
- Chang Ucchin, 73, South Korean artist.
- Kurt Wahl, 78, German Olympic fencer (1952).

=== 28 ===
- Edward Brayshaw, 57, Australian actor, throat cancer.
- Shirley Crites, 56, American baseball player.
- Ed van der Elsken, 65, Dutch photographer, prostate cancer.
- Dario Graffi, 85, Italian mathematical physicist.
- Seiji Hisamatsu, 78, Japanese film director.
- Gilbert W. Lindsay, 90, American politician.
- Kiel Martin, 46, American actor, lung cancer.
- Arne Petersen, 77, Danish Olympic cyclist (1936).
- Warren Skaaren, 44, American screenwriter (Batman, Beetlejuice, Beverly Hills Cop II), bone cancer.

=== 29 ===
- Giulio Bedeschi, 75, Italian writer and Army officer during World War II.
- Goree Carter, 59, American singer, guitarist, drummer, and songwriter.
- Mona Dol, 89, French actress.
- Aleardo Donati, 86, Italian Olympic wrestler (1924, 1928, 1932, 1936.
- Emmanuel Goldsmith, 81, Swiss Olympic sprinter (1928).
- Jack Nix, 73, American football player (Cleveland Rams).
- Sir David Piper, 72, British author and museum curator.
- Aulikki Rautawaara, 84, Finnish soprano.
- Géza Tóth, 83, Hungarian Olympic gymnast (1928).
- Frederick Wolters, 86, American Olympic field hockey player (1932).

=== 30 ===
- Tony Abruzzo, 74, American comic book artist.
- Fergal Caraher, 20, Northern-Irish Provisional IRA volunteer, shot.
- Jill Cruwys, 47, English cricket player.
- Oliver Daniel, 79, American musicologist.
- Géza Füster, 80, Hungarian-Canadian chess player.
- Albert Mertz, 70, Danish painter.
- Roger Rérolle, 81, French Olympic long-distance runner (1936).
- Nino Rovelli, 73, Italian Olympic bobsledder (1948).
- Raghuvir Sahay, 61, Indian writer.

=== 31 ===
- Elsie Allen, 91, American Pomo basket weaver.
- George Allen, 72, American football coach, ventricular fibrillation.
- Ed Gantner, 31, American professional wrestler, suicide by gunshot.
- Bing Juckes, 64, Canadian ice hockey player (New York Rangers).
- Donald Kingaby, 70, English-American flying ace during World War II.
- Vasily Lazarev, 62, Soviet cosmonaut.
- Giovanni Michelucci, 99, Italian architect, urban planner and designer.
- Amédée Piguet, 86, Swiss Olympic wrestler (1928).
- Moni Singh, 89, Bangladeshi politician.
- Ernst von Siemens, 87, German business magnate.
