= Cevat =

Given name

Cevat is a given name. Notable people with the name include:

- Cevat Rıfat Atilhan (1892–1967), Turkish career officer, antisemitic writer, initiator of the 1934 Thrace pogroms
- Cevat Çobanlı (1870–1938), military commander of the Ottoman Army, War Minister of the Ottoman Empire
- Cevat Güler (born 1959), Turkish former football player and coach
- Cevat Abbas Gürer (1887–1943), officer of the Ottoman Army, the Turkish Army, politician of the Republic of Turkey
- Cevat Gürkan (1907–1984), Turkish equestrian
- Cevat Şakir Kabaağaçlı (1886–1973), Cretan Turk writer of novels, short-stories and essays
- Cevat Kula (1902–1977), Turkish equestrian
- Ahmed Cevat Pasha (1851–1900), Ottoman career officer and statesman
- Cevat Prekazi (born 1957), Yugoslav-Turkish former footballer
- Cevat Seyit (1906–1945), Turkish footballer
- Leman Cevat Tomsu (1913–1988), Turkish architect
- Refi Cevat Ulunay (1890–1968), Syrian-Turkish writer, controversial journalist and novelist during the Ottoman era
- Cevat Yerli (born 1978), German computer game developer of Turkish descent
- Cevat Yurdakul (1942–1979), prosecutor and the chief of police of Adana Province, Turkey, assassinated in 1979
