= Szepesi =

Szepesi is a Hungarian surname. Notable people with the surname include:

- Ádám Szepesi, Hungarian high jumper
- Gusztáv Szepesi, Hungarian football defender
- György Szepesi-Friedländer, Hungarian radio personality and sports executive
- István Szepesi
- Ivett Szepesi
- Kálmán Szepesi
- Nikolett Szepesi, Hungarian swimmer
- Ottmár Szepesi
