= Montherlant =

Montherlant may refer to:

- Henry de Montherlant, (1895–1972), French writer and dramatist
- Montherlant, Oise, a place in France
