= Paul Hamot =

French flying ace

- Born: 30 September 1891; Montherlant, France
- Died: October 18, 1956 (aged 65); Cannes, France
- Military career
- Allegiance: France
- Branch: Flying service
- Rank: Adjutant
- Unit: Escadrille Spa49
- Awards: Légion d'honneur Médaille militaire Croix de Guerre

Adjutant Paul Hamot was a French World War I flying ace credited with five aerial victories.

== Biography ==
See also Aerial victory standards of World War I

Paul Hamot was born in Montherlant, France, on 30 September 1891. His initial military service was with an artillery regiment. He was severely wounded in action. Upon recovery, he was selected for pilot training in January 1916. On 16 June, he received his Military Pilot's Brevet, No. 3686, upon graduating training. He joined Escadrille Spa49 on 16 October 1917.

Hamot teamed with Jean Bouyer to shoot down four German airplanes—a German scout on 18 May 1918, a two-seater on 8 July, and a pair of Albatroses on the 19th. On 1 August 1918, Hamot was promoted to Adjutant. Alexandre Bretillon joined Hamot and Bouyer in shooting down a two-seater on 21 October 1918 for Hamot's fifth victory.

Paul Hamot earned the Legion d'honneur, Médaille Militaire , and the Croix de Guerre with a minimum of three palms.

Paul Hamot died in Cannes, France, on 18 October 1956.
