= Battle of La Horgne =

1940 battle during the German invasion of France

- Part of the Battle of France during the Second World War
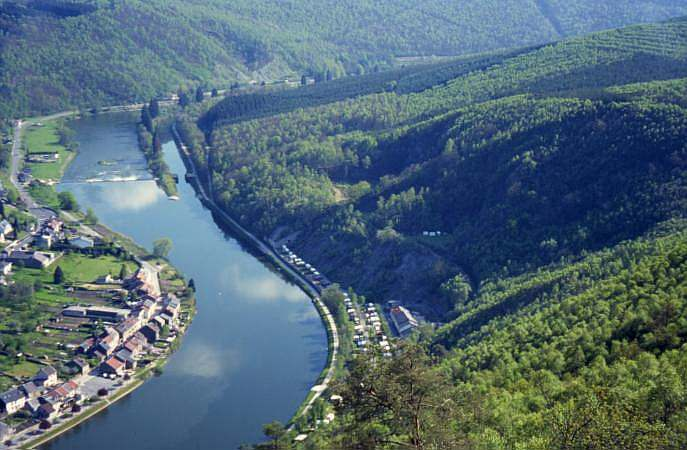
- View of the Meuse.
Date	15 May 1940
Location	La Horgne, France
Result	German victory

Belligerents
France	Germany

Commanders and leaders
(French Third Republic) Colonel Olivier Marc	(Nazi Germany) Colonel Walter Krüger

Units involved
(French Third Republic) 3rd Spahi Brigade	(Nazi Germany) 1st Panzer Division

Casualties and losses
50 killed about 150 wounded 86 prisoners	31 killed 102 wounded about 10 armoured vehicles knocked out

The Battle of La Horgne was fought on 15 May 1940 during the Battle of France in the Second World War. It took place in and around the village of La Horgne in the Ardennes department of northern France.

During the engagement, the French 3rd Spahi Brigade resisted an attack by German motorised infantry and tanks belonging to the 1st Panzer Division. Although the Germans eventually captured the village, the French defence delayed their advance and caused significant losses.

== Background ==
During the German offensive of May 1940, the French 3rd Spahi Brigade was forced to withdraw from the Belgian front. From Wellin and Saint-Hubert, the brigade attempted to slow the German advance.

On 13 May 1940, General Heinz Guderian's XIX Army Corps, after crossing Belgium and Luxembourg, attacked French positions and crossed the Meuse in the Sedan sector. On 14 May, while the 10th Panzer Division attempted an attack south of Sedan, Guderian shifted the axis of advance of the 1st and 2nd Panzer Divisions westwards.

This opened a gap of about 8 km between the French Second Army and Ninth Army, between Poix-Terron and Baâlons. German forces then prepared to advance towards Rethel. On the same day, the 3rd Spahi Brigade was stationed in the area around Poix-Terron.

== Battle ==
During the night of 14–15 May 1940, the 3rd Spahi Brigade, which had already been fighting for five days, was ordered to establish a strongpoint at the crossroads of La Horgne. Its mission was to slow the German advance and allow other French units to move into position in order to seal the breach. The objective was to gain 24 hours for the arrival of the 14th Infantry Division of General Jean de Lattre de Tassigny at Rethel.

Leaving their horses under cover, the spahis of the 2nd Algerian Spahi Regiment and the 2nd Moroccan Spahi Regiment occupied La Horgne. They immediately built barricades and converted buildings into defensive positions. Their anti-tank resources were limited to two 25 mm anti-tank guns and one 37 mm gun.

At about 09:00 on 15 May, a battalion of Schützen-Regiment 1 of the 1st Panzer Division, advancing from Singly, came under heavy fire. The spahis were then attacked by German infantry sections and infantry fighting vehicles, including Sd.Kfz. 251 half-tracks. Later in the afternoon, German tanks joined the attack, including twelve Panzer IIIs and eight Panzer IVs. German Henschel Hs 126 reconnaissance aircraft also observed the sector.

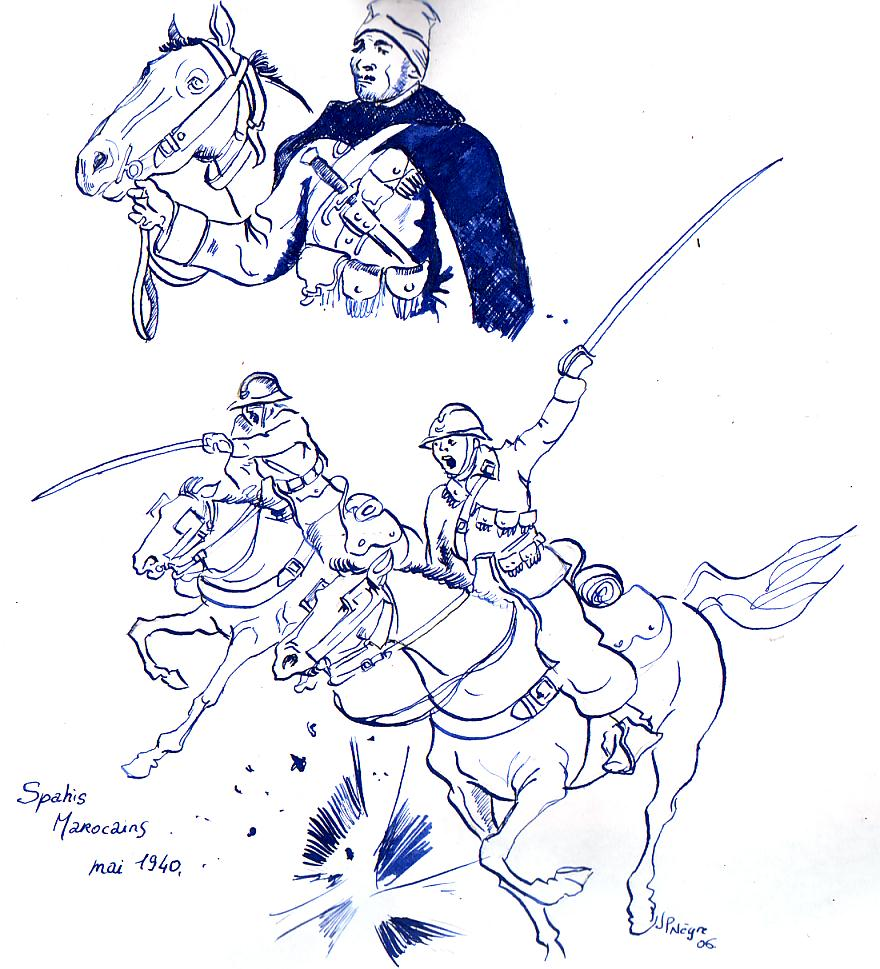
Illustration of Moroccan spahis charging on horseback in May 1940. The later legend of a mounted charge against German tanks at La Horgne is not supported by the historical evidence.

The fighting was intense, but the spahis continued to hold the village despite repeated German attacks. The balance of forces shifted at about 14:30, when the Germans received support from four 105 mm leFH 18 howitzers. Towards the end of the afternoon, two light companies and one medium company of German tanks entered the battle. The German tanks bypassed the French resistance points, and the spahis fired the remainder of their ammunition before withdrawing where possible.

A later legend claimed that the 3rd Squadron of Moroccan Spahis, commanded by Lieutenant Marcel Dugué Mac Carthy, charged German tanks on horseback with drawn sabres. This episode has often been repeated in literature, including by Louis Aragon. In reality, French cavalry in 1940 moved on horseback but fought dismounted. Mac Carthy's squadron counter-attacked on foot late in the day but was pinned down by superior German forces. Wounded by grenade fragments, Lieutenant Mac Carthy was taken prisoner.

Colonel Olivier Marc, commander of the 3rd Spahi Brigade, was wounded and captured. Colonel Emmanuel Burnol, commanding officer of the 2nd Algerian Spahi Regiment, was killed during the breakout attempt when he encountered the protection detachment of the headquarters of Lieutenant-Colonel Hermann Balck, commander of Schützen-Regiment 1. Colonel Émile Geoffroy, commanding officer of the 2nd Moroccan Spahi Regiment, was killed in the village while fighting alongside the last spahis at a barricade.

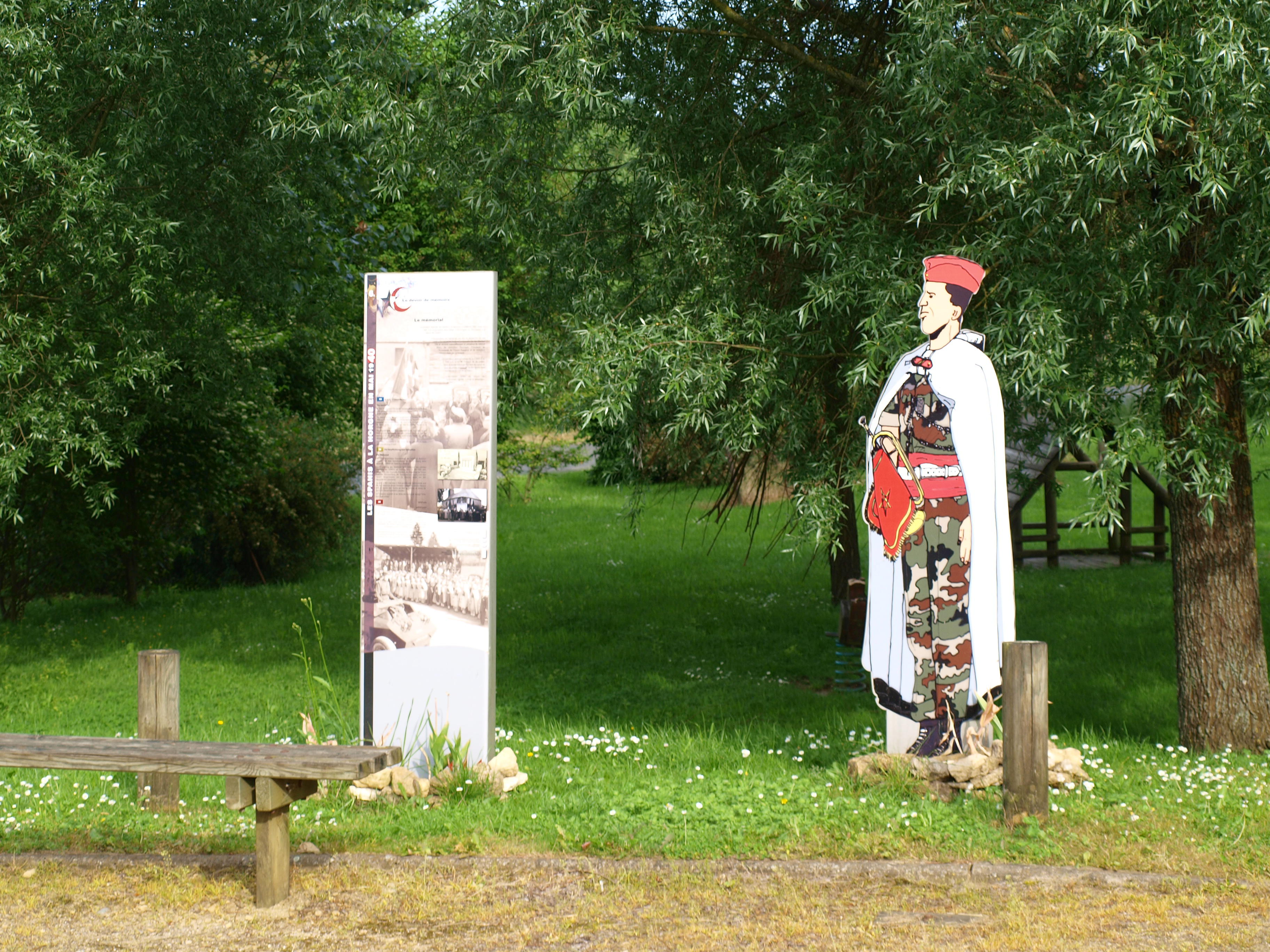

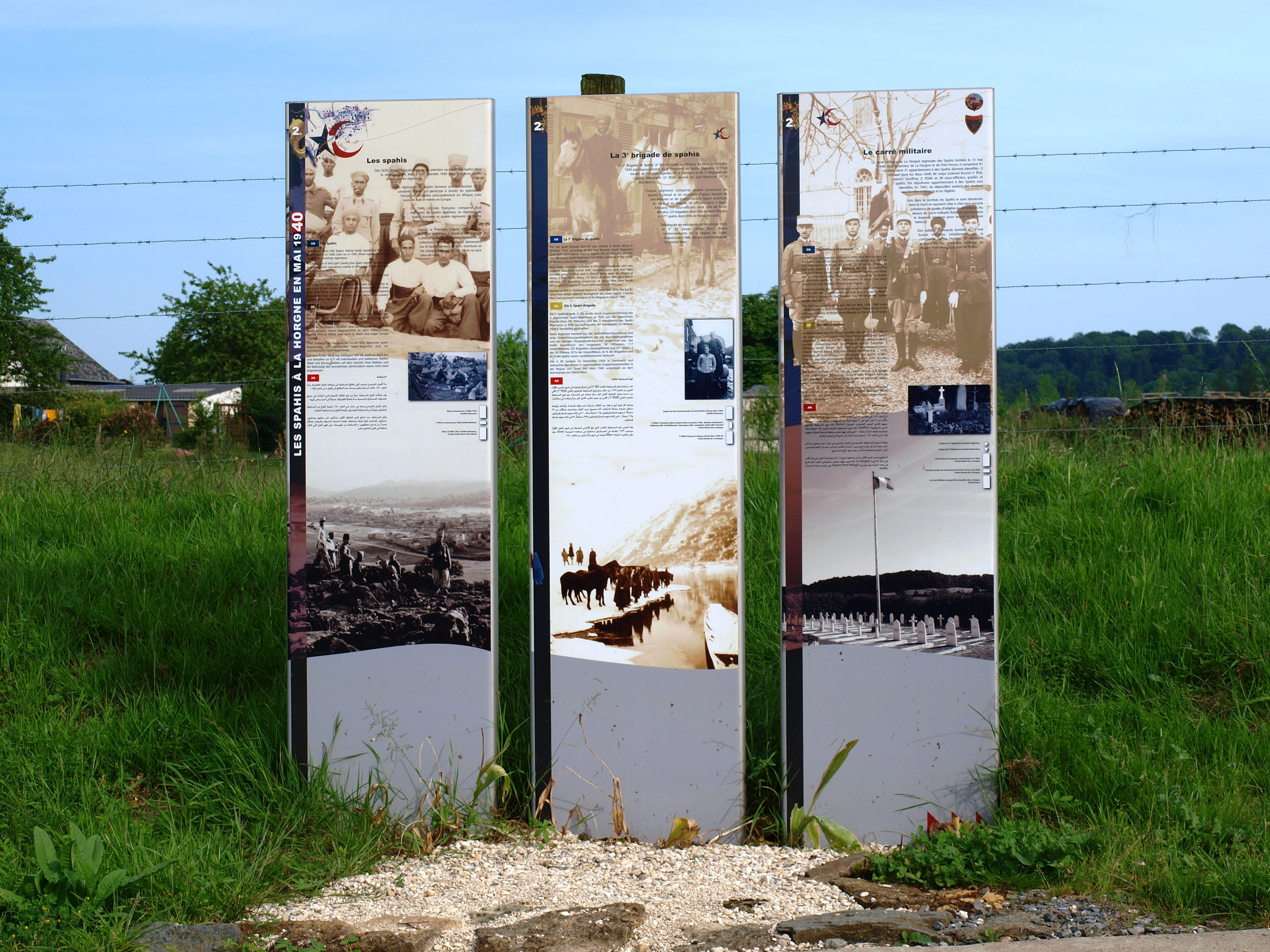

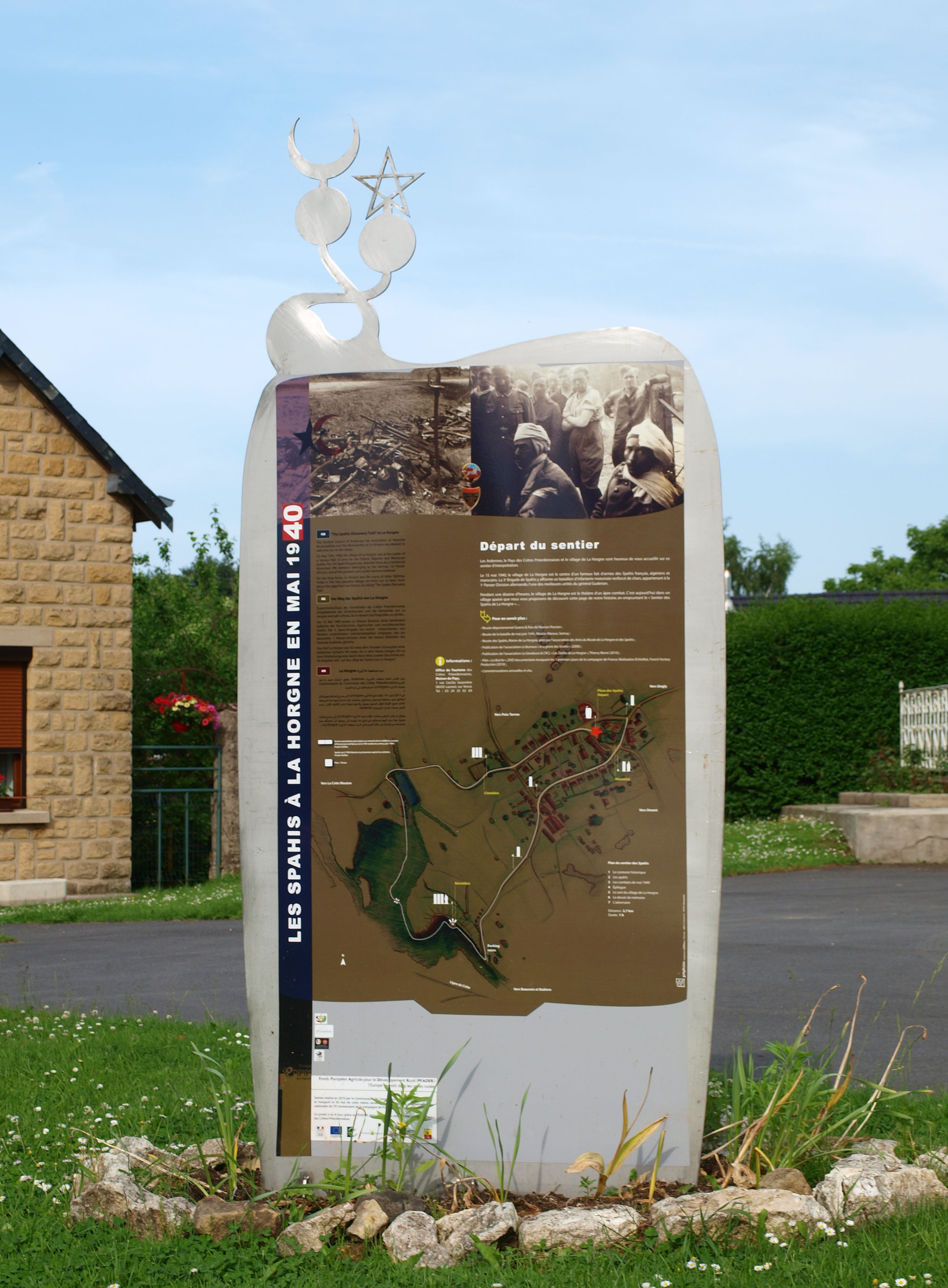

== Aftermath ==
By the evening, after ten hours of fighting, the surviving French defenders were surrounded, exhausted and short of ammunition in a burning village. The expected reinforcements had not arrived. Some spahis managed to withdraw in scattered groups and, in difficult conditions, return to French lines to continue the fight. Others were taken prisoner. According to accounts of the battle, the Germans granted military honours to some of the prisoners on the battlefield.

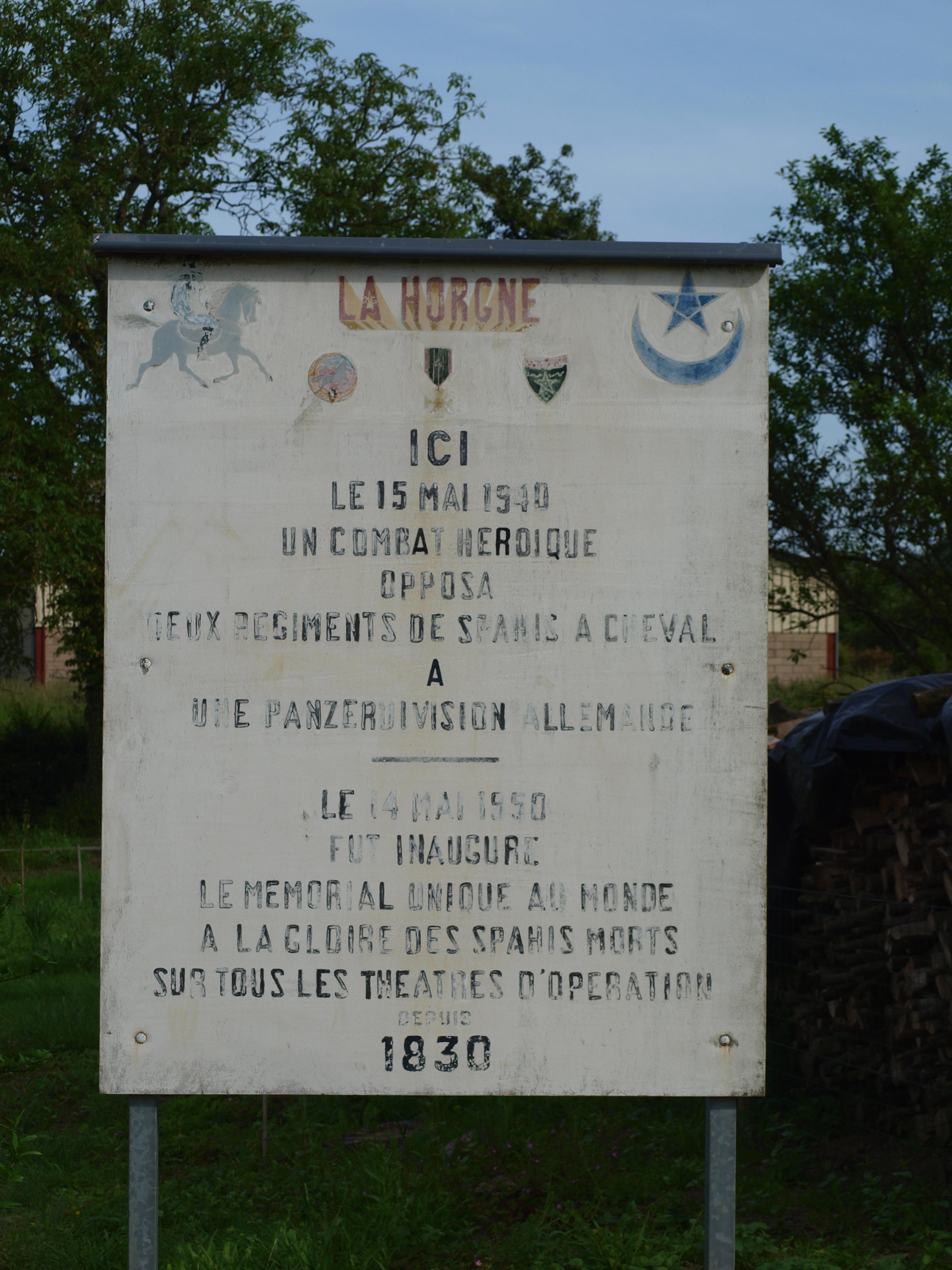
Commemorative plaque at La Horgne.

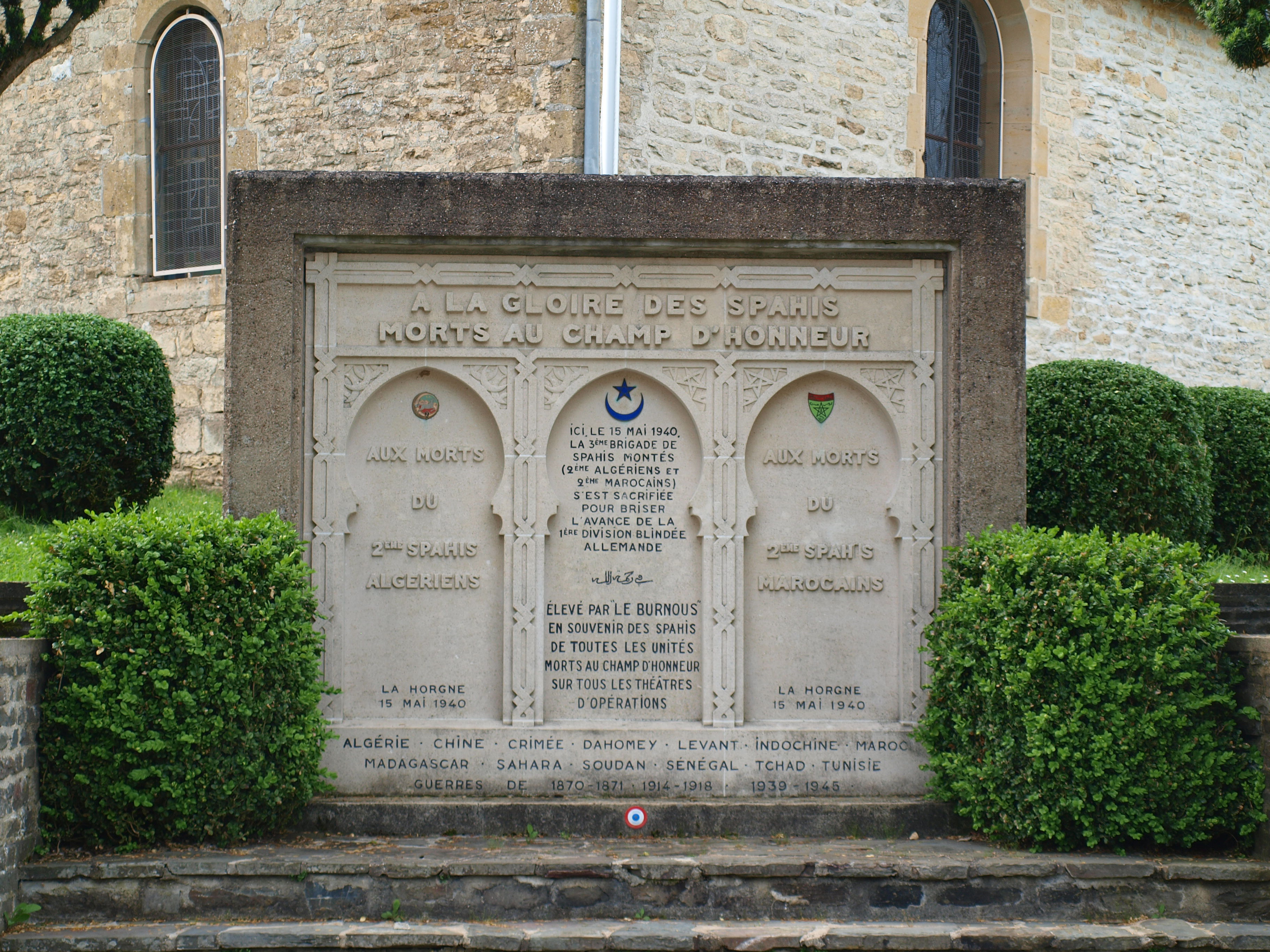
Monument "to the glory of the spahis who died on the field of honour" in front of the church of La Horgne.

== Composition of the 3rd Spahi Brigade in May–June 1940 ==
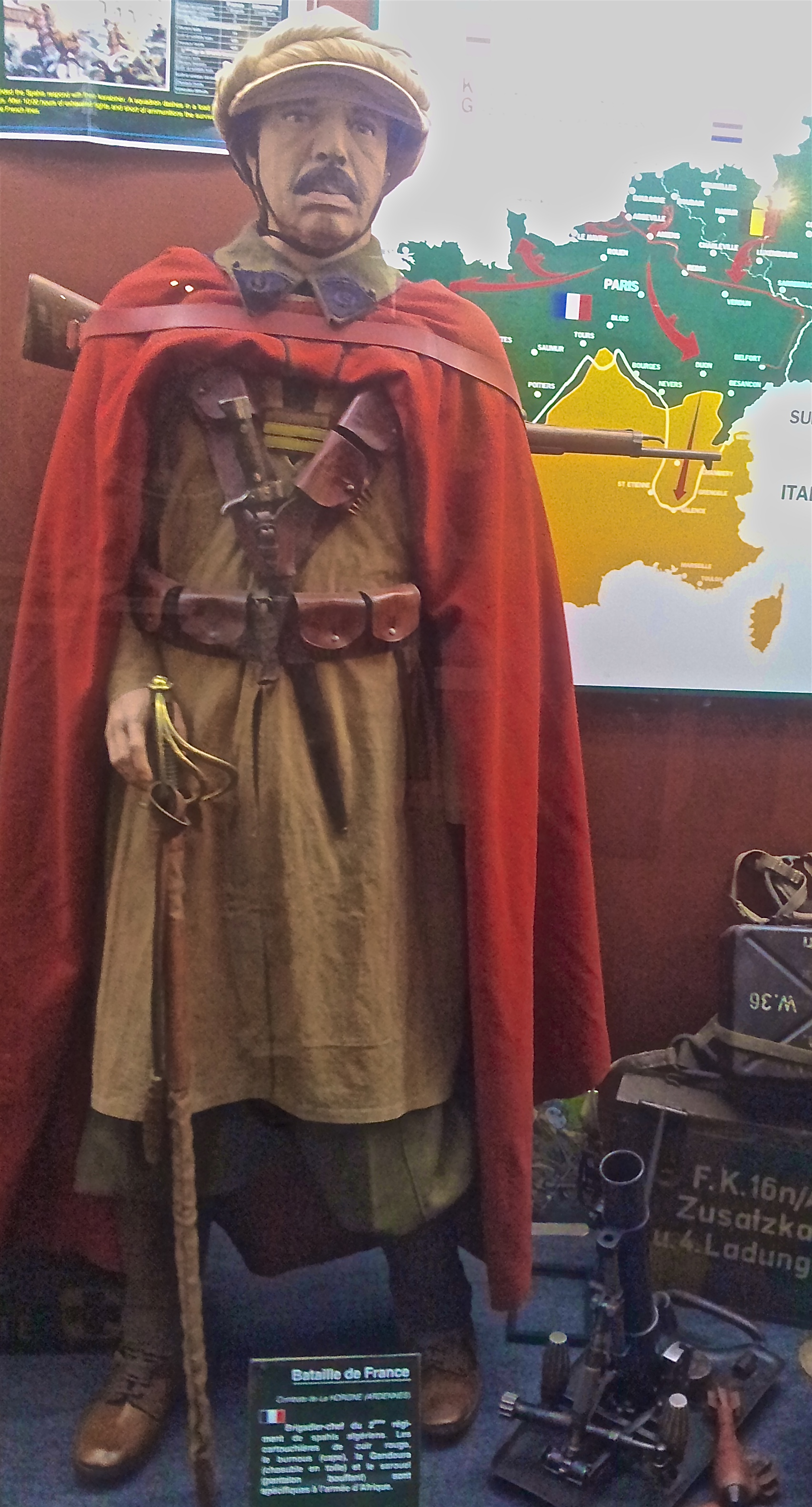
A brigadier-chef of the 2nd Algerian Spahi Regiment during the Battle of La Horgne.

During the Battle of France, three spahi brigades, each with two regiments, were formed. The 1st Brigade comprised the 6th Algerian Spahi Regiment and the 4th Moroccan Spahi Regiment. The 2nd Brigade comprised the 7th and 9th Moroccan Spahi Regiments. The 3rd Brigade comprised the 2nd Algerian Spahi Regiment and the 2nd Moroccan Spahi Regiment.

Each regiment consisted of four mounted spahi squadrons and one support squadron equipped with machine guns and four light anti-tank guns. In theory, a regiment consisted of 25 per cent Europeans and 75 per cent North Africans:

- 39 officers, including 5 North Africans
- 117 non-commissioned officers, 30 per cent of them North Africans
- 125 brigadiers, 50 per cent of them North Africans
- 977 spahis, 85 per cent of them North Africans

== Casualties ==
The memory of the Battle of La Horgne long carried exaggerated figures for French losses, sometimes claiming more than 700 spahis killed.

In 2010, Colonel Thierry Moné, who described the battle as a notable feat of arms for both sides, revised these estimates downwards. In his 2016 doctoral thesis at the Sorbonne, Moné gave more precise figures for the losses suffered on 15 May 1940 at La Horgne and in the immediate area.

According to Moné, the 3rd Spahi Brigade lost exactly 50 killed and about 150 wounded while defending La Horgne for the day. By regiment, the 2nd Algerian Spahi Regiment suffered the heavier losses, with 42 killed, or 84 per cent of the French dead, while the 2nd Moroccan Spahi Regiment lost 8 killed, or 16 per cent. By origin, the French dead consisted of 16 men of French origin, 28 of Algerian origin and 6 of Moroccan origin.

Among those killed were five officers, all of French origin, including the two regimental commanders, Colonel Emmanuel Burnol of the 2nd Algerian Spahi Regiment and Colonel Émile Geoffroy of the 2nd Moroccan Spahi Regiment. Six non-commissioned officers were killed, two of French origin and four of Algerian origin. Thirty-nine brigadiers and spahis were killed, including nine of French origin, twenty-four of Algerian origin and six of Moroccan origin.

The fifty spahis killed at La Horgne and in the surrounding area represented slightly less than 2 per cent of the approximately 2,600 men of the 3rd Spahi Brigade. This contrasts with the later legend of 740 spahis killed, which would have represented more than 28 per cent of the brigade.

The German 1st Panzer Division lost 31 killed and 102 wounded while taking La Horgne. These losses included two officers, five non-commissioned officers and twenty-four enlisted men. Of the 399 men killed in the 1st Panzer Division during May 1940, the 31 killed at La Horgne represented slightly less than 8 per cent.

== In popular culture ==
The battle of 15 May 1940 is represented in a map of the game Forgotten Hope 2. The map includes a scale replica of the church of La Horgne and is based on research intended to reproduce the village layout, vegetation and defensive positions, including trenches, abatis, anti-tank guns and machine-gun positions, as they appeared at the time of the battle in 1940.

== Military cemetery ==
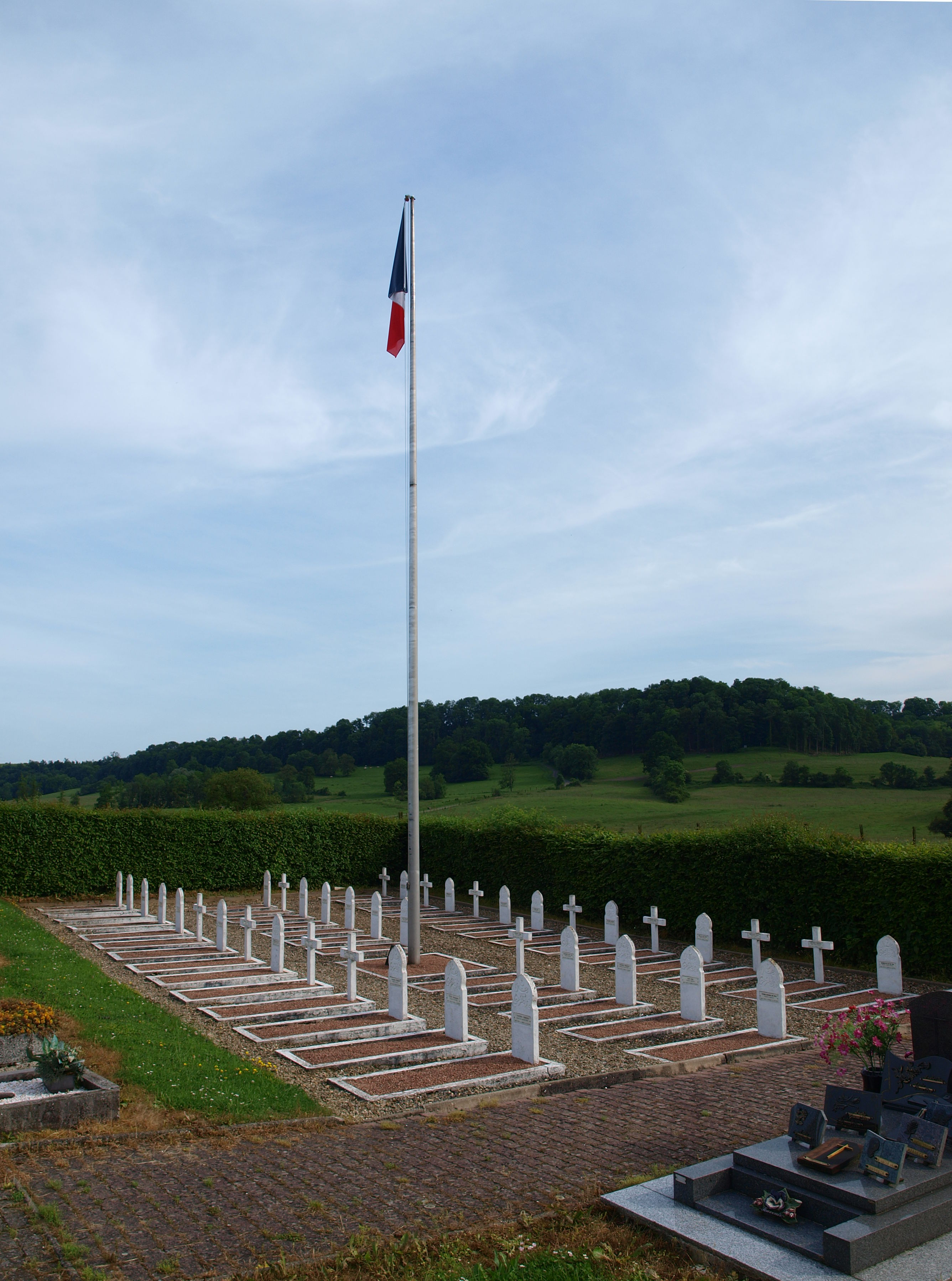
Military section of the cemetery at La Horgne.

At La Horgne, a military cemetery contains the Christian and Muslim graves of the spahis killed in the battle. The two regimental commanders, Colonel Emmanuel Burnol and Colonel Émile Geoffroy, are buried among their spahis.
