= Henry Horne =

Henry Horne may refer to:

- Henry Horne (MP) for Kent in 1404
- Henry Horne, 1st Baron Horne (1861–1929), British Army officer
- Henry Horne (Australian politician) (1872–1955), New South Wales politician
- Henry Horne (basketball), American basketball player

== See also ==
- Henry Horn (disambiguation)
- Henry de Menten de Horne (1896–1988), Belgian equestrian
