= Alexandre Bretillon =

Alexandre Albert Roger Bretillon
- Born: 23 September 1895; Courville, Haute Marne Department, France
- Died: 18 November 1978 (aged 83)
- Military career
- Allegiance: France
- Branch: Infantry; artillery; aviation
- Rank: Sous lieutenant
- Units: 39e Regiment de Infanterie, 18e Regiment d'Artillerie, Escadrille 79, Escadrille 49
- Awards: Légion d'honneur, Médaille militaire, Croix de Guerre with seven palmes, Mentioned in Dispatches five times

Sous lieutenant Alexandre Albert Roger Bretillon was a French World War I flying ace credited with nine aerial victories.

== Early life ==
Alexandre Albert Roger Bretillon was born 23 September 1895 in Curville.

== World War I ==
Bretillon joined the French military on 19 December 1914; he was initially assigned to infantry duty. On 18 April 1915, he transferred to artillery. On 13 March 1916, he was detached for aviation training. He was awarded Military Pilot's Brevet No. 1122 on 25 June 1916. In August, he was promoted to enlisted Brigadier. On 1 December, he was stationed with Escadrille 79.

On 17 March 1917, Bretillon scored his first win, downing a German Albatros. In May, he was advanced to Maréchal-des-logis.

On 15 February 1918, he was wounded in action over La Fere. By 24 March, he had recovered, and scored his second win on the same day he was awarded the Médaille militaire. Five days later, he was promoted to Adjutant. He resumed scoring on 24 March, and mounted victories right through until 21 October; on that date, he shared his ninth win with Jean G. Bouyer, Paul Hamot, and Maurice Arnoux.

== Post World War I ==
On 14 January 1919, Bretillon was awarded the Légion d'honneur to accompany his Médaille militaire and Croix de Guerre. No more is known at this time about this ace other than he died on 18 November 1978.

== Honors and awards ==
=== Medaille Militaire citation ===
Pursuit pilot with courage beyond compare who gives proof in all circumstances of his scorn for danger. On 19 December 1917, his plane being in flames at 6,000 meters by enemy action during the course of a combat, he succeeded in returning to ground safely. Has given proof of the highest audacity by not hesitating to attack an enemy two-seater protected by seven pursuit planes, and was wounded in the course of the battle. Previous wounds—three citations.

=== Legion d'honneur citation ===
Magnificent pursuit pilot of audacity mixed with great sang-froid. Guided by his own ardor, never hesitates to provoke and attack the enemy far behind its own lines. He has had therefore a series of combats, returning often with his plane riddled by bullets. On 27 August 1918 he attacked four enemy planes and downed one. Nine victories, 3 wounds, Medaille Militaire for feats of war. Five citations.
