= Münevver Belen Gözeler =

Turkish architect

Münevver Belen Gözeler (1913-1973) was a Turkish architect and one of the first female architects in Turkey. She was born in İzmit. She completed her secondary education at Erenköy Girls' High School in Istanbul. She began her architectural studies at the Academy of Fine Arts in Istanbul in the same year and graduated in 1934. She graduated from the Academy of Fine Arts in Istanbul in the same year as Leman Cevat Tomsu, with whom she collaborated for many years. She married engineer Mithat Gözeler in 1940.

She died in Istanbul in February 1973.

== Career ==
In 1935, Gözeler was appointed to the Construction Affairs Office. After working there for three months, she continued her career at the Istanbul Provincial Directorate. Until 1939, she worked in the provincial directorates of Bursa and Kocaeli as well as in the central office. Throughout her career, she worked as a civil servant, and her architectural projects were often produced within this institutional framework, which led many of her works to remain unattributed. Her architectural approach is generally characterized by a simple yet modern style. She continued working at the provincial directorate until her retirement.
