= Jean G. Bouyer =

French World War I flying ace

Jean Georges Bouyer
- Born: 12 January 1891; La Rochelle, France
- Died: 16 January 1926 (aged 35); Louveroy
- Military career
- Allegiance: France
- Branch: Infantry; aviation
- Rank: Sous lieutenant
- Units: 114e Regiment d'Infanterie, Escadrille 49
- Awards: Légion d'honneur, Médaille militaire, Croix de Guerre with eight palmes and an étoile d'argent, British Distinguished Conduct Medal

Sous lieutenant Jean Georges Bouyer was a French World War I flying ace credited with eleven confirmed aerial victories.

== Early life ==
Jean Georges Bouyer was born in La Rochelle, France on 12 January 1891.

== Military service ==
Bouyer joined the French infantry on 15 December 1911. On Christmas Day, 1914, he transferred to flying service as a bombardier assigned to the defense of Paris. When he was forwarded to aviation training, he earned Pilot's Brevet No. 5957 on 25 March 1917. On 16 May, he was posted to Escadrille N49 (the 'N' denoting the squadron's use of Nieuports).

He scored for the first time on 25 June 1917, downing an LVG two-seater reconnaissance plane. Four days later, he was promoted to Sergeant. On 7 July, he scored again. In August, he was medically evacuated to hospital. After his return to the unit, he scored again three times in December, becoming an ace.

On 4 January 1918, he was awarded the Médaille militaire; a prerequisite for the award was a prior award of the Croix de guerre. On 19 February 1918, having upgraded to a Spad, he notched win number six at Pfetterhouse. Bouyer then teamed with Adjutant Paul Hamot during May and July for four shared wins, over a Rumpler and some Albatroses. Then, on 27 July 1918, Bouyer became a Chevalier of the Légion d'honneur. On 19 September 1918, he was commissioned a Sous lieutenant. He scored one final victory on 21 October, sharing it with Maurice Arnoux and Alexandre Bretillon.

Jean Georges Bouyer perished in a flying accident on 16 January 1926 while piloting a Hanriot.

== Honors and awards ==
Médaille Militaire
"Brilliant pursuit pilot who always gives the highest example of modesty, skill and audacity. On 9 December 1917, after a hard combat, he succeeded in shooting down his 3rd enemy aircraft behind our lines." Médaille Militaire citation, 4 January 1918.

Chevalier de la Légion d'Honneur
"Elite pursuit pilot who is an example of devotion to all his unit through his splendid qualities of determination and bravery. Has downed in flames, behind its lines, an enemy aircraft reporting therewith his 8th victory. Médaille Militaire for feats of war. Five citations." Chevalier de la Légion d'Honneur citation, 27 July 1918.

Jean Georges Bouyer also won the Croix de guerre and the British Distinguished Conduct Medal
