= Saint-Crépin-Ibouvillers =

- Commune
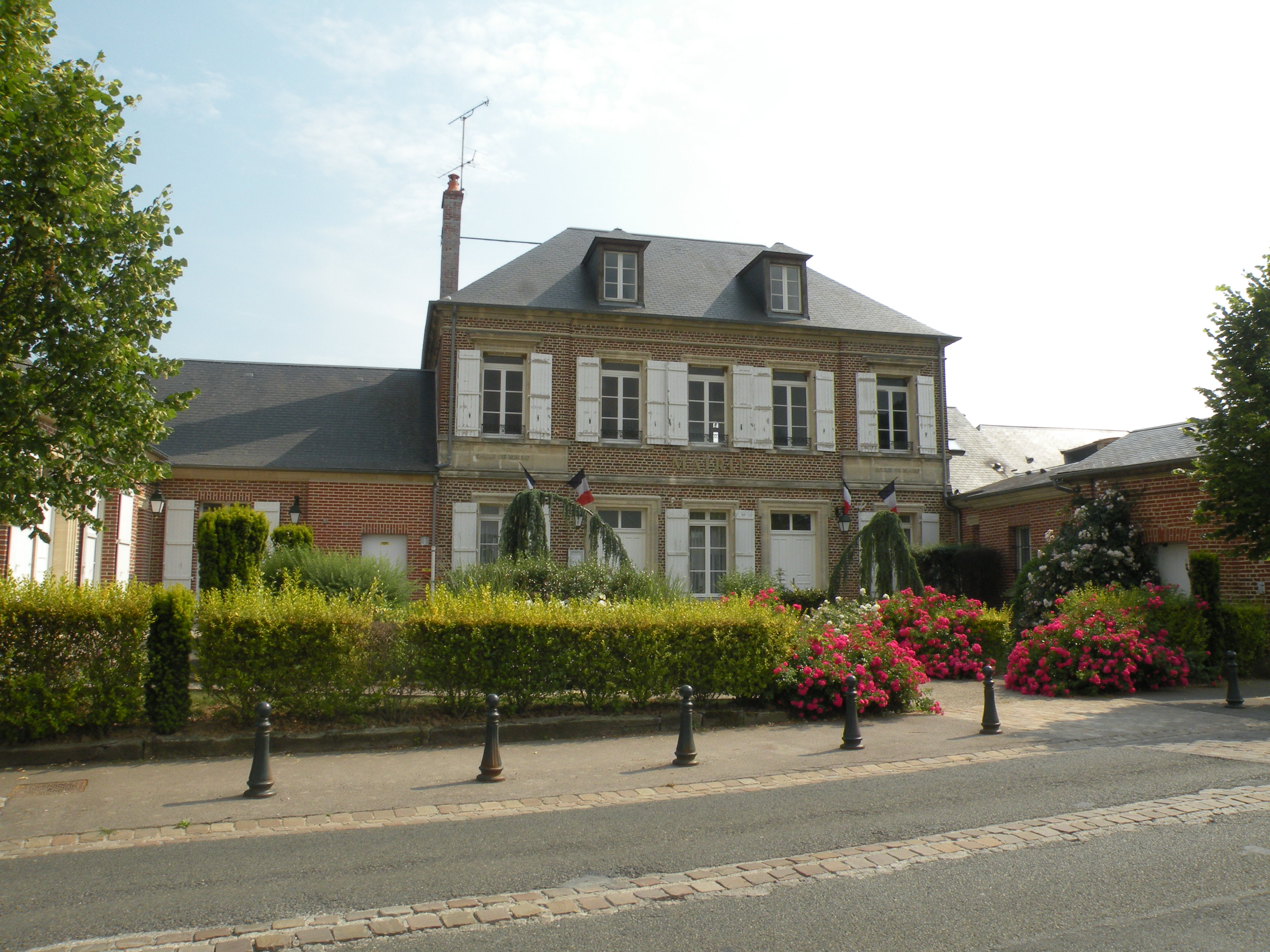
- The town hall in Saint-Crépin-Ibouvillers
- Location of Saint-Crépin-Ibouvillers
- Location within France Location within Hauts-de-France
- Coordinates: 49°15′50″N 2°04′24″E
- Country: France
- Region: Hauts-de-France
- Department: Oise
- Arrondissement: Beauvais
- Canton: Chaumont-en-Vexin
- Intercommunality: Sablons

Government
  - Mayor (2020–2026): Alain Letellier
- Area^{1}: 14.43 km^{2} (5.57 sq mi)
- Elevation: 106 m (348 ft)
- Highest elevation: 168 m (551 ft)
- Lowest elevation: 97 m (318 ft)
- Population (2023): 1,637
  - Density: 113.4/km^{2} (293.8/sq mi)
- Time zone: UTC+01:00 (CET)
  - Summer (DST): UTC+02:00 (CEST)
- INSEE/Postal code: 60570 /60149
- ^{1} French Land Register data, which excludes lakes, ponds, glaciers > 1 km^{2} (0.386 sq mi or 247 acres) and river estuaries.

Saint-Crépin-Ibouvillers is a commune in the Oise department in northern France. The village is located along the A16 Highspeed road (L'Isle-Adam to Bray-Dunes), 5 km from Méru (with regular train connections to Paris and Beauvais) and 28 km away from Beauvais-Tillé Airport. It absorbed the former commune Montherlant in January 2015. The municipality has a population of 1,548 as of 2018.

Saint-Crépin-Ibouvillers is known for its 13th-century church, a listed monument since 1932.

== See also ==
- Communes of the Oise department
