= Henry Horn (disambiguation) =

Henry Horn (1786–1862) was an American politician.

Henry Horn may also refer to:

- Henry S. Horn (1941–2019), American ecologist
- George Henry Horn (1840–1897), American entomologist

== See also ==
- Henry Horne (disambiguation)
