= Jean de Tilière =

French equestrian

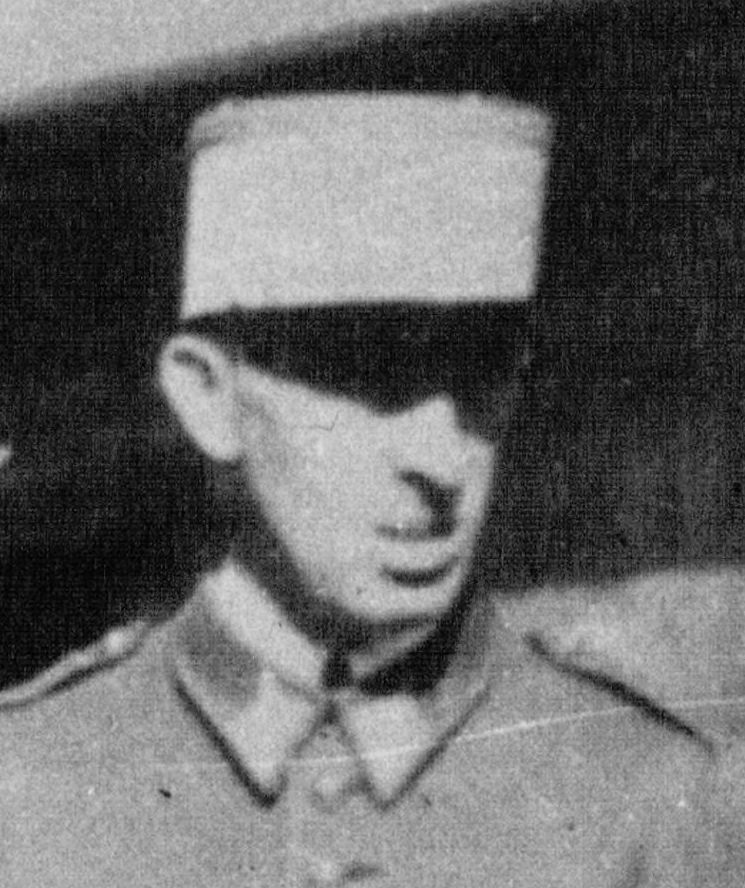
- Jean de Tilière in 1932.

Personal information
- Birth name: Félix Marie Jean Taupinart de Tilière
- Nationality: French
- Born: 19 September 1900; Châlons-sur-Marne, France
- Died: 30 November 1974 (aged 74); Clichy, France

Sport
- Sport: Equestrian

Félix Marie Jean Taupinart de Tilière (19 September 1900 – 30 November 1974) was a French cavalry officer and equestrian.

He joined the French Army on 27 August 1918. Trained after the War at the Saumur Cavalry School, he served in various cavalry regiments during the Interwar but he was often dispatched to prepare international equestrian events. He competed in two events at the 1936 Summer Olympics. During World War II, he served as a Captain in the 2nd Algerian Spahis Regiment. On 15 May 1940, he fought during the battle of La Horgne against the Germans. He was captured on that day but he was later awarded the Croix de Guerre 1939-1945 for his bravery during the combat.

Released from captivity after the German capitulation, he continued to serve in the French cavalry. From 1952 to 1954, he was attached to the private service of the King of Cambodia. He took his final retirement from the French Army reserve in 1961, with the rank of lieutenant colonel.
