= Keith Benson (rugby league) =

Australian rugby league footballer

Personal information
- Full name: Keith Reginald Benson
- Born: 25 October 1917; Kogarah, New South Wales
- Died: 18 December 1990 (aged 73); Sydney, New South Wales, Australia

Playing information
- Position: Centre
Club
Years	Team	Pld	T	G	FG	P
1940–41	St. George	9	5	1	0	17

Keith Reginald Benson (25 October 1917 – 18 December 1990) was an Australian rugby league footballer who played in the 1940s.

Benson was an ex Rugby Union first grade player and local athlete that swapped to Rugby League in 1940. He played many games in all grades for the St. George DRLFC but his career was affected by his service in World War II. He was still in the lower grades in the mid-1940s, before retiring.

Benson died on 18 December 1990.
