= Don Hooper =

Australian rules footballer

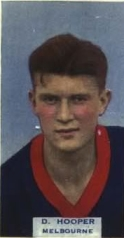

Personal information
- Full name: Donald James Hooper
- Born: 14 April 1914; Essendon, Victoria
- Died: 16 December 1990 (aged 76)
- Original team: Dandenong High School

Playing career^{1}
Years	Club	Games (Goals)
1932–1935, 1943	Melbourne	56 (30)
1936–1937	St Kilda	6 (1)
Total		62 (31)
- ^{1} Playing statistics correct to the end of 1943.

Donald James Hooper (14 April 1914 – 16 December 1990) was an Australian rules footballer who played with Melbourne and St Kilda in the Victorian Football League (VFL).

== Family ==
The son of Harold George Hooper and Ethel Hooper (1891-1949), née Rowe, Donald James Hooper was born in Raleigh St, Essendon on 1 April 1914.

== Football ==
Melbourne recruited Don Hooper from Dandenong High School, and when he broke into league ranks in 1932 he was one of the youngest ruckmen in the VFL. Three strong seasons led to his selection to tour South Australia with the state team in 1934, but he only played eight games the next year before being dropped. Hooper initially announced he'd continue play for the Melbourne Seconds, but after being pursued by North Melbourne signed with St Kilda. Hooper subsequently played for Ararat in 1938, before coaching Jeparit in 1939. He returned for three more games with the Demons in 1943 while serving in World War II..

== World War II ==
Hooper joined the Australian Army in 1940, initially serving in the Middle East from 1940 to 1943 where he was promoted to Sergeant. He returned to Australia in 1943, playing football briefly, before travelling to Scotland in 1944 to attend an Army Educational Course at St Andrews University. While there, he suffered an aneurysm in his thigh and subsequently had three toes amputated. He was discharged in November 1946.
