= Maurice Gudin de Vallerin =

French equestrian

Personal information
- Nationality: French
- Born: 15 March 1897; Montherlant, France
- Died: 18 July 1981 (aged 84); Fontainebleau, France

Sport
- Sport: Equestrian

Maurice Gudin de Vallerin (15 March 1897 – 18 July 1981) was a French equestrian. He competed in two events at the 1936 Summer Olympics.
