= Escadrille Spa.49 =

Escadrille MS49 / N49 / Spa49
- Active: 1915–1918
- Country: France
- Branch: French Air Service
- Type: Fighter Squadron
- Battle honours: Cited in orders

Escadrille Spa49 (also known as Escadrille MS49, Escadrille N49) was a squadron of the French Air Services active during World War I, from 1915 - 1918. Credited with 37 aerial victories over German aircraft, it won a unit citation on 8 November 1918.

== History ==
The unit began on 18 April 1915 as Escadrille MS49. It was assigned to the VII Armee sector of the Western Front. Refitting with Nieuport fighters changed its unit designation; on 20 September 1915, it was dubbed Escadrille N49. In December 1916, when the squadron re-equipped with SPADs, it was finally named Escadrille Spa49.

Escadrille Spa49 won a citation on 8 November 1918, for its victories over 32 German airplanes and two observation balloons. In the last three days of the war, it would score three additional victories. The squadron finished the war where it had begun it, with VII Armee.

== Commanding officers ==
- Capitaine Constantin Zarapoff: 18 April 1915
- Capitaine Jules de Boutiny: 22 May 1916
- Capitaine Charles Taver: 17 February 1918
- Lieutenant Roger Labauve: 8 November 1918.

== Notable members ==
- Capitaine Paul Gastin
- Sous lieutenant Jean G. Bouyer
- Adjutant Paul Hamot.

== Aircraft ==
- Morane-Saulniers: 18 April 1915
- Nieuports: 20 September 1915
- SPAD S.VIIs: December 1916
- SPAD S.XIs
- SPAD S.XIIIs.
