= Lindsay Fricker =

Australian rules footballer, born 1905

Personal information
- Full name: David Lindsay Fricker
- Born: 29 September 1905; Warragul, Victoria
- Died: 23 December 1990 (aged 85); Darwin, Northern Territory
- Original team: Sandringham

Playing career^{1}
Years	Club	Games (Goals)
1929	Sandringham (VFA)	20 (2)
1930	Fitzroy (VFL)	1 (0)
1931-1934	Sandringham (VFA)	21 (3)
- ^{1} Playing statistics correct to the end of 1930.

David Lindsay Fricker (29 September 1905 – 23 December 1990), known as "Lindsay Fricker", was an Australian rules footballer who played with Fitzroy in the Victorian Football League (VFL).

== Family ==
The son of David John Fricker (1874–1951), and Rosetta Ann Fricker (1869–1942), née Roberts, David Lindsay Fricker was born at Warragul on 29 September 1905.

He married Jeanne Davis McKay at Sandringham, Victoria on 6 March 1937.

== Football ==
=== Sandringham (VFA) ===
Recruited from the Black Rock Football Club in the Metropolitan Amateur Football Association (MAFA), he was a member of the team that played against Brighton Football Club in the Sandringham Football Club's first match in the Victorian Football Association (VFA) competition on 20 April 1929. Twice injured, he played in 20 of the team's 22 matches in that first season.

=== Fitzroy (VFL) ===
Cleared from Sandringham to Fitzroy in May 1930, his single senior game for the Fitzroy Football Club was against Carlton, at the Brunswick Street Oval, on 26 July 1930.

=== Sandringham (VFA) ===
Cleared from Fitzroy in April 1931, he returned to Sandringham, and went on to play another 21 senior matches over four seasons (1931–1934).

=== Black Rock (VAFA) ===
In 1935 he was cleared from Sandringham to the Black Rock Football Club in the Victorian Amateur Football Association (VAFA).

== Loss of right arm ==
On 27 November 1948, Fricker was involved in an accident when the car he was driving collided with a truck on the Calder Highway near Woodend, Victoria. A carpenter by trade, he lost his right arm and, three years later, was awarded £7,500 in damages.

== Death ==
He died at Darwin, Northern Territory on 23 December 1990.
