= Julius Čoček =

Czech equestrian

Personal information
- Nationality: Czech
- Born: 20 February 1900; Jezernice, Austria-Hungary
- Died: 7 September 1941 (aged 41); Velká Chuchle, Czechoslovakia

Sport
- Sport: Equestrian

Julius Čoček (20 February 1900 – 7 September 1941) was a Czech equestrian. He competed in two events at the 1936 Summer Olympics.
