= Henri van Schaik =

Dutch equestrian

Olympic medal record

Men's Equestrian
Silver medal – second place	1936 Berlin	Team jumping

Henri Louis Marie van Schaik (July 24, 1899 in Delft – August 19, 1991 in Cavendish, Vermont, United States) was a Dutch horse rider who competed in the 1936 Summer Olympics. In 1936, he and his horse Santa Bell won the silver medal as part of the Dutch show jumping team, after finishing 23rd in the individual jumping competition.
