= Fernando Filipponi =

Italian equestrian

Personal information
- Nationality: Italian
- Born: 3 April 1892

Sport
- Sport: Equestrian

Fernando Filipponi (born 3 April 1892, date of death unknown) was an Italian equestrian. He competed in two events at the 1936 Summer Olympics.
