= Halfdan Petterøe (equestrian) =

Norwegian equestrian

Personal information
- Nationality: Norwegian
- Born: 30 January 1906; Oslo, Norway
- Died: 15 February 1994 (aged 88); Oslo, Norway

Sport
- Sport: Equestrian

Halfdan Petterøe (30 January 1906 – 15 February 1994) was a Norwegian equestrian. He competed in two events at the 1936 Summer Olympics.
