= Jan de Bruine =

Dutch equestrian

Medal record

Equestrian

Representing Netherlands

Olympic Games
Silver medal – second place	1936 Berlin	Team jumping

Jan de Bruine (15 July 1903 – 4 April 1983) was a Dutch equestrian and Olympic medalist. He was born in Winschoten. He won a silver medal in show jumping at the 1936 Summer Olympics in Berlin.
