= Constantin Apostol =

Romanian equestrian

Personal information
- Nationality: Romanian
- Born: 18 August 1903; Buzău, Romania
- Died: 1995 (aged 91–92)

Sport
- Sport: Equestrian

Constantin Apostol (18 August 1903 – 1995) was a Romanian equestrian. He competed in two events at the 1936 Summer Olympics.

Apostol served in the Romanian army and held the rank of lieutenant-colonel. He led military campaigns against Germany, both within Germany and in Czechoslovakia. After the communist takeover and the establishment of the Socialist Republic of Romania, he was removed from the army due to the government considering him to be too wealthy.

In 1959, he was sentenced to prison due to being "against the social order". Following his release in 1964, he worked as a farmer in Buzău until his death in 1995. In 2010, the street where he was born was renamed in his honor.
