= Renzo Bonivento =

Italian equestrian

Personal information
- Nationality: Italian
- Born: 15 August 1902; Sassari, Italy
- Died: 24 May 1963 (aged 60); Venice, Italy

Sport
- Sport: Equestrian

Renzo Bonivento (15 August 1902 – 24 May 1963) was an Italian equestrian. He competed in two events at the 1936 Summer Olympics.
