= Georges Ganshof van der Meersch =

Belgian equestrian

Personal information
- Nationality: Belgian
- Born: 25 October 1898; Bruges, Belgium
- Died: 23 November 1973 (aged 75); Santa Barbara, California, United States

Sport
- Sport: Equestrian

Georges Ganshof van der Meersch (25 October 1898 – 23 November 1973) was a Belgian equestrian. He competed in two events at the 1936 Summer Olympics.
