= Rolf Örn =

Swedish equestrian

Personal information
- Nationality: Swedish
- Born: 5 January 1893; Gothenburg, Sweden
- Died: 4 April 1979 (aged 86); Stockholm, Sweden

Sport
- Sport: Equestrian

Rolf Örn (5 January 1893 – 4 April 1979) was a Swedish equestrian. He competed in two events at the 1936 Summer Olympics.
