= William B. Bradford =

American Olympics equestrian and US Army general

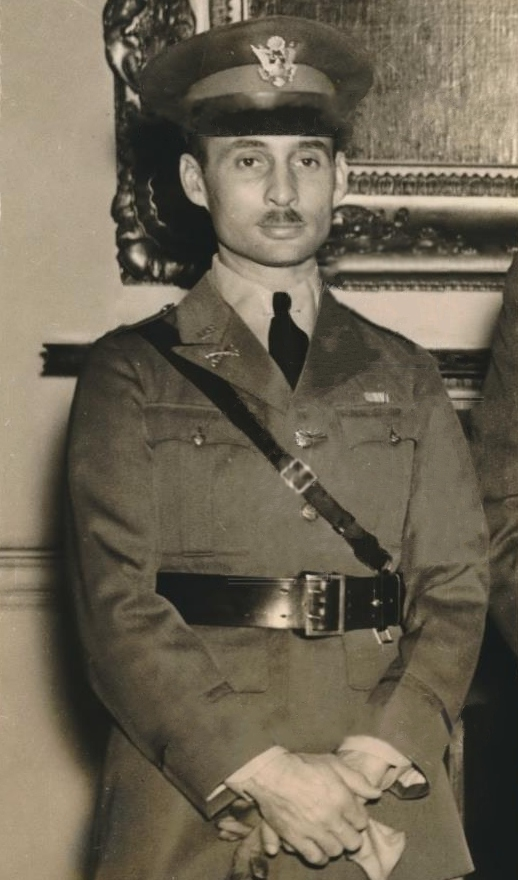
- Bradford in 1936

Personal information
- Born: March 15, 1896 Tallahassee, Florida, U.S.
- Died: January 12, 1965 (aged 68) Rome, Italy

Sport
- Sport: Horse riding
- Event: Show jumping
- Club: U.S. Army
Medal record
Bronze Star and Legion of Merit

William Brooks Bradford (March 15, 1896 – January 12, 1965) was an American Olympic equestrian and career army officer.

== Background ==
Bradford was born to John Taylor Bradford (1860–1900) and Ida Brooks Bradford (1863–1929) in Tallahassee, Florida. He graduated from the Virginia Military Institute in 1916 and later from the Saumur Cavalry School in France.

== Olympic career ==
Bradford participated with the Army Equestrian Team in the 1928 Summer Olympics in Amsterdam, the 1932 Summer Olympics in Los Angeles and was Captain of the team at the 1936 Summer Olympics in Berlin. He placed fourth individually in 1932 and fourth with the team in 1936. For his contributions to equestrian sport, he was awarded the Gold Napoleon Cup by the Polish Ambassador to the United States.

== Military career ==
Bradford was a career military officer and was eventually promoted to Major General over the course of his career. During World War II he served with distinction in the Pacific Theater and post-war, was Commander of the U.S. Forces in Trieste, Italy. He retired from military service in 1953.

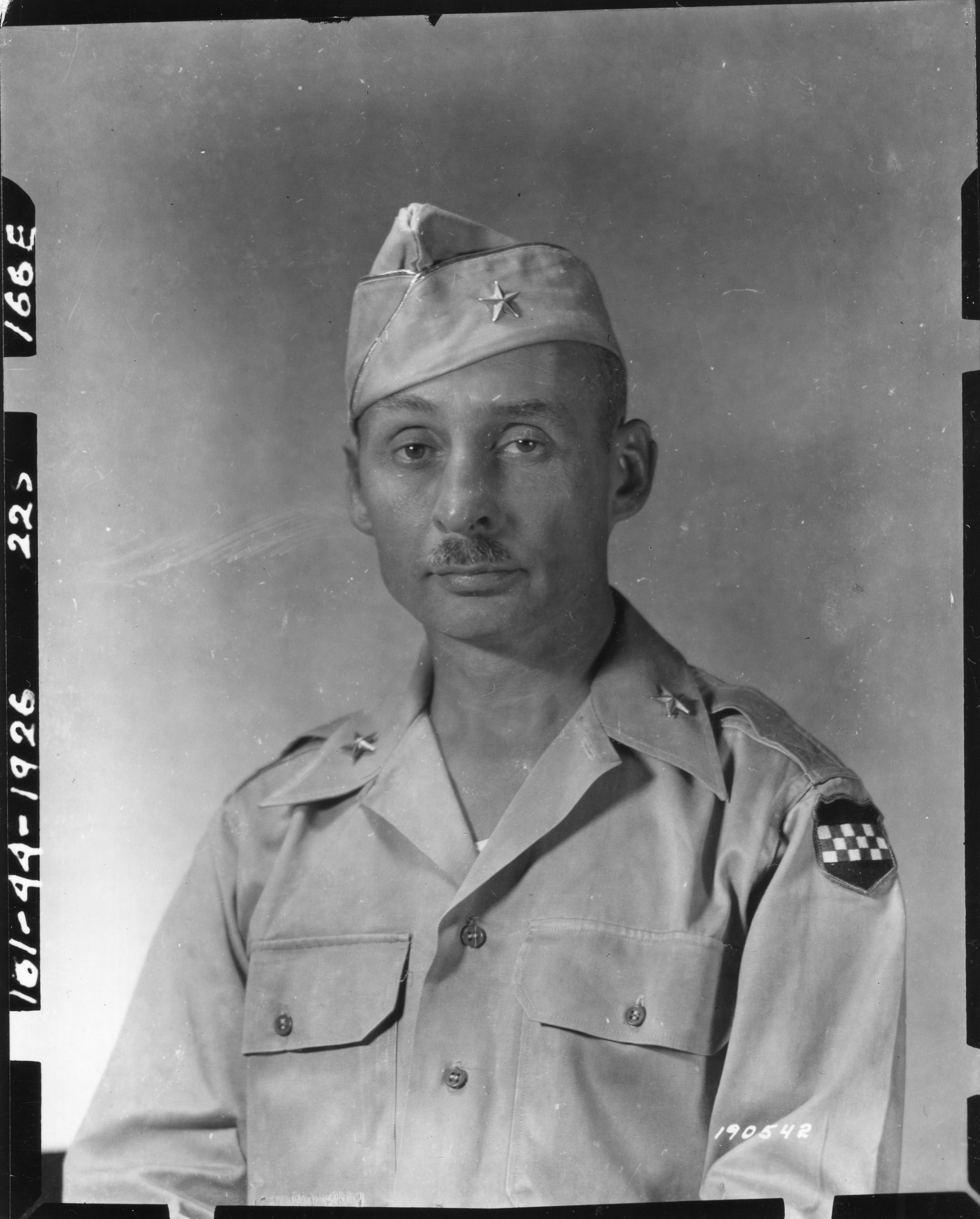
Portrait of Brig. General William Bradford, Assistant Commanding General of the 99th Infantry Division. South Pacific Area. 11 April 1944. Hdqrs USAFISFA

== Death ==
Bradford died on January 12, 1965, in Rome, Italy at the age of 68 following a prolonged illness. He was buried at Arlington National Cemetery, Section 34, Site 18-A.
