= Henrik Skougaard =

Norwegian equestrian

Personal information
- Nationality: Norwegian
- Born: 3 May 1910; Degernes, Norway
- Died: 23 August 1995 (aged 85); Akershus, Norway

Sport
- Sport: Equestrian

Henrik Skougaard (3 May 1910 – 23 August 1995) was a Norwegian equestrian. He competed in two events at the 1936 Summer Olympics.
