= Toma Tudoran =

Romanian equestrian

Personal information
- Nationality: Romanian
- Born: 12 April 1903; Iași, Austria-Hungary
- Died: 9 January 1975 (aged 71)

Sport
- Sport: Equestrian

Toma Tudoran (12 April 1903 – 9 January 1975) was a Romanian equestrian. He competed in two events at the 1936 Summer Olympics.
