= Gerardo Conforti =

Italian equestrian (1903–1982)

Personal information
- Nationality: Italian
- Born: 28 March 1903; Salerno, Italy
- Died: 29 June 1982 (aged 79); Naples, Italy

Sport
- Sport: Equestrian; Soccer player

Gerardo Conforti (28 March 1903 – 29 June 1982) was an Italian equestrian. He won different editions of the Piazza di Siena competition, and competed at the 1936 and the 1948 Summer Olympics.

== Biography ==
He was born from a wealthy family of Salerno, from Pasquale Conforti and Assunta Di Martino. His parents placed particular attention to his education, and prompted his admission in 1918 to the prestigious Nunziatella Military School of Naples. While a cadet of the school, he developed a particular passion and ability for soccer and became a permanent member of the Salernitana soccer team, playing as a defender. | Following his admission to the Infantry and Cavalry Academy of Modena, he was forced to stop playing soccer, and instead he became a skilled horseman.

In 1934 he won in Sanremo, on Claudine, and two years after he won the prestigious Premio Roma in Piazza di Siena on Sabà, interrupting five years of dominion from French horsemen and gaining a strong popularity in Italy. The victory allowed him to participate to Berlin Olympics as a member of the Italian team. In 1937, with a team composed of count Alessandro Bettoni Cazaggo, Ranieri di Campello e Frassetto, won the “Gran Premio delle Nazioni”, again in piazza di Siena. In 1939 he won again, as a member of a team composed of Bettoni, Filippini and Gutierrez.

He fought during World War II as a Cavalry lieutenant of Regiment "Savoia Cavalleria", and, with the rank of major, he was protagonist of the famous Izbushensky charge, the last cavalry charge of the Royal Italian Army. After the war, he became a director of the Italian committee of horsemanship, and he participated again in the 1948 Olympic games.
