= José Beltrão =

Portuguese equestrian (1905–1948)

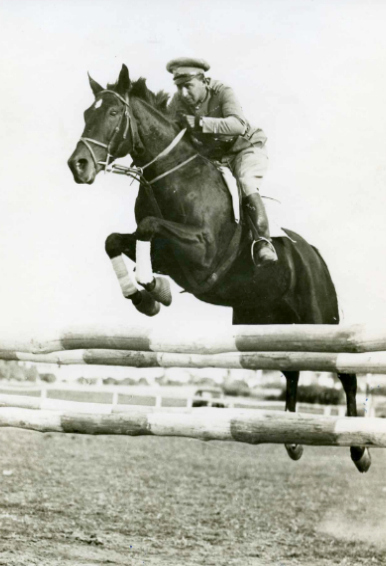

Personal information
- Born: 27 November 1905 Lisbon, Portugal
- Died: 1948 (aged approximately 42) Lisbon, Portugal

Sport
- Sport: Equestrianism
- Event: Show jumping
Medal record
Representing Portugal
Bronze medal – third place	1936 Berlin	Team jumping

José Gil de Gouveia Beltrão (27 November 1905 – 1948) was a Portuguese horse rider. At the 1936 Olympics he and his horse Biscuit won a team bronze medal in show jumping after finishing sixth individually.
