= Yves van Strydonk de Burkel =

Belgian equestrian

The High Wellborn Baron van Strydonk de Burkel
Personal information
- Full name: Yves Auguste Marie van Strydonck de Burkel
- Nationality: Belgian
- Citizenship: Belgium
- Born: 30 October 1907 Antwerp, Belgium
- Died: 28 January 1985 (aged 77) Etterbeek, Belgium

Sport
- Country: Belgium
- Sport: Equestrian

Yves Auguste Marie, 2nd Baron van Strydonck de Burkel (30 October 1907 – 28 January 1985) was a Belgian equestrian. He competed in two events at the 1936 Summer Olympics.

Belgian nobility
Preceded by Victor van Strydonck de Burkel	Baron van Strydonck de Burkel; 4 August 1961 –28 January 1985	Vacant
