= Rudolf Trenkwitz =

Austrian equestrian

Personal information
- Nationality: Austrian
- Born: 30 January 1906; Vienna, Austria
- Died: 2 January 1942 (aged 35); Gorky, USSR

Sport
- Sport: Equestrian

Rudolf Trenkwitz (30 January 1906 – 2 January 1942) was an Austrian equestrian. He competed in two events at the 1936 Summer Olympics. He was killed in action in a bombing raid during World War II.
