= Jack Talbot-Ponsonby =

British equestrian

Personal information
- Full name: John Arthur Talbot-Ponsonby
- Nationality: British
- Born: 10 March 1907 Naas, Ireland
- Died: 29 December 1969 (aged 62) Broughton, Oxfordshire, England

Sport
- Sport: Equestrian

Lieutenant-Colonel John Arthur Talbot-Ponsonby (10 March 1907 – 29 December 1969), better known as Jack Talbot-Ponsonby, was a British equestrian.

== Life ==
The only son of Major Edward Talbot-Ponsonby (1872–1946) and Marion Theodora née Nicholson (1873–1970), he was educated at Harrow School and Sandhurst.

Talbot-Ponsonby was commissioned into the 7th Hussars, before competing in two events at the 1936 Summer Olympics.

A cadet of the Earls of Shrewsbury, his father was the eldest surviving son of Admiral Sir Charles Talbot and the Hon. Charlotte Ponsonby.
