= Michał Gutowski =

Polish equestrian

Personal information
- Nationality: Polish
- Born: 14 September 1910; Maciszewice, Poland
- Died: 23 August 2006 (aged 95); Warsaw, Poland

Sport
- Sport: Equestrian

Michał Mieczysław Wojciech Gutowski (14 September 1910 – 23 August 2006) was a Brigadier General of the Polish Army and an equestrian. He competed in two events at the 1936 Summer Olympics.

Gutowski was a career officer of the Polish Army. He fought in the September Campaign of World War II. After the Polish defeat he joined the Polish Armed Forces in the West in France and eventually in Britain. He fought in the 1st Armoured Division under General Stanisław Maczek, among others in the Battle of Falaise.

After the war he emigrated to Canada where he worked as a military instructor for Canadian forces. He later established an equestrian club and trained Canadian equestrian riders.

Gutowski was awarded multiple state and military awards, among others Virtuti Militari, Order of Polonia Restituta or Légion d'honneur. He was buried at the Powązki Military Cemetery in Warsaw.
