= La Horgne =

- Commune
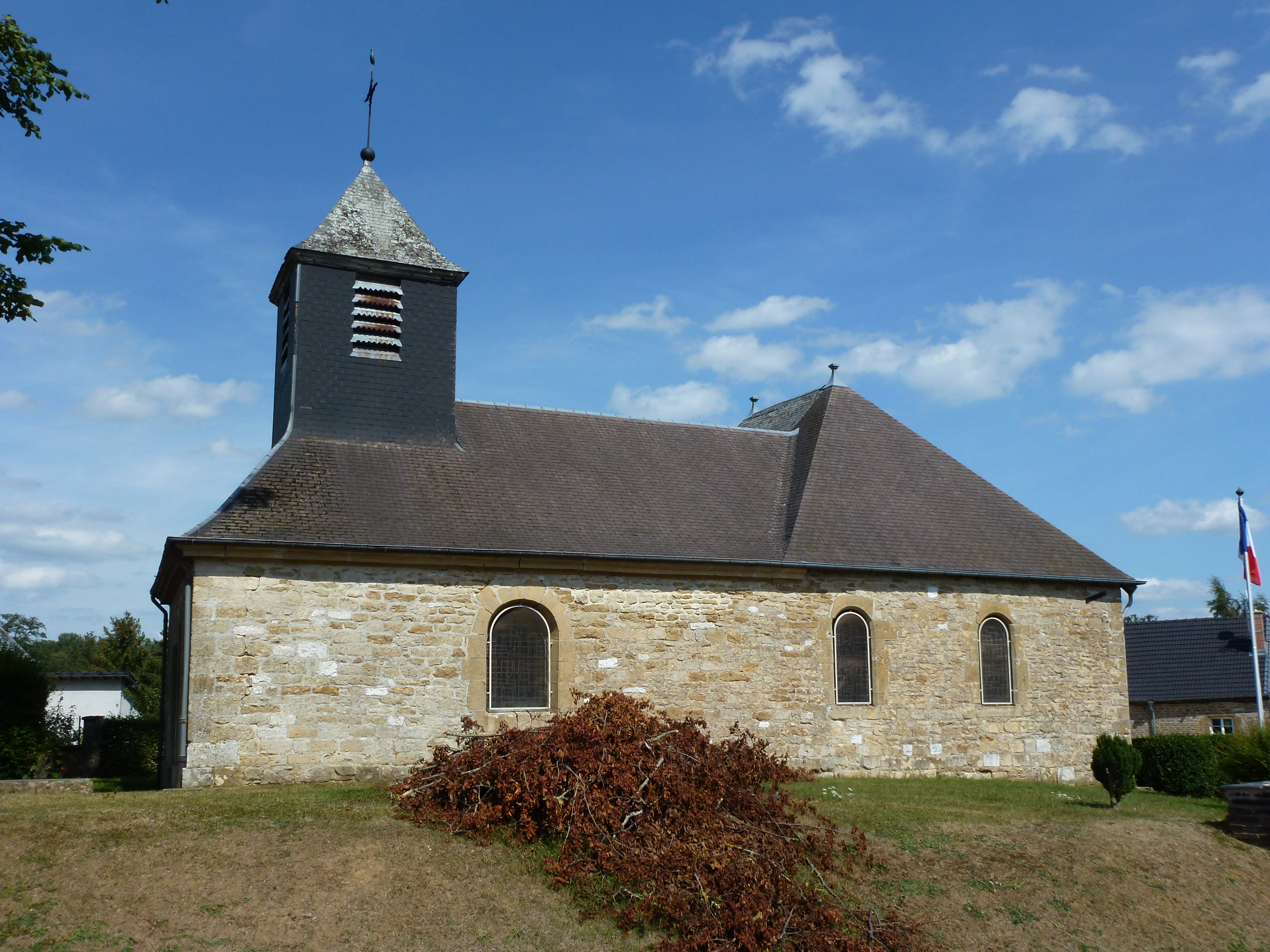
- The church in La Horgne
- Location of La Horgne
- Location within France Location within Grand Est
- Coordinates: 49°37′40″N 4°40′16″E
- Country: France
- Region: Grand Est
- Department: Ardennes
- Arrondissement: Charleville-Mézières
- Canton: Nouvion-sur-Meuse
- Intercommunality: Crêtes Préardennaises

Government
  - Mayor (2020–2026): Nadine Templier
- Area^{1}: 5.27 km^{2} (2.03 sq mi)
- Elevation: 210 m (690 ft)
- Population (2023): 154
  - Density: 29.2/km^{2} (75.7/sq mi)
- Time zone: UTC+01:00 (CET)
  - Summer (DST): UTC+02:00 (CEST)
- INSEE/Postal code: 08228 /08430
- ^{1} French Land Register data, which excludes lakes, ponds, glaciers > 1 km^{2} (0.386 sq mi or 247 acres) and river estuaries.

La Horgne (French pronunciation: [la ɔʁɲ]) is a commune in the Ardennes department in northern France.

== History ==
During the German Invasion of France there was a battle fought at La Horgne on 15 May 1940. The German 1st Rifle Regiment were advancing as part of Kampfgruppe Krüger when they came up against the French 3rd Spahis Brigade who had fortified the village. The local geography prohibited the use of tanks and artillery to support the infantry attack which failed to break through. The regimental commander, Oberstleutnant Hermann Balck, came forward to lead his men and encourage them. The village fell to the Germans by the afternoon but delayed their advance and inflicted more casualties on the regiment than any other day of the campaign.

Of his opponents, Balch recorded -

I fought against all foes in both wars and I was always in the thick of it. Rarely did anyone fight as outstandingly as the 3rd Spahis Brigade. Its commander, Colonel Maré, was captured having been wounded... Out of the brigade's twenty-seven officers, twelve were killed in action, seven were wounded, along with 610 Spahi dead or wounded. The brigade had ceased to exist. It had sacrificed itself for France. I gave orders that prisoners we took be given especially good treatment.

— Hermann Balck, Ordnung im Chaos / Erinnerungen 1893 - 1948

== Population ==
Historical population
Year	Pop.	±% p.a.
1968	53	—
1975	53	+0.00%
1982	81	+6.25%
1990	107	+3.54%
1999	106	−0.10%
2007	182	+6.99%
2012	200	+1.90%
2017	194	−0.61%
2023	154	−3.78%
Source: INSEE

== See also ==
- Communes of the Ardennes department
- Battle of La Horgne (in French)
