= Johan Greter =

Dutch equestrian (1900–1975)

Olympic medal record

Men's equestrian

Representing the Netherlands
Silver medal – second place	1936 Berlin	Team jumping

Johan Jacob Greter (25 October 1900 in Amsterdam – 29 January 1975 in Ede) was a Dutch equestrian who competed in the 1936 Summer Olympics. In 1936 he and his horse Ernica won the silver medal as part of the Dutch show jumping team, after finishing sixth in the individual jumping competition.

Greter fought at the Grebbeberg on 12 May 1940. In 1942 he was taken prisoner. He escaped by jumping off the train and reached England, where he joined the RAF. He was awarded the Dutch Bronze Cross in 1944 and 1947.
