= Marten von Barnekow =

German equestrian

Medal record

Equestrian

Representing Germany

Olympic Games
Gold medal – first place	1936 Berlin	Show jumping, Team

Marten von Barnekow (18 March 1900 in Bromberg – 29 January 1967 in Rehau) was a German equestrian and Olympic champion. He won a gold medal in show jumping with the German team at the 1936 Summer Olympics in Berlin.
