= Kurt Hasse =

German equestrian

Medal record

Representing Germany

Men's equestrian

Olympic Games
| Gold medal – first place | 1936 Berlin | Individual jumping |
| Gold medal – first place | 1936 Berlin | Team jumping |

Kurt Hasse (7 February 1907 – 9 January 1944) was a German show jumping champion, and 1936 Olympic champion. He was killed in action in the Soviet Union on the Eastern Front during World War II.

== Olympic record ==
Hasse participated at the 1936 Summer Olympics in Berlin, where he won a gold medal in individual jumping, and also a team gold medal with the horse Tora.
