= Hans Iklé =

Swiss equestrian

Personal information
- Nationality: Swiss
- Born: 31 March 1906; St. Gallen, Switzerland
- Died: 22 February 1996 (aged 89); Hombrechtikon, Switzerland

Sport
- Sport: Equestrian

Hans Iklé (31 March 1906 – 22 February 1996) was a Swiss equestrian. He competed in two events at the 1936 Summer Olympics.
