= Elemér von Barcza =

Hungarian equestrian (1904–1987)

Personal information
- Nationality: Hungarian
- Born: 13 September 1904; Komárom, Austria-Hungary
- Died: 13 July 1987 (aged 82); Buenos Aires, Argentina

Sport
- Sport: Equestrian

Elemér von Barcza (13 September 1904 – 13 July 1987) was a Hungarian equestrian. He competed in two events at the 1936 Summer Olympics.
