= Xavier Bizard =

French equestrian (1899–1956)

Personal information
- Nationality: French
- Born: 1 January 1899; Lille, France
- Died: 20 August 1956 (aged 57); Confolens, France

Sport
- Sport: Equestrian

Xavier Bizard (1 January 1899 – 20 August 1956) was a French equestrian. He competed in two events at the 1936 Summer Olympics.
