= Janusz Komorowski =

Polish equestrian

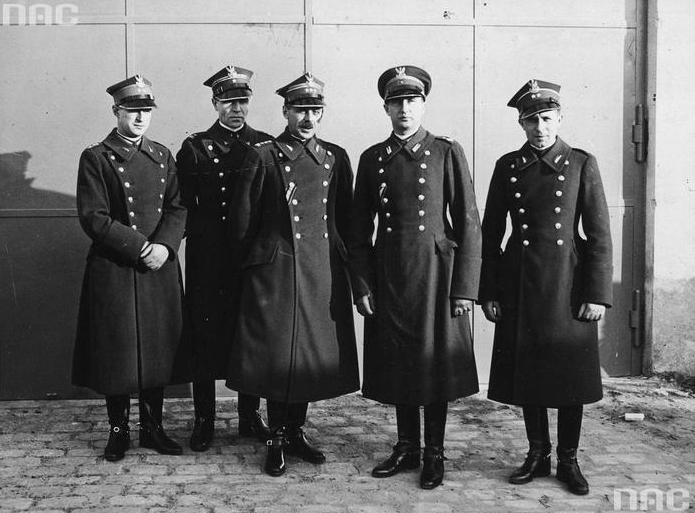
- Janusz Komorowski (left), 1936

Personal information
- Nationality: Polish
- Born: 9 October 1905; Warsaw, Poland
- Died: 24 November 1993 (aged 88); Warsaw, Poland

Sport
- Sport: Equestrian

Janusz Komorowski (9 October 1905 – 24 November 1993) was a Polish equestrian. He competed in two events at the 1936 Summer Olympics.
