= Leman Tomsu =

Turkish architect

- Born: 1913
- Died: 1988 (aged 74–75)
- Occupation: Architect

Leman Cevat Tomsu (1913–1988) was a Turkish architect. Together with Münevver Belen, she was one of the first Turkish women to qualify as an architect when she graduated in 1934 from the Academy of Fine Arts, Istanbul. She was also the first women to teach architecture in Turkey. Later she became a professor at Istanbul Technical University.

Tomsu designed the Kayseri Theatre (Public House) after winning an architectural competition in 1937.

Between 1938 and 1954, Tomsu received 14 awards in architectural competitions, including five first prizes. In addition, she completed 17 built projects between 1936 and 1959. Compared to her contemporaries, these achievements represent a significant professional success.

Among her nearly twenty built projects are the Cerrahpaşa Polyclinic Building, the Samsun Central Bank competition project, a casino project in Tozkoparan, the Şehremini Community Center project, the Kayseri Community Center building, a residential project in Etlik (Ankara), and the Gerede Community Center project.

Tomsu retired in 1975 and died on 29 April 1988.
