= Gerhard Egger =

Austrian equestrian

Personal information
- Nationality: Austrian
- Born: 13 October 1908
- Died: 28 April 1945 (aged 36); Italy

Sport
- Sport: Equestrian

Gerhard Egger (13 October 1908 – 28 April 1945) was an Austrian equestrian. He competed in two events at the 1936 Summer Olympics. He was killed in action during World War II.
