= Jörg Fehr =

Swiss equestrian

Personal information
- Nationality: Swiss
- Born: 10 February 1912
- Died: 1996 (aged 83–84)

Sport
- Sport: Equestrian

Jörg Fehr (10 February 1912 – 1996) was a Swiss equestrian. He competed in two events at the 1936 Summer Olympics.
