= Arnold Mettler =

Swiss equestrian

Personal information
- Nationality: Swiss
- Born: 14 May 1905; St. Gallen, Switzerland
- Died: 1 September 1996 (aged 91); St. Gallen, Switzerland

Sport
- Sport: Equestrian

Arnold Mettler (14 May 1905 – 1 September 1996) was a Swiss equestrian. He competed in two events at the 1936 Summer Olympics.
