= Bill Carr (equestrian) =

British equestrian

Personal information
- Nationality: British
- Born: 10 March 1901; Kensington, England
- Died: 27 January 1982 (aged 80); Blyth, England

Sport
- Sport: Equestrian

Bill Carr (10 March 1901 – 27 January 1982) was a British equestrian. He competed in two events at the 1936 Summer Olympics.
