= Henri Rang =

Romanian equestrian

Medal record

Men's Equestrian

Representing Romania

Olympic Games
Silver medal – second place	1936 Berlin	Individual jumping

Henri Rang (8 June 1902 in Lugoj – 25 December 1946 in Iași) was a Romanian horse rider who competed in the 1936 Summer Olympics. In 1936 he and his horse Delfis won the silver medal in the individual jumping competition. Winning Romania's 1st Olympic Medal

He died in a motorcycle accident on Christmas Day 1946, riding his Zündapp sidecar, a gift from Adolf Hitler following his Olympics performance.
