= Tadeusz Sokołowski =

Polish equestrian

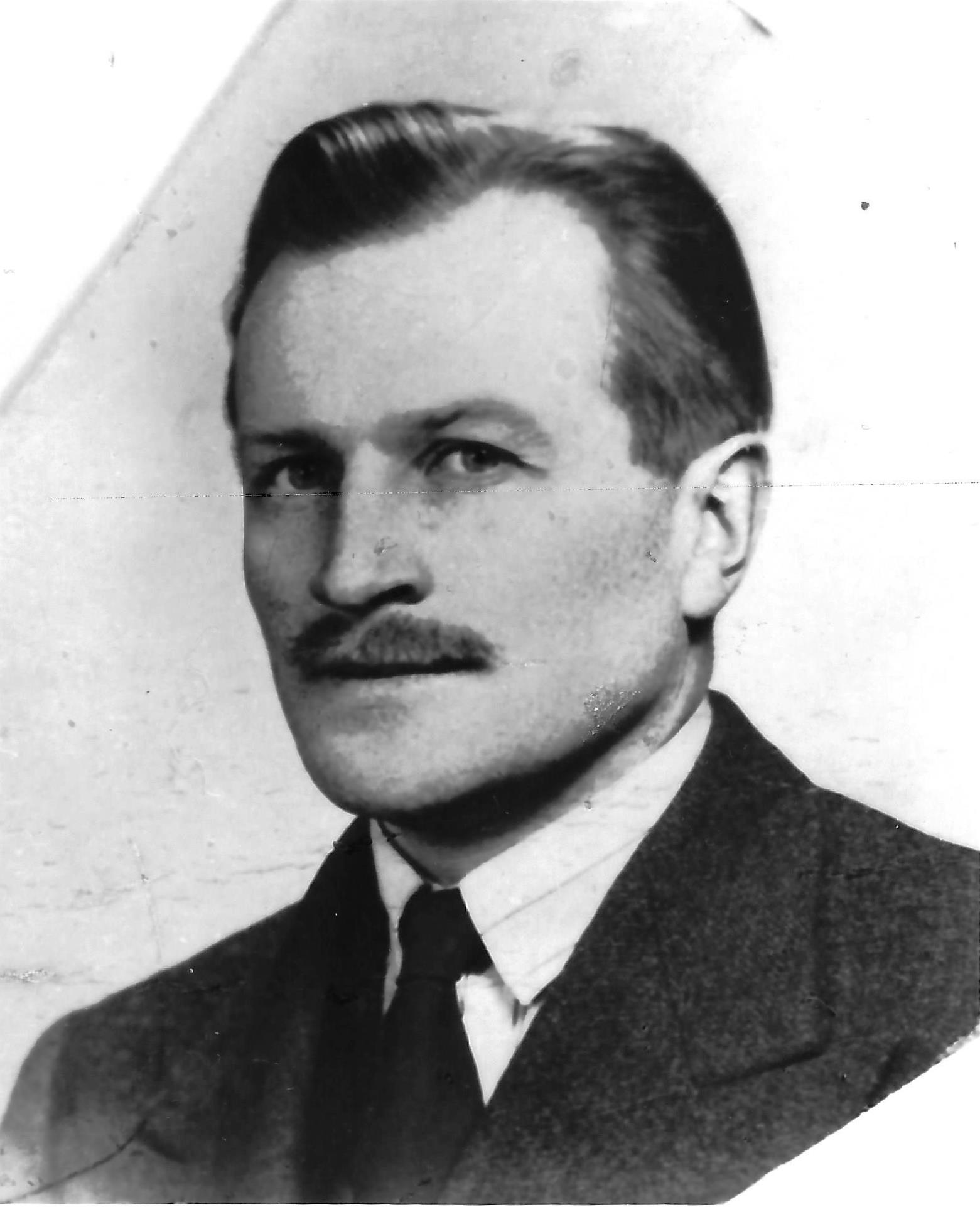

Personal information
- Nationality: Polish
- Born: 25 September 1905; Grodno, Russian Empire
- Died: 6 February 1943 (aged 37); Minsk, Reichskommissariat Ostland

Sport
- Sport: Equestrian

Tadeusz Sokołowski (25 September 1905 – 6 February 1943) was a Polish equestrian. He competed in two events at the 1936 Summer Olympics. He was killed by the Gestapo during World War II.
