= Hirotsugu Inanami =

Japanese equestrian

Personal information
- Nationality: Japanese
- Born: 1 December 1908; Toyama Prefecture
- Died: 21 December 1983 (aged 75)

Sport
- Sport: Equestrian

Hirotsugu Inanami (1 December 1908 - 21 December 1983) was a Japanese equestrian. He competed in two events at the 1936 Summer Olympics.
