= Domingos de Sousa =

Portuguese equestrian (1896–1984)

Olympic medal record

Men's Equestrian
Bronze medal – third place	1936 Berlin	Team jumping

Domingos António de Sousa Coutinho, Marquês do Funchal (19 October 1896 in Lisbon - 27 September 1984 in Lisbon) was a Portuguese horse rider who competed in the 1936 Summer Olympics.

In 1936 he and his horse Merle Blanc won the bronze medal as part of the Portuguese show jumping team, after finishing 16th in the individual jumping competition.
