= Cevat Gürkan =

Turkish equestrian

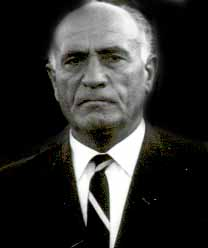

Personal information
- Nationality: Turkish
- Born: 10 September 1907
- Died: 1984 (aged 76–77)

Sport
- Sport: Equestrian

Cevat Gürkan (10 September 1907 – 1984) was a Turkish equestrian. He competed in two events at the 1936 Summer Olympics.
