= Henry de Menten de Horne =

Belgian equestrian

Personal information
- Nationality: Belgian
- Born: 7 December 1896; Vieux-Waleffe, Belgium
- Died: 27 December 1988 (aged 92); Etterbeek, Belgium

Sport
- Sport: Equestrian

Henry de Menten de Horne (7 December 1896 – 27 December 1988) was a Belgian equestrian. He competed in two events at the 1936 Summer Olympics.
