= József von Platthy =

Hungarian equestrian

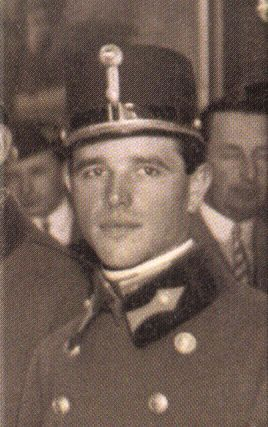

Personal information
- Nationality: Hungary
- Discipline: Show jumping
- Born: 17 December 1900; Karancskeszi, Hungary
- Died: 21 December 1990 (aged 90); Budapest, Hungary
Medal record
Bronze medal of József von Platthy - 1936 Olympic Games - Show Jumping
Representing Hungary
Equestrian
Olympic Games
Bronze medal – third place	1936 Berlin	Individual jumping

József von Platthy (17 December 1900 – 21 December 1990) was a Hungarian military officier and horse rider who competed in the 1936 Summer Olympics.

In 1936 he and his horse Sellő won the bronze medal in the individual jumping competition.
