= Montherlant, Oise =

Montherlant
- Part of Saint-Crépin-Ibouvillers
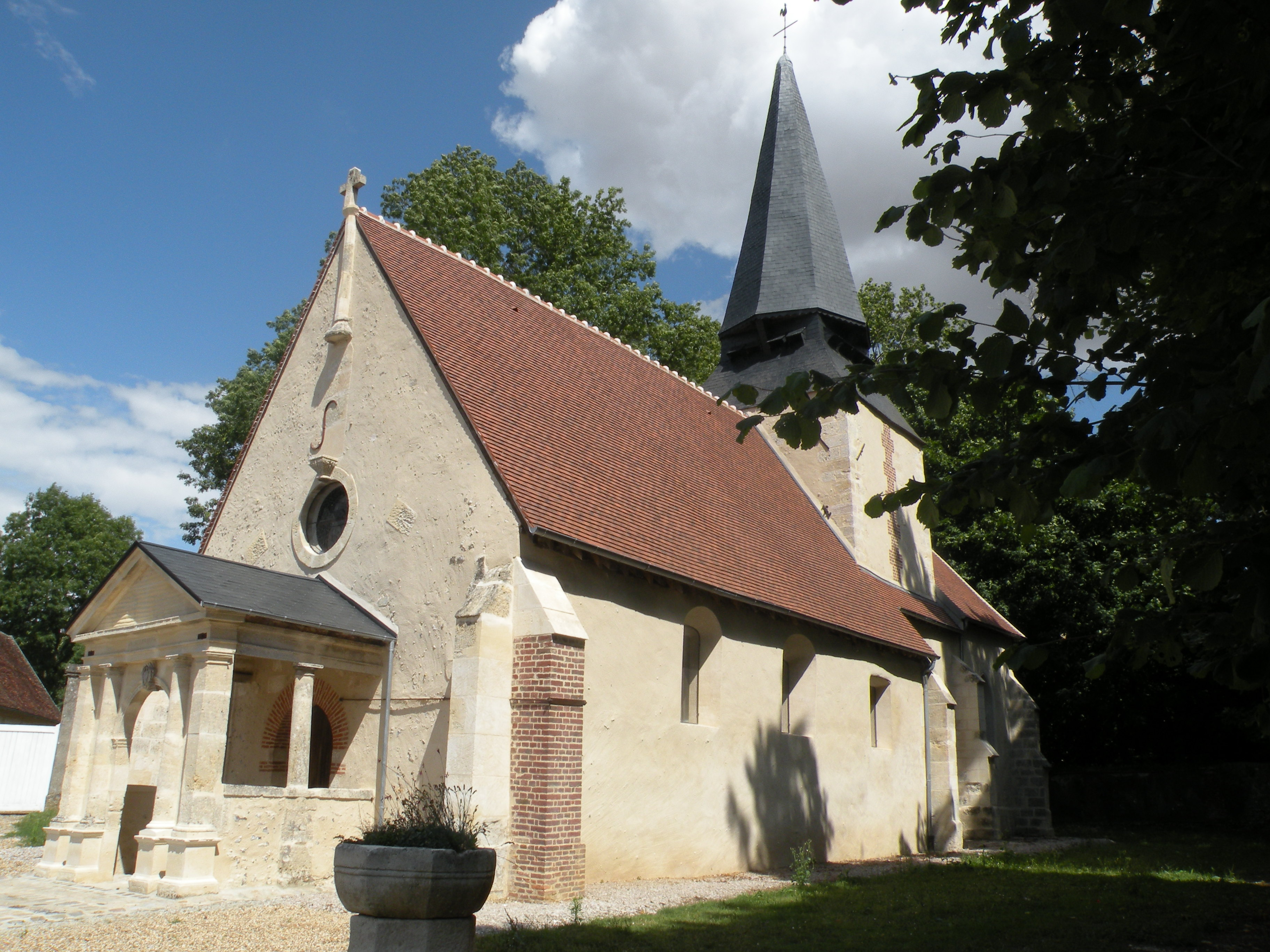
- Church of the Assumption
- Location of Montherlant
- Location within France Location within Hauts-de-France
- Coordinates: 49°16′44″N 2°03′01″E
- Country: France
- Region: Hauts-de-France
- Department: Oise
- Arrondissement: Beauvais
- Canton: Méru
- Commune: Saint-Crépin-Ibouvillers
- Area^{1}: 5.18 km^{2} (2.00 sq mi)
- Elevation: 146 m (479 ft)
- Highest elevation: 190 m (620 ft)
- Lowest elevation: 119 m (390 ft)
- Population (2022): 165
  - Density: 31.9/km^{2} (82.5/sq mi)
- Time zone: UTC+01:00 (CET)
  - Summer (DST): UTC+02:00 (CEST)
- Postal code: 60790
- ^{1} French Land Register data, which excludes lakes, ponds, glaciers > 1 km^{2} (0.386 sq mi or 247 acres) and river estuaries.

Montherlant (French pronunciation: [mɔ̃tɛʁlɑ̃]) is a former commune in the Oise department in northern France. It joined the commune of Saint-Crépin-Ibouvillers in January 2015.

== See also ==
- Communes of the Oise department
