= Cevat Kula =

Turkish equestrian

Personal information
- Nationality: Turkish
- Born: 7 July 1902
- Died: 20 April 1977 (aged 74); Ankara, Turkey

Sport
- Sport: Equestrian

Cevat Kula (7 July 1902 – 20 April 1977) was a Turkish equestrian. He competed in two events at the 1936 Summer Olympics.
