= Ottmár Szepesi =

Hungarian equestrian

Personal information
- Nationality: Hungarian
- Born: 22 December 1901; Budapest, Austria-Hungary
- Died: 24 August 1965 (aged 63); Budapest, Hungary

Sport
- Sport: Equestrian

Ottmár Szepesi (22 December 1901 – 24 August 1965) was a Hungarian equestrian. He competed in two events at the 1936 Summer Olympics.

Szepesi finished his studies at the Ludovica Military Academy in 1921. He went on to participate in a riding course from 1923 to 1924, and by 1927, he had achieved national recognition for his equestrian skills, winning the championship in eventing that year. He served as both a student and an instructor at the Riding and Driving Teacher Training School from 1928 to 1931. Szepesi was part of the Hungarian equester team that in 1931 won the Nations Prize at Salzburg. He also had a winning streak in the Hungarian championships, not only securing the title in show jumping three times from 1931 to 1933, but also by defeating the team from Germany and winning the Nations Prize at Aachen in 1935. His performance at the Berlin Olympics in 1936 had him finishing in 32nd place for the show jumping event.

Szepesi served in the military during World War II, and in 1945, he was a member of the newly organized Hungarian Army. He worked in the Department of Defense until his retirement in 1948. In 1946, he founded the Honvéd Sports Stable, which later become the basis for the equestrian division of Budapest Honvéd FC.

Following a long break from the sport, Szepesi resumed his equestrian pursuits in 1959, playing a key role in creating a trotting track and reviving the sport of gallop racing. He served as a riding instructor at the Poroszló Medosz Sports Club, and in 1963, he transitioned to the Horse Breeding Directorate within the Ministry of Finance in Alag.
