= Deaths in March 1989 =

The following is a list of notable deaths in March 1989.

Entries for each day are listed alphabetically by surname. A typical entry lists information in the following sequence:

- Name, age, country of citizenship at birth, subsequent country of citizenship (if applicable), reason for notability, cause of death (if known), and reference.

== March 1989 ==
=== 1 ===
- Annie Ackerman, 75, American political activist.
- Mukul Dey, 93, Indian artist (drypoint-etching).
- Sammy Moore, 88, Irish Olympic water polo player (1928).
- Vasantdada Patil, 71, Indian politician, Governor of Rajasthan.
- Odie Payne, 62, American blues drummer.
- Frank W. Preston, 92, English-American engineer, ecologist and conservationist.
- Mark M. Ravitch, 78, American surgeon (surgical staples), colon and prostate cancer.

=== 2 ===
- Liviu Cornel Babeș, 46, Romanian electrician and painter, committed suicide by self-immolation as a political protest.
- John Bryans, British actor (Blake's 7).
- Claus Egil Feyling, 72, Norwegian politician.
- Luigi Firpo, 74, Italian historian and politician.
- Tamás Kertész, 59, Hungarian international footballer and coach (Ferencvárosi, Hungary).
- Ernest Steven Monteiro, 84, Singaporean physician, Singapore Ambassador to the United States, Cambodia and Brazil, liver failure.

=== 3 ===
- James Brook, 92, English cricketer.
- Bill Harvey, 80, American Negro Leagues baseball player.
- Jackie Hegan, 88, English Olympic footballer (1920).
- Ned McGehee, 81, American college baseball and football coach (Southeastern Louisiana Lions).
- Richard B. Morris, 84, American historian, melanoma.
- Dong Qiwu, 89, Chinese general in the People's Liberation Army.
- Vytautas Vičiulis, 37, Lithuanian painter, self-immolation as a political protest.

=== 4 ===
- Agha Ibrahim Akram, 65, Pakistani army general.
- Tiny Grimes, 72, American jazz and R&B guitarist, meningitis.
- Viktor Nikiforov, 57, Soviet ice hockey player and Olympic gold medalist (1956).
- Edward Makuka Nkoloso, 69–70, member of Zambian resistance movement, planned to beat the U.S. and Soviet Union to the moon.

=== 5 ===
- Prithvi Singh Azad, 96, Indian independence activist, founder of Ghadar Party.
- Daniel Webster Cluff, 72, United States Coast Guard officer, rescued thirty-two survivors from SS Pendleton.
- Wes Dove, 25, American NFL player (Seattle Seahawks).
- James Edwin Doyle, 86, American advertising executive, co-founder of Doyle Dane Bernbach agency, emphysema.
- Richmond Barthé, 88, American sculptor of busts.
- Ray Hunt, 70, Australian rules footballer.

=== 6 ===
- Harry Andrews, 77, English actor (The Hill, The Agony and the Ecstasy).
- John Green, 67, American NFL player (Philadelphia Eagles).
- Hans-Joachim Hannemann, 73, German Olympic rower (1936).
- Alla Ilchun, 62, Chinese-born Kazakh fashion model.
- Raja Hossain Khan, 50–51, Bangladeshi composer and violinist, road accident.
- Franca Marzi, 62, Italian film actress (Nights of Cabiria).
- Amir Habibullah Khan Saadi, 79, Indian-born Pakistani freedom fighter.
- Fritz Stoll, 80, American Olympic soccer player (1936).
- Werner Walldén, 89, Finnish Olympic equestrian (1936).

=== 7 ===
- Paul Boesch, 76, American professional wrestler and promoter (Houston Wrestling), heart attack.
- Jerry Bywaters, 82, American artist, museum director and art critic.
- Jean Colin, 83, English actress.
- Avis DeVoto, 84, American culinary editor and cook, pancreatic cancer.
- Gi Hyeong-do, 28–29, Korean poet (The Black Leaf in My Mouth).
- Judson Philips, 85, American writer, emphysema.
- Norman Saunders, 82, American commercial artist.
- Karel Velebný, 57, Czech jazz musician and composer.

=== 8 ===
- Elisaveta Bykova, 75, Soviet chess player and dual Women's World Chess Champion.
- Dale Coogan, 58, American MLB player (Pittsburgh Pirates).
- Albert De Roocker, 85, Belgian Olympic fencer (1924, 1928).
- Charles Exbrayat, 82, French fiction writer.
- Winfried Freudenberg, 32, East German defector, gas balloon crash.
- Stuart Hamblen, 80, American singer and songwriter (This Ole House), Billy Graham crusader, brain cancer.
- Herman Kogan, 74, American journalist (Chicago Daily News, Chicago Sun-Times).
- Robert Lacoste, 90, French socialist politician, member of the National Assembly and senator.
- Chhuttan Lal Meena, 68, Indian politician, Member of Parliament.
- Stanley Wijesundera, 65, Sri Lankan professor of biochemistry, vice chancellor of the University of Colombo, assassinated.

=== 9 ===
- Kermit Beahan, 70, American officer in the U.S. Air Force, bombardier on the Bockscar atomic bomb flight, heart attack.
- André Hornez, 83, French lyricist (C'est si bon; Rien dans les mains, rien dans les poches).
- Robert Mapplethorpe, 42, American photographer, complications from AIDS.
- Sam Melville, 52, American film and television actor, heart failure.
- Sean O'Sullivan, 37, Canadian politician and Roman Catholic priest, leukemia.
- Mihemed Şêxo, 41, Kurdish folk singer.
- Hilda Strike, 78, Canadian track athlete and Olympic medalist (1932).

=== 10 ===
- Selwyn Jepson, 89, English mystery and detective author and screenwriter (Man Running).
- Maurizio Merli, 49, Italian film actor (Catene, Violent Rome), myocardial infarction.

=== 11 ===
- Joe Bartos, 62, American NFL player (Washington Redskins).
- William Challee, 84, American actor (Five Easy Pieces).
- Joseph Ferriola, 61, American mobster, boss of the Chicago Outfit, complications after heart transplant.
- Julius Hansen, 92, Danish Olympic sports shooter (1936).
- James Kee, 71, American politician, member of the U.S. House of Representatives (1965–1973).
- John J. McCloy, 93, American diplomat and presidential advisor, Assistant Secretary of War, pulmonary edema.
- Edward A. Weeks, 91, American writer, editor of The Atlantic.

=== 12 ===
- Maurice Evans, 87, English actor (Planet of the Apes), (Bewitched), heart failure.
- Jakob Gimpel, 82, Polish-born concert pianist.
- Thaddeus B. Hurd, 85, American architect and historian.
- Kiyoshi Mutō, 86, Japanese architect and structural engineer (Keio Plaza Hotel, Kasumigaseki Building).
- John Baptist Lucius Noel, 99, British mountaineer and filmmaker (1924 British Mount Everest expedition).
- Frederick Ramsden, 78, English-born Scottish cricketer.
- Chet Soda, 80, American businessman, general manager of the Oakland Raiders.
- Bill Speer, 46, Canadian NHL player (Pittsburgh Penguins, Boston Bruins).
- Carlos Terry, 32, American NBA basketballer (Washington Bullets), car accident.
- Luigi Tosi, 73, Italian actor.

=== 13 ===
- L. E. Baynes, 86, English aeronautical engineer, developed the Scud gliders.
- Carl Dahlhaus, 60, German musicologist, kidney failure.
- Salvatore Dell'Isola, 88, Italian conductor.
- Carl von Horn, 85, Swedish Army general.
- Tice James, 74, American Negro Leagues baseball player.
- Jo Mommers, 61, Dutch Olympic footballer (1952).
- Reg Mulavin, 76, Australian rules footballer.
- James G. O'Hara, 63, American soldier and politician, member of U.S. House of Representatives (1959–1977), lung cancer.
- Fahrettin Özdilek, 90–91, Turkish Army general and politician, acting Prime Minister of Turkey.

=== 14 ===
- Edward Abbey, 62, American author (The Monkey Wrench Gang, Desert Solitaire), environmentalist and anarchist, complications from surgery.
- Stephen Bechtel Sr., 88, American president of Bechtel Corporation.
- Charles Billingslea, 74, American general in the U.S. Army (Distinguished Service Cross), pneumonia.
- Chang Hsing-hsien, 79, Taiwanese Olympic athlete (1932, 1936).
- Chris Cortemeglia, 85, American NFL player (Frankford Yellow Jackets).
- Charles Roy Henderson, 77, American statistician (Best linear unbiased prediction), pioneer in animal breeding.
- Happy Humphrey, 62, American wrestler, heaviest professional wrestler of all time (364 kg), heart attack.
- Mark Kilroy, 21, American kidnapped and murdered in Mexico.
- Omar Knedlik, 72, American inventor and businessman (ICEE frozen drink).
- Timothy Meyers, 43, American actor (Grease), AIDS.
- Egon Morbitzer, 62, German violinist, concertmaster of Staatskapelle Berlin, cancer.
- Gladys Pyle, 98, American politician, U.S. Senator.
- Zita of Bourbon-Parma, 96, last Queen of Hungary and Empress of Austria, wife of Charles I.

=== 15 ===
- Henry Cass, 85, British director.
- Manlio Di Rosa, 74, Italian Olympic fencer (1936, 1948, 1952, 1956).
- Mohamed Jameel Didi, 73, Maldivian politician, Minister of Justice and Attorney General.
- Charles Schultz, 73, American NFL player (Green Bay Packers).

=== 16 ===
- Raymond Affleck, 66, Canadian architect, founder of architectural firm Arcop (Queen Elizabeth Theatre, Vancouver).
- Georges Blond, 82, French writer, sympathiser with fascism.
- Eddie Buczynski, 42, American archaeologist and follower of Wicca, parasitic infection.
- Harry Englund, 88, American NFL player (Chicago Staleys/Bears).
- Denver D. Hargis, 67, American politician, member of the United States House of Representatives (1959–1961).
- Jack Harrison, 73, Australian rules footballer.
- Pierre Huylebroeck, 66, Belgian Olympic speed skater (1948, 1952, 1956).
- Jesús María de Leizaola, 92, Spanish politician, President of the Basque government in exile.
- George Lynn, 73, American composer, conductor and pianist.
- Marcus Morris, 73, English Anglican priest, founded the Eagle weekly comic.
- Alan Redpath, 82, British-American evangelist and author.

=== 17 ===
- Adeola Aboyade-Cole, 38, Nigerian Olympic hurdler (1972).
- Beulah Ream Allen, 92, American nurse and physician, civilian physician during World War II (Medal of Freedom).
- Hemwati Nandan Bahuguna, 69, Indian politician, Chief Minister of Uttar Pradesh, consequence of surgery.
- Merritt Butrick, 29, American actor (Square Pegs), toxoplasmosis complicated by AIDS.
- Jacob Pieter Den Hartog, 87, Dutch-American mechanical engineer.
- Fred R. Haviland Jr., 73, American WWII flying ace.
- George Vernon Russell, 83, American architect in California.
- Ed Sanneman, 86, Australian rules footballer.

=== 18 ===
- Helen Beebe, 80, American teacher of the deaf and pioneer of auditory-verbal therapy.
- Walter Fedorick, 71, Canadian Olympic long-distance runner (1948).
- Harold Jeffreys, 97, British geophysicist, opponent of plate tectonics.
- Ryūzō Kikushima, 75, Japanese writer and film producer (Throne of Blood, The Hidden Fortress).
- Piet Kruiver, 51, Dutch international footballer (Feyenoord, PSV Eindhoven, Netherlands).
- George P. Mahoney, 87, American politician.
- William Olander, 38, American curator at the New Museum of Contemporary Art, AIDS.
- Werner Proft, 87, German Olympic field hockey player (1928).
- Duane Purvis, 76, American footballer and javelin thrower.
- Max Tishler, 82, American organic chemist, emphysema.

=== 19 ===
- Alan Civil, 59, British horn player (BBC Symphony Orchestra), liver and kidney failure.
- Normie Glick, 61, American NBA basketballer (Minneapolis Lakers).
- Ethel Hays, 97, American syndicated cartoonist (Raggedy Ann).
- Charles Lamb, 88, British stage, film, radio and television actor (Mrs Dale's Diary).
- Joe Malay, 83, American MLB player (New York Giants).
- Valérie Quennessen, 31, French theatre and film actress (Summer Lovers, Conan the Barbarian), car accident.
- Joe Rose, 23, Canadian LGBT rights activist, murdered.

=== 20 ===
- Fred Beattie, 79, English cricketer.
- Archie Bleyer, 79, American song arranger and bandleader (Gordon MacRae show), and founder of Cadence Records.
- Ray Cook, 52, Australian conductor, composer, and arranger.
- Alan Gifford, 78, American-born actor in the UK (2001: A Space Odyssey).
- Mogens Lüchow, 70, Danish Olympic fencer (1948, 1952).
- Francis Russell, 79, American author (Sacco-Vanzetti case).
- Dina Sfat, 50, Brazilian actress.
- Basil Whitener, 73, American politician, member of the United States House of Representatives (1957–1969).
- Per Winge, 75, Danish Olympic sports shooter (1952).

=== 21 ===
- Sneeze Achiu, 86, American NFL footballer (Dayton Triangles).
- David Cairns, 79, English Navy rear-admiral, president of the Royal Naval College, Greenwich.
- Otis Douglas, 77, American NFL footballer and coach (Philadelphia Eagles, Calgary Stampeders).
- Louis Dupree, 63, American archaeologist and anthropologist, lung cancer.
- Milton Frome, 80, American actor, congestive heart failure.
- Raymond Herbaux, 69, French Olympic weightlifter (1948).
- John Kenneth Hilliard, 87, American acoustical and electrical engineer.
- George Schlitz, 79, Australian rules footballer.

=== 22 ===
- Park Am, 64, South Korean actor.
- Vince Hamilton, 73, Australian rules footballer.
- Ann Harrison, 15, American murder victim.
- Wally Heider, 66, American recording engineer and recording studio owner.
- Russ Meredith, 91, American NFL player (Cleveland Bulldogs), and politician.
- Gino Piserchio, 44, American actor, composer and musician, AIDS.
- Peta Taylor, 76, English cricketer.

=== 23 ===
- F. W. S. Craig, 69, Scottish psephologist, suicide.
- Adrien Deschryver, 49, Belgian photographer and conservationist, chief warden of Kahuzi-Biega National Park.
- Pavle Gregorić, 96, Yugoslavian communist politician, Minister for Croatia.
- Speedo Loughran, 91, American college football and basketball player and coach.
- George Marthins, 83, Indian hockey player and gold medalist (1928).
- Bob McTaggart, 43, Scottish politician, Member of Parliament, heart attack.
- Berl Repetur, 86–87, Soviet-born Zionist activist and Israeli politician.

=== 24 ===
- Robert Arundell, 84, British diplomat, Governor of the Windward Islands and Barbados.
- Arnett Cobb, 70, American tenor saxophonist.
- Reuben David, 76, Indian zoologist, founder of Kankaria Zoo.
- Charles Gardetto, 85, Monegasque Olympic rower (1928).
- Edward P. Hurt, 89, American football, basketball and track coach.
- St. Julien R. Marshall, 85, American officer in the U.S. Marine Corps, cardiopulmonary arrest.
- Ivan Sharp, 79, Australian rules footballer.

=== 25 ===
- Sa'id Mufti, 90, Jordanian politician, Prime Minister of Jordan.
- C. L. Anandan, 55, Indian actor and producer (Vijayapuri Veeran).
- Reginald LeBorg, 86, Austrian film director (San Diego, I Love You), heart attack.

=== 26 ===
- Albert Guérisse, 77, Belgian general and resistance leader.
- Māris Liepa, 52, Latvian ballet dancer
- Marina Ried, 67, Russian-German stage and film actress.
- Asbjørn Ruud, 69, Norwegian Olympic ski jumper (1948).
- Lewis William Walt, 76, United States Marine Corps four-star general.
- Harry Wicks, 83, British socialist activist (Communist Party of Great Britain).
- Hai Zi, 25, Chinese poet, suicide.

=== 27 ===
- May Allison, 98, American stage and silent screen actress (David Harum), respiratory failure.
- Don Basham, 62, Bible teacher and author.
- Malcolm Cowley, 90, American writer, heart attack.
- Scott Safran, 21, American video gamer, set world-record score on Asteroids, fall from building.
- Cláudio Santoro, 69, Brazilian composer, conductor and violinist.
- Jack Starrett, 52, American actor and film director (Blazing Saddles, First Blood), kidney failure.
- Sam Tsoutsouvas, 71, American NFL player (Detroit Lions).

=== 28 ===
- Joseph Adefarasin, 67, Nigerian lawyer and High Court judge.
- Nick Bremigan, 43, American Major League baseball umpire (American League), heart attack.
- Fang Chih, 93, Chinese politician, diplomat, author and Kuomintang official.
- William D. Cox, 79, American businessman and sports executive (Philadelphia Phillies, International Soccer League).
- Ian Dalrymple, 85, British screenwriter, film director and producer (The Lion Has Wings, The Wooden Horse).
- Richard H. Ellis, 69, United States Air Force general, commander in chief of the Strategic Air Command.
- Josiah Zion Gumede, 69, president of unrecognised state of Zimbabwe Rhodesia.
- Arthur Hill, 94, Irish peer, Marquess of Downshire.
- Madeleine Ozeray, 80, Belgian stage and film actress, cancer.
- Patrick Vallençant, 42, French alpinist and skier, pioneer in ski mountaineering, abseiling accident.
- Lockwood West, 83, British actor, cancer.
- Robert J. Wilke, 74, American film and television actor.

=== 29 ===
- Abdullah al-Ahdal, Imam of Belgium, shot.
- Bernard Blier, 73, Argentina-born French actor.
- Chico Che, 43, Mexican musician, singer and songwriter, stroke.
- Fernand Gambiez, 86, French Army general.
- Aleksandr Prokopenko, 35, Belarusian international footballer (Dinamo Minsk, Soviet Union), choked on food.
- Xiao Jinguang, 86, Chinese fleet admiral, Commander of People's Liberation Army Navy, colon cancer.
- Nicolae Steinhardt, 76, Romanian writer and Orthodox monk.
- Charles Taylor, 78, English businessman and politician, Member of Parliament.

=== 30 ===
- Bill Chappell, 67, American politician, member of the U.S. House of Representatives (1969–1989), bone cancer.
- Peter D'Aguiar, 76–77, Guyanese-Portuguese businessman and politician, Minister of Finance.
- Mary Heaton, 78, British Olympic gymnast (1936).
- Mike Sekowsky, 65, American comics artist (Wonder Woman).
- Arto Tolsa, 43, Finnish international footballer (Beerschot, KTP, Finland).
- Huang Wei, 85, Chinese Nationalist military general.

=== 31 ===
- Hugh Alessandroni, 81, American Olympic fencer (1932, 1936).
- Edgar C. Erickson, 92, United States Army major general, Chief of the National Guard Bureau.
- Stan Penberthy, 82, Australian rules footballer.
- Francis H. Russell, 84, American diplomat, U.S. Ambassador to Tunisia, Ghana and New Zealand, heart attack.
- Millard Sheets, 81, American artist and architectural designer.
- Carlos Tobalina, 63–64, Peruvian-born American adult filmmaker and actor, suicide.

=== Unknown date ===
- Juliette Compton, 89, American actress (That Hamilton Woman).
- Michael Lubbock, 82, British military officer and businessman.
- Allan H. Mogensen, 87, American industrial engineer.
- Yoshio Shiga, 88, member of the Japanese Communist Party.
