= Ruzhyn =

Ruzhyn (Ukrainian: Ружин) may refer to:

- Ruzhyn Raion, a raion (district) of Zhytomyr Oblast, Ukraine
  - Ruzhyn (urban-type settlement), administrative district of Ruzhyn Raion
- Ruzhyn, Volyn Oblast, Turiisk Raion, Volyn Oblast, Ukraine
- Ruzhin (Hasidic dynasty)
