= Follow Alana =

- 愛遊台灣
- Genre: Travel Show
- Created by: Aurora Digital Media Co. Ltd.
- Country of origin: Taiwan
- Original language: English/Mandarin
- No. of seasons: 6

Production
- Producer: Alana Nichols
- Production locations: Taiwan, United States
- Running time: 30 minutes

Original release
- Network: TVBS/ONTV/CTI/CETV/ChannelNewsAsia
- Release: May 2017 – present

Follow Alana is a travel television show hosted by Alana Nichols, and produced by Aurora Digital Media.

== History ==
Debuting in 2017, the show tracks Alana - born profoundly deaf and effectively communicates with the assistance of a cochlear implant and Auditory-Verbal Therapy, on her worldwide travel adventures. In the show, Alana introduces diverse sceneries, lifestyles, cultures, and cuisines of various destinations, encouraging the audience to build a loving and sustainable relationship with the environment. The show also features celebrity personalities such as Roger Federer. The show has been broadcast on television in Taiwan, and can also be found on various platforms online including 'mini-episodes' on YouTube.

The show has won Remi Winner of 2018 Worldfest-Houston International Film Festival and was nominated by 2018 New York Festivals International Television & Film Awards.

Beginning March 19, 2021, the show became available on both Apple TV and Google Play in North America. It is also available on numerous other online platforms and broadcast television channels throughout Asia, including China, Taiwan, and Singapore. Prior to its US debut, Fodor's travel guide named Alana, "the definition of #travelinspiration" and described the show as, "the most wholesome travel show you didn't know you needed."

Follow Alana has won a number of television awards, including the 2020 Bronze and Silver Remi Awards at the Worldfest-Houston International Film Festival and was also a finalist at the New York International Television & Film Festival Awards in 2018.

== Episodes ==
All seasons below are for the Taiwan version. Season 6 was released in the US as Season 1, under the name "Follow Alana : Switzerland." Season 5 was released in the US as Season 2, under the name "Follow Alana: Australia."

=== Season 1 ===
Episode	Title
1	Row, Row Your Boat
2	Sleep Under the Stars
3	An Ideal Life
4	Old Things New Look
5	From Different Angles to See the World
6	Camping Together
7	Guarding Our Forest
8	Ways to Preserve
9	Close to the Land
10	Perseverance
11	Sip a Natural Tea
12	The Taste of Adventure
13	Pass On

=== Season 2 ===
Episode	Title
1	More than Just a Furry Friend- It's Dr. Dog!
2	Me & the Horse
3	Spring Days of Ali Mountain
4	Leave No Trace
5	Charm of an Old Town
6	Viva Green Energy!
7	Island Hopping - Xiao Liu Qiu
8	Island Hopping - Beigan
9	Island Hopping - Nangan
10	Island Hopping - Discovering the Main Islands of Penghu
11	Island Hopping - Discovering the Small Islands of Penghu
12	Island Hopping - Walking around Green Island
13	Island Hopping - Swimming around Green Island

=== Season 3 ===
Episode	Title
1	Let's go look for cats in Houdong!
2	The Charm of Mountain Climbing
3	Challenges of the Mother Nature
4	Kayaking in Toushe Basin
5	Sleepover in an Aquarium
6	Falling for Waterfalls
7	An Ecological Tour in Sheding Community
8	Travel with Low Carbon Footprints
9	Hi! Mermaid!
10	Observe Eagles
11	A Treacherous Journey, a Warm Reward
12	Into the Wild - Shuiyang Forest
13	Team Work, Build the Work
14	Aye-Aye captain

=== Season 4 ===
Episode	Title
1	Animals We Love - Adopt a Dog
2	Animals We Love - Working Dogs
3	Journey to the Cave
4	Animals We Love - Saving the Frog Prince
5	Two Ways of Railway
6	Palettes of Maolin
7	Walk Along Alangyi
8	Animals We Love - Batman
9	The Charms of Kinmen
10	Animals We Love - Turtle Miracle
11	Go with the Flow
12	Drifting through Tainan
13	The City of Wind

=== Season 5 (aka Follow Alana: Australia, Season 2 in the USA) ===
Episode	Title (Taiwan Version)	Title (USA Version)
1	First Encounter with Brisbane	Exploring the Old City
2	Exploring New Heights	Brisbane from the Sky
3	I Try, I Fly, I Slide	Jetting through the Gold Coast
4	Wild Interaction	The Natural Side of Gold Coast
5	A Trip Down Alana's Memory Lane	Hopping to Moreton Island
6	Moreton Island: Sunday Getaway	Moreton Island from the Sea
7	Moreton Island: Under the Sea	Whitsunday Island
8	G'Day on the Farm	Great Barrier Reef Above and Below
9	Whitehaven Beach: A White Heaven	Lady Elliot
10	Spending a Night on the Great Barrier Reef	Heading North to Cairns
11	Lady Elliot Island: What a Lady!	Wet and Wild in the Mountains!
12	Wild Adventures, Wild Creatures	Skyrail to the Rainforest
13	Jumping into the Dream	
14	Into the Rainforest	

=== Season 6 (aka Follow Alana: Switzerland, Season 1 in the USA) ===
Episode	Title (Taiwan Version)	Title (USA Version)
1	A Swiss Getaway	A Swiss Getaway
2	Golden Round Trip	Golden Round Trip
3	Skyline Walk	Skyline Walk
4	The Story Behind Heidi	The Story Behind Heidi
5	An Inspiring Encounter	An Inspiring Encounter
6	Follow the Water Trails	Follow the Water Trails
7	Glacier Paradise	Glacier Paradise
8	Glacier Express Rail Trip	Italian Flavor & Swiss Efficiency
9	Italian Flavor x Swizz Efficiency	Swiss Cheese
10	Swiss Cheese	Beauty of an Ancient Town
11	Beauty of an Ancient Town	Swiss Made
12	Alana & Llama	Horse Festival
13	The Wood Carving Town	Happy Birthday Switzerland
14	Swiss Made	
15	An Inspiring Encounter	
16	The Horse Festival	
17	Happy Birthday Switzerland	

== Availability ==
- USA - Apple TV, Google Play and on demand from streaming video provider Choco TV.
- Switzerland - AppleTV, Google Play, Tubi, Plex, Crackle, LocalNow, Glewed
- Australia - AppleTV, GooglePlay
- Limited episodes are also available on both Eva Air and China Airlines.

Previously, the show was broadcast on TVBS and CITI in Taiwan.

== Awards ==
Award	Year	Category
New York Festivals Television & Film Awards	2018	Lifestyle Program
Worldfest-Huston International Film Festival	2018	Remi Winner
Asian Television Awards	2018	Lifestyle Program Finalist Best Direction (Non-fiction) Finalist
New York Festivals Television & Film Awards	2019	Lifestyle Program
The Indie Fest Film Awards	2019	Awards of Merit February 2019
Telly Awards	2019	Nature/Wildlife Category Bronze Award Travel Category Silver Award
Golden Bell Awards	2019	Best Lifestyle Program Nominee
Asian Television Awards	2019	Best Entertainment Host/Presenter
Worldfest - Houston International Film Festival	2020	Silver & Brozen Remi Award
Telly Awards	2020	Travel/Tourism & Natural/Wildlife Silver and bronze winner
Golden Bell Awards	2020	Best lifestyle program host
New York Festivals TV & Film Awards	2020	Best Lifestyle Program
