= Archibald McLardie (footballer, born 1889) =

Scottish footballer

Personal information
- Date of birth: 1889
- Place of birth: Paisley, Scotland
- Date of death: 25 December 1915 (aged 26)
- Place of death: near Krithia, Ottoman Turkey
- Position: Outside forward

Senior career*
Years	Team	Apps	(Gls)
- John Neilson Institution FP
	Queen's Park	0	(0)
1910–1912	St Mirren	5	(0)
- * Club domestic league appearances and goals

Archibald McLardie (1889 – 25 December 1915) was a Scottish professional footballer who played in the Scottish League for St Mirren as an outside forward.

== Personal life ==
McLardie attended John Neilson Institution, Paisley Grammar School, University of Glasgow and later worked for McLay, Murray & Speirs in Glasgow and as a lawyer for the Carron Company in Falkirk. On 5 June 1915, ten months after the outbreak of the First World War, McLardie was commissioned into the Argyll and Sutherland Highlanders as a second lieutenant. Prior to the war, he had served as a territorial with the Cameronians (Scottish Rifles). McLardie was serving at Gallipoli when he was killed by shellfire near Krithia Nullah on 25 December 1915. He was buried at Pink Farm Cemetery.

== Career statistics ==
Appearances and goals by club, season and competition
Club	Season	League			National Cup		Total	
Club	Season	Division	Apps	Goals	Apps	Goals	Apps	Goals
St Mirren	1910–11	Scottish First Division	3	0	0	0	3	0
St Mirren	1911–12	Scottish First Division	2	0	0	0	2	0
Career total			5	0	0	0	5	0
