= Auditory Verbal UK =

UK charity

Auditory Verbal UK (AVUK) is a charity that delivers auditory-verbal therapy (AVT) to deaf babies and children aged 0–5 years to enable them to listen and talk.

AVUK was founded in 2003 by Jacqueline Stokes in Oxfordshire to provide AVTs for families in the UK. The charity has a training programme, short courses, in-service training and webinars. The charity has two centres; one in Bicester, Oxfordshire, and one in Bermondsey, London. And also provides telepractice sessions.

In 2020, AVUK was chosen from more than 400 charities as one of 10 recipients of the 2020 GSK IMPACT Awards.
