= Robert Wilson (cricketer, born 1935) =

Scottish cricketer and physician

Personal information
- Born: 12 February 1935; Paisley, Renfrewshire, Scotland
- Died: April 1987 (aged 52); Maidstone, Kent, England
- Batting: Left-handed
- Bowling: Slow left-arm orthodox

Domestic team information
- Years: Team
- 1955–1956: Scotland

Career statistics
Competition	First-class
Matches	3
Runs scored	64
Batting average	12.80
100s/50s	–/–
Top score	29
Catches/stumpings	3/–
- Source: Cricinfo, 4 July 2022

Robert Wilson (12 February 1935 — April 1987) was a Scottish first-class cricketer.

Wilson was born at Edinburgh in April 1916 and was educated at Paisley Grammar School. A club cricketer for Kelburne Cricket Club, Wilson made his debut for Scotland in first-class cricket against Ireland at Dublin in 1955. He made a further two first-class appearances for Scotland, against Derbyshire in the same year at Edinburgh, and against Yorkshire at Hull on Scotland's 1956 tour of England. Playing as a batsman in the Scottish side, Wilson scored 64 runs as an opening batsman, at an average of 12.80 and a highest score of 29. Wilson died in April 1987 in England at Maidstone, Kent.
