= Paisley Grammar School =

Location
- Glasgow Road; Paisley, Renfrewshire, PA1 3RP; Scotland; 55.8463°N 4.4115°W

Information
- Established: 1576; 450 years ago
- Local authority: Renfrewshire Council
- Head teacher: Janice Levens
- Staff: 100 staff
- Gender: Coeducational
- Enrolment: 1,400
- Houses: Mull, Skye, Iona, Lewis
- Colour
- Publication: The Grammarian
- Website: http://www.paisleygrammarschool.com

Paisley Grammar School is a secondary school in Paisley, the largest town in Renfrewshire, Scotland. The school was founded in 1576 by royal charter of King James VI and is situated on Glasgow Road. The school is recognised as one of Scotland's oldest schools with an established history.

The present school building (which was called the 'Paisley Grammar School and William B. Barbour Academy' due to a bequest by the former member of parliament for Paisley, William B. Barbour, and until recently was the school's proper title) was opened in 1898 by Lord Balfour of Burleigh, then Secretary of State for Scotland.

The school was fee paying until the mid-1960s and in 1988, when threatened with imminent closure by Strathclyde Regional Council, Prime Minister Margaret Thatcher intervened personally to ensure the survival of the school. The law was changed so that local councils could no longer close schools which were more than 80% full without approval by the Secretary of State for Scotland.

Following a consultation, in January 2021, Renfrewshire Council approved plans for the school to be moved to a new site, approving construction of a Paisley Grammar School Community Campus at the old site of the Chivas Brothers Whiskey Distillery. The new community campus will move pupils and staff to a modern facility with outdoor areas, state-of-the-art technology, and high-quality media, drama and sports facilities not possible on the current site. The new school will neighbour West College Scotland’s Paisley Campus on Renfrew Road.

== Notable former pupils ==
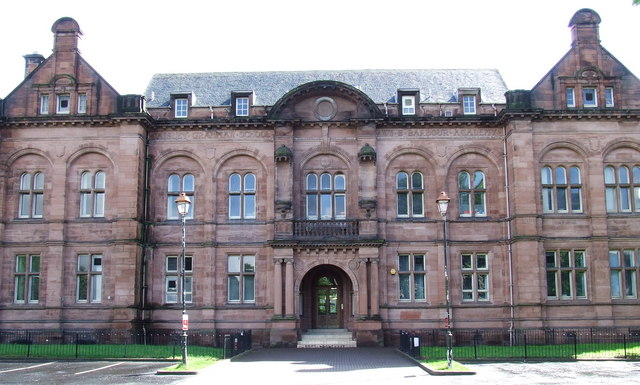
Paisley Grammar School.

Notable former pupils include:

- John Amabile – interior designer and TV presenter.
- Agnes Barr Auchencloss – medical officer
- Michael Barratt – television presenter and announcer.
- Colin Campbell – former Member of the Scottish Parliament (SNP).
- James Carlile (1795–1841) – Irish Commissioner of National Education.
- Sir William Cockburn (1891–1957) – banker and cricketer.
- Thomas Gibson (1915–1993) – plastic surgeon and bioengineer.
- Fred Goodwin – former CEO of Royal Bank of Scotland.
- Peter Howitt (1970) – actor and film writer/director.
- Omer Hussain – Scottish cricket internationalist.
- Kenny Ireland (1945–2014) – theatre director & actor, notable for his role as "Donald" in ITV's Benidorm.
- John Jackson (1887–1958) – astronomer.
- Jacqui Lait (née Harkness) – former member of parliament (Conservative) and first ever female Conservative Party Whip.
- Matthew Leishman – Moderator of the General Assembly of the Church of Scotland in 1858.
- Alexander Munro MacRobert (1873–1930) – former Lord Advocate and member of parliament (Conservative).
- Kyle Magennis – professional footballer.
- Jim Mather – former Member of the Scottish Parliament (SNP).
- Lord McEwan – former Judge in Scottish Court of Session and High Court of Justiciary.
- Ann McKechin – Member of Parliament (Labour) for Glasgow North (2001–2015).
- Archibald McLardie (1889–1915) – lawyer and footballer.
- John Macquarrie (1919–2007) – sometime Lady Margaret Professor of Divinity, University of Oxford, and Canon Residentiary, Christ Church, Oxford.
- Andrew Neil – journalist and broadcaster.
- David Nish – Chief Executive of Standard Life plc.
- Frederick Ramsden – cricketer
- Scott Reid – actor (Still Game)
- Brian Reid – former professional footballer.
- Andrew Robertson – former president of the Montreal Board of Trade etc.
- Ian Smart - solicitor and former president of the Law Society of Scotland.
- David Stow (1793–1864) – educationalist.
- Alan C Surgenor (Merchant Navy, Marine Engineer)
- Andrew Symington, (1785–1853) - Presbyterian minister
- David Tennant – actor, (Doctor Who, Broadchurch, Jessica Jones etc.)
- Tom Urie – actor and musician.
- Frank Walker (1897–1949) – Scottish footballer.
- Frank Arneil Walker – Emeritus Professor of Architecture at Strathclyde University.
- John Wilson (Scottish writer)
- John Wilson – Canadian children's author.
- Robert Wilson – cricketer.
- Kenyon Wright – former chairman of the Scottish Constitutional Convention.
- Lord Wylie (1923–2005) – former Lord Advocate and former member of parliament (Scottish Unionist Party).

== Old Grammarians ==
The Old Grammarians Club is a society formed by and for former pupils and staff of Paisley Grammar School. The club has been running in some form since 1928 and was founded with a need to 'keep in touch' after school years following world war I.

Ross Brisco is the current president who was elected to office in 2018.

The club are committed to organising social gatherings throughout the year including a yearly ball and a golf club with yearly tournament. The Old Grammarians Club also contributes to the school's annual prize-giving; giving the Old Grammarians Prize to one pupil in the sixth year.

== See also ==
- List of the oldest schools in the United Kingdom
