= Robert Kenedi =

Prof Robert Maximilian Kenedi FRSE (1921-1998) was a Hungarian-born engineer and bioengineer.

== Life ==
He was born in Hungary on 19 March 1921.

In 1938 he left Hungary to study in Britain, choosing the Royal Technical College in Glasgow where he studied civil engineering, receiving his degree (BSc) from Glasgow University in 1941. As a foreign national from an enemy country, the Second World War eventually impacted upon him. He was obliged to serve two years within the Auxiliary War Service. This was somewhat similar to being a prisoner of war but is likely to have involved unpaid farm labour, rather than internment. Following appeal he was released from these duties in 1943. He then returned to the Royal Technical College to lecture in Civil and Mechanical Engineering. During his first ten years he mainly worked on studies on the strength of materials and strain gauge technology, especially in thin-walled materials. During this period he developed a series of highly used Design Codes for the British steel industry, allowing great refinement of sections. The university awarded him a doctorate (PhD) in 1949.

In the 1950s he combined forces with Prof Tom Gibson a Glasgow plastic surgeon, to apply his engineering knowledge to human cell structure. They began an internationally renowned programme of biological tissue mechanics. In 1963, with the help of a large grant from the British Medical Research Council, he founded the Bioengineering Unit at Strathclyde University. The university appointed Kenedi a professorship and made him Head of the unit. A further grant from the Wolfson Foundation allowed the creation of the Wolfson Centre within the unit. The unit then broadened its range of study, involving prosthetics and artificial organs. This led to the creation of the National Centre for Prosthetics and Orthotics in Strathclyde. In 1965 he was elected a Fellow of the Royal Society of Edinburgh. His proposers were Anthony Elliot Ritchie, Peter Pauson, Donald Pack, and Adam Tomson.

In 1980 he left Strathclyde to go to Hong Kong Polytechnic for four years.

In 1982 he was awarded the Herbert R Lissner Biomedical Engineering Award by the American Society of Mechanical Engineers.

He died at home in Milngavie on 7 September 1998. He was survived by his wife Jean.

== Publications ==
- Perspectives in Biomedical Engineering (1973)
