= Thomas Gibson (surgeon) =

Scottish physician and medical researcher (1915–1993)

Prof Thomas Gibson FRSE (1915-1993) was an eminent Scottish plastic surgeon serving as professor of plastic surgery and bioengineering at Strathclyde University. Together with Robert Kenedi he cofounding the Bioengineering Department in 1961. His research forms the basis for modern tissue transplantation techniques. In 1960 Sir Peter Medawar wrote to Gibson giving "deep obligation" to him for paving the way for his understanding which led to Medawar being awarded the Nobel Prize in Medicine in 1960. His letter ended "thank God I was lucky enough to team up with you".

== Life ==
He was born in Kilbarchan in Renfrewshire on 24 November 1915, the son of Thomas Gibson and his wife, Mary Munn. He attended the parish school in Kilbarchan and then Paisley Grammar School. He then studied medicine at Glasgow University graduating MB ChB in 1938. His career (as most) was interrupted by the Second World War during which he served in the Royal Army Medical Corps where he served in northern Europe. After the war he served as Commanding Officer of the Maxillofacial Unit in India until 1947, specialising in major facial reconstruction from wounds and burns. He took special interest in the "shock phase" following major burns.

In 1947 he returned to Scotland as a Consultant Plastic Surgeon. From 1970 he was director of the West of Scotland Plastic and Oral Surgery Service (based first at Glasgow Royal Infirmary then at Ballochmyle and Canniesburn), at the same time becoming professor of plastic surgery and bioengineering at Strathclyde University. He was president of the British Association of Plastic Surgeons 1970-71 .

In 1976 he was elected a Fellow of The Royal Society of Edinburgh. His proposers were Peter Pauson, Robert Kenedi, Sir Andrew Kay, Sir Samuel Curran and Sir Adam Thomson. He served as president of the Royal College of Physicians and Surgeons of Glasgow 1976-78. He retired in 1980, and as a late honour in life he was awarded the Lister Medal in 1987 for services to facial reconstruction.

He died in Glasgow Western Infirmary on 13 February 1993 following a short illness.

== Publications ==
- Modern Trends in Plastic Surgery (chapter on Tissue Repair and Transplantion) (1964)

He edited the British Journal of Plastic Surgery 1969-1970

== Family ==
In 1944 he married Patricia Muriel McFeat. They had two sons, two daughters and eleven grandchildren.
