= Helen Beebe =

American educationist (1909–1989)

- Born: Helen Louise Hulick Beebe; December 27, 1908; Easton, Pennsylvania, US
- Died: March 18, 1989 (aged 80)
- Education: Wellesley College; Clarke School for the Deaf (PhD)
- Occupation: Teacher
- Known for: Auditory-verbal therapy

Helen Louise Hulick Beebe (December 27, 1908 – March 18, 1989) was an American educator and pioneer of auditory-verbal therapy. In 1938, she made headlines when a judge jailed her for wearing trousers while appearing as a witness in court.

== Biography ==
Helen Hulick was born in 1908 in Easton, Pennsylvania, where she lived most of her life. She attended Wellesley College from 1927 to 1929, and received her PhD in 1930 from the Clarke School for the Deaf in Northampton, Massachusetts.

She taught in deaf schools in Oregon and California before returning to the East Coast in 1942.

In 1938, while living in California, she was called as a witness in the trial of two men accused of burgling her home. The judge disapproved of her wearing trousers instead of a dress, and ordered her to return 'properly attired'. When she returned still wearing pants, the judge jailed her for contempt. The case attracted substantial public attention, with hundreds of protest letters sent to the courthouse. She was released from jail on her own recognizance upon booking, and an appellate court overturned the contempt citation four days later. A 2014 retrospective said she "made Los Angeles court history — and struck a blow for women’s fashion".

In 1942, she moved to New York, where she studied with the Viennese speech therapist and psychologist Emil Fröschels, and got to know the unisensory method. This began a twenty-year collaboration with Fröschels. Following his death in 1972, she continued to develop and disseminate his technique, now known as the auditory-verbal approach, while studying speech therapy at Columbia University.

She founded her Easton practice, later the Helen Beebe Speech and Hearing Center, in 1944 and served as its director for forty years. In 1950, she was able to present her philosophy at the congress of the International Association of Logopedics and Phoniatrics (IALP) in Amsterdam.

In 1972, the Larry Jarret Memorial Foundation was established by a small group of parents of their students, to promote Beebe's method of unisensory training and make it available to all hearing impaired children. Beebe donated her private practice to the foundation in 1978. It later became the Helen Beebe Speech and Hearing Center, a not-for-profit organization. In the early 1980s, the practice moved into a new building that included the clinic and Larry Jarret House, where parents were taught how to use the method at home. Many families came from Europe and South America for a week of intensive training.

Beebe was active in various specialist groups, and was an honorary member of the American Speech and Hearing Association. She was co-founder and first president of Auditory-Verbal International (AVI) (since 2005, the AG Bell Academy for Listening and Spoken Language), which promoted the auditory-verbal approach, and which trains teachers worldwide. She was a director of the Alexander Graham Bell Association for the Deaf and the Foundation for Children's Hearing, Education and Research. She died of heart failure on March 18, 1989, at Easton Hospital in Pennsylvania.

== Work ==
Beebe was a pioneer of the "unisensory approach" developed by Fröschels, now known as the auditory-verbal approach. She wrote many newspaper articles and spread her knowledge and experiences through lectures and lectures all over the world. She was firmly convinced that deaf children with residual hearing - regardless of how little it was - develop a spoken language with natural intonation.

In her 1953 book, A Guide to Help the Severely Hard of Hearing Child, she wrote:

Lip reading should be avoided as much as possible at home and in therapy. Otherwise the child would become dependent on lip reading and not use their hearing.

She started her practice for deaf children at home with a single student, Mardie Crannell Younglof who was deaf from birth. Younglof was fitted with one of the first wearable miniature electron tube-hearing aids (vacuum-tube hearing aid), which came on the market in the 1940s. Before that, Younglof's mother had spoken to her daughter all day through a rubber tube with a funnel attached to one end and earplugs attached to the other.

Beebe kept a diary for each child, in which the parents also made their entries. In this way, she was able to quickly get an idea of what the child and the child’s parents needed. Each child came to therapy with their diary, from which Beebe could see what the child had learned at home since the last therapy session.

Another pioneering act was that she invited young teachers to her therapy center, where they taught about fifty students from babies to teenagers. Deaf students had individual therapy twice a week, which enabled them to attend mainstream school with their hearing peers. Beebe used hearing aids to accustom children to speech through the ear, before they could become solely dependent on sign language, lip reading or visual signals.

In a 1983 interview, one of her former Deaf students, David Davis, stated that he could only have graduated from Harvard University because he was able to study at Beebe's Center as a young child. Beebe had taught him how to distinguish tones and how to respond to them. It was, according to Davis, a mental process that included logic and rational thinking. He learned the language one step at a time.

In 1985, Lafayette College awarded Beebe an honorary doctorate in Human Sciences for her life's work as a teacher, scientist and pioneer of auditory-verbal therapy.

== Selected publications ==
- A Guide to Help the Severely Hard of Hearing Child, Verlag S.Karger Dezember 1953, ISBN 3-8055-1759-9.
- with Deso A. Weiss: The Chewing Approach in speech and voice therapy Verlag Karger Basel; New York 1951

== External sources ==
- The New York Times vom 22. März 1989: Nachruf für Helen H. Beebe
- AG Bell: Helen Beebes Vermächtnis
- Helen Beebe, 80; Hailed For Work With Deaf Children
- Helen Beebe, Nachruf und Biografie
- Alexander Graham Bell Association - Helen Beebe's Legacy
- Alexander Graham Bell Association - David Davis: Remembering Beebe, 2014
