= Frank Arneil Walker =

Scottish architectural academic and writer

Frank Arneil Walker OBE is a Scottish architectural academic and writer. He is emeritus professor of architecture of the University of Strathclyde, having retired in 2003.

== Career ==
Walker was educated at Paisley Grammar School. He studied at the Glasgow School of Art and then worked in practice for around ten years.

He was a lecturer in Architecture and building science at the University of Strathclyde, and was involved in a cultural exchange programme with Czechoslovakia, taking a trip there in 1977. He retired from the university in 2003, becoming an emeritus professor.

== Author ==
He has written regularly on architectural and urban history, is author of The South Clyde Estuary, and co-author of The North Clyde Estuary and Central Glasgow in the Royal Incorporation of Architects in Scotland series of handbooks on Scottish architecture.

He is also a contributor to the Buildings of Scotland series, having written Argyll and Bute and co-written the Stirling and Central Scotland and Lanarkshire and Renfrewshire volumes. The Argyll and Bute volume took seven years to write and was first published in 2000. Mousa to Mackintosh was published in 2023. It was shortlisted for the Research Award at the 2023 Saltire Society Literary Awards.

== Awards an honours ==
Walker was made Officer of the Order of the British Empire (OBE) in the 2002 New Year Honours for services to architectural history and conservation.
