= Ruzhyn Raion =

Former subdivision of Zhytomyr Oblast, Ukraine

Ruzhyn Raion Ружинський район
- Raion
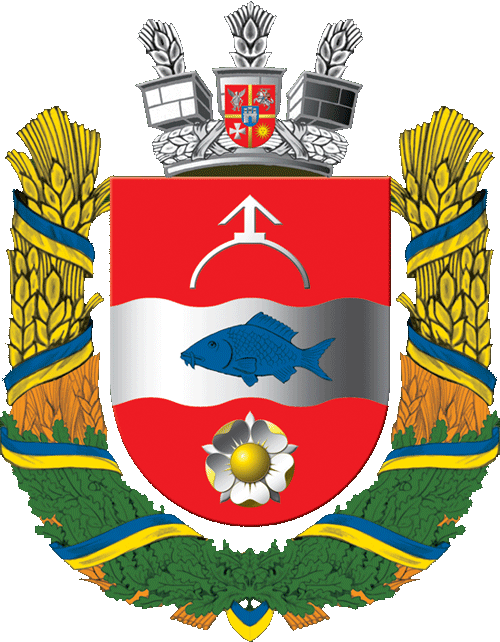
- Flag Coat of arms

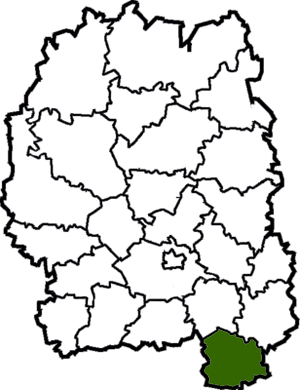
- Coordinates: 49°43′24″N 29°13′38″E
- Country: Ukraine
- Oblast: Zhytomyr Oblast
- Disestablished: 19 July 2020
- Admin. center: Ruzhyn
- Subdivisions: List: 0 — city councils; 1 — settlement councils; — rural councils; Number of localities: 0 — cities; 1 — urban-type settlements; — villages; — rural settlements

Area
  - Total: 1,002 km^{2} (387 sq mi)

Population (2020)
  - Total: 25,520 ▼
  - Density: 25.47/km^{2} (65.96/sq mi)
- Time zone: UTC+02:00 (EET)
  - Summer (DST): UTC+03:00 (EEST)
- Area code: +380

Ruzhyn Raion (Ukrainian: Ружинський район) was a raion (district) of Zhytomyr Oblast, northern Ukraine. Its administrative centre was located at Ruzhyn. The raion covered an area of 1,002 square kilometres (387 mi^{2}). The raion was abolished on 19 July 2020 as part of the administrative reform of Ukraine, which reduced the number of raions of Zhytomyr Oblast to four. The area of Ruzhyn Raion was merged into Berdychiv Raion. The last estimate of the raion population was 25,520 (2020 est.)
