= Jack Harrison (Australian footballer) =

Australian rules footballer, born 1915

Personal information
- Full name: John Edgar Harrison
- Born: 17 October 1915; Glen Huntly, Victoria
- Died: 16 March 1989 (aged 73); Box Hill, Victoria
- Original team: Prahran Districts

Playing career^{1}
Years	Club	Games (Goals)
1933, 1936	Melbourne	3 (2)
1935–38	Oakleigh (VFA)	53 (130)
1939–47	North Melbourne	92 (20)
- ^{1} Playing statistics correct to the end of 1947.

John Edgar Harrison (17 October 1915 – 16 March 1989) was an Australian rules footballer who played with Melbourne and North Melbourne in the Victorian Football League (VFL).
