= Patrick Vallençant =

French alpinist/skier

Personal information
- Born: 9 June 1946 Lyon, France
- Died: 28 March 1989 (aged 42)

Sport
- Sport: Skiing
Medal record
Representing France

Patrick Vallençant (9 June 1946 – 28 March 1989) was a French alpinist/skier and pioneer in ski mountaineering.

He was a pioneer in ski mountaineering and leader of the French school of ski mountaineers. His motto was: "si tu tombes, tu meurs", translated as "you fall, you die". In addition to numerous first descents, he was responsible for the creation of the "Pedal-Jump Turn" and co-founded the Degré 7 ski apparel company.

He died on 28 March 1989, in a non-skiing related climbing accident as a result of a broken carabiner, while abseiling from the top of La Beaume Rouge, in France.

== Skiing ==
Vallençant became known for a number of first descents on skis within the French Alps that had previously been considered too steep to ski. To achieve this he developed a ski technique known as the "Pedal-Jump Turn". His feats required him to first climb the mountain in order to make the descent on skis, at the time it was uncommon to use helicopters to reach the top. His climbing and skiing partner for many of these first descents was Anselme Baud. In achieving this he took up the mantel of Sylvain Saudan ("Le Skieur de l'Impossible") (French Wiki, Sylvain Saudan) and was a contemporary of other French extreme skiers, such as Jean-Marc Boivin and Bruno Gouvy.

Year	Location	Descent	Comments
1971		North face of the Grande Casse and the couloir des Italians	1st descent
1971		North Face of the Tour Ronde	1st descent
1972		North face of the Courtes	with Marie-Jo
1973	French Alps	Couloir en Y on the Aiguille d'Argentière	with Marie-Jo
1973	French Alps	Couturier couloir at l’Aiguille Verte	2nd descent, with Anselme Baud
1973	French Alps	Couloir Whymper on the Aiguille Verte	2nd descent, with Anselme Baud
1977	French Alps	Arête de Peuterey	1st descent, with Anselme Baud, filmed
1978	Peru	South-west side of Huascaran South (6750 m)	
1979	Peru	South-east side of Artesonraju	
1979	Peru	First ascents/descents in the White Cordillera	
1979	Peru	West Side of Yerupaja (6630 m)	Slopes of over 65 Degrees skied
1985(?)	Peru	Mt Huascaran	with Jean Marc Boivin, filmed

== Pedal-Jump Turn ==
To cope with skiing the steep terrain (greater than 50 degrees), Vallençant developed a new turning technique, known as the "Pedal-Jump Turn" (also "Pedal Hop Turn" and "Pedal Step Turn"). The technique involved pushing off from the uphill ski, away from the slope and completing a portion of turn's rotation while in the air and then landing back on the downhill ski. With the advent of parabolic skis, using the uphill ski to initiate a turn is now a common technique for carved turns and racing. The key difference is in carving or racing the skier is traveling much faster, the terrain is not as steep and there is no need for such a dramatic thrust off the slope. The "Pedal-Jump Turn" was originally developed on traditional racing skis.

== Professional ==
Patrick Vallençant founded the Stages Vallençant in Chamonix to teach extreme skiing and co-founded the "Degré 7" ski apparel company in 1983 with Iingrid Buchner, a stylist. He sold his share in Degré 7 in 1988.
