= Ruzhyn, Zhytomyr Oblast =

Rural settlement in Zhytomyr Oblast, Ukraine

Ruzhyn Ружин
- Rural settlement
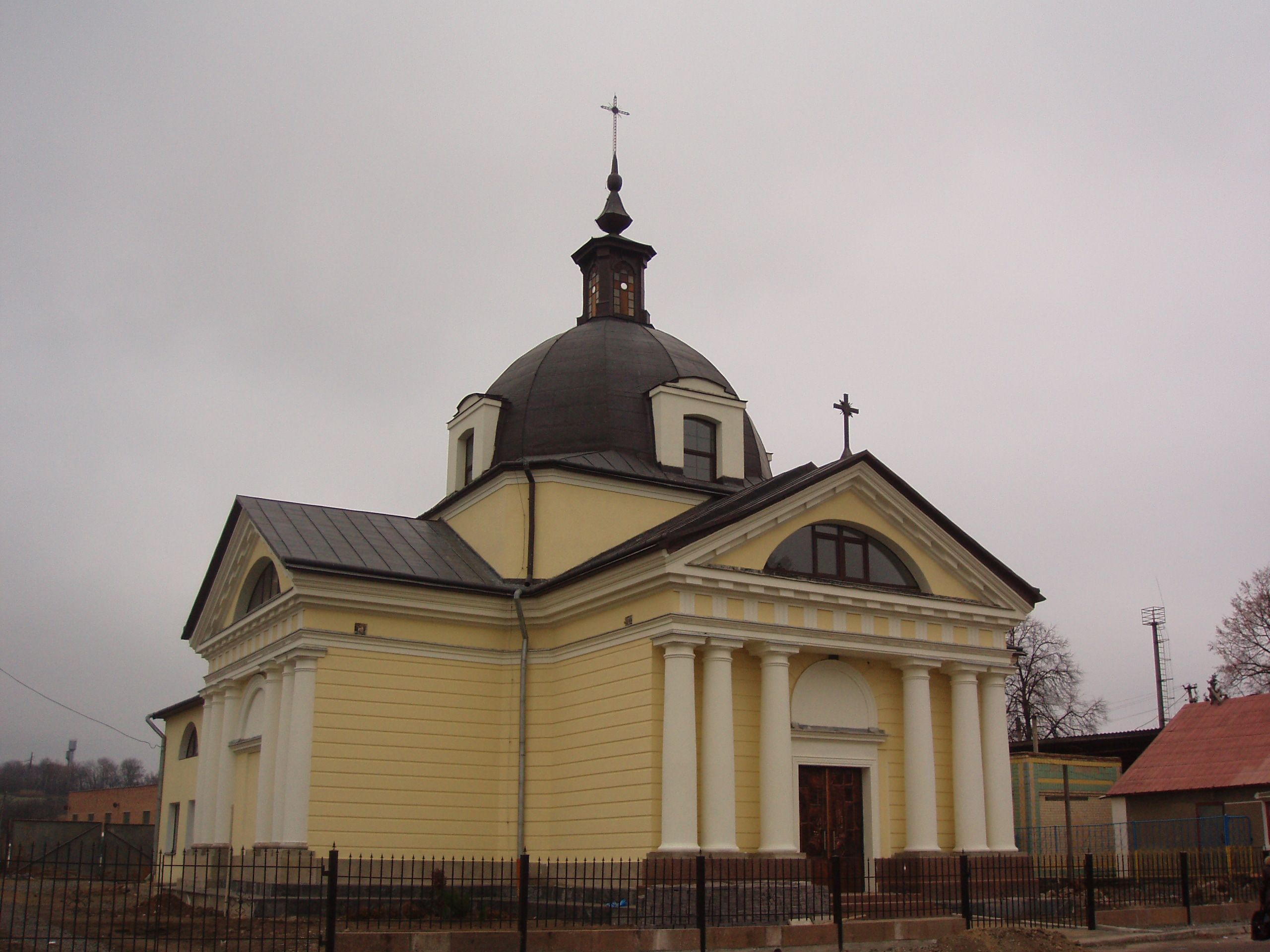
- Catholic church in Ruzhyn

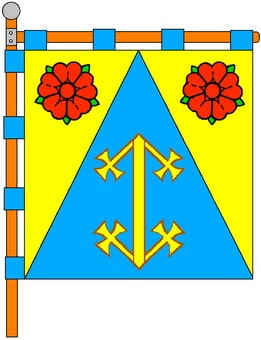
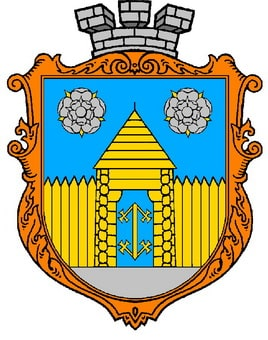
- Flag Coat of arms

- Location in Zhytomyr Oblast Location in Ukraine
- Coordinates: 49°43′N 29°14′E
- Country: Ukraine
- Oblast: Zhytomyr
- Raion: Berdychiv Raion
- First mentioned: 1071
- Urban-type settlement status: 1962

Government
  - Mayor: Liudmyla Biliak

Area
  - Total: 6 km^{2} (2.3 sq mi)
- Elevation: 214 m (702 ft)

Population (2022)
  - Total: 4,209
  - Density: 700/km^{2} (1,800/sq mi)
- Postal code: 13600
- Area code: +380 4138

Ruzhyn (Ukrainian: Ружин; Polish: Rużyn; Russian: Ружин translit. Ruzhyn; Yiddish: רוזשין, Rizhn) is a rural settlement in Berdychiv Raion, Zhytomyr Oblast, Ukraine. Prior to the administrative reform of 2020, it served as the administrative centre of the former Ruzhyn Raion. Population: 4,209 (2022 estimate)

== History ==
=== Prehistory ===
Archaeological discoveries of stone tools and carvings, dating to 5000 BCE were made in the Ruzhyn area. This was termed the Trypillian culture.

=== Antiquity ===
The nomadic Scythians controlled the area from approximately 500-300 BCE, replaced by the Sarmatians, who were based on the western banks of the Dniester. Later, a Hellenistic Antiv culture built a defensive wall near Ruzhyn, and extended its territorial reach to all the area between the Dniester & Dnieper Rivers. Traces of this culture have been found with discoveries of coins, glassware, and ceramics, which date up to the 5th century.

=== Middle Ages to early modern period ===
A 12th-13th century cross was found in Ruzhyn, attesting to the arrival of Christianity in the area. Sherbiv (as Ruzhyn was then known) was the home of a Mongol khan, along with his 13 slaves.

Ruzhyn's history is that of Ukraine, as a whole:

- founding of Kyivan Rus in 885 by prince Oleg
- occupation by the Mongol Golden Horde in the mid-13th century
- occupation by Lithuanian nobles from 1398 to 1449
- the "Independence War" against Poland, led by Bogdan Chmielnitski from 1648 to 1657, in which tens of thousands of Jews were massacred

Polish noblemen began to wield influence in the western Ukraine. In 1596, one – Count Kirik Ruzhynsky – changed the name of the town from Sherbiv to Ruzhyn. In 1608, Kirik's brother Adam aided Dmitri – a false pretender to the throne in Moscow – to raise an army which consisted of a thousand horsemen. To raise the funds, he leased some of his lands and mortgaged the town of Ruzhyn to Kristof Kevlitch. With the defeat of Dimitri's revolt, the Ruzhynsky properties fell into disarray.

=== Modern period ===
In the mid-17th century, a cathedral was built in nearby Bilylivka. Chmielnicki's Cossacks marched through Ruzhyn for the first time in December 1648. The land was subsequently partitioned and granted to Cossack officers. Forests were cleared for farming. By 1651, Ruzhyn was prospering. With a peace treaty signed between Russia, Ukraine and Poland in 1667, lands including Ruzhyn reverted to Polish control. Ruzhyn was controlled soon after by prince Wiśniowiecki (ukr. Vyshnevetsky).

In 1736, the local manager of Pavolich had 35 Jewish citizens killed, and their properties, valued at 180,000 zlotys, were confiscated. The first burials in Ruzhyn's Jewish cemetery are thought to date to 1776.

Meanwhile, the Catholic cathedral was built in Ruzhyn, and in 1845 a 6-bed hospital was added to its holdings. The fabric industry, with the establishment of two factories, became a cornerstone of industry in the town. A leather factory, owned by August Wolf, started operations in 1862. Subsequently, brick factories, liquor distilleries, oil processing plants & steam-powered mills sprung up throughout Ruzhyn; as did a post office, another hospital, an Orthodox church and a synagogue.

By 1906, Ruzhyn's population consisted of Ukrainians, Poles and Jews and surpassed 4,000 residents. Including the suburb of Balamutivka would have brought the total to over 6,000. Ukrainians were educated in state-run schools; Jews in heders and yeshivas; and Poles in clandestine Polish schools (in Balamutivka). The town, by 1908, had established a theatre, cinema, Catholic cathedral and its own electric power station.

=== First World War ===
With the onset of World War I, the army mobilized many citizens – and provisions and horses were demanded for the war effort. Following a brief period of Ukrainian independence (1917–18), the Germans marched into Ruzhyn on February 27, 1918. They left one week after the Armistice, on November 18, 1918.

In a 1919 pogrom, Jews were robbed and beaten, and a large tribute was exacted from the community.

=== Soviet Union ===
Throughout the 1920s and 1930s, Joseph Stalin's Bolshevik government and troops called for provisions from Ukraine, the "bread-basket of the Europe". Under this policy, the peasantry's produce was harvested, through mandatory quotas, only to be shipped to the population centers of Moscow, St. Petersburg etc. During the period known today as the Ukrainian Famine of 1932–33, between 6-7 million Ukrainians were starved to death.

Many protests against this policy shook Ruzhyn. A top-secret report by the NKVD (precursor to the KGB) entitled "Counter-Revolutionary Activities in Ruzhyn District" reported that 70% of Ruzhyn and Balamutivka's 543 farmers had been grouped into a kolkhoz (a collective) and that there was a marked increase of "banditism", as people stole & scrounged for anything to eat.

During this period, cannibalism was witnessed in various places throughout Ukraine, among them, the Ruzhyn District. By 1939, the Jewish community dropped to 1,108 people.

== Jewish and Hassidic history ==
Ruzhyn became one of the most important centers of Hasidic Judaism. It is most famous for the presence and establishment of the "royal court" of a very important and legendary Hasidic leader. Rabbi Israel Friedman (1796–1850) was the great-grandson of the Maggid of Mezritch, the chief disciple of the Baal Shem Tov, the founder of Hasidism. Rabbi Friedman, commonly known as the Heiliger ("Holy") Ruzhyner, established Ruzhyn as a place of pilgrimage to other seeking deeper spiritual understanding. He was famous for his luxurious lifestyle – which he humbly espoused was an honor to the glory of the Torah.

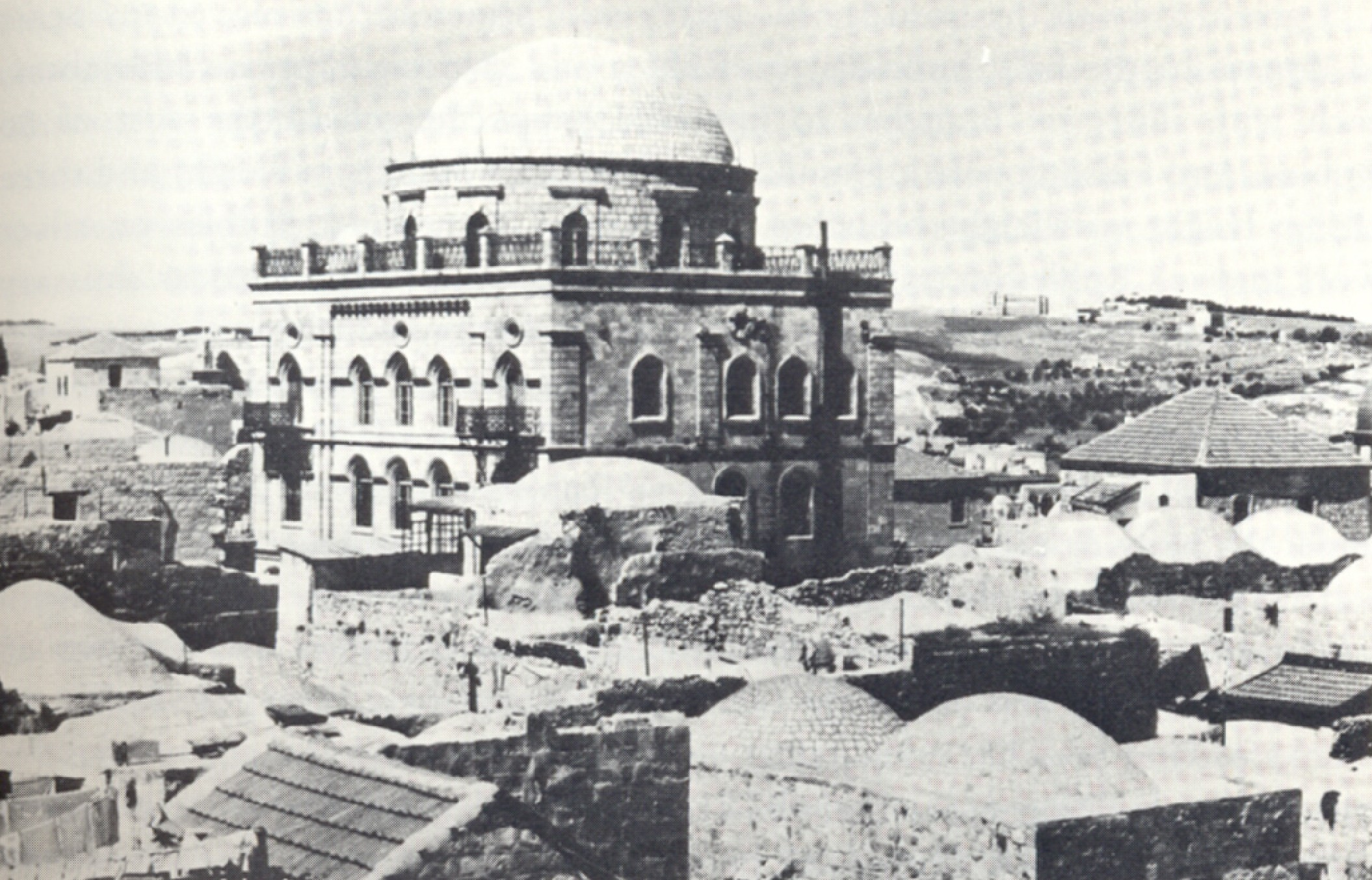
The Tiferes Yisrael Synagogue in Jerusalem was sponsored by Rabbi Yisroel Friedman of Ruzhyn and named in his honor.

Ruzhyn became one of the most important centers of Jewish learning in the world. He sponsored the founding of one of the most important synagogues in Jerusalem – which was later named after him, the Tiferes Yisrael Synagogue. The impressive dome had been donated by Emperor Franz-Josef of Austria, who visited the synagogue on his way to the dedication of the Suez Canal.

In 1838, following accusations of having had informers murdered, the czar himself issued orders for the Rebbe's arrest. He spent 22 months in a Kyiv dungeon, before spending six more months in a prison in Kamenitz. He was released, without ever being charged or tried, on Shushan Purim. Hearing that the czar had ordered his re-arrest, the Rebbe fled to Kishinev (Moldova), then to Iasi (Romania) Austria, and then re-settled in Sadagora (Bukovina-Ukraine), where he founded a large synagogue and re-established his Hasidic court. He died ten years later, leaving six sons to continue his path. Each of them founded Hasidic dynasties in their own right.

By 1863, the town's population totaled 2,663, most of which were Jews. A winery was leased to one Yankel Shapiro in 1880 and managed by Shia Klatchny. The lease passed to Yankel's son, Abram, in 1896 who also leased a steam-powered grist mill. The sugar factory, in nearby Toporakh, was owned by Moshe Isayevich Gorovitz and run by his manager, Yosef Franzovich Lissel. A brewery was built, as was a 72-bed hospital, which catered almost exclusively to the Jewish community. The merchants of Ruzhyn were known for their highly valued horses, where brought to Berdichev on market days. In 1890, Ruzhyn was administered by Anton Ossipovich Zlotnitsky. In 1897, of a total population of 5,016 people, the Jewish community numbered 3,599.

In 1905, the first rumblings of what would become the Bolshevik Revolution were heard in Ruzhyn. Young Jewish workers in Ruzhyn, associated with the Bund, led by S. Ostrovsky distributed Socialist publications and called for strikes. In October of that year, several strikers (S. Ostrovsky, Y. Mogilevsky, L. Pavalotsky, S. Trusevich and V. Urinova-Rabinovich) were arrested and sentenced to prison terms in the Archangel Gubernia in Siberia. With some wrangling, their parents arranged that they were to be allowed to go abroad for three years; facing a new term of imprisonment if they should return before the end of the term. However, with the czar wildly claiming that 90% of the revolutionaries were Jews, pogroms swept the Russian Empire – notably in Ukraine and Bessarabia (Moldova). Pogroms, led by Cossacks – set for immediately after the Orthodox Easter - tore into the Jewish communities, killing and looting Jews in scattered towns & villages. In Ruzhyn, Cossacks entered the heder, throwing the students out into the street.

== World War II and the Holocaust ==
The Germans, violating their own treaty with the Soviet Union (the Molotov–Ribbentrop Pact), invaded the USSR in 1941. On July 17 the German army seized Ruzhyn, intending to preserve the kolkhoz system – merely diverting the collected produce from its intended destination in Moscow to its own warehouses. All craftsmen were expected to contribute to the Nazi German Army. Not only were provisions demanded (milk, foodstuffs, meat and warm clothing), but also an annual head tax of 200 rubles was imposed on the town. Resistance would be severely punished.

The Germans and local Ukrainian policeman ("Polizei") killed the Jews of Ruzhyn in many brutal stages. In a forest nearby, are three mass graves (killings occurred on 9/10/41), marked today by fencing and a plaque. There is one mass grave (where killings occurred on 5/1/42) on the outskirts of the town. An obelisk-shaped monument and plaque marks this large mass grave. This monument and those in the forest were constructed by a group of Ruzhiners after the war. Supposedly, another exists – whose location is still a mystery – but may be close to the three mass graves, in the forest.

The Germans organized local policemen, termed "Polizei" to carry out the killings of the Jews. One group, the "Oum" was led by Kostu Stepan Michalavich. The largest group of Polizei was led by Rodenko. While other members of these killing squads were hanged by the Soviets after the war, Rodenko was only arrested in the 1970s and died in prison, awaiting trial. The Red Army began to push the Germans out of the Ruzhyn area on December 24, 1943.

As far as Jewish history is concerned, the sanctification of the mass graves of the Jewish community of Ruzhyn is the last chapter.

== Notable residents ==
- Rabbi Yisroel Friedman, the Rizhiner Rebbe, sponsor of the Tiferes Yisrael Synagogue in Jerusalem.
- Berl Repetur, signatory of the Israeli Declaration of Independence.

== Nearby municipalities ==
- Pohrebysche (South)
- Skvyra (East)
