= Fritz Stoll =

American soccer player

Personal information
- Date of birth: January 23, 1909
- Place of birth: Germany
- Date of death: March 6, 1989 (aged 80)
- Place of death: United States

Senior career*
Years	Team	Apps	(Gls)
1933–1943	Philadelphia German-Americans		
- * Club domestic league appearances and goals

Friedrich "Fritz" Stoll (January 23, 1909 – March 6, 1989) was an American soccer player who was a member of the United States soccer team at the 1936 Summer Olympics. He also played ten seasons in the American Soccer League.

Stoll signed with the Philadelphia German-Americans in 1933. He would play for the German-Americans until 1943. In 1935, Stoll and his teammates won the league title. A year later, they won the 1936 National Challenge Cup. He was selected for the 1936 U.S. Olympic soccer team, but did not play in the lone U.S. game of the tournament.
