= George Schlitz =

Australian rules footballer

Personal information
- Full name: George Victor Schlitz
- Born: 11 August 1909; Quambatook, Victoria
- Died: 21 March 1989 (aged 79); Leeton, New South Wales
- Original team: Leeton
- Height: 180 cm (5 ft 11 in)

Playing career^{1}
Years	Club	Games (Goals)
1933	St Kilda (VFL)	7 (1)
1934	Sandringham (VFA)	13 (5)
Total		20 (6)
- ^{1} Playing statistics correct to the end of 1934.

George Victor Schlitz (11 August 1909 – 21 March 1989) was an Australian rules footballer who played with the St Kilda Football Club in the Victorian Football League (VFL), and the Sandringham Football Club in the Victorian Football Association (VFA).

== Family ==
The son of Violet Ristoria Schlitz (1887–1968), George Victor Schlitz was born at Quambatook, Victoria on 11 August 1909.

He married Hilda Mary Parry/Donnelly (1912–1987) in 1938.
