= Fred Beattie =

English cricketer

Personal information
- Full name: Fred Demetrius Beattie
- Born: 18 August 1909; Ashton upon Mersey, Cheshire, England
- Died: 20 March 1989 (aged 79); Llanystumdwy, Caernarfonshire, Wales
- Batting: Right-handed
- Bowling: Right-arm medium

Domestic team information
- Years: Team
- 1932: Lancashire
- 1930–1933: Minor Counties

Career statistics
Competition	First-class
Matches	7
Runs scored	172
Batting average	17.20
100s/50s	–/–
Top score	36
Balls bowled	–
Wickets	–
Bowling average	–
5 wickets in innings	–
10 wickets in match	–
Best bowling	–
Catches/stumpings	–/–
- Source: Cricinfo, 9 July 2012

Fred Demetrius Beattie (18 August 1909 – 20 March 1989) was an English cricketer. Beattie was a right-handed batsman who bowled right-arm medium pace. He was born at Ashton upon Mersey, Cheshire and attended Rossall Preparatory School in 1919 before joining the main Rossall School, where he was in Pelican House. He left Rossall in 1927 after playing in the cricket eleven in his final two years.

Beattie played second XI cricket for Lancashire in the Minor Counties Championship from 1928, which entitled him to play for the combined Minor Counties cricket team. He made his first-class debut for the Minor Counties against Lancashire at Old Trafford in 1930. His first-class debut for Lancashire came the 1932 County Championship against Derbyshire. He made four further first-class appearances for the county in 1932, the last of which came against Somerset. In his five first-class matches in that season, he scored 120 runs at an average of 15.00, with a high score of 36. In 1933, he made a final first-class appearance, for the Minor Counties against Oxford University at the University Parks.

He was the honorary secretary of the Old Rossallian Cricket Club from 1934 to 1953, was a Lancashire County Cricket Club vice-president, a county rugby referee, a member of the Rossall Council 1949-66 and later served as the President of Lancashire County Cricket Club in 1975 and 1976. He died at Llanystumdwy, Caernarfonshire, Wales, on 20 March 1989.
