= Gi Hyeong-do =

South Korean poet (1960–1989)

Ki Hyongdo
- Born: 13 March 1960; Ongjin County, Gyeonggi, South Korea
- Died: 7 March 1989 (aged 28); Jongno District
- Resting place: Ansung
- Education: Yonsei University
- Writing career
- Language: Korean

Korean name
- Hangul: 기형도
- Hanja: 奇亨度
- RR: Gi Hyeongdo
- MR: Ki Hyŏngdo

Ki Hyongdo (Korean: 기형도; 13 March 1960 – 7 March 1989) was a Korean poet. His posthumously-published collection of poems The Black Leaf in My Mouth (입 속의 검은 잎) has gone through more than 65 printings in the two decades since his death.

== Early life ==
Ki was born the youngest of seven siblings on Yeonpyeongdo, Gyeonggi Province, South Korea. His father hailed from Hwanghae Province in present-day North Korea, which he fled amid the turmoil of the Korean War (1950–53). His father remained on the island working as a county-level functionary until 1964, when he moved with his family to the peninsular mainland, settling in Soha Village, Gyeonggi Prefecture (present-day Soha District, Gwangmyeong). While growing up in a shanty town west of Incheon in an area known for its communities of displaced refugees and evacuees, Gi attended Siheung Elementary School where he proved a top student, his awards for outstanding performance filling up a ramyeon box.

Ki's father built the family home and at first made a good living as a farmer. When a promising business deal fell through, however, family fortunes declined and then further worsened with the father's collapse from cerebral palsy in 1969. The family's plot of land had to be sold to pay for the father's medical expenses. Ki's prose poem "Genealogy in Jeopardy-1969" (위험한 가계 -1969) describes the sombre mood of his home life during this period. His mother was obliged to work outside the home as a market-seller to feed her family, and the children also had to work.

== Education ==
As a student at Sillim Middle School (1973–76), Ki began writing poetry after one of his sisters was murdered in an act of violence perpetrated by a congregation (church) member. Besides writing, he was active as a baritone in a school choral group called "Mokdong" and regularly won prizes at school literary composition contests.

After graduating from Jungang High School in 1979, Ki entered Yonsei University as a student in Political Law. He joined the campus literary group "Yonsei Literature Club" (연세문학회) and received commendation from the campus newspaper for a short novel detailing his unhappy family life. He chose Political Diplomacy as his major in 1980. He entered obligatory military service in 1981 and was stationed near Anyang, where he participated in the local literary circle "Suri." The group inspired Ki to further engross himself in writing poetry. After his discharge he continued to read and to write. He rematriculated to Yonsei University in 1983 and in the same year won the campus Yun Dong-ju Prize for his poem "Tree-Planting Ceremony" (식목제).

== Fame ==
In 1984, Ki was employed as a reporter at the JoongAng Ilbo, a daily newspaper, while continuing his studies and honing his creative writing skills. He formally debuted in the world of letters by winning The Dong-A Ilbo New Year's Literary Contest with his celebrated poem "Fog" (안개), a stinging critique of Korea's industrializing society. He graduated from Yonsei in 1985 and joined the JoongAng Ilbo's prestigious Politics section as a full-time reporter. At this time he began publishing poems marked by powerful individuality and an intensely pessimistic world view combining exquisite sensibility with themes of helplessness, longing, disappointment and anger. The content of Ki's poems often refers to unknown sexual partners or desires which are always referred to in gender neutral terms which can be interpreted as a way to keep from fully disclosing his sexuality. In 1986, he requested to be transferred from the Politics section to the Culture section where he covered cultural events, publications and TV dramas. In the summer of 1988, he traveled alone to London and Paris. He transferred again to the Editing section the same year.

== Collections ==
- Black Leaf in My Mouth (Ib sog-ui geomeun ip 1989)
- Records of a Short Journey (1990)
- Losing Love, I Write (Sarang-eul ilko na-neun sseune 1994)
- Complete Works of Gi Hyeong-do (1999)

== Awards ==
- Yun Dong-ju Literature Award (1982)

== See also ==
- Korean Literature
- List of Korean-language poets
