= Frederick Ramsden =

Scottish cricketer

Personal information
- Full name: Frederick William Ramsden
- Born: 11 January 1911; Leeds, Yorkshire, England
- Died: 12 March 1989 (aged 78); Largs, Ayrshire, Scotland
- Batting: Right-handed

Domestic team information
- Years: Team
- 1937–1939: Scotland

Career statistics
Competition	First-class
Matches	4
Runs scored	108
Batting average	13.50
100s/50s	–/–
Top score	29
Catches/stumpings	1/–
- Source: Cricinfo, 6 July 2022

Frederick William Ramsden (11 January 1911 – 12 March 1989) was an English-born Scottish first-class cricketer.

Ramsden was born at Leeds in January 1911 and was educated in Scotland at Paisley Grammar School. A club cricketer for Ferguslie Cricket Club, Ramsden made his debut for Scotland in first-class cricket against Ireland at Belfast in 1937. He made two further first-class appearances in 1937, against the touring New Zealanders at Glasgow, and Yorkshire at Harrogate as part of Scotland's tour of England. Two years later, he made his final first-class appearance for Scotland against Ireland at Dublin. In his four matches, he scored 108 runs at an average of 13.50, with a highest score of 29. A bank manager by profession, Ramsden died in March 1989 at Largs, Ayrshire.
