= Pink Farm Commonwealth War Graves Commission Cemetery =

WWI CWGC cemetery in Gallipoli, Turkey

Pink Farm Cemetery
- Commonwealth War Graves Commission
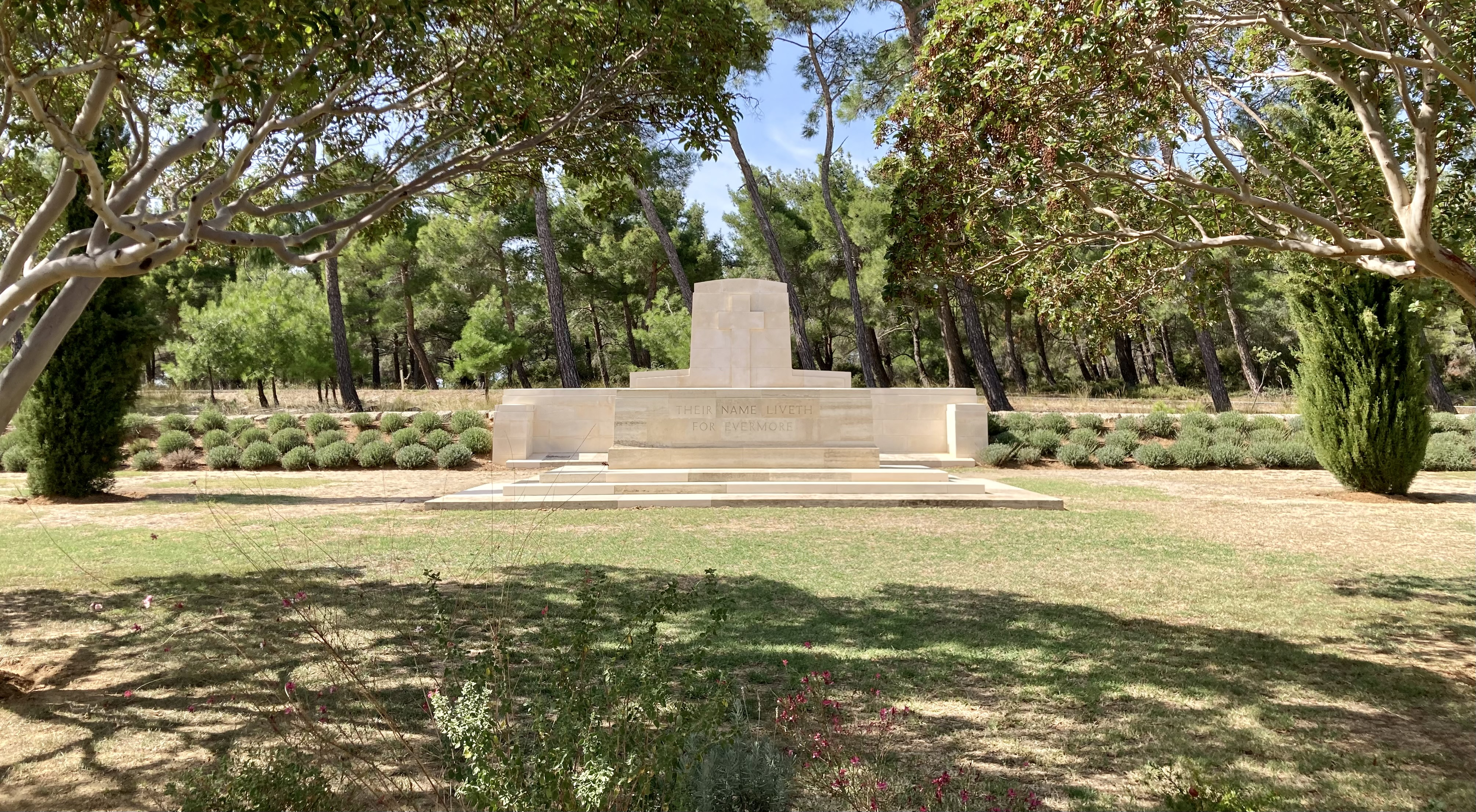
- Used for those deceased 1915-1916
- Established: 1915
- Location: 40.0728°N 26.1906°E near Krithia, Helles, Turkey
- Total burials: 602
- Unknowns: 250

Burials by nation
- Allied Powers: United Kingdom: 421; Australia: 3; New Zealand: 5 (3 identified); Undivided India: 9

Burials by war
- World War I: 602

Pink Farm Cemetery is a small Commonwealth War Graves Commission burial ground for the dead of World War I located near the village of Krithia on the Gallipoli Peninsula in Turkey. It contains the remains of some of the allied troops who died during the Battle of Gallipoli.

Sotiri Farm was named Pink Farm by the allied troops after the colour of the soil. Three cemeteries were constructed around the farm, and were combined on the site of Pink Farm Cemetery No 3, which contained 139 graves, after the Armistice and enlarged as bodies from other areas were brought to it.
