= The Black Leaf in My Mouth =

1998 South Korean poetry collection

The Black Leaf in My Mouth (Korean: 입 속의 검은 잎, Ip sog-ui geomeun ip) is a poetry collection written by Ki Hyongdo.

As Ki Hyongdo was preparing to publish the collection in 1989, he suddenly died from a stroke. The collection was published later that year. His early death added a sense of tragedy to the sorrow and despair that was already present in the first half of the collection and gave rise to the so-called "Ki Hyongdo Syndrome".

== Overview ==
=== Title ===
It was literary critic Kim Hyun who chose the collection's title Ip sog-ui geomeun ip. Kim Hyun also wrote an analysis of the poetry collection under the title “Yeongwonhi dachin binbangui cheheom (영원히 닫힌 빈방의 체험 Experience of an Eternally Closed and Empty Room).”

Ki Hyongdo originally had been thinking of titling his first poetry collection as ‘Warning at the Station,’ according to his older sister. Instead he used this title for a work he published in 1988, the first line of which goes, “Mianhajiman naneun ije himangeul noraeharyeonda (미안하지만 나는 이제 희망을 노래하련다 Sorry, but I’m going to try to sing of hope now).” Ki Hyongdo's older sister, while admitting that her brother's poems were primarily dark and gloomy, has pointed to this poem which sings of a turn toward hope. She said that if Ki Hyongdo were still alive, he would have become a poet who continued to sing of hope. Ki Hyongdo's initial title, ‘Warning at the Station,’ became the title for the collection of works published to celebrate the 20th anniversary of his passing.

=== Themes ===
==== Tragic Worldview ====
The dominating feature of Ip sog-ui geomeun ip is its tragic worldview. What make’s Ki Hyongdo and this poetry collection unique is that, unlike the majority of poems that take on such a worldview and express a desire to escape the present circumstances, Ki Hyongdo’s poems remain in a nightmarish reality and stubbornly search for meaning there. In other worlds, only the painful reality of the present exists in Ki Hyongdo’s poems. In this sense, as argued by Kim Hyun, Ki Hyongdo wasn’t an alchemist searching for gold in the mud, but a realist who called mud for what it was.

==== Childhood Poverty ====
The cause of all the gloom, sorrow, and unease that surrounds Ip sog-ui geomeun ip is Ki Hyongdo’s childhood experiences. In “Eomma geokjeong (엄마 걱정 Worrying about Mother),” the poet remembers when he was a child and used to shake with loneliness when his mother would go out to work and not come back until late into the night. The quote below shows a poor household and the loneliness which the poet experienced because of it. As time passes and the poet becomes an adult, he speaks of the past with a voice laced with more longing than fear. Yet despite this, the things that have taken root deep within the poet, such as an empty room, being alone, and loneliness, leave their mark throughout the collection of poetry.

Yeolmu samsip daneul igo 열무 삼십 단을 이고

sijange gan uri eomma 시장에 간 우리 엄마

an osine, 안 오시네,

haeneun sideun ji orae 해는 시든 지 오래

naneun chanbapcheoreom bange damgyeo 나는 찬밥처럼 방에 담겨

amuri cheoncheonhi sukjereul haedo 아무리 천천히 숙제를 해도

eomma an osine 엄마 안 오시네

baechuip gateun balsori tabaktabak 배추잎 같은 발소리 타박타박

an deulline, eodupgo museowo 안 들리네, 어둡고 무서워

geumgan chang teumeuro goyohi bitsori 금간 창 틈으로 고요히 밧소리

binbange honja eopdeuryeo huljjeokgeorideon 빈방에 혼자 엎드려 훌쩍거리던

Putting thirty radishes on her head

My mother went to the market

But she has not returned,

It’s been sometime since the sun has set

I sit in the room like cold rice

I do my homework as slow as I can

But she has not returned

Those footsteps like napa cabbage,

I cannot hear

It’s dark and I’m scared

Through the crack in the window I hear the faint sound of rain

As I sniffle alone, lying face down in the empty room

==== The Pain of Farewells ====
Another source of pain in Ip sog-ui geomeun ip is parting with loved ones. The poem “Bin Jip” (빈 집 Empty House) begins with the line, “Sarangeul ilko naneun sseune (사랑을 잃고 나는 쓰네 I lost love and now write)”. After saying, “Jal itgeora, jjalbatdeon bamdeura (잘 있거라, 짧았던 밤들아 Farewell, short nights),” and bidding farewell, the poet says goodbye to everything else: the fog outside the window, the candles in the room, the white papers, the reluctance filled fears, and all his past desires. And after having made farewells with all these things, the poet finally writes, “Gayeopseun nae sarang bin jibe gatyeonne (가엾은 내 사랑 빈 집에 갇혔네 My poor love is stuck in an empty house).” Just as in “Eomma Geokjeong,” the poet in “Bin Jip” has shut his wounds in a small room and is now looking back in longing. As Kim Hyun has said, the internal and personal wounds are reborn through the poet’s self-reflection in a lyrical voice.

==== Social Criticism ====
The poet’s gloom and isolation are deeply related to the atmosphere of oppression and fear that was widespread throughout Korean society in the 1980s, when these poems of Ki Hyongdo’s were written. Not surprisingly, there are indirect criticisms of society present in Ip sog-ui geomeun ip. The poet for example says, “Geu iri teojyeosseul ttae (그 일이 터졌을 때 When that incident happened),” referring indirectly to some event. Although the poet never specifically names the event he is referring to, one can infer that this poem is closely related to the political climate of the mid to late 1980s from passages such as “Geuhae yeoreum maneun saramdeuri mudeogiro eopseojyeotgo (그해 여름 많은 사람들이 무더기로 없어졌고 That summer many people disappeared in heaps)” and “Geurigo geu iri teojyeotda, eolma hu geuga jugeotda (그리고 그 일이 터졌다, 얼마 후 그가 죽었다 And that incidence occurred, and he died not long after).” In that violent reality, life was met with fear and death. In the last stanza of the titular poem “Ip sog-ui geomeun ip(입 속의 검은 잎 The Black Leaf in My Mouth),” the poet confesses how afraid he is by writing, “Nae ip soge akchakgachi maedallin geomeun ipi naneun duryeopda (내 입 속에 악착같이 매달린 검은 잎이 나는 두렵다 I am afraid of the black leaf hanging stubbornly inside my mouth).”

== Critical reception ==
Ip sog-ui geomeun ip, the only poetry collection Ki Hyongdo left behind, created reactions that were so extreme they have been labeled a “syndrome.” The keen self-awareness unique to youths and the despair and gloom that pervades the entire work resonated deeply with readers and the literati. The knowledge that Ki Hyongdo died so unexpectedly at the young age of just 29 also served to strengthen this reaction. The infatuation with Ki Hyongdo was so extreme that lovers of literature and aspiring poets even claimed that they wanted to die early like Ki Hyongdo and would imitate him by going to third-rate theatre houses to drink. This caused one literary critic to coin the term “Ki Hyongdo Syndrome” and argue for the symbolism and generational significance held by Ip sog-ui geomeun ip. Ki Hyongdo’s poems are some of the few that have been praised as a eulogy marking the end of the 1980s. There are also those who say that Ki Hyongdo was a sort of “persona” to a generation of youths who experienced the inward gloom of a time when student activism was declining and the possibility of political reform was narrowing.

== Translations ==
<<입 속의 검은 잎>>, 문지, 1989 / Une feuille noire dans la bouche, Circé, 2012.

<<입 속의 검은 잎>>, 문지, 1989 / La hoja negra dentro de la boca, Verbum, 2005.
