= Reg Mulavin =

Australian rules footballer, born 1912

Personal information
- Full name: Reginald Mulavin
- Born: 8 September 1912; Kew, Victoria
- Died: 13 March 1989 (aged 76); Heidelberg, Victoria

Playing career^{1}
| Years | Club | Games (Goals) |
| 1930 | Hawthorn | 11 (0) |
- ^{1} Playing statistics correct to the end of 1930.

Reg Mulavin (8 September 1912 – 13 March 1989) was an Australian rules footballer who played with Hawthorn in the Victorian Football League (VFL).
