= Stan Penberthy =

Australian rules footballer, born 1906

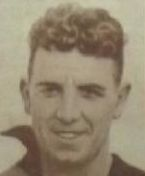

Personal information
- Full name: Stanley Archibald Penberthy
- Born: 3 June 1906; Subiaco, Western Australia
- Died: 31 March 1989 (aged 82)
- Original team: Subiaco
- Height: 179 cm (5 ft 10 in)
- Weight: 85 kg (187 lb)

Playing career^{1}
Years	Club	Games (Goals)
1927–1931	Subiaco	77 (25)
1932–1937	Footscray	75 (22)
1937	Melbourne	11 (0)
Total		163 (47)
- ^{1} Playing statistics correct to the end of 1937.

Stanley Archibald Penberthy (3 June 1906 – 31 March 1989) was an Australian rules footballer who played with Subiaco in the West Australian Football League (WAFL), and Footscray and Melbourne in the Victorian Football League (VFL).

Penberthy, a follower, played 77 games at Subiaco between 1927 and 1931. Amongst his seven interstate appearances for Western Australia were games at the 1930 Adelaide Carnival. He also played cricket for Subiaco.

In 1932 he left the state and joined Footscray, with whom he would spend five and a half seasons. He captained Footscray in 1936, before being delisted mid year in 1937. He was then recruited and played out the year with Melbourne. His last league game was a preliminary final, which Melbourne lost to Collingwood.
