= Jo Mommers =

Dutch association football player

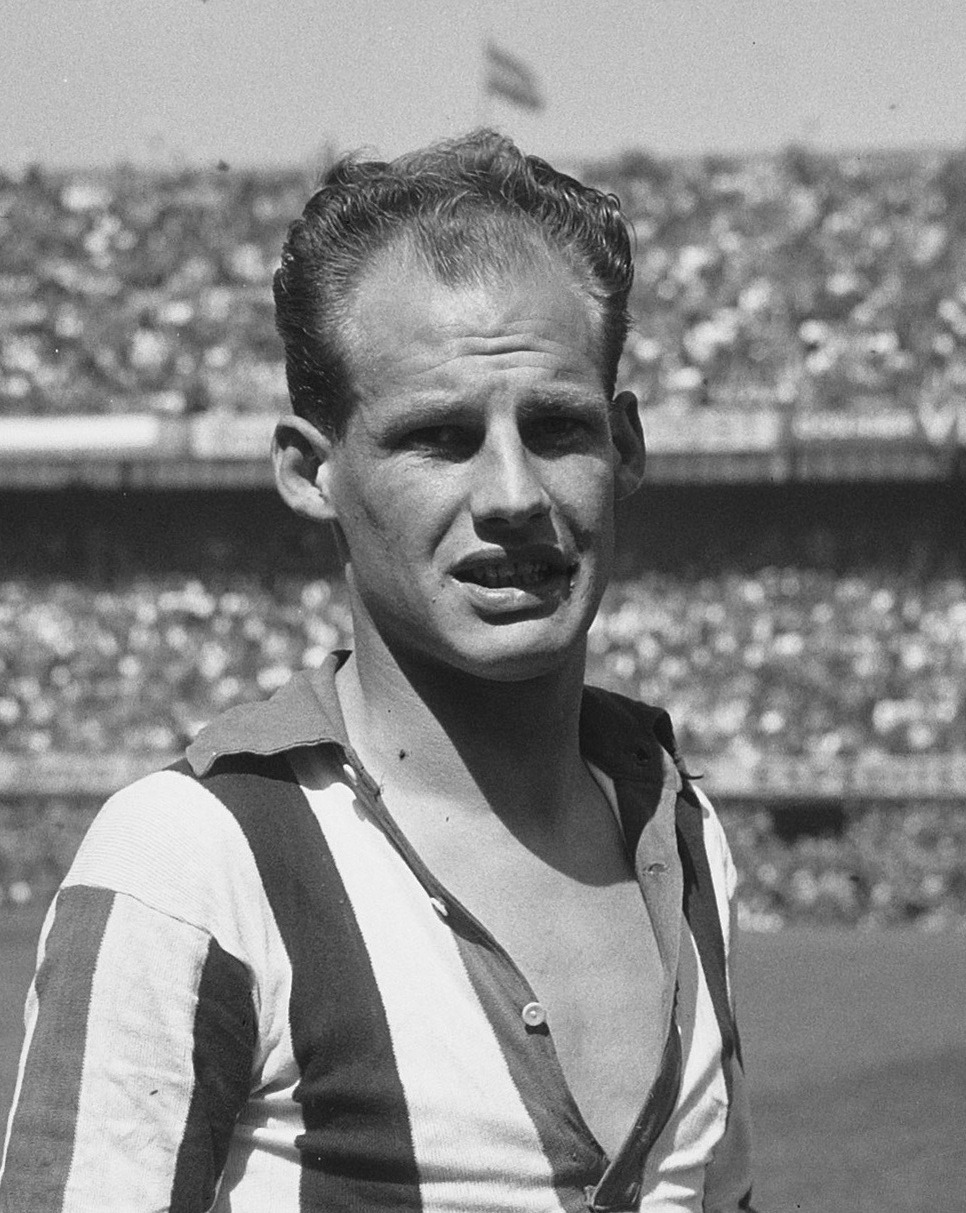
- Mommers in 1952

Personal information
- Full name: Johannes Cornelis Adrianus Mommers
- Date of birth: 12 June 1927
- Place of birth: Tilburg, Netherlands
- Date of death: 13 March 1989 (aged 61)
- Position: Forward

Youth career
- GUDOK

Senior career*
Years	Team	Apps	(Gls)
1946–1955	Willem II		

International career
1952	Netherlands	1	(0)
- * Club domestic league appearances and goals

Johannes Cornelis Adrianus "Jo" Mommers (12 June 1927 – 13 March 1989) was a Dutch footballer who played as a forward. He competed in the men's tournament at the 1952 Summer Olympics.

Born in Tilburg, Mommers started his football career at local club GUDOK before moving to the main club in the city, Willem II at age 17. He broke his leg in a 3–1 loss to NAC, where he collided with opposing player Louis Overbeeke.

== Honours ==
Willem II

- Netherlands Football League Championship: 1951–52, 1954–55
