= Berl Repetur =

Israeli politician (1902–1989)

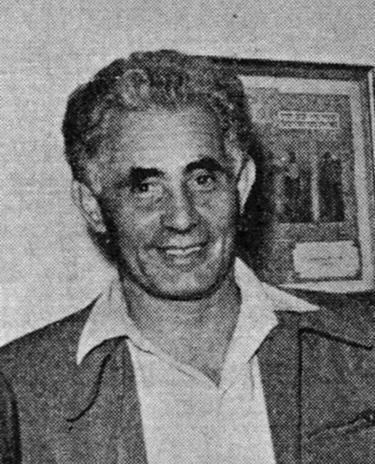

Faction represented in the Knesset
- 1949–1951: Mapam

Personal details
- Born: 1902 Ruzhyn, Russian Empire
- Died: 23 March 1989 (aged 86–87)

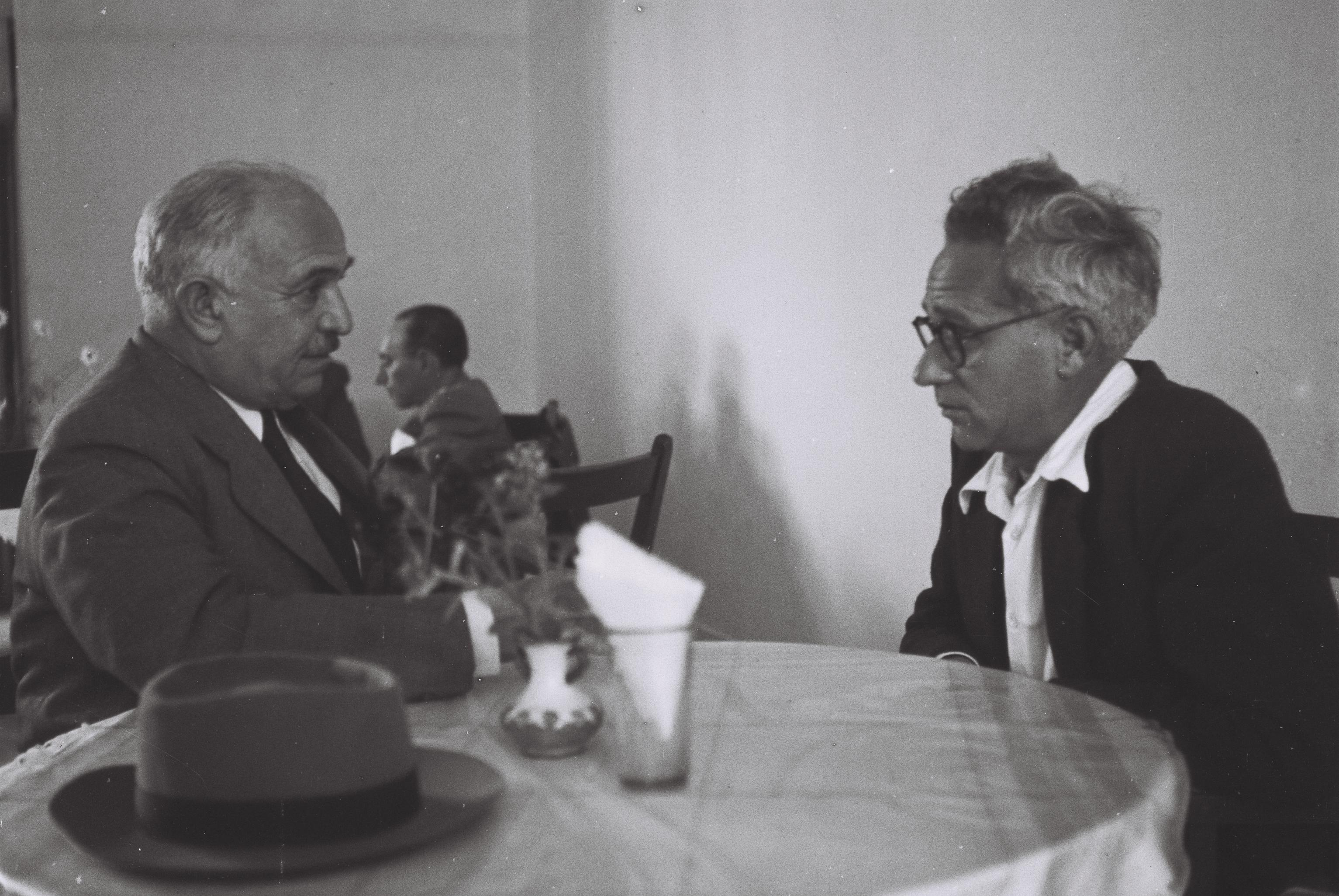
Repetur (right) and David Remez, 1948

Berl Repetur (Hebrew: ברל רפטור; 1902 – 23 March 1989) was a Zionist activist, Israeli politician and one of the signatories of the Israeli declaration of independence.

== Biography ==
Born in Ruzhyn in the Volhynia Governorate of the Russian Empire (today in Ukraine), Repetur was educated in a heder and was a member of the Dror and HeHalutz youth movements. During the pogroms he helped to organize Jewish defense groups.

In 1920 Repetur emigrated to Mandatory Palestine and joined Ahdut HaAvoda and the Haganah in Haifa. In 1922 he became a member of the Haifa Workers Council secretariat. In 1927 he was appointed secretary of the Labour exchange of the Histadrut labor federation. He also served as head of the Solel Boneh construction company.

In 1935 and 1939 Repetur was a delegate to the Zionist Congress and was sent on missions to Germany and Poland.

In 1944 he was amongst the "B faction" that split from Mapai and later formed Mapam together with Ahdut HaAvoda and Poale Zion. Two years later he was arrested by the British Authorities during Operation Agatha and imprisoned in Rafah.

In 1948 Repetur joined the pre-state legislature, Moetzet HaAm (later the Provisional State Council) and was amongst the signatories of Israel's declaration of independence. He was elected to the first Knesset in 1949 on Mapam's list, but lost his seat in the 1951 elections.

Repetur died in 1989. His wife Sonia was a founder of kibbutz Yagur and an aunt of politician Yossi Sarid.

== Bibliography ==
- Without Let Up (1973) Autobiography
