= Ed Sanneman =

Australian rules footballer

Personal information
- Full name: Edward Alexander Sanneman
- Born: 22 June 1902; Bendigo, Victoria
- Died: 17 March 1989 (aged 86)
- Original team: South Bendigo
- Height: 185 cm (6 ft 1 in)
- Weight: 82 kg (181 lb)
- Position: Half back

Playing career^{1}
Years	Club	Games (Goals)
1922, 1925–1931	St Kilda	72 (25)
- ^{1} Playing statistics correct to the end of 1931.

Edward Alexander Sanneman (22 June 1902 – 17 March 1989) was an Australian rules footballer who played with St Kilda in the Victorian Football League (VFL).
