= Ivan Sharp =

Australian rules footballer, born 1909

Personal information
- Full name: Ivan James Sharp
- Born: 31 August 1909; Ivanhoe, Victoria
- Died: 24 March 1989 (aged 79); Heidelberg, Victoria
- Original team: Ivanhoe
- Height: 174 cm (5 ft 9 in)

Playing career^{1}
Years	Club	Games (Goals)
1929–30	Fitzroy	18 (13)
- ^{1} Playing statistics correct to the end of 1930.

Ivan James Sharp (31 August 1909 – 24 March 1989) was an Australian rules footballer who played with Fitzroy in the Victorian Football League (VFL).

Sharp later served in the Australian Army during World War II.
