= Auditory-verbal therapy =

- Specialty: Ent/audiologist

Auditory-verbal therapy is a method for teaching deaf children to listen and speak using hearing technology such as hearing aids and auditory implants (such as cochlear implants and assistive listening devices). Auditory-verbal therapy emphasizes listening, and seeks to promote the development of the auditory brain to facilitate learning to communicate through talking. It is based on the child's use of optimally fitted hearing technology.

== Research ==
First Voice, a membership body which represents organisations that provide listening and spoken language programmes in Australia, New Zealand and across the globe, published a study in February 2015 based on information from more than 600 children with hearing loss. When listening and spoken language outcomes of children with hearing loss, including those with additional difficulties, were compared to those with typical hearing, most children attending AV programmes had scores within or above the average range for typical hearing children for language (75%), vocabulary (80%) and speech performance (70%). (First Voice, 2015 pp 5). Data from over 1,400 children and their families supported by First Voice organisations in 2018 across Australia, New Zealand and the UK shows that 86% of the early intervention AV graduates who had hearing loss only are within or above the range for age-matched, typically developing children without hearing loss.

In 2016, Kaiper and Danser published a systematic review looking at the efficacy of the Auditory Verbal (AV) approach. They found that: (i) AV approach can help children with hearing impairment, even beyond three years of age, to develop age appropriate language skills and catch up; (ii) children could recognize words accurately even in the presence of background noise; and, (iii) children who benefitted from receiving AV intervention could be successfully integrated within mainstream schooling.

Hogan et al. (2008; 2010; 2018) published outcomes for children in an AV programme which were essentially quasi-experimental studies: the assessment tool used had been standardised on typically developing children and so a comparison could be drawn between the age equivalence scores obtained by the children on the study and their chronological age. In these studies, the average rate of language development showed a statistically significant increase for the time on the programme compared to the average rate of language development prior to the programme.

== UK ==
In the UK, access to Auditory Verbal therapy is available in a limited number of NHS Cochlear Implant Programmes. Outside of the NHS, certified AV therapy is available via Auditory Verbal UK.

== See also ==
- Alexander Graham Bell Association for the Deaf and Hard of Hearing
